= Alessio Palumbo =

Italian motorcycle racer (born 1985)

- Nationality: Italian
- Born: 8 September 1985 (age 41); Catania, Italy
Motorcycle racing career statistics
250cc World Championship
Active years	2006
Manufacturers	Aprilia
Starts / Wins / Podiums / Poles / F. laps / Points; 11 / 0 / 0 / 0 / 0 / 0
Supersport World Championship
Active years	2010
Manufacturers	Kawasaki
Starts / Wins / Podiums / Poles / F. laps / Points; 4 / 0 / 0 / 0 / 0 / 8

Antonino Alessio Palumbo (born 8 September 1985) is an Italian motorcycle racer. He has competed at international level in the 250cc World Championship and the Supersport World Championship; at national level, he won the Coppa Italia 125 SP in 2004 and the Coppa Italia Stock 600 in 2008.

== Career statistics ==
=== CIV Championship (Campionato Italiano Velocita) ===
==== Races by year ====
(key) (Races in bold indicate pole position; races in italics indicate fastest lap)

Year	Class	Bike	1	2	3	4	5	6	Pos	Pts
2005	125cc	Aprilia	VAL; 7	MON; 4	IMO; 5	MIS1; Ret	MUG; 5	MIS2; 5	4th	55

=== Grand Prix motorcycle racing ===
==== By season ====
Season	Class	Motorcycle	Team	Race	Win	Podium	Pole	FLap	Pts	Plcd
2006	250cc	Aprilia	Matteoni Racing	11	0	0	0	0	0	NC
Total				**11**	**0**	**0**	**0**	**0**	**0**	

==== Races by year ====
(key)

Year	Class	Bike	1	2	3	4	5	6	7	8	9	10	11	12	13	14	15	16	Pos.	Pts
2006	250cc	Aprilia	SPA; Ret	QAT; 20	TUR; Ret	CHN; Ret	FRA; 23	ITA; 18	CAT; 18	NED; DNQ	GBR	GER; WD	CZE; DNQ	MAL; 18	AUS; DNQ	JPN; 24	POR; 22	VAL; Ret	NC	0

=== Supersport World Championship ===
==== Races by year ====
(key)

Year	Bike	1	2	3	4	5	6	7	8	9	10	11	12	13	Pos.	Pts
2010	Kawasaki	AUS	POR	SPA; Ret	NED	ITA	RSA	USA	SMR; 13	CZE; 14	GBR	GER	ITA; 13	FRA	23rd	8
