= Portimão Superbike World Championship round =

Portimão Superbike World Championship round may refer to:

- 2008 Portimão Superbike World Championship round
- 2009 Portimão Superbike World Championship round
- 2010 Portimão Superbike World Championship round
- 2011 Portimão Superbike World Championship round

== See also ==
- Algarve International Circuit
