= 2010 Brno Superbike World Championship round =

(Czech Republic) 2010 Brno Superbike World Championship round
Round details
- Round 9 of 13 rounds in the 2010 Superbike World Championship. and Round 9 of 13 rounds in the 2010 Supersport World Championship.
- Date: July 11, 2010
- Location: Masaryk Circuit
- Course: Permanent racing facility 5.403 km (3.357 mi)

Superbike World Championship
Pole position
(United Kingdom) Cal Crutchlow
1:58.018
| Fastest lap race 1 | Fastest lap race 2 |
| (United Kingdom) Cal Crutchlow | (United Kingdom) Cal Crutchlow |
| 1:59.964 | 1:59.291 |

Supersport World Championship
Pole position
(Spain) Joan Lascorz
2:02.800
Fastest lap
(Spain) Joan Lascorz
2:03.998

The 2010 Brno Superbike World Championship round was the ninth round of the 2010 Superbike World Championship season. It took place on the weekend of 9–11 July 2010 at the Masaryk Circuit located in Brno. Qualifying was held on 10 July and was won by British rider Cal Crutchlow. The three-day event was attended by 64,000 spectators.

== Results ==
=== Superbike race 1 classification ===
| Pos | No | Rider | Bike | Laps | Time | Grid | Pts |
|---|---|---|---|---|---|---|---|
| 1 | 65 | (United Kingdom) Jonathan Rea | Honda CBR1000RR | 20 | 40:16.037 | 3 | 25 |
| 2 | 3 | (Italy) Max Biaggi | Aprilia RSV4 1000 F | 20 | +2.518 | 2 | 20 |
| 3 | 35 | (United Kingdom) Cal Crutchlow | Yamaha YZF R1 | 20 | +4.071 | 1 | 16 |
| 4 | 50 | (France) Sylvain Guintoli | Suzuki GSX-R1000 | 20 | +7.160 | 5 | 13 |
| 5 | 111 | (Spain) Rubén Xaus | BMW S1000RR | 20 | +8.602 | 4 | 11 |
| 6 | 41 | (Japan) Noriyuki Haga | Ducati 1098R | 20 | +11.379 | 15 | 10 |
| 7 | 52 | (United Kingdom) James Toseland | Yamaha YZF R1 | 20 | +11.513 | 10 | 9 |
| 8 | 91 | (United Kingdom) Leon Haslam | Suzuki GSX-R1000 | 20 | +16.487 | 14 | 8 |
| 9 | 7 | (Spain) Carlos Checa | Ducati 1098R | 20 | +20.829 | 8 | 7 |
| 10 | 57 | (Italy) Lorenzo Lanzi | Ducati 1098R | 20 | +25.164 | 9 | 6 |
| 11 | 66 | (United Kingdom) Tom Sykes | Kawasaki ZX 10R | 20 | +32.602 | 12 | 5 |
| 12 | 67 | (United Kingdom) Shane Byrne | Ducati 1098R | 20 | +36.748 | 16 | 4 |
| 13 | 23 | (Australia) Broc Parkes | Honda CBR1000RR | 20 | +39.183 | 21 | 3 |
| 14 | 95 | (United States) Roger Lee Hayden | Kawasaki ZX 10R | 20 | +59.889 | 22 | 2 |
| 15 | 15 | (Italy) Matteo Baiocco | Kawasaki ZX 10R | 20 | +1:05.329 | 19 | 1 |
| Ret | 84 | (Italy) Michel Fabrizio | Ducati 1098R | 12 | Retirement | 7 | |
| Ret | 99 | (Italy) Luca Scassa | Ducati 1098R | 4 | Accident | 6 | |
| Ret | 2 | (United Kingdom) Leon Camier | Aprilia RSV4 1000 F | 4 | Retirement | 13 | |
| Ret | 77 | (Australia) Chris Vermeulen | Kawasaki ZX 10R | 0 | Accident | 18 | |
| Ret | 96 | (Czech Republic) Jakub Smrz | Aprilia RSV4 1000 F | 0 | Accident | 17 | |
| Ret | 76 | (Germany) Max Neukirchner | Honda CBR1000RR | 0 | Accident | 11 | |
| DNS | 11 | (Australia) Troy Corser | BMW S1000RR | | Injured | 20 | |

=== Superbike race 2 classification ===
| Pos | No | Rider | Bike | Laps | Time | Grid | Pts |
|---|---|---|---|---|---|---|---|
| 1 | 3 | (Italy) Max Biaggi | Aprilia RSV4 1000 F | 20 | 40:12.236 | 2 | 25 |
| 2 | 65 | (United Kingdom) Jonathan Rea | Honda CBR1000RR | 20 | +4.627 | 3 | 20 |
| 3 | 84 | (Italy) Michel Fabrizio | Ducati 1098R | 20 | +13.600 | 7 | 16 |
| 4 | 52 | (United Kingdom) James Toseland | Yamaha YZF R1 | 20 | +16.372 | 10 | 13 |
| 5 | 41 | (Japan) Noriyuki Haga | Ducati 1098R | 20 | +17.530 | 15 | 11 |
| 6 | 7 | (Spain) Carlos Checa | Ducati 1098R | 20 | +21.704 | 8 | 10 |
| 7 | 50 | (France) Sylvain Guintoli | Suzuki GSX-R1000 | 20 | +23.769 | 5 | 9 |
| 8 | 2 | (United Kingdom) Leon Camier | Aprilia RSV4 1000 F | 20 | +25.875 | 13 | 8 |
| 9 | 67 | (United Kingdom) Shane Byrne | Ducati 1098R | 20 | +30.374 | 16 | 7 |
| 10 | 91 | (United Kingdom) Leon Haslam | Suzuki GSX-R1000 | 20 | +34.002 | 14 | 6 |
| 11 | 57 | (Italy) Lorenzo Lanzi | Ducati 1098R | 20 | +34.691 | 9 | 5 |
| 12 | 23 | (Australia) Broc Parkes | Honda CBR1000RR | 20 | +49.270 | 21 | 4 |
| 13 | 95 | (United States) Roger Lee Hayden | Kawasaki ZX 10R | 20 | +1:03.258 | 22 | 3 |
| 14 | 35 | (United Kingdom) Cal Crutchlow | Yamaha YZF R1 | 19 | +1 Lap | 1 | 2 |
| 15 | 15 | (Italy) Matteo Baiocco | Kawasaki ZX 10R | 19 | +1 Lap | 19 | 1 |
| Ret | 96 | (Czech Republic) Jakub Smrz | Aprilia RSV4 F | 15 | Accident | 17 | |
| Ret | 111 | (Spain) Ruben Xaus | BMW S1000RR | 14 | Accident | 4 | |
| Ret | 77 | (Australia) Chris Vermeulen | Kawasaki ZX 10R | 2 | Retirement | 18 | |
| Ret | 66 | (United Kingdom) Tom Sykes | Kawasaki ZX 10R | 0 | Accident | 12 | |
| Ret | 76 | (Germany) Max Neukirchner | Honda CBR1000RR | 0 | Accident | 11 | |
| DNS | 99 | (Italy) Luca Scassa | Ducati 1098R | | Injured in race 1 | 6 | |
| DNS | 11 | (Australia) Troy Corser | BMW S1000RR | | Injured | 20 | |

=== Supersport race classification ===
| Pos | No | Rider | Bike | Laps | Time | Grid | Pts |
|---|---|---|---|---|---|---|---|
| 1 | 54 | (Turkey) Kenan Sofuoglu | Honda CBR600RR | 18 | 37:25.108 | 5 | 25 |
| 2 | 26 | (Spain) Joan Lascorz | Kawasaki ZX-6R | 18 | +0.124 | 1 | 20 |
| 3 | 7 | (United Kingdom) Chaz Davies | Triumph Daytona 675 | 18 | +7.153 | 8 | 16 |
| 4 | 4 | (United Kingdom) Gino Rea | Honda CBR600RR | 18 | +7.813 | 7 | 13 |
| 5 | 37 | (Japan) Katsuaki Fujiwara | Kawasaki ZX-6R | 18 | +14.268 | 2 | 11 |
| 6 | 127 | (Denmark) Robbin Harms | Honda CBR600RR | 18 | +24.832 | 9 | 10 |
| 7 | 117 | (Portugal) Miguel Praia | Honda CBR600RR | 18 | +30.907 | 10 | 9 |
| 8 | 25 | (Spain) David Salom | Triumph Daytona 675 | 18 | +30.985 | 11 | 8 |
| 9 | 14 | (France) Matthieu Lagrive | Triumph Daytona 675 | 18 | +32.463 | 12 | 7 |
| 10 | 99 | (France) Fabien Foret | Kawasaki ZX-6R | 18 | +38.232 | 4 | 6 |
| 11 | 31 | (Italy) Vittorio Iannuzzo | Triumph Daytona 675 | 18 | +40.343 | 13 | 5 |
| 12 | 55 | (Italy) Massimo Roccoli | Honda CBR600RR | 18 | +40.762 | 14 | 4 |
| 13 | 22 | (Poland) Daniel Bukowski | Honda CBR600RR | 18 | +58.901 | 20 | 3 |
| 14 | 85 | (Italy) Alessio Palumbo | Kawasaki ZX-6R | 18 | +1:02.708 | 17 | 2 |
| 15 | 32 | (Czech Republic) Tomas Holubec | Honda CBR600RR | 18 | +1:05.089 | 19 | 1 |
| 16 | 88 | (Slovakia) Jaroslav Cerny | Yamaha YZF R6 | 18 | +1:19.704 | 21 | |
| 17 | 74 | (Slovenia) Bostjan Skubic | Yamaha YZF R6 | 18 | +1:36.598 | 22 | |
| 18 | 24 | (Russia) Eduard Blokhin | Yamaha YZF R6 | 18 | +1:54.374 | 23 | |
| 19 | 10 | (Hungary) Imre Toth | Honda CBR600RR | 17 | +1 Lap | 24 | |
| Ret | 8 | (Switzerland) Bastien Chesaux | Honda CBR600RR | 17 | Accident | 16 | |
| Ret | 9 | (Italy) Danilo Dell'Omo | Honda CBR600RR | 16 | Retirement | 18 | |
| Ret | 50 | (Republic of Ireland) Eugene Laverty | Honda CBR600RR | 5 | Retirement | 3 | |
| Ret | 51 | (Italy) Michele Pirro | Honda CBR600RR | 2 | Accident | 6 | |
| Ret | 5 | (Sweden) Alexander Lundh | Honda CBR600RR | 0 | Accident | 15 | |

=== Superstock 1000 race classification ===
| Pos | No | Rider | Manufacturer | Laps | Time | Grid | Points |
|---|---|---|---|---|---|---|---|
| 1 | 86 | (Italy) Ayrton Badovini | BMW S1000RR | 12 | 25:02.800 | 1 | 25 |
| 2 | 87 | (Italy) Lorenzo Zanetti | Ducati 1098R | 12 | +0.286 | 4 | 20 |
| 3 | 8 | (Italy) Andrea Antonelli | Honda CBR1000RR | 12 | +4.060 | 6 | 16 |
| 4 | 29 | (Italy) Daniele Beretta | BMW S1000RR | 12 | +6.201 | 18 | 13 |
| 5 | 14 | (Italy) Lorenzo Baroni | Ducati 1098R | 12 | +7.926 | 8 | 11 |
| 6 | 119 | (Italy) Michele Magnoni | Honda CBR1000RR | 12 | +8.391 | 5 | 10 |
| 7 | 7 | (Austria) René Mähr | Suzuki GSX-R1000 K9 | 12 | +12.551 | 11 | 9 |
| 8 | 16 | (Czech Republic) Michal Šembera | BMW S1000RR | 12 | +17.653 | 14 | 8 |
| 9 | 65 | (France) Loris Baz | Yamaha YZF-R1 | 12 | +20.919 | 16 | 7 |
| 10 | 30 | (Switzerland) Michaël Savary | BMW S1000RR | 12 | +27.915 | 19 | 6 |
| 11 | 69 | (Czech Republic) Ondřej Ježek | Aprilia RSV4 1000 | 12 | +36.078 | 22 | 5 |
| 12 | 12 | (Italy) Nico Vivarelli | KTM 1190 RC8 R | 12 | +36.154 | 23 | 4 |
| 13 | 55 | (Slovakia) Tomáš Svitok | Honda CBR1000RR | 12 | +36.261 | 24 | 3 |
| 14 | 99 | (South Africa) Chris Leeson | Kawasaki ZX-10R | 12 | +40.077 | 21 | 2 |
| 15 | 36 | (Brazil) Philippe Thiriet | Honda CBR1000RR | 12 | +54.271 | 26 | 1 |
| 16 | 64 | (Brazil) Danilo Andric | Honda CBR1000RR | 12 | +57.048 | 27 | |
| Ret | 34 | (Italy) Davide Giugliano | Suzuki GSX-R1000 K9 | 8 | Retirement | 15 | |
| Ret | 20 | (France) Sylvain Barrier | BMW S1000RR | 8 | Retirement | 3 | |
| Ret | 47 | (Italy) Eddi La Marra | Honda CBR1000RR | 5 | Accident | 7 | |
| Ret | 11 | (Spain) Pere Tutusaus | KTM 1190 RC8 R | 4 | Technical | 17 | |
| Ret | 66 | (Poland) Mateusz Stoklosa | BMW S1000RR | 4 | Retirement | 25 | |
| Ret | 93 | (France) Mathieu Lussiana | BMW S1000RR | 2 | Accident | 12 | |
| Ret | 53 | (Germany) Dominic Lammert | BMW S1000RR | 2 | Accident | 9 | |
| Ret | 9 | (Italy) Danilo Petrucci | Kawasaki ZX-10R | 2 | Accident | 13 | |
| Ret | 21 | (France) Maxime Berger | Honda CBR1000RR | 1 | Retirement | 2 | |
| Ret | 89 | (Czech Republic) Michal Salač | Aprilia RSV4 1000 | 0 | Retirement | 28 | |
| Ret | 91 | (Poland) Marcin Walkowiak | Honda CBR1000RR | 0 | Accident | 20 | |
| Ret | 5 | (Italy) Marco Bussolotti | Honda CBR1000RR | 0 | Retirement | 10 | |
| DNS | 45 | (Norway) Kim Arne Sletten | Yamaha YZF-R1 | 0 | Did not start | 29 | |

=== Superstock 600 race classification ===
| Pos | No | Rider | Manufacturer | Laps | Time | Grid | Points |
|---|---|---|---|---|---|---|---|
| 1 | 11 | (France) Jérémy Guarnoni | Yamaha YZF-R6 | 7 | 14:59.203 | 4 | 25 |
| 2 | 21 | (France) Florian Marino | Honda CBR600RR | 7 | +1.189 | 3 | 20 |
| 3 | 13 | (Italy) Dino Lombardi | Yamaha YZF-R6 | 7 | +2.444 | 5 | 16 |
| 4 | 27 | (Italy) Davide Fanelli | Honda CBR600RR | 7 | +5.051 | 8 | 13 |
| 5 | 28 | (France) Steven Le Coquen | Yamaha YZF-R6 | 7 | +6.883 | 6 | 11 |
| 6 | 59 | (Denmark) Alex Schacht | Honda CBR600RR | 7 | +7.747 | 7 | 10 |
| 7 | 343 | (Italy) Federico D'Annunzio | Yamaha YZF-R6 | 7 | +13.899 | 13 | 9 |
| 8 | 19 | (Slovakia) Tomáš Krajči | Yamaha YZF-R6 | 7 | +13.994 | 11 | 8 |
| 9 | 55 | (Belgium) Vincent Lonbois | Yamaha YZF-R6 | 7 | +15.454 | 15 | 7 |
| 10 | 66 | (France) Richard De Tournay | Yamaha YZF-R6 | 7 | +15.808 | 17 | 6 |
| 11 | 99 | (Netherlands) Tony Coveña | Yamaha YZF-R6 | 7 | +16.556 | 16 | 5 |
| 12 | 44 | (Italy) Michael Mazzina | Triumph Daytona 675 | 7 | +19.484 | 14 | 4 |
| 13 | 47 | (Poland) Mateusz Korobacz | Yamaha YZF-R6 | 7 | +34.368 | 19 | 3 |
| NC | 9 | (United Kingdom) Joshua Elliott | Kawasaki ZX-6R | 7 | (+2.081) | 1 | |
| Ret | 69 | (France) Nelson Major | Yamaha YZF-R6 | 6 | Accident | 10 | |
| Ret | 72 | (Norway) Fredrik Karlsen | Yamaha YZF-R6 | 6 | Accident | 12 | |
| Ret | 10 | (Spain) Nacho Calero | Yamaha YZF-R6 | 2 | Accident | 2 | |
| Ret | 26 | (Romania) Mircea Vrajitoru | Yamaha YZF-R6 | 2 | Accident | 18 | |
| Ret | 6 | (France) Romain Lanusse | Yamaha YZF-R6 | 0 | Accident | 9 | |
| DNS | 82 | (Czech Republic) Karel Pešek | Yamaha YZF-R6 | | Did not start | | |
