= 2010 Supersport World Championship =

Motorcycle competition

2010 Supersport World Championship
Previous:	2009	Next:	2011
Support series: Superbike World Championship; FIM Superstock 1000 Cup; European Superstock 600 Championship

The 2010 Supersport World Championship was the twelfth FIM Supersport World Championship season—the fourteenth taking into account the two held under the name of Supersport World Series. The season started on 28 February at Phillip Island and finished on 3 October at Magny-Cours after thirteen rounds. The championship supported the Superbike World Championship at every round.

Kenan Sofuoğlu clinched the title at the final round after a season-long battle with Eugene Laverty. Joan Lascorz was also in contention for most of the season but suffered a season-ending injury at Silverstone, however he amassed enough points to claim third place.

== Race calendar and results ==
The provisional race schedule was publicly announced by FIM on 6 October 2009 with the most notable change from the 2009 Superbike World Championship season being the dropping of the round at Losail, Qatar. For the first time in series history, a race was run on a day other than Sunday, with the race at Miller Motorsports Park being held on Monday 31 May. These races ran as part of the Memorial Day weekend in the United States. The FIM altered the calendar on 22 January 2010 with Silverstone replacing Donington Park as the host of the British round.

Round	Country	Circuit	Date	Pole position	Fastest lap	Winning rider	Winning team	Report
1	Australia	Phillip Island Grand Prix Circuit	28 February	(Spain) Joan Lascorz	(Republic of Ireland) Eugene Laverty	(Republic of Ireland) Eugene Laverty	Parkalgar Honda	Report
2	Portugal	Autódromo Internacional do Algarve	28 March	(Republic of Ireland) Eugene Laverty	(Italy) Michele Pirro	(Turkey) Kenan Sofuoğlu	Ten Kate Honda	Report
3	Spain	Circuit Ricardo Tormo	11 April	(Republic of Ireland) Eugene Laverty	(Spain) Joan Lascorz	(Spain) Joan Lascorz	Motocard.com Kawasaki	Report
4	Netherlands	TT Circuit Assen	25 April	(Turkey) Kenan Sofuoğlu	(Turkey) Kenan Sofuoğlu	(Republic of Ireland) Eugene Laverty	Parkalgar Honda	Report
5	Italy	Autodromo Nazionale Monza	9 May	(Turkey) Kenan Sofuoğlu	(Republic of Ireland) Eugene Laverty	(Republic of Ireland) Eugene Laverty	Parkalgar Honda	Report
6	South Africa	Kyalami	16 May	(Republic of Ireland) Eugene Laverty	(Turkey) Kenan Sofuoğlu	(Republic of Ireland) Eugene Laverty	Parkalgar Honda	Report
7	United States	Miller Motorsports Park	31 May	(Turkey) Kenan Sofuoğlu	(Turkey) Kenan Sofuoğlu	(Turkey) Kenan Sofuoğlu	Ten Kate Honda	Report
8	San Marino	Misano World Circuit	27 June	(Italy) Michele Pirro	(Turkey) Kenan Sofuoğlu	(Republic of Ireland) Eugene Laverty	Parkalgar Honda	Report
9	Czech Republic	Masaryk Circuit	11 July	(Spain) Joan Lascorz	(Spain) Joan Lascorz	(Turkey) Kenan Sofuoğlu	Ten Kate Honda	Report
10	(United Kingdom) Great Britain	Silverstone Circuit	1 August	(Republic of Ireland) Eugene Laverty	(Turkey) Kenan Sofuoğlu	(Republic of Ireland) Eugene Laverty	Parkalgar Honda	Report
11	Germany	Nürburgring	5 September	(Republic of Ireland) Eugene Laverty	(Republic of Ireland) Eugene Laverty	(Republic of Ireland) Eugene Laverty	Parkalgar Honda	Report
12	Italy	Autodromo Enzo e Dino Ferrari	26 September	(Turkey) Kenan Sofuoğlu	(Republic of Ireland) Eugene Laverty	(Italy) Michele Pirro	Ten Kate Honda	Report
13	France	Circuit de Nevers Magny-Cours	3 October	(Turkey) Kenan Sofuoğlu	(Republic of Ireland) Eugene Laverty	(Republic of Ireland) Eugene Laverty	Parkalgar Honda	Report

== Championship standings ==
=== Riders' standings ===
Pos.	Rider	Bike	AUS (Australia)	POR (Portugal)	SPA (Spain)	NED (Netherlands)	ITA (Italy)	RSA (South Africa)	USA (United States)	SMR (San Marino)	CZE (Czech Republic)	GBR (United Kingdom)	GER (Germany)	ITA (Italy)	FRA (France)	Pts
1	(Turkey) Kenan Sofuoğlu	Honda	3	1	2	**3**	**2**	2	**1**	3	1	2	2	**2**	**2**	263
2	(Republic of Ireland) Eugene Laverty	Honda	1	**11**	**5**	1	1	**1**	2	1	Ret	**1**	**1**	3	1	252
3	(Spain) Joan Lascorz	Kawasaki	**2**	2	1	2	3	5	3	2	**2**	DNS				168
4	(United Kingdom) Chaz Davies	Triumph	12	4	3	4	7	3	4	4	3	4	5	Ret	3	153
5	(Italy) Michele Pirro	Honda	Ret	3	11	Ret	4	4	5	**Ret**	Ret		8	1	8	99
6	(Spain) David Salom	Triumph	4	10	4	Ret	8	7	7	10	8	8	6	Ret	7	99
7	(Denmark) Robbin Harms	Honda	7	7	9	6	Ret	8	8	6	6	5	11	Ret	5	98
8	(Italy) Massimo Roccoli	Honda	6	9	Ret	9	11	Ret	13	7	12	9	7	6	4	84
9	(United Kingdom) Gino Rea	Honda	10	8	6	7	9	9	9	Ret	4	3	DSQ	Ret	Ret	83
10	(Japan) Katsuaki Fujiwara	Kawasaki	11	6	Ret	8	5	12	6		5	15	Ret	5	6	81
11	(France) Matthieu Lagrive	Triumph		Ret	7	5	6	6	12	11	9	7	Ret	11		70
12	(Portugal) Miguel Praia	Honda	9	Ret	12	10	10	10	14	9	7	6	13	Ret	10	66
13	(France) Fabien Foret	Kawasaki	5	5	10	Ret	Ret	Ret	10	8	10	12	4	Ret	Ret	65
14	(Italy) Roberto Tamburini	Yamaha								5		DNS	9	9	9	32
15	(Australia) Broc Parkes	Kawasaki											3	4	Ret	29
16	(Sweden) Alexander Lundh	Honda	Ret	13	8	11	13	13	15	Ret	Ret			15	Ret	24
17	(United States) Jason DiSalvo	Triumph	8	12	Ret	12	Ret	Ret	11							21
18	(Italy) Vittorio Iannuzzo	Triumph								12	11	14	Ret	12	Ret	15
19	(Italy) Danilo Dell'Omo	Honda	15	15	Ret	13	Ret	Ret		14	Ret	19	10			13
20	(Italy) Gianluca Vizziello	Honda					12							10		10
21	(Australia) Mark Aitchison	Honda										22	Ret	7	Ret	9
22	(Italy) Cristiano Migliorati	Kawasaki												8		8
23	(Italy) Alessio Palumbo	Kawasaki			Ret					13	14			13		8
24	(Switzerland) Bastien Chesaux	Honda		14	Ret	14	15	14	17	15	Ret	16	Ret	DNS		8
25	(United Kingdom) Sam Lowes	Honda										10				6
26	(France) Axel Maurin	Yamaha													11	5
27	(United Kingdom) James Westmoreland	Yamaha										11				5
28	(South Africa) Lance Isaacs	Honda						11								5
29	(France) Florian Marino	Honda													12	4
30	(United Kingdom) Christian Iddon	Honda										17	12			4
31	(Australia) Billy McConnell	Yamaha										13				3
32	(Poland) Daniel Bukowski	Honda									13					3
33	(France) Sébastien Charpentier	Triumph	13													3
34	(Italy) Andrea Boscoscuro	Honda					14	15								3
35	(Italy) Paola Cazzola	Honda	14	16	Ret	15				18						3
36	(Italy) Giuseppe Barone	Honda												14		2
37	(Hungary) Imre Tóth	Honda				16	16			19	19	23	14	Ret	Ret	2
38	(Czech Republic) Tomáš Holubec	Honda									15					1
	(United States) Tyler Odom	Honda							16							0
	(Italy) Iuri Vigilucci	Yamaha								16						0
	(Slovakia) Jaroslav Černý	Yamaha									16					0
	(United Kingdom) Max Hunt	Yamaha		17								21				0
	(Italy) Fabio Menghi	Yamaha								17						0
	(Slovenia) Boštjan Skubic	Yamaha									17					0
	(Russia) Eduard Blokhin	Yamaha		18	DNQ					Ret	18			DNQ		0
	(South Africa) Ronan Quarmby	Honda						DNS				18	Ret	Ret		0
	(United States) Jason Farrell	Kawasaki							18							0
	(United Kingdom) Ian Lowry	Yamaha										20				0
	(South Africa) Jacques Peskens	Honda						Ret								0
	(United States) Melissa Paris	Yamaha							Ret							0
	(Italy) Alessandro Torcolacci	Triumph								Ret						0
	(United Kingdom) Alex Lowes	Yamaha										Ret				0
	(United Kingdom) Jenny Tinmouth	Honda										Ret				0
	(France) Julien Enjolras	Triumph													Ret	0
	(Hungary) Nikolett Kovács	Honda								DNQ						0
	(Italy) Mauro Goffi	Honda												DNQ		0
Pos.	Rider	Bike	AUS (Australia)	POR (Portugal)	SPA (Spain)	NED (Netherlands)	ITA (Italy)	RSA (South Africa)	USA (United States)	SMR (San Marino)	CZE (Czech Republic)	GBR (United Kingdom)	GER (Germany)	ITA (Italy)	FRA (France)	Pts

Colour	Result
Gold	Winner
Silver	Second place
Bronze	Third place
Green	Points classification
Blue	Non-points classification
Blue	Non-classified finish (NC)
Purple	Retired, not classified (Ret)
Red	Did not qualify (DNQ)
Red	Did not pre-qualify (DNPQ)
Black	Disqualified (DSQ)
White	Did not start (DNS)
White	Withdrew (WD)
White	Race cancelled (C)
Blank	Did not practice (DNP)
Blank	Did not arrive (DNA)
Blank	Excluded (EX)

Bold – Pole position
Italics – Fastest lap

=== Manufacturers' standings ===
Pos.	Manufacturer	AUS (Australia)	POR (Portugal)	SPA (Spain)	NED (Netherlands)	ITA (Italy)	RSA (South Africa)	USA (United States)	SMR (San Marino)	CZE (Czech Republic)	GBR (United Kingdom)	GER (Germany)	ITA (Italy)	FRA (France)	Pts
1	(Japan) Honda	1	1	2	1	1	1	1	1	1	1	1	1	1	320
2	(Japan) Kawasaki	2	2	1	2	3	5	3	2	2	12	3	4	6	211
3	(United Kingdom) Triumph	4	4	3	4	6	3	4	4	3	4	5	11	3	168
4	(Japan) Yamaha		17	DNQ				Ret	5	16	11	9	9	9	37
Pos.	Manufacturer	AUS (Australia)	POR (Portugal)	SPA (Spain)	NED (Netherlands)	ITA (Italy)	RSA (South Africa)	USA (United States)	SMR (San Marino)	CZE (Czech Republic)	GBR (United Kingdom)	GER (Germany)	ITA (Italy)	FRA (France)	Pts

== Entry list ==
2010 entry list
Team	Constructor	Motorcycle	No.	Rider	Rounds
Came Yamaha	Yamaha	Yamaha YZF-R6	3	(United Kingdom) James Westmoreland	10
Came Yamaha	Yamaha	Yamaha YZF-R6	17	(Australia) Billy McConnell	10
Intermoto Czech	Honda	Honda CBR600RR	4	(United Kingdom) Gino Rea	All
Intermoto Czech	Honda	Honda CBR600RR	32	(Czech Republic) Tomáš Holubec	9
Intermoto Czech	Honda	Honda CBR600RR	55	(Italy) Massimo Roccoli	All
Cresto Guide Racing Team	Honda	Honda CBR600RR	5	(Sweden) Alexander Lundh	1–10, 12–13
Cresto Guide Racing Team	Honda	Honda CBR600RR	21	(United Kingdom) Christian Iddon	11
Team ParkinGO Triumph BE1 Racing	Triumph	Triumph Daytona 675	7	(United Kingdom) Chaz Davies	All
Team ParkinGO Triumph BE1 Racing	Triumph	Triumph Daytona 675	14	(France) Matthieu Lagrive	2–12
Team ParkinGO Triumph BE1 Racing	Triumph	Triumph Daytona 675	16	(France) Sébastien Charpentier	1
Team ParkinGO Triumph BE1 Racing	Triumph	Triumph Daytona 675	25	(Spain) David Salom	All
Team ParkinGO Triumph BE1 Racing	Triumph	Triumph Daytona 675	31	(Italy) Vittorio Iannuzzo	8–13
Team ParkinGO Triumph BE1 Racing	Triumph	Triumph Daytona 675	40	(United States) Jason DiSalvo	1–7
Team ParkinGO Triumph BE1 Racing	Triumph	Triumph Daytona 675	69	(France) Julien Enjolras	13
Harms Benjan Racing	Honda	Honda CBR600RR	8	(Switzerland) Bastien Chesaux	2–12
Harms Benjan Racing	Honda	Honda CBR600RR	127	(Denmark) Robbin Harms	All
Kuja Racing	Honda	Honda CBR600RR	9	(Italy) Danilo Dell'Omo	1–6, 8–11
Kuja Racing	Honda	Honda CBR600RR	15	(Hungary) Nikolett Kovács	8
Kuja Racing	Honda	Honda CBR600RR	18	(Australia) Mark Aitchison	10–13
Kuja Racing	Honda	Honda CBR600RR	19	(Italy) Andrea Boscoscuro	5–6
Kuja Racing	Honda	Honda CBR600RR	33	(Italy) Paola Cazzola	1–4
Kuja Racing	Honda	Honda CBR600RR	107	(Italy) Mauro Goffi	12
Team Tóth	Honda	Honda CBR600RR	10	(Hungary) Imre Tóth	4–5, 8–13
GNS Racing	Honda	Honda CBR600RR	11	(United Kingdom) Sam Lowes	10
IFS Lowe Racedays	Yamaha	Yamaha YZF-R6	12	(United Kingdom) Ian Lowry	10
MPH Racing	Yamaha	Yamaha YZF-R6	13	(United States) Melissa Paris	7
Parkalgar Honda	Honda	Honda CBR600RR	21	(United Kingdom) Christian Iddon	10
Parkalgar Honda	Honda	Honda CBR600RR	50	(Republic of Ireland) Eugene Laverty	All
Parkalgar Honda	Honda	Honda CBR600RR	117	(Portugal) Miguel Praia	All
Bogdanka Racing	Honda	Honda CBR600RR	22	(Poland) Daniel Bukowski	9
Kawasaki Motocard.com	Kawasaki	Kawasaki ZX-6R	23	(Australia) Broc Parkes	11–13
Kawasaki Motocard.com	Kawasaki	Kawasaki ZX-6R	26	(Spain) Joan Lascorz	1–10
Kawasaki Motocard.com	Kawasaki	Kawasaki ZX-6R	37	(Japan) Katsuaki Fujiwara	1–7, 9–13
Rivamoto	Yamaha	Yamaha YZF-R6	24	(Russia) Eduard Blokhin	2–3, 8–9, 12
Seton Interceptor	Yamaha	Yamaha YZF-R6	29	(United Kingdom) Alex Lowes	10
Wild Boar Team	Yamaha	Yamaha YZF-R6	33	(Italy) Paola Cazzola	8
Interfile Tyres in Transit Team	Honda	Honda CBR600RR	34	(South Africa) Ronan Quarmby	11–12
BikeFin SafeSky Honda	Honda	Honda CBR600RR	34	(South Africa) Ronan Quarmby	6
BikeFin SafeSky Honda	Honda	Honda CBR600RR	38	(South Africa) Lance Isaacs	6
BikeFin SafeSky Honda	Honda	Honda CBR600RR	43	(South Africa) Jacques Peskens	6
HANNspree Ten Kate Honda	Honda	Honda CBR600RR	34	(South Africa) Ronan Quarmby	10
HANNspree Ten Kate Honda	Honda	Honda CBR600RR	51	(Italy) Michele Pirro	1–9, 11–13
HANNspree Ten Kate Honda	Honda	Honda CBR600RR	54	(Turkey) Kenan Sofuoğlu	All
HANNspree Ten Kate Honda	Honda	Honda CBR600RR	121	(France) Florian Marino	13
Race Lab Yamaha	Yamaha	Yamaha YZF-R6	36	(United Kingdom) Max Hunt	2, 10
Bike Service Racing Team	Yamaha	Yamaha YZF-R6	44	(Italy) Roberto Tamburini	8, 10–13
Velmotor 2000	Honda	Honda CBR600RR	45	(Italy) Gianluca Vizziello	5, 12
Erion Racing	Honda	Honda CBR600RR	46	(United States) Tyler Odom	7
Puccetti Racing Kawasaki Italia	Kawasaki	Kawasaki ZX-6R	53	(Italy) Cristiano Migliorati	12
Puccetti Racing Kawasaki Italia	Kawasaki	Kawasaki ZX-6R	85	(Italy) Alessio Palumbo	3, 8–9, 12
VFT Racing	Yamaha	Yamaha YZF-R6	61	(Italy) Fabio Menghi	8
Inotherm Racing Team	Yamaha	Yamaha YZF-R6	74	(Slovenia) Boštjan Skubic	9
Team Civita Racing	Triumph	Triumph Daytona 675	77	(Italy) Alessandro Torcolacci	8
Vigi Racing	Yamaha	Yamaha YZF-R6	82	(Italy) Iuri Vigilucci	8
Indy Superbikes.com	Kawasaki	Kawasaki ZX-6R	86	(United States) Jason Farrell	7
Bily Racing Team	Yamaha	Yamaha YZF-R6	88	(Slovakia) Jaroslav Černý	9
Team Falcone Competition	Yamaha	Yamaha YZF-R6	89	(France) Axel Maurin	13
Team Lorenzini by Leoni	Kawasaki	Kawasaki ZX-6R	99	(France) Fabien Foret	All
Sorrymate.com Racing	Honda	Honda CBR600RR	110	(United Kingdom) Jenny Tinmouth	10
RCGM 2B Corse	Yamaha	Yamaha YZF-R6	131	(Italy) Giuseppe Barone	12

Key
Regular rider
Wildcard rider
Replacement rider

- All entries used Pirelli tyres.
