= Roger Lee Hayden =

American motorcycle racer

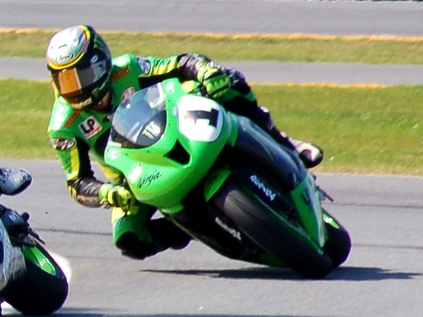
- Hayden at the 2008 Daytona 200
- Nationality: (United States) American
- Born: May 30, 1983 (age 43); Owensboro, Kentucky, U.S.
- Current team: Yoshimura Suzuki Factory Racing
- Bike number: 95
- Website: RogerHayden.com
Motorcycle racing career statistics
MotoGP World Championship
Active years	2007, 2010
Manufacturers	Kawasaki, Honda
2010 championship position	19th (5 pts)
Starts / Wins / Podiums / Poles / F. laps / Points; 2 / 0 / 0 / 0 / 0 / 11
Moto2 World Championship
Active years	2010
Manufacturers	Honda, Moriwaki
Championships	0
2010 championship position	NC (0 pts)
Starts / Wins / Podiums / Poles / F. laps / Points; 1 / 0 / 0 / 0 / 0 / 0
Superbike World Championship
Active years	2010
Manufacturers	Kawasaki
Championships	0
2010 championship position	19th (10 pts)
Starts / Wins / Podiums / Poles / F. laps / Points; 26 / 0 / 0 / 0 / 0 / 10

Roger Lee Hayden (born May 30, 1983) is an American professional motorcycle racer, the younger brother of both 2006 MotoGP World Champion Nicky Hayden and AMA Superbike Championship rider Tommy Hayden.

== Career ==
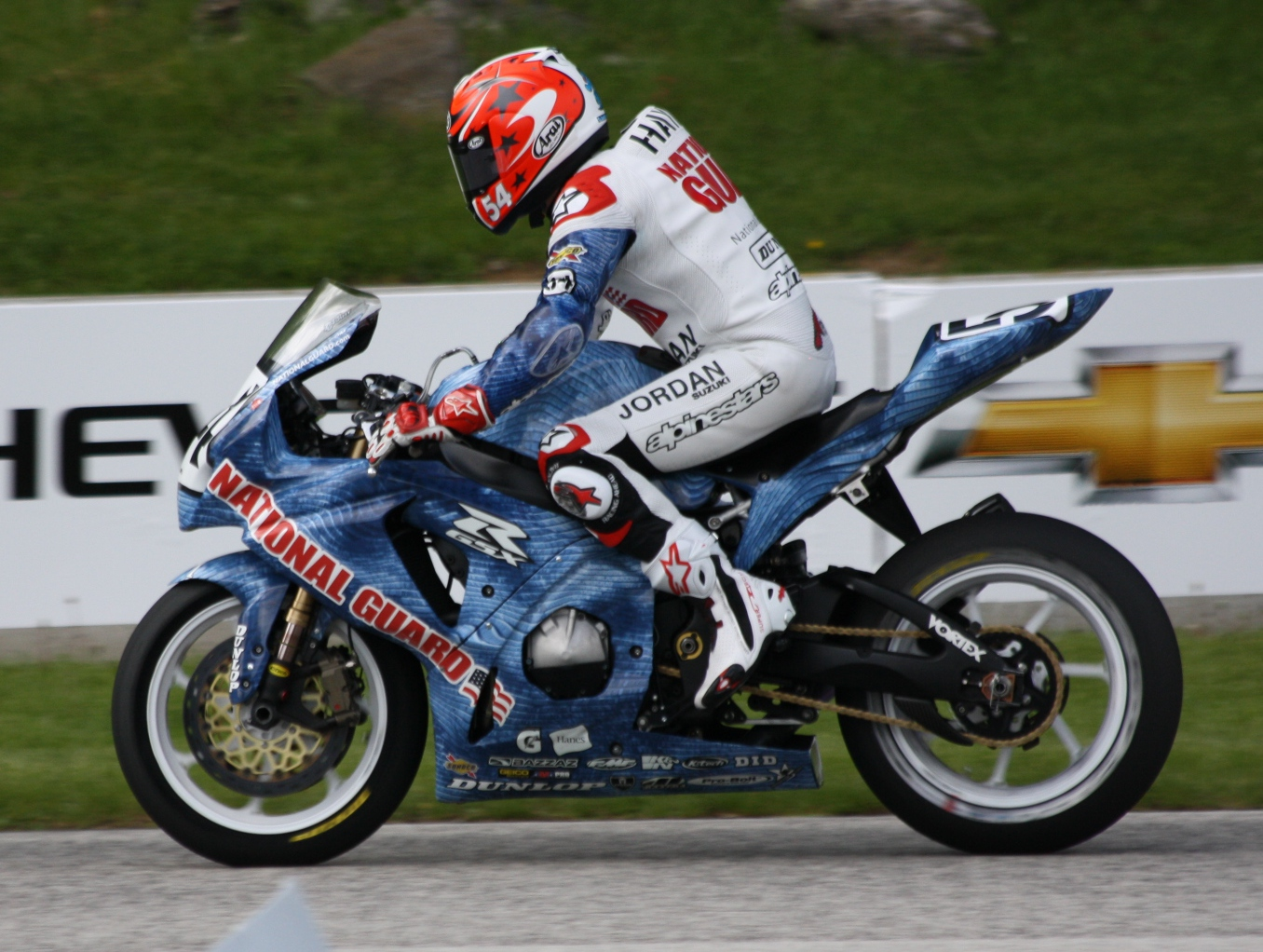
Hayden riding in 2013

In July 2007, Hayden made his MotoGP début as a wild card for Kawasaki at Mazda Raceway Laguna Seca. He piloted the Kawasaki ZX-RR to a tenth-place finish, scoring six points for Kawasaki Motors Racing. On September 16, 2007, at Mazda Raceway Laguna Seca, Hayden clinched the AMA 600 Supersport championship after finishing runner-up twice during the 2004 and 2005 seasons.

Hayden's successful 2007 season was followed by injury in 2008. Hayden fractured his arm in March 2008 during qualifying at Daytona International Speedway. Though he recovered from his arm injury, his season was effectively brought to an end on April 19, 2008, when he was involved in a heavy crash with Robertino Pietri during qualifying at Barber Motorsports Park. As a result of the crash, Hayden suffered three breaks to his pelvis bone, three breaks to his lower left lumbar, and severe lacerations to the pinky finger on his left hand. Hayden's left pinky finger was eventually amputated after specialists determined that the digit could not be repaired. Hayden did not return to AMA competition full-time until Round 3 of the 2009 AMA season at Road Atlanta.

In January 2010, the Pedercini Team announced that Hayden would join the team to contest the 2010 Superbike World Championship season, partnering Matteo Baiocco on a Kawasaki ZX-10R. In July 2010, after Randy de Puniet's injury at the German Grand Prix at the Sachsenring, Team LCR boss Lucio Cecchinello acquired the services of Hayden for the United States Grand Prix. Hayden finished the race in eleventh position, one place lower than his previous MotoGP appearance in 2007. Hayden also contested the Moto2 race at the Indianapolis Grand Prix, riding a Moriwaki run by former World Champion Kevin Schwantz.

== Career statistics ==
=== AMA Pro Racing ===
==== Supersport ====
Season	Make	1	2	3	4	5	6	7	8	9	10	11	Pos	Pts
2004	Kawasaki	DAY; 2	FON; 3	INF; 6	BAR; 1	PPK; 4	RAM; 5	BRD; 2	LAG; 1	M-O; 1	RAT; 1	VIR; 4	2nd	343
2005	Kawasaki	DAY; 21	BAR; 3	FON; 3	INF; 4	PPK; 1	RAM; 2	LAG; 2	M-O; 1	VIR; 1	RAT; 1		2nd	308
2006	Kawasaki	DAY; 1	BAR; 1	FON	INF	RAM; 4	MIL; 2	LAG; 2	M-O; 2	VIR; Ret	RAT; 28	M-O; 1	5th	237
2007	Kawasaki	DAY; 1	BAR; 5	FON; 3	INF; 3	RAM; 3	MIL; 5	LAG; 1	M-O; C	VIR; 4	RAT; 3	LAG; 3	1st	271
2008	Kawasaki	DAY; 3	BAR	FON	INF	MIL	RAM	LAG	M-O; Ret	VIR; 14	RAT	LAG	29th	46

==== Superstock ====
Season	Make	1	2	3	4	5	6	7	8	9	10	11	Pos	Pts
2004	Kawasaki	DAY; 5	FON; 6	INF; 11	BAR; 3	PPK; 3	RAM; 6	BRD; 5	LAG; 2	M-O; 3	RAT; 4	VIR; Ret	6th	268
2005	Kawasaki	DAY; 11	BAR; 8	FON; 31	INF; 7	PPK; 7	RAM; 4	LAG; 3	M-O; 5	VIR; 2	RAT; 1		4th	241

==== Superbike ====
Season	Make	1	2		3		4		5		6		7	8		9		10		11	Pts	Pos
Season	Make	1	R1	R2	R1	R2	R1	R2	R1	R2	R1	R2	7	R1	R2	R1	R2	R1	R2	11	Pts	Pos
2006	Kawasaki	DAY; 22	BAR; 14	BAR; 25	FON	FON	INF	INF	RAM	RAM	MIL	MIL	LAG; 11	M-O; 8	M-O; 8	VIR; 9	VIR; 7	RAT; 22	RAT; 6	M-O; Ret	17th	178
2007	Kawasaki	DAY; Ret	BAR; 11	BAR; 9	FON; 8	FON; 7	INF; 6	INF; 25	RAM; 7	RAM; Ret	MIL; 4	MIL; 5	LAG	M-O; 5	M-O; 8	VIR; 5	VIR; 10	RAT; 6	RAT; 5	LAG; 5	8th	344
2008	Kawasaki	DAY; 8	BAR	BAR	FON	FON	INF	INF	MIL	MIL	RAM	RAM	LAG; 6	M-O; 6	M-O; Ret	VIR; 7	VIR; DNS	RAT	RAT	LAG	22nd	97

==== Daytona Sportbike ====
Season	Make	1	2		3		4		5		6		7	8		9		10		11		Pts	Pos
Season	Make	1	R1	R2	R1	R2	R1	R2	R1	R2	R1	R2	7	R1	R2	R1	R2	R1	R2	R1	R2	Pts	Pos
2009	Kawasaki	DAY	FON	FON	RAT; 2	RAT; 31	BAR; 14	BAR; 37	INF; 9	INF; 40	RAM; 2	RAM; 11	LAG; 38	M-O; 40	M-O; 5	HRT; 9	HRT; 7	VIR; 10	VIR; 5	NJ; 38	NJ; 6	12th	164

=== MotoAmerica Superbike Championship ===
Year	Class	Team	1		2		3		4		5		6		7	8		9		10		11	Pos	Pts
Year	Class	Team	R1	R2	R1	R2	R1	R2	R1	R2	R1	R2	R1	R2	R1	R1	R2	R1	R2	R1	R2	R1	Pos	Pts
2008	SuperBike	Suzuki	DAY; 8		BAR; Ret	BAR; Ret	FON	FON	INF	INF	MIL	MIL	RAM	RAM	LAG; 6	OHI	OHI	VIR	VIR	RAT	RAT	LAG	30th	23
2011	SuperBike	Suzuki	DAY; 5	DAY; 15	INF; 18	INF; 7	UTA; 4		RAM; 6	RAM; 5	BAR; 6	BAR; 18	MOH; 4	MOH; 3	LAG; 4	NJE; 4	NJE; 3						6th	202

=== Grand Prix motorcycle racing results ===
(key)

Year	Class	Bike	1	2	3	4	5	6	7	8	9	10	11	12	13	14	15	16	17	18	Pos	Pts
2007	MotoGP	Kawasaki	QAT	SPA	TUR	CHN	FRA	ITA	CAT	GBR	NED	GER	USA; 10	CZE	RSM	POR	JPN	AUS	MAL	VAL	20th	6
2010	MotoGP	Honda	QAT	SPA	FRA	ITA	GBR	NED	CAT	GER	USA; 11	CZE									19th	5
2010	Moto2	Moriwaki											INP; 17	SMR	ARA	JPN	MAL	AUS	POR	VAL	NC	0

=== Superbike World Championship ===
Year	Make	1		2		3		4		5		6		7		8		9		10		11		12		13		Pos	Pts
Year	Make	R1	R2	R1	R2	R1	R2	R1	R2	R1	R2	R1	R2	R1	R2	R1	R2	R1	R2	R1	R2	R1	R2	R1	R2	R1	R2	Pos	Pts
2010	Kawasaki	AUS; 18	AUS; 18	POR; 18	POR; 17	SPA; 16	SPA; 19	NED; 19	NED; 16	ITA; 19	ITA; 14	RSA; Ret	RSA; 19	USA; 16	USA; Ret	SMR; 17	SMR; 18	CZE; 14	CZE; 13	GBR; Ret	GBR; 17	GER; 13	GER; 16	ITA; Ret	ITA; Ret	FRA; Ret	FRA; Ret	19th	10
