= 2010 Superbike World Championship =

2010 Superbike World Championship
Previous:	2009	Next:	2011
Support series: Supersport World Championship; FIM Superstock 1000 Cup; European Superstock 600 Championship

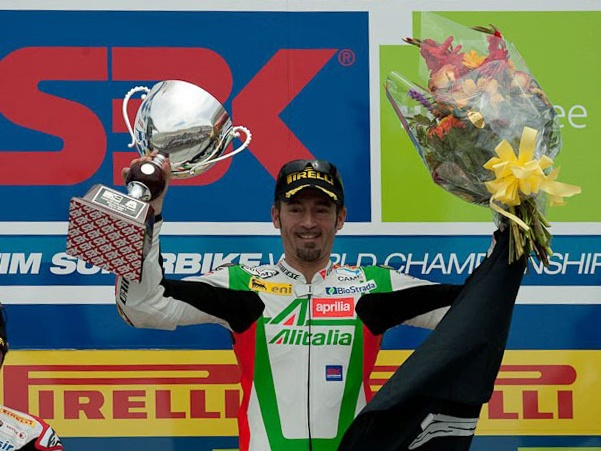
Max Biaggi won his, and Aprilia's first Superbike World Championship title.

The 2010 Superbike World Championship (officially known as the HANNspree SBK Superbike World Championship for sponsorship reasons) was the twenty-third season of the Superbike World Championship. It was the third season in which HANNspree had been the title sponsor of the championship.

After Leon Haslam's retirement during the second race at Imola, Max Biaggi became the first Italian winner of the championship, and also claimed the first title by an Aprilia rider.

== Race calendar and results ==
The provisional 2010 race schedule was publicly announced by FIM on 6 October 2009 with the most notable change from the 2009 season being the dropping of the round at Losail, Qatar. For the first time in series history, races were run on a day other than Sunday, with the races at Miller Motorsports Park being held on Monday 31 May. These races were run as part of the Memorial Day weekend in the United States. The FIM altered the calendar on 22 January 2010 with Silverstone replacing Donington Park as the host of the British round.

2010 Superbike World Championship Calendar
Round		Country	Circuit	Date	Superpole	Fastest lap	Winning rider	Winning team	Report
1	R1	Australia	Phillip Island Grand Prix Circuit	28 February	(United Kingdom) Leon Haslam	(United Kingdom) Leon Haslam	(United Kingdom) Leon Haslam	Team Suzuki Alstare	Report
1	R2	Australia	Phillip Island Grand Prix Circuit	28 February	(United Kingdom) Leon Haslam	(France) Sylvain Guintoli	(Spain) Carlos Checa	Althea Racing	Report
2	R1	Portugal	Autódromo Internacional do Algarve	28 March	(United Kingdom) Cal Crutchlow	(Italy) Max Biaggi	(Italy) Max Biaggi	Aprilia Alitalia Racing	Report
2	R2	Portugal	Autódromo Internacional do Algarve	28 March	(United Kingdom) Cal Crutchlow	(Spain) Carlos Checa	(Italy) Max Biaggi	Aprilia Alitalia Racing	Report
3	R1	Spain	Circuit Ricardo Tormo	11 April	(United Kingdom) Cal Crutchlow	(Spain) Carlos Checa	(United Kingdom) Leon Haslam	Team Suzuki Alstare	Report
3	R2	Spain	Circuit Ricardo Tormo	11 April	(United Kingdom) Cal Crutchlow	(Italy) Max Biaggi	(Japan) Noriyuki Haga	Ducati Xerox Team	Report
4	R1	Netherlands	TT Circuit Assen	25 April	(United Kingdom) Jonathan Rea	(Spain) Carlos Checa	(United Kingdom) Jonathan Rea	HANNspree Ten Kate Honda	Report
4	R2	Netherlands	TT Circuit Assen	25 April	(United Kingdom) Jonathan Rea	(United Kingdom) Jonathan Rea	(United Kingdom) Jonathan Rea	HANNspree Ten Kate Honda	Report
5	R1	Italy	Autodromo Nazionale di Monza	9 May	(Italy) Max Biaggi	(United Kingdom) Jonathan Rea	(Italy) Max Biaggi	Aprilia Alitalia Racing	Report
5	R2	Italy	Autodromo Nazionale di Monza	9 May	(Italy) Max Biaggi	(United Kingdom) Cal Crutchlow	(Italy) Max Biaggi	Aprilia Alitalia Racing	Report
6	R1	South Africa	Kyalami	16 May	(United Kingdom) Cal Crutchlow	(Italy) Michel Fabrizio	(Italy) Michel Fabrizio	Ducati Xerox Team	Report
6	R2	South Africa	Kyalami	16 May	(United Kingdom) Cal Crutchlow	(United Kingdom) Jonathan Rea	(United Kingdom) Leon Haslam	Team Suzuki Alstare	Report
7	R1	United States	Miller Motorsports Park	31 May	(Spain) Carlos Checa	(Spain) Carlos Checa	(Italy) Max Biaggi	Aprilia Alitalia Racing	Report
7	R2	United States	Miller Motorsports Park	31 May	(Spain) Carlos Checa	(Spain) Carlos Checa	(Italy) Max Biaggi	Aprilia Alitalia Racing	Report
8	R1	San Marino	Misano World Circuit	27 June	(Australia) Troy Corser	(Spain) Carlos Checa	(Italy) Max Biaggi	Aprilia Alitalia Racing	Report
8	R2	San Marino	Misano World Circuit	27 June	(Australia) Troy Corser	(United Kingdom) Cal Crutchlow	(Italy) Max Biaggi	Aprilia Alitalia Racing	Report
9	R1	Czech Republic	Masaryk Circuit	11 July	(United Kingdom) Cal Crutchlow	(United Kingdom) Cal Crutchlow	(United Kingdom) Jonathan Rea	HANNspree Ten Kate Honda	Report
9	R2	Czech Republic	Masaryk Circuit	11 July	(United Kingdom) Cal Crutchlow	(United Kingdom) Cal Crutchlow	(Italy) Max Biaggi	Aprilia Alitalia Racing	Report
10	R1	(United Kingdom) Great Britain	Silverstone Circuit	1 August	(United Kingdom) Cal Crutchlow	(United Kingdom) Cal Crutchlow	(United Kingdom) Cal Crutchlow	Yamaha Sterilgarda Team	Report
10	R2	(United Kingdom) Great Britain	Silverstone Circuit	1 August	(United Kingdom) Cal Crutchlow	(United Kingdom) Cal Crutchlow	(United Kingdom) Cal Crutchlow	Yamaha Sterilgarda Team	Report
11	R1	Germany	Nürburgring	5 September	(Italy) Max Biaggi	(United Kingdom) Jonathan Rea	(United Kingdom) Jonathan Rea	HANNspree Ten Kate Honda	Report
11	R2	Germany	Nürburgring	5 September	(Italy) Max Biaggi	(United Kingdom) Jonathan Rea	(Japan) Noriyuki Haga	Ducati Xerox Team	Report
12	R1	Italy	Autodromo Enzo e Dino Ferrari	26 September	(United Kingdom) Tom Sykes	(United Kingdom) Leon Haslam	(Spain) Carlos Checa	Althea Racing	Report
12	R2	Italy	Autodromo Enzo e Dino Ferrari	26 September	(United Kingdom) Tom Sykes	(Spain) Carlos Checa	(Spain) Carlos Checa	Althea Racing	Report
13	R1	France	Circuit de Nevers Magny-Cours	3 October	(United Kingdom) Cal Crutchlow	(United Kingdom) Cal Crutchlow	(United Kingdom) Cal Crutchlow	Yamaha Sterilgarda Team	Report
13	R2	France	Circuit de Nevers Magny-Cours	3 October	(United Kingdom) Cal Crutchlow	(United Kingdom) Cal Crutchlow	(Italy) Max Biaggi	Aprilia Alitalia Racing	Report

== Championship standings ==
=== Riders' standings ===
2010 final riders' standings
Pos.	Rider	Bike	AUS (Australia)		POR (Portugal)		SPA (Spain)		NED (Netherlands)		ITA (Italy)		RSA (South Africa)		USA (United States)		SMR (San Marino)		CZE (Czech Republic)		GBR (United Kingdom)		GER (Germany)		ITA (Italy)		FRA (France)		Pts
Pos.	Rider	Bike	R1	R2	R1	R2	R1	R2	R1	R2	R1	R2	R1	R2	R1	R2	R1	R2	R1	R2	R1	R2	R1	R2	R1	R2	R1	R2	Pts
1	(Italy) Max Biaggi	Aprilia	5	8	1	1	2	3	6	4	**1**	**1**	4	3	1	1	1	1	2	1	5	6	**4**	**5**	11	5	4	1	451
2	(United Kingdom) Leon Haslam	Suzuki	**1**	**2**	2	2	1	4	11	2	4	2	3	1	2	Ret	8	2	8	10	3	4	6	3	5	Ret	2	10	376
3	(Spain) Carlos Checa	Ducati	7	1	4	4	Ret	2	4	6	14	11	2	5	**Ret**	**Ret**	2	5	9	6	7	10	2	Ret	1	1	3	9	297
4	(United Kingdom) Jonathan Rea	Honda	4	6	3	Ret	6	5	**1**	**1**	Ret	Ret	5	2	14	8	13	12	1	2	2	2	1	2	DNS	DNS	12	DNS	292
5	(United Kingdom) Cal Crutchlow	Yamaha	Ret	9	**14**	**3**	**7**	**9**	8	Ret	3	Ret	**8**	**4**	11	3	Ret	4	**3**	**14**	**1**	**1**	3	4	10	3	**1**	**2**	284
6	(Japan) Noriyuki Haga	Ducati	3	5	8	8	5	1	10	Ret	11	6	17	10	3	4	7	9	6	5	14	13	Ret	1	3	2	7	5	258
7	(France) Sylvain Guintoli	Suzuki	6	4	13	9	9	6	14	13	10	7	10	15	8	6	5	6	4	7	12	7	8	6	9	8	DSQ	4	197
8	(Italy) Michel Fabrizio	Ducati	2	3	11	11	Ret	Ret	13	12	7	Ret	1	8	Ret	9	4	3	Ret	3	4	Ret	Ret	19	7	Ret	6	3	195
9	(United Kingdom) James Toseland	Yamaha	Ret	10	7	6	3	7	2	3	2	Ret	7	6	9	Ret	10	Ret	7	4	8	5	Ret	8	Ret	Ret	Ret	Ret	187
10	(United Kingdom) Shane Byrne	Ducati	14	12	6	7	Ret	8	9	8	13	9	15	13	6	7	9	7	12	9	9	8	9	10	8	6	9	8	169
11	(Australia) Troy Corser	BMW	9	7	9	10	4	12	5	5	8	3	12	7	5	5	**3**	**10**	DNS	DNS	10	Ret	Ret	12	15	11	Ret	Ret	165
12	(United Kingdom) Leon Camier	Aprilia	11	11	5	5	Ret	Ret	3	Ret	5	4	6	Ret	4	2	6	11	Ret	8	6	3	DNS	DNS					164
13	(Czech Republic) Jakub Smrž	Ducati	8	Ret	Ret	Ret	10	10	7	7	15	8	9	9	Ret	Ret	Ret	Ret											110
13	(Czech Republic) Jakub Smrž	Aprilia																	Ret	Ret	13	9	Ret	11	4	Ret	5	6	110
14	(United Kingdom) Tom Sykes	Kawasaki	13	Ret	15	13	11	15	12	Ret	9	5	16	14	13	14	15	16	11	Ret	18	14	5	7	**6**	**4**	7	11	106
15	(Spain) Rubén Xaus	BMW	DNS	DNS	10	12	12	11	Ret	10	6	Ret	14	11	10	11	Ret	Ret	5	Ret	17	11	7	9	12	9	Ret	DNS	96
16	(Italy) Lorenzo Lanzi	Ducati	10	13	12	14	8	13	16	Ret	17	Ret					12	13	10	11	15	15	11	13	2	7	11	Ret	88
17	(Italy) Luca Scassa	Ducati			20	16	14	14	15	11	16	10	11	12	7	10	11	8	Ret	DNS	DNS	DNS	10	14	13	10	10	7	85
18	(Germany) Max Neukirchner	Honda	12	16	Ret	15	13	17	20	9	12	12	19	17	12	12	14	14	Ret	Ret	11	Ret	Ret	15	14	12	13	12	54
19	(United States) Roger Lee Hayden	Kawasaki	18	18	18	17	16	19	19	16	19	14	Ret	19	16	Ret	17	18	14	13	Ret	17	13	16	Ret	Ret	Ret	Ret	10
20	(Australia) Chris Vermeulen	Kawasaki	Ret	Ret	DNS	DNS			17	14	18	13	18	16	15	13	16	15	Ret	Ret									10
21	(United Kingdom) Ian Lowry	Kawasaki																					12	Ret	17	16	14	13	9
22	(Australia) Broc Parkes	Honda							Ret	17	20	15	Ret	18	17	15	DSQ	17	13	12	Ret	Ret							9
23	(Italy) Matteo Baiocco	Kawasaki	17	Ret	19	18	17	20	18	15	DSQ	Ret	Ret	20	18	Ret	19	19	15	15	Ret	20	14	17	18	15	15	14	9
24	(Australia) Josh Brookes	Honda	19	14																	16	12							6
25	(Italy) Federico Sandi	Aprilia															18	20							16	13			3
26	(South Africa) Sheridan Morais	Honda			17	Ret	DNS	DNS					13	Ret															3
27	(Australia) Andrew Pitt	BMW	15	15	Ret	20	15	16																					3
28	(Italy) Fabrizio Lai	Honda																					Ret	18	19	14	16	Ret	2
	(Italy) Vittorio Iannuzzo	Honda	16	17	16	Ret	Ret	Ret			Ret	Ret																	0
	(Japan) Ryuichi Kiyonari	Honda																			21	16							0
	(United Kingdom) Tommy Bridewell	Honda																			20	18							0
	(Austria) Roland Resch	BMW	DNS	DNS			Ret	18																					0
	(United Kingdom) Simon Andrews	Kawasaki					18	Ret																					0
	(Japan) Akira Yanagawa	Kawasaki																			19	19							0
	(Japan) Makoto Tamada	BMW			Ret	19																							0
	(Japan) Daisaku Sakai	Suzuki									Ret	DNS																	0
Pos.	Rider	Bike	AUS (Australia)		POR (Portugal)		SPA (Spain)		NED (Netherlands)		ITA (Italy)		RSA (South Africa)		USA (United States)		SMR (San Marino)		CZE (Czech Republic)		GBR (United Kingdom)		GER (Germany)		ITA (Italy)		FRA (France)		Pts

Colour	Result
Gold	Winner
Silver	Second place
Bronze	Third place
Green	Points classification
Blue	Non-points classification
Blue	Non-classified finish (NC)
Purple	Retired, not classified (Ret)
Red	Did not qualify (DNQ)
Red	Did not pre-qualify (DNPQ)
Black	Disqualified (DSQ)
White	Did not start (DNS)
White	Withdrew (WD)
White	Race cancelled (C)
Blank	Did not practice (DNP)
Blank	Did not arrive (DNA)
Blank	Excluded (EX)

**Bold** – Pole position
Italics – Fastest lap

=== Teams' standings ===
Pos.	Team	Bike No.	AUS (Australia)		POR (Portugal)		SPA (Spain)		NED (Netherlands)		ITA (Italy)		RSA (South Africa)		USA (United States)		SMR (San Marino)		CZE (Czech Republic)		GBR (United Kingdom)		GER (Germany)		ITA (Italy)		FRA (France)		Pts.
Pos.	Team	Bike No.	R1	R2	R1	R2	R1	R2	R1	R2	R1	R2	R1	R2	R1	R2	R1	R2	R1	R2	R1	R2	R1	R2	R1	R2	R1	R2	Pts.
1	(Italy) Aprilia Alitalia Racing	3	5	8	1	1	2	3	6	4	**1**	**1**	4	3	1	1	1	1	2	1	5	6	**4**	**5**	11	5	4	1	615
1	(Italy) Aprilia Alitalia Racing	2	11	11	5	5	Ret	Ret	3	Ret	5	4	6	Ret	4	2	6	11	Ret	8	6	3	DNS	DNS					615
2	(Belgium) Team Suzuki Alstare	91	**1**	**2**	2	2	1	4	11	2	4	2	3	1	2	Ret	8	2	8	10	3	4	6	3	5	Ret	2	10	573
2	(Belgium) Team Suzuki Alstare	50	6	4	13	9	9	6	14	13	10	7	10	15	8	6	5	6	4	7	12	7	8	6	9	8	DSQ	4	573
3	(Japan) Yamaha Sterilgarda Team	35	Ret	9	**14**	**3**	**7**	**9**	8	Ret	3	Ret	**8**	**4**	11	3	Ret	4	**3**	**14**	**1**	**1**	3	4	10	3	**1**	**2**	471
3	(Japan) Yamaha Sterilgarda Team	52	Ret	10	7	6	3	7	2	3	2	Ret	7	6	9	Ret	10	Ret	7	4	8	5	Ret	8	Ret	Ret	Ret	Ret	471
4	(Italy) Althea Racing	7	7	1	4	4	Ret	2	4	6	14	11	2	5	**Ret**	**Ret**	2	5	9	6	7	10	2	Ret	1	1	3	9	466
4	(Italy) Althea Racing	67	14	12	6	7	Ret	8	9	8	13	9	15	13	6	7	9	7	12	9	9	8	9	10	8	6	9	8	466
5	(Italy) Ducati Xerox Team	41	3	5	8	8	5	1	10	Ret	11	6	17	10	3	4	7	9	6	5	14	13	Ret	1	3	2	7	5	453
5	(Italy) Ducati Xerox Team	84	2	3	11	11	Ret	Ret	13	12	7	Ret	1	8	Ret	9	4	3	Ret	3	4	Ret	Ret	19	7	Ret	6	3	453
6	(Netherlands) HANNspree Ten Kate Honda	65	4	6	3	Ret	6	5	**1**	**1**	Ret	Ret	5	2	14	8	13	12	1	2	2	2	1	2	DNS	DNS	12	DNS	346
6	(Netherlands) HANNspree Ten Kate Honda	76	12	16	Ret	15	13	17	20	9	12	12	19	17	12	12	14	14	Ret	Ret	11	Ret	Ret	15	14	12	13	12	346
7	(Germany) BMW Motorrad Motorsport	11	9	7	9	10	4	12	5	5	8	3	12	7	5	5	**3**	**10**	DNS	DNS	10	Ret	Ret	12	15	11	Ret	Ret	261
7	(Germany) BMW Motorrad Motorsport	111	DNS	DNS	10	12	12	11	Ret	10	6	Ret	14	11	10	11	Ret	Ret	5	Ret	17	11	7	9	12	9	Ret	DNS	261
8	(Japan) Kawasaki Racing Team	66	13	Ret	15	13	11	15	12	Ret	9	5	16	14	13	14	15	16	11	Ret	18	14	5	7	**6**	**4**	7	11	125
8	(Japan) Kawasaki Racing Team	77	Ret	Ret	DNS	DNS			17	14	18	13	18	16	15	13	16	15	Ret	Ret									125
8	(Japan) Kawasaki Racing Team	5																					12	Ret	17	16	14	13	125
8	(Japan) Kawasaki Racing Team	17					18	Ret																					125
8	(Japan) Kawasaki Racing Team	87																			19	19							125
9	(Italy) Team PATA B&G Racing	96	8	Ret	Ret	Ret	10	10	7	7	15	8	9	9	Ret	Ret	Ret	Ret	Ret	Ret	13	9	Ret	11	4	Ret	5	6	110
10	(Italy) DFX Corse	57	10	13	12	14	8	13	16	Ret	17	Ret					12	13	10	11	15	15	11	13	2	7	11	Ret	88
11	(Italy) Supersonic Racing Team	99			20	16	14	14	15	11	16	10	11	12	7	10	11	8	Ret	DNS	DNS	DNS	10	14	13	10	10	7	85
12	(Italy) Team Pedercini	95	18	18	18	17	16	19	19	16	19	14	Ret	19	16	Ret	17	18	14	13	Ret	17	13	16	Ret	Ret	Ret	Ret	19
12	(Italy) Team Pedercini	15	17	Ret	19	18	17	20	18	15	DSQ	Ret	Ret	20	18	Ret	19	19	15	15	Ret	20	14	17	18	15	15	14	19
13	(Italy) Echo CRS Honda	23							Ret	17	20	15	Ret	18	17	15	DSQ	17	13	12	Ret	Ret							13
13	(Italy) Echo CRS Honda	25	19	14																									13
13	(Italy) Echo CRS Honda	33																					Ret	18	19	14	16	Ret	13
13	(Italy) Echo CRS Honda	32			17	Ret	DNS	DNS																					13
14	(Germany) Team Reitwagen BMW	88	15	15	Ret	20	15	16																					3
14	(Germany) Team Reitwagen BMW	123	DNS	DNS			Ret	18																					3
14	(Germany) Team Reitwagen BMW	49			Ret	19																							3
	(Italy) Squadra Corse Italia Honda Garvie Image	31	16	17	16	Ret	Ret	Ret			Ret	Ret																	0
Pos.	Team	Bike No.	AUS (Australia)		POR (Portugal)		SPA (Spain)		NED (Netherlands)		ITA (Italy)		RSA (South Africa)		USA (United States)		SMR (San Marino)		CZE (Czech Republic)		GBR (United Kingdom)		GER (Germany)		ITA (Italy)		FRA (France)		Pts.

=== Manufacturers' standings ===
Pos.	Manufacturer	AUS (Australia)		POR (Portugal)		SPA (Spain)		NED (Netherlands)		ITA (Italy)		RSA (South Africa)		USA (United States)		SMR (San Marino)		CZE (Czech Republic)		GBR (United Kingdom)		GER (Germany)		ITA (Italy)		FRA (France)		Pts
Pos.	Manufacturer	R1	R2	R1	R2	R1	R2	R1	R2	R1	R2	R1	R2	R1	R2	R1	R2	R1	R2	R1	R2	R1	R2	R1	R2	R1	R2	Pts
1	(Italy) Aprilia	5	8	1	1	2	3	3	4	1	1	4	3	1	1	1	1	2	1	5	3	4	5	4	5	4	1	471
2	(Italy) Ducati	2	1	4	4	5	1	4	6	7	6	1	5	3	4	2	3	6	3	4	8	2	1	1	1	3	3	424
3	(Japan) Suzuki	1	2	2	2	1	4	11	2	4	2	3	1	2	6	5	2	4	7	3	4	6	3	5	8	2	4	412
4	(Japan) Yamaha	Ret	9	7	3	3	7	2	3	2	Ret	7	4	9	3	10	4	3	4	1	1	3	4	10	3	1	2	352
5	(Japan) Honda	4	6	3	15	6	5	1	1	12	12	5	2	12	8	13	12	1	2	2	2	1	2	14	12	12	12	313
6	(Germany) BMW	9	7	9	10	4	11	5	5	6	3	12	7	5	5	3	10	5	Ret	10	11	7	9	12	9	Ret	Ret	201
7	(Japan) Kawasaki	13	Ret	15	13	11	15	12	15	9	5	16	14	13	13	15	15	11	13	18	14	5	7	6	4	8	11	113
Pos.	Manufacturer	AUS (Australia)		POR (Portugal)		SPA (Spain)		NED (Netherlands)		ITA (Italy)		RSA (South Africa)		USA (United States)		SMR (San Marino)		CZE (Czech Republic)		GBR (United Kingdom)		GER (Germany)		ITA (Italy)		FRA (France)		Pts

== Entry list ==
2010 entry list
Team	Constructor	Motorcycle	No	Rider	Rounds
(Italy) Aprilia Alitalia Racing	Aprilia	Aprilia RSV4 1000	2	(United Kingdom) Leon Camier	1–11
(Italy) Aprilia Alitalia Racing	Aprilia	Aprilia RSV4 1000	3	(Italy) Max Biaggi	All
(Japan) Kawasaki Racing Team	Kawasaki	Kawasaki ZX-10R	5	(United Kingdom) Ian Lowry	11–13
(Japan) Kawasaki Racing Team	Kawasaki	Kawasaki ZX-10R	17	(United Kingdom) Simon Andrews	3
(Japan) Kawasaki Racing Team	Kawasaki	Kawasaki ZX-10R	66	(United Kingdom) Tom Sykes	All
(Japan) Kawasaki Racing Team	Kawasaki	Kawasaki ZX-10R	77	(Australia) Chris Vermeulen	1–2, 4–9
(Japan) Kawasaki Racing Team	Kawasaki	Kawasaki ZX-10R	87	(Japan) Akira Yanagawa	10
(Italy) Althea Racing	Ducati	Ducati 1098R	7	(Spain) Carlos Checa	All
(Italy) Althea Racing	Ducati	Ducati 1098R	67	(United Kingdom) Shane Byrne	All
(United Kingdom) HM Plant Honda	Honda	Honda CBR1000RR	8	(Japan) Ryuichi Kiyonari	10
(United Kingdom) HM Plant Honda	Honda	Honda CBR1000RR	25	(Australia) Josh Brookes	10
(Germany) BMW Motorrad Motorsport	BMW	BMW S1000RR	11	(Australia) Troy Corser	All
(Germany) BMW Motorrad Motorsport	BMW	BMW S1000RR	111	(Spain) Rubén Xaus	All
(Italy) Team Pedercini	Kawasaki	Kawasaki ZX-10R	15	(Italy) Matteo Baiocco	All
(Italy) Team Pedercini	Kawasaki	Kawasaki ZX-10R	95	(United States) Roger Lee Hayden	All
(Italy) Echo CRS Honda	Honda	Honda CBR1000RR	23	(Australia) Broc Parkes	4–10
(Italy) Echo CRS Honda	Honda	Honda CBR1000RR	25	(Australia) Josh Brookes	1
(Italy) Echo CRS Honda	Honda	Honda CBR1000RR	32	(South Africa) Sheridan Morais	2–3
(Italy) Echo CRS Honda	Honda	Honda CBR1000RR	33	(Italy) Fabrizio Lai	11–13
(Italy) Squadra Corse Italia Honda Garvie Image	Honda	Honda CBR1000RR	31	(Italy) Vittorio Iannuzzo	1–3, 5
(Italy) EmTek Racing	Aprilia	Aprilia RSV4 1000	32	(South Africa) Sheridan Morais	6
(Japan) Yamaha Sterilgarda Team	Yamaha	Yamaha YZF-R1	35	(United Kingdom) Cal Crutchlow	All
(Japan) Yamaha Sterilgarda Team	Yamaha	Yamaha YZF-R1	52	(United Kingdom) James Toseland	All
(Italy) Ducati Xerox Team	Ducati	Ducati 1098R	41	(Japan) Noriyuki Haga	All
(Italy) Ducati Xerox Team	Ducati	Ducati 1098R	84	(Italy) Michel Fabrizio	All
(United Kingdom) Tyco Racing Honda	Honda	Honda CBR1000RR	46	(United Kingdom) Tommy Bridewell	10
(Germany) Team Reitwagen BMW	BMW	BMW S1000RR	49	(Japan) Makoto Tamada	2
(Germany) Team Reitwagen BMW	BMW	BMW S1000RR	88	(Australia) Andrew Pitt	1–3
(Germany) Team Reitwagen BMW	BMW	BMW S1000RR	123	(Austria) Roland Resch	1, 3
(Belgium) Team Suzuki Alstare	Suzuki	Suzuki GSX-R1000	50	(France) Sylvain Guintoli	All
(Belgium) Team Suzuki Alstare	Suzuki	Suzuki GSX-R1000	91	(United Kingdom) Leon Haslam	All
(Italy) DFX Corse	Ducati	Ducati 1098R	57	(Italy) Lorenzo Lanzi	1–5, 8–13
(Netherlands) HANNspree Ten Kate Honda	Honda	Honda CBR1000RR	65	(United Kingdom) Jonathan Rea	All
(Netherlands) HANNspree Ten Kate Honda	Honda	Honda CBR1000RR	76	(Germany) Max Neukirchner	All
(Japan) Yoshimura Suzuki	Suzuki	Suzuki GSX-R1000	71	(Japan) Daisaku Sakai	5
(Italy) Gabrielli Racing	Aprilia	Aprilia RSV4 1000	90	(Italy) Federico Sandi	8, 12
(Italy) Team PATA B&G Racing	Ducati	Ducati 1098R	96	(Czech Republic) Jakub Smrž	1–8
(Italy) Team PATA B&G Racing	Aprilia	Aprilia RSV4 1000	96	(Czech Republic) Jakub Smrž	9–13
(Italy) Supersonic Racing Team	Ducati	Ducati 1098R	99	(Italy) Luca Scassa	2–13

Key
Regular rider
Wildcard rider
Replacement rider

- All entries used Pirelli tyres.
