= 2010 Nürburgring Superbike World Championship round =

(Germany) 2010 Nürburgring Superbike World Championship round
Round details
- Round 11 of 13 rounds in the 2010 Superbike World Championship. and Round 11 of 13 rounds in the 2010 Supersport World Championship.
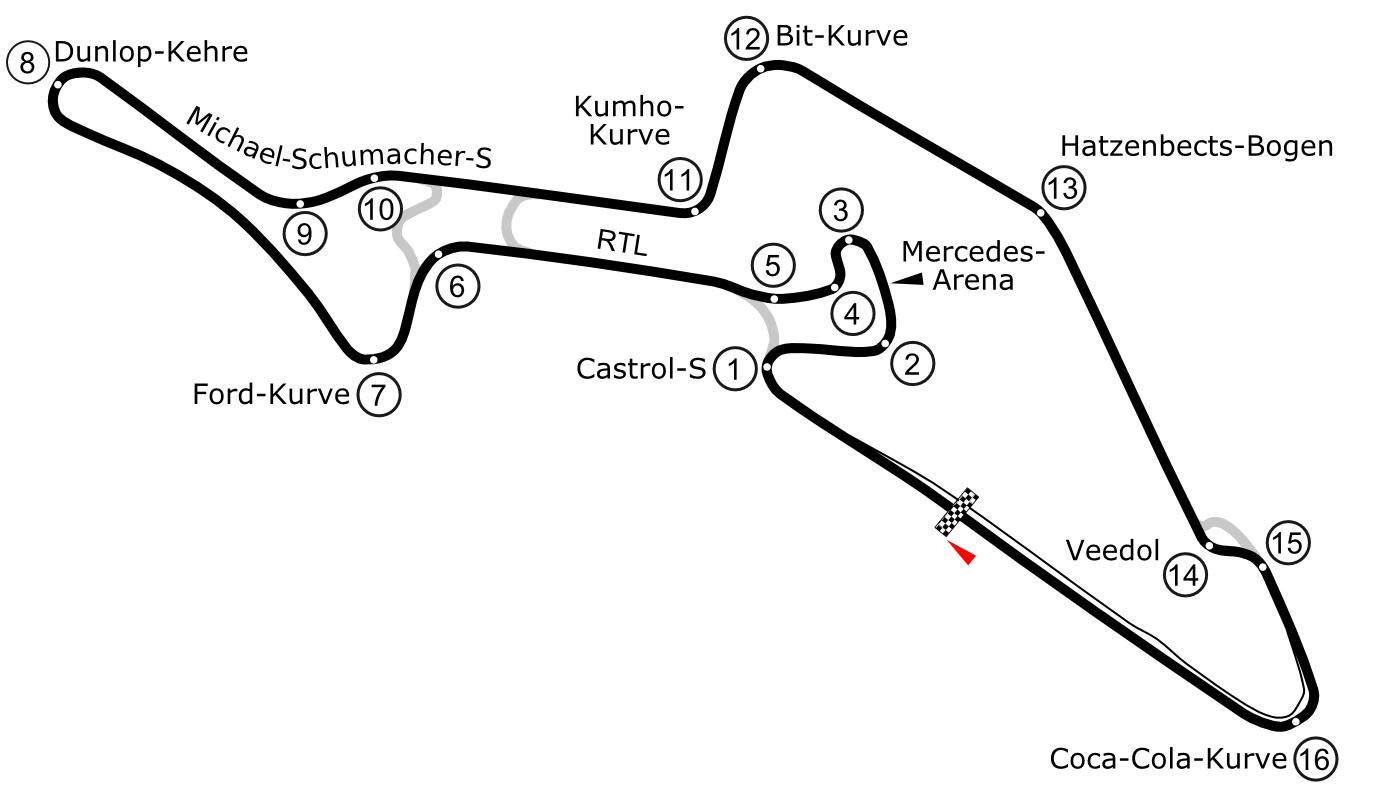
- Date: September 5, 2010
- Location: Nürburgring
- Course: Permanent racing facility 5.137 km (3.192 mi)

Superbike World Championship
Pole position
(Italy) Max Biaggi
1:54.595
Fastest lap race 1	Fastest lap race 2
(United Kingdom) Jonathan Rea	(United Kingdom) Jonathan Rea
1:55.392	1:55.502

Supersport World Championship
Pole position
(Republic of Ireland) Eugene Laverty
1:58.415
Fastest lap
(Republic of Ireland) Eugene Laverty
1:59.027

The 2010 Nürburgring Superbike World Championship round was the eleventh round of the 2010 Superbike World Championship season. It took place on the weekend of September 3–5, 2010, at the Nürburgring.

== Results ==
=== Superbike race 1 classification ===
Race 1 was red flagged after one lap due to a crash involving Leon Haslam and Troy Corser, and later restarted with full length.

Pos	No	Rider	Bike	Laps	Time	Grid	Points
1	65	(United Kingdom) Jonathan Rea	Honda CBR1000RR	20	38:42.640	4	25
2	7	(Spain) Carlos Checa	Ducati 1098R	20	+1.126	2	20
3	35	(United Kingdom) Cal Crutchlow	Yamaha YZF R1	20	+10.006	10	16
4	3	(Italy) Max Biaggi	Aprilia RSV4 1000 F	20	+10.716	1	13
5	66	(United Kingdom) Tom Sykes	Kawasaki ZX 10R	20	+17.391	7	11
6	91	(United Kingdom) Leon Haslam	Suzuki GSX-R1000	20	+19.301	5	10
7	111	(Spain) Ruben Xaus	BMW S1000RR	20	+19.613	11	9
8	50	(France) Sylvain Guintoli	Suzuki GSX-R1000	20	+19.880	3	8
9	67	(United Kingdom) Shane Byrne	Ducati 1098R	20	+21.176	17	7
10	99	(Italy) Luca Scassa	Ducati 1098R	20	+29.752	16	6
11	57	(Italy) Lorenzo Lanzi	Ducati 1098R	20	+30.156	12	5
12	5	(United Kingdom) Ian Lowry	Kawasaki ZX 10R	20	+53.622	19	4
13	95	(United States) Roger Lee Hayden	Kawasaki ZX 10R	20	+58.820	18	3
14	15	(Italy) Matteo Baiocco	Kawasaki ZX 10R	20	+1:25.906	22	2
Ret	33	(Italy) Fabrizio Lai	Honda CBR1000RR	19	Retirement	21	
Ret	84	(Italy) Michel Fabrizio	Ducati 1098R	12	Retirement	9	
Ret	41	(Japan) Noriyuki Haga	Ducati 1098R	8	Accident	6	
Ret	96	(Czech Republic) Jakub Smrz	Aprilia RSV4 1000 F	6	Accident	13	
Ret	11	(Australia) Troy Corser	BMW S1000RR	6	Retirement	14	
Ret	76	(Germany) Max Neukirchner	Honda CBR1000RR	6	Retirement	15	
Ret	52	(United Kingdom) James Toseland	Yamaha YZF R1	1	Accident	8	
DNS	2	(United Kingdom) Leon Camier	Aprilia RSV4 1000 F		Injured	20	

=== Superbike race 2 classification ===
Pos	No	Rider	Bike	Laps	Time	Grid	Points
1	41	(Japan) Noriyuki Haga	Ducati 1098R	20	38:43.565	6	25
2	65	(United Kingdom) Jonathan Rea	Honda CBR1000RR	20	+3.061	4	20
3	91	(United Kingdom) Leon Haslam	Suzuki GSX-R1000	20	+8.060	5	16
4	35	(United Kingdom) Cal Crutchlow	Yamaha YZF R1	20	+8.457	10	13
5	3	(Italy) Max Biaggi	Aprilia RSV4 1000 F	20	+9.392	1	11
6	50	(France) Sylvain Guintoli	Suzuki GSX-R1000	20	+9.556	3	10
7	66	(United Kingdom) Tom Sykes	Kawasaki ZX 10R	20	+16.819	7	9
8	52	(United Kingdom) James Toseland	Yamaha YZF R1	20	+20.564	8	8
9	111	(Spain) Ruben Xaus	BMW S1000RR	20	+21.040	11	7
10	67	(United Kingdom) Shane Byrne	Ducati 1098R	20	+21.168	17	6
11	96	(Czech Republic) Jakub Smrz	Aprilia RSV4 1000 F	20	+21.734	13	5
12	11	(Australia) Troy Corser	BMW S1000RR	20	+22.746	14	4
13	57	(Italy) Lorenzo Lanzi	Ducati 1098R	20	+24.526	12	3
14	99	(Italy) Luca Scassa	Ducati 1098R	20	+28.218	16	2
15	76	(Germany) Max Neukirchner	Honda CBR1000RR	20	+38.406	15	1
16	95	(United States) Roger Lee Hayden	Kawasaki ZX 10R	20	+1:08.039	18	
17	15	(Italy) Matteo Baiocco	Kawasaki ZX 10R	20	+1:21.294	22	
18	33	(Italy) Fabrizio Lai	Honda CBR1000RR	20	+1:21.362	21	
19	84	(Italy) Michel Fabrizio	Ducati 1098R	20	+1:38.427	9	
Ret	5	(United Kingdom) Ian Lowry	Kawasaki ZX 10R	11	Accident	19	
Ret	7	(Spain) Carlos Checa	Ducati 1098R	9	Accident	2	
DNS	2	(United Kingdom) Leon Camier	Aprilia RSV4 1000 F		Injured	20	

=== Supersport race classification ===
Pos	No	Rider	Bike	Laps	Time	Grid	Points
1	50	(Republic of Ireland) Eugene Laverty	Honda CBR600RR	19	37:52.893	1	25
2	54	(Turkey) Kenan Sofuoğlu	Honda CBR600RR	19	+5.072	2	20
3	23	(Australia) Broc Parkes	Kawasaki ZX-6R	19	+15.890	3	16
4	99	(France) Fabien Foret	Kawasaki ZX-6R	19	+16.911	7	13
5	7	(United Kingdom) Chaz Davies	Triumph Daytona 675	19	+28.380	16	11
6	25	(Spain) David Salom	Triumph Daytona 675	19	+28.495	6	10
7	55	(Italy) Massimo Roccoli	Honda CBR600RR	19	+28.578	9	9
8	51	(Italy) Michele Pirro	Honda CBR600RR	19	+28.787	8	8
9	44	(Italy) Roberto Tamburini	Yamaha YZF R6	19	+1:02.199	14	7
10	9	(Italy) Danilo Dell'Omo	Honda CBR600RR	19	+1:19.432	18	6
11	127	(Denmark) Robbin Harms	Honda CBR600RR	19	+1:24.011	11	5
12	21	(United Kingdom) Christian Iddon	Honda CBR600RR	19	+1:30.504	19	4
13	117	(Portugal) Miguel Praia	Honda CBR600RR	19	+1:51.319	15	3
14	10	(Hungary) Imre Tóth	Honda CBR600RR	18	+1 lap	21	2
Ret	37	(Japan) Katsuaki Fujiwara	Kawasaki ZX-6R	10	Retirement	4	
Ret	14	(France) Matthieu Lagrive	Triumph Daytona 675	10	Retirement	12	
Ret	31	(Italy) Vittorio Iannuzzo	Triumph Daytona 675	7	Retirement	17	
Ret	34	(South Africa) Ronan Quarmby	Honda CBR600RR	7	Retirement	13	
Ret	8	(Switzerland) Bastien Chesaux	Honda CBR600RR	5	Accident	20	
Ret	18	(Australia) Mark Aitchison	Honda CBR600RR	1	Accident	10	
DSQ	4	(United Kingdom) Gino Rea	Honda CBR600RR	19	Technical problem	5	

=== Superstock 1000 race classification ===
Pos	No	Rider	Manufacturer	Laps	Time	Grid	Points
1	86	(Italy) Ayrton Badovini	BMW S1000RR	11	22:02.582	1	25
2	21	(France) Maxime Berger	Honda CBR1000RR	11	+0.906	3	20
3	8	(Italy) Andrea Antonelli	Honda CBR1000RR	11	+3.058	4	16
4	20	(France) Sylvain Barrier	BMW S1000RR	11	+12.078	5	13
5	65	(France) Loris Baz	Yamaha YZF-R1	11	+12.328	13	11
6	119	(Italy) Michele Magnoni	Honda CBR1000RR	11	+12.849	6	10
7	34	(Italy) Davide Giugliano	Suzuki GSX-R1000 K9	11	+14.395	8	9
8	47	(Italy) Eddi La Marra	Honda CBR1000RR	11	+15.560	11	8
9	7	(Austria) René Mähr	Suzuki GSX-R1000 K9	11	+16.011	10	7
10	10	(Italy) Andrea Boscoscuro	Honda CBR1000RR	11	+17.900	12	6
11	53	(Germany) Dominic Lammert	BMW S1000RR	11	+18.956	7	5
12	2	(Italy) Daniele Beretta	BMW S1000RR	11	+20.422	14	4
13	9	(Italy) Danilo Petrucci	Kawasaki ZX-10R	11	+25.728	15	3
14	30	(Switzerland) Michaël Savary	BMW S1000RR	11	+28.273	16	2
15	93	(France) Mathieu Lussiana	BMW S1000RR	11	+36.106	17	1
16	60	(United Kingdom) James Web	Honda CBR1000RR	11	+36.432	22	
17	31	(Netherlands) Roy Ten Napel	Honda CBR1000RR	11	+36.852	19	
18	11	(Spain) Pere Tutusaus	KTM 1190 RC8 R	11	+37.086	18	
19	12	(Spain) Pere Tutusaus	KTM 1190 RC8 R	11	+47.775	20	
20	69	(Czech Republic) Ondřej Ježek	Aprilia RSV4 1000	11	+48.080	21	
21	45	(Norway) Kim Arne Sletten	Yamaha YZF-R1	11	+49.878	26	
22	99	(South Africa) Chris Leeson	Kawasaki ZX-10R	11	+57.876	24	
23	89	(Czech Republic) Michal Salač	Aprilia RSV4 1000	11	+1:01.599	23	
24	55	(Slovakia) Tomáš Svitok	Honda CBR1000RR	11	+1:02.130	25	
25	36	(Brazil) Philippe Thiriet	Honda CBR1000RR	11	+1:03.184	27	
26	64	(Brazil) Danilo Andric	Honda CBR1000RR	11	+1:13.602	29	
Ret	14	(Italy) Lorenzo Baroni	Ducati 1098R	5	Accident	9	
Ret	87	(Italy) Lorenzo Zanetti	Ducati 1098R	4	Technical	2	
Ret	66	(Poland) Mateusz Stoklosa	BMW S1000RR	4	Retirement	28	
DNQ	58	(Romania) Bogdan Vrăjitoru	Honda CBR1000RR		Did not qualify		

=== Superstock 600 race classification ===
Pos	No	Rider	Manufacturer	Laps	Time	Grid	Points
1	11	(France) Jérémy Guarnoni	Yamaha YZF-R6	9	18:47.113	2	25
2	99	(Netherlands) Tony Coveña	Yamaha YZF-R6	9	+0.877	6	20
3	6	(France) Romain Lanusse	Yamaha YZF-R6	9	+2.512	3	16
4	13	(Italy) Dino Lombardi	Yamaha YZF-R6	9	+7.595	7	13
5	32	(Germany) Marc Moser	Triumph Daytona 675	9	+10.297	1	11
6	72	(Norway) Fredrik Karlsen	Yamaha YZF-R6	9	+10.404	9	10
7	343	(Italy) Federico D'Annunzio	Yamaha YZF-R6	9	+11.180	12	9
8	21	(France) Florian Marino	Honda CBR600RR	9	+11.453	8	8
9	27	(Italy) Davide Fanelli	Honda CBR600RR	9	+11.968	11	7
10	45	(Germany) Jan Bühn	Yamaha YZF-R6	9	+17.672	10	6
11	66	(France) Richard De Tournay	Yamaha YZF-R6	9	+17.749	17	5
12	52	(Belgium) Gauthier Duwelz	Yamaha YZF-R6	9	+17.956	16	4
13	81	(Netherlands) Kevin Valk	Yamaha YZF-R6	9	+18.858	15	3
14	69	(France) Nelson Major	Yamaha YZF-R6	9	+18.919	19	2
15	75	(Italy) Francesco Cocco	Yamaha YZF-R6	9	+21.246	13	1
16	19	(Slovakia) Tomáš Krajči	Yamaha YZF-R6	9	+21.838	18	
17	34	(Netherlands) Kevin Van Leuven	Yamaha YZF-R6	9	+26.990	20	
18	9	(United Kingdom) Joshua Elliott	Kawasaki ZX-6R	9	+36.274	4	
19	26	(Romania) Mircea Vrajitoru	Yamaha YZF-R6	9	+41.368	21	
Ret	28	(France) Steven Le Coquen	Yamaha YZF-R6	7	Retirement	14	
Ret	14	(Germany) Daniel Puffe	Yamaha YZF-R6	5	Retirement	22	
Ret	33	(Italy) Giuliano Gregorini	Yamaha YZF-R6	4	Accident	5	
WD	10	(Spain) Nacho Calero	Yamaha YZF-R6		Withdrew		
