= 2010 Assen Superbike World Championship round =

(Netherlands) 2010 Assen Superbike World Championship round
Round details
- Round 4 of 13 rounds in the 2010 Superbike World Championship. and Round 4 of 13 rounds in the 2010 Supersport World Championship.
- Date: April 25, 2010
- Location: Assen
- Course: Permanent racing facility 4.542 km (2.822 mi)

Superbike World Championship
Pole position
(United Kingdom) Jonathan Rea
1:34.944
Fastest lap race 1	Fastest lap race 2
(Spain) Carlos Checa	(United Kingdom) Jonathan Rea
1:36.413	1:36.312

Supersport World Championship
Pole position
(Turkey) Kenan Sofuoğlu
1:37.908
Fastest lap
(Turkey) Kenan Sofuoğlu
1:38.608

The 2010 Assen Superbike World Championship round was the fourth round of the 2010 Superbike World Championship season. It took place on the weekend of April 23–25, 2010 at the TT Circuit Assen located in Assen, Netherlands.

== Results ==
=== Superbike race 1 classification ===
Pos	No	Rider	Manufacturer	Laps	Time	Grid	Points
1	65	(United Kingdom) Jonathan Rea	Honda CBR1000RR	22	35:38.483	1	25
2	52	(United Kingdom) James Toseland	Yamaha YZF-R1	22	+1.106	10	20
3	2	(United Kingdom) Leon Camier	Aprilia RSV4 1000 F	22	+1.249	5	16
4	7	(Spain) Carlos Checa	Ducati 1098R	22	+1.548	6	13
5	11	(Australia) Troy Corser	BMW S1000RR	22	+2.738	3	11
6	3	(Italy) Max Biaggi	Aprilia RSV4 1000 F	22	+2.813	11	10
7	96	(Czech Republic) Jakub Smrž	Ducati 1098R	22	+6.296	2	9
8	35	(United Kingdom) Cal Crutchlow	Yamaha YZF-R1	22	+12.022	9	8
9	67	(United Kingdom) Shane Byrne	Ducati 1098R	22	+12.146	7	7
10	41	(Japan) Noriyuki Haga	Ducati 1098R	22	+19.753	15	6
11	91	(United Kingdom) Leon Haslam	Suzuki GSX-R1000	22	+22.204	4	5
12	66	(United Kingdom) Tom Sykes	Kawasaki ZX-10R	22	+22.282	14	4
13	84	(Italy) Michel Fabrizio	Ducati 1098R	22	+22.780	8	3
14	50	(France) Sylvain Guintoli	Suzuki GSX-R1000	22	+23.364	13	2
15	99	(Italy) Luca Scassa	Ducati 1098R	22	+37.097	17	1
16	57	(Italy) Lorenzo Lanzi	Ducati 1098R	22	+39.467	18	
17	77	(Australia) Chris Vermeulen	Kawasaki ZX-10R	22	+46.468	19	
18	15	(Italy) Matteo Baiocco	Kawasaki ZX-10R	22	+57.170	21	
19	95	(United States) Roger Lee Hayden	Kawasaki ZX-10R	22	+1:01.634	22	
20	76	(Germany) Max Neukirchner	Honda CBR1000RR	22	+1:04.295	16	
Ret	23	(Australia) Broc Parkes	Honda CBR1000RR	9	Retirement	20	
Ret	111	(Spain) Rubén Xaus	BMW S1000RR	8	Mechanical	12	
OFFICIAL SUPERBIKE RACE 1 REPORT

=== Superbike race 2 classification ===
Pos	No	Rider	Manufacturer	Laps	Time	Grid	Points
1	65	(United Kingdom) Jonathan Rea	Honda CBR1000RR	22	35:43.137	1	25
2	91	(United Kingdom) Leon Haslam	Suzuki GSX-R1000	22	+1.942	4	20
3	52	(United Kingdom) James Toseland	Yamaha YZF-R1	22	+3.928	10	16
4	3	(Italy) Max Biaggi	Aprilia RSV4 1000 F	22	+4.067	11	13
5	11	(Australia) Troy Corser	BMW S1000RR	22	+4.176	3	11
6	7	(Spain) Carlos Checa	Ducati 1098R	22	+4.525	6	10
7	96	(Czech Republic) Jakub Smrž	Ducati 1098R	22	+4.682	2	9
8	67	(United Kingdom) Shane Byrne	Ducati 1098R	22	+7.698	7	8
9	76	(Germany) Max Neukirchner	Honda CBR1000RR	22	+9.903	16	7
10	111	(Spain) Rubén Xaus	BMW S1000RR	22	+11.465	12	6
11	99	(Italy) Luca Scassa	Ducati 1098R	22	+15.489	17	5
12	84	(Italy) Michel Fabrizio	Ducati 1098R	22	+23.604	8	4
13	50	(France) Sylvain Guintoli	Suzuki GSX-R1000	22	+29.085	13	3
14	77	(Australia) Chris Vermeulen	Kawasaki ZX-10R	22	+35.401	19	2
15	15	(Italy) Matteo Baiocco	Kawasaki ZX-10R	22	+44.330	21	1
16	95	(United States) Roger Lee Hayden	Kawasaki ZX-10R	22	+50.830	22	
17	23	(Australia) Broc Parkes	Honda CBR1000RR	22	+58.819	20	
Ret	2	(United Kingdom) Leon Camier	Aprilia RSV4 1000 F	20	Accident	5	
Ret	35	(United Kingdom) Cal Crutchlow	Yamaha YZF-R1	11	Retirement	9	
Ret	41	(Japan) Noriyuki Haga	Ducati 1098R	6	Retirement	15	
Ret	57	(Italy) Lorenzo Lanzi	Ducati 1098R	0	Accident	18	
Ret	66	(United Kingdom) Tom Sykes	Kawasaki ZX-10R	0	Accident	14	
OFFICIAL SUPERBIKE RACE 2 REPORT

=== Supersport race classification ===
Pos	No	Rider	Manufacturer	Laps	Time	Grid	Points
1	50	(Republic of Ireland) Eugene Laverty	Honda CBR600RR	21	34:45.753	2	25
2	26	(Spain) Joan Lascorz	Kawasaki ZX-6R	21	+2.796	4	20
3	54	(Turkey) Kenan Sofuoğlu	Honda CBR600RR	21	+2.962	1	16
4	7	(United Kingdom) Chaz Davies	Triumph Daytona 675	21	+23.040	9	13
5	14	(France) Matthieu Lagrive	Triumph Daytona 675	21	+26.338	6	11
6	127	(Denmark) Robbin Harms	Honda CBR600RR	21	+32.544	10	10
7	4	(United Kingdom) Gino Rea	Honda CBR600RR	21	+36.591	11	9
8	37	(Japan) Katsuaki Fujiwara	Kawasaki ZX-6R	21	+36.697	7	8
9	55	(Italy) Massimo Roccoli	Honda CBR600RR	21	+36.879	13	7
10	117	(Portugal) Miguel Praia	Honda CBR600RR	21	+47.288	15	6
11	5	(Sweden) Alexander Lundh	Honda CBR600RR	21	+48.168	14	5
12	40	(United States) Jason DiSalvo	Triumph Daytona 675	21	+49.006	12	4
13	9	(Italy) Danilo Dell'Omo	Honda CBR600RR	21	+1:28.408	16	3
14	8	(Switzerland) Bastien Chesaux	Honda CBR600RR	21	+1:36.505	17	2
15	33	(Italy) Paola Cazzola	Honda CBR600RR	20	+1 Lap	18	1
16	10	(Hungary) Imre Tóth	Honda CBR600RR	20	+1 Lap	19	
Ret	99	(France) Fabien Foret	Kawasaki ZX-6R	13	Accident	5	
Ret	25	(Spain) David Salom	Triumph Daytona 675	3	Accident	8	
Ret	51	(Italy) Michele Pirro	Honda CBR600RR	3	Retirement	3	
OFFICIAL SUPERSPORT RACE REPORT

=== Superstock 1000 race classification ===
Pos	No	Rider	Manufacturer	Laps	Time	Grid	Points
1	86	(Italy) Ayrton Badovini	BMW S1000RR	13	21:44.147	3	25
2	21	(France) Maxime Berger	Honda CBR1000RR	13	+2.213	1	20
3	34	(Italy) Davide Giugliano	Suzuki GSX-R1000 K9	13	+4.323	2	16
4	119	(Italy) Michele Magnoni	Honda CBR1000RR	13	+6.977	4	13
5	20	(France) Sylvain Barrier	BMW S1000RR	13	+9.812	5	11
6	8	(Italy) Andrea Antonelli	Honda CBR1000RR	13	+16.667	8	10
7	9	(Italy) Danilo Petrucci	Kawasaki ZX-10R	13	+16.713	6	9
8	7	(Austria) René Mähr	Suzuki GSX-R1000 K9	13	+17.069	10	8
9	14	(Italy) Lorenzo Baroni	Ducati 1098R	13	+17.198	9	7
10	11	(Spain) Pere Tutusaus	KTM 1190 RC8 R	13	+18.927	14	6
11	53	(Germany) Dominic Lammert	BMW S1000RR	13	+27.445	13	5
12	93	(France) Mathieu Lussiana	BMW S1000RR	13	+32.512	19	4
13	134	(Italy) Roberto Lacalendola	Ducati 1098R	13	+32.972	18	3
14	99	(South Africa) Chris Leeson	Kawasaki ZX-10R	13	+44.429	20	2
15	12	(Italy) Nico Vivarelli	KTM 1190 RC8 R	13	+45.317	17	1
16	45	(Norway) Kim Arne Sletten	Yamaha YZF-R1	13	+55.469	24	
17	29	(Italy) Daniele Beretta	BMW S1000RR	13	+55.931	21	
18	55	(Slovakia) Tomáš Svitok	Honda CBR1000RR	13	+56.749	22	
19	91	(Poland) Marcin Walkowiak	Honda CBR1000RR	13	+58.289	25	
20	36	(Brazil) Philippe Thiriet	Honda CBR1000RR	13	+1:00.097	23	
21	89	(Czech Republic) Michal Salač	Aprilia RSV4 1000	13	+1:07.829	26	
Ret	69	(Czech Republic) Ondřej Ježek	Aprilia RSV4 1000	12	Technical	15	
Ret	65	(France) Loris Baz	Yamaha YZF-R1	11	Accident	11	
Ret	30	(Switzerland) Michaël Savary	BMW S1000RR	10	Retirement	16	
Ret	5	(Italy) Marco Bussolotti	Honda CBR1000RR	4	Accident	7	
Ret	47	(Italy) Eddi La Marra	Honda CBR1000RR	4	Accident	12	
DNS	64	(Brazil) Danilo Andric	Honda CBR1000RR		Did not start		
OFFICIAL SUPERSTOCK 1000 RACE REPORT

=== Superstock 600 race classification ===
Pos	No	Rider	Manufacturer	Laps	Time	Grid	Points
1	21	(France) Florian Marino	Honda CBR600RR	10	17:07.536	1	25
2	11	(France) Jérémy Guarnoni	Yamaha YZF-R6	10	+0.154	2	20
3	13	(Italy) Dino Lombardi	Yamaha YZF-R6	10	+7.436	5	16
4	343	(Italy) Federico D'Annunzio	Yamaha YZF-R6	10	+7.709	3	13
5	72	(Norway) Fredrik Karlsen	Yamaha YZF-R6	10	+7.871	6	11
6	6	(France) Romain Lanusse	Yamaha YZF-R6	10	+20.050	8	10
7	99	(Netherlands) Tony Coveña	Yamaha YZF-R6	10	+20.892	15	9
8	69	(France) Nelson Major	Yamaha YZF-R6	10	+21.176	12	8
9	22	(France) Cyril Carrillo	Yamaha YZF-R6	10	+21.194	4	7
10	10	(Spain) Nacho Calero	Yamaha YZF-R6	10	+21.244	7	6
11	52	(Belgium) Gauthier Duwelz	Yamaha YZF-R6	10	+21.563	11	5
12	27	(Italy) Davide Fanelli	Honda CBR600RR	10	+21.696	9	4
13	28	(France) Steven Le Coquen	Yamaha YZF-R6	10	+23.037	17	3
14	9	(United Kingdom) Joshua Elliott	Honda CBR600RR	10	+25.088	13	2
15	19	(Slovakia) Tomáš Krajči	Yamaha YZF-R6	10	+26.109	14	1
16	82	(Czech Republic) Karel Pešek	Yamaha YZF-R6	10	+56.605	16	
DNS	12	(Italy) Riccardo Cecchini	Triumph Daytona 675	0	Did not start	10	
OFFICIAL SUPERSTOCK 600 RACE REPORT
