= 2010 Kyalami Superbike World Championship round =

(South Africa) 2010 Kyalami Superbike World Championship round
Round details
- Round 6 of 13 rounds in the 2010 Superbike World Championship. and Round 6 of 13 rounds in the 2010 Supersport World Championship.
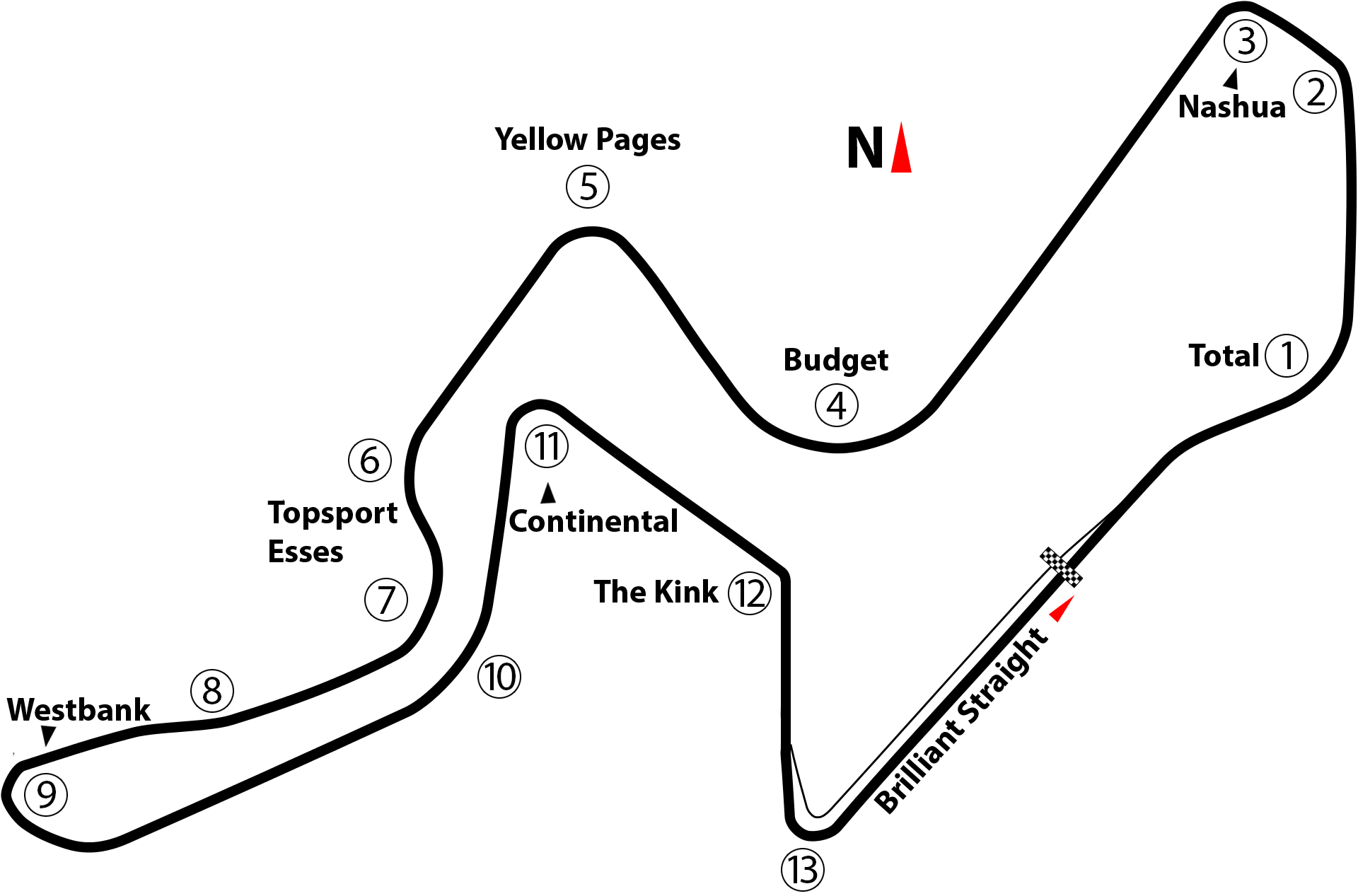
- Date: 16 May, 2010
- Location: Kyalami
- Course: Permanent racing facility 4.261 km (2.648 mi)

Superbike World Championship
Pole position
(United Kingdom) Cal Crutchlow
1:37.243
Fastest lap race 1	Fastest lap race 2
(Italy) Michel Fabrizio	(United Kingdom) Jonathan Rea
1:38.170	1:38.658

Supersport World Championship
Pole position
(Republic of Ireland) Eugene Laverty
1:40.812
Fastest lap
(Turkey) Kenan Sofuoğlu
1:41.054

The 2010 Kyalami Superbike World Championship round was the sixth round of the 2010 Superbike World Championship season. It took place on the weekend of 14–16 May 2010 at Kyalami, South Africa.

== Results ==
=== Superbike race 1 classification ===
Pos	No	Rider	Manufacturer	Laps	Time	Grid	Points
1	84	(Italy) Michel Fabrizio	Ducati 1098R	24	39:48.343	4	25
2	7	(Spain) Carlos Checa	Ducati 1098R	24	+1.098	3	20
3	91	(United Kingdom) Leon Haslam	Suzuki GSX-R1000	24	+5.049	5	16
4	3	(Italy) Max Biaggi	Aprilia RSV4 1000 F	24	+6.974	7	13
5	65	(United Kingdom) Jonathan Rea	Honda CBR1000RR	24	+13.710	11	11
6	2	(United Kingdom) Leon Camier	Aprilia RSV4 1000 F	24	+13.848	8	10
7	52	(United Kingdom) James Toseland	Yamaha YZF-R1	24	+16.064	2	9
8	35	(United Kingdom) Cal Crutchlow	Yamaha YZF-R1	24	+16.231	1	8
9	96	(Czech Republic) Jakub Smrž	Ducati 1098R	24	+16.580	6	7
10	50	(France) Sylvain Guintoli	Suzuki GSX-R1000	24	+23.100	10	6
11	99	(Italy) Luca Scassa	Ducati 1098R	24	+24.561	9	5
12	11	(Australia) Troy Corser	BMW S1000RR	24	+25.504	13	4
13	71	(South Africa) Sheridan Morais	Aprilia RSV4 1000 F	24	+27.073	14	3
14	111	(Spain) Rubén Xaus	BMW S1000RR	24	+27.273	15	2
15	67	(United Kingdom) Shane Byrne	Ducati 1098R	24	+30.692	18	1
16	66	(United Kingdom) Tom Sykes	Kawasaki ZX-10R	24	+34.008	12	
17	41	(Japan) Noriyuki Haga	Ducati 1098R	24	+35.948	16	
18	77	(Australia) Chris Vermeulen	Kawasaki ZX-10R	24	+44.030	19	
19	76	(Germany) Max Neukirchner	Honda CBR1000RR	24	+48.382	17	
Ret	95	(United States) Roger Lee Hayden	Kawasaki ZX-10R	13	Mechanical	21	
Ret	23	(Australia) Broc Parkes	Honda CBR1000RR	11	Accident	20	
Ret	15	(Italy) Matteo Baiocco	Kawasaki ZX-10R	6	Retirement	22	
OFFICIAL SUPERBIKE RACE 1 REPORT

=== Superbike race 2 classification ===
Pos	No	Rider	Manufacturer	Laps	Time	Grid	Points
1	91	(United Kingdom) Leon Haslam	Suzuki GSX-R1000	24	39:52.870	5	25
2	65	(United Kingdom) Jonathan Rea	Honda CBR1000RR	24	+0.522	11	20
3	3	(Italy) Max Biaggi	Aprilia RSV4 1000 F	24	+0.601	7	16
4	35	(United Kingdom) Cal Crutchlow	Yamaha YZF-R1	24	+0.991	1	13
5	7	(Spain) Carlos Checa	Ducati 1098R	24	+1.479	3	11
6	52	(United Kingdom) James Toseland	Yamaha YZF-R1	24	+13.324	2	10
7	11	(Australia) Troy Corser	BMW S1000RR	24	+13.740	13	9
8	84	(Italy) Michel Fabrizio	Ducati 1098R	24	+14.250	4	8
9	96	(Czech Republic) Jakub Smrž	Ducati 1098R	24	+15.190	6	7
10	41	(Japan) Noriyuki Haga	Ducati 1098R	24	+16.790	16	6
11	111	(Spain) Rubén Xaus	BMW S1000RR	24	+21.101	15	5
12	99	(Italy) Luca Scassa	Ducati 1098R	24	+22.670	9	4
13	67	(United Kingdom) Shane Byrne	Ducati 1098R	24	+24.506	18	3
14	66	(United Kingdom) Tom Sykes	Kawasaki ZX-10R	24	+31.301	12	2
15	50	(France) Sylvain Guintoli	Suzuki GSX-R1000	24	+31.836	10	1
16	77	(Australia) Chris Vermeulen	Kawasaki ZX-10R	24	+33.710	19	
17	76	(Germany) Max Neukirchner	Honda CBR1000RR	24	+35.203	17	
18	23	(Australia) Broc Parkes	Honda CBR1000RR	24	+55.929	20	
19	95	(United States) Roger Lee Hayden	Kawasaki ZX-10R	24	+56.074	21	
20	15	(Italy) Matteo Baiocco	Kawasaki ZX-10R	24	+1:08.481	22	
Ret	2	(United Kingdom) Leon Camier	Aprilia RSV4 1000 F	17	Retirement	8	
Ret	71	(South Africa) Sheridan Morais	Aprilia RSV4 1000 F	10	Accident	14	
OFFICIAL SUPERBIKE RACE 2 REPORT

=== Supersport race classification ===
Pos	No	Rider	Manufacturer	Laps	Time	Grid	Points
1	50	(Republic of Ireland) Eugene Laverty	Honda CBR600RR	23	39:13.215	1	25
2	54	(Turkey) Kenan Sofuoğlu	Honda CBR600RR	23	+4.184	2	20
3	7	(United Kingdom) Chaz Davies	Triumph Daytona 675	23	+9.609	6	16
4	51	(Italy) Michele Pirro	Honda CBR600RR	23	+12.912	3	13
5	26	(Spain) Joan Lascorz	Kawasaki ZX-6R	23	+23.383	8	11
6	14	(France) Matthieu Lagrive	Triumph Daytona 675	23	+25.252	5	10
7	25	(Spain) David Salom	Triumph Daytona 675	23	+25.315	9	9
8	127	(Denmark) Robbin Harms	Honda CBR600RR	23	+27.087	10	8
9	4	(United Kingdom) Gino Rea	Honda CBR600RR	23	+32.358	12	7
10	117	(Portugal) Miguel Praia	Honda CBR600RR	23	+32.476	15	6
11	38	(South Africa) Lance Isaacs	Honda CBR600RR	23	+35.347	11	5
12	37	(Japan) Katsuaki Fujiwara	Kawasaki ZX-6R	23	+36.882	4	4
13	5	(Sweden) Alexander Lundh	Honda CBR600RR	23	+48.961	18	3
14	8	(Switzerland) Bastien Chesaux	Honda CBR600RR	23	+1:06.978	16	2
15	19	(Italy) Andrea Boscoscuro	Honda CBR600RR	23	+1:29.261	17	1
Ret	9	(Italy) Danilo Dell'Omo	Honda CBR600RR	21	Retirement	19	
Ret	40	(United States) Jason DiSalvo	Triumph Daytona 675	20	Mechanical	14	
Ret	55	(Italy) Massimo Roccoli	Honda CBR600RR	13	Accident	7	
Ret	99	(France) Fabien Foret	Kawasaki ZX-6R	9	Accident	13	
Ret	43	(South Africa) Jacques Peskens	Honda CBR600RR	9	Retirement	20	
DNS	34	(South Africa) Ronan Quarmby	Honda CBR600RR		Injury		
OFFICIAL SUPERSPORT RACE REPORT
