= 2010 Magny-Cours Superbike World Championship round =

(France) 2010 Magny-Cours Superbike World Championship round
Round details
- Round 13 of 13 rounds in the 2010 Superbike World Championship. and Round 13 of 13 rounds in the 2010 Supersport World Championship.
- Date: October 3, 2010
- Location: Circuit de Nevers Magny-Cours
- Course: Permanent racing facility 4.411 km (2.741 mi)

Superbike World Championship
Pole position
(United Kingdom) Cal Crutchlow
1:37.699
Fastest lap race 1	Fastest lap race 2
(United Kingdom) Cal Crutchlow	(United Kingdom) Cal Crutchlow
1:38.781	1:38.879

Supersport World Championship
Pole position
(Turkey) Kenan Sofuoglu
1:41.372
Fastest lap
(Republic of Ireland) Eugene Laverty
1:42.295

The 2010 Magny-Cours Superbike World Championship round was the last round of the 2010 Superbike World Championship season. It took place on the weekend of October 1-3, 2010 at the Circuit de Nevers Magny-Cours.

== Results ==
=== Superbike race 1 classification ===
Sylvain Guintoli was disqualified for ignoring a ride through penalty.

Pos	No	Rider	Bike	Laps	Time	Grid	Points
1	35	(United Kingdom) Cal Crutchlow	Yamaha YZF R1	23	38:15.586	1	25
2	91	(United Kingdom) Leon Haslam	Suzuki GSX-R1000	23	+3.779	10	20
3	7	(Spain) Carlos Checa	Ducati 1098R	23	+4.261	7	16
4	3	(Italy) Max Biaggi	Aprilia RSV4 1000 F	23	+4.416	4	13
5	96	(Czech Republic) Jakub Smrz	Aprilia RSV4 1000 F	23	+7.476	3	11
6	84	(Italy) Michel Fabrizio	Ducati 1098R	23	+11.866	5	10
7	41	(Japan) Noriyuki Haga	Ducati 1098R	23	+16.390	8	9
8	66	(United Kingdom) Tom Sykes	Kawasaki ZX 10R	23	+21.669	12	8
9	67	(United Kingdom) Shane Byrne	Ducati 1098R	23	+22.065	14	7
10	99	(Italy) Luca Scassa	Ducati 1098R	23	+22.281	16	6
11	57	(Italy) Lorenzo Lanzi	Ducati 1098R	23	+26.748	13	5
12	65	(United Kingdom) Jonathan Rea	Honda CBR1000RR	23	+35.608	6	4
13	76	(Germany) Max Neukirchner	Honda CBR1000RR	23	+39.929	17	3
14	5	(United Kingdom) Ian Lowry	Kawasaki ZX 10R	23	+54.836	18	2
15	15	(Italy) Matteo Baiocco	Kawasaki ZX 10R	23	+1:07.191	19	1
16	33	(Italy) Fabrizio Lai	Honda CBR1000RR	23	+1:14.632	20	
Ret	95	(United States) Roger Lee Hayden	Kawasaki ZX 10R	20	Retirement	21	
Ret	11	(Australia) Troy Corser	BMW S1000RR	7	Mechanical	9	
Ret	52	(United Kingdom) James Toseland	Yamaha YZF R1	3	Accident	15	
Ret	111	(Spain) Ruben Xaus	BMW S1000RR	2	Accident	11	
DSQ	50	(France) Sylvain Guintoli	Suzuki GSX-R1000		Disqualified	2	

=== Superbike race 2 classification ===
Pos	No	Rider	Bike	Laps	Time	Grid	Points
1	3	(Italy) Max Biaggi	Aprilia RSV4 1000 F	23	38:11.343	4	25
2	35	(United Kingdom) Cal Crutchlow	Yamaha YZF R1	23	+0.087	1	20
3	84	(Italy) Michel Fabrizio	Ducati 1098R	23	+3.715	5	16
4	50	(France) Sylvain Guintoli	Suzuki GSX-R1000	23	+4.004	2	13
5	41	(Japan) Noriyuki Haga	Ducati 1098R	23	+15.471	8	11
6	96	(Czech Republic) Jakub Smrz	Aprilia RSV4 1000 F	23	+18.378	3	10
7	99	(Italy) Luca Scassa	Ducati 1098R	23	+21.180	16	9
8	67	(United Kingdom) Shane Byrne	Ducati 1098R	23	+23.055	14	8
9	7	(Spain) Carlos Checa	Ducati 1098R	23	+25.657	7	7
10	91	(United Kingdom) Leon Haslam	Suzuki GSX-R1000	23	+27.781	10	6
11	66	(United Kingdom) Tom Sykes	Kawasaki ZX 10R	23	+28.206	12	5
12	76	(Germany) Max Neukirchner	Honda CBR1000RR	23	+44.634	17	4
13	5	(United Kingdom) Ian Lowry	Kawasaki ZX 10R	23	+1:04.181	18	3
14	15	(Italy) Matteo Baiocco	Kawasaki ZX 10R	23	+1:16.446	19	2
Ret	57	(Italy) Lorenzo Lanzi	Ducati 1098R	17	Accident	13	
Ret	95	(United States) Roger Lee Hayden	Kawasaki ZX 10R	9	Retirement	21	
Ret	52	(United Kingdom) James Toseland	Yamaha YZF R1	4	Accident	15	
Ret	11	(Australia) Troy Corser	BMW S1000RR	4	Retirement	9	
Ret	33	(Italy) Fabrizio Lai	Honda CBR1000RR	4	Retirement	20	
DNS	65	(United Kingdom) Jonathan Rea	Honda CBR1000RR		Did not start	6	
DNS	111	(Spain) Ruben Xaus	BMW S1000RR		Did not start	11	

=== Supersport race classification ===
Pos	No	Rider	Bike	Laps	Time	Grid	Points
1	50	(Republic of Ireland) Eugene Laverty	Honda CBR600RR	22	37:46.575	2	25
2	54	(Turkey) Kenan Sofuoglu	Honda CBR600RR	22	+4.769	1	20
3	7	(United Kingdom) Chaz Davies	Triumph Daytona 675	22	+17.658	12	16
4	55	(Italy) Massimo Roccoli	Honda CBR600RR	22	+20.412	8	13
5	127	(Denmark) Robbin Harms	Honda CBR600RR	22	+20.559	11	11
6	37	(Japan) Katsuaki Fujiwara	Kawasaki ZX-6R	22	+21.200	3	10
7	25	(Spain) David Salom	Triumph Daytona 675	22	+25.051	6	9
8	51	(Italy) Michele Pirro	Honda CBR600RR	22	+25.174	7	8
9	44	(Italy) Roberto Tamburini	Yamaha YZF R6	22	+32.256	14	7
10	117	(Portugal) Miguel Praia	Honda CBR600RR	22	+59.797	17	6
11	89	(France) Axel Maurin	Yamaha YZF R6	22	+1:04.127	18	5
12	121	(France) Florian Marino	Honda CBR600RR	22	+1:23.612	13	4
Ret	4	(United Kingdom) Gino Rea	Honda CBR600RR	11	Mechanical	9	
Ret	18	(Australia) Mark Aitchison	Honda CBR600RR	11	Accident	10	
Ret	5	(Sweden) Alexander Lundh	Honda CBR600RR	8	Retirement	19	
Ret	23	(Australia) Broc Parkes	Kawasaki ZX-6R	7	Retirement	5	
Ret	99	(France) Fabien Foret	Kawasaki ZX-6R	6	Retirement	4	
Ret	10	(Hungary) Imre Toth	Honda CBR600RR	5	Retirement	20	
Ret	69	(France) Julien Enjolras	Triumph Daytona 675	5	Retirement	16	
Ret	31	(Italy) Vittorio Iannuzzo	Triumph Daytona 675	4	Retirement	15	

=== Superstock 1000 race classification ===
Pos	No	Rider	Manufacturer	Laps	Time	Grid	Points
1	21	(France) Maxime Berger	Honda CBR1000RR	14	23:52.988	1	25
2	86	(Italy) Ayrton Badovini	BMW S1000RR	14	+4.722	3	20
3	20	(France) Sylvain Barrier	BMW S1000RR	14	+10.258	2	16
4	87	(Italy) Lorenzo Zanetti	Ducati 1098R	14	+15.130	9	13
5	14	(Italy) Lorenzo Zanetti	Ducati 1098R	14	+25.214	7	11
6	34	(Italy) Davide Giugliano	Suzuki GSX-R1000 K9	14	+29.120	4	10
7	8	(Italy) Andrea Antonelli	Honda CBR1000RR	14	+29.780	10	9
8	9	(Italy) Danilo Petrucci	Kawasaki ZX-10R	14	+29.879	8	8
9	47	(Italy) Eddi La Marra	Honda CBR1000RR	14	+30.152	12	7
10	25	(France) Julien Millet	BMW S1000RR	14	+31.140	6	6
11	30	(Switzerland) Michaël Savary	BMW S1000RR	14	+31.358	14	5
12	119	(Italy) Michele Magnoni	Honda CBR1000RR	14	+35.614	11	4
13	11	(Spain) Pere Tutusaus	KTM 1190 RC8 R	14	+43.226	17	3
14	93	(France) Mathieu Lussiana	BMW S1000RR	14	+44.369	16	2
15	29	(Italy) Daniele Beretta	BMW S1000RR	14	+45.359	15	1
16	69	(Czech Republic) Ondřej Ježek	Aprilia RSV4 1000	14	+46.029	18	
17	39	(France) Randy Pagaud	BMW S1000RR	14	+54.172	19	
18	99	(South Africa) Chris Leeson	Kawasaki ZX-10R	14	+55.905	23	
19	55	(Slovakia) Tomáš Svitok	Honda CBR1000RR	14	+1:00.806	21	
20	64	(Brazil) Danilo Andric	Honda CBR1000RR	14	+1:10.502	22	
21	45	(Norway) Kim Arne Sletten	Yamaha YZF-R1	14	+1:15.927	25	
22	91	(Poland) Marcin Walkowiak	Honda CBR1000RR	14	+1:16.222	26	
23	36	(Brazil) Philippe Thiriet	Honda CBR1000RR	14	+1:23.839	27	
24	89	(Czech Republic) Michal Salač	Aprilia RSV4 1000	14	+1:27.739	28	
Ret	72	(Norway) Frederik Karlsen	Yamaha YZF-R1	7	Accident	24	
Ret	12	(Italy) Nico Vivarelli	KTM 1190 RC8 R	5	Retirement	20	
Ret	65	(France) Loris Baz	Yamaha YZF-R1	2	Accident	5	
DNS	46	(United Kingdom) Tommy Bridewell	Honda CBR1000RR	0	Did not start	13	

=== Superstock 600 race classification ===
Pos	No	Rider	Manufacturer	Laps	Time	Grid	Points
1	3	(Australia) Jed Metcher	Yamaha YZF-R6	10	17:35.250	7	25
2	13	(Italy) Dino Lombardi	Yamaha YZF-R6	10	+5.913	4	20
3	99	(Netherlands) Tony Coveña	Yamaha YZF-R6	10	+12.227	12	16
4	9	(United Kingdom) Joshua Elliott	Kawasaki ZX-6R	10	+13.236	8	13
5	52	(Belgium) Gauthier Duwelz	Yamaha YZF-R6	10	+14.396	15	11
6	343	(Italy) Federico D'Annunzio	Yamaha YZF-R6	10	+15.279	9	10
7	121	(Netherlands) Michael Van Der Mark	Honda CBR600RR	10	+15.492	11	9
8	10	(Spain) Nacho Calero	Yamaha YZF-R6	10	+22.174	10	8
9	75	(Italy) Francesco Cocco	Yamaha YZF-R6	10	+30.433	16	7
10	34	(Netherlands) Kevin Van Leuven	Yamaha YZF-R6	10	+31.007	19	6
11	19	(Slovakia) Tomáš Krajči	Yamaha YZF-R6	10	+31.736	18	5
12	23	(Italy) Luca Salvadori	Yamaha YZF-R6	10	+32.831	17	4
13	71	(Italy) Clive Rambure	Yamaha YZF-R6	10	+33.104	14	3
14	70	(France) Clément Chevrier	Honda CBR600RR	10	+33.228	20	2
15	26	(Romania) Mircea Vrajitoru	Yamaha YZF-R6	10	+40.401	23	1
16	49	(France) Morgan Esnault	Yamaha YZF-R6	10	+40.768	22	
17	7	(France) Jonathan Martinez	Honda CBR600RR	10	+41.948	21	
18	69	(France) Nelson Major	Yamaha YZF-R6	10	+42.221	13	
19	27	(Italy) Davide Fanelli	Honda CBR600RR	10	+1:08.778	5	
Ret	11	(France) Jérémy Guarnoni	Yamaha YZF-R6	8	Accident	1	
Ret	43	(France) Stéphane Egea	Yamaha YZF-R6	8	Accident	3	
Ret	28	(France) Steven Le Coquen	Yamaha YZF-R6	0	Accident	6	
Ret	6	(France) Romain Lanusse	Yamaha YZF-R6	0	Accident	2	
