= 2010 Miller Superbike World Championship round =

(United States) 2010 Miller Superbike World Championship round
Round details
- Round 7 of 13 rounds in the 2010 Superbike World Championship. and Round 7 of 13 rounds in the 2010 Supersport World Championship.
- Date: May 31, 2010
- Location: Miller Motorsports Park
- Course: Permanent racing facility 4.876 km (3.030 mi)

Superbike World Championship
Pole position
(Spain) Carlos Checa
1:47.081
Fastest lap race 1	Fastest lap race 2
(Spain) Carlos Checa	(Spain) Carlos Checa
1:48.045	1:48.148

Supersport World Championship
Pole position
(Turkey) Kenan Sofuoğlu
1:51.281
Fastest lap
(Turkey) Kenan Sofuoğlu
1:51.702

The 2010 Miller Superbike World Championship round was the seventh round of the 2010 Superbike World Championship season. It took place on the weekend of May 29–31, 2010 at Miller Motorsports Park, in Tooele, Utah, United States.

== Results ==
=== Superbike race 1 classification ===
Pos	No	Rider	Manufacturer	Laps	Time	Grid	Points
1	3	(Italy) Max Biaggi	Aprilia RSV4 1000 F	24	38:20.442	2	25
2	91	(United Kingdom) Leon Haslam	Suzuki GSX-R1000	21	+4.931	5	20
3	41	(Japan) Noriyuki Haga	Ducati 1098R	21	+6.432	6	16
4	2	(United Kingdom) Leon Camier	Aprilia RSV4 1000 F	21	+8.576	8	13
5	11	(Australia) Troy Corser	BMW S1000RR	21	+11.150	15	11
6	67	(United Kingdom) Shane Byrne	Ducati 1098R	21	+11.243	11	10
7	99	(Italy) Luca Scassa	Ducati 1098R	21	+12.432	13	9
8	50	(France) Sylvain Guintoli	Suzuki GSX-R1000	21	+15.145	12	8
9	52	(United Kingdom) James Toseland	Yamaha YZF-R1	21	+16.091	14	7
10	111	(Spain) Rubén Xaus	BMW S1000RR	21	+16.502	9	6
11	35	(United Kingdom) Cal Crutchlow	Yamaha YZF-R1	21	+18.719	3	5
12	76	(Germany) Max Neukirchner	Honda CBR1000RR	21	+24.285	16	4
13	66	(United Kingdom) Tom Sykes	Kawasaki ZX-10R	21	+36.479	18	3
14	65	(United Kingdom) Jonathan Rea	Honda CBR1000RR	21	+39.700	7	2
15	77	(Australia) Chris Vermeulen	Kawasaki ZX-10R	21	+41.253	17	1
16	95	(United States) Roger Lee Hayden	Kawasaki ZX-10R	21	+41.661	20	
17	23	(Australia) Broc Parkes	Honda CBR1000RR	21	+1:00.427	19	
18	15	(Italy) Matteo Baiocco	Kawasaki ZX-10R	17	+4 Laps	21	
Ret	7	(Spain) Carlos Checa	Ducati 1098R	18	Mechanical	1	
Ret	84	(Italy) Michel Fabrizio	Ducati 1098R	1	Accident	10	
Ret	96	(Czech Republic) Jakub Smrž	Ducati 1098R	0	Mechanical	4	
OFFICIAL SUPERBIKE RACE 1 REPORT

=== Superbike race 2 classification ===
Pos	No	Rider	Manufacturer	Laps	Time	Grid	Points
1	3	(Italy) Max Biaggi	Aprilia RSV4 1000 F	21	38:17.842	2	25
2	2	(United Kingdom) Leon Camier	Aprilia RSV4 1000 F	21	+5.899	8	20
3	35	(United Kingdom) Cal Crutchlow	Yamaha YZF-R1	21	+7.363	3	16
4	41	(Japan) Noriyuki Haga	Ducati 1098R	21	+8.842	6	13
5	11	(Australia) Troy Corser	BMW S1000RR	21	+9.473	15	11
6	50	(France) Sylvain Guintoli	Suzuki GSX-R1000	21	+12.293	12	10
7	67	(United Kingdom) Shane Byrne	Ducati 1098R	21	+12.483	11	9
8	65	(United Kingdom) Jonathan Rea	Honda CBR1000RR	21	+15.959	7	8
9	84	(Italy) Michel Fabrizio	Ducati 1098R	21	+18.897	10	7
10	99	(Italy) Luca Scassa	Ducati 1098R	21	+20.372	13	6
11	111	(Spain) Rubén Xaus	BMW S1000RR	21	+26.823	9	5
12	76	(Germany) Max Neukirchner	Honda CBR1000RR	21	+30.344	16	4
13	77	(Australia) Chris Vermeulen	Kawasaki ZX-10R	21	+33.337	17	3
14	66	(United Kingdom) Tom Sykes	Kawasaki ZX-10R	21	+38.772	18	2
15	23	(Australia) Broc Parkes	Honda CBR1000RR	21	+44.994	19	1
Ret	96	(Czech Republic) Jakub Smrž	Ducati 1098R	18	Mechanical	4	
Ret	15	(Italy) Matteo Baiocco	Kawasaki ZX-10R	15	Retirement	21	
Ret	52	(United Kingdom) James Toseland	Yamaha YZF-R1	15	Accident	21	
Ret	95	(United States) Roger Lee Hayden	Kawasaki ZX-10R	12	Retirement	20	
Ret	91	(United Kingdom) Leon Haslam	Suzuki GSX-R1000	7	Accident	5	
Ret	7	(Spain) Carlos Checa	Ducati 1098R	7	Mechanical	1	
OFFICIAL SUPERBIKE RACE 2 REPORT

=== Supersport race classification ===
Pos	No	Rider	Manufacturer	Laps	Time	Grid	Points
1	54	(Turkey) Kenan Sofuoğlu	Honda CBR600RR	18	33:45.278	1	25
2	50	(Republic of Ireland) Eugene Laverty	Honda CBR600RR	18	+1.028	2	20
3	26	(Spain) Joan Lascorz	Kawasaki ZX-6R	18	+1.673	3	16
4	7	(United Kingdom) Chaz Davies	Triumph Daytona 675	18	+13.209	6	13
5	51	(Italy) Michele Pirro	Honda CBR600RR	18	+14.209	7	11
6	37	(Japan) Katsuaki Fujiwara	Kawasaki ZX-6R	18	+14.386	4	10
7	25	(Spain) David Salom	Triumph Daytona 675	18	+14.603	5	9
8	127	(Denmark) Robbin Harms	Honda CBR600RR	18	+20.582	9	8
9	4	(United Kingdom) Gino Rea	Honda CBR600RR	18	+22.895	11	7
10	99	(France) Fabien Foret	Kawasaki ZX-6R	18	+27.100	8	6
11	40	(United States) Jason DiSalvo	Triumph Daytona 675	18	+27.211	10	5
12	14	(France) Matthieu Lagrive	Triumph Daytona 675	18	+28.293	12	4
13	55	(Italy) Massimo Roccoli	Honda CBR600RR	18	+28.393	13	3
14	117	(Portugal) Miguel Praia	Honda CBR600RR	18	+41.986	14	2
15	5	(Sweden) Alexander Lundh	Honda CBR600RR	18	+48.402	15	1
16	46	(United States) Tyler Odom	Honda CBR600RR	18	+48.689	16	
17	8	(Switzerland) Bastien Chesaux	Honda CBR600RR	18	+1:12.283	17	
18	86	(United States) Jason Farrell	Kawasaki ZX-6R	18	+1:56.115	18	
Ret	13	(United States) Melissa Paris	Yamaha YZF-R1	6	Accident	19	
OFFICIAL SUPERSPORT RACE REPORT
