= 2010 Portimão Superbike World Championship round =

(Portugal) 2010 Portimão Superbike World Championship round
Round details
- Round 2 of 13 rounds in the 2010 Superbike World Championship. and Round 2 of 13 rounds in the 2010 Supersport World Championship.
- Date: March 28, 2010
- Location: Portimão
- Course: Permanent racing facility 4.592 km (2.853 mi)

Superbike World Championship
Pole position
(United Kingdom) Cal Crutchlow
1:42.092
Fastest lap race 1	Fastest lap race 2
(Italy) Max Biaggi	(Spain) Carlos Checa
1:42.774	1:43.285

Supersport World Championship
Pole position
(Republic of Ireland) Eugene Laverty
1:45.169
Fastest lap
(Italy) Michele Pirro
1:45.180

The 2010 Portimão Superbike World Championship round was the second round of the 2010 Superbike World Championship. It took place on the weekend of March 26–28, 2010 at the Autódromo Internacional do Algarve.

== Results ==
=== Superbike race 1 classification ===
Pos	No	Rider	Manufacturer	Laps	Time	Grid	Points
1	3	(Italy) Max Biaggi	Aprilia RSV4 1000 F	22	37:59.283	2	25
2	91	(United Kingdom) Leon Haslam	Suzuki GSX-R1000	22	+0.200	4	20
3	65	(United Kingdom) Jonathan Rea	Honda CBR1000RR	22	+6.901	5	16
4	7	(Spain) Carlos Checa	Ducati 1098R	22	+7.457	3	13
5	2	(United Kingdom) Leon Camier	Aprilia RSV4 1000 F	22	+7.564	11	11
6	67	(United Kingdom) Shane Byrne	Ducati 1098R	22	+11.420	7	10
7	52	(United Kingdom) James Toseland	Yamaha YZF-R1	22	+18.391	15	9
8	41	(Japan) Noriyuki Haga	Ducati 1098R	22	+18.536	18	8
9	11	(Australia) Troy Corser	BMW S1000RR	22	+24.514	8	7
10	111	(Spain) Rubén Xaus	BMW S1000RR	22	+32.427	10	6
11	84	(Italy) Michel Fabrizio	Ducati 1098R	22	+35.045	17	5
12	57	(Italy) Lorenzo Lanzi	Ducati 1098R	22	+36.816	14	4
13	50	(France) Sylvain Guintoli	Suzuki GSX-R1000	22	+36.841	9	3
14	35	(United Kingdom) Cal Crutchlow	Yamaha YZF-R1	22	+44.678	1	2
15	66	(United Kingdom) Tom Sykes	Kawasaki ZX-10R	22	+44.942	12	1
16	31	(Italy) Vittorio Iannuzzo	Honda CBR1000RR	22	+59.135	23	
17	32	(South Africa) Sheridan Morais	Honda CBR1000RR	22	+59.852	21	
18	95	(United States) Roger Lee Hayden	Kawasaki ZX-10R	22	+1:00.097	24	
19	15	(Italy) Matteo Baiocco	Kawasaki ZX-10R	22	+1:10.151	22	
20	99	(Italy) Luca Scassa	Ducati 1098R	16	+6 Laps	16	
Ret	88	(Australia) Andrew Pitt	BMW S1000RR	18	Accident	19	
Ret	96	(Czech Republic) Jakub Smrž	Ducati 1098R	16	Mechanical	6	
Ret	49	(Japan) Makoto Tamada	BMW S1000RR	4	Retirement	20	
Ret	76	(Germany) Max Neukirchner	Honda CBR1000RR	3	Retirement	13	
OFFICIAL SUPERBIKE RACE 1 REPORT

=== Superbike race 2 classification ===
Pos	No	Rider	Manufacturer	Laps	Time	Grid	Points
1	3	(Italy) Max Biaggi	Aprilia RSV4 1000 F	22	38:06.128	2	25
2	91	(United Kingdom) Leon Haslam	Suzuki GSX-R1000	22	+0.191	4	20
3	35	(United Kingdom) Cal Crutchlow	Yamaha YZF-R1	22	+0.658	1	16
4	7	(Spain) Carlos Checa	Ducati 1098R	22	+1.015	3	13
5	2	(United Kingdom) Leon Camier	Aprilia RSV4 1000 F	22	+3.123	11	11
6	52	(United Kingdom) James Toseland	Yamaha YZF-R1	22	+9.131	15	10
7	67	(United Kingdom) Shane Byrne	Ducati 1098R	22	+11.033	7	9
8	41	(Japan) Noriyuki Haga	Ducati 1098R	22	+13.452	18	8
9	50	(France) Sylvain Guintoli	Suzuki GSX-R1000	22	+13.964	9	7
10	11	(Australia) Troy Corser	BMW S1000RR	22	+16.377	8	6
11	84	(Italy) Michel Fabrizio	Ducati 1098R	22	+26.351	17	5
12	111	(Spain) Rubén Xaus	BMW S1000RR	22	+27.964	10	4
13	66	(United Kingdom) Tom Sykes	Kawasaki ZX-10R	22	+33.566	12	3
14	57	(Italy) Lorenzo Lanzi	Ducati 1098R	22	+33.823	14	2
15	76	(Germany) Max Neukirchner	Honda CBR1000RR	22	+37.372	13	1
16	99	(Italy) Luca Scassa	Ducati 1098R	22	+45.611	16	
17	95	(United States) Roger Lee Hayden	Kawasaki ZX-10R	22	+56.512	24	
18	15	(Italy) Matteo Baiocco	Kawasaki ZX-10R	22	+58.980	22	
19	49	(Japan) Makoto Tamada	BMW S1000RR	22	+1:15.819	20	
20	88	(Australia) Andrew Pitt	BMW S1000RR	22	+1:41.672	19	
Ret	32	(South Africa) Sheridan Morais	Honda CBR1000RR	12	Accident	21	
Ret	96	(Czech Republic) Jakub Smrž	Ducati 1098R	10	Accident	6	
Ret	65	(United Kingdom) Jonathan Rea	Honda CBR1000RR	7	Mechanical	5	
Ret	31	(Italy) Vittorio Iannuzzo	Honda CBR1000RR	7	Retirement	23	
OFFICIAL SUPERBIKE RACE 2 REPORT

=== Supersport race classification ===
Pos	No	Rider	Manufacturer	Laps	Time	Grid	Points
1	54	(Turkey) Kenan Sofuoğlu	Honda CBR600RR	20	35:21.143	2	25
2	26	(Spain) Joan Lascorz	Kawasaki ZX-6R	20	+0.031	4	20
3	51	(Italy) Michele Pirro	Honda CBR600RR	20	+8.879	3	16
4	7	(United Kingdom) Chaz Davies	Triumph Daytona 675	20	+15.270	6	13
5	99	(France) Fabien Foret	Kawasaki ZX-6R	20	+22.096	5	11
6	37	(Japan) Katsuaki Fujiwara	Kawasaki ZX-6R	20	+23.041	7	10
7	127	(Denmark) Robbin Harms	Honda CBR600RR	20	+30.830	13	9
8	4	(United Kingdom) Gino Rea	Honda CBR600RR	20	+35.171	12	8
9	55	(Italy) Massimo Roccoli	Honda CBR600RR	20	+35.225	14	7
10	25	(Spain) David Salom	Triumph Daytona 675	20	+35.239	9	6
11	50	(Republic of Ireland) Eugene Laverty	Honda CBR600RR	20	+49.540	1	5
12	40	(United States) Jason DiSalvo	Triumph Daytona 675	20	+49.628	10	4
13	5	(Sweden) Alexander Lundh	Honda CBR600RR	20	+1:08.602	15	3
14	8	(Switzerland) Bastien Chesaux	Honda CBR600RR	20	+1:13.455	16	2
15	9	(Italy) Danilo Dell'Omo	Honda CBR600RR	20	+1:30.738	17	1
16	33	(Italy) Paola Cazzola	Honda CBR600RR	20	+1:30.852	18	
17	36	(United Kingdom) Max Hunt	Yamaha YZF R6	19	+1 Lap	19	
18	24	(Russia) Eduard Blokhin	Yamaha YZF R6	19	+1 Lap	20	
Ret	117	(Portugal) Miguel Praia	Honda CBR600RR	16	Retirement	8	
Ret	14	(France) Matthieu Lagrive	Triumph Daytona 675	0	Accident	11	
OFFICIAL SUPERSPORT RACE REPORT

=== Superstock 1000 race classification ===
Pos	No	Rider	Manufacturer	Laps	Time	Grid	Points
1	86	(Italy) Ayrton Badovini	BMW S1000RR	12	21:18.245	1	25
2	21	(France) Maxime Berger	Honda CBR1000RR	12	+2.744	2	20
3	65	(France) Loris Baz	Yamaha YZF-R1	12	+13.154	5	16
4	20	(France) Sylvain Barrier	Honda CBR1000RR	12	+13.800	9	13
5	5	(Italy) Marco Bussolotti	Honda CBR1000RR	12	+15.304	3	11
6	47	(Italy) Eddi La Marra	Honda CBR1000RR	12	+15.861	4	10
7	34	(Italy) Davide Giugliano	Suzuki GSX-R1000 K9	12	+16.727	11	9
8	8	(Italy) Andrea Antonelli	Honda CBR1000RR	12	+17.334	7	8
9	9	(Italy) Danilo Petrucci	Kawasaki ZX-10R	12	+20.558	12	7
10	30	(Switzerland) Michaël Savary	BMW S1000RR	12	+22.386	14	6
11	11	(Spain) Pere Tutusaus	KTM 1190 RC8 R	12	+23.129	13	5
12	69	(Czech Republic) Ondřej Ježek	Aprilia RSV4 1000	12	+29.915	19	4
13	91	(Poland) Marcin Walkowiak	Honda CBR1000RR	12	+37.183	18	3
14	12	(Italy) Nico Vivarelli	KTM 1190 RC8 R	12	+38.271	17	2
15	119	(Italy) Michele Magnoni	Honda CBR1000RR	12	+38.561	6	1
16	99	(South Africa) Chris Leeson	Kawasaki ZX-10R	12	+44.991	20	
17	64	(Brazil) Danilo Andric	Honda CBR1000RR	12	+47.171	23	
18	36	(Brazil) Philippe Thiriet	Honda CBR1000RR	12	+52.936	22	
19	155	(Portugal) Tiago Dias	GSX-R1000 K9	12	+53.919	26	
20	89	(Czech Republic) Michal Salač	Aprilia RSV4 1000	12	+55.497	25	
21	55	(Slovakia) Tomáš Svitok	Honda CBR1000RR	12	+55.558	24	
22	45	(Norway) Kim Arne Sletten	Yamaha YZF-R1	12	+56.869	28	
23	66	(Poland) Mateusz Stoklosa	BMW S1000RR	12	+1:19.684	27	
Ret	93	(France) Mathieu Lussiana	BMW S1000RR	7	Accident	15	
Ret	14	(Italy) Lorenzo Baroni	Ducati 1098R	4	Accident	8	
Ret	7	(Austria) René Mähr	Suzuki GSX-R1000 K9	4	Accident	10	
Ret	134	(Italy) Roberto Lacalendola	Ducati 1098R	4	Accident	21	
Ret	29	(Italy) Daniele Beretta	BMW S1000RR	0	Accident	16	
WD	37	(Poland) Andrzej Chmielewski	Yamaha YZF-R1		Withdrew		
WD	53	(Germany) Dominic Lammert	BMW S1000RR		Withdrew		
OFFICIAL SUPERSTOCK 1000 RACE REPORT

=== Superstock 600 race classification ===
Pos	No	Rider	Manufacturer	Laps	Time	Grid	Points
1	11	(France) Jérémy Guarnoni	Yamaha YZF-R6	10	18:18.901	2	25
2	6	(France) Romain Lanusse	Yamaha YZF-R6	10	+6.101	7	20
3	72	(Norway) Fredrik Karlsen	Yamaha YZF-R6	10	+6.277	3	16
4	10	(Spain) Nacho Calero	Yamaha YZF-R6	10	+6.527	6	13
5	27	(Italy) Davide Fanelli	Honda CBR600RR	10	+7.916	5	11
6	12	(Italy) Riccardo Cecchini	Triumph Daytona 675	10	+10.090	11	10
7	13	(Italy) Dino Lombardi	Yamaha YZF-R6	10	+10.724	4	9
8	69	(France) Nelson Major	Yamaha YZF-R6	10	+14.105	8	8
9	343	(Italy) Federico D'Annunzio	Yamaha YZF-R6	10	+14.785	10	7
10	17	(Portugal) André Carvalho	Yamaha YZF-R6	10	+16.906	12	6
11	22	(France) Cyril Carrillo	Yamaha YZF-R6	10	+20.819	13	5
12	9	(United Kingdom) Joshua Elliott	Honda CBR600RR	10	+23.043	14	4
13	52	(Belgium) Gauthier Duwelz	Yamaha YZF-R6	10	+25.654	9	3
14	26	(Romania) Mircea Vrajitoru	Yamaha YZF-R6	10	+45.359	15	2
15	28	(France) Steven Le Coquen	Yamaha YZF-R6	10	+59.563	16	1
Ret	21	(France) Florian Marino	Honda CBR600RR	6	Retirement	1	
DNS	99	(Netherlands) Tony Coveña	Yamaha YZF-R6		Did not start		
OFFICIAL SUPERSTOCK 600 RACE REPORT
