= 2010 FIM Superstock 1000 Cup =

2010 FIM Superstock 1000 Cup
Previous:	2009	Next:	2011
Support series: Superbike World Championship; Supersport World Championship; European Superstock 600 Championship

The 2010 FIM Superstock 1000 Cup was the twelfth season of the FIM Superstock 1000 championship, the sixth held under this name. The FIM Superstock 1000 championship followed the same calendar as the Superbike World Championship, with the exception that it did not venture outside of Europe, leaving the schedule at ten rounds.

BMW joined the Superstock grid to bolster the regular manufacturers, and eventually claimed the riders' championship with Ayrton Badovini and the manufacturers' championship as well. Badovini won the first nine races before being beaten by Maxime Berger in the final round.

== Race calendar and results ==
2010 calendar
Round	Country	Circuit	Date	Pole position	Fastest lap	Winning rider	Winning team	Report
1	Portugal	Autódromo Internacional do Algarve	28 March	(Italy) Ayrton Badovini	(France) Maxime Berger	(Italy) Ayrton Badovini	BMW Motorrad Italia STK Team	Report
2	Spain	Circuit Ricardo Tormo	11 April	(Italy) Ayrton Badovini	(Italy) Ayrton Badovini	(Italy) Ayrton Badovini	BMW Motorrad Italia STK Team	Report
3	Netherlands	TT Circuit Assen	25 April	(France) Maxime Berger	(France) Maxime Berger	(Italy) Ayrton Badovini	BMW Motorrad Italia STK Team	Report
4	Italy	Autodromo Nazionale Monza	9 May	(Italy) Ayrton Badovini	(Italy) Ayrton Badovini	(Italy) Ayrton Badovini	BMW Motorrad Italia STK Team	Report
5	San Marino	Misano World Circuit	27 June	(Italy) Ayrton Badovini	(Italy) Ayrton Badovini	(Italy) Ayrton Badovini	BMW Motorrad Italia STK Team	Report
6	Czech Republic	Masaryk Circuit	11 July	(Italy) Ayrton Badovini	(Italy) Eddi La Marra	(Italy) Ayrton Badovini	BMW Motorrad Italia STK Team	Report
7	(United Kingdom) Great Britain	Silverstone Circuit	1 August	(Italy) Ayrton Badovini	(Italy) Ayrton Badovini	(Italy) Ayrton Badovini	BMW Motorrad Italia STK Team	Report
8	Germany	Nürburgring	5 September	(Italy) Ayrton Badovini	(Italy) Ayrton Badovini	(Italy) Ayrton Badovini	BMW Motorrad Italia STK Team	Report
9	Italy	Autodromo Enzo e Dino Ferrari	26 September	(Italy) Ayrton Badovini	(Italy) Ayrton Badovini	(Italy) Ayrton Badovini	BMW Motorrad Italia STK Team	Report
10	France	Circuit de Nevers Magny-Cours	3 October	(France) Maxime Berger	(France) Maxime Berger	(France) Maxime Berger	Ten Kate Race Junior	Report

== Entry list ==
Team	Constructor	Motorcycle	No.	Rider	Rounds
MS Racing	Aprilia	RSV4 1000	69	(Czech Republic) Ondřej Ježek	1–6, 8–10
MS Racing	Aprilia	RSV4 1000	89	(Czech Republic) Michal Salač	1–6, 8–10
Automotoklub Masarykuv Okruh	BMW	S1000RR	16	(Czech Republic) Michal Šembera	6
BMW Motorrad Italia STK	BMW	S1000RR	29	(Italy) Daniele Beretta	All
BMW Motorrad Italia STK	BMW	S1000RR	86	(Italy) Ayrton Badovini	All
Garnier Junior Racing	BMW	S1000RR	20	(France) Sylvain Barrier	All
Garnier Junior Racing	BMW	S1000RR	30	(Switzerland) Michaël Savary	1–4
Garnier Junior Racing	BMW	S1000RR	39	(France) Randy Pagaud	9–10
Lammert Mottorsport	BMW	S1000RR	53	(Germany) Dominic Lammert	1–8
Lammert Mottorsport	BMW	S1000RR	66	(Poland) Mateusz Stoklosa	1–2, 4–8
Millet Moto Sport	BMW	S1000RR	25	(France) Julien Millet	10
Motoracingparts STK 1000	BMW	S1000RR	30	(Switzerland) Michaël Savary	6–10
Sloppy Racing	BMW	S1000RR	35	(United Kingdom) Gavin Hunt	7
Team ASPI	BMW	S1000RR	93	(France) Matthieu Lussiana	All
Barni Racing	Ducati	1098R	98	(Italy) Domenico Colucci	9
SS Lazio Motorsport	Ducati	1098R	87	(Italy) Lorenzo Zanetti	6–10
SS Lazio Motorsport	Ducati	1098R	98	(Italy) Domenico Colucci	5
SS Lazio Motorsport	Ducati	1098R	134	(Italy) Roberto Lacalendola	1–4
Team Pata B&G Racing	Ducati	1098R	14	(Italy) Lorenzo Baroni	All
All Service System by QDP	Honda	CBR1000RR	5	(Italy) Marco Bussolotti	1–6
All Service System by QDP	Honda	CBR1000RR	10	(Italy) Andrea Boscoscuro	7–9
All Service System by QDP	Honda	CBR1000RR	46	(United Kingdom) Tommy Bridewell	10
Bevilacqua Corse	Honda	CBR1000RR	119	(Italy) Michele Magnoni	6–10
Berclaz Racing Team	Honda	CBR1000RR	85	(Switzerland) Gabriel Berclaz	9
Bogdanka Racing	Honda	CBR1000RR	60	(United Kingdom) James Webb	8
Bogdanka Racing	Honda	CBR1000RR	91	(Poland) Marcin Walkowiak	1–6, 9–10
C.S.M. Bucharest	Honda	CBR1000RR	58	(Romania) Bogdan Vrăjitoru	8
Domburg Racing	Honda	CBR1000RR	31	(Netherlands) Roy Ten Napel	8
Extramadura Jr. Team	Honda	CBR1000RR	51	(Spain) Santiago Barragan	2
Kuja Racing	Honda	CBR1000RR	64	(Brazil) Danilo Andric	All
S.C.I. Honda-Garvie Image	Honda	CBR1000RR	119	(Italy) Michele Magnoni	1–4
SMS Racing	Honda	CBR1000RR	36	(Brazil) Philippe Thiriet	All
SMS Racing	Honda	CBR1000RR	55	(Slovakia) Tomáš Svitok	All
Team Lorini	Honda	CBR1000RR	8	(Italy) Andrea Antonelli	All
Team Lorini	Honda	CBR1000RR	47	(Italy) Eddi La Marra	All
Team Shiner	Honda	CBR1000RR	119	(Italy) Michele Magnoni	5
Ten Kate Race Junior	Honda	CBR1000RR	21	(France) Maxime Berger	All
Buldbase Kawasaki	Kawasaki	ZX-10R	77	(United Kingdom) Barry Burrell	7
Team Blackhorse Kawasaki	Kawasaki	ZX-10R	28	(United Kingdom) Victor Cox	7
Team Pedercini	Kawasaki	ZX-10R	9	(Italy) Danilo Petrucci	All
Team Pedercini	Kawasaki	ZX-10R	99	(South Africa) Chris Leeson	All
Goeleven	KTM	1190 RC8 R	11	(Spain) Pere Tutusaus	All
Goeleven	KTM	1190 RC8 R	12	(Italy) Nico Vivarelli	All
Goeleven	KTM	1190 RC8 R	18	(United Kingdom) Kyle Smith	9
Goeleven	KTM	1190 RC8 R	111	(Italy) Marco Rosini	2, 4
Goeleven	KTM	1190 RC8 R	117	(Italy) Denis Sacchetti	5
HM Racing Team	Suzuki	GSX-R1000 K9	155	(Portugal) Tiago Dias	1
MTM Racing Team	Suzuki	GSX-R1000 K9	7	(Austria) René Mähr	1–8
Team06	Suzuki	GSX-R1000 K9	34	(Italy) Davide Giugliano	All
Fox Team	Yamaha	YZF-R1	61	(Italy) Andrea Romagnoli	5
Fox Team	Yamaha	YZF-R1	191	(Italy) Riccardo Fusco	4
La Garriga Competicion	Yamaha	YZF-R1	88	(Spain) Josep Pedro	2
MRS Racing	Yamaha	YZF-R1	41	(United Kingdom) Gregg Black	9
MRS Racing	Yamaha	YZF-R1	65	(France) Loris Baz	1–8, 10
MTM Racing Team	Yamaha	YZF-R1	45	(Norway) Kim Arne Sletten	All
MTM Racing Team	Yamaha	YZF-R1	72	(Norway) Frederik Karlsen	10
Team Rosso e Nero	Yamaha	YZF-R1	6	(Italy) Riccardo Della Ceca	5
Team Trasimeno	Yamaha	YZF-R1	37	(Poland) Andrzej Chielewski	1

Key
Regular rider
Wildcard rider
Replacement rider

- All entries used Pirelli tyres.

== Championship standings ==
=== Riders' standings ===
Pos.	Rider	Bike	POR (Portugal)	SPA (Spain)	NED (Netherlands)	ITA (Italy)	SMR (San Marino)	CZE (Czech Republic)	GBR (United Kingdom)	GER (Germany)	ITA (Italy)	FRA (France)	Pts
1	(Italy) Ayrton Badovini	BMW	**1**	**1**	1	**1**	**1**	**1**	**1**	**1**	**1**	2	245
2	(France) Maxime Berger	Honda	2	Ret	**2**	10	2	Ret	2	2	3	**1**	147
3	(Italy) Michele Magnoni	Honda	15	4	4	2	3	6	5	6	Ret	12	98
4	(Italy) Andrea Antonelli	Honda	8	6	6	Ret	4	3	3	3	Ret	7	98
5	(Italy) Davide Giugliano	Suzuki	7	2	3	17	8	Ret	7	7	4	6	94
6	(France) Sylvain Barrier	BMW	4	3	5	Ret	9	Ret	Ret	4	5	3	87
7	(Italy) Lorenzo Zanetti	Ducati						2	4	Ret	2	4	66
8	(France) Loris Baz	Yamaha	3	5	Ret	Ret	6	9	6	5		Ret	65
9	(Italy) Danilo Petrucci	Kawasaki	9	13	7	5	10	Ret	9	13	7	8	63
10	(Italy) Lorenzo Baroni	Ducati	Ret	10	9	7	Ret	5	Ret	Ret	6	5	54
11	(Austria) René Mähr	Suzuki	Ret	12	8	9	13	7	12	9			42
12	(Italy) Eddi La Marra	Honda	6	Ret	Ret	15	7	Ret	11	8	Ret	9	40
13	(Italy) Daniele Beretta	BMW	Ret	Ret	17	3	11	4	Ret	12	Ret	15	39
14	(Italy) Marco Bussolotti	Honda	5	9	Ret	8	5	Ret					37
15	(Switzerland) Michaël Savary	BMW	10	Ret	Ret	6		10	16	14	8	11	37
16	(Spain) Pere Tutusaus	KTM	11	7	10	11	16	Ret	15	18	12	13	33
17	(France) Matthieu Lussiana	BMW	Ret	Ret	12	4	Ret	Ret	DNS	15	Ret	14	20
18	(Germany) Dominic Lammert	BMW	WD	DNS	11	16	14	Ret	10	11			18
19	(Czech Republic) Ondřej Ježek	Aprilia	12	11	Ret	12	17	11		20	Ret	16	18
20	(Italy) Nico Vivarelli	KTM	14	Ret	15	13	NC	12	18	19	10	Ret	16
21	(Italy) Domenico Colucci	Ducati					12				9		11
22	(Italy) Andrea Boscoscuro	Honda							13	10	DNS		9
23	(United Kingdom) Barry Burrell	Kawasaki							8				8
24	(Czech Republic) Michal Šembera	BMW						8					8
25	(Spain) Santiago Barragán	Honda		8									8
26	(South Africa) Chris Leeson	Kawasaki	16	15	14	18	19	14	17	22	14	18	7
27	(France) Julien Millet	BMW										10	6
28	(Brazil) Danilo Andric	Honda	17	16	DNS	DNS	23	16	21	26	11	20	5
29	(Czech Republic) Michal Salač	Aprilia	20	14	21	20	20	Ret		23	13	24	5
30	(Slovakia) Tomáš Svitok	Honda	21	17	18	19	22	13	20	24	15	19	4
31	(Italy) Roberto Lacalendola	Ducati	Ret	18	13	DSQ							3
32	(Poland) Marcin Walkowiak	Honda	13	19	19	Ret	21	Ret			Ret	22	3
33	(United Kingdom) Victor Cox	Kawasaki							14				2
34	(Italy) Riccardo Fusco	Yamaha				14							2
35	(Brazil) Philippe Thiriet	Honda	18	Ret	20	DSQ	25	15	22	25	Ret	23	1
36	(Italy) Riccardo Della Ceca	Yamaha					15						1
	(Norway) Kim Arne Sletten	Yamaha	22	20	16	Ret	24	DNS	19	21	18	21	0
	(United Kingdom) James Webb	Honda								16			0
	(Switzerland) Gabriel Berclaz	Honda									16		0
	(France) Randy Pagaud	BMW									17	17	0
	(Netherlands) Roy ten Napel	Honda								17			0
	(Italy) Denis Sacchetti	KTM					18						0
	(Portugal) Tiago Dias	Suzuki	19										0
	(Italy) Marco Rosini	KTM		21		21							0
	(Spain) Josep Pedro	Yamaha		22									0
	(Poland) Mateusz Stoklosa	BMW	23	Ret		Ret	26	Ret	23	Ret			0
	(Italy) Andrea Romagnoli	Yamaha					Ret						0
	(United Kingdom) Gavin Hunt	BMW							Ret				0
	(United Kingdom) Kyle Smith	KTM									Ret		0
	(Norway) Frederik Karlsen	Yamaha										Ret	0
	(United Kingdom) Tommy Bridewell	Honda										DNS	0
	(Romania) Bogdan Vrăjitoru	Honda								DNQ			0
	(United Kingdom) Gregg Black	Yamaha									EX		0
	(Poland) Andrzej Chmielewski	Yamaha	WD										
Pos.	Rider	Bike	POR (Portugal)	SPA (Spain)	NED (Netherlands)	ITA (Italy)	SMR (San Marino)	CZE (Czech Republic)	GBR (United Kingdom)	GER (Germany)	ITA (Italy)	FRA (France)	Pts

Colour	Result
Gold	Winner
Silver	Second place
Bronze	Third place
Green	Points classification
Blue	Non-points classification
Blue	Non-classified finish (NC)
Purple	Retired, not classified (Ret)
Red	Did not qualify (DNQ)
Red	Did not pre-qualify (DNPQ)
Black	Disqualified (DSQ)
White	Did not start (DNS)
White	Withdrew (WD)
White	Race cancelled (C)
Blank	Did not practice (DNP)
Blank	Did not arrive (DNA)
Blank	Excluded (EX)

**Bold** – Pole position
Italics – Fastest lap

=== Manufacturers' standings ===
Pos.	Manufacturer	POR (Portugal)	SPA (Spain)	NED (Netherlands)	ITA (Italy)	SMR (San Marino)	CZE (Czech Republic)	GBR (United Kingdom)	GER (Germany)	ITA (Italy)	FRA (France)	Pts
1	(Germany) BMW	1	1	1	1	1	1	1	1	1	2	245
2	(Japan) Honda	2	4	2	2	2	3	2	2	3	1	190
3	(Japan) Suzuki	7	2	3	9	8	7	7	7	4	6	110
4	(Italy) Ducati	Ret	10	9	7	12	2	4	Ret	2	4	92
5	(Japan) Yamaha	3	5	16	14	6	9	6	5	18	21	67
6	(Japan) Kawasaki	9	13	7	5	10	14	8	13	7	8	66
7	(Austria) KTM	11	7	10	11	16	12	15	18	10	13	39
8	(Italy) Aprilia	12	11	Ret	12	17	11		20	13	16	21
Pos.	Manufacturer	POR (Portugal)	SPA (Spain)	NED (Netherlands)	ITA (Italy)	SMR (San Marino)	CZE (Czech Republic)	GBR (United Kingdom)	GER (Germany)	ITA (Italy)	FRA (France)	Pts
