= Akira Yanagawa =

Japanese motorcycle racer (born 1971)

- Nationality: Japanese
- Born: 15 July 1971 (age 55); Kagoshima Prefecture, Japan
Motorcycle racing career statistics
MotoGP World Championship
Active years	2002–2003, 2007
Manufacturers	Kawasaki
2007 championship position	NC (0 pts)
Starts / Wins / Podiums / Poles / F. laps / Points; 4 / 0 / 0 / 0 / 0 / 0
Superbike World Championship
Active years	1994, 1996–2002, 2010
Manufacturers	Kawasaki
2010 championship position	NC (0 pts)
Starts / Wins / Podiums / Poles / F. laps / Points; 121 / 3 / 23 / 2 / 6 / 1207

Akira Yanagawa (柳川 明, Yanagawa Akira; born 15 July 1971) is a Japanese occasional motorcycle road racer. He won three World Superbike Championship races and finished on the podium on 20 further occasions.

== Career ==
Yanagawa started racing on mini-bikes before becoming Japan's 250cc champion in 1989. He moved to his homeland's Superbike championship in 1993. By 1997 Kawasaki considered him ready for the Superbike World Championship.

Initial testing displays and results suggested that they were not wrong. At the A1-Ring, Yanagawa became the first Japanese rider to win a Superbike World Championship race outside his homeland, also winning Sugo later in the year to come fourth overall. 1998 was dominated by two huge crashes. At Monza, the bike hurtled through the gravel at the Ascari Chicane before catching fire due to a burst fuel line, with Yanagawa nowhere near it. At Laguna Seca, he was running second when Doug Chandler's wild card Kawasaki went out of control on the run into the Corkscrew corner and harpooned Yanagawa. It was a frightening moment, yet Yanagawa only missed one further round. He was classified second in that race, as the restart was abandoned following another pile-up. On his return, he took two fourth places, and followed this with two podium results at Sugo. This was good for seventh overall.

In 1999 and 2000, Yanagawa came fifth overall, with a win at Sugo and five third places in 1999. He was ninth in 2001, crashing on lap 1 of his 100th WSBK race at Sugo but scoring two thirds at Monza, as Kawasaki gradually lost interest in the Superbike World Championship, focusing instead on developing a MotoGP bike for 2002. Yanagawa raced in Japan's Superbike series while testing this, and briefly raced it before returning to a testing role. He continued in the All-Japan series, leading it in 2007 before losing out to Atsushi Watanabe, and also entered for a one-off MotoGP round at Motegi in 2007.

== Career statistics ==
=== Superbike World Championship ===
==== Races by year ====
Year	Make	1		2		3		4		5		6		7		8		9		10		11		12		13		Pos.	Pts
Year	Make	R1	R2	R1	R2	R1	R2	R1	R2	R1	R2	R1	R2	R1	R2	R1	R2	R1	R2	R1	R2	R1	R2	R1	R2	R1	R2	Pos.	Pts
1994	Suzuki	GBR	GBR	GER	GER	ITA	ITA	SPA	SPA	AUT	AUT	INA	INA	JPN; 11	JPN; 18	NED	NED	SMR	SMR	EUR	EUR	AUS	AUS					47th	5
1996	Kawasaki	SMR	SMR	GBR	GBR	GER	GER	ITA	ITA	CZE	CZE	USA	USA	EUR	EUR	INA	INA	JPN; Ret	JPN; DNS	NED	NED	SPA	SPA	AUS	AUS			NC	0
1997	Kawasaki	AUS; 4	AUS; Ret	**SMR**; Ret	**SMR**; 5	GBR; DNS	GBR; DNS	GER; 8	GER; 2	ITA; 8	ITA; Ret	USA; 10	USA; 5	EUR; 5	EUR; 4	AUT; 2	AUT; 1	NED; 8	NED; 7	SPA; 4	SPA; 4	**JPN**; 1	**JPN**; Ret	INA; 4	INA; 2			4th	247
1998	Kawasaki	AUS; 5	AUS; 5	GBR; 5	GBR; 16	ITA; Ret	ITA; 6	SPA; 13	SPA; 7	GER; 4	GER; 5	SMR; 5	SMR; 5	RSA; 6	RSA; 5	USA; 2	USA; DNS	EUR	EUR	AUT; 4	AUT; 4	NED; 7	NED; 6	JPN; 4	JPN; 2			7th	210
1999	Kawasaki	RSA; 6	RSA; 5	AUS; 5	AUS; 6	GBR; 5	GBR; 4	SPA; 2	SPA; 2	ITA; 7	ITA; 5	GER; Ret	GER; 3	SMR; 3	SMR; 3	USA; 3	USA; 12	EUR; 6	EUR; 5	AUT; DNS	AUT; DNS	NED; 6	NED; 4	GER; 3	GER; 4	JPN; 3	JPN; 1	5th	308
2000	Kawasaki	RSA; DNS	RSA; DNS	AUS; 9	AUS; 6	JPN; Ret	JPN; 6	GBR; 7	GBR; 5	ITA; 3	ITA; 3	GER; 2	GER; Ret	SMR; 5	SMR; 6	SPA; 10	SPA; 12	USA; 6	USA; 5	EUR; 9	EUR; 5	NED; 6	NED; 2	GER; 4	GER; 3	GBR; 6	GBR; 7	5th	247
2001	Kawasaki	SPA; 8	SPA; 6	RSA; 5	RSA; Ret	AUS; 4	AUS; C	JPN; Ret	JPN; 11	ITA; 3	ITA; 3	GBR; 14	GBR; 8	GER; 12	GER; 10	SMR; 5	SMR; Ret	USA; Ret	USA; 8	EUR; 10	EUR; 8	GER; 4	GER; 9	NED; 8	NED; 6	ITA; DNS	ITA; DNS	9th	170
2002	Kawasaki	SPA	SPA	AUS	AUS	RSA	RSA	JPN; 6	JPN; 6	ITA	ITA	GBR	GBR	GER	GER	SMR	SMR	USA	USA	GBR	GBR	GER	GER	NED	NED	ITA	ITA	23rd	20
2010	Kawasaki	AUS	AUS	POR	POR	SPA	SPA	NED	NED	ITA	ITA	RSA	RSA	USA	USA	SMR	SMR	CZE	CZE	GBR; 19	GBR; 19	GER	GER	ITA	ITA	FRA	FRA	NC	0

=== Grand Prix motorcycle racing ===
==== By season ====
Season	Class	Motorcycle	Team	Number	Race	Win	Podium	Pole	FLap	Pts	Plcd
2002	MotoGP	Kawasaki	Kawasaki Racing Team	48	1	0	0	0	0	0	NC
2003	MotoGP	Kawasaki	Kawasaki Racing Team	48	2	0	0	0	0	0	NC
2007	MotoGP	Kawasaki	Kawasaki Racing Team	87	1	0	0	0	0	0	NC
Total					**4**	**0**	**0**	**0**	**0**	**0**	

==== Races by year ====
(key) (Races in bold indicate pole position, races in italics indicate fastest lap)

Year	Class	Bike	1	2	3	4	5	6	7	8	9	10	11	12	13	14	15	16	17	18	Pos.	Pts
2002	MotoGP	Kawasaki	JPN	RSA	SPA	FRA	ITA	CAT	NED	GBR	GER	CZE	POR	BRA	PAC; Ret	MAL	AUS	VAL			NC	0
2003	MotoGP	Kawasaki	JPN; 18	RSA	SPA	FRA	ITA	CAT; Ret	NED	GBR	GER	CZE	POR	BRA	PAC	MAL	AUS	VAL			NC	0
2007	MotoGP	Kawasaki	QAT	SPA	CHN	TUR	FRA	ITA	CAT	GBR	NED	GER	USA	CZE	RSM	POR	JPN; 17	AUS	MAL	VAL	NC	0

=== AMA Superbike Championship ===
Year	Class	Team	1	2		3		4		5		6		7	8		9		10		11	Pos	Pts
Year	Class	Team	R1	R1	R2	R1	R2	R1	R2	R1	R2	R1	R2	R1	R1	R2	R1	R2	R1	R2	R1	Pos	Pts
2008	SuperBike	Suzuki	DAY; 11	BAR	BAR	FON	FON	INF	INF	MIL	MIL	RAM	RAM	LAG	OHI	OHI	VIR	VIR	RAT	RAT	LAG	34th	20

=== All Japan Road Race Championship ===
==== Races by year ====
(key) (Races in bold indicate pole position; races in italics indicate fastest lap)

Year	Class	Bike	1	2	3	4	5	6	7	8	9	10	11	Pos	Pts
2024	JSB1000	Kawasaki	SUZ	MOT1	MOT2	SUG1	SUG2	MOT	AUT1; 14	AUT2; 15	OKA	SUZ1; 19	SUZ2; 14	21st	8
2026	JSB1000	Kawasaki	MOT	SUG1; 16	SUG2; 17	AUT1; 13	AUT2; 14	MOT1	MOT2	OKA	SUZ1	SUZ2		25th	5
