= 2010 Monza Superbike World Championship round =

(Italy) 2010 Monza Superbike World Championship round
Round details
- Round 5 of 13 rounds in the 2010 Superbike World Championship. and Round 5 of 13 rounds in the 2010 Supersport World Championship.
- Date: May 9, 2010
- Location: Monza
- Course: Permanent racing facility 5.777 km (3.590 mi)

Superbike World Championship
Pole position
(Italy) Max Biaggi
1:42.121
Fastest lap race 1	Fastest lap race 2
(United Kingdom) Jonathan Rea	(United Kingdom) Cal Crutchlow
1:43.031	1:42.937

Supersport World Championship
Pole position
(Turkey) Kenan Sofuoğlu
1:47.848
Fastest lap
(Republic of Ireland) Eugene Laverty
1:47.767

The 2010 Monza Superbike World Championship round was the fifth round of the 2010 Superbike World Championship season. It took place on the weekend of May 7–9, 2010 at the Autodromo Nazionale Monza located in Monza, Italy.

== Results ==
=== Superbike race 1 classification ===
Pos	No	Rider	Manufacturer	Laps	Time	Grid	Points
1	3	(Italy) Max Biaggi	Aprilia RSV4 1000 F	18	31:07.044	1	25
2	52	(United Kingdom) James Toseland	Yamaha YZF-R1	18	+0.247	7	20
3	35	(United Kingdom) Cal Crutchlow	Yamaha YZF-R1	18	+0.297	2	16
4	91	(United Kingdom) Leon Haslam	Suzuki GSX-R1000	18	+0.958	5	13
5	2	(United Kingdom) Leon Camier	Aprilia RSV4 1000 F	18	+4.493	13	11
6	111	(Spain) Rubén Xaus	BMW S1000RR	18	+7.343	6	10
7	84	(Italy) Michel Fabrizio	Ducati 1098R	18	+7.369	3	9
8	11	(Australia) Troy Corser	BMW S1000RR	18	+9.344	11	8
9	66	(United Kingdom) Tom Sykes	Kawasaki ZX-10R	18	+15.338	8	7
10	50	(France) Sylvain Guintoli	Suzuki GSX-R1000	18	+16.761	14	6
11	41	(Japan) Noriyuki Haga	Ducati 1098R	18	+16.921	16	5
12	76	(Germany) Max Neukirchner	Honda CBR1000RR	18	+22.231	9	4
13	67	(United Kingdom) Shane Byrne	Ducati 1098R	18	+22.602	15	3
14	7	(Spain) Carlos Checa	Ducati 1098R	18	+22.742	11	2
15	96	(Czech Republic) Jakub Smrž	Ducati 1098R	18	+26.266	17	1
16	99	(Italy) Luca Scassa	Ducati 1098R	18	+26.415	10	
17	57	(Italy) Lorenzo Lanzi	Ducati 1098R	18	+26.968	19	
18	77	(Australia) Chris Vermeulen	Kawasaki ZX-10R	18	+36.964	18	
19	95	(United States) Roger Lee Hayden	Kawasaki ZX-10R	18	+51.646	22	
20	23	(Australia) Broc Parkes	Honda CBR1000RR	17	+1 Lap	24	
Ret	71	(Japan) Daisaku Sakai	Suzuki GSX-R1000	9	Retirement	21	
Ret	65	(United Kingdom) Jonathan Rea	Honda CBR1000RR	8	Accident	4	
Ret	65	(Italy) Vittorio Iannuzzo	Honda CBR1000RR	1	Accident	23	
DSQ	15	(Italy) Matteo Baiocco	Kawasaki ZX-10R	8	Disqualified	20	
OFFICIAL SUPERBIKE RACE 1 REPORT

=== Superbike race 2 classification ===
Pos	No	Rider	Manufacturer	Laps	Time	Grid	Points
1	3	(Italy) Max Biaggi	Aprilia RSV4 1000 F	18	31:07.122	1	25
2	91	(United Kingdom) Leon Haslam	Suzuki GSX-R1000	18	+4.547	5	20
3	11	(Australia) Troy Corser	BMW S1000RR	18	+5.469	11	16
4	2	(United Kingdom) Leon Camier	Aprilia RSV4 1000 F	18	+10.267	13	13
5	66	(United Kingdom) Tom Sykes	Kawasaki ZX-10R	18	+15.561	8	11
6	41	(Japan) Noriyuki Haga	Ducati 1098R	18	+15.816	16	10
7	50	(France) Sylvain Guintoli	Suzuki GSX-R1000	18	+15.861	14	9
8	96	(Czech Republic) Jakub Smrž	Ducati 1098R	18	+20.977	17	8
9	67	(United Kingdom) Shane Byrne	Ducati 1098R	18	+21.920	15	7
16	99	(Italy) Luca Scassa	Ducati 1098R	18	+21.974	10	6
11	7	(Spain) Carlos Checa	Ducati 1098R	18	+27.152	11	5
12	76	(Germany) Max Neukirchner	Honda CBR1000RR	18	+29.315	9	4
13	77	(Australia) Chris Vermeulen	Kawasaki ZX-10R	18	+30.858	18	3
14	95	(United States) Roger Lee Hayden	Kawasaki ZX-10R	18	+47.160	22	2
15	23	(Australia) Broc Parkes	Honda CBR1000RR	18	+48.824	24	1
Ret	35	(United Kingdom) Cal Crutchlow	Yamaha YZF-R1	12	Oil Leak	2	
Ret	15	(Italy) Matteo Baiocco	Kawasaki ZX-10R	10	Retirement	20	
Ret	57	(Italy) Lorenzo Lanzi	Ducati 1098R	9	Accident	19	
Ret	65	(Italy) Vittorio Iannuzzo	Honda CBR1000RR	6	Mechanical	23	
Ret	84	(Italy) Michel Fabrizio	Ducati 1098R	1	Accident	3	
Ret	52	(United Kingdom) James Toseland	Yamaha YZF-R1	0	Collision	7	
Ret	111	(Spain) Rubén Xaus	BMW S1000RR	0	Collision	6	
Ret	65	(United Kingdom) Jonathan Rea	Honda CBR1000RR	0	Collision	4	
OFFICIAL SUPERBIKE RACE 2 REPORT

=== Supersport race classification ===
Pos	No	Rider	Manufacturer	Laps	Time	Grid	Points
1	50	(Republic of Ireland) Eugene Laverty	Honda CBR600RR	16	28:51.936	2	25
2	54	(Turkey) Kenan Sofuoğlu	Honda CBR600RR	16	+2.817	1	20
3	26	(Spain) Joan Lascorz	Kawasaki ZX-6R	16	+3.043	3	16
4	51	(Italy) Michele Pirro	Honda CBR600RR	16	+21.238	4	13
5	37	(Japan) Katsuaki Fujiwara	Kawasaki ZX-6R	16	+22.003	7	11
6	14	(France) Matthieu Lagrive	Triumph Daytona 675	16	+22.056	11	10
7	7	(United Kingdom) Chaz Davies	Triumph Daytona 675	16	+30.724	9	9'
8	25	(Spain) David Salom	Triumph Daytona 675	16	+30.730	6	8
9	4	(United Kingdom) Gino Rea	Honda CBR600RR	16	+30.857	8	7
10	117	(Portugal) Miguel Praia	Honda CBR600RR	16	+32.265	13	6
11	55	(Italy) Massimo Roccoli	Honda CBR600RR	16	+32.272	10	5
12	45	(Italy) Gianluca Vizziello	Honda CBR600RR	16	+32.976	12	4
13	5	(Sweden) Alexander Lundh	Honda CBR600RR	16	+55.474	7	3
14	19	(Italy) Andrea Boscoscuro	Honda CBR600RR	16	+55.641	14	2
15	8	(Switzerland) Bastien Chesaux	Honda CBR600RR	16	+1:19.469	19	1
16	10	(Hungary) Imre Tóth	Honda CBR600RR	15	+1 Lap	20	
Ret	9	(Italy) Danilo Dell'Omo	Honda CBR600RR	15	Accident	18	
Ret	99	(France) Fabien Foret	Kawasaki ZX-6R	7	Accident	5	
Ret	127	(Denmark) Robbin Harms	Honda CBR600RR	1	Retirement	15	
Ret	40	(United States) Jason DiSalvo	Triumph Daytona 675	0	Accident	16	
OFFICIAL SUPERSPORT RACE REPORT

=== Superstock 1000 race classification ===
Both Roberto Lacalendola and Philippe Thiriet was disqualified post-race after failing to obey a ride through the entire race. Maxime Berger, Davide Giugliano, Eddi La Marra, and Dominic Lammert got 20-second time penalty post-race.

Pos	No	Rider	Manufacturer	Laps	Time	Grid	Points
1	86	(Italy) Ayrton Badovini	BMW S1000RR	11	19:46.264	1	25
2	119	(Italy) Michele Magnoni	Honda CBR1000RR	11	+6.101	3	20
3	29	(Italy) Daniele Beretta	BMW S1000RR	11	+6.371	7	16
4	93	(France) Mathieu Lussiana	BMW S1000RR	11	+6.522	6	13
5	9	(Italy) Danilo Petrucci	Kawasaki ZX-10R	11	+18.222	10	11
6	30	(Switzerland) Michaël Savary	BMW S1000RR	11	+19.518	16	10
7	14	(Italy) Lorenzo Baroni	Ducati 1098R	11	+21.971	15	9
8	5	(Italy) Marco Bussolotti	Honda CBR1000RR	11	+22.147	14	8
9	7	(Austria) René Mähr	Suzuki GSX-R1000 K9	11	+23.423	8	7
10	21	(France) Maxime Berger	Honda CBR1000RR	11	+26.759	4	6
11	11	(Spain) Pere Tutusaus	KTM 1190 RC8 R	11	+32.551	18	5
12	69	(Czech Republic) Ondřej Ježek	Aprilia RSV4 1000	11	+33.301	20	4
13	12	(Italy) Nico Vivarelli	KTM 1190 RC8 R	11	+45.026	19	3
14	191	(Italy) Riccardo Fusco	Yamaha YZF-R1	11	+45.065	24	2
15	47	(Italy) Eddi La Marra	Honda CBR1000RR	11	+46.525	11	1
16	53	(Germany) Dominic Lammert	BMW S1000RR	11	+46.595	17	
17	34	(Italy) Davide Giugliano	Suzuki GSX-R1000 K9	11	+46.756	13	
18	99	(South Africa) Chris Leeson	Kawasaki ZX-10R	11	+51.353	28	
19	55	(Slovakia) Tomáš Svitok	Honda CBR1000RR	11	+1:01.297	22	
20	89	(Czech Republic) Michal Salač	Aprilia RSV4 1000	11	+1:05.467	27	
21	111	(Italy) Marco Rosini	KTM 1190 RC8 R	11	+1:12.676	29	
DSQ	134	(Italy) Roberto Lacalendola	Ducati 1098R	11	(+23.211)	9	
DSQ	36	(Brazil) Philippe Thiriet	Honda CBR1000RR	11	(+59.857)	25	
Ret	66	(Poland) Mateusz Stoklosa	BMW S1000RR	4	Retirement	21	
Ret	20	(France) Sylvain Barrier	BMW S1000RR	3	Accident	2	
Ret	65	(France) Loris Baz	Yamaha YZF-R1	3	Accident	12	
Ret	45	(Norway) Kim Arne Slatten	Yamaha YZF-R1	1	Retirement	23	
Ret	91	(Poland) Marcin Walkowiak	Honda CBR1000RR	0	Accident	30	
Ret	8	(Italy) Andrea Antonelli	Honda CBR1000RR	0	Accident	5	
DNS	64	(Brazil) Danilo Andric	Honda CBR1000RR	0	Did not start	26	
OFFICIAL SUPERSTOCK 1000 RACE REPORT

=== Superstock 600 race classification ===
Pos	No	Rider	Manufacturer	Laps	Time	Grid	Points
1	11	(France) Jérémy Guarnoni	Yamaha YZF-R6	8	15:03.324	2	25
2	343	(Italy) Federico D'Annunzio	Yamaha YZF-R6	8	+5.508	1	20
3	21	(France) Florian Marino	Honda CBR600RR	8	+9.972	3	16
4	84	(Italy) Riccardo Russo	Yamaha YZF-R6	8	+10.214	6	13
5	77	(Italy) Stefano Casalotti	Yamaha YZF-R6	8	+14.388	9	11
6	28	(France) Steven Le Coquen	Yamaha YZF-R6	8	+14.414	12	10
7	10	(Spain) Nacho Calero	Yamaha YZF-R6	8	+19.716	11	9
8	99	(Netherlands) Tony Coveña	Yamaha YZF-R6	8	+19.977	18	8
9	26	(Romania) Mircea Vrajitoru	Yamaha YZF-R6	8	+24.131	16	7
Ret	36	(Argentina) Leandro Mercado	Kawasaki ZX-6R	7	Accident	4	
Ret	22	(France) Cyril Carrillo	Yamaha YZF-R6	4	Accident	14	
Ret	6	(France) Romain Lanusse	Yamaha YZF-R6	3	Accident	8	
Ret	13	(Italy) Dino Lombardi	Yamaha YZF-R6	2	Accident	5	
Ret	72	(Norway) Fredrik Karlsen	Yamaha YZF-R6	1	Accident	17	
Ret	27	(Italy) Davide Fanelli	Honda CBR600RR	1	Accident	15	
Ret	9	(United Kingdom) Joshua Elliott	Kawasaki ZX-6R	1	Retirement	10	
Ret	52	(Belgium) Gauthier Duwelz	Yamaha YZF-R6	0	Technical	19	
Ret	12	(Italy) Riccardo Cecchini	Triumph Daytona 675	0	Accident	20	
Ret	19	(Slovakia) Tomáš Krajči	Yamaha YZF-R6	0	Accident	13	
Ret	69	(France) Nelson Major	Yamaha YZF-R6	0	Accident	7	
WD	82	(Czech Republic) Karel Pešek	Yamaha YZF-R6		Withdrew		
OFFICIAL SUPERSTOCK 600 RACE REPORT
