= 2010 Silverstone Superbike World Championship round =

(United Kingdom) 2010 Silverstone Superbike World Championship round
Round details
- Round 10 of 13 rounds in the 2010 Superbike World Championship. and Round 10 of 13 rounds in the 2010 Supersport World Championship.
- Date: August 1, 2010
- Location: Silverstone
- Course: Permanent racing facility 5.901 km (3.667 mi)

Superbike World Championship
Pole position
(United Kingdom) Cal Crutchlow
2:04.091
Fastest lap race 1	Fastest lap race 2
(United Kingdom) Cal Crutchlow	(United Kingdom) Cal Crutchlow
2:05.259	2:05.421

Supersport World Championship
Pole position
(Republic of Ireland) Eugene Laverty
2:09.426
Fastest lap
(Turkey) Kenan Sofuoglu
2:08.717

The 2010 Silverstone Superbike World Championship round was the tenth round of the 2010 Superbike World Championship season. It took place on the weekend of July 30–August 1, 2010 at Silverstone.

== Results ==
=== Superbike race 1 classification ===
Pos	No	Rider	Bike	Laps	Time	Grid	Points
1	35	(United Kingdom) Cal Crutchlow	Yamaha YZF R1	18	37:47.851	1	25
2	65	(United Kingdom) Jonathan Rea	Honda CBR1000RR	18	+1.621	2	20
3	91	(United Kingdom) Leon Haslam	Suzuki GSX-R1000	18	+11.433	5	16
4	84	(Italy) Michel Fabrizio	Ducati 1098R	18	+15.874	3	13
5	3	(Italy) Max Biaggi	Aprilia RSV4 1000 F	18	+17.085	6	11
6	2	(United Kingdom) Leon Camier	Aprilia RSV4 1000 F	18	+17.532	16	10
7	7	(Spain) Carlos Checa	Ducati 1098R	18	+18.250	10	9
8	52	(United Kingdom) James Toseland	Yamaha YZF R1	18	+18.938	12	8
9	67	(United Kingdom) Shane Byrne	Ducati 1098R	18	+22.997	9	7
10	11	(Australia) Troy Corser	BMW S1000RR	18	+25.830	7	6
11	76	(Germany) Max Neukirchner	Honda CBR1000RR	18	+30.972	18	5
12	50	(France) Sylvain Guintoli	Suzuki GSX-R1000	18	+31.808	11	4
13	96	(Czech Republic) Jakub Smrž	Aprilia RSV4 1000 F	18	+32.193	4	3
14	41	(Japan) Noriyuki Haga	Ducati 1098R	18	+33.206	15	2
15	57	(Italy) Lorenzo Lanzi	Ducati 1098R	18	+34.207	14	1
16	25	(Australia) Josh Brookes	Honda CBR1000RR	18	+35.939	17	
17	111	(Spain) Rubén Xaus	BMW S1000RR	18	+38.282	8	
18	66	(United Kingdom) Tom Sykes	Kawasaki ZX 10R	18	+39.923	13	
19	87	(Japan) Akira Yanagawa	Kawasaki ZX 10R	18	+1:21.620	25	
20	46	(United Kingdom) Tommy Bridewell	Honda CBR1000RR	18	+1:21.678	24	
21	8	(Japan) Ryuichi Kiyonari	Honda CBR1000RR	18	+1:21.793	22	
Ret	15	(Italy) Matteo Baiocco	Kawasaki ZX 10R	13	Retirement	23	
Ret	95	(United States) Roger Lee Hayden	Kawasaki ZX 10R	0	Accident	21	
Ret	23	(Australia) Broc Parkes	Honda CBR1000RR	0	Accident	19	
DNS	99	(Italy) Luca Scassa	Ducati 1098R		Injured	20	

=== Superbike race 2 classification ===
Pos	No	Rider	Bike	Laps	Time	Grid	Points
1	35	(United Kingdom) Cal Crutchlow	Yamaha YZF R1	18	37:48.348	1	25
2	65	(United Kingdom) Jonathan Rea	Honda CBR1000RR	18	+2.070	2	20
3	2	(United Kingdom) Leon Camier	Aprilia RSV4 1000 F	18	+8.834	16	16
4	91	(United Kingdom) Leon Haslam	Suzuki GSX-R1000	18	+13.232	5	13
5	52	(United Kingdom) James Toseland	Yamaha YZF R1	18	+13.258	12	11
6	3	(Italy) Max Biaggi	Aprilia RSV4 1000 F	18	+13.568	6	10
7	50	(France) Sylvain Guintoli	Suzuki GSX-R1000	18	+13.963	11	9
8	67	(United Kingdom) Shane Byrne	Ducati 1098R	18	+14.432	9	8
9	96	(Czech Republic) Jakub Smrz	Aprilia RSV4 1000 F	18	+16.399	4	7
10	7	(Spain) Carlos Checa	Ducati 1098R	18	+19.874	10	6
11	111	(Spain) Ruben Xaus	BMW S1000RR	18	+26.268	8	5
12	25	(Australia) Josh Brookes	Honda CBR1000RR	18	+28.003	17	4
13	41	(Japan) Noriyuki Haga	Ducati 1098R	18	+28.550	15	3
14	66	(United Kingdom) Tom Sykes	Kawasaki ZX 10R	18	+30.117	13	2
15	57	(Italy) Lorenzo Lanzi	Ducati 1098R	18	+30.415	14	1
16	8	(Japan) Ryuichi Kiyonari	Honda CBR1000RR	18	+58.607	22	
17	95	(United States) Roger Lee Hayden	Kawasaki ZX 10R	18	+1:03.157	21	
18	46	(United Kingdom) Tommy Bridewell	Honda CBR1000RR	18	+1:03.298	24	
19	87	(Japan) Akira Yanagawa	Kawasaki ZX 10R	18	+1:20.285	25	
20	15	(Italy) Matteo Baiocco	Kawasaki ZX 10R	18	+1:20.419	23	
Ret	84	(Italy) Michel Fabrizio	Ducati 1098R	14	Mechanical	3	
Ret	23	(Australia) Broc Parkes	Honda CBR1000RR	7	Accident	19	
Ret	76	(Germany) Max Neukirchner	Honda CBR1000RR	6	Mechanical	18	
Ret	11	(Australia) Troy Corser	BMW S1000RR	1	Accident	7	
DNS	99	(Italy) Luca Scassa	Ducati 1098R		Injured	20	

=== Supersport race classification ===
Pos	No	Rider	Bike	Laps	Time	Grid	Points
1	50	(Republic of Ireland) Eugene Laverty	Honda CBR600RR	16	34:35.068	1	25
2	54	(Turkey) Kenan Sofuoglu	Honda CBR600RR	16	+0.220	2	20
3	4	(United Kingdom) Gino Rea	Honda CBR600RR	16	+12.451	6	16
4	7	(United Kingdom) Chaz Davies	Triumph Daytona 675	16	+13.683	9	13
5	127	(Denmark) Robbin Harms	Honda CBR600RR	16	+13.839	5	11
6	117	(Portugal) Miguel Praia	Honda CBR600RR	16	+15.699	12	10
7	14	(France) Matthieu Lagrive	Triumph Daytona 675	16	+16.709	11	9
8	25	(Spain) David Salom	Triumph Daytona 675	16	+17.593	10	8
9	55	(Italy) Massimo Roccoli	Honda CBR600RR	16	+22.837	8	7
10	11	(United Kingdom) Sam Lowes	Honda CBR600RR	16	+23.092	17	6
11	3	(United Kingdom) James Westmoreland	Yamaha YZF R6	16	+31.189	15	5
12	99	(France) Fabien Foret	Kawasaki ZX-6R	16	+32.562	13	4
13	17	(Australia) Billy McConnell	Yamaha YZF R6	16	+37.623	16	3
14	31	(Italy) Vittorio Iannuzzo	Triumph Daytona 675	16	+40.614	19	2
15	37	(Japan) Katsuaki Fujiwara	Kawasaki ZX-6R	16	+40.762	7	1
16	8	(Switzerland) Bastien Chesaux	Honda CBR600RR	16	+54.686	22	
17	21	(United Kingdom) Christian Iddon	Honda CBR600RR	16	+55.198	23	
18	34	(South Africa) Ronan Quarnby	Honda CBR600RR	16	+58.957	18	
19	9	(Italy) Danilo Dell'Omo	Honda CBR600RR	16	+1:11.342	21	
20	12	(United Kingdom) Ian Lowry	Yamaha YZF R6	16	+1:11.723	25	
21	36	(United Kingdom) Max Hunt	Yamaha YZF R6	16	+1:38.475	26	
22	18	(Australia) Mark Aitchison	Honda CBR600RR	16	+1:41.788	20	
23	10	(Hungary) Imre Toth	Honda CBR600RR	15	+1 Lap	28	
Ret	110	(United Kingdom) Jenny Tinmouth	Honda CBR600RR	9	Retirement	27	
Ret	29	(United Kingdom) Alex Lowes	Yamaha YZF R6	0	Accident	14	
DNS	44	(Italy) Roberto Tamburini	Yamaha YZF R6		Did not start	4	
DNS	26	(Spain) Joan Lascorz	Kawasaki ZX-6R		Did not start	3	
DNS	5	(Sweden) Alexander Lundh	Honda CBR600RR		Injured	24	

=== Superstock 1000 race classification ===
Pos	No	Rider	Manufacturer	Laps	Time	Grid	Points
1	86	(Italy) Ayrton Badovini	BMW S1000RR	10	21:45.830	1	25
2	21	(France) Maxime Berger	Honda CBR1000RR	10	+0.149	2	20
3	8	(Italy) Andrea Antonelli	Honda CBR1000RR	10	+4.841	3	16
4	87	(Italy) Lorenzo Zanetti	Ducati 1098R	10	+13.288	8	13
5	119	(Italy) Michele Magnoni	Honda CBR1000RR	10	+14.642	9	11
6	65	(France) Loris Baz	Yamaha YZF-R1	10	+14.807	12	10
7	34	(Italy) Davide Giugliano	Suzuki GSX-R1000 K9	10	+15.070	10	9
8	77	(United Kingdom) Barry Burrell	Kawasaki ZX-10R	10	+15.151	6	8
9	9	(Italy) Danilo Petrucci	Kawasaki ZX-10R	10	+17.146	7	7
10	53	(Germany) Dominic Lammert	BMW S1000RR	10	+22.153	11	5
11	47	(Italy) Eddi La Marra	Honda CBR1000RR	10	+22.229	15	5
12	7	(Austria) René Mähr	Suzuki GSX-R1000 K9	10	+24.700	14	4
13	10	(Italy) Andrea Boscoscuro	Honda CBR1000RR	10	+24.975	16	3
14	28	(United Kingdom) Victor Cox	Kawasaki ZX-10R	10	+25.385	18	2
15	11	(Spain) Pere Tutusaus	KTM 1190 RC8 R	10	+26.852	19	1
16	30	(Switzerland) Michaël Savary	BMW S1000RR	10	+28.703	13	
17	99	(South Africa) Chris Leeson	Kawasaki ZX-10R	10	+40.018	21	
18	12	(Italy) Nico Vivarelli	KTM 1190 RC8 R	10	+58.424	23	
19	45	(Norway) Kim Arne Sletten	Yamaha YZF-R1	10	+1:03.527	24	
20	55	(Slovakia) Tomáš Svitok	Honda CBR1000RR	10	+1:03.626	25	
21	64	(Brazil) Danilo Andric	Honda CBR1000RR	10	+1:06.831	26	
22	36	(Brazil) Philippe Thiriet	Honda CBR1000RR	10	+1:13.480	27	
23	66	(Poland) Mateusz Stoklosa	BMW S1000RR	10	+1:18.821	28	
Ret	14	(Italy) Lorenzo Baroni	Ducati 1098R	8	Technical	5	
Ret	20	(France) Sylvain Barrier	BMW S1000RR	3	Accident	4	
Ret	35	(United Kingdom) Gavin Hunt	BMW S1000RR	0	Retirement	22	
Ret	29	(Italy) Daniele beretta	BMW S1000RR	0	Accident	17	
DNS	93	(France) Mathieu Lussiana	BMW S1000RR	0	Did not start	20	

=== Superstock 600 race classification ===
Pos	No	Rider	Manufacturer	Laps	Time	Grid	Points
1	41	(United Kingdom) Luke Mossey	Yamaha YZF-R6	8	17:55.916	2	25
2	21	(France) Florian Marino	Honda CBR600RR	8	+0.036	1	20
3	11	(France) Jérémy Guarnoni	Yamaha YZF-R6	8	+4.102	3	16
4	27	(Italy) Davide Fanelli	Honda CBR600RR	8	+4.295	5	13
5	13	(Italy) Dino Lombardi	Yamaha YZF-R6	8	+4.653	4	11
6	28	(France) Steven Le Coquen	Yamaha YZF-R6	8	+10.232	6	10
7	52	(Belgium) Gauthier Duwelz	Yamaha YZF-R6	8	+12.060	10	9
8	9	(United Kingdom) Joshua Elliott	Kawasaki ZX-6R	8	+17.268	9	8
9	10	(Spain) Nacho Calero	Yamaha YZF-R6	8	+22.066	8	7
10	99	(Netherlands) Tony Coveña	Yamaha YZF-R6	8	+27.070	13	6
11	6	(France) Romain Lanusse	Yamaha YZF-R6	8	+35.699	7	5
12	69	(France) Nelson Major	Yamaha YZF-R6	8	+36.390	12	4
13	26	(Romania) Mircea Vrajitoru	Yamaha YZF-R6	8	+50.760	14	3
14	66	(France) Richard De Tournay	Yamaha YZF-R6	8	+57.337	11	2
15	19	(Slovakia) Tomáš Krajči	Yamaha YZF-R6	8	+1:10.288	15	1
DNS	72	(Norway) Fredrik Karlsen	Yamaha YZF-R6		Did not start		
