= 2010 Misano Superbike World Championship round =

(San Marino) 2010 Misano Superbike World Championship round
Round details
- Round 8 of 13 rounds in the 2010 Superbike World Championship. and Round 8 of 13 rounds in the 2010 Supersport World Championship.
- Date: June 27, 2010
- Location: Misano
- Course: Permanent racing facility 4.226 km (2.626 mi)

Superbike World Championship
Pole position
(Australia) Troy Corser
1:35.001
Fastest lap race 1	Fastest lap race 2
(Spain) Carlos Checa	(United Kingdom) Cal Crutchlow
1:36.670	1:36.546

Supersport World Championship
Pole position
(Italy) Michele Pirro
1:38.444
Fastest lap
(Turkey) Kenan Sofuoğlu
1:39.239

The 2010 Misano Superbike World Championship round was the eighth round of the 2010 Superbike World Championship season. It took place on the weekend of June 25–27, 2010 at the Misano Adriatico circuit.

== Results ==
=== Superbike race 1 classification ===
Pos	No	Rider	Manufacturer	Laps	Time	Grid	Points
1	3	(Italy) Max Biaggi	Aprilia RSV4 1000 F	24	38:59.319	2	25
2	7	(Spain) Carlos Checa	Ducati 1098R	24	+0.387	5	20
3	11	(Australia) Troy Corser	BMW S1000RR	24	+0.822	1	16
4	84	(Italy) Michel Fabrizio	Ducati 1098R	24	+4.911	3	13
5	50	(France) Sylvain Guintoli	Suzuki GSX-R1000	24	+5.916	6	11
6	2	(United Kingdom) Leon Camier	Aprilia RSV4 1000 F	24	+8.658	14	10
7	41	(Japan) Noriyuki Haga	Ducati 1098R	24	+11.872	9	9
8	91	(United Kingdom) Leon Haslam	Suzuki GSX-R1000	24	+11.907	7	8
9	67	(United Kingdom) Shane Byrne	Ducati 1098R	24	+16.490	15	7
10	52	(United Kingdom) James Toseland	Yamaha YZF R1	24	+18.458	13	6
11	99	(Italy) Luca Scassa	Ducati 1098R	24	+18.646	8	5
12	57	(Italy) Lorenzo Lanzi	Ducati 1098R	24	+19.315	11	4
13	65	(United Kingdom) Jonathan Rea	Honda CBR1000RR	24	+25.405	16	3
14	76	(Germany) Max Neukirchner	Honda CBR1000RR	24	+31.671	17	2
15	66	(United Kingdom) Tom Sykes	Kawasaki ZX 10R	24	+39.658	18	1
16	77	(Australia) Chris Vermeulen	Kawasaki ZX 10R	24	+48.137	21	
17	95	(United States) Roger Lee Hayden	Kawasaki ZX 10R	24	+56.316	20	
18	90	(Italy) Federico Sandi	Aprilia RSV4 1000 F	24	+56.667	22	
19	15	(Italy) Matteo Baiocco	Kawasaki ZX 10R	24	+57.218	23	
Ret	111	(Spain) Ruben Xaus	BMW S1000RR	8	Mechanical	12	
Ret	35	(United Kingdom) Cal Crutchlow	Yamaha YZF R1	4	Retirement	4	
Ret	96	(Czech Republic) Jakub Smrz	Ducati 1098R	1	Mechanical	10	
DSQ	23	(Australia) Broc Parkes	Honda CBR1000RR		Disqualified	19	

=== Superbike race 2 classification ===
Pos	No	Rider	Manufacturer	Laps	Time	Grid	Points
1	3	(Italy) Max Biaggi	Aprilia RSV4 1000 F	24	38:58.149	2	25
2	91	(United Kingdom) Leon Haslam	Suzuki GSX-R1000	24	+4.095	7	20
3	84	(Italy) Michel Fabrizio	Ducati 1098R	24	+4.631	3	16
4	35	(United Kingdom) Cal Crutchlow	Yamaha YZF R1	24	+5.014	4	13
5	7	(Spain) Carlos Checa	Ducati 1098R	24	+6.256	5	11
6	50	(France) Sylvain Guintoli	Suzuki GSX-R1000	24	+7.677	6	10
7	67	(United Kingdom) Shane Byrne	Ducati 1098R	24	+10.144	15	9
8	99	(Italy) Luca Scassa	Ducati 1098R	24	+10.942	8	8
9	41	(Japan) Noriyuki Haga	Ducati 1098R	24	+13.640	9	7
10	11	(Australia) Troy Corser	BMW S1000RR	24	+16.279	1	6
11	2	(United Kingdom) Leon Camier	Aprilia RSV4 1000 F	24	+17.799	14	5
12	65	(United Kingdom) Jonathan Rea	Honda CBR1000RR	24	+22.793	16	4
13	57	(Italy) Lorenzo Lanzi	Ducati 1098R	24	+24.131	11	3
14	76	(Germany) Max Neukirchner	Honda CBR1000RR	24	+28.212	17	2
15	77	(Australia) Chris Vermeulen	Kawasaki ZX 10R	24	+36.551	21	1
16	66	(United Kingdom) Tom Sykes	Kawasaki ZX 10R	24	+49.636	18	
17	23	(Australia) Broc Parkes	Honda CBR1000RR	24	+50.041	19	
18	95	(United States) Roger Lee Hayden	Kawasaki ZX 10R	24	+51.246	20	
19	15	(Italy) Matteo Baiocco	Kawasaki ZX 10R	24	+58.174	23	
20	90	(Italy) Federico Sandi	Aprilia RSV4 1000 F	24	+1:10.588	22	
Ret	52	(United Kingdom) James Toseland	Yamaha YZF R1	10	Accident	13	
Ret	111	(Spain) Ruben Xaus	BMW S1000RR	7	Retirement	12	
Ret	96	(Czech Republic) Jakub Smrz	Ducati 1098R	2	Retirement	10	

=== Supersport race classification ===
Pos	No	Rider	Manufacturer	Laps	Time	Grid	Pts
1	50	(Republic of Ireland) Eugene Laverty	Honda CBR600RR	22	36:46.369	2	25
2	26	(Spain) Joan Lascorz	Kawasaki ZX-6R	22	+3.876	4	20
3	54	(Turkey) Kenan Sofuoğlu	Honda CBR600RR	22	+6.557	6	16
4	7	(United Kingdom) Chaz Davies	Triumph Daytona 675	22	+12.815	7	13
5	44	(Italy) Roberto Tamburini	Yamaha YZF R6	22	+12.927	3	11
6	127	(Denmark) Robbin Harms	Honda CBR600RR	22	+14.248	9	10
7	55	(Italy) Massimo Roccoli	Honda CBR600RR	22	+19.641	8	9
8	99	(France) Fabien Foret	Kawasaki ZX-6R	22	+24.360	10	8
9	117	(Portugal) Miguel Praia	Honda CBR600RR	22	+36.260	12	7
10	25	(Spain) David Salom	Triumph Daytona 675	22	+36.598	11	6
11	14	(France) Matthieu Lagrive	Triumph Daytona 675	22	+36.842	13	5
12	31	(Italy) Vittorio Iannuzzo	Triumph Daytona 675	22	+59.036	19	4
13	85	(Italy) Alessio Palumbo	Kawasaki ZX-6R	22	+59.301	17	3
14	9	(Italy) Danilo Dell'Omo	Honda CBR600RR	22	+59.380	15	2
15	8	(Switzerland) Bastien Chesaux	Honda CBR600RR	22	+1:15.632	18	1
16	82	(Italy) Iuri Vigliucci	Yamaha YZF R6	22	+1:30.639	21	
17	61	(Italy) Fabio Menghi	Yamaha YZF R6	22	+1:39.776	20	
18	33	(Italy) Paola Cazzola	Yamaha YZF R6	21	+1 Lap	24	
19	10	(Hungary) Imre Toth	Honda CBR600RR	21	+1 Lap	23	
Ret	24	(Russia) Eduard Blokhin	Yamaha YZF R6	11	Accident	22	
Ret	77	(Italy) Alessandro Torcolacci	Triumph Daytona 675	7	Retirement	14	
Ret	5	(Sweden) Alexander Lundh	Honda CBR600RR	6	Mechanical	16	
Ret	4	(United Kingdom) Gino Rea	Honda CBR600RR	4	Accident	5	
Ret	51	(Italy) Michele Pirro	Honda CBR600RR	4	Accident	1	
DNQ	19	(Hungary) Nikolett Kovács	Honda CBR600RR				

=== Superstock 1000 race classification ===
Pos	No	Rider	Manufacturer	Laps	Time	Grid	Points
1	86	(Italy) Ayrton Badovini	BMW S1000RR	11	18:21.537	1	25
2	21	(France) Maxime Berger	Honda CBR1000RR	11	+2.576	3	20
3	119	(Italy) Michele Magnoni	Honda CBR1000RR	11	+2.807	5	16
4	8	(Italy) Andrea Antonelli	Honda CBR1000RR	11	+3.872	4	13
5	5	(Italy) Marco Bussolotti	Honda CBR1000RR	11	+15.071	13	11
6	65	(France) Loris Baz	Yamaha YZF-R1	11	+16.266	9	10
7	47	(Italy) Eddi La Marra	Honda CBR1000RR	11	+16.449	6	9
8	34	(Italy) Davide Giugliano	Suzuki GSX-R1000 K9	11	+16.721	7	8
9	20	(France) Sylvain Barrier	BMW S1000RR	11	+17.043	10	7
10	9	(Italy) Danilo Petrucci	Kawasaki ZX-10R	11	+19.830	12	6
11	29	(Italy) Daniele Beretta	BMW S1000RR	11	+22.081	16	5
12	98	(Italy) Domenico Colucci	Ducati 1098R	11	+23.659	8	4
13	7	(Austria) René Mähr	Suzuki GSX-R1000 K9	11	+28.801	14	3
14	53	(Germany) Dominic Lammert	BMW S1000RR	11	+28.960	17	2
15	6	(Italy) Riccardo Della Ceca	Yamaha YZF-R1	11	+29.153	15	1
16	11	(Spain) Pere Tutusaus	KTM 1190 RC8 R	11	+30.983	18	
17	69	(Czech Republic) Ondřej Ježek	Aprilia RSV4 1000	11	+33.490	19	
18	117	(Italy) Denis Sacchetti	KTM 1190 RC8 R	11	+34.044	21	
19	99	(South Africa) Chris Leeson	Kawasaki ZX-10R	11	+39.035	22	
20	89	(Czech Republic) Michal Salač	Aprilia RSV4 1000	11	+43.560	23	
21	91	(Poland) Marcin Walkowiak	Honda CBR1000RR	11	+43.979	25	
22	55	(Slovakia) Tomáš Svitok	Honda CBR1000RR	11	+48.277	26	
23	64	(Brazil) Danilo Andric	Honda CBR1000RR	11	+52.716	27	
24	45	(Norway) Kim Arne Sletten	Yamaha YZF-R1	11	+58.667	28	
25	36	(Brazil) Philippe Thiriet	Honda CBR1000RR	11	+58.746	30	
26	66	(Poland) Mateusz Stoklosa	Honda CBR1000RR	10	+1 lap	24	
NC	20	(Italy) Nico Vivarelli	KTM 1190 RC8 R	11	+38.647	20	
Ret	93	(France) Mathieu Lussiana	BMW S1000RR	1	Retirement	11	
Ret	14	(Italy) Lorenzo Baroni	Ducati 1098R	0	Retirement	2	
Ret	61	(Italy) Andrea Romagnoli	Yamaha YZF-R1	0	Accident	29	

=== Superstock 600 race classification ===
Pos	No	Rider	Manufacturer	Laps	Time	Grid	Points
1	11	(France) Jérémy Guarnoni	Yamaha YZF-R6	10	17:11.087	1	25
2	21	(France) Florian Marino	Honda CBR600RR	10	+0.577	2	20
3	10	(Spain) Nacho Calero	Yamaha YZF-R6	10	+3.375	3	16
4	27	(Italy) Davide Fanelli	Honda CBR600RR	10	+8.412	7	13
5	36	(Argentina) Leandro Mercado	Kawasaki ZX-6R	10	+8.738	5	11
6	343	(Italy) Federico D'Annunzio	Yamaha YZF-R6	10	+8.778	9	10
7	6	(France) Romain Lanusse	Yamaha YZF-R6	10	+9.091	4	9
8	9	(United Kingdom) Joshua Elliott	Kawasaki ZX-6R	10	+15.531	12	8
9	69	(France) Nelson Major	Yamaha YZF-R6	10	+17.283	6	7
10	19	(Slovakia) Tomáš Krajči	Yamaha YZF-R6	10	+22.360	14	6
11	13	(Italy) Dino Lombardi	Yamaha YZF-R6	10	+24.367	10	5
12	72	(Norway) Fredrik Karlsen	Yamaha YZF-R6	10	+27.550	13	4
13	82	(Czech Republic) Karel Pešek	Yamaha YZF-R6	10	+31.102	16	3
14	111	(Italy) Marco Rosini	Yamaha YZF-R6	10	+31.801	17	2
15	26	(Romania) Mircea Vrajitoru	Yamaha YZF-R6	10	+32.053	18	1
16	99	(Netherlands) Tony Coveña	Yamaha YZF-R6	10	+32.365	20	
17	222	(Italy) Matteo Biancia	Yamaha YZF-R6	10	+50.276	21	
Ret	28	(France) Steven Le Coquen	Yamaha YZF-R6	6	Retirement	11	
Ret	52	(Belgium) Gauthier Duwelz	Yamaha YZF-R6	2	Retirement	19	
Ret	84	(Italy) Riccardo Russo	Yamaha YZF-R6	2	Technical	8	
Ret	44	(Italy) Michael Mazzina	Triumph Daytona 675	0	Technical	15	
DNS	22	(France) Cyril Carrillo	Yamaha YZF-R6		Did not start		
WD	23	(Italy) Luca Salvadori	Yamaha YZF-R6		Withdrew		
