= 2011 Aragon Superbike World Championship round =

(Spain) 2011 Aragón Superbike World Championship round
Round details
- Round 7 of 13 rounds in the 2011 Superbike World Championship. and Round 6 of 12 rounds in the 2011 Supersport World Championship.
- Date: June 19, 2011
- Location: Motorland Aragón
- Course: Permanent racing facility 5.344 km (3.321 mi)

Superbike World Championship
Pole position
(Italy) Marco Melandri
1:57.634
Fastest lap race 1	Fastest lap race 2
(Spain) Carlos Checa	(Italy) Marco Melandri
1:58.862	1:59.159

Supersport World Championship
Pole position
(Australia) Broc Parkes
2:02.093
Fastest lap
(United Kingdom) Sam Lowes
2:02.785

The 2011 Aragon Superbike World Championship round is the seventh round of the 2011 Superbike World Championship. It took place on the weekend of June 17–19, 2011 at the Motorland Aragón circuit, near Alcañiz, Spain.

== Results ==
=== Superbike race 1 classification ===
Pos.	No.	Rider	Bike	Laps	Time/Retired	Grid	Points
1	33	(Italy) Marco Melandri	Yamaha YZF-R1	20	40:01.968	1	25
2	1	(Italy) Max Biaggi	Aprilia RSV4 Factory	20	+1.572	2	20
3	2	(United Kingdom) Leon Camier	Aprilia RSV4 Factory	20	+2.432	3	16
4	58	(Republic of Ireland) Eugene Laverty	Yamaha YZF-R1	20	+10.799	6	13
5	66	(United Kingdom) Tom Sykes	Kawasaki ZX-10R	20	+10.847	5	11
6	41	(Japan) Noriyuki Haga	Aprilia RSV4 Factory	20	+11.931	9	10
7	17	(Spain) Joan Lascorz	Kawasaki ZX-10R	20	+12.591	7	9
8	86	(Italy) Ayrton Badovini	BMW S1000RR	20	+16.954	8	8
9	91	(United Kingdom) Leon Haslam	BMW S1000RR	20	+24.205	14	7
10	11	(Australia) Troy Corser	BMW S1000RR	20	+24.694	16	6
11	50	(France) Sylvain Guintoli	Ducati 1098R	20	+24.731	10	5
12	77	(Australia) Chris Vermeulen	Kawasaki ZX-10R	20	+30.407	18	4
13	121	(France) Maxime Berger	Ducati 1098R	20	+34.107	15	3
14	44	(Italy) Roberto Rolfo	Kawasaki ZX-10R	20	+37.233	19	2
15	8	(Australia) Mark Aitchison	Kawasaki ZX-10R	20	+43.004	12	1
16	111	(Spain) Rubén Xaus	Honda CBR1000RR	17	+3 laps	17	
Ret	84	(Italy) Michel Fabrizio	Suzuki GSX-R 1000	9	Accident	11	
Ret	7	(Spain) Carlos Checa	Ducati 1098R	7	Accident	4	
Ret	96	(Czech Republic) Jakub Smrž	Ducati 1098R	5	Accident	13	
Ret	57	(Italy) Lorenzo Lanzi	BMW S1000RR	2	Retirement	20	
OFFICIAL SUPERBIKE RACE 1 REPORT

=== Superbike race 2 classification ===
Pos.	No.	Rider	Bike	Laps	Time/Retired	Grid	Points
1	1	(Italy) Max Biaggi	Aprilia RSV4 Factory	20	40:04.407	2	25
2	33	(Italy) Marco Melandri	Yamaha YZF-R1	20	+4.809	1	20
3	7	(Spain) Carlos Checa	Ducati 1098R	20	+6.944	4	16
4	84	(Italy) Michel Fabrizio	Suzuki GSX-R 1000	20	+9.001	11	13
5	17	(Spain) Joan Lascorz	Kawasaki ZX-10R	20	+11.562	7	11
6	58	(Republic of Ireland) Eugene Laverty	Yamaha YZF-R1	20	+14.288	6	10
7	41	(Japan) Noriyuki Haga	Aprilia RSV4 Factory	20	+15.138	9	9
8	2	(United Kingdom) Leon Camier	Aprilia RSV4 Factory	20	+17.660	3	8
9	91	(United Kingdom) Leon Haslam	BMW S1000RR	20	+24.184	14	7
10	86	(Italy) Ayrton Badovini	BMW S1000RR	20	+24.676	8	6
11	50	(France) Sylvain Guintoli	Ducati 1098R	20	+29.300	10	5
12	8	(Australia) Mark Aitchison	Kawasaki ZX-10R	20	+33.163	12	4
13	44	(Italy) Roberto Rolfo	Kawasaki ZX-10R	20	+38.080	19	3
14	77	(Australia) Chris Vermeulen	Kawasaki ZX-10R	20	+49.042	18	2
15	57	(Italy) Lorenzo Lanzi	BMW S1000RR	20	+53.156	20	1
Ret	111	(Spain) Rubén Xaus	Honda CBR1000RR	10	Retirement	17	
Ret	66	(United Kingdom) Tom Sykes	Kawasaki ZX-10R	6	Accident	5	
Ret	96	(Czech Republic) Jakub Smrž	Ducati 1098R	4	Accident	13	
Ret	121	(France) Maxime Berger	Ducati 1098R	0	Accident	15	
Ret	11	(Australia) Troy Corser	BMW S1000RR	0	Accident	16	
OFFICIAL SUPERBIKE RACE 2 REPORT

=== Supersport race classification ===
Pos.	No.	Rider	Bike	Laps	Time/Retired	Grid	Points
1	7	(United Kingdom) Chaz Davies	Yamaha YZF-R6	18	37:06.751	4	25
2	11	(United Kingdom) Sam Lowes	Honda CBR600RR	18	+0.564	3	20
3	44	(Spain) David Salom	Kawasaki ZX-6R	18	+4.645	2	16
4	55	(Italy) Massimo Roccoli	Kawasaki ZX-6R	18	+10.984	6	13
5	22	(Italy) Roberto Tamburini	Yamaha YZF-R6	18	+23.792	10	11
6	4	(United Kingdom) Gino Rea	Honda CBR600RR	18	+24.009	12	10
7	99	(France) Fabien Foret	Honda CBR600RR	18	+24.297	7	9
8	127	(Denmark) Robbin Harms	Honda CBR600RR	18	+33.850	9	8
9	117	(Portugal) Miguel Praia	Honda CBR600RR	18	+42.657	15	7
10	21	(France) Florian Marino	Honda CBR600RR	18	+42.658	11	6
11	60	(Ukraine) Vladimir Ivanov	Honda CBR600RR	18	+56.947	17	5
12	38	(Hungary) Balázs Németh	Honda CBR600RR	18	+1:02.633	24	4
13	28	(Poland) Paweł Szkopek	Honda CBR600RR	18	+1:06.378	16	3
14	91	(Italy) Danilo Dell'Omo	Triumph Daytona 675	18	+1:12.983	22	2
15	10	(Hungary) Imre Tóth	Honda CBR600RR	18	+1:21.663	23	1
16	5	(Sweden) Alexander Lundh	Honda CBR600RR	18	+1:23.068	14	
17	114	(Switzerland) Roman Stamm	Honda CBR600RR	18	+1:36.654	21	
18	33	(Austria) Yves Polzer	Yamaha YZF-R6	18	+2:02.621	26	
19	19	(Australia) Mitchell Pirotta	Honda CBR600RR	18	+2:05.646	27	
20	24	(Russia) Eduard Blokhin	Yamaha YZF-R6	17	+1 lap	28	
Ret	23	(Australia) Broc Parkes	Kawasaki ZX-6R	15	Accident	1	
Ret	9	(Italy) Luca Scassa	Yamaha YZF-R6	14	Accident	5	
Ret	69	(Czech Republic) Ondřej Ježek	Honda CBR600RR	13	Mechanical	18	
Ret	34	(South Africa) Ronan Quarmby	Triumph Daytona 675	12	Retirement	19	
Ret	31	(Italy) Vittorio Iannuzzo	Kawasaki ZX-6R	11	Retirement	13	
Ret	25	(Slovenia) Marko Jerman	Triumph Daytona 675	10	Retirement	25	
Ret	87	(Italy) Luca Marconi	Yamaha YZF-R6	3	Retirement	20	
Ret	77	(United Kingdom) James Ellison	Honda CBR600RR	2	Accident	8	
DNQ	73	(Russia) Oleg Pozdneev	Yamaha YZF-R6		Did not qualify		
OFFICIAL SUPERSPORT RACE REPORT

=== Superstock 1000 race classification ===
Pos.	No.	Rider	Bike	Laps	Time/Retired	Grid	Points
1	34	(Italy) Davide Giugliano	Ducati 1098R	12	24:25.762	3	25
2	87	(Italy) Lorenzo Zanetti	BMW S1000RR	12	+1.078	2	20
3	9	(Italy) Danilo Petrucci	Ducati 1098R	12	+2.785	1	16
4	59	(Italy) Niccolò Canepa	Ducati 1098R	12	+2.790	4	13
5	20	(France) Sylvain Barrier	BMW S1000RR	12	+8.806	5	11
6	8	(Italy) Andrea Antonelli	Honda CBR1000RR	12	+16.656	6	10
7	21	(Germany) Markus Reiterberger	BMW S1000RR	12	+16.881	9	9
8	67	(Australia) Bryan Staring	Kawasaki ZX-10R	12	+20.834	11	8
9	14	(Italy) Lorenzo Baroni	Ducati 1098R	12	+27.850	14	7
10	15	(Italy) Fabio Massei	BMW S1000RR	12	+28.011	13	6
11	11	(France) Jérémy Guarnoni	Yamaha YZF-R1	12	+28.428	15	5
12	47	(Italy) Eddi La Marra	Honda CBR1000RR	12	+36.245	14	4
13	55	(Slovakia) Tomáš Svitok	Ducati 1098R	12	+37.959	17	3
14	36	(Argentina) Leandro Mercado	Kawasaki ZX-10R	12	+38.019	12	2
15	39	(France) Randy Pagaud	BMW S1000RR	12	+38.419	16	1
16	5	(Italy) Marco Bussolotti	Kawasaki ZX-10R	12	+40.154	18	
17	93	(France) Mathieu Lussiana	BMW S1000RR	12	+47.322	22	
18	29	(Italy) Daniele Beretta	Honda CBR1000RR	12	+52.717	21	
19	120	(Poland) Marcin Walkowiak	Honda CBR1000RR	12	+59.145	24	
20	40	(Hungary) Alen Győrfi	Honda CBR1000RR	12	+59.204	25	
21	27	(Switzerland) Thomas Caiani	Kawasaki ZX-10R	12	+59.424	26	
22	71	(Netherlands) Roy Ten Napel	Honda CBR1000RR	12	+59.796	20	
23	111	(Spain) Pere Tutusaus	Kawasaki ZX-10R	12	+1:06.387	23	
24	141	(Portugal) Sérgio Batista	Kawasaki ZX-10R	12	+1:27.562	28	
25	30	(Romania) Bogdan Vrăjitoru	Yamaha YZF-R1	12	+1:29.130	27	
Ret	6	(Italy) Lorenzo Savadori	Kawasaki ZX-10R	8	Retirement	10	
Ret	32	(South Africa) Sheridan Morais	Kawasaki ZX-10R	1	Accident	7	
Ret	86	(Australia) Beau Beaton	BMW S1000RR	1	Accident	19	
DNS	12	(Italy) Nico Vivarelli	Kawasaki ZX-10R		Did not start		
OFFICIAL SUPERSTOCK 1000 RACE REPORT

=== Superstock 600 race classification ===
Pos.	No.	Rider	Bike	Laps	Time/Retired	Grid	Points
1	3	(Australia) Jed Metcher	Yamaha YZF-R6	10	21:09.901	1	25
2	98	(France) Romain Lanusse	Yamaha YZF-R6	10	+1.279	6	20
3	52	(Belgium) Gauthier Duwelz	Yamaha YZF-R6	10	+7.150	7	16
4	13	(Italy) Dino Lombardi	Yamaha YZF-R6	10	+7.251	2	13
5	43	(France) Stéphane Egea	Yamaha YZF-R6	10	+7.423	3	11
6	60	(Netherlands) Michael Van Der Mark	Honda CBR600RR	10	+7.962	4	10
7	84	(Italy) Riccardo Russo	Yamaha YZF-R6	10	+8.429	8	9
8	4	(United States) Joshua Day	Kawasaki ZX-6R	10	+13.973	9	8
9	92	(Australia) Adrian Nestorovic	Yamaha YZF-R6	10	+22.523	13	7
10	99	(Netherlands) Tony Coveña	Yamaha YZF-R6	10	+22.881	14	6
11	75	(Italy) Francesco Cocco	Yamaha YZF-R6	10	+23.317	10	5
12	7	(France) Clément Chevrier	Triumph Daytona 675	10	+24.933	15	4
13	8	(United Kingdom) Joshua Elliott	Yamaha YZF-R6	10	+27.952	12	3
14	18	(Italy) Christian Gamarino	Kawasaki ZX-6R	10	+32.120	16	2
15	59	(Denmark) Alex Schacht	Honda CBR600RR	10	+35.337	18	1
16	19	(Slovakia) Tomáš Krajči	Yamaha YZF-R6	10	+35.405	20	
17	17	(Italy) Luca Salvadori	Yamaha YZF-R6	10	+36.859	17	
18	26	(Romania) Mircea Vrajitoru	Yamaha YZF-R6	10	+40.697	21	
19	69	(France) Nelson Major	Yamaha YZF-R6	10	+54.504	11	
20	23	(Luxembourg) Christophe Ponsson	Yamaha YZF-R6	10	+59.537	23	
21	78	(Netherlands) Tristan Lentink	Honda CBR600RR	10	+1:15.895	22	
Ret	56	(United States) Austin Dehaven	Yamaha YZF-R6	5	Retirement	19	
Ret	10	(Spain) Nacho Calero	Yamaha YZF-R6	5	Retirement	5	
DNS	71	(United Kingdom) Max Wadsworth	Yamaha YZF-R6	0	Did not start	24	
WD	64	(Italy) Riccardo Cecchini	Triumph Daytona 675		Withdrew		
OFFICIAL SUPERSTOCK 600 RACE REPORT
