= 2010 Imola Superbike World Championship round =

(Italy) 2010 Imola Superbike World Championship round
Round details
- Round 12 of 13 rounds in the 2010 Superbike World Championship. and Round 12 of 13 rounds in the 2010 Supersport World Championship.
- Date: September 26, 2010
- Location: Autodromo Enzo e Dino Ferrari
- Course: Permanent racing facility 4.936 km (3.067 mi)

Superbike World Championship
Pole position
(United Kingdom) Tom Sykes
2:07.341
Fastest lap race 1	Fastest lap race 2
(United Kingdom) Leon Haslam	(Spain) Carlos Checa
1:48.966	1:48.877

Supersport World Championship
Pole position
(Turkey) Kenan Sofuoğlu
1:52.397
Fastest lap
(Republic of Ireland) Eugene Laverty
1:52.198

The 2010 Imola Superbike World Championship round was the twelfth round of the 2010 Superbike World Championship season. It took place on the weekend of September 24-26, 2009 at the Imola circuit.

== Results ==
=== Superbike race 1 classification ===
Pos	No	Rider	Bike	Laps	Time	Grid	Points
1	7	(Spain) Carlos Checa	Ducati 1098R	21	38:27.631	9	25
2	57	(Italy) Lorenzo Lanzi	Ducati 1098R	21	+1.171	5	20
3	41	(Japan) Noriyuki Haga	Ducati 1098R	21	+1.472	15	16
4	96	(Czech Republic) Jakub Smrž	Aprilia RSV4 1000 F	21	+6.691	2	13
5	91	(United Kingdom) Leon Haslam	Suzuki GSX-R1000	21	+9.584	3	11
6	66	(United Kingdom) Tom Sykes	Kawasaki ZX 10R	21	+10.979	1	10
7	84	(Italy) Michel Fabrizio	Ducati 1098R	21	+15.023	10	9
8	67	(United Kingdom) Shane Byrne	Ducati 1098R	21	+15.913	13	8
9	50	(France) Sylvain Guintoli	Suzuki GSX-R1000	21	+17.025	16	7
10	35	(United Kingdom) Cal Crutchlow	Yamaha YZF R1	21	+20.795	12	6
11	3	(Italy) Max Biaggi	Aprilia RSV4 1000 F	21	+21.243	7	5
12	111	(Spain) Rubén Xaus	BMW S1000RR	21	+25.860	8	4
13	99	(Italy) Luca Scassa	Ducati 1098R	21	+31.551	4	3
14	76	(Germany) Max Neukirchner	Honda CBR1000RR	21	+31.689	11	2
15	11	(Australia) Troy Corser	BMW S1000RR	21	+44.349	6	1
16	90	(Italy) Federico Sandi	Aprilia RSV4 1000 F	21	+58.693	20	
17	5	(United Kingdom) Ian Lowry	Kawasaki ZX 10R	21	+1:10.388	21	
18	15	(Italy) Matteo Baiocco	Kawasaki ZX 10R	21	+1:13.648	22	
19	33	(Italy) Fabrizio Lai	Honda CBR1000RR	21	+1:15.939	19	
Ret	52	(United Kingdom) James Toseland	Yamaha YZF R1	7	Mechanical	17	
Ret	95	(United States) Roger Lee Hayden	Kawasaki ZX 10R	1	Retirement	18	
DNS	65	(United Kingdom) Jonathan Rea	Honda CBR1000RR		Did not start	14	

=== Superbike race 2 classification ===
Pos	No	Rider	Bike	Laps	Time	Grid	Points
1	7	(Spain) Carlos Checa	Ducati 1098R	21	38:24.452	9	25
2	41	(Japan) Noriyuki Haga	Ducati 1098R	21	+2.129	15	20
3	35	(United Kingdom) Cal Crutchlow	Yamaha YZF R1	21	+3.926	12	16
4	66	(United Kingdom) Tom Sykes	Kawasaki ZX 10R	21	+5.762	1	13
5	3	(Italy) Max Biaggi	Aprilia RSV4 1000 F	21	+7.025	7	11
6	67	(United Kingdom) Shane Byrne	Ducati 1098R	21	+12.147	13	10
7	57	(Italy) Lorenzo Lanzi	Ducati 1098R	21	+14.212	5	9
8	50	(France) Sylvain Guintoli	Suzuki GSX-R1000	21	+18.029	16	8
9	111	(Spain) Rubén Xaus	BMW S1000RR	21	+18.249	8	7
10	99	(Italy) Luca Scassa	Ducati 1098R	21	+19.446	4	6
11	11	(Australia) Troy Corser	BMW S1000RR	21	+23.674	6	5
12	76	(Germany) Max Neukirchner	Honda CBR1000RR	21	+34.804	11	4
13	90	(Italy) Federico Sandi	Aprilia RSV4 1000 F	21	+53.540	20	3
14	33	(Italy) Fabrizio Lai	Honda CBR1000RR	21	+1'03.102	19	2
15	15	(Italy) Matteo Baiocco	Kawasaki ZX 10R	21	+1'07.185	22	1
16	5	(United Kingdom) Ian Lowry	Kawasaki ZX 10R	21	+1'08.926	21	
Ret	84	(Italy) Michel Fabrizio	Ducati 1098R	13	Accident	10	
Ret	91	(United Kingdom) Leon Haslam	Suzuki GSX-R1000	10	Engine	3	
Ret	96	(Czech Republic) Jakub Smrž	Aprilia RSV4 1000 F	9	Retirement	2	
Ret	95	(United States) Roger Lee Hayden	Kawasaki ZX 10R	9	Retirement	18	
Ret	52	(United Kingdom) James Toseland	Yamaha YZF R1	3	Accident	17	
DNS	65	(United Kingdom) Jonathan Rea	Honda CBR1000RR		Did not start	14	

=== Supersport race classification ===
Pos	No	Rider	Bike	Laps	Time	Grid	Points
1	51	(Italy) Michele Pirro	Honda CBR600RR	19	36:07.906	3	25
2	54	(Turkey) Kenan Sofuoğlu	Honda CBR600RR	19	+2.888	1	20
3	50	(Republic of Ireland) Eugene Laverty	Honda CBR600RR	19	+4.569	2	16
4	23	(Australia) Broc Parkes	Kawasaki ZX-6R	19	+4.865	6	13
5	37	(Japan) Katsuaki Fujiwara	Kawasaki ZX-6R	19	+5.718	4	11
6	55	(Italy) Massimo Roccoli	Honda CBR600RR	19	+6.102	7	10
7	18	(Australia) Mark Aitchison	Honda CBR600RR	19	+9.977	8	9
8	53	(Italy) Cristiano Migliorati	Kawasaki ZX-6R	19	+18.563	13	8
9	44	(Italy) Roberto Tamburini	Yamaha YZF R6	19	+19.987	16	7
10	45	(Italy) Gianluca Vizziello	Honda CBR600RR	19	+28.436	19	6
11	14	(France) Matthieu Lagrive	Triumph Daytona 675	19	+28.508	11	5
12	31	(Italy) Vittorio Iannuzzo	Triumph Daytona 675	19	+42.347	17	4
13	85	(Italy) Alessio Palumbo	Kawasaki ZX-6R	19	+1:05.502	20	3
14	131	(Italy) Giuseppe Barone	Yamaha YZF R6	19	+1:05.930	21	2
15	5	(Sweden) Alexander Lundh	Honda CBR600RR	18	+1 Lap	23	1
Ret	7	(United Kingdom) Chaz Davies	Triumph Daytona 675	18	Mechanical	5	
Ret	10	(Hungary) Imre Tóth	Honda CBR600RR	13	Retirement	24	
Ret	127	(Denmark) Robbin Harms	Honda CBR600RR	10	Mechanical	15	
Ret	4	(United Kingdom) Gino Rea	Honda CBR600RR	3	Accident	9	
Ret	25	(Spain) David Salom	Triumph Daytona 675	2	Mechanical	10	
Ret	99	(France) Fabien Foret	Kawasaki ZX-6R	0	Accident	14	
Ret	117	(Portugal) Miguel Praia	Honda CBR600RR	0	Accident	12	
Ret	34	(South Africa) Ronan Quarnby	Honda CBR600RR	0	Retirement	18	
DNS	8	(Switzerland) Bastien Chesaux	Honda CBR600RR		Did not start	22	
DNQ	24	(Russia) Eduard Blokhin	Yamaha YZF R6		Did not qualify		
DNQ	107	(Italy) Mauro Goffi	Honda CBR600RR		Did not qualify		

=== Superstock 1000 race classification ===
Pos	No	Rider	Manufacturer	Laps	Time	Grid	Points
1	86	(Italy) Ayrton Badovini	BMW S1000RR	12	22:32.770	1	25
2	87	(Italy) Lorenzo Zanetti	Ducati 1098R	12	+0.960	2	20
3	21	(France) Maxime Berger	Honda CBR1000RR	12	+9.632	3	16
4	34	(Italy) Davide Giugliano	Suzuki GSX-R1000 K9	12	+19.747	7	13
5	20	(France) Sylvain Barrier	BMW S1000RR	12	+20.836	5	11
6	14	(Italy) Lorenzo Baroni	Ducati 1098R	12	+28.627	6	10
7	9	(Italy) Danilo Petrucci	Kawasaki ZX-10R	12	+29.700	13	9
8	30	(Switzerland) Michaël Savary	BMW S1000RR	12	+29.841	15	8
9	98	(Italy) Domenico Colucci	Ducati 1098R	12	+37.637	10	7
10	12	(Italy) Nico Vivarelli	KTM 1190 RC8 R	12	+44.362	14	6
11	64	(Brazil) Danilo Andric	Honda CBR1000RR	12	+1:04.230	17	5
12	11	(Spain) Pere Tutusaus	KTM 1190 RC8 R	12	+1:04.274	9	4
13	89	(Czech Republic) Michal Salač	Aprilia RSV4 1000	12	+1:06.388	21	3
14	99	(South Africa) Chris Leeson	Kawasaki ZX-10R	12	+1:07.970	24	2
15	55	(Slovakia) Tomáš Svitok	Honda CBR1000RR	12	+1:08.887	25	1
16	85	(Switzerland) Gabriel Berclaz	Honda CBR1000RR	12	+1:13.280	22	
17	39	(France) Randy Pagaud	BMW S1000RR	12	+1:14.153	23	
18	45	(Norway) Kim Arne Sletten	Yamaha YZF-R1	12	+1:17.008	28	
Ret	47	(Italy) Eddi La Marra	Honda CBR1000RR	11	Accident	8	
Ret	69	(Czech Republic) Ondřej Ježek	Aprilia RSV4 1000	9	Accident	19	
Ret	119	(Italy) Michele Magnoni	Honda CBR1000RR	8	Accident	12	
Ret	36	(Brazil) Philippe Thiriet	Honda CBR1000RR	5	Retirement	26	
Ret	8	(Italy) Andrea Antonelli	Honda CBR1000RR	4	Retirement	4	
Ret	29	(Italy) Daniele Beretta	BMW S1000RR	3	Accident	11	
Ret	18	(United Kingdom) Kyle Smith	KTM 1190 RC8 R	3	Technical	18	
Ret	91	(Poland) Marcin Walkowiak	Honda CBR1000RR	2	Accident	27	
Ret	93	(France) Mathieu Lussiana	BMW S1000RR	2	Retirement	20	
DNS	10	(Italy) Andrea Boscoscuro	Honda CBR1000RR	0	Did not start	16	
WD	41	(United Kingdom) Gregg Black	Yamaha YZF-R1		Withdrew		

=== Superstock 600 race classification ===
Pos	No	Rider	Manufacturer	Laps	Time	Grid	Points
1	21	(France) Florian Marino	Honda CBR600RR	10	19:39.031	3	25
2	15	(Italy) Fabio Massei	Yamaha YZF-R6	10	+1.107	2	20
3	33	(Italy) Giuliano Gregorini	Yamaha YZF-R6	10	+8.442	1	16
4	43	(France) Stéphane Egea	Yamaha YZF-R6	10	+9.372	7	13
5	84	(Italy) Riccardo Russo	Yamaha YZF-R6	10	+10.416	6	11
6	11	(France) Jérémy Guarnoni	Yamaha YZF-R6	10	+12.818	5	10
7	27	(Italy) Davide Fanelli	Honda CBR600RR	10	+13.120	10	9
8	6	(France) Romain Lanusse	Yamaha YZF-R6	10	+13.660	9	8
9	69	(France) Nelson Major	Yamaha YZF-R6	10	+14.077	12	7
10	13	(Italy) Dino Lombardi	Yamaha YZF-R6	10	+16.153	8	6
11	99	(Netherlands) Tony Coveña	Yamaha YZF-R6	10	+17.768	17	5
12	72	(Norway) Fredrik Karlsen	Yamaha YZF-R6	10	+20.337	11	4
13	343	(Italy) Federico D'Annunzio	Yamaha YZF-R6	10	+33.710	14	3
14	53	(Italy) Nicola Jr. Morrentino	Yamaha YZF-R6	10	+33.920	15	2
15	28	(France) Steven Le Coquen	Yamaha YZF-R6	10	+35.811	22	1
16	23	(Italy) Luca Salvadori	Yamaha YZF-R6	10	+36.003	23	
17	75	(Italy) Francesco Cocco	Yamaha YZF-R6	10	+42.172	16	
18	10	(Spain) Nacho Calero	Yamaha YZF-R6	10	+43.245	20	
19	26	(Romania) Mircea Vrajitoru	Yamaha YZF-R6	10	+43.323	24	
20	19	(Slovakia) Tomáš Krajči	Yamaha YZF-R6	10	+43.849	19	
Ret	36	(Argentina) Leandro Mercado	Kawasaki ZX-6R	9	Accident	4	
Ret	30	(Italy) Daniele Aloisi	Yamaha YZF-R6	9	Retirement	13	
Ret	8	(United Kingdom) Glenn Irwin	Kawasaki ZX-6R	4	Accident	18	
Ret	52	(Belgium) Gauthier Duwelz	Yamaha YZF-R6	4	Accident	21	
