= Santiago Barragán =

Spanish motorcycle racer

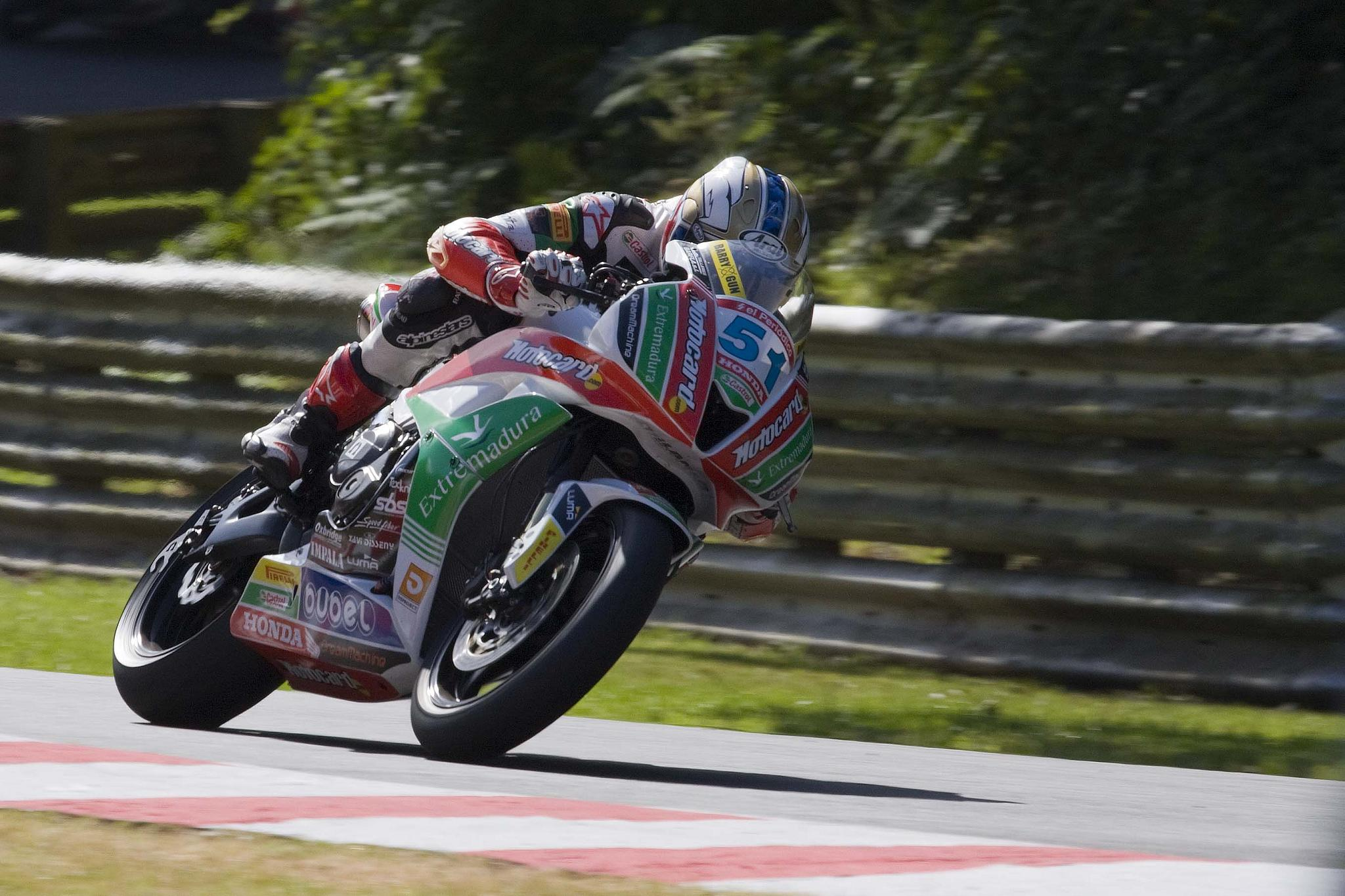
- Barragán at the 2008 Brands Hatch Supersport World Championship round
- Nationality: Spanish
- Born: 18 March 1987 (age 39); Almendralejo, Spain
- Current team: TARGO Bank EasyRace SBK Team
- Bike number: 51
Motorcycle racing career statistics
250cc World Championship
Active years	2006–2007
Manufacturers	Honda
Starts / Wins / Podiums / Poles / F. laps / Points; 3 / 0 / 0 / 0 / 0 / 0
Superbike World Championship
Active years	2011, 2015
Manufacturers	Kawasaki
Starts / Wins / Podiums / Poles / F. laps / Points; 20 / 0 / 0 / 0 / 0 / 17
Supersport World Championship
Active years	2008
Manufacturers	Honda
Starts / Wins / Podiums / Poles / F. laps / Points; 12 / 0 / 0 / 0 / 0 / 0

Santiago Barragán Portilla (born 18 March 1987) is a Spanish motorcycle racer. He currently rides a BMW S1000RR in the FIM CEV Superbike European Championship. He has competed in the 250cc World Championship, the Superbike World Championship, the Supersport World Championship, the FIM Superstock 1000 Cup and the European Superstock 600 Championship; in 2010 he won the European Superstock 1000 Championship and the privateers' class of the CEV Stock Extreme Championship.

== Career statistics ==
2006 - 19th, European Superstock 600 Championship, Yamaha YZF-R6
2009 - 17th, FIM Superstock 1000 Cup, Honda CBR1000RR
2010 - 25th, FIM Superstock 1000 Cup, Honda

- 2012 - 28th, FIM Superstock 1000 Cup, Kawasaki ZX-10R
- 2013 - NC, FIM Superstock 1000 Cup, Kawasaki ZX-10R

=== European Superstock 600 ===
==== Races by year ====
(key) (Races in bold indicate pole position, races in italics indicate fastest lap)

Year	Bike	1	2	3	4	5	6	7	8	9	10	Pos	Pts
2006	Yamaha	VAL; 3	MNZ	SIL	MIS	BRN	BRA	ASS	LAU	IMO	MAG	19th	16

=== Grand Prix motorcycle racing ===
==== By season ====
Season	Class	Motorcycle	Team	Race	Win	Podium	Pole	FLap	Pts	Plcd
2006	250cc	Honda	Extremadura Junior	1	0	0	0	0	0	NC
2007	250cc	Honda	Team Extremadura	2	0	0	0	0	0	NC
Total				**3**	**0**	**0**	**0**	**0**	**0**	

==== Races by year ====
(key)

Year	Class	Bike	1	2	3	4	5	6	7	8	9	10	11	12	13	14	15	16	17	Pos.	Pts
2006	250cc	Honda	SPA	QAT	TUR	CHN	FRA	ITA	CAT	NED	GBR	GER	CZE	MAL	AUS	JPN	POR	VAL; 23		NC	0
2007	250cc	Honda	QAT	SPA; Ret	TUR	CHN	FRA	ITA	CAT; DNQ	GBR	NED	GER	CZE	RSM	POR; DNQ	JPN	AUS	MAL	VAL; 24	NC	0

=== Supersport World Championship ===
==== Races by year ====
(key)

Year	Bike	1	2	3	4	5	6	7	8	9	10	11	12	13	Pos.	Pts
2008	Honda	QAT; 20	AUS; 30	SPA; Ret	NED; 25	ITA; 22	GER; Ret	SMR; 27	CZE; Ret	GBR; 28	EUR; 24	ITA	FRA; 22	POR; 23	NC	0

=== FIM Superstock 1000 Cup ===
==== Races by year ====
(key) (Races in bold indicate pole position) (Races in italics indicate fastest lap)

Year	Bike	1	2	3	4	5	6	7	8	9	10	Pos	Pts
2009	Honda	VAL; Ret	NED; 22	MNZ; Ret	SMR; 11	DON; 19	BRN; 10	NŰR; 15	IMO; Ret	MAG; Ret	ALG; 10	17th	18
2010	Honda	ALG	VAL; 8	NED	MNZ	SMR	BRN	SIL	NŰR	IMO	MAG	25th	8
2012	Kawasaki	IMO	NED	MNZ	SMR	ARA	BRN	SIL	NŰR	ALG; 11	MAG	28th	5
2013	Kawasaki	ARA	NED	MNZ	ALG	IMO; Ret	SIL	SIL	NŰR	MAG; Ret	JER	NC	0

=== Superbike World Championship ===
==== Races by year ====
(key)

Year	Bike	1		2		3		4		5		6		7		8		9		10		11		12		13		Pos.	Pts
Year	Bike	R1	R2	R1	R2	R1	R2	R1	R2	R1	R2	R1	R2	R1	R2	R1	R2	R1	R2	R1	R2	R1	R2	R1	R2	R1	R2	Pos.	Pts
2011	Kawasaki	AUS	AUS	EUR	EUR	NED	NED	ITA	ITA	USA	USA	SMR	SMR	SPA	SPA	CZE	CZE	GBR	GBR	GER	GER	ITA	ITA	FRA	FRA	POR; 20	POR; Ret	NC	0
2015	Kawasaki	AUS; 19	AUS; 13	THA; 17	THA; Ret	SPA; 11	SPA; 17	NED; 17	NED; Ret	ITA; 13	ITA; 11	GBR; Ret	GBR; 15	POR; Ret	POR; Ret	ITA; 19	ITA; 20	USA; Ret	USA; 18	MAL	MAL	SPA	SPA	FRA	FRA	QAT	QAT	23rd	17
