= 2009 FIM Superstock 1000 Cup =

2009 FIM Superstock 1000 Cup
| Previous: | 2008 | Next: | 2010 |
Support series: Superbike World Championship; Supersport World Championship; European Superstock 600 Championship

The 2009 FIM Superstock 1000 Cup was the eleventh season of the FIM Superstock 1000 championship, the fifth held under this name. The FIM Superstock 1000 championship followed the same calendar as the Superbike World Championship, missing out the none European rounds of the championship. 2009 saw very little change from the previous season, with no new European circuits on the calendar.

The title was eventually won by Belgium's Xavier Siméon, who did not in the 10 races of the season finish out of the first 2 positions. Siméon took 5 wins and 5 second positions to take the championship by 57 points from Claudio Corti. Simeon's performance meant that Ducati took the manufacturers' championship by 53 points.

== Race calendar and results ==
2009 calendar
| Round | Date | Round | Circuit | Pole position | Fastest lap | Race winner | Winning team | Report | Ref |
|---|---|---|---|---|---|---|---|---|---|
| 1 | 5 April | Spain | Valencia | (Italy) Davide Giugliano | (Belgium) Xavier Siméon | (Italy) Claudio Corti | Alstare Suzuki | Report | |
| 2 | 26 April | Netherlands | Assen | (France) Maxime Berger | (France) Maxime Berger | (France) Maxime Berger | Ten Kate Honda | Report | |
| 3 | 10 May | Italy | Monza | (Belgium) Xavier Siméon | (Italy) Claudio Corti | (Italy) Claudio Corti | Alstare Suzuki | Report | |
| 4 | 21 June | San Marino | Misano | (Belgium) Xavier Siméon | (France) Maxime Berger | (France) Maxime Berger | Ten Kate Honda | Report | |
| 5 | 28 June | (United Kingdom) Great Britain | Donington Park | (Belgium) Xavier Siméon | (France) Maxime Berger | (Belgium) Xavier Siméon | Ducati Xerox Junior Team | Report | |
| 6 | 26 July | Czech Republic | Brno | (Belgium) Xavier Siméon | (France) Maxime Berger | (Belgium) Xavier Siméon | Ducati Xerox Junior Team | Report | |
| 7 | 6 September | Germany | Nürburgring | (France) Loris Baz | (Belgium) Xavier Siméon | (Belgium) Xavier Siméon | Ducati Xerox Junior Team | Report | |
| 8 | 27 September | Italy | Imola | (Italy) Ayrton Badovini | (Belgium) Xavier Siméon | (Belgium) Xavier Siméon | Ducati Xerox Junior Team | Report | |
| 9 | 4 October | France | Magny-Cours | (Belgium) Xavier Siméon | (France) Maxime Berger | (France) Maxime Berger | Ten Kate Honda | Report | |
| 10 | 25 October | Portugal | Portimão | (France) Maxime Berger | (Belgium) Xavier Siméon | (Belgium) Xavier Siméon | Ducati Xerox Junior Team | Report | |

== Entry list ==
| Team | Constructor | Motorcycle | No. | Rider | Rounds |
|---|---|---|---|---|---|
| JiR Junior Team Gabrielli | Aprilia | Aprilia RSV4 | 14 | (Italy) Federico Biaggi | 1–6, 8, 10 |
| JiR Junior Team Gabrielli | Aprilia | Aprilia RSV4 | 23 | (Italy) Federico Sandi | All |
| JiR Junior Team Gabrielli | Aprilia | Aprilia RSV4 | 81 | (Italy) Ayrton Badovini | 8 |
| JiR Junior Team Gabrielli | Aprilia | Aprilia RSV4 | 81 | (Italy) Ayrton Badovini | 9 |
| Barni Racing | Ducati | Ducati 1098R | 89 | (Italy) Domenico Colucci | 3–4 |
| Ducati Xerox Junior Team | Ducati | Ducati 1098R | 19 | (Belgium) Xavier Simeon | All |
| Ducati Xerox Junior Team | Ducati | Ducati 1098R | 29 | (Italy) Daniele Beretta | All |
| Azione Corse | Honda | Honda CBR1000RR | 26 | (Italy) Andrea Liberini | 9–10 |
| Azione Corse | Honda | Honda CBR1000RR | 63 | (Sweden) Per Björk | 1–8 |
| Azione Corse | Honda | Honda CBR1000RR | 141 | (Italy) Gabriele Perri | 8 |
| Coutelle Junior Team | Honda | Honda CBR1000RR | 30 | (Switzerland) Michaël Savary | All |
| Holiday Gym Racing | Honda | Honda CBR1000RR | 51 | (Spain) Santiago Barragán | All |
| Intermoto Czech | Honda | Honda CBR1000RR | 66 | (Poland) Mateusz Stoklosa | 1–4, 6 |
| MS Racing I | Honda | Honda CBR1000RR | 36 | (Brazil) Philippe Thiriet | All |
| MS Racing I | Honda | Honda CBR1000RR | 77 | (United Kingdom) Barry Burrell | All |
| MS Racing II | Honda | Honda CBR1000RR | 44 | (Hungary) Balázs Németh | 1–2 |
| MS Racing II | Honda | Honda CBR1000RR | 69 | (Czech Republic) Ondřej Ježek | All |
| MS Racing II | Honda | Honda CBR1000RR | 191 | (Slovakia) Tomáš Krajčí | 7–8, 10 |
| Race Junior | Honda | Honda CBR1000RR | 12 | (Italy) Nico Vivarelli | 1–5 |
| Race Junior | Honda | Honda CBR1000RR | 61 | (France) Franck Millet | 4 |
| Race Junior | Honda | Honda CBR1000RR | 61 | (France) Franck Millet | 9 |
| Race Junior | Honda | Honda CBR1000RR | 117 | (Italy) Denis Sacchetti | 6, 8, 10 |
| Supersonic Racing Team | Honda | Honda CBR1000RR | 45 | (Italy) Luca Verdini | 3 |
| Team Cresto Guide | Honda | Honda CBR1000RR | 3 | (Sweden) Alexander Lundh | 6–7 |
| Team Gomme e Service | Honda | Honda CBR1000RR | 9 | (Italy) Matteo Guarino | 4 |
| Ten Kate Honda Racing | Honda | Honda CBR1000RR | 21 | (France) Maxime Berger | All |
| Pro Action | Kawasaki | Kawasaki ZX 10R | 2 | (Italy) Luca Morelli | 1–4, 6 |
| Team Pedercini | Kawasaki | Kawasaki ZX 10R | 99 | (South Africa) Chris Leeson | 10 |
| Team Pedercini | Kawasaki | Kawasaki ZX 10R | 111 | (Spain) Ismael Ortega | All |
| Team Pedercini | Kawasaki | Kawasaki ZX 10R | 112 | (Spain) Javier Forés | All |
| Go Eleven - PMS | KTM | KTM RC8 R | 11 | (Spain) Pere Tutusaus | 1–4, 6–10 |
| Go Eleven - PMS | KTM | KTM RC8 R | 12 | (Italy) Nico Vivarelli | 6–10 |
| Go Eleven - PMS | KTM | KTM RC8 R | 117 | (Italy) Denis Sacchetti | 1–4 |
| UnionBike Gimotorsports | MV Agusta | MV Agusta F4 312 R | 22 | (United Kingdom) Alex Lowes | 1–9 |
| UnionBike Gimotorsports | MV Agusta | MV Agusta F4 312 R | 34 | (Italy) Davide Giugliano | 1–5 |
| UnionBike Gimotorsports | MV Agusta | MV Agusta F4 312 R | 56 | (Slovakia) Tomáš Svitok | 7–9 |
| Alstare Suzuki BRUX | Suzuki | Suzuki GSX-R1000 K9 | 71 | (Italy) Claudio Corti | All |
| Boselli Races | Suzuki | Suzuki GSX-R1000 K9 | 73 | (Italy) Simone Saltarelli | 8 |
| BWIN Yoshimura Racing | Suzuki | Suzuki GSX-R1000 K9 | 53 | (Germany) Dominic Lammert | All |
| Celani Race | Suzuki | Suzuki GSX-R1000 K9 | 34 | (Italy) Davide Giugliano | 6–8 |
| Celani Race | Suzuki | Suzuki GSX-R1000 K9 | 86 | (France) Loïc Napoleone | 1–5 |
| TKR Suzuki Switzerland | Suzuki | Suzuki GSX-R1000 K9 | 7 | (Austria) René Mähr | All |
| Bevilacqua Corse | Yamaha | Yamaha YZF-R1 | 119 | (Italy) Michele Magnoni | 4, 8 |
| Bily Racing Team | Yamaha | Yamaha YZF-R1 | 88 | (Slovakia) Jaroslav Černý | 10 |
| Duterne Racing | Yamaha | Yamaha YZF-R1 | 38 | (France) Grégory Leblanc | 9 |
| Garnier Junior Racing Team | Yamaha | Yamaha YZF-R1 | 20 | (France) Sylvain Barrier | All |
| Garnier Junior Racing Team | Yamaha | Yamaha YZF-R1 | 25 | (United Kingdom) Gregg Black | 1–6 |
| Garnier Junior Racing Team | Yamaha | Yamaha YZF-R1 | 39 | (France) Julien Millet | 8–10 |
| IamaLoures Cetelem Yamaha | Yamaha | Yamaha YZF-R1 | 55 | (Portugal) Tiago Dias | 10 |
| LW Bogdanka Racing Team | Yamaha | Yamaha YZF-R1 | 120 | (Poland) Marcin Walkowiak | 6 |
| MRS Racing | Yamaha | Yamaha YZF-R1 | 65 | (France) Loris Baz | All |
| MRS Racing | Yamaha | Yamaha YZF-R1 | 72 | (France) Nicolas Pouhair | 1–7 |
| MRS Racing | Yamaha | Yamaha YZF-R1 | 86 | (France) Loïc Napoleone | 8–10 |
| MTM Racing Team | Yamaha | Yamaha YZF-R1 | 5 | (Netherlands) Danny De Boer | 1–3 |
| MTM Racing Team | Yamaha | Yamaha YZF-R1 | 57 | (Norway) Arne Sletten | 5–6, 8–10 |
| Racing Team Oliveira | Yamaha | Yamaha YZF-R1 | 35 | (Netherlands) Allard Kerkhoven | 2 |
| RT Motorsport | Yamaha | Yamaha YZF-R1 | 87 | (Australia) Gareth Jones | 2 |
| SRT Yamaha | Yamaha | Yamaha YZF-R1 | 91 | (Sweden) Hampus Johansson | All |
| Team ASPI-CSM Bucharest | Yamaha | Yamaha YZF-R1 | 72 | (France) Nicolas Pouhair | 10 |
| Team ASPI-CSM Bucharest | Yamaha | Yamaha YZF-R1 | 93 | (France) Matthieu Lussiana | All |
| Team Blackhorse Yamaha | Yamaha | Yamaha YZF-R1 | 49 | (United Kingdom) Conor Cummins | 5 |
| VD Heyden Motors Yamaha | Yamaha | Yamaha YZF-R1 | 16 | (Netherlands) Raymond Schouten | All |
| Yamaha Italia Jr. Trasimeno | Yamaha | Yamaha YZF-R1 | 8 | (Italy) Andrea Antonelli | All |
| Yamaha Italia Jr. Trasimeno | Yamaha | Yamaha YZF-R1 | 64 | (Brazil) Danilo Andric | All |
| Yamaha Lorenzini by Leoni | Yamaha | Yamaha YZF-R1 | 34 | (Italy) Davide Giugliano | 9 |
| Yamaha Lorenzini by Leoni | Yamaha | Yamaha YZF-R1 | 46 | (United Kingdom) Tommy Bridewell | 1–3 |
| Yamaha Lorenzini by Leoni | Yamaha | Yamaha YZF-R1 | 84 | (Italy) Fabio Massei | 4–10 |
| Yamaha Lorenzini by Leoni | Yamaha | Yamaha YZF-R1 | 107 | (Italy) Niccolò Rosso | 1–6 |
| Team RCGM Moto 2000 | Yamaha | Yamaha YZF-R1 | 41 | (Italy) Lorenzo Baroni | 6–10 |
| Team RCGM Moto 2000 | Yamaha | Yamaha YZF-R1 | 45 | (Italy) Luca Verdini | 4–5 |
| Team RCGM Moto 2000 | Yamaha | Yamaha YZF-R1 | 119 | (Italy) Michele Magnoni | 1–2 |
| Team RCGM Moto 2000 | Yamaha | Yamaha YZF-R1 | 131 | (Italy) Patrizio Valsecchi | 3–5, 7–9 |

Key
Regular rider
Wildcard rider
Replacement rider

- All entries used Pirelli tyres.

== Championship standings ==
=== Riders' standings ===
| Pos. | Rider | Bike | SPA (Spain) | NED (Netherlands) | ITA (Italy) | SMR (San Marino) | GBR (United Kingdom) | CZE (Czech Republic) | GER (Germany) | ITA (Italy) | FRA (France) | POR (Portugal) | Pts |
|---|---|---|---|---|---|---|---|---|---|---|---|---|---|
| 1 | (Belgium) Xavier Siméon | Ducati | 2 | 2 | **2** | **2** | **1** | **1** | 1 | 1 | **2** | 1 | 225 |
| 2 | (Italy) Claudio Corti | Suzuki | 1 | 5 | 1 | 4 | 2 | 6 | 5 | 2 | 4 | 2 | 168 |
| 3 | (France) Maxime Berger | Honda | 3 | **1** | Ret | 1 | 3 | Ret | 2 | Ret | 1 | **5** | 138 |
| 4 | (Spain) Javier Forés | Kawasaki | 4 | 4 | 3 | 7 | 4 | 2 | 3 | 9 | 7 | 3 | 132 |
| 5 | (France) Sylvain Barrier | Yamaha | Ret | 3 | 5 | 3 | 5 | 4 | Ret | 16 | 3 | 7 | 92 |
| 6 | (Italy) Daniele Beretta | Ducati | 6 | 11 | 4 | 8 | 7 | 5 | 6 | 4 | 10 | Ret | 85 |
| 7 | (Czech Republic) Ondřej Ježek | Honda | 7 | 13 | 6 | 10 | 12 | 3 | 8 | 8 | 12 | 8 | 76 |
| 8 | (France) Loris Baz | Yamaha | Ret | 6 | 10 | 9 | 6 | Ret | **14** | 10 | 6 | 6 | 61 |
| 9 | (Austria) René Mähr | Suzuki | 11 | 16 | 29 | 12 | 13 | 8 | Ret | 12 | 5 | 4 | 48 |
| 10 | (Italy) Davide Giugliano | MV Agusta | **Ret** | 8 | Ret | 6 | 16 | | | | | | 43 |
| 10 | (Italy) Davide Giugliano | Suzuki | | | | | | 9 | 4 | Ret | | | 43 |
| 10 | (Italy) Davide Giugliano | Yamaha | | | | | | | | | 11 | | 43 |
| 11 | (Switzerland) Michaël Savary | Honda | 12 | Ret | 11 | 13 | 10 | 11 | 9 | 14 | 9 | Ret | 39 |
| 12 | (Italy) Michele Magnoni | Yamaha | 8 | 17 | | 5 | | | | 3 | | | 35 |
| 13 | (Italy) Andrea Antonelli | Yamaha | 10 | 12 | Ret | 14 | 25 | Ret | 7 | Ret | Ret | 12 | 25 |
| 14 | (Germany) Dominic Lammert | Suzuki | 15 | 14 | 28 | 18 | 14 | DNS | Ret | 5 | 15 | 9 | 24 |
| 15 | (United Kingdom) Barry Burrell | Honda | 5 | 9 | Ret | 23 | 15 | Ret | Ret | Ret | 13 | 15 | 23 |
| 16 | (Netherlands) Raymond Schouten | Yamaha | 19 | 10 | NC | Ret | 8 | Ret | DSQ | 17 | 8 | DNS | 22 |
| 17 | (Spain) Santiago Barragán | Honda | Ret | 22 | Ret | 11 | 19 | 10 | 15 | Ret | Ret | 10 | 18 |
| 18 | (Italy) Lorenzo Baroni | Yamaha | | | | | | 21 | 10 | 7 | Ret | 17 | 15 |
| 19 | (Italy) Federico Sandi | Aprilia | DNS | 29 | 8 | 26 | Ret | 12 | Ret | DSQ | 21 | 13 | 15 |
| 20 | (Spain) Ismael Ortega | Kawasaki | 9 | 15 | 13 | Ret | 26 | Ret | 13 | Ret | 20 | 19 | 14 |
| 21 | (Italy) Fabio Massei | Yamaha | | | | DNS | 21 | 15 | 22 | 13 | 14 | 11 | 11 |
| 22 | (Italy) Simone Saltarelli | Suzuki | | | | | | | | 6 | | | 10 |
| 23 | (Sweden) Alexander Lundh | Honda | | | | | | 7 | 18 | | | | 9 |
| 24 | (Italy) Luca Verdini | Honda | | | 7 | | | | | | | | 9 |
| 24 | (Italy) Luca Verdini | Yamaha | | | | Ret | 24 | | | | | | 9 |
| 25 | (Australia) Gareth Jones | Yamaha | | 7 | | | | | | | | | 9 |
| 26 | (United Kingdom) Alex Lowes | MV Agusta | Ret | Ret | Ret | 25 | Ret | 13 | Ret | 11 | 16 | | 8 |
| 27 | (United Kingdom) Gregg Black | Yamaha | Ret | 21 | Ret | 17 | 9 | Ret | | | | | 7 |
| 28 | (Italy) Patrizio Valsecchi | Yamaha | | | 9 | 28 | Ret | | 19 | Ret | DNS | | 7 |
| 29 | (France) Loïc Napoleone | Suzuki | Ret | 24 | 26 | 15 | 11 | | | | | | 6 |
| 29 | (France) Loïc Napoleone | Yamaha | | | | | | | | Ret | Ret | Ret | 6 |
| 30 | (Sweden) Hampus Johansson | Yamaha | DNS | 26 | 18 | 20 | 20 | EX | 11 | 18 | 23 | 16 | 5 |
| 31 | (France) Matthieu Lussiana | Yamaha | 16 | Ret | 16 | Ret | Ret | 16 | 12 | Ret | 18 | Ret | 4 |
| 32 | (Italy) Federico Biaggi | Aprilia | Ret | Ret | 12 | 24 | DNS | 24 | | 23 | | 26 | 4 |
| 33 | (Italy) Denis Sacchetti | KTM | 18 | Ret | 17 | Ret | | | | | | | 4 |
| 33 | (Italy) Denis Sacchetti | Honda | | | | | | 14 | | Ret | | 14 | 4 |
| 34 | (United Kingdom) Tommy Bridewell | Yamaha | 13 | 20 | 19 | | | | | | | | 3 |
| 35 | (Italy) Luca Morelli | Kawasaki | Ret | 23 | 14 | 16 | | WD | | | | | 2 |
| 36 | (France) Nicolas Pouhair | Yamaha | 14 | 27 | 20 | 31 | 23 | 19 | 16 | | | 20 | 2 |
| 37 | (France) Julien Millet | Yamaha | | | | | | | | 15 | 17 | 23 | 1 |
| 38 | (Italy) Niccolò Rosso | Yamaha | 21 | Ret | 15 | 22 | 17 | Ret | | | | | 1 |
| | (Netherlands) Danny De Boer | Yamaha | 17 | 19 | 23 | | | | | | | | 0 |
| | (Spain) Pere Tutusaus | KTM | 20 | 30 | 27 | 33 | | 17 | Ret | 20 | 19 | 18 | 0 |
| | (Sweden) Per Björk | Honda | 22 | 28 | Ret | 29 | Ret | Ret | 17 | Ret | | | 0 |
| | (Netherlands) Allard Kerkhoven | Yamaha | | 18 | | | | | | | | | 0 |
| | (United Kingdom) Conor Cummins | Yamaha | | | | | 18 | | | | | | 0 |
| | (Norway) Arne Sletten | Yamaha | | | | | 22 | 18 | | 19 | Ret | Ret | 0 |
| | (Italy) Nico Vivarelli | Honda | WD | 31 | 24 | 19 | Ret | | | | | | 0 |
| | (Italy) Nico Vivarelli | KTM | | | | | | 20 | 20 | 21 | 27 | 21 | 0 |
| | (France) Franck Millet | Honda | | | | 21 | | | | | 24 | | 0 |
| | (Brazil) Danilo Andric | Yamaha | 24 | Ret | 22 | 32 | 28 | 25 | 21 | 22 | 26 | Ret | 0 |
| | (Poland) Marcin Walkowiak | Yamaha | | | | | | 22 | | | | | 0 |
| | (France) Grégory Leblanc | Yamaha | | | | | | | | | 22 | | 0 |
| | (South Africa) Chris Leeson | Kawasaki | | | | | | | | | | 22 | 0 |
| | (Slovakia) Jaroslav Černý | Yamaha | | | | | | | | | | 24 | 0 |
| | (Slovakia) Tomáš Svitok | MV Agusta | | | | | | | Ret | 24 | 25 | | 0 |
| | (Italy) Matteo Guarino | Honda | | | | 27 | | | | | | | 0 |
| | (Brazil) Philippe Thiriet | Honda | 23 | 32 | 25 | 30 | 27 | 23 | Ret | 26 | 28 | 27 | 0 |
| | (Hungary) Balázs Németh | Honda | Ret | 25 | | | | | | | | | 0 |
| | (Slovakia) Tomáš Krajčí | Honda | | | | | | | DNQ | 25 | | Ret | 0 |
| | (Portugal) Tiago Dias | Yamaha | | | | | | | | | | 25 | 0 |
| | (Italy) Domenico Colucci | Ducati | | | 26 | Ret | | | | | | | 0 |
| | (Poland) Mateusz Stoklosa | Honda | DNS | 33 | Ret | DNS | | WD | | | | | 0 |
| | (Italy) Ayrton Badovini | Aprilia | | | | | | | | **DSQ** | Ret | | 0 |
| | (Italy) Andrea Liberini | Honda | | | | | | | | | Ret | Ret | 0 |
| | (Italy) Gabriele Perri | Honda | | | | | | | | DNQ | | | |
| Pos. | Rider | Bike | SPA (Spain) | NED (Netherlands) | ITA (Italy) | SMR (San Marino) | GBR (United Kingdom) | CZE (Czech Republic) | GER (Germany) | ITA (Italy) | FRA (France) | POR (Portugal) | Pts |

| Colour | Result |
|---|---|
| Gold | Winner |
| Silver | Second place |
| Bronze | Third place |
| Green | Points classification |
| Blue | Non-points classification |
| Blue | Non-classified finish (NC) |
| Purple | Retired, not classified (Ret) |
| Red | Did not qualify (DNQ) |
| Red | Did not pre-qualify (DNPQ) |
| Black | Disqualified (DSQ) |
| White | Did not start (DNS) |
| White | Withdrew (WD) |
| White | Race cancelled (C) |
| Blank | Did not practice (DNP) |
| Blank | Did not arrive (DNA) |
| Blank | Excluded (EX) |

**Bold** – Pole position
Italics – Fastest lap

=== Manufacturers' standings ===
| Pos. | Manufacturer | SPA (Spain) | NED (Netherlands) | ITA (Italy) | SMR (San Marino) | GBR (United Kingdom) | CZE (Czech Republic) | GER (Germany) | ITA (Italy) | FRA (France) | POR (Portugal) | Pts |
|---|---|---|---|---|---|---|---|---|---|---|---|---|
| 1 | (Italy) Ducati | 2 | 2 | 2 | 2 | 1 | 1 | 1 | 1 | 2 | 1 | 225 |
| 2 | (Japan) Honda | 3 | 1 | 6 | 1 | 3 | 3 | 2 | 8 | 1 | 5 | 172 |
| 3 | (Japan) Suzuki | 1 | 5 | 1 | 4 | 2 | 6 | 4 | 2 | 4 | 2 | 170 |
| 4 | (Japan) Kawasaki | 4 | 4 | 3 | 7 | 4 | 2 | 3 | 9 | 7 | 3 | 132 |
| 5 | (Japan) Yamaha | 8 | 3 | 5 | 3 | 5 | 4 | 7 | 3 | 3 | 6 | 126 |
| 6 | (Italy) MV Agusta | Ret | 8 | Ret | 6 | 16 | 13 | Ret | 11 | 16 | | 26 |
| 7 | (Italy) Aprilia | Ret | 29 | 8 | 24 | Ret | 12 | Ret | 23 | 21 | 13 | 15 |
| | (Austria) KTM | 18 | 30 | 17 | 33 | | 17 | 20 | 20 | 19 | 18 | 0 |
| Pos. | Manufacturer | SPA (Spain) | NED (Netherlands) | ITA (Italy) | SMR (San Marino) | GBR (United Kingdom) | CZE (Czech Republic) | GER (Germany) | ITA (Italy) | FRA (France) | POR (Portugal) | Pts |
