= Roberto Lacalendola =

Italian motorcycle racer

- Nationality: Italian
- Born: 30 June 1988 (age 38); Turin, Italy

Roberto Lacalendola (born 30 June 1988) is a Grand Prix motorcycle racer from Italy.

== Career statistics ==
- 2010 - 31st, FIM Superstock 1000 Cup, Ducati

=== CIV Championship (Campionato Italiano Velocita) ===
==== Races by year ====
(key) (Races in bold indicate pole position; races in italics indicate fastest lap)

Year	Class	Bike	1	2	3	4	5	6	Pos	Pts
2004	125cc	Aprilia	MUG; 17	IMO; 11	VAL1; 6	MIS; 12	VAL2; 13		12th	22
2005	125cc	Honda	VAL; 10	MON; 13	IMO; 17	MIS1; 10	MUG; 11	MIS2; Ret	16th	20

=== Superstock 1000 Cup ===
==== Races by year ====
(key) (Races in bold indicate pole position) (Races in italics indicate fastest lap)

Year	Bike	1	2	3	4	5	6	7	8	9	10	Pos	Pts
2010	Ducati	ALG; Ret	VAL; 18	NED; 13	MNZ; DSQ	SMR	BRN	SIL	NŰR	IMO	MAG	31st	3

=== Grand Prix motorcycle racing ===
==== By season ====
Season	Class	Motorcycle	Team	Number	Race	Win	Podium	Pole	FLap	Pts	Plcd
2006	125cc	Aprilia	Ticinohosting-MTR	87	1	0	0	0	0	0	NC
2006	125cc	Aprilia	3C Racing	87	4	0	0	0	0	0	NC
2007	125cc	Aprilia	M.C. Terzo Bandini	87	1	0	0	0	0	0	NC
2007	125cc	Aprilia	Ellegi Racing	87	1	0	0	0	0	0	NC
2008	125cc	Aprilia	Matteoni Racing	19	8	0	0	0	0	0	NC
Total					**15**	**0**	**0**	**0**	**0**	**0**	

==== Races by year ====
Year	Class	Bike	1	2	3	4	5	6	7	8	9	10	11	12	13	14	15	16	17	Pos	Pts
2006	125cc	Aprilia	SPA	QAT	TUR	CHN	FRA	ITA; 23	CAT	NED	GBR	GER	CZE	MAL; 25	AUS; 26	JPN; 21	POR; DNS	VAL; 34		NC	0
2007	125cc	Aprilia	QAT	SPA	TUR	CHN	FRA	ITA; Ret	CAT	GBR	NED	GER	CZE	RSM; 25	POR	JPN	AUS	MAL	VAL	NC	0
2008	125cc	Aprilia	QAT; Ret	SPA; 20	POR; DNS	CHN; Ret	FRA; 18	ITA; Ret	CAT; 23	GBR; Ret	NED; Ret	GER	CZE	RSM	INP	JPN	AUS	MAL	VAL	NC	0

Sporting positions
Preceded by Luca Verdini	Italian 125GP Champion; 2007	Succeeded by Lorenzo Savadori
