= Ayrton Badovini =

Italian motorcycle racer

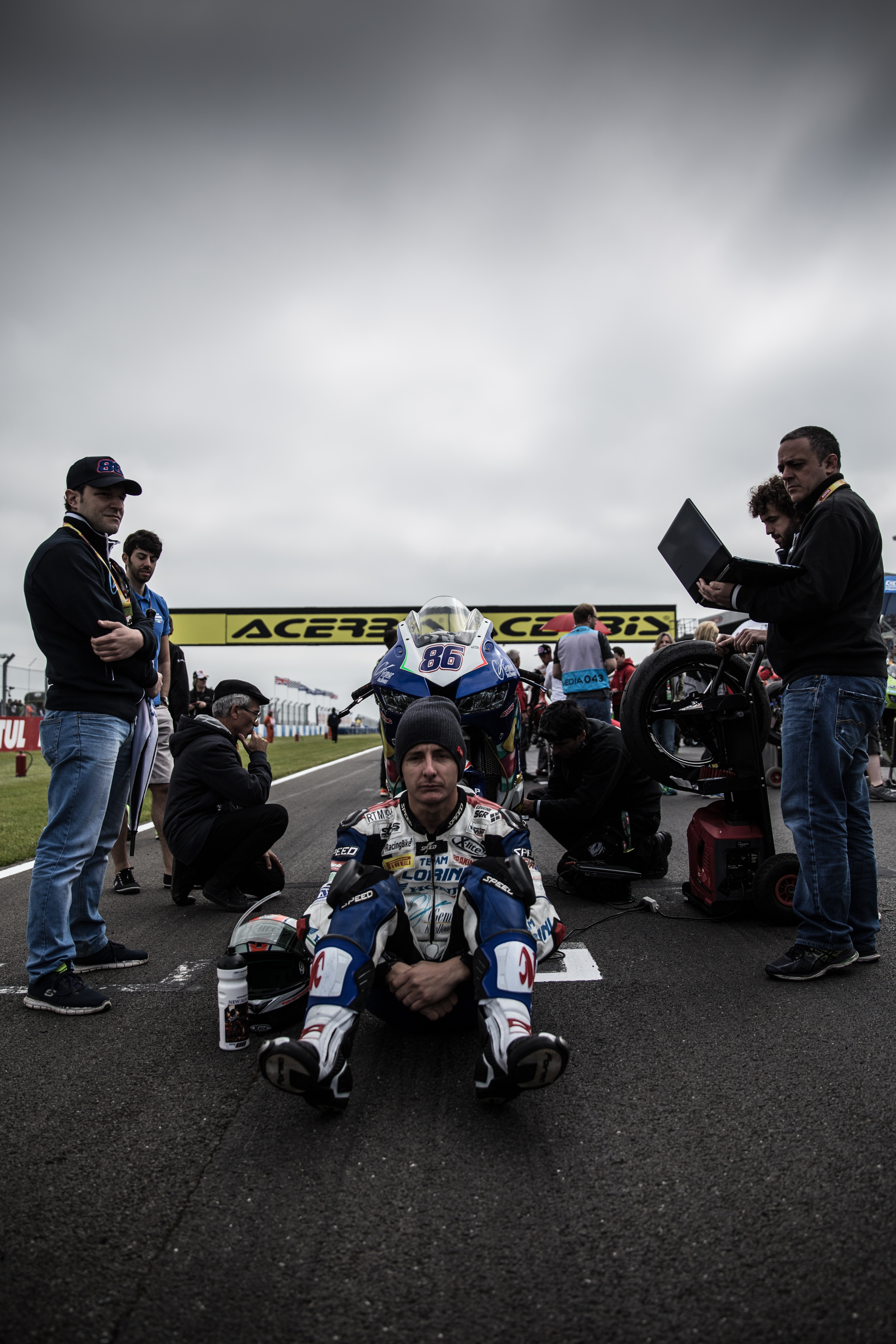
- Ayrton Badovini, World Supersport, Donington 2016
- Nationality: Italian
- Born: 31 May 1986 (age 40); Biella, Italy
- Current team: Team Pedercini Racing
- Bike number: 86
- Website: Ayrtonbadovini.com
Motorcycle racing career statistics
Superbike World Championship
Active years	2008–2009, 2011–2015, 2017
Manufacturers	Kawasaki, BMW, Ducati, Bimota
2017 championship position	21st (26 pts)
Starts / Wins / Podiums / Poles / F. laps / Points; 167 / 0 / 2 / 1 / 1 / 581
Supersport World Championship
Active years	2016, 2018–2019
Manufacturers	Honda, MV Agusta, Kawasaki
2019 championship position	10th (65 pts)
Starts / Wins / Podiums / Poles / F. laps / Points; 33 / 1 / 3 / 0 / 0 / 200

Ayrton Badovini (born 31 May 1986) is an Italian motorcycle racer. He has competed in the Italian Superbike Championship, the FIM Superstock 1000 Cup, where he was champion in 2010, the Superbike World Championship and the Supersport World Championship.

== Biography ==
Badovini began his motorcycle racing career in the early 2000s, participating in various national and international competitions. He worked his way up through the ranks of Italian racing.

== Career statistics ==
=== Career by year ===
- 2004 - 18th, Superstock European Championship, Ducati 999S
- 2005 - 12th, FIM Superstock 1000 Cup, MV Agusta
- 2006 - 4th, FIM Superstock 1000 Cup, MV Agusta
- 2007 - 9th, FIM Superstock 1000 Cup, MV Agusta
- 2009 - NC, FIM Superstock 1000 Cup, Aprilia
- 2010 - 1st, FIM Superstock 1000 Cup, BMW

=== Superstock European Championship ===
==== Races by year ====
(key) (Races in bold indicate pole position) (Races in italics indicate fastest lap)

Year	Bike	1	2	3	4	5	6	7	8	9	Pos	Pts
2003	Ducati	VAL; Ret	MNZ; Ret	OSC; 16	SIL; Ret	SMR; Ret	BRA; Ret	NED; 18	IMO; 13	MAG; 12	24th	7
2004	Ducati	VAL; Ret	SMR; Ret	MNZ; 14	OSC; 12	SIL; 12	BRA; 12	NED; 12	IMO; 13	MAG; Ret	18th	21

=== FIM Superstock 1000 Cup ===
==== Races by year ====
(key) (Races in bold indicate pole position) (Races in italics indicate fastest lap)

Year	Bike	1	2	3	4	5	6	7	8	9	10	11	Pos	Pts
2005	MV Agusta	VAL; 9	MNZ; Ret	SIL; 16	SMR; 12	BRN; 12	BRA; 7	NED; 5	LAU; 8	IMO; 14	MAG; Ret		12th	45
2006	MV Agusta	VAL; 3	MNZ; 3	SIL; 3	SMR; 2	BRN; 1	BRA; 3	NED; Ret	LAU; Ret	IMO; 5	MAG; Ret		4th	120
2007	MV Agusta	DON; Ret	VAL; Ret	NED; 31	MNZ; Ret	SIL; 9	SMR; Ret	BRN; Ret	BRA; 6	LAU; 7	ITA; 3	MAG; 1	9th	67
2009	Aprilia	VAL	NED	MNZ	SMR	DON	BRN	NŰR	IMO; DSQ	MAG; Ret	ALG		NC	0
2010	BMW	ALG; 1	VAL; 1	NED; 1	MNZ; 1	SMR; 1	BRN; 1	SIL; 1	NŰR; 1	IMO; 1	MAG; 2		1st	245

=== Superbike World Championship ===
In 2011 he moved over to WorldSBK

==== By season ====
Season	Motorcycle	Team	Race	Win	Pod	Pole	FLap	Pts	Plcd	WCh
2008	Kawasaki ZX-10R	Team Pedercini	28	0	0	0	0	24	24th	–
2009	Kawasaki ZX-10R	PSG-1 Corse	4	0	0	0	0	0	NC	–
2011	BMW S1000RR	BMW Motorrad Italia SBK Team	26	0	0	0	0	165	10th	–
2012	BMW S1000RR	BMW Motorrad Italia GoldBet	27	0	1	0	1	133	12th	–
2013	Ducati 1199 Panigale R	Team Ducati Alstare	24	0	1	1	0	130	12th	–
2014	Bimota BB3	Team Bimota Alstare	16	0	0	0	0	0	NC	–
2015	BMW S1000RR	BMW Motorrad Italia SBK Team	20	0	0	0	0	103	12th	–
2017	Kawasaki ZX-10RR	Grillini Racing Team	22	0	0	0	0	26	21st	–
Total			**167**	**0**	**2**	**1**	**1**	**581**		**0**

==== Races by year ====
(key) (Races in bold indicate pole position; races in italics indicate fastest lap)

Year	Bike	1		2		3		4		5		6		7		8		9		10		11		12		13		14		Pos.	Pts
Year	Bike	R1	R2	R1	R2	R1	R2	R1	R2	R1	R2	R1	R2	R1	R2	R1	R2	R1	R2	R1	R2	R1	R2	R1	R2	R1	R2	R1	R2	Pos.	Pts
2008	Kawasaki	QAT; 18	QAT; 17	AUS; Ret	AUS; 21	SPA; 17	SPA; 21	NED; 13	NED; 18	ITA; Ret	ITA; 9	USA; 17	USA; 12	GER; 17	GER; Ret	SMR; Ret	SMR; 17	CZE; 17	CZE; Ret	GBR; Ret	GBR; 21	EUR; 12	EUR; Ret	ITA; 15	ITA; Ret	FRA; 16	FRA; 17	POR; 11	POR; 16	24th	24
2009	Kawasaki	AUS; DNS	AUS; DNS	QAT; Ret	QAT; Ret	SPA; 17	SPA; Ret	NED	NED	ITA	ITA	RSA	RSA	USA	USA	SMR	SMR	GBR	GBR	CZE	CZE	GER	GER	ITA	ITA	FRA	FRA	POR	POR	NC	0
2011	BMW	AUS; 14	AUS; Ret	EUR; 13	EUR; 9	NED; 9	NED; 15	ITA; 11	ITA; 6	USA; 7	USA; 9	SMR; 8	SMR; 4	SPA; 8	SPA; 10	CZE; 6	CZE; 6	GBR; 10	GBR; 10	GER; 9	GER; 7	ITA; 9	ITA; 10	FRA; Ret	FRA; 8	POR; 13	POR; 9			10th	165
2012	BMW	AUS; Ret	AUS; Ret	ITA; 15	ITA; 15	NED; Ret	NED; 7	ITA; C	ITA; 10	EUR; 11	EUR; 6	USA; 14	USA; 13	SMR; 11	SMR; 5	SPA; Ret	SPA; 9	CZE; Ret	CZE; Ret	GBR; 3	GBR; Ret	RUS; 12	RUS; 8	GER; 9	GER; 9	POR; 9	POR; 6	FRA; 6	FRA; 9	12th	133
2013	Ducati	AUS; DNS	AUS; DNS	SPA; 10	SPA; 10	NED; 13	NED; 11	ITA; 11	ITA; 9	GBR; 11	GBR; Ret	POR; Ret	POR; 8	ITA; 8	ITA; 10	RUS; 3	RUS; C	GBR; 8	GBR; 8	**GER**; 9	**GER**; 7	TUR; Ret	TUR; DNS	USA; 9	USA; Ret	FRA; 9	FRA; 10	SPA; 13	SPA; Ret	12th	130
2014	Bimota	AUS	AUS	SPA; DSQ	SPA; DSQ	NED; DSQ	NED; DSQ	ITA; DSQ	ITA; DSQ	GBR; DSQ	GBR; DSQ	MAL; DSQ	MAL; DSQ	ITA; DSQ	ITA; DSQ	POR; DSQ	POR; DSQ	USA; DSQ	USA; DSQ	SPA	SPA	FRA	FRA	QAT	QAT					NC	0
2015	BMW	AUS	AUS	THA	THA	SPA; Ret	SPA; 9	NED; Ret	NED; 12	ITA; 6	ITA; 5	GBR; 5	GBR; 9	POR; 7	POR; 12	ITA; 7	ITA; 11	USA; Ret	USA; 6	MAL; DNS	MAL; DNS	SPA; 15	SPA; 14	FRA; 14	FRA; Ret	QAT; 11	QAT; 10			12th	103
2017	Kawasaki	AUS; 17	AUS; Ret	THA; Ret	THA; 14	SPA; Ret	SPA; 17	NED; 15	NED; 16	ITA; 15	ITA; Ret	GBR; 16	GBR; 14	ITA; 13	ITA; 11	USA; 16	USA; Ret	GER; 16	GER; 18	POR; 12	POR; 9	FRA; DNS	FRA; 15	SPA; Ret	SPA; DNS	QAT	QAT			21st	26

=== Supersport World Championship ===
==== Races by year ====
(key)

Year	Bike	1	2	3	4	5	6	7	8	9	10	11	12	Pos.	Pts
2016	Honda	AUS	THA	SPA	NED; 7	ITA; 8	MAL; 1	GBR; 9	ITA; Ret	GER; 13	FRA; 3	SPA; 8	QAT; 6	6th	86
2018	MV Agusta	AUS; 9	THA; 15	SPA; Ret	NED; 12	ITA; Ret	GBR; 7	CZE; Ret	ITA; 10	POR; 8	FRA; 12	ARG; 11	QAT; 11	11th	49
2019	Kawasaki	AUS; 15	THA; Ret	SPA; Ret	NED; 11	ITA; 5	SPA; 13	ITA; Ret	GBR; 10	POR; 5	FRA; 3	ARG; 10	QAT; 10	10th	65
