= Nico Vivarelli =

Italian motorcycle racer

- Nationality: Italian
- Born: 30 August 1986 (age 40); Grosseto, Italy

Nico Vivarelli (born 30 August 1986) is a Grand Prix motorcycle racer from Italy.

== Career statistics ==
- 2009 - 13th, FIM Superstock 1000 Cup, Honda CBR1000RR, KTM
- 2010 - 20th, FIM Superstock 1000 Cup, KTM
- 2011 - NC, FIM Superstock 1000 Cup, Kawasaki ZX-10R

=== CIV Championship (Campionato Italiano Velocita) ===
==== Races by year ====
(key) (Races in bold indicate pole position; races in italics indicate fastest lap)

| Year | Class | Bike | 1 | 2 | 3 | 4 | 5 | Pos | Pts |
|---|---|---|---|---|---|---|---|---|---|
| 2003 | 125cc | Honda | MIS1; 11 | MUG1; 15 | MIS1; 13 | MUG2; 14 | VAL | 18th | 11 |

=== Grand Prix motorcycle racing ===
==== By season ====
| Season | Class | Motorcycle | Team | Race | Win | Podium | Pole | FLap | Pts | Plcd |
|---|---|---|---|---|---|---|---|---|---|---|
| 2005 | 125cc | Honda | Racing Service | 1 | 0 | 0 | 0 | 0 | 0 | NC |
| 2006 | 125cc | Honda | Racing Service | 1 | 0 | 0 | 0 | 0 | 0 | NC |
| 2006 | 125cc | Malaguti | Malaguti Ajo Corse | 1 | 0 | 0 | 0 | 0 | 0 | NC |
| Total | | | | **3** | **0** | **0** | **0** | **0** | **0** | |

==== Races by year ====
(key)

| Year | Class | Bike | 1 | 2 | 3 | 4 | 5 | 6 | 7 | 8 | 9 | 10 | 11 | 12 | 13 | 14 | 15 | 16 | Pos. | Pts |
|---|---|---|---|---|---|---|---|---|---|---|---|---|---|---|---|---|---|---|---|---|
| 2005 | 125cc | Honda | SPA | POR | CHN | FRA | ITA; Ret | CAT | NED | GBR | GER | CZE | JPN | MAL | QAT | AUS | TUR | VAL | NC | 0 |
| 2006 | 125cc | Malaguti | SPA | QAT | TUR | CHN | FRA | ITA; Ret | CAT | NED | GBR | GER | CZE | MAL | AUS | JPN | POR | VAL; 35 | NC | 0 |

=== FIM Superstock 1000 Cup ===
==== Races by year ====
(key) (Races in bold indicate pole position) (Races in italics indicate fastest lap)

| Year | Bike | 1 | 2 | 3 | 4 | 5 | 6 | 7 | 8 | 9 | 10 | Pos | Pts |
|---|---|---|---|---|---|---|---|---|---|---|---|---|---|
| 2009 | Honda/KTM | VAL; WD | NED; 31 | MNZ; 24 | SMR; 19 | DON; Ret | BRN; 20 | NŰR; 20 | IMO; 21 | MAG; 27 | ALG; 21 | NC | 0 |
| 2010 | KTM | ALG; 14 | VAL; Ret | NED; 15 | MNZ; 13 | SMR; NC | BRN; 12 | SIL; 18 | NŰR; 19 | IMO; 10 | MAG; Ret | 20th | 16 |
| 2011 | Kawasaki | NED; 18 | MNZ; 19 | SMR; 18 | ARA; DNS | BRN | SIL | NŰR | IMO | MAG | ALG | NC | 0 |
