= Maxime Berger =

French motorcycle racer (1989–2017)

Maxime Berger (27 June 1989 – 30 September 2017) was a French motorcycle racer, he competed in the FIM Superstock 1000 Cup in 2009 and in 2010.

== Career statistics ==
- 2005 - 3rd, European Superstock 600 Championship, Honda CBR600RR
- 2007 - 1st, European Superstock 600 Championship, Yamaha YZF-R6
- 2008 - 2nd, FIM Superstock 1000 Cup, Honda CBR1000RR
- 2009 - 3rd, FIM Superstock 1000 Cup, Honda
- 2010 - 2nd, FIM Superstock 1000 Cup, Honda

=== European Superstock 600 ===
==== Races by year ====
(key) (Races in bold indicate pole position, races in italics indicate fastest lap)

Year	Bike	1	2	3	4	5	6	7	8	9	10	11	12	Pos	Pts
2005	Honda	VAL; 6	MNZ; 3	SIL; 3	MIS; DSQ	BRN; Ret	BRA; 3	ASS; 14	LAU; 1	IMO; 2	MAG; 3			3rd	121
2007	Yamaha	DON; 5	SPA; 1	ASS; 3	MNZ; 6	SIL; C	MIS; 1	BRN; 3	BRA; 1	BRA; 1	LAU; 6	VAL; 3	MAG; 1	1st	204

=== FIM Superstock 1000 Cup ===
==== Races by year ====
(key) (Races in bold indicate pole position) (Races in italics indicate fastest lap)

Year	Bike	1	2	3	4	5	6	7	8	9	10	Pos	Pts
2008	Honda	VAL; 7	NED; 1	MNZ; Ret	NŰR; 7	SMR; 3	BRN; 1	BRA; 1	DON; 6	MAG; 11	ALG; 3	2nd	140
2009	Honda	VAL; 3	NED; 1	MNZ; Ret	SMR; 1	DON; 3	BRN; Ret	NŰR; 2	IMO; Ret	MAG; 1	ALG; 5	3rd	138
2010	Honda	ALG; 2	VAL; Ret	NED; 2	MNZ; 10	SMR; 2	BRN; Ret	SIL; 2	NŰR; 2	IMO; 3	MAG; 1	2nd	147

=== FIM Endurance World Championship ===
==== By team ====
Year	Team	Bike	Rider	TC
2013	(France) GMT94	Yamaha YZF-R1	(Spain) David Checa (France) Kenny Foray (France) Matthieu Lagrive (France) Maxime Berger	2nd
