= Pere Tutusaus =

Spanish motorcycle racer

Pere Tutusaus Vila
- Nationality: Spanish
- Born: 19 October 1990 (age 36); Igualada (Spain)

Pere Tutusaus Vila is a Grand Prix motorcycle racer from Spain.

== Career statistics ==
- 2009 - NC, FIM Superstock 1000 Cup, KTM
- 2010 - 16th, FIM Superstock 1000 Cup, KTM
- 2011 - NC, FIM Superstock 1000 Cup, Kawasaki ZX-10R
- 2013 - NC, FIM Superstock 1000 Cup, Kawasaki ZX-10R

=== Grand Prix motorcycle racing ===
==== By season ====
Season	Class	Motorcycle	Team	Number	Race	Win	Podium	Pole	FLap	Pts	Plcd
2006	125cc	Derbi	RACC Derbi	30	1	0	0	0	0	0	NC
2007	125cc	Aprilia	FMCV - Team Machado	30	4	0	0	0	0	0	NC
2008	125cc	Aprilia	Bancaja Aspar Team	30	12	0	0	0	0	9	26th
Total					**17**	**0**	**0**	**0**	**0**	**9**	

==== Races by year ====
Year	Class	Bike	1	2	3	4	5	6	7	8	9	10	11	12	13	14	15	16	17	Pos	Points
2006	125cc	Derbi	SPA	QAT	TUR	CHN	FRA	ITA	CAT	NED	GBR	GER	CZE	MAL	AUS	JPN	POR	VAL; 26		NC	0
2007	125cc	Aprilia	QAT	SPA; 16	TUR	CHN	FRA	ITA	CAT; 18	GBR	NED	GER	CZE	RSM	POR; Ret	JPN	AUS	MAL	VAL; 27	NC	0
2008	125cc	Aprilia	QAT; 20	SPA; 19	POR; 22	CHN; 15	FRA; 12	ITA; 21	CAT; 19	GBR; 22	NED; 21	GER; 12	CZE; 20	RSM	INP	JPN	AUS	MAL	VAL; Ret	26th	9

=== FIM Superstock 1000 Cup ===
==== Races by year ====
(key) (Races in bold indicate pole position) (Races in italics indicate fastest lap)

Year	Bike	1	2	3	4	5	6	7	8	9	10	Pos	Pts
2009	KTM	VAL; 20	NED; 30	MNZ; 27	SMR; 33	DON	BRN; 17	NŰR; Ret	IMO; 20	MAG; 19	ALG; 18	NC	0
2010	KTM	ALG; 11	VAL; 7	NED; 10	MNZ; 11	SMR; 16	BRN; Ret	SIL; 15	NŰR; 18	IMO; 12	MAG; 13	16th	33
2011	Kawasaki	NED	MNZ	SMR	ARA; 23	BRN	SIL	NŰR	IMO	MAG	ALG	NC	0
2013	Kawasaki	ARA	NED	MNZ	ALG	IMO	SIL	SIL	NŰR	MAG	JER; 25	NC	0
