= Michele Conti (motorcyclist) =

Italian motorcycle racer

- Nationality: Italian
- Born: 3 July 1983 (age 43); Lecco, Italy
Motorcycle racing career statistics
125cc World Championship
Active years	2001, 2003, 2005–2006
Manufacturers	Honda
Starts / Wins / Podiums / Poles / F. laps / Points; 19 / 0 / 0 / 0 / 0 / 5
Supersport World Championship
Active years	2011
Manufacturers	Honda
Starts / Wins / Podiums / Poles / F. laps / Points; 1 / 0 / 0 / 0 / 0 / 0

Michele Giovanni Conti (born 3 July 1983) is an Italian motorcycle racer. He was the European 125cc champion in 2005.

== Career statistics ==
=== CIV 125cc Championship ===
==== Races by year ====
(key) (Races in bold indicate pole position; races in italics indicate fastest lap)

Year	Bike	1	2	3	4	5	Pos	Pts
2001	Honda	MIS1; 14	MON; 7	VAL; 17	MIS2; 12	MIS3; 16	15th	15

=== CIV Championship (Campionato Italiano Velocita) ===
==== Races by year ====
(key) (Races in bold indicate pole position; races in italics indicate fastest lap)

Year	Class	Bike	1	2	3	4	5	6	Pos	Pts
2002	125cc	Aprilia	IMO; 3	VAL; Ret	MUG; 3	MIS1; Ret	MIS2		5th	32
2003	125cc	Honda	MIS1; 7	MUG1; 1	MIS1; 21	MUG2; Ret	VAL; 10		6th	40
2004	125cc	Aprilia	MUG; 5	IMO; Ret	VAL1; 4	MIS; 18	VAL2; 10		8th	30
2005	125cc	Honda	VAL; 2	MON; 1	IMO; 2	MIS1	MUG	MIS2; 4	3rd	78

=== Grand Prix motorcycle racing ===
==== By season ====
Season	Class	Motorcycle	Team	Race	Win	Podium	Pole	FLap	Pts	Plcd
2001	125cc	Honda	BNT Racing	1	0	0	0	0	0	NC
2003	125cc	Honda	BNT Racing	1	0	0	0	0	0	NC
2005	125cc	Honda	Kuja Racing	1	0	0	0	0	5	30th
2006	125cc	Honda	Valsir Seedorf Racing	16	0	0	0	0	0	NC
Total				**19**	**0**	**0**	**0**	**0**	**5**	

==== Races by year ====
(key)

Year	Class	Bike	1	2	3	4	5	6	7	8	9	10	11	12	13	14	15	16	Pos.	Pts
2001	125cc	Honda	JPN	RSA	SPA	FRA	ITA; 22	CAT	NED	GBR	GER	CZE	POR	VAL	PAC	AUS	MAL	BRA	NC	0
2003	125cc	Honda	JPN	RSA	SPA	FRA	ITA; 22	CAT	NED	GBR	GER	CZE	POR	BRA	PAC	MAL	AUS	VAL	NC	0
2005	125cc	Honda	SPA	POR	CHN	FRA	ITA; 11	CAT	NED	GBR	GER	CZE	JPN	MAL	QAT	AUS	TUR	VAL	30th	5
2006	125cc	Honda	SPA; 29	QAT; 28	TUR; 23	CHN; 18	FRA; Ret	ITA; 29	CAT; Ret	NED; 20	GBR; 25	GER; 26	CZE; 26	MAL; 21	AUS; 18	JPN; 28	POR; 21	VAL; 23	NC	0

=== Supersport World Championship ===
==== Races by year ====
(key)

Year	Bike	1	2	3	4	5	6	7	8	9	10	11	12	Pos.	Pts
2011	Honda	AUS	EUR	NED	ITA	SMR	SPA	CZE; 18	GBR	GER	ITA	FRA	POR	NC	0
