= Robbin Harms =

Danish motorcycle racer

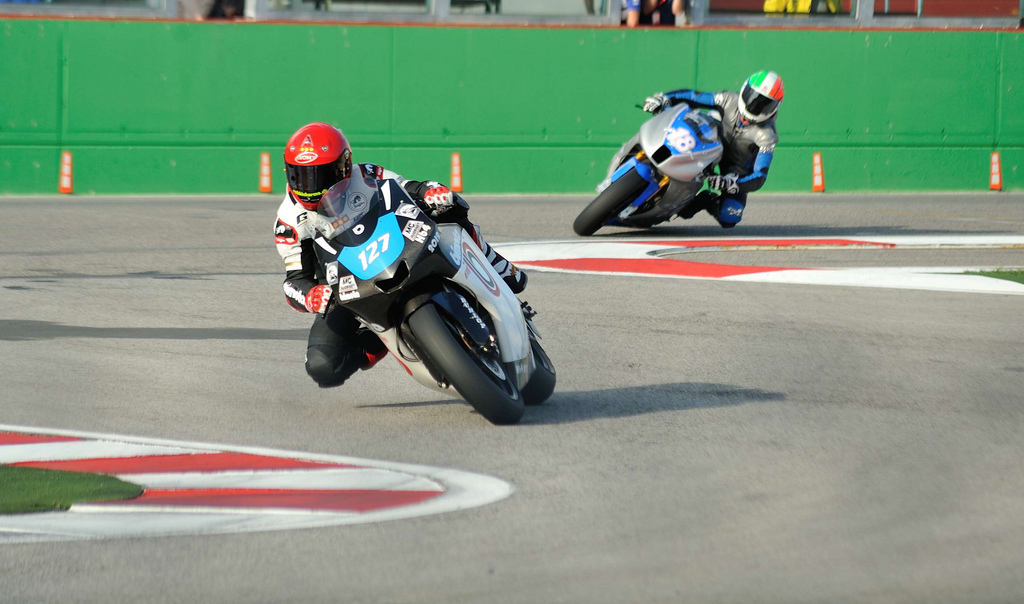
- Harms in 2012
- Nationality: Danish
- Born: 9 June 1981 (age 45)
Motorcycle racing career statistics
Grand Prix motorcycle racing
Active years	1999, 2002–2004
First race	1999 Australian 125cc Grand Prix
Last race	2004 Portuguese 125cc Grand Prix
Starts / Wins / Podiums / Poles / F. laps / Points; 23 / 0 / 0 / 0 / 0 / 16
Supersport World Championship
Active years	2005–2011
Manufacturers	Honda
Starts / Wins / Podiums / Poles / F. laps / Points; 75 / 0 / 4 / 0 / 2 / 492

Robbin Harms (born 9 June 1981 in Copenhagen) is a Danish motorcycle racer.

== Career ==
=== 125cc ===
Harms first competed in the 125cc class in 1999 for Aprilia, where he scored points in the season finale in Argentina.

Harms returned to the category in 2002, taking part in the Czech Grand Prix with a 23rd-place finish. His next seasons were in 2003 and 2004, in which he scored points in both.

=== Supersport ===
Harms would race in the Supersport World Championship afterwards, from 2005 to 2011, where he scored a handful of podiums, including two-second places in the 2007 season.

=== British Superbikes ===
Harms is currently a rider in the British Superbike Championship for Honda but has not been announced on the 2014 entry list. He first competed in the 2012 season where he finished 22nd in the championship with 24 points, with a best finish of ninth in the second race at TT Circuit Assen.

== Career statistics ==
=== Grand Prix motorcycle racing ===
==== Races by year ====
(key)

Year	Class	Bike	1	2	3	4	5	6	7	8	9	10	11	12	13	14	15	16	Pos.	Pts
1999	125cc	Aprilia	MAL	JPN	SPA	FRA	ITA	CAT	NED	GBR	GER	CZE	IMO	VAL	AUS; 22	RSA; Ret	BRA; 22	ARG; 13	32nd	3
2002	125cc	Honda	JPN	RSA	SPA	FRA	ITA	CAT	NED	GBR	GER	CZE; 23	POR	BRA	PAC	MAL	AUS	VAL	NC	0
2003	125cc	Aprilia	JPN	RSA	SPA	FRA	ITA; 25	CAT	NED; DSQ	GBR	GER; 16	CZE; 19	POR; Ret	BRA; 23	PAC; 22	MAL; 21	AUS; 10	VAL; 14	26th	8
2004	125cc	Honda	RSA; 18	SPA; Ret	FRA; Ret	ITA; Ret	CAT	NED	BRA	GER; 19	GBR; 17	CZE; 11	POR; Ret	JPN; DNS	QAT	MAL	AUS	VAL	30th	5

=== Supersport World Championship ===
==== Races by year ====
Year	Bike	1	2	3	4	5	6	7	8	9	10	11	12	13	14	Pos.	Pts
2005	Honda	QAT	AUS	SPA; Ret	ITA; Ret	EUR; 17	SMR; 11	CZE; 4	GBR; 13	NED; 6	GER; 13	ITA; Ret	FRA; DNS			13th	34
2006	Honda	QAT; 6	AUS; 5	SPA; 5	ITA; 2	EUR; 5	SMR; 5	CZE; Ret	GBR; 4	NED; 9	GER; 4	ITA; Ret	FRA; 6			5th	117
2007	Honda	QAT; 6	AUS; 7	EUR; 2	SPA; DNS	NED; DNS	ITA; Ret	GBR; 2	SMR; 5	CZE; Ret	GBR; 4	GER; DNS	ITA	FRA		7th	83
2008	Honda	QAT; 7	AUS; 3	SPA; Ret	NED; 13	ITA; 5	GER; Ret	SMR; 5	CZE; Ret	GBR; Ret	EUR; 6	ITA; 6	FRA; 15	POR; Ret		9th	71
2009	Honda	AUS; 15	QAT; 5	SPA; 12	NED; 9	ITA; DNS	RSA	USA; Ret	SMR; Ret	GBR; Ret	CZE; Ret	GER; 9	ITA; DNS	FRA	POR	17th	30
2010	Honda	AUS; 7	POR; 7	SPA; 9	NED; 6	ITA; Ret	RSA; 8	USA; 8	SMR; 6	CZE; 6	GBR; 5	GER; 11	ITA; Ret	FRA; 5		7th	98
2011	Honda	AUS; 5	EUR; 4	NED; 4	ITA; 10	SMR; 8	SPA; 8	CZE; Ret	GBR; Ret	GER; Ret	ITA; Ret	FRA; DNS	POR; Ret			12th	59

=== British Superbike Championship ===
==== By year ====
(key) (Races in bold indicate pole position; races in italics indicate fastest lap)

Year	Make	1		2		3			4		5		6			7			8			9			10		11		12			Pos	Pts
Year	Make	R1	R2	R1	R2	R1	R2	R3	R1	R2	R1	R2	R1	R2	R3	R1	R2	R3	R1	R2	R3	R1	R2	R3	R1	R2	R1	R2	R1	R2	R3	Pos	Pts
2012	Honda	BHI	BHI; C	THR	THR	OUL	OUL	OUL	SNE	SNE	KNO	KNO	OUL	OUL	OUL	BHGP	BHGP		CAD; 23	CAD; 22		DON; 15	DON; Ret		ASS; 10	ASS; 9	SIL; 11	SIL; Ret	BHGP; Ret	BHGP; 12	BHGP; Ret	22nd	23

Year	Make	1			2			3			4			5			6			7			8			9			10			11			12			Pos	Pts
Year	Make	R1	R2	R3	R1	R2	R3	R1	R2	R3	R1	R2	R3	R1	R2	R3	R1	R2	R3	R1	R2	R3	R1	R2	R3	R1	R2	R3	R1	R2	R3	R1	R2	R3	R1	R2	R3	Pos	Pts
2014	BMW	BHI	BHI		OUL	OUL		SNE	SNE		KNO	KNO		BHGP	BHGP		THR	THR		OUL	OUL	OUL	CAD	CAD		DON	DON		ASS	ASS		SIL; Ret	SIL; Ret		BHGP; 16	BHGP; Ret	BHGP; Ret	NC	0

Year	Make	1		2		3			4		5		6			7		8			9			10		11		12			Pos	Pts
Year	Make	R1	R2	R1	R2	R1	R2	R3	R1	R2	R1	R2	R1	R2	R3	R1	R2	R1	R2	R3	R1	R2	R3	R1	R2	R1	R2	R1	R2	R3	Pos	Pts
2015	BMW/Kawasaki	DON; 12	DON; 16	BHI; Ret	BHI; Ret	OUL; 19	OUL; 21		SNE	SNE	KNO	KNO	BHGP	BHGP		THR	THR	CAD	CAD		OUL	OUL	OUL	ASS	ASS	SIL; Ret	SIL; DNS	BHGP; 17	BHGP; Ret	BHGP; 15	30th	5
