= 2011 Supersport World Championship =

2011 Supersport World Championship
| Previous: | 2010 | Next: | 2012 |
Support series: Superbike World Championship; FIM Superstock 1000 Cup; European Superstock 600 Championship; European Junior Cup

The 2011 Supersport World Championship was the thirteenth FIM Supersport World Championship season—the fifteenth taking into account the two held under the name of Supersport World Series. The season began on 27 February at Phillip Island and ended on 16 October at Portimão after twelve rounds.

With reigning champion Kenan Sofuoğlu moving to Moto2, Eugene Laverty and Joan Lascorz moving up to the Superbike World Championship, Chaz Davies emerged as the season winner, despite his bad start in the first round.

== Race calendar and results ==
The provisional race schedule was publicly announced by FIM on 7 October 2010 with eleven confirmed rounds and two other rounds pending confirmation. Having been announced as a venue from 2011 onwards in May 2010, Motorland Aragon replaced Kyalami on the calendar, while Donington Park returned to the championship, hosting the European round. Imola was confirmed in November 2010, but Miller Motorsports Park was dropped to finalise a 12-round calendar.

| Round | Country | Circuit | Date | Pole position | Fastest lap | Winning rider | Winning team | Report |
|---|---|---|---|---|---|---|---|---|
| 1 | Australia | Phillip Island Grand Prix Circuit | 27 February | (Spain) David Salom | (France) Fabien Foret | (Italy) Luca Scassa | Yamaha ParkinGO Team | Report |
| 2 | United Kingdom | Donington Park | 27 March | (Italy) Luca Scassa | (United Kingdom) Sam Lowes | (Italy) Luca Scassa | Yamaha ParkinGO Team | Report |
| 3 | Netherlands | TT Circuit Assen | 17 April | (Italy) Luca Scassa | (Italy) Luca Scassa | (United Kingdom) Chaz Davies | Yamaha ParkinGO Team | Report |
| 4 | Italy | Autodromo Nazionale Monza | 8 May | (United Kingdom) Chaz Davies | (United Kingdom) Chaz Davies | (United Kingdom) Chaz Davies | Yamaha ParkinGO Team | Report |
| 5 | San Marino | Misano World Circuit | 12 June | (United Kingdom) Sam Lowes | (France) Fabien Foret | (Australia) Broc Parkes | Kawasaki Motocard.com | Report |
| 6 | Spain | Motorland Aragon | 19 June | (Australia) Broc Parkes | (United Kingdom) Sam Lowes | (United Kingdom) Chaz Davies | Yamaha ParkinGO Team | Report |
| 7 | Czech Republic | Masaryk Circuit | 10 July | (France) Fabien Foret | (United Kingdom) Gino Rea | (United Kingdom) Gino Rea | Step Racing Team | Report |
| 8 | United Kingdom | Silverstone Circuit | 31 July | (Spain) David Salom | (Denmark) Robbin Harms | (United Kingdom) Chaz Davies | Yamaha ParkinGO Team | Report |
| 9 | Germany | Nürburgring | 4 September | (France) Fabien Foret | (United Kingdom) James Ellison | (United Kingdom) Chaz Davies | Yamaha ParkinGO Team | Report |
| 10 | Italy | Autodromo Enzo e Dino Ferrari | 25 September | (Australia) Broc Parkes | (France) Fabien Foret | (France) Fabien Foret | Hannspree Ten Kate Honda | Report |
| 11 | France | Circuit de Nevers Magny-Cours | 2 October | (Australia) Broc Parkes | (Italy) Massimo Roccoli | (Italy) Luca Scassa | Yamaha ParkinGO Team | Report |
| 12 | Portugal | Autódromo Internacional do Algarve | 16 October | (Spain) David Salom | (United Kingdom) James Ellison | (United Kingdom) Chaz Davies | Yamaha ParkinGO Team | Report |

== Championship standings ==
=== Riders' standings ===
| Pos. | Rider | Bike | AUS (Australia) | EUR (Europe) | NED (Netherlands) | ITA (Italy) | SMR (San Marino) | SPA (Spain) | CZE (Czech Republic) | GBR (United Kingdom) | GER (Germany) | ITA (Italy) | FRA (France) | POR (Portugal) | Pts |
|---|---|---|---|---|---|---|---|---|---|---|---|---|---|---|---|
| 1 | (United Kingdom) Chaz Davies | Yamaha | 18 | 2 | 1 | **1** | 6 | 1 | 3 | 1 | 1 | Ret | 6 | 1 | 206 |
| 2 | (Spain) David Salom | Kawasaki | **4** | 6 | 5 | 8 | 4 | 3 | 4 | **2** | 8 | 5 | 4 | **2** | 156 |
| 3 | (France) Fabien Foret | Honda | Ret | DNS | 2 | 3 | 2 | 7 | **2** | 3 | **6** | 1 | 8 | 12 | 148 |
| 4 | (Australia) Broc Parkes | Kawasaki | 2 | 5 | 3 | 4 | 1 | **Ret** | Ret | 6 | 7 | **3** | **3** | Ret | 136 |
| 5 | (Italy) Luca Scassa | Yamaha | 1 | **1** | **Ret** | 2 | EX | Ret | 7 | 12 | 4 | Ret | 1 | 4 | 134 |
| 6 | (United Kingdom) Sam Lowes | Honda | 3 | Ret | DNS | 5 | **3** | 2 | 6 | Ret | 3 | 2 | 2 | Ret | 129 |
| 7 | (United Kingdom) James Ellison | Honda | 6 | Ret | 7 | 16 | 7 | Ret | 8 | 10 | 2 | 6 | 5 | 3 | 99 |
| 8 | (France) Florian Marino | Honda | 7 | 8 | Ret | 7 | 11 | 10 | 9 | 9 | 9 | 4 | 9 | 5 | 89 |
| 9 | (Italy) Roberto Tamburini | Yamaha | 20 | 12 | DSQ | 6 | 9 | 5 | 5 | 4 | 11 | Ret | 7 | 6 | 80 |
| 10 | (Italy) Massimo Roccoli | Kawasaki | Ret | 7 | 6 | 9 | Ret | 4 | 15 | 5 | 5 | Ret | Ret | 7 | 71 |
| 11 | (United Kingdom) Gino Rea | Honda | Ret | 3 | 16 | Ret | 10 | 6 | 1 | 11 | Ret | 11 | 22 | 14 | 69 |
| 12 | (Denmark) Robbin Harms | Honda | 5 | 4 | 4 | 10 | 8 | 8 | Ret | Ret | Ret | Ret | DNS | Ret | 59 |
| 13 | (Portugal) Miguel Praia | Honda | Ret | 11 | 8 | Ret | 12 | 9 | Ret | 8 | Ret | 8 | 13 | 8 | 51 |
| 14 | (Italy) Vittorio Iannuzzo | Kawasaki | 8 | 9 | Ret | Ret | Ret | Ret | 10 | 15 | 12 | 7 | 12 | 11 | 44 |
| 15 | (Hungary) Balázs Németh | Honda | 14 | 14 | 10 | 14 | 18 | 12 | | 7 | 10 | Ret | 11 | 10 | 42 |
| 16 | (Sweden) Alexander Lundh | Honda | 9 | 10 | DNS | 19 | 15 | 16 | 12 | 13 | 13 | Ret | 14 | 13 | 29 |
| 17 | (Italy) Danilo Dell'Omo | Triumph | 10 | Ret | 14 | 11 | Ret | 14 | 11 | Ret | 16 | 10 | Ret | Ret | 26 |
| 18 | (South Africa) Ronan Quarmby | Triumph | 11 | Ret | Ret | 17 | 21 | Ret | 16 | 14 | 15 | Ret | 10 | Ret | 14 |
| 19 | (Hungary) Imre Tóth | Honda | 15 | 16 | 11 | Ret | 20 | 15 | 13 | 17 | 14 | 15 | 20 | Ret | 13 |
| 20 | (Ukraine) Vladimir Ivanov | Honda | 16 | Ret | 9 | Ret | 16 | 11 | Ret | 16 | 21 | | | | 12 |
| 21 | (Poland) Paweł Szkopek | Honda | Ret | Ret | 12 | Ret | Ret | 13 | Ret | Ret | Ret | 12 | 17 | 15 | 12 |
| 22 | (Italy) Ilario Dionisi | Honda | | | | | 5 | | | | | | | | 11 |
| 23 | (Czech Republic) Ondřej Ježek | Honda | 12 | 13 | Ret | DSQ | Ret | Ret | Ret | 18 | 17 | 14 | 16 | DNS | 9 |
| 24 | (Russia) Vladimir Leonov | Yamaha | | | | | 17 | | | | | | | 9 | 7 |
| 25 | (Italy) Stefano Cruciani | Kawasaki | | | | | 24 | | | | | 9 | | | 7 |
| 26 | (Switzerland) Bastien Chesaux | Honda | 13 | Ret | 13 | | | | | 20 | Ret | Ret | Ret | 16 | 6 |
| 27 | (Italy) Mirko Giansanti | Kawasaki | | | | 12 | Ret | | Ret | | | | | | 4 |
| 28 | (Slovenia) Marko Jerman | Triumph | 17 | 15 | DNS | 13 | 19 | Ret | Ret | 21 | 20 | Ret | 21 | 18 | 4 |
| 29 | (Czech Republic) Patrik Vostárek | Honda | | | | | | | Ret | | 19 | 13 | 18 | | 3 |
| 30 | (Italy) Alessio Velini | Honda | | | | | 13 | | | | | | | | 3 |
| 31 | (Italy) Luca Marconi | Yamaha | 19 | Ret | Ret | 15 | Ret | Ret | 14 | Ret | DNS | DNS | | 17 | 3 |
| 32 | (Switzerland) Roman Stamm | Honda | | | | | 14 | 17 | 17 | | | | | | 2 |
| 33 | (France) Louis Bulle | Yamaha | | | | | | | | | | | 15 | | 1 |
| 34 | (Romania) Robert Mureșan | Honda | | DNS | 15 | Ret | | | | | | | | | 1 |
| | (Romania) Cătălin Cazacu | Honda | | | | | | | 21 | | 23 | 16 | 23 | | 0 |
| | (Australia) Mitchell Pirotta | Honda | Ret | 17 | 18 | 18 | DNS | 19 | 20 | 22 | 25 | Ret | DNQ | | 0 |
| | (Austria) Yves Polzer | Yamaha | | | 17 | 20 | Ret | 18 | Ret | 23 | Ret | DNS | | | 0 |
| | (Russia) Eduard Blokhin | Yamaha | | DNQ | DNQ | 21 | Ret | 20 | 23 | 24 | 26 | 17 | 25 | 24 | 0 |
| | (Italy) Michele Conti | Honda | | | | | | | 18 | | | | | | 0 |
| | (Germany) Marc Moser | Yamaha | | | | | | | | | 18 | | | | 0 |
| | (Ukraine) Konstantin Pisarev | Honda | | | | | | | 19 | | | | | 23 | 0 |
| | (United Kingdom) Luke Stapleford | Kawasaki | | | | | | | | 19 | | | | Ret | 0 |
| | (Italy) Danilo Marrancone | Yamaha | | | | | | | | | | | 19 | | 0 |
| | (Austria) Günther Knobloch | Yamaha | | | | | | | | | | | | 19 | 0 |
| | (Italy) Gianluca Vizziello | Honda | | | | | | | | | | | | 20 | 0 |
| | (Austria) David Linortner | Yamaha | | | | | | | | | | | | 21 | 0 |
| | (Switzerland) Thomas Caiani | Honda | | | | | | | | | | | 24 | 22 | 0 |
| | (Russia) Valery Yurchenko | Yamaha | | | | 22 | Ret | | Ret | | | | | | 0 |
| | (Netherlands) Kervin Bos | Yamaha | | | Ret | | | | | | 22 | | | | 0 |
| | (Italy) Iuri Vigilucci | Yamaha | | | | | 22 | | | | | | | | 0 |
| | (Hungary) János Chrobák | Honda | | | | | | | 22 | | | | | | 0 |
| | (Russia) Oleg Pozdneev | Yamaha | | DNQ | DNQ | Ret | 23 | DNQ | 24 | DNQ | 24 | DNQ | 26 | DNQ | 0 |
| | (Italy) Giovanni Altomonte | Honda | | | | 23 | | | | | | | | | 0 |
| | (Hungary) Ferenc Kurucz | Yamaha | | | | | | | 25 | | | | | | 0 |
| | (Australia) Christian Casella | Triumph | | | | | | | | NC | | | | | 0 |
| | (Republic of Ireland) Jack Kennedy | Yamaha | | Ret | | | | | | | | | | | 0 |
| | (Netherlands) Jos van der Aa | Yamaha | | | Ret | | | | | | | | | | 0 |
| | (Italy) William Marconi | Yamaha | | | | | Ret | | | | | | | | 0 |
| | (Finland) Pauli Pekkanen | Triumph | | | | | | | | | | | Ret | | 0 |
| | (Germany) Jesco Günther | Yamaha | | | | | | | | | | | | Ret | 0 |
| | (Italy) Giuliano Rovelli | Yamaha | | | | | DNS | | | | | | | | 0 |
| | (Slovenia) Boštjan Skubic | Yamaha | | | | | | | DNS | | | | | | 0 |
| | (Italy) Fabio Menghi | Yamaha | | | | | | | | | | DNS | | | 0 |
| | (United Kingdom) Martin Jessopp | Honda | | | | | | | | | | | DNS | | 0 |
| Pos. | Rider | Bike | AUS (Australia) | EUR (Europe) | NED (Netherlands) | ITA (Italy) | SMR (San Marino) | SPA (Spain) | CZE (Czech Republic) | GBR (United Kingdom) | GER (Germany) | ITA (Italy) | FRA (France) | POR (Portugal) | Pts |

| Colour | Result |
|---|---|
| Gold | Winner |
| Silver | Second place |
| Bronze | Third place |
| Green | Points classification |
| Blue | Non-points classification |
| Blue | Non-classified finish (NC) |
| Purple | Retired, not classified (Ret) |
| Red | Did not qualify (DNQ) |
| Red | Did not pre-qualify (DNPQ) |
| Black | Disqualified (DSQ) |
| White | Did not start (DNS) |
| White | Withdrew (WD) |
| White | Race cancelled (C) |
| Blank | Did not practice (DNP) |
| Blank | Did not arrive (DNA) |
| Blank | Excluded (EX) |

**Bold** – Pole position
Italics – Fastest lap

=== Teams' standings ===
| Pos. | Teams | Bike No. | AUS (Australia) | EUR (Europe) | NED (Netherlands) | ITA (Italy) | SMR (San Marino) | SPA (Spain) | CZE (Czech Republic) | GBR (United Kingdom) | GER (Germany) | ITA (Italy) | FRA (France) | POR (Portugal) | Pts. |
|---|---|---|---|---|---|---|---|---|---|---|---|---|---|---|---|
| 1 | (Italy) Yamaha ParkinGO Team | 7 | 18 | 2 | 1 | **1** | 6 | 1 | 3 | 1 | 1 | Ret | 6 | 1 | 340 |
| 1 | (Italy) Yamaha ParkinGO Team | 9 | 1 | **1** | **Ret** | 2 | EX | Ret | 7 | 12 | 4 | Ret | 1 | 4 | 340 |
| 1 | (Italy) Yamaha ParkinGO Team | 79 | | | | | DNS | | | | | | | | 340 |
| 2 | (Spain) Kawasaki Motocard.com | 44 | **4** | 6 | 5 | 8 | 4 | 3 | 4 | **2** | 8 | 5 | 4 | **2** | 292 |
| 2 | (Spain) Kawasaki Motocard.com | 23 | 2 | 5 | 3 | 4 | 1 | **Ret** | Ret | 6 | 7 | **3** | **3** | Ret | 292 |
| 3 | (Netherlands) HANNspree Ten Kate Honda | 99 | Ret | DNS | 2 | 3 | 2 | 7 | **2** | 3 | **6** | 1 | 8 | 12 | 237 |
| 3 | (Netherlands) HANNspree Ten Kate Honda | 21 | 7 | 8 | Ret | 7 | 11 | 10 | 9 | 9 | 9 | 4 | 9 | 5 | 237 |
| 4 | (Portugal) Parkalgar Honda | 11 | 3 | Ret | DNS | 5 | **3** | 2 | 6 | Ret | 3 | 2 | 2 | Ret | 180 |
| 4 | (Portugal) Parkalgar Honda | 117 | Ret | 11 | 8 | Ret | 12 | 9 | Ret | 8 | Ret | 8 | 13 | 8 | 180 |
| 5 | (Italy) Lorenzini by Leoni | 55 | Ret | 7 | 6 | 9 | Ret | 4 | 15 | 5 | 5 | Ret | Ret | 7 | 115 |
| 5 | (Italy) Lorenzini by Leoni | 31 | 8 | 9 | Ret | Ret | Ret | Ret | 10 | 15 | 12 | 7 | 12 | 11 | 115 |
| 6 | (United Kingdom) Bogdanka PTR Honda | 77 | 6 | Ret | 7 | 16 | 7 | Ret | 8 | 10 | 2 | 6 | 5 | 3 | 111 |
| 6 | (United Kingdom) Bogdanka PTR Honda | 28 | Ret | Ret | 12 | Ret | Ret | 13 | Ret | Ret | Ret | 12 | 17 | 15 | 111 |
| 7 | (Italy) Bike Service Racing Team | 22 | 20 | 12 | DSQ | 6 | 9 | 5 | 5 | 4 | 11 | Ret | 7 | 6 | 83 |
| 7 | (Italy) Bike Service Racing Team | 87 | 19 | Ret | Ret | 15 | Ret | Ret | 14 | Ret | DNS | DNS | | 17 | 83 |
| 7 | (Italy) Bike Service Racing Team | 125 | | | | | | | | | | | 19 | | 83 |
| 8 | (Ukraine) Step Racing Team | 4 | Ret | 3 | 16 | Ret | 10 | 6 | 1 | 11 | Ret | 11 | 22 | 14 | 81 |
| 8 | (Ukraine) Step Racing Team | 60 | 16 | Ret | 9 | Ret | 16 | 11 | Ret | 16 | 21 | | | | 81 |
| 8 | (Ukraine) Step Racing Team | 78 | | | | | | | | | | | | 23 | 81 |
| 8 | (Ukraine) Step Racing Team | 40 | | | | | | | | | | | DNS | | 81 |
| 9 | (Denmark) Harms Benjan Racing Team | 127 | 5 | 4 | 4 | 10 | 8 | 8 | Ret | Ret | Ret | Ret | DNS | Ret | 59 |
| 10 | Team Hungary Tóth | 38 | 14 | 14 | 10 | 14 | 18 | 12 | | 7 | 10 | Ret | 11 | 10 | 55 |
| 10 | Team Hungary Tóth | 11 | 15 | 16 | 11 | Ret | 20 | 15 | 13 | 17 | 14 | 15 | 20 | Ret | 55 |
| 10 | Team Hungary Tóth | 119 | | | | | | | 22 | | | | | | 55 |
| 11 | (Italy) Suriano Racing Team | 91 | 10 | Ret | 14 | 11 | Ret | 14 | 11 | Ret | 16 | 10 | Ret | Ret | 40 |
| 11 | (Italy) Suriano Racing Team | 34 | 11 | Ret | Ret | 17 | 21 | Ret | 16 | 14 | 15 | Ret | 10 | Ret | 40 |
| 12 | (Germany) Cresto Guide Racing Team | 5 | 9 | 10 | DNS | 19 | 15 | 16 | 12 | 13 | 13 | Ret | 14 | 13 | 29 |
| 13 | (Czech Republic) SMS Racing | 69 | 12 | 13 | Ret | DSQ | Ret | Ret | Ret | 18 | 17 | 14 | 16 | DNS | 9 |
| 14 | (Switzerland) MACH Racing | 8 | 13 | Ret | 13 | | | | | 20 | Ret | Ret | Ret | 16 | 8 |
| 14 | (Switzerland) MACH Racing | 114 | | | | | 14 | 17 | 17 | | | | | | 8 |
| 15 | (Germany) MD Team Jerman | 25 | 17 | 15 | DNS | 13 | 19 | Ret | Ret | 21 | 20 | Ret | 21 | 18 | 4 |
| | (Italy) Kuja Racing | 19 | Ret | 17 | 18 | 18 | DNS | 19 | 20 | 22 | 25 | Ret | DNQ | | 0 |
| | (Italy) Kuja Racing | 6 | | | | | | | | | | | | 20 | 0 |
| | (Russia) RivaMoto | 24 | | DNQ | DNQ | 21 | Ret | 20 | 23 | 24 | 26 | 17 | 25 | 24 | 0 |
| | (Russia) RivaMoto | 73 | | DNQ | DNQ | Ret | 23 | DNQ | 24 | DNQ | 24 | DNQ | 26 | DNQ | 0 |
| Pos. | Teams | Bike No. | AUS (Australia) | EUR (Europe) | NED (Netherlands) | ITA (Italy) | SMR (San Marino) | SPA (Spain) | CZE (Czech Republic) | GBR (United Kingdom) | GER (Germany) | ITA (Italy) | FRA (France) | POR (Portugal) | Pts. |

=== Manufacturers' standings ===
| Pos. | Manufacturer | AUS (Australia) | EUR (Europe) | NED (Netherlands) | ITA (Italy) | SMR (San Marino) | SPA (Spain) | CZE (Czech Republic) | GBR (United Kingdom) | GER (Germany) | ITA (Italy) | FRA (France) | POR (Portugal) | Pts |
|---|---|---|---|---|---|---|---|---|---|---|---|---|---|---|
| 1 | (Japan) Yamaha | 1 | 1 | 1 | 1 | 6 | 1 | 3 | 1 | 1 | 17 | 1 | 1 | 251 |
| 2 | (Japan) Honda | 3 | 3 | 2 | 3 | 2 | 2 | 1 | 3 | 2 | 1 | 2 | 3 | 230 |
| 3 | (Japan) Kawasaki | 2 | 5 | 3 | 4 | 1 | 3 | 4 | 2 | 5 | 3 | 3 | 2 | 197 |
| 4 | (United Kingdom) Triumph | 10 | 15 | 14 | 11 | 19 | 14 | 11 | 14 | 15 | 10 | 10 | 18 | 36 |
| Pos. | Manufacturer | AUS (Australia) | EUR (Europe) | NED (Netherlands) | ITA (Italy) | SMR (San Marino) | SPA (Spain) | CZE (Czech Republic) | GBR (United Kingdom) | GER (Germany) | ITA (Italy) | FRA (France) | POR (Portugal) | Pts |

== Entry list ==
2011 entry list
| Team | Constructor | Motorcycle | No. | Rider | Rounds |
|---|---|---|---|---|---|
| Vector KM Racing Team | Yamaha | Yamaha YZF-R6 | 3 | (Germany) Jesco Günther | 12 |
| Step Racing Team | Honda | Honda CBR600RR | 4 | (United Kingdom) Gino Rea | All |
| Step Racing Team | Honda | Honda CBR600RR | 40 | (United Kingdom) Martin Jessopp | 11 |
| Step Racing Team | Honda | Honda CBR600RR | 60 | (Ukraine) Vladimir Ivanov | 1–9 |
| Step Racing Team | Honda | Honda CBR600RR | 78 | (Ukraine) Konstantin Pisarev | 7 |
| Step Racing Team | Honda | Honda CBR600RR | 78 | (Ukraine) Konstantin Pisarev | 12 |
| Cresto Guide Racing Team | Honda | Honda CBR600RR | 5 | (Sweden) Alexander Lundh | All |
| KUJA Racing Team | Honda | Honda CBR600RR | 6 | (Italy) Gianluca Vizziello | 12 |
| KUJA Racing Team | Honda | Honda CBR600RR | 19 | (Australia) Mitchell Pirotta | 1–11 |
| KUJA Racing Team | Honda | Honda CBR600RR | 27 | (Switzerland) Thomas Caiani | 11–12 |
| KUJA Racing Team | Honda | Honda CBR600RR | 52 | (Italy) Michele Conti | 7 |
| KUJA Racing Team | Honda | Honda CBR600RR | 80 | (Italy) Giovanni Altomonte | 4 |
| Yamaha ParkinGO Team | Yamaha | Yamaha YZF-R6 | 7 | (United Kingdom) Chaz Davies | All |
| Yamaha ParkinGO Team | Yamaha | Yamaha YZF-R6 | 9 | (Italy) Luca Scassa | 1–4, 6–12 |
| Yamaha ParkinGO Team | Yamaha | Yamaha YZF-R6 | 79 | (Italy) Giuliano Rovelli | 5 |
| MACH Racing | Honda | Honda CBR600RR | 8 | (Switzerland) Bastien Chesaux | 1–3, 8–12 |
| MACH Racing | Honda | Honda CBR600RR | 114 | (Switzerland) Roman Stamm | 5–7 |
| Team Hungary Tóth | Honda | Honda CBR600RR | 10 | (Hungary) Imre Tóth | All |
| Team Hungary Tóth | Honda | Honda CBR600RR | 38 | (Hungary) Balázs Németh | 1–6, 8–12 |
| Team Hungary Tóth | Honda | Honda CBR600RR | 119 | (Hungary) János Chrobák | 7 |
| Parkalgar Honda | Honda | Honda CBR600RR | 11 | (United Kingdom) Sam Lowes | All |
| Parkalgar Honda | Honda | Honda CBR600RR | 117 | (Portugal) Miguel Praia | All |
| Puccetti Racing | Kawasaki | Kawasaki ZX-6R | 12 | (Italy) Stefano Cruciani | 5, 10 |
| Puccetti Racing | Kawasaki | Kawasaki ZX-6R | 32 | (Italy) Mirko Giansanti | 4–5, 7 |
| Team Appleyard Macadam Racing | Yamaha | Yamaha YZF-R6 | 14 | (Republic of Ireland) Jack Kennedy | 2 |
| Dark Dog Academy | Yamaha | Yamaha YZF-R6 | 15 | (France) Louis Bulle | 11 |
| AARK Racing | Triumph | Triumph Daytona 675 | 16 | (Australia) Christian Casella | 8 |
| Prorace | Honda | Honda CBR600RR | 17 | (Czech Republic) Patrik Vostárek | 7, 9–11 |
| Hannspree Ten Kate Honda | Honda | Honda CBR600RR | 21 | (France) Florian Marino | All |
| Hannspree Ten Kate Honda | Honda | Honda CBR600RR | 99 | (France) Fabien Foret | All |
| Bike Service Racing Team | Yamaha | Yamaha YZF-R6 | 22 | (Italy) Roberto Tamburini | All |
| Bike Service Racing Team | Yamaha | Yamaha YZF-R6 | 87 | (Italy) Luca Marconi | 1–10, 12 |
| Bike Service Racing Team | Yamaha | Yamaha YZF-R6 | 125 | (Italy) Danilo Marrancone | 11 |
| Kawasaki Motocard.com | Kawasaki | Kawasaki ZX-6R | 23 | (Australia) Broc Parkes | All |
| Kawasaki Motocard.com | Kawasaki | Kawasaki ZX-6R | 44 | (Spain) David Salom | All |
| RivaMoto | Yamaha | Yamaha YZF-R6 | 24 | (Russia) Eduard Blokhin | 2–12 |
| RivaMoto | Yamaha | Yamaha YZF-R6 | 30 | (Russia) Valery Yurchenko | 4–5, 7 |
| RivaMoto | Yamaha | Yamaha YZF-R6 | 73 | (Russia) Oleg Pozdneev | 2–12 |
| MD Team Jerman | Triumph | Triumph Daytona 675 | 25 | (Slovenia) Marko Jerman | All |
| Bogdanka PTR Honda | Honda | Honda CBR600RR | 28 | (Poland) Paweł Szkopek | All |
| Bogdanka PTR Honda | Honda | Honda CBR600RR | 77 | (United Kingdom) James Ellison | All |
| Lorenzini by Leoni | Kawasaki | Kawasaki ZX-6R | 31 | (Italy) Vittorio Iannuzzo | All |
| Lorenzini by Leoni | Kawasaki | Kawasaki ZX-6R | 55 | (Italy) Massimo Roccoli | All |
| Team MRC Austria | Yamaha | Yamaha YZF-R6 | 33 | (Austria) Yves Polzer | 3–10 |
| Suriano Racing Team | Triumph | Triumph Daytona 675 | 34 | (South Africa) Ronan Quarmby | All |
| Suriano Racing Team | Triumph | Triumph Daytona 675 | 91 | (Italy) Danilo Dell'Omo | All |
| GERIN-SKM Racing Team | Yamaha | Yamaha YZF-R6 | 37 | (Austria) David Linortner | 12 |
| GERIN-SKM Racing Team | Yamaha | Yamaha YZF-R6 | 76 | (Austria) Günther Knobloch | 12 |
| Triple M Racing | Yamaha | Yamaha YZF-R6 | 43 | (Germany) Marc Moser | 9 |
| PTR Romania | Honda | Honda CBR600RR | 45 | (Romania) Cătălin Cazacu | 7, 9–11 |
| PTR Romania | Honda | Honda CBR600RR | 95 | (Romania) Robert Mureșan | 2–4 |
| Velmotor 2000 | Honda | Honda CBR600RR | 51 | (Italy) Alessio Velini | 5 |
| Vice Versa-AAracing | Yamaha | Yamaha YZF-R6 | 53 | (Netherlands) Jos van der Aa | 3 |
| VD Heyden Motors Racing Team | Yamaha | Yamaha YZF-R6 | 57 | (Netherlands) Kervin Bos | 3, 9 |
| Pro Ride Mol Dynamic | Yamaha | Yamaha YZF-R6 | 59 | (Hungary) Ferenc Kurucz | 7 |
| VFT Racing | Yamaha | Yamaha YZF-R6 | 61 | (Italy) Fabio Menghi | 10 |
| Yakhnich Motorsport | Yamaha | Yamaha YZF-R6 | 65 | (Russia) Vladimir Leonov | 5, 12 |
| SMS Racing | Honda | Honda CBR600RR | 69 | (Czech Republic) Ondřej Ježek | All |
| 777 RR Motorsport | Triumph | Triumph Daytona 675 | 70 | (Finland) Pauli Pekkanen | 11 |
| Inotherm Racing Team Slovenia | Yamaha | Yamaha YZF-R6 | 74 | (Slovenia) Boštjan Skubic | 7 |
| Vigi Racing Team | Yamaha | Yamaha YZF-R6 | 82 | (Italy) Iuri Vigilucci | 5 |
| Profile Road and Racing Performance | Kawasaki | Kawasaki ZX-6R | 88 | (United Kingdom) Luke Stapleford | 8, 12 |
| Marconi Racing | Yamaha | Yamaha YZF-R6 | 121 | (Italy) William Marconi | 5 |
| Harms Benjan Racing Team | Honda | Honda CBR600RR | 127 | (Denmark) Robbin Harms | All |
| Honda Italia | Honda | Honda CBR600RR | 157 | (Italy) Ilario Dionisi | 5 |

Key
Regular rider
Wildcard rider
Replacement rider

- All entries used Pirelli tyres.
