= Luca Scassa =

Italian motorcycle racer (born 1983)

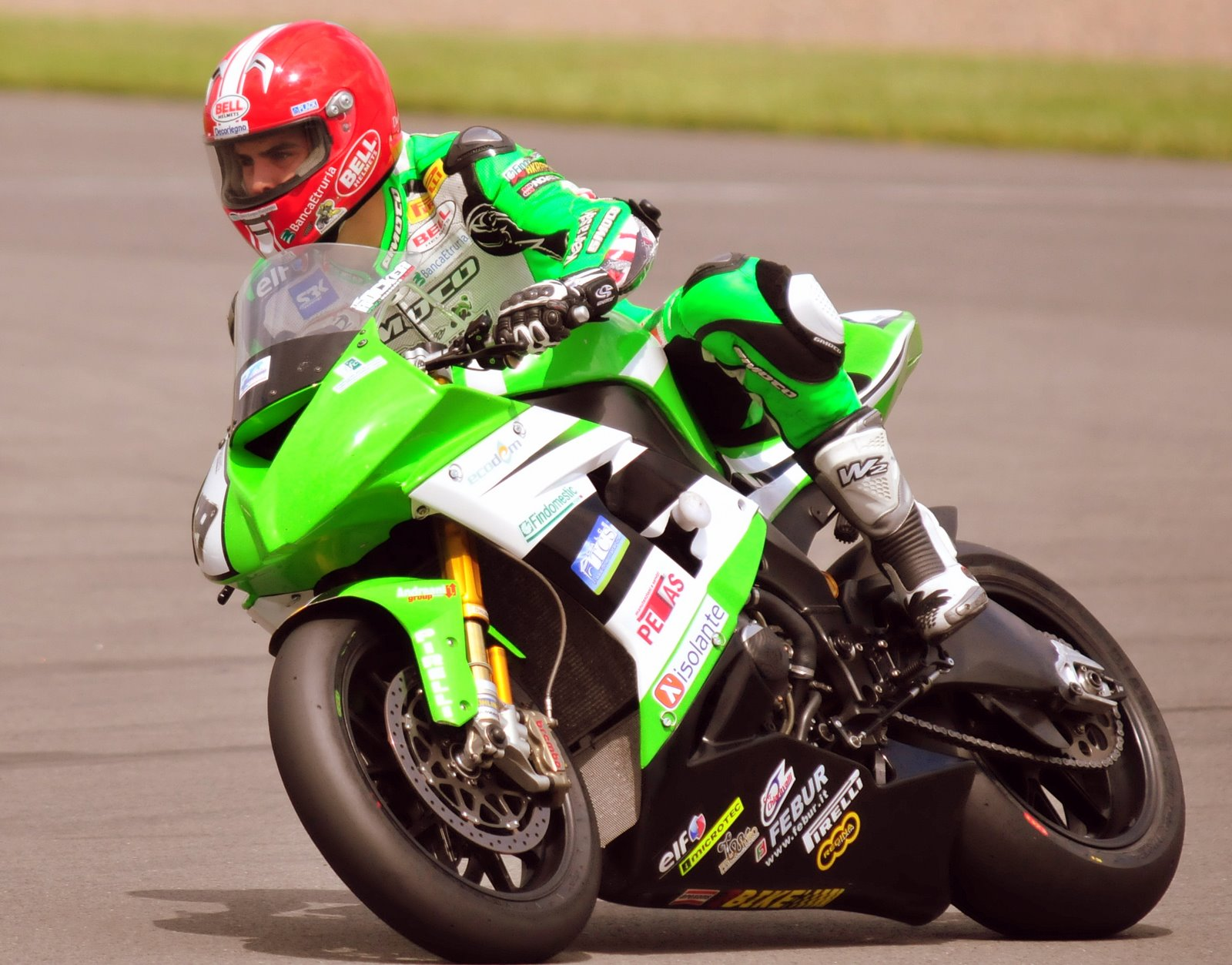
- Scassa in 2009
- Nationality: Italian
- Born: 23 August 1983 (age 43); Arezzo, Italy
Motorcycle racing career statistics
MotoGP World Championship
Active years	2013
Manufacturers	ART
Championships	0
2013 championship position	NC (0 pts)
Starts / Wins / Podiums / Poles / F. laps / Points; 5 / 0 / 0 / 0 / 0 / 0
Superbike World Championship
Active years	2008–2010, 2014–2016
Manufacturers	Honda, Kawasaki, Ducati
Championships	0
2016 championship position	24th (10 pts)
Starts / Wins / Podiums / Poles / F. laps / Points; 71 / 0 / 0 / 0 / 0 / 132
Supersport World Championship
Active years	2011, 2013
Manufacturers	Yamaha, Kawasaki
Championships	0
2013 championship position	8th (75 pts)
Starts / Wins / Podiums / Poles / F. laps / Points; 22 / 3 / 5 / 2 / 1 / 209
British Superbike Championship
Active years	2012
Manufacturers	Honda
Championships	0
2012 championship position	15th (76 pts)
Starts / Wins / Podiums / Poles / F. laps / Points; 25 / 0 / 0 / 0 / 0 / 76

Luca Scassa (born 23 August 1983) is an Italian former motorcycle racer and Ducati Corse test rider.

Scassa previously competed in the MotoGP World Championship, the Superbike World Championship the Supersport World Championship, the AMA Superbike Championship and the British Superbike Championship. He was the Italian Superbike Champion in 2008 riding a MV Agusta. In 2022 FIM Endurance World Championship, he rode for Italian based No Limits Motor Team in the Superstock category.

== Career ==
Having competed between 2004 and 2007 in the Superstock 1000 FIM Cup, Scassa became Italian Superbike Champion in 2008 with the MV Agusta F4 R 312 with team Unionbike Gimotorsports. In the same year, he made his debut in the World Superbike Championship as a replacement rider for the DF Racing Team at the circuit of Portimão, scoring no points.

=== 2009 ===
In 2009, Scassa participated in the World Superbike Championship with a Team Pedercini Kawasaki ZX-10R. He finished his first full season in 29th place overall with 11 points, his best finish being 13th, in race 1 in the French Grand Prix held at Magny-Cours.

=== 2010 ===
On February 16, it was announced that Scassa would take part in the World Superbike 2010 championship with Ducati 1098R Team Supersonic Racing. In the course of the season, Scassa was forced to miss the first race in Australia at Phillip Island, and again in Silverstone because of a fall in race 1 at Brno which caused the fracture of the third and fourth metatarsal of his left foot. Even with these problems, he still managed to improve his results of the previous year, ranking in 17th place in the riders' championship with 85 points.

=== 2011 ===
For 2011, Scassa joined the Supersport World Championship riding a Yamaha YZF-R6 for Team ParkinGO, managing three wins during the season and finishing in fifth place in the standings; during the year, he was forced to miss the weekend at Misano by disqualification for making an illegal test with a production bike on the same track. A few weeks earlier, his 'Scassa Racing Experience School' was instructing riders at the Misano circuit using Yamaha R1's, and although not the same R6 motorcycle Scassa used in the championship, the rules of the WSS Championship clearly stated unless the team designated such track as a test circuit they could not use the facility.

=== 2012 ===
For 2012, Scassa joined the British Superbike Championship, racing a Honda CBR1000RR for the Padgetts Racing team. He had a season of ups and downs especially on the new, unfamiliar circuits, a fourth place at Assen was his best finish. He finished the season in 15th place with 76 points.

=== 2013 ===
For 2013, Scassa returned to the World Supersport championship riding the Kawasaki ZX-6R Kawasaki for team Intermoto Ponyexpres. In September 2013, it was announced that Scassa would stand-in for an injured MotoGP rider Karel Abraham as part of the Cardion AB team for the Aragon race. This would be his first-ever ride for a MotoGP team. After finishing 17th in his first GP, it was announced that Scassa would be replacing Abraham for the rest of the 2013 season.

== Career statistics ==
=== CIV Championship (Campionato Italiano Velocita) ===
==== Races by year ====
(key) (Races in bold indicate pole position; races in italics indicate fastest lap)

Year	Class	Bike	1	2	3	4	5	6	Pos	Pts
2004	Stock 1000	Kawasaki	MUG; 1	IMO; 24	VAL1; Ret	MIS; 2	VAL2; 4		4th	58
2005	Stock 1000	Yamaha	VAL; 5	MON; 4	IMO; Ret	MIS1; 5	MUG; 3	**MIS2**; 2	4th	71

=== Superstock European Championship ===
==== Races by year ====
(key) (Races in bold indicate pole position) (Races in italics indicate fastest lap)

Year	Bike	1	2	3	4	5	6	7	8	9	Pos	Pts
2004	Kawasaki	VAL; 7	SMR; 6	MNZ; Ret	OSC; 16	SIL; 6	BRA; 7	NED; 10	IMO; 3	MAG; 7	7th	69

=== FIM Superstock 1000 Cup ===
==== Races by year ====
(key) (Races in bold indicate pole position) (Races in italics indicate fastest lap)

Year	Bike	1	2	3	4	5	6	7	8	9	10	11	Pos	Pts
2005	Yamaha	VAL; 21	MNZ; Ret	SIL; 8	SMR; 7	BRN; 15	BRA; 2	NED; Ret	LAU; 2	IMO; 6	MAG; 6		7th	8
2006	MV Agusta	VAL; 5	MNZ; 5	SIL; 4	SMR; 3	BRN; 2	BRA; 1	NED; 5	LAU; 5	IMO; 1	MAG; Ret		3rd	143
2007	MV Agusta	DON	VAL	NED	MNZ	SIL; Ret	SMR	BRN	BRA	LAU	ITA	MAG; 4	21st	13

=== MotoAmerica SuperBike Championship ===
Year	Class	Team	1	2		3		4		5		6		7	8		9		10		11	Pos	Pts
Year	Class	Team	R1	R1	R2	R1	R2	R1	R2	R1	R2	R1	R2	R1	R1	R2	R1	R2	R1	R2	R1	Pos	Pts
2007	SuperBike	MV Agusta	DAY; 23	BAR; Ret	BAR; 12	FON; 19	FON; Ret	INF; 13	INF; 11	RAM; 11	RAM; Ret	MIL; 11	MIL; 10	LAG; Ret	OHI; 11	OHI; 12	VIR; 12	VIR; 7	RAT; 8	RAT; 12	LAG; Ret	15th	262

=== Superbike World Championship ===
==== Races by year ====
(key) (Races in bold indicate pole position, races in italics indicate fastest lap)

Year	Bike	1		2		3		4		5		6		7		8		9		10		11		12		13		14		Pos	Pts
Year	Bike	R1	R2	R1	R2	R1	R2	R1	R2	R1	R2	R1	R2	R1	R2	R1	R2	R1	R2	R1	R2	R1	R2	R1	R2	R1	R2	R1	R2	Pos	Pts
2008	Honda	QAT	QAT	AUS	AUS	ESP	ESP	NED	NED	ITA	ITA	USA	USA	GER	GER	SMR	SMR	CZE	CZE	GBR	GBR	EUR	EUR	ITA	ITA	FRA	FRA	POR; Ret	POR; 27	NC	0
2009	Kawasaki	AUS; 20	AUS; 20	QAT; 17	QAT; 20	SPA; 18	SPA; 24	NED; Ret	NED; 15	ITA; 23	ITA; 14	RSA; 17	RSA; Ret	USA; 19	USA; Ret	SMR; Ret	SMR; 20	GBR; 19	GBR; 16	CZE; 16	CZE; Ret	GER; 16	GER; 14	ITA; 16	ITA; 18	FRA; 13	FRA; Ret	POR; 15	POR; 14	29th	11
2010	Ducati	AUS	AUS	POR; 20	POR; 16	SPA; 14	SPA; 14	NED; 15	NED; 11	ITA; 16	ITA; 10	RSA; 11	RSA; 12	USA; 7	USA; 10	SMR; 11	SMR; 8	CZE; Ret	CZE; DNS	GBR; DNS	GBR; DNS	GER; 10	GER; 14	ITA; 13	ITA; 10	FRA; 10	FRA; 7			17th	85
2014	Kawasaki	AUS	AUS	SPA; 16	SPA; 14	NED; 11	NED; 12	ITA; 13	ITA; 14	GBR	GBR	MAL	MAL	ITA	ITA	POR; WD	POR; WD	USA	USA	SPA; DNS	SPA; DNS	FRA	FRA	QAT	QAT					24th	16
2015	Ducati	AUS	AUS	THA	THA	SPA	SPA	NED	NED	ITA	ITA	GBR	GBR	POR	POR	ITA; WD	ITA; WD	USA	USA	MAL	MAL	SPA	SPA	FRA; 13	FRA; 9	QAT	QAT			27th	10
2016	Ducati	AUS	AUS	THA	THA	SPA	SPA	NED	NED	ITA	ITA	MAL; 13	MAL; 17	GBR; Ret	GBR; 17	ITA	ITA	USA	USA	GER; 15	GER; 11	FRA; 15	FRA; Ret	SPA; Ret	SPA; 16	QAT; 16	QAT; 16			24th	10

=== Supersport World Championship ===
==== Races by year ====
(key) (Races in bold indicate pole position, races in italics indicate fastest lap)

Year	Bike	1	2	3	4	5	6	7	8	9	10	11	12	13	Pos	Pts
2011	Yamaha	AUS; 1	**EUR**; 1	**NED**; Ret	ITA; 2	SMR; EX	SPA; Ret	CZE; 7	GBR; 12	GER; 4	ITA; Ret	FRA; 1	POR; 4		5th	134
2013	Kawasaki	AUS; 6	SPA; 3	NED; Ret	ITA; 8	GBR; 5	POR; 8	ITA; 6	RUS; C	GBR; 13	GER; 13	TUR; 11	FRA; 15	SPA	8th	75

=== Grand Prix motorcycle racing ===
==== By season ====
Season	Class	Motorcycle	Team	Race	Win	Podium	Pole	FLap	Pts	Plcd
2013	MotoGP	ART	Cardion AB Motoracing	5	0	0	0	0	0	NC
Total				**5**	**0**	**0**	**0**	**0**	**0**	

==== Races by year ====
(key) (Races in bold indicate pole position, races in italics indicate fastest lap)

Year	Class	Bike	1	2	3	4	5	6	7	8	9	10	11	12	13	14	15	16	17	18	Pos	Pts
2013	MotoGP	ART	QAT	AME	SPA	FRA	ITA	CAT	NED	GER	USA	INP	CZE	GBR	RSM	ARA; 17	MAL; 17	AUS; 16	JPN; Ret	VAL; 18	NC	0

=== British Superbike Championship ===
==== By year ====
Year	Make	1		2		3			4		5		6			7		8		9		10		11		12			Pos	Pts
Year	Make	R1	R2	R1	R2	R1	R2	R3	R1	R2	R1	R2	R1	R2	R3	R1	R2	R1	R2	R1	R2	R1	R2	R1	R2	R1	R2	R3	Pos	Pts
2012	Honda	BHI; Ret	BHI; C	THR; 8	THR; 6	OUL; 13	OUL; Ret	OUL; 17	SNE; Ret	SNE; Ret	KNO; 16	KNO; Ret	OUL; Ret	OUL; Ret	OUL; DNS	BHGP; 14	BHGP; 16	CAD; 15	CAD; 17	DON; 11	DON; 8	ASS; 4	ASS; 11	SIL; 8	SIL; 6	BHGP; Ret	BHGP; 15	BHGP; 14	15th	76
