= 2011 Superbike World Championship =

Twenty-fourth season of Superbike World Championship

2011 Superbike World Championship
Previous:	2010	Next:	2012
Support series: Supersport World Championship; FIM Superstock 1000 Cup; European Superstock 600 Championship; European Junior Cup

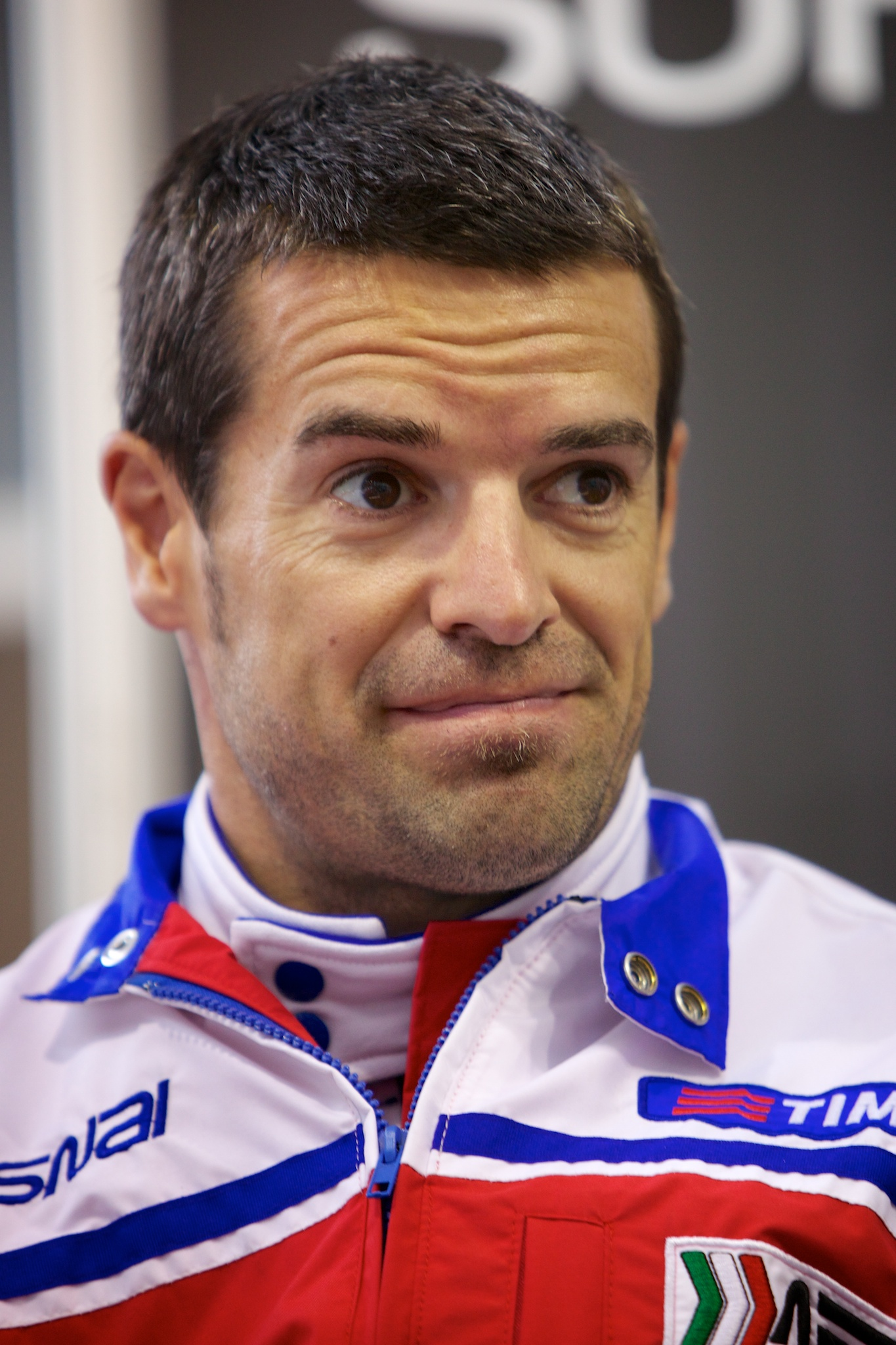
Carlos Checa was the 2011 Superbike Champion.

The 2011 Superbike World Championship was the twenty-fourth season of the Superbike World Championship. It began on 27 February at Phillip Island and finished on 16 October in Portimão after 13 rounds.

The knockout system introduced for Superpole in 2009 was revised as the number of riders admitted to the first two sessions was reduced from twenty to sixteen and from sixteen to twelve respectively.

Ducati no longer competed with a factory team in 2011, after 23 seasons which had brought the marque a total of 29 riders' and manufacturers' championship titles, instead limiting its participation to privateer teams running their works bikes. Aprilia's gear-driven camshafts on its RSV4 motorcycle – which won the title in 2010 with Max Biaggi – was banned for the 2011 season.

After dominating since the season opening, Carlos Checa won his first championship and Ducati's 17th manufacturer title.

== Race calendar and results ==
The provisional race schedule was publicly announced by the FIM on 7 October 2010 with eleven confirmed rounds and two other rounds pending confirmation. Having been announced as a venue from 2011 onwards in May 2010, Motorland Aragon replaced Kyalami on the calendar, while Donington Park returned to the championship, hosting the European round. Imola was confirmed in November 2010, to finalise a 13-round calendar. All races with the exception of Miller Motorsports Park – races held on Memorial Day Monday – were held on Sundays.

2011 Superbike World Championship Calendar
Round		Country	Circuit	Date	Superpole	Fastest lap	Winning rider	Winning team	Report
1	R1	Australia	Phillip Island Grand Prix Circuit	27 February	(Spain) Carlos Checa	(Italy) Max Biaggi	(Spain) Carlos Checa	Althea Racing	Report
1	R2	Australia	Phillip Island Grand Prix Circuit	27 February	(Spain) Carlos Checa	(Italy) Max Biaggi	(Spain) Carlos Checa	Althea Racing	Report
2	R1	(United Kingdom) Great Britain	Donington Park	27 March	(Spain) Carlos Checa	(Japan) Noriyuki Haga	(Italy) Marco Melandri	Yamaha World Superbike Team	Report
2	R2	(United Kingdom) Great Britain	Donington Park	27 March	(Spain) Carlos Checa	(Spain) Carlos Checa	(Spain) Carlos Checa	Althea Racing	Report
3	R1	Netherlands	TT Circuit Assen	17 April	(Spain) Carlos Checa	(United Kingdom) Tom Sykes	(United Kingdom) Jonathan Rea	Castrol Honda Team	Report
3	R2	Netherlands	TT Circuit Assen	17 April	(Spain) Carlos Checa	(United Kingdom) Leon Camier	(Spain) Carlos Checa	Althea Racing	Report
4	R1	Italy	Autodromo Nazionale di Monza	8 May	(Italy) Max Biaggi	(Italy) Michel Fabrizio	(Republic of Ireland) Eugene Laverty	Yamaha World Superbike Team	Report
4	R2	Italy	Autodromo Nazionale di Monza	8 May	(Italy) Max Biaggi	(Italy) Max Biaggi	(Republic of Ireland) Eugene Laverty	Yamaha World Superbike Team	Report
5	R1	United States	Miller Motorsports Park	30 May	(Spain) Carlos Checa	(Spain) Carlos Checa	(Spain) Carlos Checa	Althea Racing	Report
5	R2	United States	Miller Motorsports Park	30 May	(Spain) Carlos Checa	(Spain) Carlos Checa	(Spain) Carlos Checa	Althea Racing	Report
6	R1	San Marino	Misano World Circuit	12 June	(United Kingdom) Tom Sykes	(Spain) Carlos Checa	(Spain) Carlos Checa	Althea Racing	Report
6	R2	San Marino	Misano World Circuit	12 June	(United Kingdom) Tom Sykes	(Spain) Carlos Checa	(Spain) Carlos Checa	Althea Racing	Report
7	R1	Spain	Motorland Aragón	19 June	(Italy) Marco Melandri	(Spain) Carlos Checa	(Italy) Marco Melandri	Yamaha World Superbike Team	Report
7	R2	Spain	Motorland Aragón	19 June	(Italy) Marco Melandri	(Italy) Marco Melandri	(Italy) Max Biaggi	Aprilia Alitalia Racing Team	Report
8	R1	Czech Republic	Masaryk Circuit	10 July	(Italy) Max Biaggi	(Italy) Marco Melandri	(Italy) Marco Melandri	Yamaha World Superbike Team	Report
8	R2	Czech Republic	Masaryk Circuit	10 July	(Italy) Max Biaggi	(Italy) Marco Melandri	(Italy) Max Biaggi	Aprilia Alitalia Racing Team	Report
9	R1	(United Kingdom) Great Britain	Silverstone Circuit	31 July	(United States) John Hopkins	(Spain) Carlos Checa	(Spain) Carlos Checa	Althea Racing	Report
9	R2	(United Kingdom) Great Britain	Silverstone Circuit	31 July	(United States) John Hopkins	(Italy) Max Biaggi	(Spain) Carlos Checa	Althea Racing	Report
10	R1	Germany	Nürburgring	4 September	(Spain) Carlos Checa	(Spain) Carlos Checa	(Spain) Carlos Checa	Althea Racing	Report
10	R2	Germany	Nürburgring	4 September	(Spain) Carlos Checa	(Japan) Noriyuki Haga	(United Kingdom) Tom Sykes	Kawasaki Racing Team	Report
11	R1	Italy	Autodromo Enzo e Dino Ferrari	25 September	(Spain) Carlos Checa	(Japan) Noriyuki Haga	(United Kingdom) Jonathan Rea	Castrol Honda Team	Report
11	R2	Italy	Autodromo Enzo e Dino Ferrari	25 September	(Spain) Carlos Checa	(Spain) Carlos Checa	(Spain) Carlos Checa	Althea Racing	Report
12	R1	France	Circuit de Nevers Magny-Cours	2 October	(United Kingdom) Jonathan Rea	(Spain) Carlos Checa	(Spain) Carlos Checa	Althea Racing	Report
12	R2	France	Circuit de Nevers Magny-Cours	2 October	(United Kingdom) Jonathan Rea	(Spain) Carlos Checa	(Spain) Carlos Checa	Althea Racing	Report
13	R1	Portugal	Autódromo Internacional do Algarve	16 October	(United Kingdom) Jonathan Rea	(France) Sylvain Guintoli	(Spain) Carlos Checa	Althea Racing	Report
13	R2	Portugal	Autódromo Internacional do Algarve	16 October	(United Kingdom) Jonathan Rea	(Spain) Joan Lascorz	(Italy) Marco Melandri	Yamaha World Superbike Team	Report

== Entry list ==
2011 entry list
Team	Constructor	Motorcycle	No.	Rider	Rounds
(Italy) Aprillia Alitalia Racing Team	Aprilia	Aprilia RSV4 1000	1	(Italy) Max Biaggi	1–10, 13
(Italy) Aprillia Alitalia Racing Team	Aprilia	Aprilia RSV4 1000	2	(United Kingdom) Leon Camier	All
(Netherlands) Castrol Honda	Honda	Honda CBR1000RR	4	(United Kingdom) Jonathan Rea	1–6, 10–13
(Netherlands) Castrol Honda	Honda	Honda CBR1000RR	22	(United Kingdom) Alex Lowes	8–9
(Netherlands) Castrol Honda	Honda	Honda CBR1000RR	31	(Australia) Karl Muggeridge	13
(Netherlands) Castrol Honda	Honda	Honda CBR1000RR	32	(Italy) Fabrizio Lai	9
(Netherlands) Castrol Honda	Honda	Honda CBR1000RR	100	(Japan) Makoto Tamada	10
(Netherlands) Castrol Honda	Honda	Honda CBR1000RR	111	(Spain) Rubén Xaus	1–8, 11–12
(Italy) Althea Racing	Ducati	Ducati 1098R	7	(Spain) Carlos Checa	All
(Italy) Althea Racing	Ducati	Ducati 1098R	23	(Italy) Federico Sandi	11
(Italy) Althea Racing	Ducati	Ducati 1098R	34	(Italy) Davide Giugliano	13
(Italy) Team Pedercini	Kawasaki	Kawasaki ZX-10R	8	(Australia) Mark Aitchison	All
(Italy) Team Pedercini	Kawasaki	Kawasaki ZX-10R	44	(Italy) Roberto Rolfo	1–12
(Italy) Team Pedercini	Kawasaki	Kawasaki ZX-10R	51	(Spain) Santiago Barragán	13
(Italy) Team Pedercini	Kawasaki	Kawasaki ZX-10R	67	(Australia) Bryan Staring	1
(United Kingdom) Samsung Crescent Racing	Suzuki	Suzuki GSX-R1000	10	(United Kingdom) Jon Kirkham	9
(United Kingdom) Samsung Crescent Racing	Suzuki	Suzuki GSX-R1000	211	(United States) John Hopkins	9
(Germany) BMW Motorrad Motorsport	BMW	BMW S1000RR	11	(Australia) Troy Corser	1–7, 9–13
(Germany) BMW Motorrad Motorsport	BMW	BMW S1000RR	91	(United Kingdom) Leon Haslam	All
(Japan) Yoshimura Suzuki Racing Team	Suzuki	Suzuki GSX-R1000	12	(Australia) Josh Waters	1, 5, 13
(Hungary) Prop-tech Ltd.	Honda	Honda CBR1000RR	13	(Hungary) Viktor Kispataki	8
(Italy) Barni Racing Team	Ducati	Ducati 1098R	15	(Italy) Matteo Baiocco	6, 8, 11
(Italy) Barni Racing Team	Ducati	Ducati 1098R	53	(Italy) Alessandro Polita	6, 11
(Japan) Kawasaki Racing Team	Kawasaki	Kawasaki ZX-10R	17	(Spain) Joan Lascorz	All
(Japan) Kawasaki Racing Team	Kawasaki	Kawasaki ZX-10R	66	(United Kingdom) Tom Sykes	All
(Japan) Kawasaki Racing Team	Kawasaki	Kawasaki ZX-10R	77	(Australia) Chris Vermeulen	2–4, 6–8
(Italy) Echo Sport Racing Company	Honda	Honda CBR1000RR	32	(Italy) Fabrizio Lai	4
(Japan) Yamaha World Superbike Team	Yamaha	Yamaha YZF-R1	33	(Italy) Marco Melandri	All
(Japan) Yamaha World Superbike Team	Yamaha	Yamaha YZF-R1	58	(Republic of Ireland) Eugene Laverty	All
(Italy) BMW Motorrad Italia SBK Team	BMW	BMW S1000RR	37	(Netherlands) Barry Veneman	3
(Italy) BMW Motorrad Italia SBK Team	BMW	BMW S1000RR	52	(United Kingdom) James Toseland	1, 4–5, 9–10
(Italy) BMW Motorrad Italia SBK Team	BMW	BMW S1000RR	57	(Italy) Lorenzo Lanzi	6–8
(Italy) BMW Motorrad Italia SBK Team	BMW	BMW S1000RR	86	(Italy) Ayrton Badovini	All
(Italy) BMW Motorrad Italia SBK Team	BMW	BMW S1000RR	112	(Spain) Javier Forés	11–13
(Italy) PATA Racing Team Aprilia	Aprilia	Aprilia RSV4 1000	41	(Japan) Noriyuki Haga	All
(Czech Republic) Team Effenbert-Liberty Racing	Ducati	Ducati 1098R	50	(France) Sylvain Guintoli	All
(Czech Republic) Team Effenbert-Liberty Racing	Ducati	Ducati 1098R	96	(Czech Republic) Jakub Smrž	All
(United Kingdom) Team Suzuki Alstare	Suzuki	Suzuki GSX-R1000	84	(Italy) Michel Fabrizio	All
(Italy) Supersonic Racing Team	Ducati	Ducati 1098R	121	(France) Maxime Berger	All

Key
Regular rider
Wildcard rider
Replacement rider

- All entries used Pirelli tyres.

== Championship standings ==
=== Riders' standings ===
Pos.	Rider	Bike	AUS (Australia)		EUR (Europe)		NED (Netherlands)		ITA (Italy)		USA (United States)		SMR (San Marino)		SPA (Spain)		CZE (Czech Republic)		GBR (United Kingdom)		GER (Germany)		ITA (Italy)		FRA (France)		POR (Portugal)		Pts
Pos.	Rider	Bike	R1	R2	R1	R2	R1	R2	R1	R2	R1	R2	R1	R2	R1	R2	R1	R2	R1	R2	R1	R2	R1	R2	R1	R2	R1	R2	Pts
1	(Spain) Carlos Checa	Ducati	**1**	**1**	**3**	**1**	**3**	**1**	9	10	**1**	**1**	1	1	Ret	3	3	3	1	1	**1**	**8**	**3**	**1**	1	1	1	4	505
2	(Italy) Marco Melandri	Yamaha	5	3	1	2	4	Ret	4	2	10	6	3	Ret	**1**	**2**	1	2	3	3	2	6	8	6	2	2	6	1	395
3	(Italy) Max Biaggi	Aprilia	2	2	7	DSQ	2	2	**2**	**8**	Ret	3	2	2	2	1	**2**	**1**	11	4	DNS	DNS					4	7	303
4	(Republic of Ireland) Eugene Laverty	Yamaha	4	15	Ret	14	7	6	1	1	5	4	5	13	4	6	5	5	2	2	4	5	5	4	5	3	19	2	303
5	(United Kingdom) Leon Haslam	BMW	3	5	4	4	12	5	3	Ret	8	13	Ret	5	9	9	8	7	4	8	5	9	Ret	5	3	4	9	15	224
6	(France) Sylvain Guintoli	Ducati	Ret	DNS	11	11	Ret	10	12	7	3	7	7	7	11	11	20	9	6	6	6	2	6	7	6	5	2	5	210
7	(United Kingdom) Leon Camier	Aprilia	13	6	8	3	Ret	4	8	Ret	4	2	6	Ret	3	8	7	Ret	15	5	8	Ret	15	3	4	6	12	6	208
8	(Japan) Noriyuki Haga	Aprilia	9	7	6	17	Ret	8	16	4	9	Ret	Ret	3	6	7	12	10	Ret	Ret	3	Ret	2	2	7	10	15	11	176
9	(United Kingdom) Jonathan Rea	Honda	12	4	5	6	1	3	6	Ret	Ret	11	DNS	DNS							10	4	1	Ret	**Ret**	**Ret**	**3**	**3**	170
10	(Italy) Ayrton Badovini	BMW	14	Ret	13	9	9	15	11	6	7	9	8	4	8	10	6	6	10	10	9	7	9	10	Ret	8	13	9	165
11	(Spain) Joan Lascorz	Kawasaki	Ret	Ret	10	5	11	12	Ret	9	14	12	9	9	7	5	9	8	7	Ret	7	11	10	8	8	7	5	8	161
12	(Italy) Michel Fabrizio	Suzuki	6	8	Ret	7	5	7	5	3	Ret	5	Ret	6	Ret	4	4	4	Ret	9	16	Ret	Ret	Ret	12	Ret	11	14	152
13	(United Kingdom) Tom Sykes	Kawasaki	8	9	Ret	12	14	11	13	11	6	10	**4**	**14**	5	Ret	10	14	DNS	DNS	11	1	4	Ret	10	Ret	8	Ret	141
14	(Czech Republic) Jakub Smrž	Ducati	7	11	2	8	Ret	9	10	Ret	2	8	Ret	Ret	Ret	Ret	11	Ret	Ret	11	Ret	3	7	Ret	Ret	DNS	10	13	127
15	(Australia) Troy Corser	BMW	10	19	9	13	6	Ret	7	5	13	Ret	Ret	DNS	10	Ret			9	Ret	15	12	12	Ret	9	9	14	16	87
16	(France) Maxime Berger	Ducati	20	18	Ret	Ret	Ret	13	14	Ret	11	14	10	Ret	13	Ret	13	Ret	8	12	Ret	10	Ret	13	Ret	12	7	10	64
17	(Spain) Rubén Xaus	Honda	16	10	12	10	8	14	15	12	Ret	18	11	8	16	Ret	Ret	DNS					17	11	DNS	DNS			49
18	(Italy) Roberto Rolfo	Kawasaki	11	12	14	15	Ret	16	Ret	13	17	16	Ret	12	14	13	14	11	13	Ret	14	13	18	Ret	13	Ret			42
19	(Australia) Mark Aitchison	Kawasaki	19	16	15	16	10	18	17	14	16	17	Ret	Ret	15	12	16	12	Ret	14	12	Ret	11	9	Ret	Ret	17	20	36
20	(United States) John Hopkins	Suzuki																	**5**	**7**									20
21	(Australia) Chris Vermeulen	Kawasaki			DNS	DNS	Ret	DNS	DNS	DNS			14	10	12	14	18	DNS											14
22	(United Kingdom) James Toseland	BMW	17	14					DNS	DNS	15	DNS					WD	WD	12	13	13	Ret							13
23	(Spain) Javier Forés	BMW																					Ret	14	11	11	Ret	19	12
24	(Italy) Lorenzo Lanzi	BMW											15	11	Ret	15	17	13											10
25	(Australia) Josh Waters	Suzuki	18	13							12	15															21	18	8
26	(Italy) Federico Sandi	Ducati																					13	12					7
27	(Italy) Alessandro Polita	Ducati											13	Ret									14	Ret					5
28	(Italy) Davide Giugliano	Ducati																									16	12	4
29	(Italy) Matteo Baiocco	Ducati											12	Ret			Ret	Ret					16	Ret					4
30	(Netherlands) Barry Veneman	BMW					13	17																					3
31	(United Kingdom) Jon Kirkham	Suzuki																	14	15									3
32	(Hungary) Viktor Kispataki	Honda															19	15											1
33	(United Kingdom) Alex Lowes	Honda															15	Ret	Ret	Ret									1
34	(Italy) Fabrizio Lai	Honda							18	15									Ret	16									1
35	(Australia) Bryan Staring	Kawasaki	15	17																									1
	(Australia) Karl Muggeridge	Honda																									18	17	0
	(Japan) Makoto Tamada	Honda																			17	Ret							0
	(Spain) Santiago Barragán	Kawasaki																									20	Ret	0
Pos.	Rider	Bike	AUS (Australia)		EUR (Europe)		NED (Netherlands)		ITA (Italy)		USA (United States)		SMR (San Marino)		SPA (Spain)		CZE (Czech Republic)		GBR (United Kingdom)		GER (Germany)		ITA (Italy)		FRA (France)		POR (Portugal)		Pts

Colour	Result
Gold	Winner
Silver	Second place
Bronze	Third place
Green	Points classification
Blue	Non-points classification
Blue	Non-classified finish (NC)
Purple	Retired, not classified (Ret)
Red	Did not qualify (DNQ)
Red	Did not pre-qualify (DNPQ)
Black	Disqualified (DSQ)
White	Did not start (DNS)
White	Withdrew (WD)
White	Race cancelled (C)
Blank	Did not practice (DNP)
Blank	Did not arrive (DNA)
Blank	Excluded (EX)

**Bold** – Pole position
Italics – Fastest lap

=== Teams' standings ===
Pos.	Team	Bike No.	AUS (Australia)		EUR (Europe)		NED (Netherlands)		ITA (Italy)		USA (United States)		SMR (San Marino)		SPA (Spain)		CZE (Czech Republic)		GBR (United Kingdom)		GER (Germany)		ITA (Italy)		FRA (France)		POR (Portugal)		Pts.
Pos.	Team	Bike No.	R1	R2	R1	R2	R1	R2	R1	R2	R1	R2	R1	R2	R1	R2	R1	R2	R1	R2	R1	R2	R1	R2	R1	R2	R1	R2	Pts.
1	(Japan) Yamaha World Superbike Team	33	5	3	1	2	4	Ret	4	2	10	6	3	Ret	**1**	**2**	1	2	3	3	2	6	8	6	2	2	6	1	698
1	(Japan) Yamaha World Superbike Team	58	4	15	Ret	14	7	6	1	1	5	4	5	13	4	6	5	5	2	2	4	5	5	4	5	3	19	2	698
2	(Italy) Aprilia Alitalia Racing Team	3	2	2	7	DSQ	2	2	**2**	**8**	Ret	3	2	2	2	1	**2**	**1**	11	4	DNS	DNS					4	7	511
2	(Italy) Aprilia Alitalia Racing Team	2	13	6	8	3	Ret	4	8	Ret	4	2	6	Ret	3	8	7	Ret	15	5	8	Ret	15	3	4	6	12	6	511
3	(Italy) Althea Racing	7	**1**	**1**	**3**	**1**	**3**	**1**	9	10	**1**	**1**	1	1	Ret	3	3	3	1	1	**1**	**8**	**3**	**1**	1	1	1	4	505
4	(Czech Republic) Team Effenbert-Liberty Racing	50	Ret	DNS	11	11	Ret	10	12	7	3	7	7	7	11	11	20	9	6	6	6	2	6	7	6	5	2	5	337
4	(Czech Republic) Team Effenbert-Liberty Racing	96	7	11	2	8	Ret	9	10	Ret	2	8	Ret	Ret	Ret	Ret	11	Ret	Ret	11	Ret	3	7	Ret	Ret	DNS	10	13	337
5	(Germany) BMW Motorrad Motorsport	91	3	5	4	4	12	5	3	Ret	8	13	Ret	5	9	9	8	7	4	8	5	9	Ret	5	3	4	9	15	311
5	(Germany) BMW Motorrad Motorsport	11	10	19	9	13	6	Ret	7	5	13	Ret	Ret	DNS	10	Ret			9	Ret	15	12	12	Ret	9	9	14	16	311
6	(Netherlands) Castrol Honda	4	12	4	5	6	1	3	6	Ret	Ret	11	DNS	DNS							10	4	1	Ret	**Ret**	**Ret**	**3**	**3**	220
6	(Netherlands) Castrol Honda	111	16	10	12	10	8	14	15	12	Ret	18	11	8	16	Ret	Ret	DNS					17	11	DNS	DNS			220
6	(Netherlands) Castrol Honda	22															15	Ret	Ret	Ret									220
6	(Netherlands) Castrol Honda	32																	Ret	16									220
6	(Netherlands) Castrol Honda	100																			17	Ret							220
6	(Netherlands) Castrol Honda	31																									18	17	220
7	(Italy) BMW Motorrad Italia SBK Team	86	14	Ret	13	9	9	15	11	6	7	9	8	4	8	10	6	6	10	10	9	7	9	10	Ret	8	13	9	203
7	(Italy) BMW Motorrad Italia SBK Team	52	17	14					DNS	DNS	15	DNS					WD	WD	12	13	13	Ret							203
7	(Italy) BMW Motorrad Italia SBK Team	112																					Ret	14	11	11	Ret	19	203
7	(Italy) BMW Motorrad Italia SBK Team	57											15	11	Ret	15	17	13											203
7	(Italy) BMW Motorrad Italia SBK Team	37					13	17																					203
8	(Italy) PATA Racing Team Aprilia	41	9	7	6	17	Ret	8	16	4	9	Ret	Ret	3	6	7	12	10	Ret	Ret	3	Ret	2	2	7	10	15	11	176
9	(Japan) Kawasaki Racing Team	17	Ret	Ret	10	5	11	12	Ret	9	14	12	9	9	7	5	9	8	7	Ret	7	11	10	8	8	7	5	8	175
9	(Japan) Kawasaki Racing Team	77			DNS	DNS	Ret	DNS	DNS	DNS			14	10	12	14	18	DNS											175
10	(Belgium) Team Suzuki Alstare	84	6	8	Ret	7	5	7	5	3	Ret	5	Ret	6	Ret	4	4	4	Ret	9	16	Ret	Ret	Ret	12	Ret	11	14	152
11	(Japan) Kawasaki Racing Team Superbike	66	8	9	Ret	12	14	11	13	11	6	10	**4**	**14**	5	Ret	10	14	DNS	DNS	11	1	4	Ret	10	Ret	8	Ret	141
12	(Italy) Team Pedercini	44	11	12	14	15	Ret	16	Ret	13	17	16	Ret	12	14	13	14	11	13	Ret	14	13	18	Ret	13	Ret			78
12	(Italy) Team Pedercini	8	19	16	15	16	10	18	17	14	16	17	Ret	Ret	15	12	16	12	Ret	14	12	Ret	11	9	Ret	Ret	17	20	78
12	(Italy) Team Pedercini	51																									20	Ret	78
13	(Italy) Supersonic Racing Team	121	20	18	Ret	Ret	Ret	13	14	Ret	11	14	10	Ret	13	Ret	13	Ret	8	12	Ret	10	Ret	13	Ret	12	7	10	64
Pos.	Team	Bike No.	AUS (Australia)		EUR (Europe)		NED (Netherlands)		ITA (Italy)		USA (United States)		SMR (San Marino)		SPA (Spain)		CZE (Czech Republic)		GBR (United Kingdom)		GER (Germany)		ITA (Italy)		FRA (France)		POR (Portugal)		Pts.

=== Manufacturers' standings ===
Pos.	Manufacturer	AUS (Australia)		EUR (Europe)		NED (Netherlands)		ITA (Italy)		USA (United States)		SMR (San Marino)		SPA (Spain)		CZE (Czech Republic)		GBR (United Kingdom)		GER (Germany)		ITA (Italy)		FRA (France)		POR (Portugal)		Pts
Pos.	Manufacturer	R1	R2	R1	R2	R1	R2	R1	R2	R1	R2	R1	R2	R1	R2	R1	R2	R1	R2	R1	R2	R1	R2	R1	R2	R1	R2	Pts
1	(Italy) Ducati	1	1	2	1	3	1	9	7	1	1	1	1	11	3	3	3	1	1	1	2	3	1	1	1	1	4	529
2	(Japan) Yamaha	4	3	1	2	4	6	1	1	5	4	3	13	1	2	1	2	2	2	2	5	5	4	2	2	6	1	450
3	(Italy) Aprilia	2	2	6	3	2	2	2	4	4	2	2	2	2	1	2	1	11	4	3	Ret	2	2	4	6	4	6	422
4	(Germany) BMW	3	5	4	4	6	5	3	5	7	9	8	4	8	9	6	6	4	8	5	7	9	5	3	4	9	9	275
5	(Japan) Kawasaki	8	9	10	5	10	11	13	9	6	10	4	9	5	5	9	8	7	14	7	1	4	8	8	7	5	8	228
6	(Japan) Honda	12	4	5	6	1	3	6	12	Ret	11	11	8	16	Ret	15	15	Ret	16	10	4	1	11	Ret	Ret	3	3	194
7	(Japan) Suzuki	6	8	Ret	7	5	7	5	3	12	5	Ret	6	Ret	4	4	4	5	7	16	Ret	Ret	Ret	12	Ret	11	14	169
Pos.	Manufacturer	AUS (Australia)		EUR (Europe)		NED (Netherlands)		ITA (Italy)		USA (United States)		SMR (San Marino)		SPA (Spain)		CZE (Czech Republic)		GBR (United Kingdom)		GER (Germany)		ITA (Italy)		FRA (France)		POR (Portugal)		Pts
