= 2011 Assen Superbike World Championship round =

Superbike race

(Netherlands) 2011 Assen Superbike World Championship round
Round details
- Round 3 of 13 rounds in the 2011 Superbike World Championship. and Round 3 of 12 rounds in the 2011 Supersport World Championship.
- Date: April 17, 2011
- Location: Assen
- Course: Permanent racing facility 4.542 km (2.822 mi)

Superbike World Championship
Pole position
(Spain) Carlos Checa
1:35.292
Fastest lap race 1	Fastest lap race 2
(United Kingdom) Tom Sykes	(United Kingdom) Leon Camier
1:36.660	1:36.476

Supersport World Championship
Pole position
(Italy) Luca Scassa
1:38.008
Fastest lap
(Italy) Luca Scassa
1:39.019

The 2011 Assen Superbike World Championship round was the third round of the 2011 Superbike World Championship. It took place on the weekend of April 15–17, 2011 at the TT Circuit Assen located in Assen, Netherlands.

== Classification ==
=== Superbike race 1 classification ===
Pos.	No.	Rider	Bike	Laps	Time/Retired	Grid	Points
1	4	(United Kingdom) Jonathan Rea	Honda CBR1000RR	22	35:46.486	5	25
2	1	(Italy) Max Biaggi	Aprilia RSV4 Factory	22	+0.739	6	20
3	7	(Spain) Carlos Checa	Ducati 1098R	22	+3.572	1	16
4	33	(Italy) Marco Melandri	Yamaha YZF-R1	22	+9.508	8	13
5	84	(Italy) Michel Fabrizio	Suzuki GSX-R1000	22	+9.892	13	11
6	11	(Australia) Troy Corser	BMW S1000RR	22	+11.120	10	10
7	58	(Republic of Ireland) Eugene Laverty	Yamaha YZF-R1	22	+15.235	3	9
8	111	(Spain) Rubén Xaus	Honda CBR1000RR	22	+30.081	14	8
9	86	(Italy) Ayrton Badovini	BMW S1000RR	22	+32.071	16	7
10	8	(Australia) Mark Aitchison	Kawasaki ZX-10R	22	+35.000	21	6
11	17	(Spain) Joan Lascorz	Kawasaki ZX-10R	22	+43.287	11	5
12	91	(United Kingdom) Leon Haslam	BMW S1000RR	22	+45.289	12	4
13	37	(Netherlands) Barry Veneman	BMW S1000RR	22	+45.298	19	3
14	66	(United Kingdom) Tom Sykes	Kawasaki ZX-10R	22	+50.764	7	2
Ret	96	(Czech Republic) Jakub Smrž	Ducati 1098R	18	Accident	2	
Ret	50	(France) Sylvain Guintoli	Ducati 1098R	18	Accident	15	
Ret	2	(United Kingdom) Leon Camier	Aprilia RSV4 Factory	17	Retirement	9	
Ret	121	(France) Maxime Berger	Ducati 1098R	10	Retirement	17	
Ret	77	(Australia) Chris Vermeulen	Kawasaki ZX-10R	8	Retirement	18	
Ret	41	(Japan) Noriyuki Haga	Aprilia RSV4 Factory	6	Retirement	4	
Ret	44	(Italy) Roberto Rolfo	Kawasaki ZX-10R	3	Accident	20	

=== Superbike race 2 classification ===
Pos.	No.	Rider	Bike	Laps	Time/Retired	Grid	Points
1	7	(Spain) Carlos Checa	Ducati 1098R	22	35:38.693	1	25
2	1	(Italy) Max Biaggi	Aprilia RSV4 Factory	22	+0.524	6	20
3	4	(United Kingdom) Jonathan Rea	Honda CBR1000RR	22	+3.584	5	16
4	2	(United Kingdom) Leon Camier	Aprilia RSV4 Factory	22	+5.913	9	13
5	91	(United Kingdom) Leon Haslam	BMW S1000RR	22	+16.916	12	11
6	58	(Republic of Ireland) Eugene Laverty	Yamaha YZF-R1	22	+17.375	3	10
7	84	(Italy) Michel Fabrizio	Suzuki GSX-R1000	22	+17.740	13	9
8	41	(Japan) Noriyuki Haga	Aprilia RSV4 Factory	22	+18.329	4	8
9	96	(Czech Republic) Jakub Smrž	Ducati 1098R	22	+18.378	2	7
10	50	(France) Sylvain Guintoli	Ducati 1098R	22	+18.404	15	6
11	66	(United Kingdom) Tom Sykes	Kawasaki ZX-10R	22	+26.284	7	5
12	17	(Spain) Joan Lascorz	Kawasaki ZX-10R	22	+27.053	11	4
13	121	(France) Maxime Berger	Ducati 1098R	22	+38.614	17	3
14	111	(Spain) Rubén Xaus	Honda CBR1000RR	22	+40.824	14	2
15	86	(Italy) Ayrton Badovini	BMW S1000RR	22	+40.953	16	1
16	44	(Italy) Roberto Rolfo	Kawasaki ZX-10R	22	+40.982	19	
17	37	(Netherlands) Barry Veneman	BMW S1000RR	22	+45.423	18	
18	8	(Australia) Mark Aitchison	Kawasaki ZX-10R	19	+3 laps	20	
Ret	33	(Italy) Marco Melandri	Yamaha YZF-R1	16	Accident	8	
Ret	11	(Australia) Troy Corser	BMW S1000RR	7	Accident	10	
DNS	77	(Australia) Chris Vermeulen	Kawasaki ZX-10R		Did not start		

=== Supersport race classification ===
Pos.	No.	Rider	Bike	Laps	Time/Retired	Grid	Points
1	7	(United Kingdom) Chaz Davies	Yamaha YZF-R6	16	26:37.029	6	25
2	99	(France) Fabien Foret	Honda CBR600RR	16	+7.236	4	20
3	23	(Australia) Broc Parkes	Kawasaki ZX-6R	16	+8.084	3	16
4	127	(Denmark) Robbin Harms	Honda CBR600RR	16	+8.191	9	13
5	44	(Spain) David Salom	Kawasaki ZX-6R	16	+9.122	7	11
6	55	(Italy) Massimo Roccoli	Kawasaki ZX-6R	16	+9.222	10	10
7	77	(United Kingdom) James Ellison	Honda CBR600RR	16	+14.616	12	9
8	117	(Portugal) Miguel Praia	Honda CBR600RR	16	+32.623	14	8
9	60	(Ukraine) Vladimir Ivanov	Honda CBR600RR	16	+40.668	16	7
10	38	(Hungary) Balázs Németh	Honda CBR600RR	16	+40.727	24	6
11	10	(Hungary) Imre Tóth	Honda CBR600RR	16	+41.439	23	5
12	28	(Poland) Paweł Szkopek	Honda CBR600RR	16	+54.039	22	4
13	8	(Switzerland) Bastien Chesaux	Honda CBR600RR	16	+56.749	25	3
14	91	(Italy) Danilo Dell'Omo	Triumph Daytona 675	16	+57.345	21	2
15	95	(Romania) Robert Mureșan	Honda CBR600RR	16	+1:03.893	28	1
16	4	(United Kingdom) Gino Rea	Honda CBR600RR	16	+1:14.746	11	
17	33	(Austria) Yves Polzer	Yamaha YZF-R6	16	+1:15.031	29	
18	19	(Australia) Mitchell Pirotta	Honda CBR600RR	16	+1:24.870	30	
Ret	57	(Netherlands) Kervin Bos	Yamaha YZF-R6	14	Retirement	19	
Ret	31	(Italy) Vittorio Iannuzzo	Kawasaki ZX-6R	11	Accident	15	
Ret	53	(Netherlands) Jos van der Aa	Yamaha YZF-R6	11	Accident	20	
Ret	21	(France) Florian Marino	Honda CBR600RR	8	Retirement	5	
Ret	9	(Italy) Luca Scassa	Yamaha YZF-R6	7	Accident	1	
Ret	87	(Italy) Luca Marconi	Yamaha YZF-R6	7	Accident	27	
Ret	34	(South Africa) Ronan Quarmby	Triumph Daytona 675	4	Retirement	17	
Ret	69	(Czech Republic) Ondřej Ježek	Honda CBR600RR	1	Accident	18	
DNS	11	(United Kingdom) Sam Lowes	Honda CBR600RR	0	Did not restart	2	
DNS	5	(Sweden) Alexander Lundh	Honda CBR600RR	0	Did not restart	13	
DNS	25	(Slovenia) Marko Jerman	Triumph Daytona 675	0	Did not restart	26	
DSQ	22	(Italy) Roberto Tamburini	Yamaha YZF-R6	16	Disqualified	8	
DNQ	73	(Russia) Oleg Pozdneev	Yamaha YZF-R6		Did not qualify		
DNQ	24	(Russia) Eduard Blokhin	Yamaha YZF-R6		Did not qualify		
OFFICIAL SUPERSPORT RACE REPORT

== Superstock 1000 race classification ==
Pos.	No.	Rider	Bike	Laps	Time/Retired	Grid	Points
1	34	(Italy) Davide Giugliano	Ducati 1098R	13	21:40.213	2	25
2	9	(Italy) Danilo Petrucci	Ducati 1098R	13	+0.212	3	20
3	20	(France) Sylvain Barrier	BMW S1000RR	13	+5.346	1	16
4	14	(Italy) Lorenzo Baroni	Ducati 1098R	13	+8.975	4	13
5	67	(Australia) Bryan Staring	Kawasaki ZX-10R	13	+10.505	13	11
6	8	(Italy) Andrea Antonelli	Honda CBR1000RR	13	+10.568	6	10
7	47	(Italy) Eddi La Marra	Honda CBR1000RR	13	+10.591	9	9
8	71	(Netherlands) Roy Ten Napel	Honda CBR1000RR	13	+11.452	5	8
9	87	(Italy) Lorenzo Zanetti	BMW S1000RR	13	+11.519	8	7
10	59	(Italy) Niccolò Canepa	Kawasaki ZX-10R	13	+14.272	16	6
11	32	(South Africa) Sheridan Morais	Kawasaki ZX-10R	13	+14.599	7	5
12	11	(France) Jérémy Guarnoni	Yamaha YZF-R1	13	+14.629	17	4
13	23	(Italy) Luca Verdini	Honda CBR1000RR	13	+21.331	11	3
14	5	(Italy) Marco Bussolotti	Kawasaki ZX-10R	13	+21.382	12	2
15	6	(Italy) Lorenzo Savadori	Kawasaki ZX-10R	13	+21.636	10	1
16	15	(Italy) Fabio Massei	BMW S1000RR	13	+21.699	15	
17	21	(Germany) Markus Reiterberger	BMW S1000RR	13	+21.990	14	
18	12	(Italy) Nico Vivarelli	Kawasaki ZX-10R	13	+30.998	20	
19	93	(France) Matheiu Lussiana	BMW S1000RR	13	+37.771	22	
20	86	(Australia) Beau Beaton	BMW S1000RR	13	+42.613	23	
21	29	(Italy) Daniele Beretta	Honda CBR1000RR	13	+42.716	19	
22	40	(Hungary) Alen Győrfi	Honda CBR1000RR	13	+43.241	26	
23	55	(Slovakia) Tomáš Svitok	Ducati 1098R	13	+43.318	24	
24	120	(Poland) Marcin Walkowiak	Honda CBR1000RR	13	+50.556	25	
25	39	(France) Randy Pagaud	BMW S1000RR	13	+55.610	27	
26	27	(Switzerland) Thomas Caiani	Kawasaki ZX-10R	13	+1:24.756	28	
Ret	36	(Argentina) Leandro Mercado	Kawasaki ZX-10R	2	Accident	18	
Ret	37	(Italy) Andrea Boscoscuro	Ducati 1098R	0	Accident	21	
DNQ	30	(Romania) Bogdan Vrăjitoru	Yamaha YZF-R1		Did not qualify		

== Superstock 600 race classification ==
Pos.	No.	Rider	Bike	Laps	Time/Retired	Grid	Points
1	60	(Netherlands) Michael Van Der Mark	Honda CBR600RR	12	20:23.765	3	25
2	98	(France) Romain Lanusse	Yamaha YZF-R6	12	+0.540	2	20
3	3	(Australia) Jed Metcher	Yamaha YZF-R6	12	+0.590	1	16
4	13	(Italy) Dino Lombardi	Yamaha YZF-R6	12	+8.960	6	13
5	75	(Italy) Francesco Cocco	Yamaha YZF-R6	12	+10.854	11	11
6	10	(Spain) Nacho Calero	Yamaha YZF-R6	12	+16.024	9	10
7	84	(Italy) Riccardo Russo	Yamaha YZF-R6	12	+16.315	12	9
8	52	(Belgium) Gauthier Duwelz	Yamaha YZF-R6	12	+16.322	7	8
9	4	(United States) Joshua Day	Kawasaki ZX-6R	12	+16.332	10	7
10	59	(Denmark) Alex Schacht	Honda CBR600RR	12	+16.801	5	6
11	8	(United Kingdom) Joshua Elliott	Yamaha YZF-R6	12	+19.589	8	5
12	56	(United States) Austin Dehaven	Yamaha YZF-R6	12	+36.235	18	4
13	23	(Luxembourg) Christophe Ponsson	Yamaha YZF-R6	12	+36.650	14	3
14	78	(Netherlands) Tristan Lentink	Honda CBR600RR	12	+36.750	17	2
15	19	(Slovakia) Tomáš Krajči	Yamaha YZF-R6	12	+43.087	20	1
16	92	(Australia) Adrian Nestorovic	Yamaha YZF-R6	12	+44.487	16	
17	17	(Italy) Luca Salvadori	Yamaha YZF-R6	12	+44.874	19	
18	99	(Netherlands) Tony Coveña	Yamaha YZF-R6	12	+49.107	21	
19	26	(Romania) Mircea Vrajitoru	Yamaha YZF-R6	12	+55.411	22	
20	64	(Italy) Riccardo Cecchini	Triumph Daytona 675	12	+1:02.849	23	
Ret	69	(France) Nelson Major	Yamaha YZF-R6	6	Retirement	4	
Ret	18	(Italy) Christian Gamarino	Kawasaki ZX-6R	3	Accident	15	
DNS	43	(France) Stéphane Egea	Yamaha YZF-R6	0	Did not start	13	
DNS	71	(United Kingdom) Max Wadsworth	Yamaha YZF-R6		Did not start		
