= 2011 Portimão Superbike World Championship round =

2011 Portugal Superbike World Championship round
Round details
- Round 13 of 13 rounds in the 2011 Superbike World Championship. and Round 12 of 12 rounds in the 2011 Supersport World Championship.
- Date: October 16, 2011
- Location: Autódromo Internacional do Algarve
- Course: Permanent racing facility 4.592 km (2.853 mi)

Superbike World Championship
Pole position
(United Kingdom) Jonathan Rea
1:41.712
Fastest lap race 1	Fastest lap race 2
(France) Sylvain Guintoli	(Spain) Joan Lascorz
1:43.453	1:43.553

Supersport World Championship
Pole position
(Spain) David Salom
1:45.095
Fastest lap
(United Kingdom) James Ellison
1:45.638

The 2011 Portimão Superbike World Championship round was the thirteenth and final round of the 2011 Superbike World Championship. It took place on the weekend of October 14–16, 2011 at Autódromo Internacional do Algarve, Portimão, Portugal.

== Results ==
=== Superbike race 1 classification ===
Pos.	No.	Rider	Bike	Laps	Time/Retired	Grid	Points
1	7	(Spain) Carlos Checa	Ducati 1098R	22	38:13.293	2	25
2	50	(France) Sylvain Guintoli	Ducati 1098R	22	+2.860	5	20
3	4	(United Kingdom) Jonathan Rea	Honda CBR1000RR	22	+8.481	1	16
4	1	(Italy) Max Biaggi	Aprilia RSV4 Factory	22	+11.963	17	13
5	17	(Spain) Joan Lascorz	Kawasaki ZX-10R	22	+13.333	7	11
6	33	(Italy) Marco Melandri	Yamaha YZF-R1	22	+18.960	4	10
7	121	(France) Maxime Berger	Ducati 1098R	22	+20.489	13	9
8	66	(United Kingdom) Tom Sykes	Kawasaki ZX-10R	22	+25.320	10	8
9	91	(United Kingdom) Leon Haslam	BMW S1000RR	22	+26.695	11	7
10	96	(Czech Republic) Jakub Smrž	Ducati 1098R	22	+26.801	6	6
11	84	(Italy) Michel Fabrizio	Suzuki GSX-R1000	22	+27.115	14	5
12	2	(United Kingdom) Leon Camier	Aprilia RSV4 Factory	22	+28.563	12	4
13	86	(Italy) Ayrton Badovini	BMW S1000RR	22	+31.765	9	3
14	11	(Australia) Troy Corser	BMW S1000RR	22	+31.822	18	2
15	41	(Japan) Noriyuki Haga	Aprilia RSV4 Factory	22	+31.866	8	1
16	34	(Italy) Davide Giugliano	Ducati 1098R	22	+47.694	15	
17	8	(Australia) Mark Aitchison	Kawasaki ZX-10R	22	+47.737	16	
18	31	(Australia) Karl Muggeridge	Honda CBR1000RR	22	+1:06.213	19	
19	58	(Republic of Ireland) Eugene Laverty	Yamaha YZF-R1	20	+2 laps	3	
20	51	(Spain) Santiago Barragán	Kawasaki ZX-10R	19	+3 laps	22	
21	12	(Australia) Joshua Waters	Suzuki GSX-R1000	18	+4 laps	21	
Ret	112	(Spain) Javier Forés	BMW S1000RR	15	Technical problem	20	
OFFICIAL SUPERBIKE RACE 1 REPORT

=== Superbike race 2 classification ===
Pos.	No.	Rider	Bike	Laps	Time/Retired	Grid	Points
1	33	(Italy) Marco Melandri	Yamaha YZF-R1	22	38:11.326	4	25
2	58	(Republic of Ireland) Eugene Laverty	Yamaha YZF-R1	22	+1.075	3	20
3	4	(United Kingdom) Jonathan Rea	Honda CBR1000RR	22	+1.363	1	16
4	7	(Spain) Carlos Checa	Ducati 1098R	22	+2.648	2	13
5	50	(France) Sylvain Guintoli	Ducati 1098R	22	+3.355	5	11
6	2	(United Kingdom) Leon Camier	Aprilia RSV4 Factory	22	+4.709	12	10
7	1	(Italy) Max Biaggi	Aprilia RSV4 Factory	22	+6.514	17	9
8	17	(Spain) Joan Lascorz	Kawasaki ZX-10R	22	+14.441	7	8
9	86	(Italy) Ayrton Badovini	BMW S1000RR	22	+19.128	9	7
10	121	(France) Maxime Berger	Ducati 1098R	22	+25.527	13	6
11	41	(Japan) Noriyuki Haga	Aprilia RSV4 Factory	22	+26.400	8	5
12	34	(Italy) Davide Giugliano	Ducati 1098R	22	+26.646	15	4
13	96	(Czech Republic) Jakub Smrž	Ducati 1098R	22	+26.963	6	3
14	84	(Italy) Michel Fabrizio	Suzuki GSX-R1000	22	+30.209	14	2
15	91	(United Kingdom) Leon Haslam	BMW S1000RR	22	+30.951	11	1
16	11	(Australia) Troy Corser	BMW S1000RR	22	+31.057	18	
17	31	(Australia) Karl Muggeridge	Honda CBR1000RR	22	+57.941	19	
18	12	(Australia) Joshua Waters	Suzuki GSX-R1000	22	+58.577	21	
19	112	(Spain) Javier Forés	BMW S1000RR	22	+1:04.011	20	
20	8	(Australia) Mark Aitchison	Kawasaki ZX-10R	22	+1:04.397	16	
Ret	66	(United Kingdom) Tom Sykes	Kawasaki ZX-10R	17	Retirement	10	
Ret	51	(Spain) Santiago Barragán	Kawasaki ZX-10R	9	Retirement	22	
OFFICIAL SUPERBIKE RACE 2 REPORT

=== Supersport race classification ===
Pos.	No.	Rider	Bike	Laps	Time/Retired	Grid	Points
1	7	(United Kingdom) Chaz Davies	Yamaha YZF-R6	20	35:31.062	3	25
2	44	(Spain) David Salom	Kawasaki ZX-6R	20	+1.253	1	20
3	77	(United Kingdom) James Ellison	Honda CBR600RR	20	+1.415	10	16
4	9	(Italy) Luca Scassa	Yamaha YZF-R6	20	+5.522	8	13
5	21	(France) Florian Marino	Honda CBR600RR	20	+21.658	4	11
6	22	(Italy) Roberto Tamburini	Yamaha YZF-R6	20	+24.490	12	10
7	55	(Italy) Massimo Roccoli	Kawasaki ZX-6R	20	+25.506	5	9
8	117	(Portugal) Miguel Praia	Honda CBR600RR	20	+32.271	13	8
9	65	(Russia) Vladimir Leonov	Yamaha YZF-R6	20	+32.660	18	7
10	38	(Hungary) Balázs Németh	Honda CBR600RR	20	+32.680	17	6
11	31	(Italy) Vittorio Iannuzzo	Kawasaki ZX-6R	20	+34.732	15	5
12	99	(France) Fabien Foret	Honda CBR600RR	20	+35.109	7	4
13	5	(Sweden) Alexander Lundh	Honda CBR600RR	20	+51.652	19	3
14	4	(United Kingdom) Gino Rea	Honda CBR600RR	20	+54.002	9	2
15	28	(Poland) Paweł Szkopek	Honda CBR600RR	20	+54.400	16	1
16	8	(Switzerland) Bastien Chesaux	Honda CBR600RR	20	+57.653	23	
17	87	(Italy) Luca Marconi	Yamaha YZF-R6	20	+57.933	25	
18	25	(Slovenia) Marko Jerman	Triumph Daytona 675	20	+58.900	30	
19	76	(Austria) Günther Knobloch	Yamaha YZF-R6	20	+1:04.473	21	
20	6	(Italy) Gianluca Vizziello	Honda CBR600RR	20	+1:14.703	26	
21	37	(Austria) David Linortner	Yamaha YZF-R6	20	+1:14.703	29	
22	30	(Switzerland) Thomas Caiani	Honda CBR600RR	20	+1:38.076	27	
23	78	(Ukraine) Konstantin Pisarev	Honda CBR600RR	20	+1:51.837	31	
24	24	(Russia) Eduard Blokhin	Yamaha YZF-R6	19	+1 lap	32	
Ret	91	(Italy) Danilo Dell'Omo	Triumph Daytona 675	19	Accident	14	
Ret	34	(South Africa) Ronan Quarmby	Triumph Daytona 675	17	Retirement	11	
Ret	88	(United Kingdom) Luke Stapleford	Kawasaki ZX-6R	17	Accident	28	
Ret	11	(United Kingdom) Sam Lowes	Honda CBR600RR	11	Retirement	6	
Ret	3	(Germany) Jesco Günther	Yamaha YZF-R6	5	Accident	22	
Ret	127	(Denmark) Robbin Harms	Honda CBR600RR	4	Retirement	20	
Ret	23	(Australia) Broc Parkes	Kawasaki ZX-6R	2	Retirement	2	
Ret	10	(Hungary) Imre Tóth	Honda CBR600RR	0	Technical problem	24	
DNS	69	(Czech Republic) Ondřej Ježek	Honda CBR600RR		Did not start		
DNQ	73	(Russia) Oleg Pozdneev	Yamaha YZF-R6		Did not qualify		
OFFICIAL SUPERSPORT RACE REPORT

=== Superstock 1000 race classification ===
Pos.	No.	Rider	Bike	Laps	Time/Retired	Grid	Points
1	9	(Italy) Danilo Petrucci	Ducati 1098R	11	19:31.819	1	25
2	20	(France) Sylvain Barrier	BMW S1000RR	11	+8.019	5	20
3	32	(South Africa) Sheridan Morais	Kawasaki ZX-10R	11	+8.115	4	16
4	67	(Australia) Bryan Staring	Kawasaki ZX-10R	11	+8.364	7	13
5	87	(Italy) Lorenzo Zanetti	BMW S1000RR	11	+9.354	11	11
6	8	(Italy) Andrea Antonelli	Honda CBR1000RR	11	+9.466	10	10
7	65	(France) Loris Baz	Honda CBR1000RR	11	+9.664	2	9
8	15	(Italy) Fabio Massei	BMW S1000RR	11	+16.030	9	8
9	5	(Italy) Marco Bussolotti	Kawasaki ZX-10R	11	+17.276	14	7
10	17	(Canada) Brett McCormick	BMW S1000RR	11	+18.267	15	6
11	21	(Germany) Markus Reiterberger	BMW S1000RR	11	+18.290	17	5
12	14	(Italy) Lorenzo Baroni	Ducati 1098R	11	+20.539	6	4
13	36	(Argentina) Leandro Mercado	Kawasaki ZX-10R	11	+26.466	19	3
14	31	(Sweden) Christoffer Bergman	Kawasaki ZX-10R	11	+27.637	13	2
15	7	(Spain) Dani Rivas	Kawasaki ZX-10R	11	+28.682	24	1
16	4	(United States) Taylor Knapp	Kawasaki ZX-10R	11	+28.849	20	
17	86	(Australia) Beau Beaton	BMW S1000RR	11	+32.270	18	
18	74	(Brazil) Danilo Andric Silva	BMW S1000RR	11	+35.577	23	
19	40	(Hungary) Alen Győrfi	Honda CBR1000RR	11	+39.242	26	
20	55	(Slovakia) Tomáš Svitok	Ducati 1098R	11	+39.322	21	
21	71	(Netherlands) Roy Ten Napel	Honda CBR1000RR	11	+56.110	27	
22	133	(Poland) Marek Szkopek	Honda CBR1000RR	11	+59.344	28	
23	39	(France) Randy Pagaud	BMW S1000RR	11	+59.537	25	
24	141	(Portugal) Sérgio Batista	Kawasaki ZX-10R	11	+1:08.612	29	
Ret	11	(France) Jérémy Guarnoni	Yamaha YZF-R1	9	Accident	12	
Ret	107	(Italy) Niccolò Rosso	Kawasaki ZX-10R	8	Retirement	22	
Ret	6	(Italy) Lorenzo Savadori	Kawasaki ZX-10R	5	Retirement	8	
Ret	93	(France) Mathieu Lussiana	BMW S1000RR	3	Retirement	16	
Ret	59	(Italy) Niccolò Canepa	Ducati 1098R	1	Retirement	3	
OFFICIAL SUPERSTOCK 1000 RACE REPORT
