= 2011 Phillip Island Superbike World Championship round =

(Australia) 2011 Phillip Island Superbike World Championship round
Round details
- Round 1 of 13 rounds in the 2011 Superbike World Championship. and Round 1 of 12 rounds in the 2011 Supersport World Championship.
- Date: 27 February, 2011
- Location: Phillip Island
- Course: Permanent racing facility 4.445 km (2.762 mi)

Superbike World Championship
Pole position
(Spain) Carlos Checa
1:30.882
Fastest lap race 1	Fastest lap race 2
(Italy) Max Biaggi	(Italy) Max Biaggi
1:32.034	1:32.012

Supersport World Championship
Pole position
(Spain) David Salom
1:34.070
Fastest lap
(France) Fabien Foret
1:34.941

The 2011 Phillip Island Superbike World Championship round was the first round of the 2011 Superbike World Championship season. It took place over the weekend of 25–27 February 2011 at the Phillip Island Grand Prix Circuit near Cowes, Victoria, Australia.

== Results ==
=== Superbike Race 1 classification ===
Pos	No	Rider	Bike	Laps	Time	Grid	Points
1	7	(Spain) Carlos Checa	Ducati 1098R	22	34:16.503	1	25
2	1	(Italy) Max Biaggi	Aprilia RSV4 Factory	22	+4.365	2	20
3	91	(United Kingdom) Leon Haslam	BMW S1000RR	22	+10.719	4	16
4	58	(Republic of Ireland) Eugene Laverty	Yamaha YZF-R1	22	+11.266	5	13
5	33	(Italy) Marco Melandri	Yamaha YZF-R1	22	+11.293	8	11
6	84	(Italy) Michel Fabrizio	Suzuki GSX-R1000	22	+12.039	9	10
7	96	(Czech Republic) Jakub Smrž	Ducati 1098R	22	+20.294	6	9
8	66	(United Kingdom) Tom Sykes	Kawasaki ZX-10R	22	+20.742	10	8
9	41	(Japan) Noriyuki Haga	Aprilia RSV4 Factory	22	+22.421	14	7
10	11	(Australia) Troy Corser	BMW S1000RR	22	+25.822	7	6
11	44	(Italy) Roberto Rolfo	Kawasaki ZX-10R	22	+29.270	21	5
12	4	(United Kingdom) Jonathan Rea	Honda CBR1000RR	22	+31.059	12	4
13	2	(United Kingdom) Leon Camier	Aprilia RSV4 Factory	22	+31.721	17	3
14	86	(Italy) Ayrton Badovini	BMW S1000RR	22	+36.389	20	2
15	67	(Australia) Bryan Staring	Kawasaki ZX-10R	22	+36.470	18	1
16	111	(Spain) Rubén Xaus	Honda CBR1000RR	22	+41.928	16	
17	52	(United Kingdom) James Toseland	BMW S1000RR	22	+55.239	15	
18	12	(Australia) Josh Waters	Suzuki GSX-R1000	22	+1:00.312	11	
19	8	(Australia) Mark Aitchison	Kawasaki ZX-10R	22	+1:00.316	22	
20	121	(France) Maxime Berger	Ducati 1098R	22	+1:30.125	19	
Ret	17	(Spain) Joan Lascorz	Kawasaki ZX-10R	13	Accident	13	
Ret	50	(France) Sylvain Guintoli	Ducati 1098R	6	Accident	3	
OFFICIAL SUPERBIKE RACE 1 REPORT

=== Superbike Race 2 classification ===
Pos	No	Rider	Bike	Laps	Time	Grid	Points
1	7	(Spain) Carlos Checa	Ducati 1098R	22	34:15.041	1	25
2	1	(Italy) Max Biaggi	Aprilia RSV4 Factory	22	+1.188	2	20
3	33	(Italy) Marco Melandri	Yamaha YZF-R1	22	+1.406	7	16
4	4	(United Kingdom) Jonathan Rea	Honda CBR1000RR	22	+10.563	11	13
5	91	(United Kingdom) Leon Haslam	BMW S1000RR	22	+10.885	3	11
6	2	(United Kingdom) Leon Camier	Aprilia RSV4 Factory	22	+16.914	16	10
7	41	(Japan) Noriyuki Haga	Aprilia RSV4 Factory	22	+17.558	13	9
8	84	(Italy) Michel Fabrizio	Suzuki GSX-R1000	22	+17.679	8	8
9	66	(United Kingdom) Tom Sykes	Kawasaki ZX-10R	22	+18.070	9	7
10	111	(Spain) Rubén Xaus	Honda CBR1000RR	22	+19.053	15	6
11	96	(Czech Republic) Jakub Smrž	Ducati 1098R	22	+19.060	5	5
12	44	(Italy) Roberto Rolfo	Kawasaki ZX-10R	22	+23.771	20	4
13	12	(Australia) Josh Waters	Suzuki GSX-R1000	22	+23.956	10	3
14	52	(United Kingdom) James Toseland	BMW S1000RR	22	+28.713	14	2
15	58	(Republic of Ireland) Eugene Laverty	Yamaha YZF-R1	22	+32.673	4	1
16	8	(Australia) Mark Aitchison	Kawasaki ZX-10R	22	+33.226	21	
17	67	(Australia) Bryan Staring	Kawasaki ZX-10R	22	+42.598	17	
18	121	(France) Maxime Berger	Ducati 1098R	22	+51.819	18	
19	11	(Australia) Troy Corser	BMW S1000RR	22	+55.738	6	
Ret	17	(Spain) Joan Lascorz	Kawasaki ZX-10R	14	Retirement	12	
Ret	86	(Italy) Ayrton Badovini	BMW S1000RR	0	Retirement	19	
DNS	50	(France) Sylvain Guintoli	Ducati 1098R		Did not start		
OFFICIAL SUPERBIKE RACE 2 REPORT

=== Supersport race classification ===
Pos	No	Rider	Bike	Laps	Time	Grid	Points
1	9	(Italy) Luca Scassa	Yamaha YZF-R6	21	33:34.739	5	25
2	23	(Australia) Broc Parkes	Kawasaki ZX-6R	21	+0.009	4	20
3	11	(United Kingdom) Sam Lowes	Honda CBR600RR	21	+0.033	3	16
4	44	(Spain) David Salom	Kawasaki ZX-6R	21	+0.272	1	13
5	127	(Denmark) Robbin Harms	Honda CBR600RR	21	+16.969	9	11
6	77	(United Kingdom) James Ellison	Honda CBR600RR	21	+23.943	11	10
7	21	(France) Florian Marino	Honda CBR600RR	21	+31.788	7	9
8	31	(Italy) Vittorio Iannuzzo	Kawasaki ZX-6R	21	+31.837	18	8
9	5	(Sweden) Alexander Lundh	Honda CBR600RR	21	+31.870	20	7
10	91	(Italy) Danilo Dell'Omo	Triumph Daytona 675	21	+32.817	13	6
11	34	(South Africa) Ronan Quarmby	Triumph Daytona 675	21	+43.799	17	5
12	69	(Czech Republic) Ondřej Ježek	Honda CBR600RR	21	+56.116	19	4
13	8	(Switzerland) Bastien Chesaux	Honda CBR600RR	21	+1:00.055	21	3
14	38	(Hungary) Balázs Németh	Honda CBR600RR	21	+1:05.999	24	2
15	10	(Hungary) Imre Tóth	Honda CBR600RR	21	+1:06.318	23	1
16	60	(Ukraine) Vladimir Ivanov	Honda CBR600RR	21	+1:14.472	16	
17	25	(Slovenia) Marko Jerman	Triumph Daytona 675	21	+1:24.183	25	
18	7	(United Kingdom) Chaz Davies	Yamaha YZF-R6	20	+1 Lap	8	
19	87	(Italy) Luca Marconi	Yamaha YZF-R6	20	+1 Lap	26	
20	22	(Italy) Roberto Tamburini	Yamaha YZF-R6	20	+1 Lap	6	
Ret	99	(France) Fabien Foret	Honda CBR600RR	15	Retirement	2	
Ret	55	(Italy) Massimo Roccoli	Kawasaki ZX-6R	15	Mechanical	12	
Ret	117	(Portugal) Miguel Praia	Honda CBR600RR	10	Retirement	14	
Ret	28	(Poland) Paweł Szkopek	Honda CBR600RR	10	Retirement	15	
Ret	4	(United Kingdom) Gino Rea	Honda CBR600RR	5	Retirement	10	
Ret	19	(Australia) Mitchell Pirotta	Honda CBR600RR	1	Retirement	22	
OFFICIAL SUPERSPORT RACE REPORT
