= 2011 Donington Superbike World Championship round =

(United Kingdom) 2011 Donington Superbike World Championship round
Round details
- Round 2 of 13 rounds in the 2011 Superbike World Championship. and Round 2 of 12 rounds in the 2011 Supersport World Championship.
- Date: March 27, 2011
- Location: Donington Park
- Course: Permanent racing facility 4.023 km (2.500 mi)

Superbike World Championship
Pole position
(Spain) Carlos Checa
1:28.099
Fastest lap race 1	Fastest lap race 2
(Japan) Noriyuki Haga	(Spain) Carlos Checa
1:29.137	1:28.988

Supersport World Championship
Pole position
(Italy) Luca Scassa
1:31.232
Fastest lap
(United Kingdom) Sam Lowes
1:31.094

The 2011 Donington Superbike World Championship round was the second round of the 2011 Superbike World Championship. It took place on the weekend of March 25–27, 2011 at Donington Park.

== Results ==
=== Superbike race 1 classification ===
Pos.	No.	Rider	Bike	Laps	Time/Retired	Grid	Points
1	33	(Italy) Marco Melandri	Yamaha YZF-R1	23	34:33.189	9	25
2	96	(Czech Republic) Jakub Smrž	Ducati 1098R	23	+2.455	4	20
3	7	(Spain) Carlos Checa	Ducati 1098R	23	+5.839	1	16
4	91	(United Kingdom) Leon Haslam	BMW S1000RR	23	+6.176	2	13
5	4	(United Kingdom) Jonathan Rea	Honda CBR1000RR	23	+9.039	8	11
6	41	(Japan) Noriyuki Haga	Aprilia RSV4 Factory	23	+9.215	5	10
7	1	(Italy) Max Biaggi	Aprilia RSV4 Factory	23	+9.960	6	9
8	2	(United Kingdom) Leon Camier	Aprilia RSV4 Factory	23	+14.860	7	8
9	11	(Australia) Troy Corser	BMW S1000RR	23	+14.877	10	7
10	17	(Spain) Joan Lascorz	Kawasaki ZX-10R	23	+16.182	12	6
11	50	(France) Sylvain Guintoli	Ducati 1098R	23	+25.820	14	5
12	111	(Spain) Rubén Xaus	Honda CBR1000RR	23	+28.378	16	4
13	86	(Italy) Ayrton Badovini	BMW S1000RR	23	+31.869	17	3
14	44	(Italy) Roberto Rolfo	Kawasaki ZX-10R	23	+40.015	18	2
15	8	(Australia) Mark Aitchison	Kawasaki ZX-10R	23	+1:00.128	19	1
Ret	66	(United Kingdom) Tom Sykes	Kawasaki ZX-10R	17	Accident	3	
Ret	84	(Italy) Michel Fabrizio	Suzuki GSX-R1000	14	Retirement	11	
Ret	121	(France) Maxime Berger	Ducati 1098R	5	Accident	15	
Ret	58	(Republic of Ireland) Eugene Laverty	Yamaha YZF-R1	3	Accident	13	
DNS	77	(Australia) Chris Vermeulen	Kawasaki ZX-10R		Did not start		
OFFICIAL SUPERBIKE RACE 1 REPORT

=== Superbike race 2 classification ===
Pos.	No.	Rider	Bike	Laps	Time/Retired	Grid	Points
1	7	(Spain) Carlos Checa	Ducati 1098R	23	34:21.537	1	25
2	33	(Italy) Marco Melandri	Yamaha YZF-R1	23	+3.397	9	20
3	2	(United Kingdom) Leon Camier	Aprilia RSV4 Factory	23	+5.902	7	16
4	91	(United Kingdom) Leon Haslam	BMW S1000RR	23	+13.842	2	13
5	17	(Spain) Joan Lascorz	Kawasaki ZX-10R	23	+14.253	12	11
6	4	(United Kingdom) Jonathan Rea	Honda CBR1000RR	23	+19.413	8	10
7	84	(Italy) Michel Fabrizio	Suzuki GSX-R1000	23	+20.278	11	9
8	96	(Czech Republic) Jakub Smrž	Ducati 1098R	23	+21.160	4	8
9	86	(Italy) Ayrton Badovini	BMW S1000RR	23	+24.298	17	7
10	111	(Spain) Rubén Xaus	Honda CBR1000RR	23	+24.907	16	6
11	50	(France) Sylvain Guintoli	Ducati 1098R	23	+32.440	14	5
12	66	(United Kingdom) Tom Sykes	Kawasaki ZX-10R	23	+32.679	3	4
13	11	(Australia) Troy Corser	BMW S1000RR	23	+34.070	10	3
14	58	(Republic of Ireland) Eugene Laverty	Yamaha YZF-R1	23	+36.418	13	2
15	44	(Italy) Roberto Rolfo	Kawasaki ZX-10R	23	+44.037	18	1
16	8	(Australia) Mark Aitchison	Kawasaki ZX-10R	23	+52.412	19	
17	41	(Japan) Noriyuki Haga	Aprilia RSV4 Factory	23	+56.634	5	
Ret	121	(France) Maxime Berger	Ducati 1098R	1	Accident	15	
DSQ	1	(Italy) Max Biaggi	Aprilia RSV4 Factory	9	Disqualified	6	
DNS	77	(Australia) Chris Vermeulen	Kawasaki ZX-10R		Did not start		
OFFICIAL SUPERBIKE RACE 2 REPORT

=== Supersport race classification ===
Pos.	No.	Rider	Bike	Laps	Time/Retired	Grid	Points
1	9	(Italy) Luca Scassa	Yamaha YZF-R6	22	33:40.762	1	25
2	7	(United Kingdom) Chaz Davies	Yamaha YZF-R6	22	+0.270	2	20
3	4	(United Kingdom) Gino Rea	Honda CBR600RR	22	+20.374	6	16
4	127	(Denmark) Robbin Harms	Honda CBR600RR	22	+23.469	7	13
5	23	(Australia) Broc Parkes	Kawasaki ZX-6R	22	+24.872	4	11
6	44	(Spain) David Salom	Kawasaki ZX-6R	22	+32.001	5	10
7	55	(Italy) Massimo Roccoli	Kawasaki ZX-6R	22	+42.128	10	9
8	21	(France) Florian Marino	Honda CBR600RR	22	+43.826	9	8
9	31	(Italy) Vittorio Iannuzzo	Kawasaki ZX-6R	22	+52.936	13	7
10	5	(Sweden) Alexander Lundh	Honda CBR600RR	22	+55.956	14	6
11	117	(Portugal) Miguel Praia	Honda CBR600RR	22	+1:00.717	19	5
12	22	(Italy) Roberto Tamburini	Yamaha YZF-R6	22	+1:01.807	12	4
13	69	(Czech Republic) Ondřej Ježek	Honda CBR600RR	22	+1:06.106	16	3
14	38	(Hungary) Balázs Németh	Honda CBR600RR	22	+1:08.528	22	2
15	25	(Slovenia) Marko Jerman	Triumph Daytona 675	22	+1:32.599	26	1
16	10	(Hungary) Imre Tóth	Honda CBR600RR	21	+1 lap	25	
17	19	(Australia) Mitchell Pirotta	Honda CBR600RR	21	+1 lap	24	
Ret	77	(United Kingdom) James Ellison	Honda CBR600RR	21	Retirement	8	
Ret	28	(Poland) Paweł Szkopek	Honda CBR600RR	18	Accident	18	
Ret	14	(Republic of Ireland) Jack Kennedy	Yamaha YZF-R6	15	Retirement	20	
Ret	8	(Switzerland) Bastien Chesaux	Honda CBR600RR	14	Mechanical	23	
Ret	11	(United Kingdom) Sam Lowes	Honda CBR600RR	12	Retirement	3	
Ret	87	(Italy) Luca Marconi	Yamaha YZF-R6	9	Retirement	27	
Ret	34	(South Africa) Ronan Quarmby	Triumph Daytona 675	7	Retirement	17	
Ret	60	(Ukraine) Vladimir Ivanov	Honda CBR600RR	3	Retirement	11	
Ret	91	(Italy) Danilo Dell'Omo	Triumph Daytona 675	0	Mechanical	15	
DNS	95	(Romania) Robert Mureșan	Honda CBR600RR	0	Did not start	21	
DNS	99	(France) Fabien Foret	Honda CBR600RR		Did not start		
DNQ	24	(Russia) Eduard Blokhin	Yamaha YZF-R6		Did not qualify		
DNQ	73	(Russia) Oleg Pozdneev	Yamaha YZF-R6		Did not qualify		
OFFICIAL SUPERSPORT RACE REPORT
