= 2011 Nürburgring Superbike World Championship round =

(Germany) 2011 Nürburgring Superbike World Championship round
Round details
- Round 10 of 13 rounds in the 2011 Superbike World Championship. and Round 9 of 12 rounds in the 2011 Supersport World Championship.
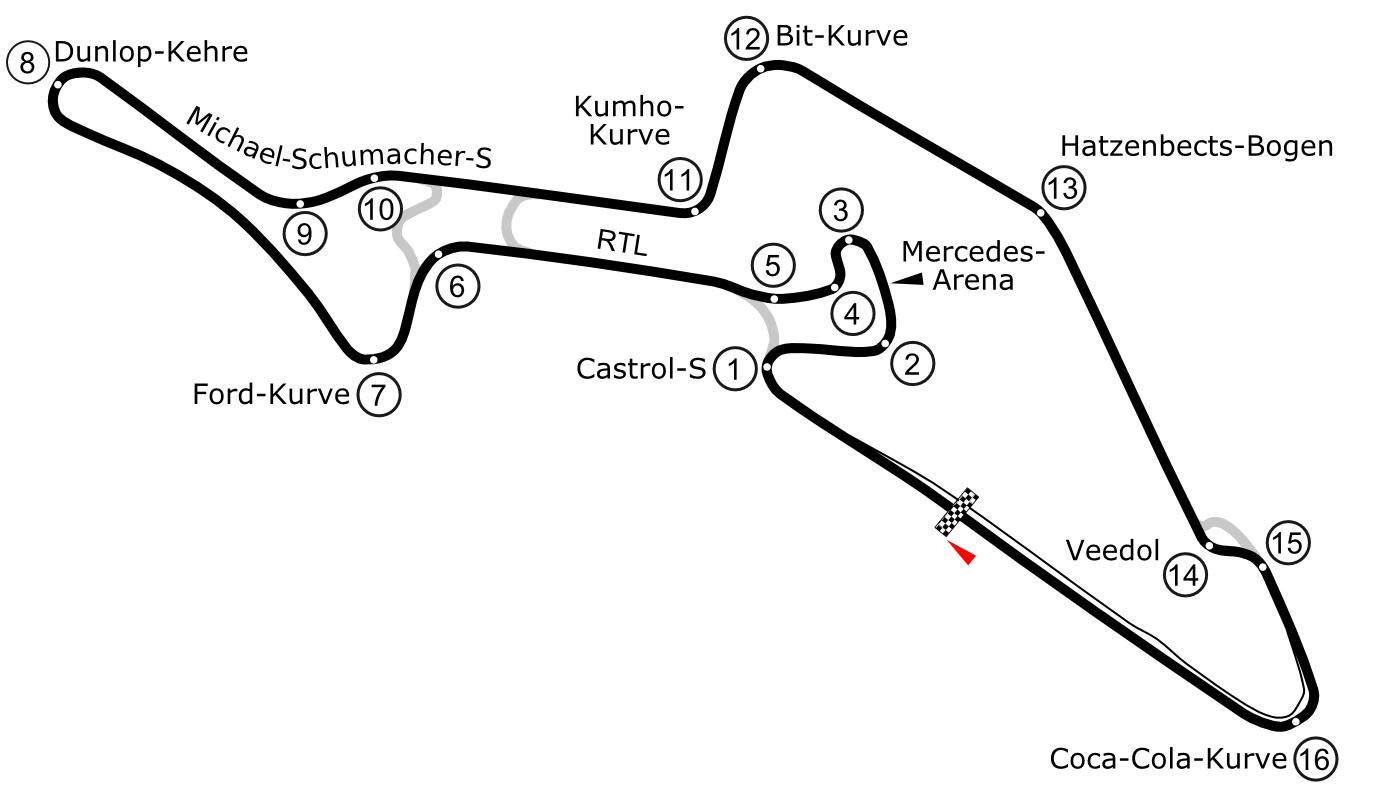
- Date: September 4, 2011
- Location: Nürburgring
- Course: Permanent racing facility 5.137 km (3.192 mi)

Superbike World Championship
Pole position
(Spain) Carlos Checa
1:54.144
Fastest lap race 1	Fastest lap race 2
(Spain) Carlos Checa	(Japan) Noriyuki Haga
1:55.971	2:14.619

Supersport World Championship
Pole position
(France) Fabien Foret
1:59.258
Fastest lap
(United Kingdom) James Ellison
1:59.795

The 2011 Nürburgring Superbike World Championship round was the tenth round of the 2011 Superbike World Championship. It took place on the weekend of September 2–4, 2011 at Nürburgring, Germany. The second race here turned out to be James Toseland's last race, as a crash aggravated the injury he picked up at Motorland Aragón earlier in the year and was forced to retire.

== Results ==
=== Superbike race 1 classification ===
Pos.	No.	Rider	Bike	Laps	Time/retired	Grid	Points
1	7	(Spain) Carlos Checa	Ducati 1098R	20	38:59.779	1	25
2	33	(Italy) Marco Melandri	Yamaha YZF-R1	20	+1.855	4	20
3	41	(Japan) Noriyuki Haga	Aprilia RSV4 Factory	20	+2.322	5	16
4	58	(Republic of Ireland) Eugene Laverty	Yamaha YZF-R1	20	+7.789	2	13
5	91	(United Kingdom) Leon Haslam	BMW S1000RR	20	+9.727	7	11
6	50	(France) Sylvain Guintoli	Ducati 1098R	20	+10.113	8	10
7	17	(Spain) Joan Lascorz	Kawasaki ZX-10R	20	+17.226	16	9
8	2	(United Kingdom) Leon Camier	Aprilia RSV4 Factory	20	+17.228	13	8
9	86	(Italy) Ayrton Badovini	BMW S1000RR	20	+18.166	15	7
10	4	(United Kingdom) Jonathan Rea	Honda CBR1000RR	20	+19.457	9	6
11	66	(United Kingdom) Tom Sykes	Kawasaki ZX-10R	20	+22.136	6	5
12	8	(Australia) Mark Aitchison	Kawasaki ZX-10R	20	+25.346	11	4
13	52	(United Kingdom) James Toseland	BMW S1000RR	20	+31.617	18	3
14	44	(Italy) Roberto Rolfo	Kawasaki ZX-10R	20	+31.796	19	2
15	11	(Australia) Troy Corser	BMW S1000RR	20	+33.320	17	1
16	84	(Italy) Michel Fabrizio	Suzuki GSX-R1000	20	+38.149	12	
17	100	(Japan) Makoto Tamada	Honda CBR1000RR	20	+1:16.143	20	
Ret	96	(Czech Republic) Jakub Smrž	Ducati 1098R	12	Retirement	10	
Ret	121	(France) Maxime Berger	Ducati 1098R	4	Technical problem	14	
DNS	1	(Italy) Max Biaggi	Aprilia RSV4 Factory	0	Injury	3	
Official Superbike Race 1 Report

=== Superbike race 2 classification ===
The race was red-flagged after 13 laps because of heavy rain.

Pos.	No.	Rider	Bike	Laps	Time/retired	Grid	Points
1	66	(United Kingdom) Tom Sykes	Kawasaki ZX-10R	13	29:49.337	5	25
2	50	(France) Sylvain Guintoli	Ducati 1098R	13	+4.063	7	20
3	96	(Czech Republic) Jakub Smrž	Ducati 1098R	13	+22.759	9	16
4	4	(United Kingdom) Jonathan Rea	Honda CBR1000RR	13	+28.497	8	13
5	58	(Republic of Ireland) Eugene Laverty	Yamaha YZF-R1	13	+38.374	2	11
6	33	(Italy) Marco Melandri	Yamaha YZF-R1	13	+45.326	3	10
7	86	(Italy) Ayrton Badovini	BMW S1000RR	13	+47.030	14	9
8	7	(Spain) Carlos Checa	Ducati 1098R	13	+50.032	1	8
9	91	(United Kingdom) Leon Haslam	BMW S1000RR	13	+53.586	6	7
10	121	(France) Maxime Berger	Ducati 1098R	13	+55.261	13	6
11	17	(Spain) Joan Lascorz	Kawasaki ZX-10R	13	+1:12.805	15	5
12	11	(Australia) Troy Corser	BMW S1000RR	13	+1:15.468	16	4
13	44	(Italy) Roberto Rolfo	Kawasaki ZX-10R	13	+1:40.323	18	3
Ret	41	(Japan) Noriyuki Haga	Aprilia RSV4 Factory	12	Accident	4	
Ret	100	(Japan) Makoto Tamada	Honda CBR1000RR	12	Accident	19	
Ret	2	(United Kingdom) Leon Camier	Aprilia RSV4 Factory	11	Accident	12	
Ret	8	(Australia) Mark Aitchison	Kawasaki ZX-10R	10	Accident	10	
Ret	52	(United Kingdom) James Toseland	BMW S1000RR	8	Accident	17	
Ret	84	(Italy) Michel Fabrizio	Suzuki GSX-R1000	5	Retirement	11	
DNS	1	(Italy) Max Biaggi	Aprilia RSV4 Factory		Injury		
Official Superbike Race 2 Report

=== Supersport race classification ===
Pos.	No.	Rider	Bike	Laps	Time/retired	Grid	Points
1	7	(United Kingdom) Chaz Davies	Yamaha YZF-R6	19	38:10.466	2	25
2	77	(United Kingdom) James Ellison	Honda CBR600RR	19	+0.091	5	20
3	11	(United Kingdom) Sam Lowes	Honda CBR600RR	19	+3.749	4	16
4	9	(Italy) Luca Scassa	Yamaha YZF-R6	19	+6.269	7	13
5	55	(Italy) Massimo Roccoli	Kawasaki ZX-6R	19	+8.702	6	11
6	99	(France) Fabien Foret	Honda CBR600RR	19	+14.034	1	10
7	23	(Australia) Broc Parkes	Kawasaki ZX-6R	19	+25.943	9	9
8	44	(Spain) David Salom	Kawasaki ZX-6R	19	+29.696	8	8
9	21	(France) Florian Marino	Honda CBR600RR	19	+30.886	10	7
10	38	(Hungary) Balázs Németh	Honda CBR600RR	19	+37.555	21	6
11	22	(Italy) Roberto Tamburini	Yamaha YZF-R6	19	+37.960	16	5
12	31	(Italy) Vittorio Iannuzzo	Kawasaki ZX-6R	19	+39.129	17	4
13	5	(Sweden) Alexander Lundh	Honda CBR600RR	19	+39.804	15	3
14	10	(Hungary) Imre Tóth	Honda CBR600RR	19	+44.892	19	2
15	34	(South Africa) Ronan Quarmby	Triumph Daytona 675	19	+48.634	14	1
16	91	(Italy) Danilo Dell'Omo	Triumph Daytona 675	19	+52.298	18	
17	69	(Czech Republic) Ondřej Ježek	Honda CBR600RR	19	+52.671	22	
18	43	(Germany) Marc Moser	Yamaha YZF-R6	19	+52.839	13	
19	17	(Czech Republic) Patrik Vostárek	Honda CBR600RR	19	+53.486	20	
20	25	(Slovenia) Marko Jerman	Triumph Daytona 675	19	+1:16.809	25	
21	60	(Ukraine) Vladimir Ivanov	Honda CBR600RR	19	+1:17.676	24	
22	57	(Netherlands) Kervin Bos	Yamaha YZF-R6	19	+1:45.523	27	
23	45	(Romania) Cătălin Cazacu	Honda CBR600RR	18	+1 lap	28	
24	73	(Russia) Oleg Pozdneev	Yamaha YZF-R6	18	+1 lap	31	
25	19	(Australia) Mitchell Pirotta	Honda CBR600RR	18	+1 lap	30	
26	24	(Russia) Eduard Blokhin	Yamaha YZF-R6	18	+1 lap	32	
Ret	117	(Portugal) Miguel Praia	Honda CBR600RR	17	Retirement	11	
Ret	127	(Denmark) Robbin Harms	Honda CBR600RR	15	Retirement	12	
Ret	28	(Poland) Paweł Szkopek	Honda CBR600RR	14	Accident	23	
Ret	4	(United Kingdom) Gino Rea	Honda CBR600RR	13	Accident	3	
Ret	33	(Austria) Yves Polzer	Yamaha YZF-R6	8	Retirement	29	
Ret	8	(Switzerland) Bastien Chesaux	Honda CBR600RR	5	Accident	26	
DNS	87	(Italy) Luca Marconi	Yamaha YZF-R6		Did not start		
Official Supersport Race Report

=== Superstock 1000 race classification ===
Pos.	No.	Rider	Bike	Laps	Time/retired	Grid	Points
1	34	(Italy) Davide Giugliano	Ducati 1098R	11	22:00.274	1	25
2	20	(France) Sylvain Barrier	BMW S1000RR	11	+4.274	2	20
3	59	(Italy) Niccolò Canepa	Ducati 1098R	11	+11.241	8	16
4	87	(Italy) Lorenzo Zanetti	BMW S1000RR	11	+11.459	4	13
5	14	(Italy) Lorenzo Baroni	Ducati 1098R	11	+11.711	6	11
6	21	(Germany) Markus Reiterberger	BMW S1000RR	11	+13.169	5	10
7	8	(Italy) Andrea Antonelli	Honda CBR1000RR	11	+15.742	7	9
8	32	(South Africa) Sheridan Morais	Kawasaki ZX-10R	11	+17.441	10	8
9	5	(Italy) Marco Bussolotti	Kawasaki ZX-10R	11	+18.440	13	7
10	67	(Australia) Bryan Staring	Kawasaki ZX-10R	11	+21.016	12	6
11	15	(Italy) Fabio Massei	BMW S1000RR	11	+22.967	11	5
12	47	(Italy) Eddi La Marra	Honda CBR1000RR	11	+23.242	16	4
13	6	(Italy) Lorenzo Savadori	Kawasaki ZX-10R	11	+24.239	18	3
14	28	(Italy) Ferruccio Lamborghini	Honda CBR1000RR	11	+25.979	9	2
15	11	(France) Jérémy Guarnoni	Yamaha YZF-R1	11	+26.329	20	1
16	33	(Switzerland) Michaël Savary	BMW S1000RR	11	+32.230	22	
17	36	(Argentina) Leandro Mercado	Kawasaki ZX-10R	11	+32.311	15	
18	39	(France) Randy Pagaud	BMW S1000RR	11	+40.130	17	
19	86	(Australia) Beau Beaton	BMW S1000RR	11	+43.603	19	
20	55	(Slovakia) Tomáš Svitok	Ducati 1098R	11	+50.646	24	
21	74	(United Kingdom) Kieran Clarke	Honda CBR1000RR	11	+53.410	28	
22	40	(Hungary) Alen Győrfi	Honda CBR1000RR	11	+53.771	27	
23	107	(Italy) Niccolò Rosso	Kawasaki ZX-10R	11	+54.343	26	
24	30	(Romania) Bogdan Vrăjitoru	Yamaha YZF-R1	11	+1:34.376	29	
Ret	31	(Sweden) Christoffer Bergman	Kawasaki ZX-10R	10	Accident	14	
Ret	9	(Italy) Danilo Petrucci	Ducati 1098R	8	Mechanical	3	
Ret	71	(Netherlands) Roy Ten Napel	Honda CBR1000RR	4	Accident	21	
Ret	93	(France) Mathieu Lussiana	BMW S1000RR	3	Retirement	23	
Ret	303	(United Kingdom) Keith Farmer	Kawasaki ZX-10R	0	Accident	25	
OFFICIAL SUPERSTOCK 1000 RACE REPORT

=== Superstock 600 race classification ===
Pos.	No.	Rider	Bike	Laps	Time/Retired	Grid	Points
1	60	(Netherlands) Michael Van Der Mark	Honda CBR600RR	10	20:40.709	3	25
2	3	(Australia) Jed Metcher	Yamaha YZF-R6	10	+3.136	2	20
3	52	(Belgium) Gauthier Duwelz	Yamaha YZF-R6	10	+3.569	10	16
4	59	(Denmark) Alex Schacht	Honda CBR600RR	10	+5.581	5	13
5	29	(Italy) Daniele Beretta	Yamaha YZF-R6	10	+8.515	12	11
6	99	(Netherlands) Tony Coveña	Yamaha YZF-R6	10	+9.092	16	10
7	84	(Italy) Riccardo Russo	Yamaha YZF-R6	10	+12.358	8	9
8	8	(United Kingdom) Joshua Elliott	Yamaha YZF-R6	10	+16.065	14	8
9	92	(Australia) Adrian Nestorovic	Yamaha YZF-R6	10	+17.900	13	7
10	43	(France) Stéphane Egea	Yamaha YZF-R6	10	+18.509	11	6
11	26	(Romania) Mircea Vrajitoru	Yamaha YZF-R6	10	+18.737	15	5
12	75	(Italy) Francesco Cocco	Yamaha YZF-R6	10	+18.944	7	4
13	13	(Italy) Dino Lombardi	Yamaha YZF-R6	10	+19.005	9	3
14	18	(Italy) Christian Gamarino	Kawasaki ZX-6R	10	+31.814	6	2
15	4	(United States) Joshua Day	Kawasaki ZX-6R	10	+31.871	1	1
16	19	(Slovakia) Tomáš Krajči	Yamaha YZF-R6	10	+31.986	19	
17	23	(Luxembourg) Christophe Ponsson	Yamaha YZF-R6	10	+36.206	21	
18	47	(Germany) Marc Buchner	Yamaha YZF-R6	10	+38.994	22	
Ret	64	(Italy) Riccardo Cecchini	Triumph Daytona 675	9	Retirement	18	
Ret	10	(Spain) Nacho Calero	Yamaha YZF-R6	9	Accident	20	
Ret	78	(Netherlands) Tristan Lentink	Honda CBR600RR	5	Retirement	24	
Ret	33	(Italy) Giuliano Gregorini	Yamaha YZF-R6	4	Retirement	17	
Ret	98	(France) Romain Lanusse	Yamaha YZF-R6	2	Accident	4	
Ret	9	(Croatia) Tedy Bašić	Yamaha YZF-R6	1	Retirement	23	
OFFICIAL SUPERSTOCK 600 RACE REPORT
