= Vittorio Iannuzzo =

Italian motorcycle racer

- Nationality: Italian
- Born: 10 May 1982 (age 44); Avellino, Italy
- Current team: HPC-Power Suzuki Racing Team
- Bike number: 31
Motorcycle racing career statistics
Superbike World Championship
Active years	2003, 2006–2010, 2013
Manufacturers	Suzuki, Ducati, Kawasaki, Honda, BMW
Starts / Wins / Podiums / Poles / F. laps / Points; 120 / 0 / 0 / 0 / 0 / 91
Supersport World Championship
Active years	1998–2001, 2004, 2010–2012
Manufacturers	Yamaha, Suzuki, Triumph, Kawasaki
Starts / Wins / Podiums / Poles / F. laps / Points; 73 / 0 / 0 / 0 / 0 / 189

Vittorio Iannuzzo (born 10 May 1982 in Avellino) is an Italian motorcycle racer. He currently competes in the IDM Superbike Championship aboard a Suzuki GSX-R1000.

Iannuzzo was the 2002 European Superstock 1000 champion riding an Alstare Suzuki.

In his Superbike World Championship participations, Iannuzzo had a front-row start at Misano World Circuit in 2003. In 2010, he had a huge crash at Circuit Ricardo Tormo when he tangled with Simon Andrews. In the same year, he rode a factory Triumph Daytona 675 in the Supersport World Championship, having replaced Jason DiSalvo midseason.

== Career statistics ==
2002 - 1st, Superstock European Championship, Suzuki GSX-R1000
2004 - 23rd, Superstock European Championship, Suzuki GSX-R1000
2005 - 14th, FIM Superstock 1000 Cup, MV Agusta

=== Supersport World Championship ===
==== Races by year ====
Year	Bike	1	2	3	4	5	6	7	8	9	10	11	12	13	Pos.	Pts
1998	Yamaha	GBR	ITA	SPA	GER	SMR; 14	RSA	USA	EUR	AUT	NED				50th	2
1999	Yamaha	RSA; 18	GBR; 15	SPA; 9	ITA; 13	GER; Ret	SMR; 8	USA; Ret	EUR; Ret	AUT; 16	NED; 19	GER; 14			18th	21
2000	Yamaha	AUS; Ret	JPN; Ret	GBR; 12	ITA; Ret	GER; 14	SMR; Ret	SPA; Ret	EUR; 19	NED; Ret	GER; 15	GBR; Ret			31st	7
2001	Suzuki	SPA; 19	AUS; 15	JPN; 12	ITA; 16	GBR; 18	GER; Ret	SMR; Ret	EUR; 14	GER; Ret	NED; 7	ITA; 12			18th	20
2004	Suzuki	SPA; 6	AUS; 13	SMR; 9	ITA; DSQ	GER; Ret	GBR; Ret	GBR; Ret	NED; Ret	ITA	FRA				16th	20
2010	Triumph	AUS	POR	SPA	NED	ITA	RSA	USA	SMR; 12	CZE; 11	GBR; 14	GER; Ret	ITA; 12	FRA; Ret	18th	15
2011	Kawasaki	AUS; 8	EUR; 9	NED; Ret	ITA; Ret	SMR; Ret	SPA; Ret	CZE; 10	GBR; 15	GER; 12	ITA; 7	FRA; 12	POR; 11		14th	44
2012	Triumph	AUS; 9	ITA; 5	NED; Ret	ITA; 9	EUR; Ret	SMR; 9	SPA; 7	CZE; 9	GBR; 13	RUS; Ret	GER; 7	POR; Ret	FRA; 19	9th	60

=== Superstock European Championship ===
==== Races by year ====
(key) (Races in bold indicate pole position) (Races in italics indicate fastest lap)

Year	Bike	1	2	3	4	5	6	7	8	9	Pos	Pts
2002	Suzuki	VAL; 1	MNZ; 1	SIL; 5	LAU; 1	SMR; 2	BRA; DNS	OSC; 5	NED; 6	IMO; 1	1st	152
2004	Suzuki	VAL	SMR	MNZ	OSC	SIL	BRA	NED	IMO; Ret	MAG; 5	23rd	11

=== CIV Championship (Campionato Italiano Velocita) ===
==== Races by year ====
(key) (Races in bold indicate pole position; races in italics indicate fastest lap)

Year	Class	Bike	1	2	3	4	5	Pos	Pts
2003	SuperBike	Suzuki	MIS1; 4	MUG1; Ret	**MIS1**; 1	MUG2; 2	VAL	5th	58

=== FIM Superstock 1000 Cup ===
==== Races by year ====
(key) (Races in bold indicate pole position) (Races in italics indicate fastest lap)

Year	Bike	1	2	3	4	5	6	7	8	9	10	Pos	Pts
2005	MV Agusta	VAL; Ret	MNZ; 11	SIL; 9	SMR; 3	BRN; 14	BRA; Ret	NED; 16	LAU; Ret	IMO; DNS	MAG; DNS	14th	30

=== Superbike World Championship ===
==== Races by year ====
Year	Make	1		2		3		4		5		6		7		8		9		10		11		12		13		14		Pos.	Pts
Year	Make	R1	R2	R1	R2	R1	R2	R1	R2	R1	R2	R1	R2	R1	R2	R1	R2	R1	R2	R1	R2	R1	R2	R1	R2	R1	R2	R1	R2	Pos.	Pts
2003	Suzuki	SPA	SPA	AUS	AUS	JPN	JPN	ITA; 12	ITA; 9	GER; 8	GER; 8	GBR; Ret	GBR; 15	SMR; Ret	SMR; 7	USA	USA	GBR	GBR	NED; DNS	NED; DNS	ITA	ITA	FRA	FRA					18th	37
2006	Suzuki	QAT; 17	QAT; Ret	AUS; Ret	AUS; Ret	SPA; 16	SPA; 26	ITA; Ret	ITA; 17	EUR; 18	EUR; Ret	SMR; 14	SMR; 16	CZE; 14	CZE; 18	GBR; 16	GBR; 15	NED; 15	NED; Ret	GER; Ret	GER; 16	ITA; Ret	ITA; Ret							26th	6
2006	Ducati																							FRA; 16	FRA; Ret					26th	6
2007	Kawasaki	QAT	QAT	AUS	AUS	EUR	EUR	SPA	SPA	NED	NED	ITA	ITA	GBR; 11	GBR; C	SMR	SMR	CZE; 13	CZE; 15	GBR	GBR	GER	GER	ITA; 10	ITA; 12	FRA	FRA			19th	19
2008	Kawasaki	QAT; 19	QAT; Ret	AUS; DNS	AUS; DNS	SPA	SPA	NED; DNS	NED; DNS	ITA; Ret	ITA; Ret	USA; 22	USA; 19	GER; 20	GER; Ret	SMR; Ret	SMR; Ret	CZE; Ret	CZE; Ret	GBR; 20	GBR; Ret	EUR; Ret	EUR; Ret	ITA; Ret	ITA; Ret	FRA; Ret	FRA; 23	POR; Ret	POR; Ret	NC	0
2009	Honda	AUS; Ret	AUS; Ret	QAT; 20	QAT; 21	SPA; Ret	SPA; 23	NED; Ret	NED; Ret	ITA; 21	ITA; DSQ	RSA	RSA	USA	USA	SMR; 20	SMR; 24	GBR; Ret	GBR; Ret	CZE; 15	CZE; 18	GER; Ret	GER; 15	ITA; Ret	ITA; Ret	FRA; Ret	FRA; Ret	POR; Ret	POR; Ret	40th	2
2010	Honda	AUS; 16	AUS; 17	POR; 16	POR; Ret	SPA; Ret	SPA; Ret	NED	NED	ITA; Ret	ITA; Ret	RSA	RSA	USA	USA	SMR	SMR	CZE	CZE	GBR	GBR	GER	GER	ITA	ITA	FRA	FRA			NC	0
2013	BMW	AUS; 17	AUS; 16	SPA; 14	SPA; Ret	NED; 17	NED; Ret	ITA; Ret	ITA; 12	GBR; 15	GBR; 16	POR; 11	POR; 15	ITA; 14	ITA; Ret	RUS; Ret	RUS; C	GBR; 17	GBR; 16	GER; 14	GER; 15	TUR; 12	TUR; 13	USA; 15	USA; 16	FRA; 15	FRA; Ret	SPA; NC	SPA; Ret	19th	27

=== British Superbike Championship ===
==== By year ====
(key) (Races in bold indicate pole position; races in italics indicate fastest lap)

Year	Make	1		2		3			4		5		6			7		8			9			10		11		12			Pos	Pts
Year	Make	R1	R2	R1	R2	R1	R2	R3	R1	R2	R1	R2	R1	R2	R3	R1	R2	R1	R2	R3	R1	R2	R3	R1	R2	R1	R2	R1	R2	R3	Pos	Pts
2015	MV Agusta	DON	DON	BHI	BHI	OUL	OUL		SNE; Ret	SNE; Ret	KNO; Ret	KNO; DNS	BHGP	BHGP		THR	THR	CAD	CAD		OUL	OUL	OUL	ASS	ASS	SIL	SIL	BHGP	BHGP	BHGP	NC	0
2016	Kawasaki	SIL; 21	SIL; 20	OUL; Ret	OUL; 18	BHI; Ret	BHI; 20		KNO; Ret	KNO; Ret	SNE; 21	SNE; Ret	THR; 23	THR; 23		BHGP; 23	BHGP; 21	CAD; 26	CAD; Ret		OUL; Ret	OUL; 22	OUL; 21	DON; 15	DON; 15	ASS; 20	ASS; 20	BHGP; 15	BHGP; Ret	BHGP; 21	28th	3

=== British Supersport Championship ===
(key) (Races in bold indicate pole position; races in italics indicate fastest lap)

Year	Bike	1	2	3	4	5	6	7	8	9	10	11	12	13	14	15	16	17	18	19	20	21	22	23	24	Pos	Pts
2015	MV Agusta	DON; 23	DON; Ret	BRH; 21	BRH; 19	OUL; DNS	OUL; DNS	SNE	SNE	KNO	KNO	BRH	BRH	THR	THR	CAD	CAD	OUL	OUL	ASS	ASS	SIL	SIL	BRH	BRH	NC	0
