= Simon Andrews (motorcyclist) =

British motorcycle racer

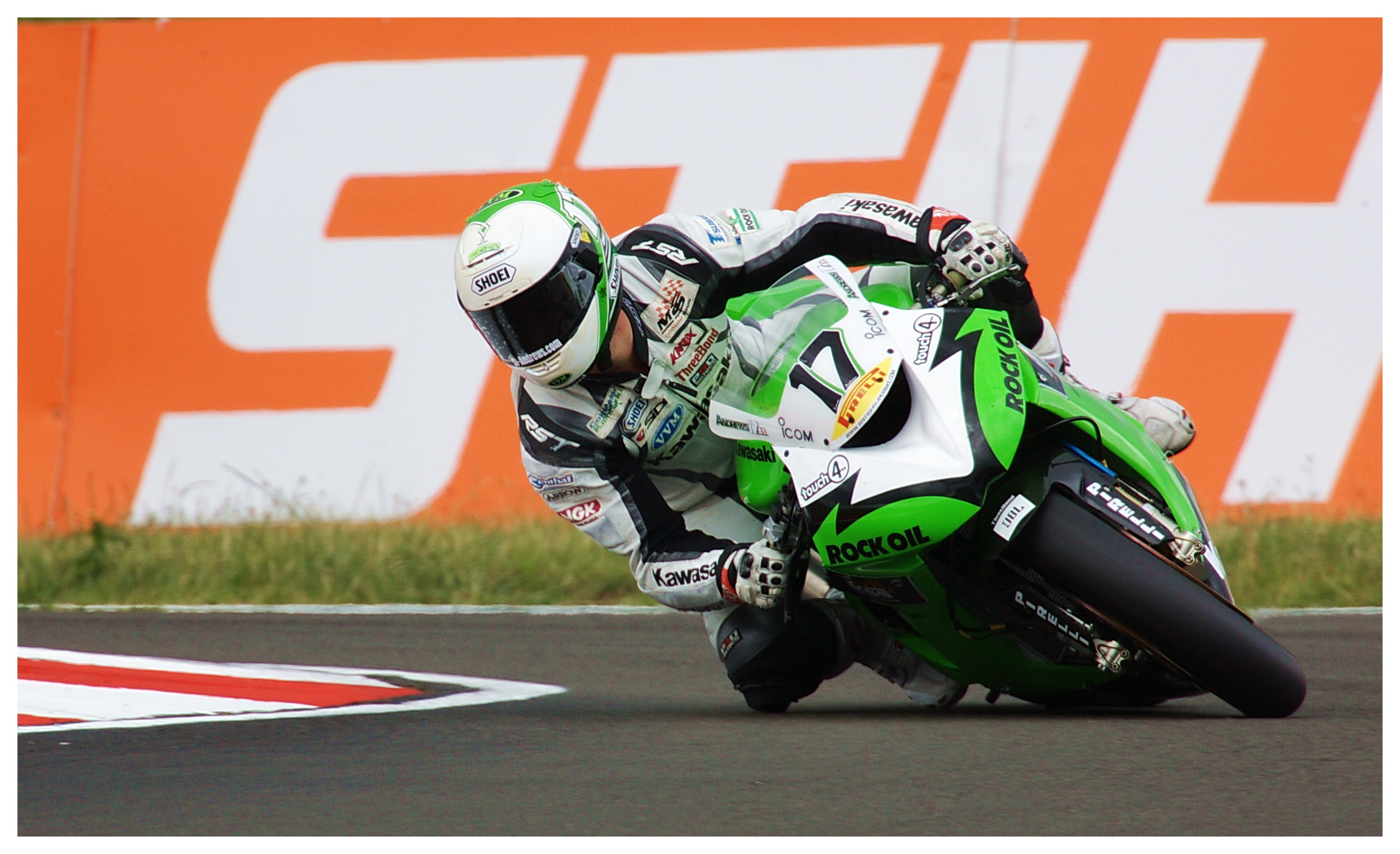
- Simon Andrews riding a Kawasaki at the BSB Snetterton 2009
- Nationality: English
- Born: 14 August 1982; Worcester, England
- Died: 19 May 2014 (aged 31); Belfast, Northern Ireland
Motorcycle racing career statistics
Isle of Man TT career
TTs contested	3 (2011, 2012, 2013)
TT wins	0
TT podiums	0

Simon Neil Stuart Andrews (14 August 1982 – 19 May 2014) was a British motorcycle racer. He competed in the British Superbike Championship for the MSS Kawasaki aboard a Kawasaki ZX10-R and RAF Reserves team, aboard a Honda CBR1000RR. He died as a result of a crash when racing on a road course in Northern Ireland.

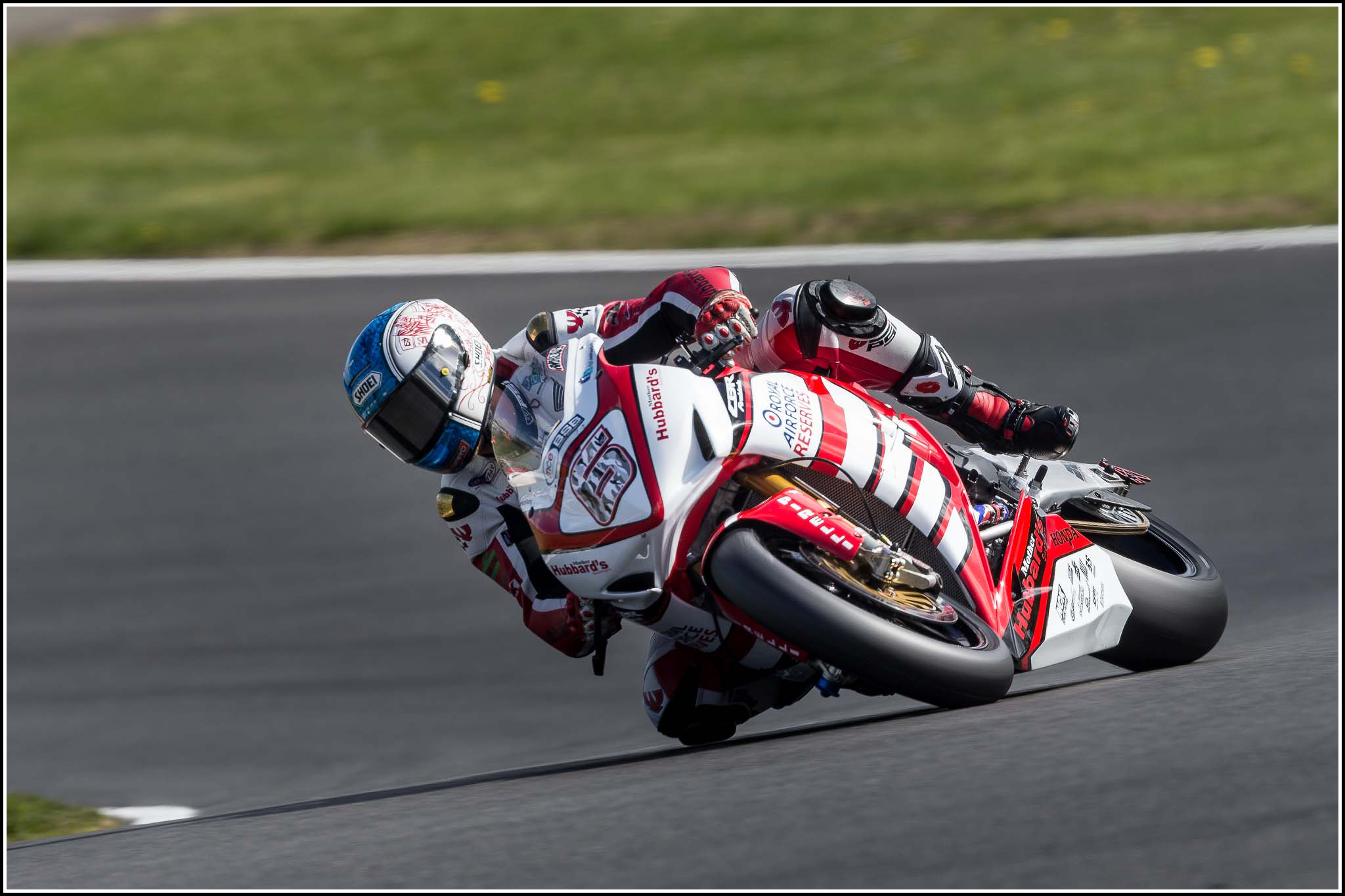
Here at his last Brands Hatch Superbike Race practice in April 2014

== Career ==
=== British Supersport Championship ===
Andrews made his British Supersport debut in 2001, and contested the series full-time in 2002. In 2003, he competed in three different championships – British Supersport, British Superstock and AXO European Superstock, earning five BSS podium finishes. In 2004, he came third in BSS, and took tenth overall in 2005. He started 2006 in Supersport again before moving up to the British Superbike Championship midseason with the Jentin Lloyds British team.

=== British Superbike Championship ===
In 2007, Andrews finished 16th overall from the nine rounds he contested.

In 2008, Andrews ran third for a while at Brands Hatch before finishing ninth. He scored two top-ten finishes at Donington Park in 2008, despite qualifying down in 24th. In race 2 at Mallory Park, he ran second for several laps on a drying track, but ultimately faded to seventh. He scored 20 top-ten finishes in total, despite being troubled by a knee injury for much of the season.Ä

For 2009, Andrews left Jentin to join MSS Colchester Kawasaki. Despite injuring his collarbone pre-season he qualified on the front row for round 3 at Donington Park, and took a fourth-place finish at round 4 at Thruxton. Andrews again impressed at Mallory Park, leading race one before being catapulted out by Josh Brookes in an incident which eliminated seven riders. He was already riding injured at this point, and an operation on his wrist immediately after this round caused him to miss the three-race meeting at Brands Hatch He took his first career podium at Cadwell Park, finishing fourth on the road but being promoted when on-the-road winner Leon Camier was excluded for ignoring a black and orange flag. In race one at the same venue, he touched with team-mate Julien da Costa in race one, finishing fifth ahead of the Frenchman. He was successful at Croft despite using no rider aids. He also contested the World Superbike round at Donington, finishing tenth in race 2 after passing the leading works Kawasaki of Broc Parkes. He finished the year by finishing seventh on his debut in the Macau street race. Andrews re-signed for the MSS Colchester Kawasaki team for 2009 alongside Gary Mason.

== Crash and death ==
Andrews was airlifted to a hospital in Northern Ireland in critical condition after suffering a serious crash while competing in the North West 200 on Saturday, 17 May 2014. He came off his bike at high speed, slid down the asphalt then collided head-first with the kerb-edge of a raised footway in Portrush, County Antrim.

After receiving immediate medical intervention from the race doctors and medics, Andrews was airlifted to the Royal Victoria Hospital in Belfast in a critical condition after suffering the high-speed accident on the approach to Metropole corner. Andrews was competing in the second Superstock race of the event aboard his BMW.

A statement was released on Sunday night (18 May) by race organisers they said: "Simon Andrews' family are at his bedside in the Intensive Care unit of the Royal Victoria Hospital, Belfast, where he remains in a critical condition following his crash in the Superstock race at yesterday's Vauxhall International North West 200."

Andrews died in hospital on 19 May 2014 as a result of his injuries, aged 31.

== Career statistics ==
=== All time ===
Series	Years active	Races	Poles	Podiums	**Wins**	**2nd place**	**3rd place**	Fastest laps	Titles
British Supersport **(BSS)**	^{2004–06}	25	0	3	1	1	1	0	0
British Superbike **(BSB)**	^{2008–14}	51	0	1	0	0	1	0	0
World Superbike **(WSB)**	^{2009–14}	4	0	0	0	0	0	0	0
Total		76	0	4	1	1	2	0	0

=== Superstock European Championship ===
==== Races by year ====
(key) (Races in bold indicate pole position) (Races in italics indicate fastest lap)

Year	Bike	1	2	3	4	5	6	7	8	9	Pos	Pts
2002	Honda	VAL; 18	MNZ; 9	SIL; 11	LAU; 17	SMR; DNS	BRA; 14	OSC; Ret	NED; 14	IMO	24th	16

=== British Supersport Championship ===
(key) (races in bold indicate pole position, races in italics indicate fastest lap)

Year	Bike	1	2	3	4	5	6	7	8	9	10	11	12	13	Pos	Pts	Ref
2004	Suzuki	SIL	BHI; 3	SNE; 5	OUL; 4	MON; 1	SNE	BHGP; 5	KNO	MAL	CRO	CAD; 9	OUL	DON; 10	9th	89	
2005	Suzuki	BHI; Ret	THR; 10	MAL; 12	OUL	MON	CRO	KNO; 9	SNE; Ret	SIL; 8	CAD; 2	OUL; 9	DON; 8	BHGP; 9	10th	67	
2006	Yamaha	BHI; Ret	DON	THR; 5	OUL; Ret	MON; C	MAL; 5	SNE; 7	KNO	OUL; Ret	CRO; Ret	CAD; 14	SIL	BHGP	18th	33	

=== British Superbike Championship ===
(key) (races in bold indicate pole position, races in italics indicate fastest lap)

Year	Class	Bike	1		2		3		4		5		6		7		8		9		10		11		12		13		Pos	Pts
Year	Class	Bike	R1	R2	R1	R2	R1	R2	R1	R2	R1	R2	R1	R2	R1	R2	R1	R2	R1	R2	R1	R2	R1	R2	R1	R2	R1	R2	Pos	Pts
2006	BSB	Yamaha Motor Company	BHI	BHI	DON	DON	THR	THR	OUL	OUL	MON; C	MON; C	MAL	MAL	SNE; Ret	SNE; Ret	KNO	KNO	OUL; 13	OUL; 15	CRO; 11	CRO; Ret	CAD	CAD	SIL; Ret	SIL; Ret	BHGP; 8	BHGP; 17	23rd	17

Year	Class	Bike	1		2		3		4		5		6		7			8			9		10		11		12			Pos	Pts	Ref
Year	Class	Bike	R1	R2	R1	R2	R1	R2	R1	R2	R1	R2	R1	R2	R1	R2	R3	R1	R2	R3	R1	R2	R1	R2	R1	R2	R1	R2	R3	Pos	Pts	Ref
2008	BSB	Yamaha	THR; 8	THR; Ret	OUL; Ret	OUL; 7	BHGP; 9	BHGP; Ret	DON; 10	DON; 9	SNE; 10	SNE; 8	MAL; 7	MAL; 7	OUL; 5	OUL; 6		KNO; 8	KNO; 6		CAD; 7	CAD; 6	CRO; 10	CRO; 9	SIL; 5	SIL; 8	BHI; 8	BHI; 7		8th	176	
2009	BSB	Kawasaki	BHI; 7	BHI; 11	OUL; Ret	OUL; 8	DON; Ret	DON; 4	THR; 4	THR; 6	SNE; 10	SNE; 11	KNO; 4	KNO; 6	MAL; Ret	MAL; 15		BHGP	BHGP	BHGP	CAD; 5	CAD; 3	CRO; Ret	CRO; 5	SIL; 9	SIL; 7	OUL; 6	OUL; 9	OUL; Ret	6th	163.5	
2010	BSB	Kawasaki	BHI; Ret	BHI; 8	THR	THR	OUL	OUL	CAD	CAD	MAL; 7	MAL; 7	KNO; 7	KNO; C	SNE; 8	SNE; 9	SNE; 6	BHGP; Ret	BHGP; 12	BHGP; 10	CAD; Ret	CAD; DNS	CRO	CRO	SIL	SIL	OUL	OUL	OUL	12th	70	
2011	BSB	Kawasaki	BHI; 15	BHI; 17	OUL; Ret	OUL; 19	CRO; 21	CRO; 18	THR; 27	THR; 20	KNO; 15	KNO; 10	SNE; 17	SNE; DNS	OUL	OUL		BHGP	BHGP	BHGP	CAD	CAD	DON	DON	SIL	SIL	BHGP	BHGP	BHGP	25th	8	
2011	E^{1}	Kawasaki	BHI; 15	BHI; 17	OUL; Ret	OUL; 19	CRO; 21	CRO; 18	THR; 27	THR; 20	KNO; 15	KNO; 10	SNE; 17	SNE; DNS	OUL	OUL		BHGP	BHGP	BHGP	CAD	CAD	DON	DON	SIL	SIL	BHGP	BHGP	BHGP	4th	158	

Year	Make	1			2			3			4			5			6			7			8			9			10			11			12			Pos	Pts
Year	Make	R1	R2	R3	R1	R2	R3	R1	R2	R3	R1	R2	R3	R1	R2	R3	R1	R2	R3	R1	R2	R3	R1	R2	R3	R1	R2	R3	R1	R2	R3	R1	R2	R3	R1	R2	R3	Pos	Pts
2014	Honda	BHI; Ret	BHI; DNS		OUL; Ret	OUL; DNS		SNE	SNE		KNO	KNO		BHGP	BHGP		THR	THR		OUL	OUL	OUL	CAD	CAD		DON	DON		ASS	ASS		SIL	SIL		BHGP	BHGP	BHGP	NC	0

1. – E Denotes riders participating in the Evo class within the British Superbike Championship.

=== Superbike World Championship ===
(key) (races in bold indicate pole position, races in italics indicate fastest lap)

Year	Bike	1		2		3		4		5		6		7		8		9		10		11		12		13		14		Pos	Pts	Ref
Year	Bike	R1	R2	R1	R2	R1	R2	R1	R2	R1	R2	R1	R2	R1	R2	R1	R2	R1	R2	R1	R2	R1	R2	R1	R2	R1	R2	R1	R2	Pos	Pts	Ref
2009	Kawasaki	AUS	AUS	QAT	QAT	SPA	SPA	NED	NED	ITA	ITA	RSA	RSA	USA	USA	SMR	SMR	GBR; 20	GBR; 10	CZE	CZE	GER	GER	ITA	ITA	FRA	FRA	POR	POR	29th	6	
2010	Kawasaki	AUS	AUS	POR	POR	SPA; 18	SPA; Ret	NED	NED	ITA	ITA	RSA	RSA	USA	USA	SMR	SMR	CZE	CZE	GBR	GBR	GER	GER	ITA	ITA	FRA	FRA			NC	0	
