= 2010 Valencia Superbike World Championship round =

Sports championship season

(Spain) 2010 Valencia Superbike World Championship round
Round details
- Round 3 of 13 rounds in the 2010 Superbike World Championship. and Round 3 of 13 rounds in the 2010 Supersport World Championship.
- Date: April 11, 2010
- Location: Valencia
- Course: Permanent racing facility 4.005 km (2.489 mi)

Superbike World Championship
Pole position
(United Kingdom) Cal Crutchlow
1:33.615
Fastest lap race 1	Fastest lap race 2
(Spain) Carlos Checa	(Italy) Max Biaggi
1:34.750	1:34.632

Supersport World Championship
Pole position
(Republic of Ireland) Eugene Laverty
1:35.658
Fastest lap
(Spain) Joan Lascorz
1:37.049

The 2010 Valencia Superbike World Championship round was the third round of the 2010 Superbike World Championship season. It took place on the weekend of April 9–11, 2010 at Circuit Ricardo Tormo in Valencia, Spain.

== Results ==
=== Superbike race 1 classification ===
Pos	No	Rider	Manufacturer	Laps	Time	Grid	Points
1	91	(United Kingdom) Leon Haslam	Suzuki GSX-R1000	23	36:47.723	4	25
2	3	(Italy) Max Biaggi	Aprilia RSV4 1000 F	23	+1.757	3	20
3	52	(United Kingdom) James Toseland	Yamaha YZF-R1	23	+3.621	9	16
4	11	(Australia) Troy Corser	BMW S1000RR	23	+4.209	5	13
5	41	(Japan) Noriyuki Haga	Ducati 1098R	23	+4.378	11	11
6	65	(United Kingdom) Jonathan Rea	Honda CBR1000RR	23	+9.834	7	10
7	35	(United Kingdom) Cal Crutchlow	Yamaha YZF-R1	23	+10.466	1	9
8	57	(Italy) Lorenzo Lanzi	Ducati 1098R	23	+16.080	8	8
9	50	(France) Sylvain Guintoli	Suzuki GSX-R1000	23	+18.382	6	7
10	96	(Czech Republic) Jakub Smrž	Ducati 1098R	23	+18.589	14	6
11	66	(United Kingdom) Tom Sykes	Kawasaki ZX-10R	23	+22.903	18	5
12	111	(Spain) Rubén Xaus	BMW S1000RR	23	+25.203	17	4
13	76	(Germany) Max Neukirchner	Honda CBR1000RR	23	+25.676	16	3
14	99	(Italy) Luca Scassa	Ducati 1098R	23	+26.606	15	2
15	88	(Australia) Andrew Pitt	BMW S1000RR	23	+43.797	19	1
16	95	(United States) Roger Lee Hayden	Kawasaki ZX-10R	23	+48.094	22	
17	15	(Italy) Matteo Baiocco	Kawasaki ZX-10R	23	+48.190	21	
18	17	(United Kingdom) Simon Andrews	Kawasaki ZX-10R	23	+52.863	23	
Ret	31	(Italy) Vittorio Iannuzzo	Honda CBR1000RR	12	Accident	24	
Ret	2	(United Kingdom) Leon Camier	Aprilia RSV4 1000 F	7	Accident	13	
Ret	84	(Italy) Michel Fabrizio	Ducati 1098R	5	Accident	10	
Ret	67	(United Kingdom) Shane Byrne	Ducati 1098R	5	Accident	12	
Ret	7	(Spain) Carlos Checa	Ducati 1098R	2	Mechanical	2	
Ret	123	(Austria) Roland Resch	BMW S1000RR	2	Mechanical	25	
DNS	32	(South Africa) Sheridan Morais	Honda CBR1000RR		Did not start	20	
OFFICIAL SUPERBIKE RACE 1 REPORT

=== Superbike race 2 classification ===
Race 2 was stopped after 3 laps, because of an accident involving Simon Andrews and Vittorio Iannuzzo. The race was restarted for the remaining 20 laps and the final result was the aggregate of the times of the two heats.

Pos	No	Rider	Manufacturer	Laps	Time	Grid	Points
1	41	(Japan) Noriyuki Haga	Ducati 1098R	23	36:51.500	11	25
2	7	(Spain) Carlos Checa	Ducati 1098R	23	+0.025	2	20
3	3	(Italy) Max Biaggi	Aprilia RSV4 1000 F	23	+0.299	3	16
4	91	(United Kingdom) Leon Haslam	Suzuki GSX-R1000	23	+10.100	4	13
5	65	(United Kingdom) Jonathan Rea	Honda CBR1000RR	23	+12.811	7	11
6	50	(France) Sylvain Guintoli	Suzuki GSX-R1000	23	+13.459	6	10
7	52	(United Kingdom) James Toseland	Yamaha YZF-R1	23	+14.845	9	9
8	67	(United Kingdom) Shane Byrne	Ducati 1098R	23	+14.861	12	8
9	35	(United Kingdom) Cal Crutchlow	Yamaha YZF-R1	23	+15.202	1	7
10	96	(Czech Republic) Jakub Smrž	Ducati 1098R	23	+18.071	14	6
11	111	(Spain) Rubén Xaus	BMW S1000RR	23	+25.179	17	5
12	11	(Australia) Troy Corser	BMW S1000RR	23	+26.116	5	4
13	57	(Italy) Lorenzo Lanzi	Ducati 1098R	23	+30.189	8	3
14	99	(Italy) Luca Scassa	Ducati 1098R	23	+30.387	15	2
15	66	(United Kingdom) Tom Sykes	Kawasaki ZX-10R	23	+35.741	18	1
16	88	(Australia) Andrew Pitt	BMW S1000RR	23	+43.244	19	
17	76	(Germany) Max Neukirchner	Honda CBR1000RR	23	+43.540	16	
18	123	(Austria) Roland Resch	BMW S1000RR	23	+47.145	25	
19	95	(United States) Roger Lee Hayden	Kawasaki ZX-10R	23	+48.502	22	
20	15	(Italy) Matteo Baiocco	Kawasaki ZX-10R	23	+51.838	21	
Ret	84	(Italy) Michel Fabrizio	Ducati 1098R	15	Retirement	10	
Ret	2	(United Kingdom) Leon Camier	Aprilia RSV4 1000 F	12	Accident	13	
Ret	17	(United Kingdom) Simon Andrews	Kawasaki ZX-10R	3	Accident	23	
Ret	31	(Italy) Vittorio Iannuzzo	Honda CBR1000RR	3	Did not start heat 2	24	
DNS	32	(South Africa) Sheridan Morais	Honda CBR1000RR		Did not start	20	
OFFICIAL SUPERBIKE RACE 2 REPORT

=== Supersport race classification ===
Pos	No	Rider	Manufacturer	Laps	Time	Grid	Points
1	26	(Spain) Joan Lascorz	Kawasaki ZX-6R	23	37:32.610	2	25
2	54	(Turkey) Kenan Sofuoğlu	Honda CBR600RR	23	+3.193	3	20
3	7	(United Kingdom) Chaz Davies	Triumph Daytona 675	23	+5.417	6	16
4	25	(Spain) David Salom	Triumph Daytona 675	23	+8.317	5	13
5	50	(Republic of Ireland) Eugene Laverty	Honda CBR600RR	23	+10.757	1	11
6	4	(United Kingdom) Gino Rea	Honda CBR600RR	23	+38.866	12	10
7	14	(France) Matthieu Lagrive	Triumph Daytona 675	23	+38.926	13	9
8	5	(Sweden) Alexander Lundh	Honda CBR600RR	23	+50.902	15	8
9	127	(Denmark) Robbin Harms	Honda CBR600RR	23	+56.653	10	7
10	99	(France) Fabien Foret	Kawasaki ZX-6R	23	+1:01.495	7	6
11	51	(Italy) Michele Pirro	Honda CBR600RR	23	+1:06.573	8	5
12	117	(Portugal) Miguel Praia	Honda CBR600RR	23	+1:18.142	14	4
Ret	33	(Italy) Paola Cazzola	Honda CBR600RR	10	Mechanical	19	
Ret	40	(United States) Jason DiSalvo	Triumph Daytona 675	5	Retirement	9	
Ret	37	(Japan) Katsuaki Fujiwara	Kawasaki ZX-6R	2	Accident	4	
Ret	8	(Switzerland) Bastien Chesaux	Honda CBR600RR	2	Accident	17	
Ret	55	(Italy) Massimo Roccoli	Honda CBR600RR	1	Accident	11	
Ret	9	(Italy) Danilo Dell'Omo	Honda CBR600RR	1	Retirement	18	
Ret	85	(Italy) Alessio Palumbo	Kawasaki ZX-6R	0	Accident	16	
DNQ	24	(Russia) Eduard Blokhin	Yamaha YZF R6				
OFFICIAL SUPERSPORT RACE REPORT

=== Superstock 1000 race classification ===
Pos	No	Rider	Manufacturer	Laps	Time	Grid	Points
1	86	(Italy) Ayrton Badovini	BMW S1000RR	13	21:17.508	1	25
2	34	(Italy) Davide Giugliano	Suzuki GSX-R1000 K9	13	+3.080	4	20
3	20	(France) Sylvain Barrier	BMW S1000RR	13	+4.693	6	16
4	119	(Italy) Michele Magnoni	Honda CBR1000RR	13	+5.971	8	13
5	65	(France) Loris Baz	Yamaha YZF-R1	13	+9.169	5	11
6	8	(Italy) Andrea Antonelli	Honda CBR1000RR	13	+9.313	2	10
7	11	(Spain) Pere Tutusaus	KTM 1190 RC8 R	13	+9.705	12	9
8	51	(Spain) Santiago Barragan	Honda CBR1000RR	13	+15.553	19	8
9	5	(Italy) Marco Bussolotti	Honda CBR1000RR	13	+16.151	10	7
10	14	(Italy) Lorenzo Baroni	Ducati 1098R	13	+16.410	13	6
11	69	(Czech Republic) Ondřej Ježek	Aprilia RSV4 1000	13	+17.578	16	5
12	7	(Austria) René Mähr	Suzuki GSX-R1000 K9	13	+18.066	14	4
13	9	(Italy) Danilo Petrucci	Kawasaki ZX-10R	13	+25.714	17	3
14	89	(Czech Republic) Michal Salač	Aprilia RSV4 1000	13	+28.565	26	2
15	99	(South Africa) Chris Leeson	Kawasaki ZX-10R	13	+32.834	23	1
16	21	(Brazil) Danilo Andric	Honda CBR1000RR	13	+33.880	21	
17	55	(Slovakia) Tomáš Svitok	Honda CBR1000RR	13	+34.118	25	
18	134	(Italy) Roberto Lacalendola	Ducati 1098R	13	+42.172	18	
19	91	(Poland) Marcin Walkowiak	Honda CBR1000RR	13	+46.698	24	
20	45	(Norway) Kim Arne Sletten	Yamaha YZF-R1	13	+47.645	30	
21	111	(Italy) Marco Rosini	KTM 1190 RC8 R	13	+52.853	31	
22	88	(Spain) Josep Pedro	Yamaha YZF-R1	13	+53.067	29	
Ret	36	(Brazil) Philippe Thiriet	Honda CBR1000RR	12	Accident	28	
Ret	21	(France) Maxime Berger	Honda CBR1000RR	6	Accident	3	
Ret	47	(Italy) Eddi La Marra	Honda CBR1000RR	6	Accident	11	
Ret	30	(Switzerland) Michaël Savary	BMW S1000RR	5	Accident	15	
Ret	66	(Poland) Mateusz Stoklosa	BMW S1000RR	5	Retirement	27	
Ret	12	(Italy) Nico Vivarelli	KTM 1190 RC8 R	4	Technical	20	
Ret	93	(France) Mathieu Lussiana	BMW S1000RR	1	Accident	7	
Ret	29	(Italy) Daniele Beretta	BMW S1000RR	0	Technical	22	
DNS	53	(Germany) Dominic Lammert	BMW S1000RR	0	Did not start	9	
OFFICIAL SUPERSTOCK 1000 RACE REPORT

=== Superstock 600 race classification ===
Pos	No	Rider	Manufacturer	Laps	Time	Grid	Points
1	21	(France) Florian Marino	Honda CBR600RR	11	18:31.319	2	25
2	72	(Norway) Fredrik Karlsen	Yamaha YZF-R6	11	+0.413	3	20
3	11	(France) Jérémy Guarnoni	Yamaha YZF-R6	11	+0.441	4	16
4	13	(Italy) Dino Lombardi	Yamaha YZF-R6	11	+4.668	6	13
5	343	(Italy) Federico D'Annunzio	Yamaha YZF-R6	11	+16.637	13	11
6	27	(Italy) Davide Fanelli	Honda CBR600RR	11	+16.883	15	10
7	9	(United Kingdom) Joshua Elliott	Honda CBR600RR	11	+17.410	11	9
8	19	(Slovakia) Tomáš Krajči	Yamaha YZF-R6	11	+23.806	17	8
9	28	(France) Steven Le Coquen	Yamaha YZF-R6	11	+26.262	16	7
10	26	(Romania) Mircea Vrajitoru	Yamaha YZF-R6	11	+35.197	19	6
11	17	(Portugal) André Carvalho	Yamaha YZF-R6	11	+39.683	14	5
12	69	(France) Nelson Major	Yamaha YZF-R6	11	+43.983	1	4
13	52	(Belgium) Gauthier Duwelz	Yamaha YZF-R6	11	+44.494	12	3
14	95	(Romania) Robert Mureșan	Honda CBR600RR	10	+1 lap	18	2
Ret	10	(Spain) Nacho Calero	Yamaha YZF-R6	5	Accident	5	
Ret	12	(Italy) Riccardo Cecchini	Triumph Daytona 675	4	Collision	7	
Ret	22	(France) Cyril Carrillo	Yamaha YZF-R6	4	Collision	10	
Ret	59	(Denmark) Alex Schacht	Honda CBR600RR	3	Accident	8	
Ret	6	(France) Romain Lanusse	Yamaha YZF-R6	0	Accident	9	
Ret	82	(Czech Republic) Karel Pešek	Yamaha YZF-R6	0	Accident	20	
OFFICIAL SUPERSTOCK 600 RACE REPORT
