= 2009 Donington Superbike World Championship round =

(United Kingdom) 2009 Donington Superbike World Championship round
Round details
- Round 9 of 14 rounds in the 2009 Superbike World Championship. and Round 9 of 14 rounds in the 2009 Supersport World Championship.
- Date: 26-28 June, 2009
- Location: Donington Park
- Course: Permanent racing facility 4.023 km (2.500 mi)

Superbike World Championship
Pole position
(United States) Ben Spies
1:29.846
Fastest lap race 1	Fastest lap race 2
(United States) Ben Spies	(United States) Ben Spies
1:30.575	1:30.631

Supersport World Championship
Pole position
(United Kingdom) Cal Crutchlow
1:31.701
Fastest lap
(United Kingdom) Cal Crutchlow
1:32.449

The 2009 Donington Superbike World Championship round was the ninth round of the 2009 Superbike World Championship season. It took place on the weekend of 26–28 June 2009 at Donington Park.

== Results ==
=== Superbike race 1 ===
Pos	No	Rider	Bike	Laps	Time	Grid	Points
1	19	(United States) Ben Spies	Yamaha YZF-R1	23	34:57.230	1	25
2	3	(Italy) Max Biaggi	Aprilia RSV 4	23	+7.156	2	20
3	41	(Japan) Noriyuki Haga	Ducati 1098R	23	+10.968	6	16
4	91	(United Kingdom) Leon Haslam	Honda CBR1000RR	23	+18.843	9	13
5	67	(United Kingdom) Shane Byrne	Ducati 1098R	23	+19.125	3	11
6	56	(Japan) Shinya Nakano	Aprilia RSV 4	23	+21.286	4	10
7	65	(United Kingdom) Jonathan Rea	Honda CBR1000RR	23	+23.644	12	9
8	121	(United States) John Hopkins	Honda CBR1000RR	23	+32.849	11	8
9	96	(Czech Republic) Jakub Smrž	Ducati 1098R	23	+32.904	8	7
10	9	(Japan) Ryuichi Kiyonari	Honda CBR1000RR	23	+33.192	20	6
11	7	(Spain) Carlos Checa	Honda CBR1000RR	23	+34.535	7	5
12	84	(Italy) Michel Fabrizio	Ducati 1098R	23	+35.093	5	4
13	22	(United Kingdom) Leon Camier	Yamaha YZF-R1	23	+35.441	17	3
14	57	(Italy) Lorenzo Lanzi	Ducati 1098R	23	+39.034	19	2
15	111	(Spain) Rubén Xaus	BMW S1000RR	23	+41.067	16	1
16	14	(France) Matthieu Lagrive	Honda CBR1000RR	23	+46.452	24	
17	71	(Japan) Yukio Kagayama	Suzuki GSX-R1000 K9	23	+47.924	18	
18	23	(Australia) Broc Parkes	Kawasaki ZX-10R	23	+48.246	22	
19	99	(Italy) Luca Scassa	Kawasaki ZX-10R	23	+50.932	21	
20	117	(United Kingdom) Simon Andrews	Kawasaki ZX-10R	23	+55.032	26	
21	2	(United States) Jamie Hacking	Kawasaki ZX-10R	23	+55.216	25	
22	53	(Italy) Alessandro Polita	Suzuki GSX-R1000 K9	23	+1:02.758	27	
23	25	(Spain) David Salom	Kawasaki ZX-10R	23	+1:02.977	23	
24	94	(Spain) David Checa	Yamaha YZF-R1	23	+1:12.255	29	
25	79	(United States) Blake Young	Suzuki GSX-R1000 K9	23	+1:12.531	28	
Ret	11	(Australia) Troy Corser	BMW S1000RR	21	Accident	15	
Ret	27	(United Kingdom) James Ellison	Yamaha YZF-R1	13	Accident	14	
Ret	88	(Austria) Roland Resch	Suzuki GSX-R1000 K9	13	Retirement	30	
Ret	66	(United Kingdom) Tom Sykes	Yamaha YZF-R1	13	Retirement	10	
Ret	36	(Spain) Gregorio Lavilla	Ducati 1098R	7	Retirement	13	
Ret	77	(Italy) Vittorio Iannuzzo	Honda CBR1000RR	0	Accident	31	

=== Superbike race 2 ===
Pos	No	Rider	Bike	Laps	Time	Grid	Points
1	19	(United States) Ben Spies	Yamaha YZF-R1	23	35:14.788	1	25
2	91	(United Kingdom) Leon Haslam	Honda CBR1000RR	23	+6.622	9	20
3	84	(Italy) Michel Fabrizio	Ducati 1098R	23	+6.816	5	16
4	67	(United Kingdom) Shane Byrne	Ducati 1098R	23	+7.349	3	13
5	66	(United Kingdom) Tom Sykes	Yamaha YZF-R1	23	+8.145	10	11
6	22	(United Kingdom) Leon Camier	Yamaha YZF-R1	23	+13.463	17	10
7	9	(Japan) Ryuichi Kiyonari	Honda CBR1000RR	23	+15.751	20	9
8	27	(United Kingdom) James Ellison	Yamaha YZF-R1	23	+16.837	14	8
9	111	(Spain) Rubén Xaus	BMW S1000RR	23	+22.891	16	7
10	117	(United Kingdom) Simon Andrews	Kawasaki ZX-10R	23	+30.347	26	6
11	57	(Italy) Lorenzo Lanzi	Ducati 1098R	23	+30.622	19	5
12	14	(France) Matthieu Lagrive	Honda CBR1000RR	23	+31.562	24	4
13	71	(Japan) Yukio Kagayama	Suzuki GSX-R1000 K9	23	+32.148	18	3
14	23	(Australia) Broc Parkes	Kawasaki ZX-10R	23	+32.607	22	2
15	65	(United Kingdom) Jonathan Rea	Honda CBR1000RR	23	+32.806	12	1
16	99	(Italy) Luca Scassa	Kawasaki ZX-10R	23	+34.269	21	
17	79	(United States) Blake Young	Suzuki GSX-R1000 K9	23	+40.644	28	
18	36	(Spain) Gregorio Lavilla	Ducati 1098R	23	+40.956	13	
19	25	(Spain) David Salom	Kawasaki ZX-10R	23	+41.302	23	
20	11	(Australia) Troy Corser	BMW S1000RR	23	+42.856	15	
21	3	(Italy) Max Biaggi	Aprilia RSV 4	23	+47.769	2	
Ret	77	(Italy) Vittorio Iannuzzo	Honda CBR1000RR	15	Retirement	31	
Ret	88	(Austria) Roland Resch	Suzuki GSX-R1000 K9	15	Retirement	30	
Ret	53	(Italy) Alessandro Polita	Suzuki GSX-R1000 K9	6	Retirement	27	
Ret	7	(Spain) Carlos Checa	Honda CBR1000RR	5	Accident	7	
Ret	94	(Spain) David Checa	Yamaha YZF-R1	5	Accident	29	
Ret	41	(Japan) Noriyuki Haga	Ducati 1098R	4	Accident	6	
Ret	96	(Czech Republic) Jakub Smrž	Ducati 1098R	2	Accident	8	
Ret	56	(Japan) Shinya Nakano	Aprilia RSV 4	1	Accident	4	
Ret	2	(United States) Jamie Hacking	Kawasaki ZX-10R	1	Accident	25	
DNS	121	(United States) John Hopkins	Honda CBR1000RR		Not started		

=== Supersport race ===
Pos	No	Rider	Manufacturer	Laps	Time	Grid	Points
1	35	(United Kingdom) Cal Crutchlow	Yamaha YZF-R6	22	34:15.876	1	25
2	26	(Spain) Joan Lascorz	Kawasaki ZX-6R	22	+5.391	3	20
3	24	(Australia) Garry McCoy	Triumph Daytona 675	22	+14.918	6	16
4	54	(Turkey) Kenan Sofuoğlu	Honda CBR600RR	22	+22.248	4	13
5	50	(Republic of Ireland) Eugene Laverty	Honda CBR600RR	22	+37.054	2	11
6	77	(Netherlands) Barry Veneman	Honda CBR600RR	22	+39.079	17	10
7	105	(Italy) Gianluca Vizziello	Honda CBR600RR	22	+39.978	22	9
8	69	(Italy) Gianluca Nannelli	Triumph Daytona 675	22	+42.733	12	8
9	9	(Italy) Danilo dell'Omo	Honda CBR600RR	22	+43.030	14	7
10	1	(Australia) Andrew Pitt	Honda CBR600RR	22	+47.422	15	6
11	4	(United Kingdom) James Westmoreland	Triumph Daytona 675	22	+50.207	20	5
12	7	(Czech Republic) Patrik Vostárek	Honda CBR600RR	22	+50.474	27	4
13	101	(United Kingdom) Kev Coghlan	Yamaha YZF-R6	22	+50.763	23	3
14	6	(South Africa) Hudson Kennaugh	Yamaha YZF-R6	22	+58.147	16	2
15	51	(Italy) Michele Pirro	Yamaha YZF-R6	22	+59.756	11	1
16	28	(Netherlands) Arie Vos	Honda CBR600RR	22	+1:16.315	19	
17	40	(Italy) Flavio Gentile	Honda CBR600RR	22	+1:26.650	28	
18	96	(Czech Republic) Matej Smrž	Triumph Daytona 675	22	+1:27.976	24	
19	88	(Spain) Yannick Guerra	Yamaha YZF-R6	21	+1 Lap	29	
20	25	(United Kingdom) Michael Laverty	Honda CBR600RR	20	+2 Laps	18	
Ret	99	(France) Fabien Foret	Yamaha YZF-R6	18	Mechanical	10	
Ret	117	(Portugal) Miguel Praia	Honda CBR600RR	9	Retirement	13	
Ret	127	(Denmark) Robbin Harms	Honda CBR600RR	6	Mechanical	21	
Ret	22	(Romania) Robert Mureşan	Triumph Daytona 675	6	Accident	26	
Ret	13	(Australia) Anthony West	Honda CBR600RR	5	Accident	9	
Ret	30	(Germany) Jesco Günther	Honda CBR600RR	5	Retirement	25	
Ret	8	(Australia) Mark Aitchison	Honda CBR600RR	3	Accident	5	
Ret	21	(Japan) Katsuaki Fujiwara	Kawasaki ZX-6R	3	Accident	8	
Ret	55	(Italy) Massimo Roccoli	Honda CBR600RR	2	Accident	7	

== Superstock 1000 race ==
Pos.	No.	Rider	Bike	Laps	Time/Retired	Grid	Points
1	19	(Belgium) Xavier Simeon	Ducati 1098R	12	18:54.713	1	25
2	71	(Italy) Claudio Corti	Suzuki GSX-R1000 K9	12	+1.600	22	20
3	21	(France) Maxime Berger	Honda CBR1000RR	12	+2.110	21	16
4	112	(Spain) Javier Forés	Kawasaki ZX-10R	12	+2.522	4	13
5	20	(France) Sylvain Barrier	Yamaha YZF-R1	12	+3.433	3	11
6	65	(France) Loris Baz	Yamaha YZF-R1	12	+5.596	2	10
7	29	(Italy) Daniele Beretta	Ducati 1098R	12	+9.556	13	9
8	16	(Netherlands) Raymond Schouten	Yamaha YZF-R1	12	+10.646	7	8
9	25	(United Kingdom) Gregg Black	Yamaha YZF-R1	12	+10.950	8	7
10	30	(Switzerland) Michaël Savary	Honda CBR1000RR	12	+11.252	14	6
11	86	(France) Loïc Napoleone	Suzuki GSX-R1000 K9	12	+11.933	27	5
12	69	(Czech Republic) Ondřej Ježek	Honda CBR1000RR	12	+12.621	26	4
13	7	(Austria) René Mähr	Suzuki GSX-R1000 K9	12	+14.915	19	3
14	53	(Germany) Dominic Lammert	Suzuki GSX-R1000 K9	12	+19.942	10	2
15	77	(United Kingdom) Barry Burrell	Honda CBR1000RR	12	+21.417	32	1
16	34	(Italy) Danilo Giugliano	MV Agusta F4 312 R	12	+22.865	6	
17	107	(Italy) Niccolò Rosso	Yamaha YZF-R1	12	+23.303	12	
18	49	(United Kingdom) Conor Cummins	Yamaha YZF-R1	12	+23.775	30	
19	51	(Spain) Santiago Barragán	Honda CBR1000RR	12	+24.752	34	
20	91	(Sweden) Hampus Johansson	Yamaha YZF-R1	12	+26.926	24	
21	84	(Italy) Fabio Massei	Yamaha YZF-R1	12	+30.025	23	
22	57	(Norway) Arne Sletten	Yamaha YZF-R1	12	+34.516	11	
23	72	(France) Nicolas Pouhair	Yamaha YZF-R1	12	+34.751	16	
24	45	(Italy) Luca Verdini	Yamaha YZF-R1	12	+42.004	17	
25	8	(Italy) Andrea Antonelli	Yamaha YZF-R1	12	+47.194	20	
26	111	(Spain) Ismael Ortega	Kawasaki ZX-10R	12	+56.220	28	
27	36	(Brazil) Philippe Thiriet	Honda CBR1000RR	12	+1:01.499	33	
28	64	(Brazil) Danilo Andric	Yamaha YZF-R1	12	+1:36.694	31	
Ret	12	(Italy) Nico Vivarelli	Honda CBR1000RR	8	Accident	25	
Ret	63	(Sweden) Per Björk	Honda CBR1000RR	8	Accident	29	
Ret	22	(United Kingdom) Alex Lowes	MV Agusta F4 312 R	8	Retirement	9	
Ret	23	(Italy) Federico Sandi	Aprilia RSV4 Factory	5	Accident	18	
Ret	93	(France) Mathieu Lussiana	Yamaha YZF-R1	4	Retirement	5	
Ret	131	(Italy) Patrizio Valsecchi	Yamaha YZF-R1	0	Accident	15	
DNS	14	(Italy) Federico Biaggi	Aprilia RSV4 Factory		Did not start		

== Superstock 600 race classification ==
Pos.	No.	Rider	Bike	Laps	Time/Retired	Grid	Points
1	5	(Italy) Marco Bussolotti	Yamaha YZF-R6	10	16:18.425	4	25
2	4	(United Kingdom) Gino Rea	Honda CBR600RR	10	+0.213	2	20
3	11	(France) Jérémy Guarnoni	Yamaha YZF-R6	10	+2.126	6	16
4	7	(France) Baptiste Guittet	Honda CBR600RR	10	+6.948	7	13
5	89	(Austria) Stefan Kerschbaumer	Yamaha YZF-R6	10	+11.136	9	11
6	19	(Italy) Nico Morelli	Yamaha YZF-R6	10	+14.695	11	10
7	36	(Poland) Andrzej Chmielewski	Yamaha YZF-R6	10	+14.780	13	9
8	55	(Belgium) Vincent Lonbois	Yamaha YZF-R6	10	+16.782	3	8
9	9	(Italy) Danilo Petrucci	Yamaha YZF-R6	10	+16.997	1	7
10	12	(Italy) Riccardo Cecchini	Honda CBR600RR	10	+18.251	14	6
11	53	(United Kingdom) Joe Burns	Yamaha YZF-R6	10	+21.083	12	5
12	47	(Italy) Eddi La Marra	Honda CBR600RR	10	+26.965	5	4
13	72	(Norway) Fredrik Karlsen	Yamaha YZF-R6	10	+29.434	10	3
14	10	(Spain) Nacho Calero	Yamaha YZF-R6	10	+29.958	16	2
15	132	(Italy) Daniele Manfrinati	Honda CBR600RR	10	+32.667	17	1
16	26	(Romania) Mircea Vrăjitoru	Yamaha YZF-R6	10	+39.185	18	
17	81	(Czech Republic) David Látr	Honda CBR600RR	10	+40.666	15	
18	30	(Romania) Bogdan Vrăjitoru	Yamaha YZF-R6	10	+1:22.236	19	
Ret	130	(Republic of Ireland) Jamie Hamilton	Kawasaki ZX-6R	2	Accident	8	
