= 2009 Superbike World Championship =

2009 Superbike World Championship
Previous:	2008	Next:	2010
Support series: Supersport World Championship; FIM Superstock 1000 Cup; European Superstock 600 Championship

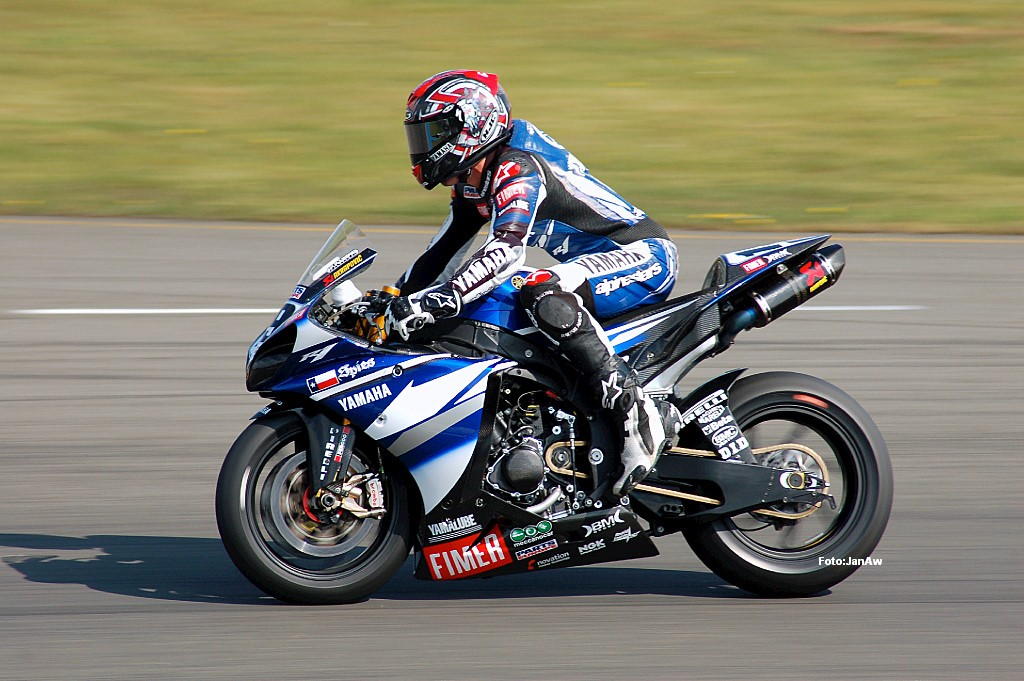
Series rookie Ben Spies held off veteran Noriyuki Haga to win the title by six points. Spies did not defend his title in 2010, as he replaced James Toseland at the Tech 3 team in MotoGP.

The 2009 Superbike World Championship was the twenty-second season of the Superbike World Championship. It was the second season in which HANNspree had been the title sponsor of the championship. The South African round returned on 15–17 May at Kyalami for first time since the 2002 season that the Superbike World Championship had raced there; other changes in the calendar were the return of Imola after a two-season absence as the replacement for Vallelunga and the discontinuation of Brands Hatch as one of the British venues.

The season saw the revision of the Superpole system, as the single-lap format was replaced by a three-part knockout system: after two timed qualifying sessions, the twenty fastest riders were admitted to Superpole 1, then the first sixteen SP1 riders progressed to Superpole 2 and the first eight SP2 riders contested Superpole 3, which finally awarded the pole position. In addition, changing bike during a race (also known as flag-to-flag) was allowed in order to avoid interruptions caused by variable weather conditions.

Ben Spies won the championship in his rookie season, bettering Noriyuki Haga in a final round decider. Ducati were the winners of the manufacturers' championship, winning eleven races.

== Race calendar and results ==
2009 Superbike World Championship Calendar
Round		Country	Circuit	Date	Superpole	Fastest lap	Winning rider	Winning team	Report
1	R1	Australia	Phillip Island Grand Prix Circuit	1 March	(United States) Ben Spies	(Australia) Troy Corser	(Japan) Noriyuki Haga	Ducati Xerox Team	Report
1	R2	Australia	Phillip Island Grand Prix Circuit	1 March	(United States) Ben Spies	(Japan) Noriyuki Haga	(United States) Ben Spies	Yamaha WSB	Report
2	R1	Qatar	Losail International Circuit	14 March	(United States) Ben Spies	(Japan) Noriyuki Haga	(United States) Ben Spies	Yamaha WSB	Report
2	R2	Qatar	Losail International Circuit	14 March	(United States) Ben Spies	(United States) Ben Spies	(United States) Ben Spies	Yamaha WSB	Report
3	R1	Spain	Circuit Ricardo Tormo	5 April	(United States) Ben Spies	(Japan) Noriyuki Haga	(Japan) Noriyuki Haga	Ducati Xerox Team	Report
3	R2	Spain	Circuit Ricardo Tormo	5 April	(United States) Ben Spies	(Japan) Noriyuki Haga	(Japan) Noriyuki Haga	Ducati Xerox Team	Report
4	R1	Netherlands	TT Circuit Assen	26 April	(United States) Ben Spies	(United Kingdom) Leon Haslam	(United States) Ben Spies	Yamaha WSB	Report
4	R2	Netherlands	TT Circuit Assen	26 April	(United States) Ben Spies	(Japan) Noriyuki Haga	(Japan) Noriyuki Haga	Ducati Xerox Team	Report
5	R1	Italy	Autodromo Nazionale di Monza	10 May	(United States) Ben Spies	(Italy) Michel Fabrizio	(Italy) Michel Fabrizio	Ducati Xerox Team	Report
5	R2	Italy	Autodromo Nazionale di Monza	10 May	(United States) Ben Spies	(United States) Ben Spies	(United States) Ben Spies	Yamaha WSB	Report
6	R1	South Africa	Kyalami	17 May	(United States) Ben Spies	(Italy) Michel Fabrizio	(Japan) Noriyuki Haga	Ducati Xerox Team	Report
6	R2	South Africa	Kyalami	17 May	(United States) Ben Spies	(Japan) Noriyuki Haga	(Japan) Noriyuki Haga	Ducati Xerox Team	Report
7	R1	United States	Miller Motorsports Park	31 May	(United States) Ben Spies	(United States) Ben Spies	(United States) Ben Spies	Yamaha WSB	Report
7	R2	United States	Miller Motorsports Park	31 May	(United States) Ben Spies	(United States) Ben Spies	(United States) Ben Spies	Yamaha WSB	Report
8	R1	Europe	Misano World Circuit	21 June	(Czech Republic) Jakub Smrž	(Czech Republic) Jakub Smrž	(United States) Ben Spies	Yamaha WSB	Report
8	R2	Europe	Misano World Circuit	21 June	(Czech Republic) Jakub Smrž	(Japan) Noriyuki Haga	(United Kingdom) Jonathan Rea	HANNspree Ten Kate Honda	Report
9	R1	(United Kingdom) Great Britain	Donington Park	28 June	(United States) Ben Spies	(United States) Ben Spies	(United States) Ben Spies	Yamaha WSB	Report
9	R2	(United Kingdom) Great Britain	Donington Park	28 June	(United States) Ben Spies	(United States) Ben Spies	(United States) Ben Spies	Yamaha WSB	Report
10	R1	Czech Republic	Masaryk Circuit	26 July	(United States) Ben Spies	(Italy) Michel Fabrizio	(Italy) Max Biaggi	Aprilia Racing	Report
10	R2	Czech Republic	Masaryk Circuit	26 July	(United States) Ben Spies	(Italy) Max Biaggi	(United States) Ben Spies	Yamaha WSB	Report
11	R1	Germany	Nürburgring	6 September	(Japan) Noriyuki Haga	(Japan) Noriyuki Haga	(United States) Ben Spies	Yamaha WSB	Report
11	R2	Germany	Nürburgring	6 September	(Japan) Noriyuki Haga	(United Kingdom) Jonathan Rea	(United Kingdom) Jonathan Rea	HANNspree Ten Kate Honda	Report
12	R1	San Marino	Autodromo Enzo e Dino Ferrari	27 September	(Italy) Michel Fabrizio	(Italy) Michel Fabrizio	(Japan) Noriyuki Haga	Ducati Xerox Team	Report
12	R2	San Marino	Autodromo Enzo e Dino Ferrari	27 September	(Italy) Michel Fabrizio	(Japan) Noriyuki Haga	(Italy) Michel Fabrizio	Ducati Xerox Team	Report
13	R1	France	Circuit de Nevers Magny-Cours	4 October	(United States) Ben Spies	(Japan) Noriyuki Haga	(United States) Ben Spies	Yamaha WSB	Report
13	R2	France	Circuit de Nevers Magny-Cours	4 October	(United States) Ben Spies	(United Kingdom) Jonathan Rea	(Japan) Noriyuki Haga	Ducati Xerox Team	Report
14	R1	Portugal	Autódromo Internacional do Algarve	25 October	(United States) Ben Spies	(Italy) Michel Fabrizio	(United States) Ben Spies	Yamaha WSB	Report
14	R2	Portugal	Autódromo Internacional do Algarve	25 October	(United States) Ben Spies	(Italy) Michel Fabrizio	(Italy) Michel Fabrizio	Ducati Xerox Team	Report

== Entry list ==
2009 entry list
Team	Constructor	Motorcycle	No.	Rider	Rounds
(Japan) Kawasaki World Superbike R.T.	Kawasaki	Kawasaki ZX-10R	2	(United States) Jamie Hacking	7–9
(Japan) Kawasaki World Superbike R.T.	Kawasaki	Kawasaki ZX-10R	23	(Australia) Broc Parkes	1–3, 5–14
(Japan) Kawasaki World Superbike R.T.	Kawasaki	Kawasaki ZX-10R	32	(United Kingdom) Stuart Easton	4
(Japan) Kawasaki World Superbike R.T.	Kawasaki	Kawasaki ZX-10R	100	(Japan) Makoto Tamada	1–5, 10–12, 14
(Japan) Kawasaki World Superbike R.T.	Kawasaki	Kawasaki ZX-10R	132	(South Africa) Sheridan Morais	6, 13
(Italy) Aprilia Racing	Aprilia	Aprilia RSV4 Factory	3	(Italy) Max Biaggi	All
(Italy) Aprilia Racing	Aprilia	Aprilia RSV4 Factory	56	(Japan) Shinya Nakano	1–11
(Italy) Aprilia Racing	Aprilia	Aprilia RSV4 Factory	58	(Italy) Marco Simoncelli	12
(Italy) Aprilia Racing	Aprilia	Aprilia RSV4 Factory	22	(United Kingdom) Leon Camier	13–14
(Netherlands) HANNspree Ten Kate Honda	Honda	Honda CBR1000RR	7	(Spain) Carlos Checa	All
(Netherlands) HANNspree Ten Kate Honda	Honda	Honda CBR1000RR	65	(United Kingdom) Jonathan Rea	All
(Netherlands) Ten Kate Honda Racing	Honda	Honda CBR1000RR	9	(Japan) Ryuichi Kiyonari	All
(Italy) DFX Corse	Ducati	Ducati 1098R	10	(Spain) Fonsi Nieto	10–14
(Italy) DFX Corse	Ducati	Ducati 1098R	55	(France) Régis Laconi	1–6
(Italy) DFX Corse	Ducati	Ducati 1098R	57	(Italy) Lorenzo Lanzi	7–10, 12
(Belgium) Suzuki Alstare BRUX (Japan) Team Suzuki Alstare	Suzuki	Suzuki GSX-R1000 K9	10	(Spain) Fonsi Nieto	6–8
(Belgium) Suzuki Alstare BRUX (Japan) Team Suzuki Alstare	Suzuki	Suzuki GSX-R1000 K9	31	(Australia) Karl Muggeridge	11–13
(Belgium) Suzuki Alstare BRUX (Japan) Team Suzuki Alstare	Suzuki	Suzuki GSX-R1000 K9	50	(France) Sylvain Guintoli	14
(Belgium) Suzuki Alstare BRUX (Japan) Team Suzuki Alstare	Suzuki	Suzuki GSX-R1000 K9	71	(Japan) Yukio Kagayama	All
(Belgium) Suzuki Alstare BRUX (Japan) Team Suzuki Alstare	Suzuki	Suzuki GSX-R1000 K9	76	(Germany) Max Neukirchner	1–5
(Belgium) Suzuki Alstare BRUX (Japan) Team Suzuki Alstare	Suzuki	Suzuki GSX-R1000 K9	79	(United States) Blake Young	9
(Germany) BMW Motorrad Motorsport	BMW	BMW S1000RR	11	(Australia) Troy Corser	1–5, 7–14
(Germany) BMW Motorrad Motorsport	BMW	BMW S1000RR	17	(Australia) Steve Martin	6
(Germany) BMW Motorrad Motorsport	BMW	BMW S1000RR	47	(United Kingdom) Richard Cooper	11
(Germany) BMW Motorrad Motorsport	BMW	BMW S1000RR	111	(Spain) Rubén Xaus	1–10, 12–14
(Italy) HANNspree Honda Althea (Italy) Honda Althea Racing	Honda	Honda CBR1000RR	14	(France) Matthieu Lagrive	8–12, 14
(Italy) HANNspree Honda Althea (Italy) Honda Althea Racing	Honda	Honda CBR1000RR	33	(United Kingdom) Tommy Hill	1–7
(Italy) HANNspree Honda Althea (Italy) Honda Althea Racing	Honda	Honda CBR1000RR	40	(Italy) Flavio Gentile	13
(San Marino) PSG-1 Corse	Kawasaki	Kawasaki ZX-10R	15	(Italy) Matteo Baiocco	1–5, 8
(San Marino) PSG-1 Corse	Kawasaki	Kawasaki ZX-10R	86	(Italy) Ayrton Badovini	1–3
(Italy) Guandalini Racing	Ducati	Ducati 1098R	15	(Italy) Matteo Baiocco	11–14
(Italy) Guandalini Racing	Ducati	Ducati 1098R	24	(Australia) Brendan Roberts	1–5
(Italy) Guandalini Racing	Ducati	Ducati 1098R	36	(Spain) Gregorio Lavilla	6–9
(Italy) Guandalini Racing	Ducati	Ducati 1098R	96	(Czech Republic) Jakub Smrž	All
(Japan) Yamaha WSB	Yamaha	Yamaha YZF-R1	19	(United States) Ben Spies	All
(Japan) Yamaha WSB	Yamaha	Yamaha YZF-R1	66	(United Kingdom) Tom Sykes	All
(United Kingdom) Airwaves Yamaha	Yamaha	Yamaha YZF-R1	22	(United Kingdom) Leon Camier	9
(United Kingdom) Airwaves Yamaha	Yamaha	Yamaha YZF-R1	27	(United Kingdom) James Ellison	9
(Italy) Team Pedercini	Kawasaki	Kawasaki ZX-10R	25	(Spain) David Salom	All
(Italy) Team Pedercini	Kawasaki	Kawasaki ZX-10R	99	(Italy) Luca Scassa	All
(Italy) Celani Race	Suzuki	Suzuki GSX-R1000 K9	31	(Australia) Karl Muggeridge	1–7
(Italy) Celani Race	Suzuki	Suzuki GSX-R1000 K9	53	(Italy) Alessandro Polita	8–10
(Italy) Ducati Xerox Team	Ducati	Ducati 1098R	41	(Japan) Noriyuki Haga	All
(Italy) Ducati Xerox Team	Ducati	Ducati 1098R	84	(Italy) Michel Fabrizio	All
(Sweden) Stiggy Racing Honda	Honda	Honda CBR1000RR	44	(Italy) Roberto Rolfo	1–2
(Sweden) Stiggy Racing Honda	Honda	Honda CBR1000RR	91	(United Kingdom) Leon Haslam	All
(Sweden) Stiggy Racing Honda	Honda	Honda CBR1000RR	98	(United States) Jake Zemke	5, 7
(Sweden) Stiggy Racing Honda	Honda	Honda CBR1000RR	121	(United States) John Hopkins	3–4, 8–11
Yamaha France GMT 94 IPONE	Yamaha	Yamaha YZF-R1	49	(South Africa) Shaun Whyte	6
Yamaha France GMT 94 IPONE	Yamaha	Yamaha YZF-R1	64	(France) Erwan Nigon	7
Yamaha France GMT 94 IPONE	Yamaha	Yamaha YZF-R1	94	(Spain) David Checa	3–5, 8–14
(Czech Republic) ProRace	Suzuki	Suzuki GSX-R1000 K9	51	(Czech Republic) Miloš Čihák	10
(Italy) Team Sterilgarda	Ducati	Ducati 1098R	67	(United Kingdom) Shane Byrne	All
(Italy) Squadra Corse Italia	Honda	Honda CBR1000RR	77	(Italy) Vittorio Iannuzzo	1–5, 8–14
TKR Suzuki Switzerland	Suzuki	Suzuki GSX-R1000 K9	88	(Austria) Roland Resch	3–5, 8–11, 13–14
(United Kingdom) MSS Colchester Kawasaki	Kawasaki	Kawasaki ZX-10R	117	(United Kingdom) Simon Andrews	9
(Italy) Barni Racing Team	Ducati	Ducati 1098R	124	(Italy) Luca Conforti	12

Key
Regular rider
Wildcard rider
Replacement rider

- All entries utilized Pirelli tyres.

== Championship standings ==
=== Riders' standings ===
2009 final riders' standings
Pos.	Rider	Bike	AUS (Australia)		QAT (Qatar)		SPA (Spain)		NED (Netherlands)		ITA (Italy)		RSA (South Africa)		USA (United States)		SMR (San Marino)		GBR (United Kingdom)		CZE (Czech Republic)		GER (Germany)		ITA (Italy)		FRA (France)		POR (Portugal)		Pts
Pos.	Rider	Bike	R1	R2	R1	R2	R1	R2	R1	R2	R1	R2	R1	R2	R1	R2	R1	R2	R1	R2	R1	R2	R1	R2	R1	R2	R1	R2	R1	R2	Pts
1	(United States) Ben Spies	Yamaha	**16**	**1**	**1**	**1**	**Ret**	**2**	**1**	**Ret**	**15**	**1**	**3**	**Ret**	**1**	**1**	1	9	**1**	**1**	**Ret**	**1**	1	2	4	5	**1**	**4**	**1**	**5**	462
2	(Japan) Noriyuki Haga	Ducati	1	2	2	2	1	1	2	1	2	Ret	1	1	9	8	5	3	3	Ret	8	6	**2**	**Ret**	1	2	2	1	Ret	2	456
3	(Italy) Michel Fabrizio	Ducati	4	5	Ret	Ret	2	3	9	4	1	2	2	2	3	2	3	2	12	3	Ret	3	7	9	**3**	**1**	4	13	5	1	382
4	(Italy) Max Biaggi	Aprilia	11	15	3	3	8	8	5	Ret	11	5	5	5	6	4	13	10	2	21	1	2	5	4	2	4	3	2	3	6	319
5	(United Kingdom) Jonathan Rea	Honda	5	9	12	8	Ret	13	7	5	5	4	4	3	5	3	7	1	7	15	3	4	4	1	7	6	Ret	3	2	3	315
6	(United Kingdom) Leon Haslam	Honda	6	3	11	11	5	5	3	2	Ret	7	Ret	4	10	Ret	12	8	4	2	7	12	6	5	6	8	5	5	Ret	Ret	241
7	(Spain) Carlos Checa	Honda	12	13	5	13	Ret	6	Ret	7	9	10	6	6	2	Ret	11	5	11	Ret	2	5	3	3	Ret	10	6	9	7	Ret	209
8	(United Kingdom) Shane Byrne	Ducati	Ret	Ret	6	12	9	11	11	8	14	18	9	Ret	11	10	2	6	5	4	4	8	10	Ret	Ret	7	8	7	4	4	192
9	(United Kingdom) Tom Sykes	Yamaha	10	10	7	5	7	10	4	6	6	6	10	9	13	9	8	7	Ret	5	Ret	7	9	8	9	12	Ret	Ret	DNS	DNS	176
10	(Czech Republic) Jakub Smrž	Ducati	9	7	Ret	17	Ret	14	6	3	12	8	14	10	8	6	**4**	**4**	9	Ret	6	9	13	11	8	9	10	Ret	Ret	8	169
11	(Japan) Ryuichi Kiyonari	Honda	Ret	23	8	4	12	9	15	Ret	3	3	12	13	4	5	Ret	14	10	7	13	13	14	7	5	17	Ret	DNS	DNS	DNS	141
12	(Japan) Yukio Kagayama	Suzuki	3	8	22	15	6	Ret	Ret	12	4	17	8	8	12	12	6	11	17	13	14	Ret	15	10	15	Ret	7	6	Ret	11	128
13	(Australia) Troy Corser	BMW	8	22	9	9	Ret	15	10	10	Ret	DNS			15	17	Ret	19	Ret	20	5	10	8	6	11	Ret	9	10	Ret	9	96
14	(Japan) Shinya Nakano	Aprilia	15	12	4	7	DNS	DNS	Ret	DNS	13	12	7	7	Ret	7	9	13	6	Ret	Ret	11	Ret	DNS							86
15	(France) Régis Laconi	Ducati	7	4	10	14	4	4	8	16	8	11	WD	WD																	77
16	(Germany) Max Neukirchner	Suzuki	2	6	Ret	6	3	7	13	9	DNS	DNS																			75
17	(Spain) Rubén Xaus	BMW	19	11	13	10	13	16	14	11	7	9	Ret	Ret	21	16	14	16	15	9	Ret	DNS			12	13	11	12	8	Ret	74
18	(Australia) Broc Parkes	Kawasaki	Ret	18	14	16	10	17			10	13	15	14	Ret	11	17	17	18	14	12	16	Ret	13	10	15	Ret	15	11	12	51
19	(France) Matthieu Lagrive	Honda															10	21	16	12	9	14	11	Ret	Ret	Ret			9	13	34
20	(United Kingdom) Leon Camier	Yamaha																	13	6											32
20	(United Kingdom) Leon Camier	Aprilia																									Ret	Ret	6	7	32
21	(Spain) Fonsi Nieto	Suzuki											16	15	16	13	18	12													22
21	(Spain) Fonsi Nieto	Ducati																			11	17	Ret	12	Ret	Ret	Ret	11	Ret	Ret	22
22	(Australia) Karl Muggeridge	Suzuki	Ret	21	16	18	16	19	12	Ret	16	Ret	18	Ret	Ret	DNS							12	Ret	13	14	Ret	8			21
23	(United States) John Hopkins	Honda					11	12	WD	WD							DNS	DNS	8	DNS	Ret	Ret	DNS	DNS							17
24	(Italy) Matteo Baiocco	Kawasaki	Ret	24	19	22	20	Ret	Ret	14	17	15					Ret	Ret													17
24	(Italy) Matteo Baiocco	Ducati																					Ret	16	14	16	12	14	10	Ret	17
25	(Italy) Marco Simoncelli	Aprilia																							Ret	3					16
26	(Italy) Lorenzo Lanzi	Ducati													17	14	19	18	14	11	Ret	15			Ret	11					15
27	(Japan) Makoto Tamada	Kawasaki	18	17	DNS	DNS	14	Ret	17	Ret	DNS	DNS									10	Ret	DNS	DNS	Ret	DNS			12	16	12
28	(Spain) Gregorio Lavilla	Ducati											11	12	14	Ret	22	15	Ret	18											12
29	(Italy) Luca Scassa	Kawasaki	20	20	17	20	18	24	Ret	15	23	14	17	Ret	19	Ret	Ret	20	19	16	16	Ret	16	14	16	18	13	Ret	15	14	11
30	(United States) Jamie Hacking	Kawasaki													7	19	16	22	21	Ret											9
31	(United Kingdom) James Ellison	Yamaha																	Ret	8											8
32	(South Africa) Sheridan Morais	Kawasaki											13	11													Ret	19			8
33	(France) Sylvain Guintoli	Suzuki																											Ret	10	6
34	(United Kingdom) Simon Andrews	Kawasaki																	20	10											6
35	(United Kingdom) Tommy Hill	Honda	14	14	15	Ret	15	22	Ret	Ret	20	16	19	17	DNS	DNS															6
36	(Spain) David Salom	Kawasaki	21	25	18	Ret	19	21	20	Ret	19	21	20	16	20	18	23	Ret	23	19	17	Ret	17	17	18	Ret	14	16	13	17	5
37	(Spain) David Checa	Yamaha					Ret	20	19	Ret	22	19					21	Ret	24	Ret	18	19	Ret	18	17	Ret	15	17	14	15	4
38	(Australia) Brendan Roberts	Ducati	17	19	21	19	Ret	18	16	13	DNS	DNS																			3
39	(Italy) Roberto Rolfo	Honda	13	16	Ret	Ret																									3
40	(Italy) Vittorio Iannuzzo	Honda	Ret	Ret	20	21	Ret	23	Ret	Ret	21	DSQ					20	24	Ret	Ret	15	18	Ret	15	Ret	Ret	Ret	Ret	Ret	Ret	2
41	(Italy) Alessandro Polita	Suzuki															15	23	22	Ret	Ret	Ret									1
42	(United States) Jake Zemke	Honda									18	20			18	15															1
	(Austria) Roland Resch	Suzuki					Ret	25	21	17	24	Ret					NC	25	Ret	Ret	19	20	18	Ret			16	18	Ret	DNS	0
	(United States) Blake Young	Suzuki																	25	17											0
	(Italy) Ayrton Badovini	Kawasaki	DNS	DNS	Ret	Ret	17	Ret																							0
	(Italy) Flavio Gentile	Honda																									17	DNS			0
	(Australia) Steve Martin	BMW											22	18																	0
	(United Kingdom) Stuart Easton	Kawasaki							18	Ret																					0
	(South Africa) Shaun Whyte	Yamaha											21	19																	0
	(Czech Republic) Miloš Čihák	Suzuki																			20	Ret									0
	(France) Erwan Nigon	Yamaha													22	Ret															0
	(United Kingdom) Richard Cooper	BMW																					Ret	Ret							0
	(Italy) Luca Conforti	Ducati																							Ret	DNS					0
Pos.	Rider	Bike	AUS (Australia)		QAT (Qatar)		SPA (Spain)		NED (Netherlands)		ITA (Italy)		RSA (South Africa)		USA (United States)		SMR (San Marino)		GBR (United Kingdom)		CZE (Czech Republic)		GER (Germany)		ITA (Italy)		FRA (France)		POR (Portugal)		Pts

Colour	Result
Gold	Winner
Silver	Second place
Bronze	Third place
Green	Points classification
Blue	Non-points classification
Blue	Non-classified finish (NC)
Purple	Retired, not classified (Ret)
Red	Did not qualify (DNQ)
Red	Did not pre-qualify (DNPQ)
Black	Disqualified (DSQ)
White	Did not start (DNS)
White	Withdrew (WD)
White	Race cancelled (C)
Blank	Did not practice (DNP)
Blank	Did not arrive (DNA)
Blank	Excluded (EX)

**Bold** – Pole position
Italics – Fastest lap

=== Teams' standings ===
Pos.	Team	Bike No.	AUS (Australia)		QAT (Qatar)		SPA (Spain)		NED (Netherlands)		ITA (Italy)		RSA (South Africa)		USA (United States)		SMR (San Marino)		GBR (United Kingdom)		CZE (Czech Republic)		GER (Germany)		ITA (Italy)		FRA (France)		POR (Portugal)		Pts.
Pos.	Team	Bike No.	R1	R2	R1	R2	R1	R2	R1	R2	R1	R2	R1	R2	R1	R2	R1	R2	R1	R2	R1	R2	R1	R2	R1	R2	R1	R2	R1	R2	Pts.
1	(Italy) Ducati Xerox Team	41	1	2	2	2	1	1	2	1	2	Ret	1	1	9	8	5	3	3	Ret	8	6	**2**	**Ret**	1	2	2	1	Ret	2	838
1	(Italy) Ducati Xerox Team	84	4	5	Ret	Ret	2	3	9	4	1	2	2	2	3	2	3	2	12	3	Ret	3	7	9	**3**	**1**	4	13	5	1	838
2	(Japan) Yamaha World Superbike	19	**16**	**1**	**1**	**1**	**Ret**	**2**	**1**	**Ret**	**15**	**1**	**3**	**Ret**	**1**	**1**	1	9	**1**	**1**	**Ret**	**1**	1	2	4	5	**1**	**4**	**1**	**5**	638
2	(Japan) Yamaha World Superbike	66	10	10	7	5	7	10	4	6	6	6	10	9	13	9	8	7	Ret	5	Ret	7	9	8	9	12	Ret	Ret	DNS	DNS	638
3	(Netherlands) HANNspree Ten Kate Honda	7	12	13	5	13	Ret	6	Ret	7	9	10	6	6	2	Ret	11	5	11	Ret	2	5	3	3	Ret	10	6	9	7	Ret	524
3	(Netherlands) HANNspree Ten Kate Honda	65	5	9	12	8	Ret	13	7	5	5	4	4	3	5	3	7	1	7	15	3	4	4	1	7	6	Ret	3	2	3	524
4	(Italy) Aprilia Racing	3	11	15	3	3	8	8	5	Ret	11	5	5	5	6	4	13	10	2	21	1	2	5	4	2	4	3	2	3	6	440
4	(Italy) Aprilia Racing	22																									Ret	Ret	6	7	440
4	(Italy) Aprilia Racing	56	15	12	4	7	DNS	DNS	Ret	DNS	13	12	7	7	Ret	7	9	13	6	Ret	Ret	11	Ret	DNS							440
4	(Italy) Aprilia Racing	58																							Ret	3					440
5	(Sweden) Stiggy Racing Honda	44	13	16	Ret	Ret																									262
5	(Sweden) Stiggy Racing Honda	91	6	3	11	11	5	5	3	2	Ret	7	Ret	4	10	Ret	12	8	4	2	7	12	6	5	6	8	5	5	Ret	Ret	262
5	(Sweden) Stiggy Racing Honda	98									18	20			18	15															262
5	(Sweden) Stiggy Racing Honda	121					11	12	WD	WD							DNS	DNS	8	DNS	Ret	Ret	DNS	DNS							262
6	(Belgium) Suzuki Alstare BRUX; Team Suzuki Alstare	10											16	15	16	13	18	12													234
6	(Belgium) Suzuki Alstare BRUX; Team Suzuki Alstare	31																					12	Ret	13	14	Ret	8			234
6	(Belgium) Suzuki Alstare BRUX; Team Suzuki Alstare	50																											Ret	10	234
6	(Belgium) Suzuki Alstare BRUX; Team Suzuki Alstare	71	3	8	22	15	6	Ret	Ret	12	4	17	8	8	12	12	6	11	17	13	14	Ret	15	10	15	Ret	7	6	Ret	11	234
6	(Belgium) Suzuki Alstare BRUX; Team Suzuki Alstare	76	2	6	Ret	6	3	7	13	9	DNS	DNS																			234
6	(Belgium) Suzuki Alstare BRUX; Team Suzuki Alstare	79																	25	17											234
7	(Italy) Guandalini Racing	15																					Ret	16	14	16	12	14	10	Ret	198
7	(Italy) Guandalini Racing	24	17	19	21	19	Ret	18	16	13	DNS	DNS																			198
7	(Italy) Guandalini Racing	36											11	12	14	Ret	22	15	Ret	18											198
7	(Italy) Guandalini Racing	96	9	7	Ret	17	Ret	14	6	3	12	8	14	10	8	6	**4**	**4**	9	Ret	6	9	13	11	8	9	10	Ret	Ret	8	198
8	(Italy) Team Sterilgarda	67	Ret	Ret	6	12	9	11	11	8	14	18	9	Ret	11	10	2	6	5	4	4	8	10	Ret	Ret	7	8	7	4	4	192
9	(Germany) BMW Motorrad Motorsport	11	8	22	9	9	Ret	15	10	10	Ret	DNS			15	17	Ret	19	Ret	20	5	10	8	6	11	Ret	9	10	Ret	9	170
9	(Germany) BMW Motorrad Motorsport	17											22	18																	170
9	(Germany) BMW Motorrad Motorsport	47																					Ret	Ret							170
9	(Germany) BMW Motorrad Motorsport	111	19	11	13	10	13	16	14	11	7	9	Ret	Ret	21	16	14	16	15	9	Ret	DNS			12	13	11	12	8	Ret	170
10	(Netherlands) Ten Kate Honda Racing	9	Ret	23	8	4	12	9	15	Ret	3	3	12	13	4	5	Ret	14	10	7	13	13	14	7	5	17	Ret	DNS	DNS	DNS	141
11	(Italy) DFX Corse	10																			11	17	Ret	12	Ret	Ret	Ret	11	Ret	Ret	101
11	(Italy) DFX Corse	55	7	4	10	14	4	4	8	16	8	11	WD	WD																	101
11	(Italy) DFX Corse	57													17	14	19	18	14	11	Ret	15									101
12	(Japan) Kawasaki World Superbike R.T.	2													7	19	16	22	21	Ret											80
12	(Japan) Kawasaki World Superbike R.T.	23	Ret	18	14	16	10	17			10	13	15	14	Ret	11	17	17	18	14	12	16	Ret	13	10	15	Ret	15	11	12	80
12	(Japan) Kawasaki World Superbike R.T.	32							18	Ret																					80
12	(Japan) Kawasaki World Superbike R.T.	100	18	17	DNS	DNS	14	Ret	17	Ret	DNS	DNS									10	Ret	DNS	DNS	Ret	DNS			12	16	80
12	(Japan) Kawasaki World Superbike R.T.	132											13	11													Ret	19			80
13	(Italy) HANNspree Honda Althea; Honda Althea Racing	14															10	21	16	12	9	14	11	Ret	Ret	Ret			9	13	40
13	(Italy) HANNspree Honda Althea; Honda Althea Racing	33	14	14	15	Ret	15	22	Ret	Ret	20	16	19	17	DNS	DNS															40
13	(Italy) HANNspree Honda Althea; Honda Althea Racing	40																									17	DNS			40
14	(Italy) Team Pedercini	25	21	25	18	Ret	19	21	20	Ret	19	21	20	16	20	18	23	Ret	23	19	17	Ret	17	17	18	Ret	14	16	13	17	16
14	(Italy) Team Pedercini	99	20	20	17	20	18	24	Ret	15	23	14	17	Ret	19	Ret	Ret	20	19	16	16	Ret	16	14	16	18	13	Ret	15	14	16
15	(Italy) Celani Race	31	Ret	21	16	18	16	19	12	Ret	16	Ret	18	Ret	Ret	DNS															5
15	(Italy) Celani Race	53															15	23	22	Ret	Ret	Ret									5
16	Yamaha France GMT 94 IPONE	49											21	19																	4
16	Yamaha France GMT 94 IPONE	64													22	Ret															4
16	Yamaha France GMT 94 IPONE	94					Ret	20	19	Ret	22	19					21	Ret	24	Ret	18	19	Ret	18	17	Ret	15	17	14	15	4
17	(San Marino) PSG-1 Corse	15	Ret	24	19	22	20	Ret	Ret	14	17	15					Ret	Ret													3
17	(San Marino) PSG-1 Corse	86	DNS	DNS	Ret	Ret	17	Ret																							3
18	(Italy) Squadra Corse Italia	77	Ret	Ret	20	21	Ret	23	Ret	Ret	21	DSQ					20	24	Ret	Ret	15	18	Ret	15	Ret	Ret	Ret	Ret	Ret	Ret	2
19	TKR Suzuki Switzerland	88					Ret	25	21	17	24	Ret					NC	25	Ret	Ret	19	20	18	Ret			16	18	Ret	DNS	0
Pos.	Team	Bike No.	AUS (Australia)		QAT (Qatar)		SPA (Spain)		NED (Netherlands)		ITA (Italy)		RSA (South Africa)		USA (United States)		SMR (San Marino)		GBR (United Kingdom)		CZE (Czech Republic)		GER (Germany)		ITA (Italy)		FRA (France)		POR (Portugal)		Pts.

=== Manufacturers' standings ===
2009 final manufacturers' standings
Pos.	Manufacturer	AUS (Australia)		QAT (Qatar)		SPA (Spain)		NED (Netherlands)		ITA (Italy)		RSA (South Africa)		USA (United States)		SMR (San Marino)		GBR (United Kingdom)		CZE (Czech Republic)		GER (Germany)		ITA (Italy)		FRA (France)		POR (Portugal)		Pts
Pos.	Manufacturer	R1	R2	R1	R2	R1	R2	R1	R2	R1	R2	R1	R2	R1	R2	R1	R2	R1	R2	R1	R2	R1	R2	R1	R2	R1	R2	R1	R2	Pts
1	(Italy) Ducati	1	2	2	2	1	1	2	1	1	2	1	1	3	2	2	2	3	3	4	3	2	9	1	1	2	1	4	1	572
2	(Japan) Yamaha	10	1	1	1	7	2	1	6	6	1	3	9	1	1	1	7	1	1	18	1	1	2	4	5	1	4	1	5	505
3	(Japan) Honda	5	3	5	4	5	5	3	2	3	3	4	3	2	3	7	1	4	2	2	4	3	1	5	6	5	3	2	3	431
4	(Italy) Aprilia	11	12	3	3	8	8	5	Ret	11	5	5	5	6	4	9	10	2	21	1	2	5	4	2	3	3	2	3	6	329
5	(Japan) Suzuki	2	6	16	6	3	7	12	9	4	17	8	8	12	12	6	11	17	13	14	20	12	10	13	14	7	6	Ret	10	173
6	(Germany) BMW	8	11	9	9	13	15	10	10	7	9	22	18	15	16	14	16	15	9	5	10	8	6	11	13	9	10	8	9	141
7	(Japan) Kawasaki	18	17	14	16	10	17	17	14	10	13	13	11	7	11	16	17	18	10	10	16	16	13	10	15	13	15	11	12	76
Pos.	Manufacturer	AUS (Australia)		QAT (Qatar)		SPA (Spain)		NED (Netherlands)		ITA (Italy)		RSA (South Africa)		USA (United States)		SMR (San Marino)		GBR (United Kingdom)		CZE (Czech Republic)		GER (Germany)		ITA (Italy)		FRA (France)		POR (Portugal)		Pts
