= 2002 Superstock European Championship =

2002 FIM Superstock 1000 Cup
Previous:	2001	Next:	2003
Support series: Superbike World Championship; Supersport World Championship

The 2002 Superstock European Championship was the fourth season of the FIM Superstock championship. The season began on 10 March at Circuit Ricardo Tormo in Spain, and finished on 29 September at Autodromo Enzo e Dino Ferrari in Italy.

Vittorio Iannuzzo won the title after beating closest rival Walter Tortoroglio.

== Race calendar and results ==
2002 Calendar
Round	Date	Round	Circuit	Pole position	Fastest lap	Race winner	Winning team	Winning constructor
1	10 March	Spain	Circuit Ricardo Tormo	(Italy) Vittorio Iannuzzo	(Italy) Vittorio Iannuzzo	(Italy) Vittorio Iannuzzo	Alstare System Suzuki Italia	Suzuki
2	12 May	Italy	Autodromo Nazionale Monza	(Italy) Vittorio Iannuzzo	(Italy) Vittorio Iannuzzo	(Italy) Vittorio Iannuzzo	Alstare System Suzuki Italia	Suzuki
3	26 May	United Kingdom	Silverstone Circuit	(United Kingdom) Chris Burns	(Italy) Vittorio Iannuzzo	(United Kingdom) Chris Burns	Roundstone Racing	Suzuki
4	9 June	Germany	Lausitzring	(Italy) Vittorio Iannuzzo	(Italy) Vittorio Iannuzzo	(Italy) Vittorio Iannuzzo	Alstare System Suzuki Italia	Suzuki
5	23 June	San Marino	Autodromo di Santamonica	(Italy) Vittorio Iannuzzo	(Italy) Vittorio Iannuzzo	(Italy) Gianluca Vizziello	GIMotorsport	Yamaha
6	28 July	Europe	Brands Hatch	(Italy) Vittorio Iannuzzo	(United Kingdom) Chris Burns	(United Kingdom) Chris Burns	Roundstone Racing	Suzuki
7	1 September	Germany	Motorsport Arena Oschersleben	(Italy) Walter Tortoroglio	(Italy) Walter Tortoroglio	(Italy) Walter Tortoroglio	Rumi	Honda
8	8 September	Netherlands	TT Circuit Assen	(Italy) Vittorio Iannuzzo	(Republic of Ireland) Michael Laverty	(Republic of Ireland) Michael Laverty	E.M.S. Racing	Suzuki
9	29 September	Italy	Autodromo Enzo e Dino Ferrari	(Italy) Vittorio Iannuzzo	(Italy) Vittorio Iannuzzo	(Italy) Vittorio Iannuzzo	Alstare System Suzuki Italia	Suzuki

== Entry list ==
Team	Constructor	Motorcycle	No.	Rider	Rounds
Bike Service	Aprilia	Aprilia RSV 1000	70	(Italy) Ilario Dionisi	5
Bike Service	Aprilia	Aprilia RSV 1000	71	(Italy) Roberto Lunadei	5, 9
FBC Racing	Aprilia	Aprilia RSV 1000	76	(Italy) Enrico Pasini	7, 9
MIRacing	Aprilia	Aprilia RSV 1000	53	(Spain) Jose Manuel Hurtado	1
Tosi; Tonini	Aprilia	Aprilia RSV 1000	72	(Italy) Marco Tonini	5, 9
Arancia	Ducati	Ducati 998 S	52	(Spain) Sergio Fuertes	1
D.F.X. Racing Ducati Pirelli	Ducati	Ducati 998 S	12	(Italy) Lorenzo Alfonsi	All
D.F.X. Racing Ducati Pirelli	Ducati	Ducati 998 S	42	(Italy) Riccardo Chiarello	All
Flanders Motor Racing; MCT-Sitra	Ducati	Ducati 998 S	7	(Netherlands) Robert De Vries	All
Flanders Motor Racing; MCT-Sitra	Ducati	Ducati 998 S	11	(Belgium) Nicolas Saelens	All
Flanders Motor Racing; MCT-Sitra	Ducati	Ducati 998 S	80	(Netherlands) Ghisbert Van Ginhoven	8
Lowlands Racing	Ducati	Ducati 998 S	16	(Netherlands) John Bakker	1–6, 8–9
Rox Racing	Ducati	Ducati 998 S	21	(Italy) Sergio Ruggiero	All
Spaziotel Racing	Ducati	Ducati 998 S	22	(Italy) Christian Dal Corso	All
Harry Meyerink Transport	Honda	Honda CBR900RR	79	(Netherlands) Lee Bootsman	8
Intermoto Progres Ecoplast	Honda	Honda CBR900RR	45	(Czech Republic) Marek Červený	All
R.M.C.E.	Honda	Honda CBR900RR	51	(Spain) Raul Jacobo	1
Rumi	Honda	Honda CBR900RR	2	(Italy) Walter Tortoroglio	All
Rumi	Honda	Honda CBR900RR	3	(Italy) Fabrizio De Marco	All
Rumi	Honda	Honda CBR900RR	44	(Italy) Alessandro Brannetti	2–9
Rumi	Honda	Honda CBR900RR	73	(Switzerland) Hervé Gantner	7
UCL Racing Honda	Honda	Honda CBR900RR	23	(United Kingdom) Simon Andrews	1–8
UCL Racing Honda	Honda	Honda CBR900RR	24	(United Kingdom) Luke Quigley	1
Alstare System Suzuki Italia	Suzuki	Suzuki GSX 1000 R	28	(Italy) Giacomo Romanelli	All
Alstare System Suzuki Italia	Suzuki	Suzuki GSX 1000 R	31	(Italy) Vittorio Iannuzzo	All
Arbr 'A' Cames	Suzuki	Suzuki GSX 1000 R	33	(France) Ludovic Fourreau	1–6
Bender Four Star Racing	Suzuki	Suzuki GSX 1000 R	65	(Germany) Katja Poensgen	4
Bender Four Star Racing	Suzuki	Suzuki GSX 1000 R	66	(Germany) Benjamin Nabert	4–5, 7
Bob Racing	Suzuki	Suzuki GSX 1000 R	61	(Netherlands) Bob Withag	8
Brave	Suzuki	Suzuki GSX 1000 R	55	(Italy) Marco Tessarolo	2, 5, 9
Carfix Autoschade Damwoud	Suzuki	Suzuki GSX 1000 R	82	(Netherlands) Bertus Folkertsma	8
Celani	Suzuki	Suzuki GSX 1000 R	70	(Italy) Ilario Dionisi	9
Chrysalis Racing	Suzuki	Suzuki GSX 1000 R	58	(United Kingdom) Kieran Murphy	3, 6
Circuit Comunitat Valenciana	Suzuki	Suzuki GSX 1000 R	53	(Spain) Jose Manuel Hurtado	9
Circuit Comunitat Valenciana	Suzuki	Suzuki GSX 1000 R	54	(Spain) Alex Martinez	9
Delling	Suzuki	Suzuki GSX 1000 R	75	(Germany) Daniel Delling	7
E.M.S. Racing	Suzuki	Suzuki GSX 1000 R	68	(Republic of Ireland) Declan Swanton	1–5, 7
E.M.S. Racing	Suzuki	Suzuki GSX 1000 R	95	(Republic of Ireland) Michael Laverty	6, 8
Eti	Suzuki	Suzuki GSX 1000 R	62	(United Kingdom) Ross McCulloch	6
G.S. Racing	Suzuki	Suzuki GSX 1000 R	85	(Netherlands) Paul Mooijman	8
Hi-Peak Racing	Suzuki	Suzuki GSX 1000 R	9	(United Kingdom) Chris Miller	1–2
Hobbs Racing	Suzuki	Suzuki GSX 1000 R	63	(United Kingdom) Dennis Hobbs	6
ICSAT	Suzuki	Suzuki GSX 1000 R	34	(Belgium) Didier Van Keymeulen	All
Jentin Racing	Suzuki	Suzuki GSX 1000 R	24	(United Kingdom) Luke Quigley	2, 5–8
Jentin Racing	Suzuki	Suzuki GSX 1000 R	99	(United Kingdom) Matt Layt	1
K.S. Racing	Suzuki	Suzuki GSX 1000 R	49	(Belgium) Koen Vleugels	All
Karthin Suzuki	Suzuki	Suzuki GSX 1000 R	67	(Germany) Bjoern Steinmetz	4, 7
KF Racing	Suzuki	Suzuki GSX 1000 R	59	(United Kingdom) Kevin Falcke	3
LiveOnScreen Racing	Suzuki	Suzuki GSX 1000 R	4	(United Kingdom) Andy Notman	All
Lloyds Autobodies	Suzuki	Suzuki GSX 1000 R	57	(United Kingdom) Steve Brogan	3, 6, 8
MRI Competicion	Suzuki	Suzuki GSX 1000 R	54	(Spain) Alex Martinez	1
Roundstone Racing	Suzuki	Suzuki GSX 1000 R	56	(United Kingdom) Chris Burns	3, 6
Sacchi Corse Biassono R.	Suzuki	Suzuki GSX 1000 R	8	(Italy) Dario Tosolini	1–7
Shafer Yoshimara Suzuki	Suzuki	Suzuki GSX 1000 R	78	(Germany) Stefan Nebel	7
Star Moto	Suzuki	Suzuki GSX 1000 R	77	(France) Olivier Four	All
Suzuki Stefan Schmidt	Suzuki	Suzuki GSX 1000 R	26	(Germany) Christian Nau	All
Five Racing	Yamaha	Yamaha YZF 1000 R1	18	(Italy) Ciro Ranieri	All
Folch Endurance	Yamaha	Yamaha YZF 1000 R1	50	(Spain) Antonio Guinovart	1
GIMotorsport	Yamaha	Yamaha YZF 1000 R1	6	(Italy) Gianluca Vizziello	2–9
GIMotorsport	Yamaha	Yamaha YZF 1000 R1	69	(Italy) Raffaello Fabbroni	1–5
GIMotorsport	Yamaha	Yamaha YZF 1000 R1	70	(Italy) Ilario Dionisi	8
Legs 11	Yamaha	Yamaha YZF 1000 R1	60	(United Kingdom) Kelvin Reilly	3, 6
Lorenzini by Leoni	Yamaha	Yamaha YZF 1000 R1	37	(San Marino) William De Angelis	All
Lorenzini by Leoni	Yamaha	Yamaha YZF 1000 R1	90	(Italy) Lorenzo Mauri	1–4, 6–9
Saveko Racing; Freddy Racing	Yamaha	Yamaha YZF 1000 R1	25	(Sweden) Freddy Papunen	1–5, 7–9
Zone Rouge	Yamaha	Yamaha YZF 1000 R1	20	(Belgium) Geoffrey Naze	1–8

Key
Regular rider
Wildcard rider
Replacement rider

== Championship' standings ==
=== Riders' standings ===
Pos	Rider	Bike	VAL (Spain)	MNZ (Italy)	SIL (United Kingdom)	LAU (Germany)	MIS (San Marino)	BRA (Europe)	OSC (Germany)	ASS (Netherlands)	IMO (Italy)	Pts
1	(Italy) Vittorio Iannuzzo	Suzuki	1^{PF}	1^{PF}	5^{F}	1^{PF}	2^{PF}	DNS^{P}	5	6^{P}	1^{PF}	152
2	(Italy) Walter Tortoroglio	Honda	5	2	4	DNS	6	5	1^{PF}	11	8	103
3	(Italy) Gianluca Vizziello	Yamaha		4	8	2	1	6	EX	4	5	100
4	(United Kingdom) Andy Notman	Suzuki	Ret	13	14	12	7	4	3	2	3	83
5	(Italy) Giacomo Romanelli	Suzuki	2	3	9	Ret	13	7	Ret	9	7	71
6	(Italy) Lorenzo Alfonsi	Ducati	3	DNS	7	3	3	DNS	Ret	5	13	71
7	(Belgium) Koen Vleugels	Suzuki	9	5	15	5	Ret	22	2	13	15	54
8	(United Kingdom) Chris Burns	Suzuki			1^{P}			1^{F}				50
9	(Belgium) Didier Van Keymeulen	Suzuki	15	12	10	9	11	10	7	7	14	49
10	(Italy) Riccardo Chiarello	Ducati	7	DNQ	30	11	Ret	Ret	6	8	6	42
11	(United Kingdom) Steve Brogan	Suzuki			2			DNS		3		36
12	(United Kingdom) Kieran Murphy	Suzuki			3			2				36
13	(Italy) Lorenzo Mauri	Yamaha	12	DNS	13	10		15	9	10	11	32
14	(France) Ludovic Fourreau	Suzuki	6	Ret	12	8	Ret	9				29
15	(Spain) Alex Martinez	Suzuki	8								2	28
16	(Italy) Ilario Dionisi	Aprilia					4					26
16	(Italy) Ilario Dionisi	Yamaha								21		26
16	(Italy) Ilario Dionisi	Suzuki									4	26
17	(Germany) Benjamin Nabert	Suzuki				4	8		11			26
18	(Italy) Alessandro Brannetti	Honda		DNS	23	15	5	12	10	18	12	26
19	(Republic of Ireland) Michael Laverty	Suzuki						NC		1^{F}		25
20	(France) Olivier Four	Suzuki	WD	10	6	Ret	Ret	WD	WD	WD	9	23
21	(United Kingdom) Luke Quigley	Honda	10									22
21	(United Kingdom) Luke Quigley	Suzuki		DNS			WD	8	8	16		22
22	(United Kingdom) Ross McCulloch	Suzuki						3				16
23	(Italy) Marco Tessarolo	Suzuki		7			9				Ret	16
24	(United Kingdom) Simon Andrews	Honda	18	9	11	17	DNS	14	Ret	14		16
25	(San Marino) William De Angelis	Yamaha	19	DNS	28	21	Ret	Ret	12	12	10	14
26	(Spain) Sergio Fuertes	Ducati	4									13
27	(Germany) Stefan Nebel	Suzuki							4			13
28	(Germany) Bjoern Steinmetz	Suzuki				6			13			13
29	(Italy) Fabrizio De Marco	Honda	Ret	6	Ret	Ret	Ret	13	Ret	Ret	Ret	13
30	(Italy) Dario Tosolini	Suzuki	13	DNS	Ret	7	WD	WD	WD			12
31	(Sweden) Freddy Papunen	Yamaha	Ret	8	16	13	Ret		Ret	19	16	11
32	(Italy) Sergio Ruggiero	Ducati	27	14	27	19	10	19	20	22	Ret	8
33	(Netherlands) John Bakker	Ducati	11	Ret	DNS	Ret	16	22		15	23	6
34	(United Kingdom) Dennis Hobbs	Suzuki						11				5
35	(Italy) Raffaelo Fabbroni	Yamaha	20	11	17	16	WD					5
36	(Italy) Ciro Ranieri	Yamaha	23	16	26	Ret	12	Ret	15	23	19	5
37	(Germany) Christian Nau	Suzuki	21	Ret	25	14	18	20	14	Ret	25	4
38	(United Kingdom) Chris Miller	Suzuki	14	DNS								2
39	(Italy) Roberto Lunadei	Aprilia					14				24	2
40	(Netherlands) Robert De Vries	Ducati	17	15	22	18	15	16	DNS	17	21	2
	(Spain) Antonio Guinovart	Yamaha	16									0
	(Germany) Daniel Delling	Suzuki							16			0
	(Belgium) Nicolas Saelens	Ducati	WD	DNQ	24	22	Ret	17	19	Ret	17	0
	(Belgium) Geoffrey Naze	Yamaha	30	17	31	Ret	20	18	Ret	WD		0
	(Italy) Marco Tonini	Aprilia					17				20	0
	(Italy) Enrico Pasini	Aprilia							17		22	0
	(United Kingdom) Kelvin Reilly	Yamaha			18			DNS				0
	(Italy) Christian Dal Corso	Ducati	25	DNS	29	23	Ret	21	18	26	DNS	0
	(Spain) Jose Manuel Hurtado	Aprilia	24									0
	(Spain) Jose Manuel Hurtado	Suzuki									18	0
	(United Kingdom) Kevin Falcke	Suzuki			19							0
	(Republic of Ireland) Declan Swanton	Suzuki	22	WD	20	24	19		WD			0
	(Netherlands) Bob Withag	Suzuki								20		0
	(Czech Republic) Marek Červený	Honda	28	DNS	21	20	WD	Ret	Ret	DNS	26	0
	(Switzerland) Hervé Gantner	Honda							21			0
	(Netherlands) Bertus Folkertsma	Suzuki								24		0
	(Netherlands) Lee Bootsman	Honda								25		0
	(United Kingdom) Matt Layt	Suzuki	26									0
	(Spain) Raul Jacobo	Honda	29									0
	(Netherlands) Ghisbert Van Ginhoven	Ducati								Ret		0
	(Netherlands) Paul Mooijman	Suzuki								Ret		0
	(Germany) Katja Poensgen	Suzuki				DSQ						0
Pos	Rider	Bike	VAL (Spain)	MNZ (Italy)	SIL (United Kingdom)	LAU (Germany)	MIS (San Marino)	BRA (Europe)	OSC (Germany)	ASS (Netherlands)	IMO (Italy)	Pts

Colour	Result
Gold	Winner
Silver	Second place
Bronze	Third place
Green	Points classification
Blue	Non-points classification
Blue	Non-classified finish (NC)
Purple	Retired, not classified (Ret)
Red	Did not qualify (DNQ)
Red	Did not pre-qualify (DNPQ)
Black	Disqualified (DSQ)
White	Did not start (DNS)
White	Withdrew (WD)
White	Race cancelled (C)
Blank	Did not practice (DNP)
Blank	Did not arrive (DNA)
Blank	Excluded (EX)

P – Pole position
F – Fastest lap
Source :
