= 2009 Magny-Cours Superbike World Championship round =

(France) 2009 Magny-Cours Superbike World Championship round
Round details
- Round 13 of 14 rounds in the 2009 Superbike World Championship. and Round 13 of 14 rounds in the 2009 Supersport World Championship.
- Date: October 4, 2009
- Location: Circuit de Nevers Magny-Cours
- Course: Permanent racing facility 4.411 km (2.741 mi)

Superbike World Championship
Pole position
(United States) Ben Spies
1:37.709
Fastest lap race 1	Fastest lap race 2
(Japan) Noriyuki Haga	(United Kingdom) Jonathan Rea
1:38.619	1:38.662

Supersport World Championship
Pole position
(United Kingdom) Cal Crutchlow
1:40.980
Fastest lap
(United Kingdom) Cal Crutchlow
1:41.407

The 2009 Magny-Cours Superbike World Championship round was the thirteenth round of the 2009 Superbike World Championship season. It took place on the weekend of October 2–4, 2009 at the Circuit de Nevers Magny-Cours.

== Results ==
=== Superbike race 1 classification ===
Pos	No	Rider	Manufacturer	Laps	Time	Grid	Points
1	19	(United States) Ben Spies	Yamaha YZF-R1	23	37:57.110	1	25
2	41	(Japan) Noriyuki Haga	Ducati 1098R	23	+0.181	5	20
3	3	(Italy) Max Biaggi	Aprilia RSV 4	23	+5.009	4	16
4	84	(Italy) Michel Fabrizio	Ducati 1098R	23	+16.347	3	13
5	91	(United Kingdom) Leon Haslam	Honda CBR1000RR	23	+22.622	6	11
6	7	(Spain) Carlos Checa	Honda CBR1000RR	23	+24.948	12	10
7	71	(Japan) Yukio Kagayama	Suzuki GSX-R1000 K9	23	+27.144	13	9
8	67	(United Kingdom) Shane Byrne	Ducati 1098R	23	+27.578	9	8
9	11	(Australia) Troy Corser	BMW S1000RR	23	+28.486	8	7
10	96	(Czech Republic) Jakub Smrz	Ducati 1098R	23	+28.716	10	6
11	111	(Spain) Ruben Xaus	BMW S1000RR	23	+52.680	15	5
12	15	(Italy) Matteo Baiocco	Ducati 1098R	23	+1:01.372	18	4
13	99	(Italy) Luca Scassa	Kawasaki ZX-10R	23	+1:05.123	22	3
14	25	(Spain) David Salom	Kawasaki ZX-10R	23	+1:05.483	20	2
15	94	(Spain) David Checa	Yamaha YZF-R1	23	+1:05.672	21	1
16	88	(Austria) Roland Resch	Suzuki GSX-R1000 K9	23	+1:29.284	24	
17	40	(Italy) Flavio Gentile	Honda CBR1000RR	22	+1 Lap	25	
Ret	22	(United Kingdom) Leon Camier	Aprilia RSV 4	20	Mechanical	16	
Ret	132	(South Africa) Sheridan Morais	Kawasaki ZX-10R	13	Retirement	23	
Ret	10	(Spain) Fonsi Nieto	Ducati 1098R	12	Retirement	7	
Ret	23	(Australia) Broc Parkes	Kawasaki ZX-10R	10	Retirement	19	
Ret	65	(United Kingdom) Jonathan Rea	Honda CBR1000RR	8	Retirement	2	
Ret	77	(Italy) Vittorio Iannuzzo	Honda CBR1000RR	5	Retirement	26	
Ret	9	(Japan) Ryuichi Kiyonari	Honda CBR1000RR	3	Accident	17	
Ret	31	(Australia) Karl Muggeridge	Suzuki GSX-R1000 K9	3	Retirement	11	
Ret	66	(United Kingdom) Tom Sykes	Yamaha YZF-R1	1	Accident	14	

=== Superbike race 2 classification ===
Pos	No	Rider	Manufacturer	Laps	Time	Grid	Points
1	41	(Japan) Noriyuki Haga	Ducati 1098R	23	38:00.282	5	25
2	3	(Italy) Max Biaggi	Aprilia RSV 4	23	+1.480	4	20
3	65	(United Kingdom) Jonathan Rea	Honda CBR1000RR	23	+6.024	2	16
4	19	(United States) Ben Spies	Yamaha YZF-R1	23	+18.135	1	13
5	91	(United Kingdom) Leon Haslam	Honda CBR1000RR	23	+21.236	6	11
6	71	(Japan) Yukio Kagayama	Suzuki GSX-R1000 K9	23	+23.647	13	10
7	67	(United Kingdom) Shane Byrne	Ducati 1098R	23	+23.701	9	9
8	31	(Australia) Karl Muggeridge	Suzuki GSX-R1000 K9	23	+24.838	11	8
9	7	(Spain) Carlos Checa	Honda CBR1000RR	23	+31.455	12	7
10	11	(Australia) Troy Corser	BMW S1000RR	23	+32.507	8	6
11	10	(Spain) Fonsi Nieto	Ducati 1098R	23	+37.594	7	5
12	111	(Spain) Ruben Xaus	BMW S1000RR	23	+44.727	15	4
13	84	(Italy) Michel Fabrizio	Ducati 1098R	23	+49.782	3	3
14	15	(Italy) Matteo Baiocco	Ducati 1098R	23	+50.345	18	2
15	23	(Australia) Broc Parkes	Kawasaki ZX-10R	23	+56.209	19	1
16	25	(Spain) David Salom	Kawasaki ZX-10R	23	+58.796	20	
17	94	(Spain) David Checa	Yamaha YZF-R1	23	+1:00.391	21	
18	88	(Austria) Roland Resch	Suzuki GSX-R1000 K9	23	+1:20.777	24	
19	132	(South Africa) Sheridan Morais	Kawasaki ZX-10R	23	+1:24.318	23	
Ret	22	(United Kingdom) Leon Camier	Aprilia RSV 4	15	Retirement	16	
Ret	99	(Italy) Luca Scassa	Kawasaki ZX-10R	14	Retirement	22	
Ret	96	(Czech Republic) Jakub Smrz	Ducati 1098R	13	Retirement	10	
Ret	77	(Italy) Vittorio Iannuzzo	Honda CBR1000RR	12	Retirement	26	
Ret	66	(United Kingdom) Tom Sykes	Yamaha YZF-R1	3	Accident	14	
DNS	9	(Japan) Ryuichi Kiyonari	Honda CBR1000RR		Did not start	17	
DNS	40	(Italy) Flavio Gentile	Honda CBR1000RR		Did not start	25	

=== Supersport race classification ===
The Supersport race was red-flagged during the 20th lap, due to an accident occurred to Michele Pirro. The classification was based on the standings after 19 laps.

Pos	No	Rider	Manufacturer	Laps	Time	Grid	Points
1	26	(Spain) Joan Lascorz	Kawasaki ZX-6R	19	32:21.660	2	25
2	35	(United Kingdom) Cal Crutchlow	Yamaha YZF-R6	19	+0.937	1	20
3	54	(Turkey) Kenan Sofuoğlu	Honda CBR600RR	19	+5.910	3	16
4	13	(Australia) Anthony West	Honda CBR600RR	19	+20.797	16	13
5	8	(Australia) Mark Aitchison	Honda CBR600RR	19	+20.992	8	11
6	1	(Australia) Andrew Pitt	Honda CBR600RR	19	+21.232	9	10
7	21	(Japan) Katsuaki Fujiwara	Kawasaki ZX-6R	19	+21.441	7	9
8	55	(Italy) Massimo Roccoli	Honda CBR600RR	19	+23.539	14	8
9	14	(France) Matthieu Lagrive	Honda CBR600RR	19	+24.654	11	7
10	51	(Italy) Michele Pirro	Yamaha YZF-R6	19	+35.848	5	6
11	199	(France) Olivier Four	Honda CBR600RR	19	+36.243	19	5
12	117	(Portugal) Miguel Praia	Honda CBR600RR	19	+36.803	13	4
13	50	(Republic of Ireland) Eugene Laverty	Honda CBR600RR	19	+52.022	4	3
14	101	(United Kingdom) Kev Coghlan	Yamaha YZF-R6	19	+55.274	21	2
15	28	(Netherlands) Arie Vos	Honda CBR600RR	19	+55.831	18	1
16	82	(France) Julien Enjolras	Triumph Daytona 675	19	+56.277	24	
NC	45	(United Kingdom) Dan Linfoot	Yamaha YZF-R6	19	+55.550	20	
NC	9	(Italy) Danilo Dell'Omo	Honda CBR600RR	19	+56.753	26	
NC	88	(Spain) Yannick Guerra	Yamaha YZF-R6	19	+1:13.676	28	
Ret	77	(Netherlands) Barry Veneman	Honda CBR600RR	19	Retirement	12	
Ret	25	(United Kingdom) Michael Laverty	Honda CBR600RR	18	Retirement	17	
Ret	22	(Romania) Robert Mureșan	Triumph Daytona 675	17	Retirement	23	
Ret	24	(Australia) Garry McCoy	Triumph Daytona 675	13	Retirement	10	
Ret	30	(Germany) Jesco Günther	Honda CBR600RR	13	Retirement	27	
Ret	5	(Indonesia) Doni Tata Pradita	Yamaha YZF-R6	11	Retirement	22	
Ret	99	(France) Fabien Foret	Yamaha YZF-R6	6	Retirement	6	
Ret	61	(France) Fabrice Auger	Yamaha YZF-R6	4	Mechanical	29	
Ret	23	(United Kingdom) Chaz Davies	Triumph Daytona 675	3	Retirement	15	
Ret	16	(United Kingdom) Sam Lowes	Honda CBR600RR	2	Retirement	25	

== Superstock 1000 race ==
Pos.	No.	Rider	Bike	Laps	Time/Retired	Grid	Points
1	21	(France) Maxime Berger	Honda CBR1000RR	14	23:51.110	2	25
2	19	(Belgium) Xavier Simeon	Ducati 1098R	14	+1.560	1	20
3	20	(France) Sylvain Barrier	Yamaha YZF-R1	14	+3.449	4	16
4	71	(Italy) Claudio Corti	Suzuki GSX-R1000 K9	14	+6.677	5	13
5	7	(Austria) René Mähr	Suzuki GSX-R1000 K9	14	+8.591	6	11
6	65	(France) Loris Baz	Yamaha YZF-R1	14	+14.116	10	10
7	112	(Spain) Javier Forés	Kawasaki ZX-10R	14	+14.252	7	9
8	16	(Netherlands) Raymond Schouten	Yamaha YZF-R1	14	+25.881	11	8
9	30	(Switzerland) Michaël Savary	Honda CBR1000RR	14	+26.794	18	7
10	29	(Italy) Daniele Beretta	Ducati 1098R	14	+27.619	16	6
11	34	(Italy) Davide Giugliano	Yamaha YZF-R1	14	+27.709	21	5
12	69	(Czech Republic) Ondřej Ježek	Honda CBR1000RR	14	+28.876	12	4
13	77	(United Kingdom) Barry Burrell	Honda CBR1000RR	14	+30.320	15	3
14	84	(Italy) Fabio Massei	Yamaha YZF-R1	14	+30.651	20	2
15	53	(Germany) Dominic Lammert	Suzuki GSX-R1000 K9	14	+31.683	13	1
16	22	(United Kingdom) Alex Lowes	MV Agusta F4 312 R	14	+34.768	9	
17	39	(France) Julien Millet	Yamaha YZF-R1	14	+36.675	25	
18	93	(France) Mathieu Lussiana	Yamaha YZF-R1	14	+37.140	17	
19	11	(Spain) Pere Tutusaus	KTM RC8 R	14	+37.265	19	
20	111	(Spain) Ismael Ortega	Kawasaki ZX-10R	14	+43.388	14	
21	23	(Italy) Federico Sandi	Aprilia RSV4 Factory	14	+43.510	23	
22	38	(France) Grégory Leblanc	Yamaha YZF-R1	14	+46.490	30	
23	91	(Sweden) Hampus Johansson	Yamaha YZF-R1	14	+46.715	28	
24	61	(France) Franck Millet	Honda CBR1000RR	14	+47.424	27	
25	56	(Slovakia) Tomáš Svitok	MV Agusta F4 312 R	14	+1:02.844	32	
26	64	(Brazil) Danilo Andric	Yamaha YZF-R1	14	+1:09.218	34	
27	12	(Italy) Nico Vivarelli	KTM RC8 R	14	+1:37.248	29	
28	36	(Brazil) Philippe Thiriet	Honda CBR1000RR	13	+1 lap	35	
Ret	81	(Italy) Ayrton Badovini	Aprilia RSV4 Factory	12	Accident	3	
Ret	51	(Spain) Santiago Barragán	Honda CBR1000RR	12	Retirement	22	
Ret	41	(Italy) Lorenzo Baroni	Yamaha YZF-R1	8	Retirement	24	
Ret	26	(Italy) Andrea Liberini	Honda CBR1000RR	8	Retirement	31	
Ret	57	(Norway) Kim Arne Sletten	Yamaha YZF-R1	2	Retirement	33	
Ret	86	(France) Loïc Napoleone	Yamaha YZF-R1	0	Technical problem	26	
Ret	8	(Italy) Andrea Antonelli	Yamaha YZF-R1	0	Accident	8	
WD	131	(Italy) Patrizio Valsecchi	Yamaha YZF-R1		Withdrew		

== Superstock 600 race classification ==
Pos.	No.	Rider	Bike	Laps	Time/Retired	Grid	Points
1	21	(France) Florian Marino	Honda CBR600RR	10	17:43.671	11	25
2	4	(United Kingdom) Gino Rea	Honda CBR600RR	10	+0.251	2	20
3	5	(Italy) Marco Bussolotti	Yamaha YZF-R6	10	+0.429	1	16
4	7	(France) Baptiste Guittet	Honda CBR600RR	10	+0.837	9	13
5	47	(Italy) Eddi La Marra	Honda CBR600RR	10	+0.953	7	11
6	27	(France) Louis Bulle	Yamaha YZF-R6	10	+5.942	12	10
7	19	(Italy) Nico Morelli	Honda CBR600RR	10	+14.016	14	9
8	89	(Austria) Stefan Kerschbaumer	Yamaha YZF-R6	10	+14.368	13	8
9	55	(Belgium) Vincent Lonbois	Yamaha YZF-R6	10	+14.598	5	7
10	39	(France) Randy Pagaud	Honda CBR600RR	10	+15.189	17	6
11	69	(France) Nelson Major	Yamaha YZF-R6	10	+16.245	15	5
12	142	(France) Nans Chevaux	Honda CBR600RR	10	+19.747	10	4
13	36	(Poland) Andrzej Chmielewski	Yamaha YZF-R6	10	+21.026	19	3
14	59	(Denmark) Alex Schacht	Yamaha YZF-R6	10	+23.232	21	2
15	43	(France) Stéphane Egea	Kawasaki ZX-6R	10	+25.377	6	1
16	99	(Czech Republic) Michal Salač	Yamaha YZF-R6	10	+30.064	25	
17	26	(Romania) Mircea Vrăjitoru	Yamaha YZF-R6	10	+31.920	22	
18	9	(Italy) Danilo Petrucci	Yamaha YZF-R6	10	+34.533	8	
19	23	(Switzerland) Christian Von Gunten	Suzuki GSX-R600	10	+35.548	16	
20	12	(Italy) Riccardo Cecchini	Honda CBR600RR	10	+1:03.155	20	
21	30	(Romania) Bogdan Vrăjitoru	Yamaha YZF-R6	10	+1:27.802	24	
Ret	11	(France) Jérémy Guarnoni	Yamaha YZF-R6	9	Accident	4	
Ret	81	(Czech Republic) David Látr	Honda CBR600RR	9	Technical problem	23	
Ret	72	(Norway) Fredrik Karlsen	Yamaha YZF-R6	8	Accident	3	
Ret	17	(Croatia) Luca Nervo	Yamaha YZF-R6	1	Retirement	18	
