= 2009 Portimão Superbike World Championship round =

(Portugal) 2009 Portimão Superbike World Championship round
Round details
- Round 14 of 14 rounds in the 2009 Superbike World Championship. and Round 14 of 14 rounds in the 2009 Supersport World Championship.
- Date: October 25, 2009
- Location: Portimão, Autódromo Internacional do Algarve
- Course: Permanent racing facility 4.592 km (2.853 mi)

Superbike World Championship
Pole position
(United States) Ben Spies
1:42.412
| Fastest lap race 1 | Fastest lap race 2 |
| (Italy) Michel Fabrizio | (Italy) Michel Fabrizio |
| 1:43.529 | 1:43.720 |

Supersport World Championship
Pole position
(Republic of Ireland) Eugene Laverty
1:44.836
Fastest lap
(Spain) Joan Lascorz
1:45.186

The 2009 Portimão Superbike World Championship round was the last round of the 2009 Superbike World Championship. It took place on the weekend of October 23–25, 2009 at the Autódromo Internacional do Algarve.

== Results ==
=== Superbike race 1 classification ===
| Pos | No | Rider | Manufacturer | Laps | Time | Grid | Points |
|---|---|---|---|---|---|---|---|
| 1 | 19 | (United States) Ben Spies | Yamaha YZF-R1 | 22 | 38:15.390 | 1 | 25 |
| 2 | 65 | (United Kingdom) Jonathan Rea | Honda CBR1000RR | 22 | +1.697 | 4 | 20 |
| 3 | 3 | (Italy) Max Biaggi | Aprilia RSV 4 | 22 | +2.113 | 6 | 16 |
| 4 | 67 | (United Kingdom) Shane Byrne | Ducati 1098R | 22 | +2.757 | 2 | 13 |
| 5 | 84 | (Italy) Michel Fabrizio | Ducati 1098R | 22 | +14.753 | 3 | 11 |
| 6 | 22 | (United Kingdom) Leon Camier | Aprilia RSV 4 | 22 | +20.044 | 13 | 10 |
| 7 | 7 | (Spain) Carlos Checa | Honda CBR1000RR | 22 | +25.634 | 12 | 9 |
| 8 | 111 | (Spain) Ruben Xaus | BMW S1000RR | 22 | +31.104 | 19 | 8 |
| 9 | 14 | (France) Matthieu Lagrive | Honda CBR1000RR | 22 | +36.689 | 17 | 7 |
| 10 | 15 | (Italy) Matteo Baiocco | Ducati 1098R | 22 | +39.331 | 16 | 6 |
| 11 | 23 | (Australia) Broc Parkes | Kawasaki ZX-10R | 22 | +41.827 | 18 | 5 |
| 12 | 100 | (Japan) Makoto Tamada | Kawasaki ZX-10R | 22 | +41.882 | 15 | 4 |
| 13 | 25 | (Spain) David Salom | Kawasaki ZX-10R | 22 | +54.967 | 22 | 3 |
| 14 | 94 | (Spain) David Checa | Yamaha YZF-R1 | 22 | +1:38.533 | 24 | 2 |
| 15 | 99 | (Italy) Luca Scassa | Kawasaki ZX-10R | 18 | +4 Laps | 20 | 1 |
| Ret | 88 | (Austria) Roland Resch | Suzuki GSX-R1000 K9 | 19 | Engine | 25 | |
| Ret | 11 | (Australia) Troy Corser | BMW S1000RR | 16 | Retirement | 8 | |
| Ret | 91 | (United Kingdom) Leon Haslam | Honda CBR1000RR | 10 | Accident | 5 | |
| Ret | 96 | (Czech Republic) Jakub Smrž | Ducati 1098R | 8 | Accident | 9 | |
| Ret | 50 | (France) Sylvain Guintoli | Suzuki GSX-R1000 K9 | 8 | Mechanical | 11 | |
| Ret | 77 | (Italy) Vittorio Iannuzzo | Honda CBR1000RR | 7 | Retirement | 23 | |
| Ret | 41 | (Japan) Noriyuki Haga | Ducati 1098R | 6 | Accident | 10 | |
| Ret | 10 | (Spain) Fonsi Nieto | Ducati 1098R | 3 | Mechanical | 7 | |
| Ret | 71 | (Japan) Yukio Kagayama | Suzuki GSX-R1000 K9 | 0 | Accident | 14 | |
| DNS | 66 | (United Kingdom) Tom Sykes | Yamaha YZF-R1 | | Not started | 21 | |
| DNS | 9 | (Japan) Ryuichi Kiyonari | Honda CBR1000RR | | Not started | 26 | |

=== Superbike race 2 classification ===
| Pos | No | Rider | Manufacturer | Laps | Time | Grid | Points |
|---|---|---|---|---|---|---|---|
| 1 | 84 | (Italy) Michel Fabrizio | Ducati 1098R | 22 | 38:19.654 | 3 | 25 |
| 2 | 41 | (Japan) Noriyuki Haga | Ducati 1098R | 22 | +1.195 | 10 | 20 |
| 3 | 65 | (United Kingdom) Jonathan Rea | Honda CBR1000RR | 22 | +1.494 | 4 | 16 |
| 4 | 67 | (United Kingdom) Shane Byrne | Ducati 1098R | 22 | +5.553 | 2 | 13 |
| 5 | 19 | (United States) Ben Spies | Yamaha YZF-R1 | 22 | +5.842 | 1 | 11 |
| 6 | 3 | (Italy) Max Biaggi | Aprilia RSV 4 | 22 | +7.374 | 6 | 10 |
| 7 | 22 | (United Kingdom) Leon Camier | Aprilia RSV 4 | 22 | +9.658 | 13 | 9 |
| 8 | 96 | (Czech Republic) Jakub Smrž | Ducati 1098R | 22 | +10.434 | 9 | 8 |
| 9 | 11 | (Australia) Troy Corser | BMW S1000RR | 22 | +17.010 | 8 | 7 |
| 10 | 50 | (France) Sylvain Guintoli | Suzuki GSX-R1000 K9 | 22 | +24.509 | 11 | 6 |
| 11 | 71 | (Japan) Yukio Kagayama | Suzuki GSX-R1000 K9 | 22 | +27.195 | 14 | 5 |
| 12 | 23 | (Australia) Broc Parkes | Kawasaki ZX-10R | 22 | +34.825 | 18 | 4 |
| 13 | 14 | (France) Matthieu Lagrive | Honda CBR1000RR | 22 | +35.135 | 17 | 3 |
| 14 | 99 | (Italy) Luca Scassa | Kawasaki ZX-10R | 22 | +1:01.842 | 20 | 2 |
| 15 | 94 | (Spain) David Checa | Yamaha YZF-R1 | 22 | +1:09.782 | 24 | 1 |
| 16 | 100 | (Japan) Makoto Tamada | Kawasaki ZX-10R | 22 | +1:30.818 | 15 | |
| 17 | 25 | (Spain) David Salom | Kawasaki ZX-10R | 18 | +4 Laps | 22 | |
| Ret | 15 | (Italy) Matteo Baiocco | Ducati 1098R | 15 | Accident | 16 | |
| Ret | 91 | (United Kingdom) Leon Haslam | Honda CBR1000RR | 8 | Retirement | 5 | |
| Ret | 7 | (Spain) Carlos Checa | Honda CBR1000RR | 7 | Mechanical | 12 | |
| Ret | 111 | (Spain) Ruben Xaus | BMW S1000RR | 7 | Accident | 19 | |
| Ret | 10 | (Spain) Fonsi Nieto | Ducati 1098R | 7 | Retirement | 7 | |
| Ret | 77 | (Italy) Vittorio Iannuzzo | Honda CBR1000RR | 3 | Mechanical | 23 | |
| DNS | 88 | (Austria) Roland Resch | Suzuki GSX-R1000 K9 | | Not started | 25 | |
| DNS | 66 | (United Kingdom) Tom Sykes | Yamaha YZF-R1 | | Not started | 21 | |
| DNS | 9 | (Japan) Ryuichi Kiyonari | Honda CBR1000RR | | Not started | 26 | |

=== Supersport race classification ===
| Pos | No | Rider | Manufacturer | Laps | Time | Grid | Points |
|---|---|---|---|---|---|---|---|
| 1 | 50 | (Republic of Ireland) Eugene Laverty | Honda CBR600RR | 20 | 35:17.044 | 1 | 25 |
| 2 | 54 | (Turkey) Kenan Sofuoğlu | Honda CBR600RR | 20 | +3.443 | 4 | 20 |
| 3 | 24 | (Australia) Garry McCoy | Triumph Daytona 675 | 20 | +13.874 | 6 | 16 |
| 4 | 35 | (United Kingdom) Cal Crutchlow | Yamaha YZF-R6 | 20 | +15.144 | 2 | 13 |
| 5 | 8 | (Australia) Mark Aitchison | Honda CBR600RR | 20 | +16.608 | 9 | 11 |
| 6 | 51 | (Italy) Michele Pirro | Yamaha YZF-R6 | 20 | +20.008 | 3 | 10 |
| 7 | 23 | (United Kingdom) Chaz Davies | Triumph Daytona 675 | 20 | +22.007 | 14 | 9 |
| 8 | 99 | (France) Fabien Foret | Yamaha YZF-R6 | 20 | +22.034 | 8 | 8 |
| 9 | 77 | (Netherlands) Barry Veneman | Honda CBR600RR | 20 | +23.031 | 10 | 7 |
| 10 | 117 | (Portugal) Miguel Praia | Honda CBR600RR | 20 | +24.002 | 7 | 6 |
| 11 | 1 | (Australia) Andrew Pitt | Honda CBR600RR | 20 | +31.794 | 11 | 5 |
| 12 | 36 | (Colombia) Martín Cárdenas | Honda CBR600RR | 20 | +31.811 | 15 | 4 |
| 13 | 21 | (Japan) Katsuaki Fujiwara | Kawasaki ZX-6R | 20 | +32.218 | 12 | 3 |
| 14 | 25 | (United Kingdom) Michael Laverty | Honda CBR600RR | 20 | +33.196 | 16 | 2 |
| 15 | 101 | (United Kingdom) Kev Coghlan | Yamaha YZF-R6 | 20 | +1:02.386 | 18 | 1 |
| 16 | 5 | (Indonesia) Doni Tata Pradita | Yamaha YZF-R6 | 20 | +1:06.401 | 20 | |
| 17 | 9 | (Italy) Danilo dell'Omo | Honda CBR600RR | 20 | +1:08.010 | 21 | |
| 18 | 88 | (Spain) Yannick Guerra | Yamaha YZF-R6 | 20 | +1:18.977 | 23 | |
| 19 | 40 | (Italy) Flavio Gentile | Honda CBR600RR | 20 | +1:19.080 | 24 | |
| 20 | 199 | (France) Olivier Four | Honda CBR600RR | 20 | +1:22.144 | 19 | |
| 21 | 22 | (Romania) Robert Muresan | Triumph Daytona 675 | 20 | +2:06.258 | 26 | |
| 22 | 122 | (Poland) Marcin Walkowiak | Yamaha YZF-R6 | 19 | +1 Lap | 25 | |
| Ret | 55 | (Italy) Massimo Roccoli | Honda CBR600RR | 16 | Accident | 13 | |
| Ret | 28 | (Netherlands) Arie Vos | Honda CBR600RR | 15 | Retirement | 22 | |
| Ret | 16 | (United Kingdom) Sam Lowes | Honda CBR600RR | 7 | Retirement | 17 | |
| Ret | 26 | (Spain) Joan Lascorz | Kawasaki ZX-6R | 3 | Mechanical | 5 | |

== Superstock 1000 race classification ==
| Pos. | No. | Rider | Bike | Laps | Time/Retired | Grid | Points |
|---|---|---|---|---|---|---|---|
| 1 | 19 | (Belgium) Xavier Simeon | Ducati 1098R | 12 | 21:26.494 | 2 | 25 |
| 2 | 71 | (Italy) Claudio Corti | Suzuki GSX-R1000 K9 | 12 | +3.594 | 5 | 20 |
| 3 | 112 | (Spain) Javier Forés | Kawasaki ZX-10R | 12 | +4.566 | 6 | 16 |
| 4 | 7 | (Austria) René Mähr | Suzuki GSX-R1000 K9 | 12 | +4.779 | 3 | 13 |
| 5 | 21 | (France) Maxime Berger | Honda CBR1000RR | 12 | +11.496 | 1 | 11 |
| 6 | 65 | (France) Loris Baz | Yamaha YZF-R1 | 12 | +12.115 | 7 | 10 |
| 7 | 20 | (France) Sylvain Barrier | Yamaha YZF-R1 | 12 | +12.166 | 4 | 9 |
| 8 | 69 | (Czech Republic) Ondřej Ježek | Honda CBR1000RR | 12 | +16.196 | 9 | 8 |
| 9 | 53 | (Germany) Dominic Lammert | Suzuki GSX-R1000 K9 | 12 | +17.816 | 8 | 7 |
| 10 | 51 | (Spain) Santiago Barragán | Honda CBR1000RR | 12 | +19.824 | 10 | 6 |
| 11 | 84 | (Italy) Fabio Massei | Yamaha YZF-R1 | 12 | +20.050 | 13 | 5 |
| 12 | 8 | (Italy) Andrea Antonelli | Yamaha YZF-R1 | 12 | +21.540 | 12 | 4 |
| 13 | 23 | (Italy) Federico Sandi | Aprilia RSV4 Factory | 12 | +21.619 | 18 | 3 |
| 14 | 117 | (Italy) Denis Sacchetti | Honda CBR1000RR | 12 | +23.857 | 19 | 2 |
| 15 | 77 | (United Kingdom) Barry Burrell | Honda CBR1000RR | 12 | +27.254 | 20 | 1 |
| 16 | 91 | (Sweden) Hampus Johansson | Yamaha YZF-R1 | 12 | +27.320 | 17 | |
| 17 | 41 | (Italy) Lorenzo Baroni | Yamaha YZF-R1 | 12 | +29.324 | 14 | |
| 18 | 11 | (Spain) Pere Tutusaus | KTM RC8 R | 12 | +33.926 | 22 | |
| 19 | 111 | (Spain) Ismael Ortega | Kawasaki ZX-10R | 12 | +39.553 | 30 | |
| 20 | 72 | (France) Nicolas Pouhair | Yamaha YZF-R1 | 12 | +39.974 | 21 | |
| 21 | 12 | (Italy) Nico Vivarelli | KTM RC8 R | 12 | +46.035 | 23 | |
| 22 | 99 | (South Africa) Chris Leeson | Kawasaki ZX-10R | 12 | +46.071 | 36 | |
| 23 | 39 | (France) Julien Millet | Yamaha YZF-R1 | 12 | +47.885 | 29 | |
| 24 | 88 | (Slovakia) Jaroslav Černý | Yamaha YZF-R1 | 12 | +48.227 | 27 | |
| 25 | 55 | (Portugal) Tiago Dias | Yamaha YZF-R1 | 12 | +59.402 | 31 | |
| 26 | 14 | (Italy) Federico Biaggi | Aprilia RSV4 Factory | 12 | +59.624 | 33 | |
| 27 | 36 | (Brazil) Philippe Thiriet | Honda CBR1000RR | 12 | +1:02.689 | 35 | |
| Ret | 86 | (France) Loïc Napoleone | Yamaha YZF-R1 | 11 | Retirement | 15 | |
| Ret | 93 | (France) Mathieu Lussiana | Yamaha YZF-R1 | 9 | Retirement | 26 | |
| Ret | 64 | (Brazil) Danilo Andric | Yamaha YZF-R1 | 6 | Retirement | 32 | |
| Ret | 29 | (Italy) Daniele Beretta | Ducati 1098R | 5 | Retirement | 11 | |
| Ret | 191 | (Slovakia) Tomáš Krajčí | Honda CBR1000RR | 4 | Accident | 24 | |
| Ret | 26 | (Italy) Andrea Liberini | Honda CBR1000RR | 2 | Accident | 28 | |
| Ret | 57 | (Norway) Kim Arne Sletten | Yamaha YZF-R1 | 1 | Retirement | 25 | |
| Ret | 30 | (Switzerland) Michaël Savary | Honda CBR1000RR | 0 | Accident | 34 | |
| DNS | 16 | (Netherlands) Raymond Schouten | Yamaha YZF-R1 | 0 | Did not start | 16 | |

== Superstock 600 race classification ==
| Pos. | No. | Rider | Bike | Laps | Time/Retired | Grid | Points |
|---|---|---|---|---|---|---|---|
| 1 | 5 | (Italy) Marco Bussolotti | Yamaha YZF-R6 | 10 | 18:07.948 | 2 | 25 |
| 2 | 55 | (Belgium) Vincent Lonbois | Yamaha YZF-R6 | 10 | +0.455 | 3 | 20 |
| 3 | 4 | (United Kingdom) Gino Rea | Honda CBR600RR | 10 | +0.507 | 8 | 16 |
| 4 | 72 | (Norway) Fredrik Karlsen | Yamaha YZF-R6 | 10 | +12.942 | 4 | 13 |
| 5 | 9 | (Italy) Danilo Petrucci | Yamaha YZF-R6 | 10 | +13.069 | 9 | 11 |
| 6 | 11 | (France) Jérémy Guarnoni | Yamaha YZF-R6 | 10 | +13.304 | 6 | 10 |
| 7 | 21 | (France) Florian Marino | Honda CBR600RR | 10 | +13.314 | 7 | 9 |
| 8 | 19 | (Italy) Nico Morelli | Honda CBR600RR | 10 | +13.630 | 5 | 8 |
| 9 | 7 | (France) Baptiste Guittet | Honda CBR600RR | 10 | +13.662 | 10 | 7 |
| 10 | 89 | (Austria) Stefan Kerschbaumer | Yamaha YZF-R6 | 10 | +14.023 | 11 | 6 |
| 11 | 117 | (Portugal) André Carvalho | Yamaha YZF-R6 | 10 | +30.852 | 16 | 5 |
| 12 | 12 | (Italy) Riccardo Cecchini | Honda CBR600RR | 10 | +34.158 | 15 | 4 |
| 13 | 36 | (Poland) Andrzej Chmielewski | Yamaha YZF-R6 | 10 | +34.915 | 18 | 3 |
| 14 | 10 | (Spain) Nacho Calero | Yamaha YZF-R6 | 10 | +37.256 | 12 | 2 |
| 15 | 41 | (Portugal) Sérgio Batista | Kawasaki ZX-6R | 10 | +37.272 | 21 | 1 |
| 16 | 99 | (Czech Republic) Michal Salač | Yamaha YZF-R6 | 10 | +39.896 | 17 | |
| 17 | 32 | (Germany) Marc Moser | Triumph Daytona 675 | 10 | +40.113 | 13 | |
| 18 | 6 | (France) Jonathan Martinez | Honda CBR600RR | 10 | +40.114 | 19 | |
| 19 | 26 | (Romania) Mircea Vrăjitoru | Yamaha YZF-R6 | 10 | +41.764 | 26 | |
| 20 | 14 | (Spain) Jaume Ferrer | Kawasaki ZX-6R | 10 | +47.396 | 20 | |
| 21 | 82 | (Czech Republic) Karel Pešek | Honda CBR600RR | 10 | +53.381 | 25 | |
| 22 | 81 | (Czech Republic) David Látr | Honda CBR600RR | 10 | +54.455 | 22 | |
| 23 | 39 | (France) Randy Pagaud | Honda CBR600RR | 10 | +55.312 | 24 | |
| 24 | 15 | (Spain) Ivan Romero | Honda CBR600RR | 10 | +1:01.999 | 23 | |
| 25 | 17 | (Croatia) Luca Nervo | Yamaha YZF-R6 | 10 | +1:17.349 | 27 | |
| 26 | 30 | (Romania) Bogdan Vrăjitoru | Yamaha YZF-R6 | 10 | +1:40.010 | 28 | |
| Ret | 23 | (Switzerland) Christian Von Gunten | Suzuki GSX-R600 | 9 | Accident | 14 | |
| Ret | 47 | (Italy) Eddi La Marra | Honda CBR600RR | 0 | Accident | 1 | |
