= 2007 Vallelunga Superbike World Championship round =

(Italy) 2007 Italian Superbike World Championship round
Round details
- Round 12 of 13 rounds in the 2007 Superbike World Championship. and Round 12 of 13 rounds in the 2007 Supersport World Championship.
- Date: September 30, 2007
- Location: ACI Vallelunga Circuit
- Course: Permanent racing facility 4.085 km (2.538 mi)

Superbike World Championship
Pole position
(Australia) Troy Bayliss
1'35.890
Fastest lap race 1	Fastest lap race 2
(Japan) Noriyuki Haga	(Italy) Max Biaggi
1'37.419	1'37.727

Supersport World Championship
Pole position
(United Kingdom) Craig Jones
1'39.322
Fastest lap
(Turkey) Kenan Sofuoğlu
1'40.231

== Superbike race 1 classification ==
Pos	No	Rider	Bike	Laps	Time	Grid	Points
1	3	(Italy) Max Biaggi	Suzuki GSX-R1000 K7	24	39:24.967	4	25
2	21	(Australia) Troy Bayliss	Ducati 999 F07	24	+5.638	1	20
3	52	(United Kingdom) James Toseland	Honda CBR1000RR	24	+7.452	8	16
4	41	(Japan) Noriyuki Haga	Yamaha YZF-R1	24	+10.079	5	13
5	84	(Italy) Michel Fabrizio	Honda CBR1000RR	24	+22.257	7	11
6	57	(Italy) Lorenzo Lanzi	Ducati 999 F07	24	+25.662	6	10
7	55	(France) Régis Laconi	Kawasaki ZX-10R	24	+34.811	13	9
8	10	(Spain) Fonsi Nieto	Kawasaki ZX-10R	24	+38.075	16	8
9	38	(Japan) Shinichi Nakatomi	Yamaha YZF-R1	24	+39.070	10	7
10	13	(Italy) Vittorio Iannuzzo	Kawasaki ZX-10R	24	+47.702	15	6
11	96	(Czech Republic) Jakub Smrž	Ducati 999 F05	24	+47.806	14	5
12	20	(Italy) Marco Borciani	Ducati 999 F06	24	+53.488	11	4
13	31	(Australia) Karl Muggeridge	Honda CBR1000RR	24	+54.509	17	3
14	99	(Australia) Steve Martin	Suzuki GSX-R1000 K6	24	+1:01.967	22	2
15	32	(France) Yoann Tiberio	Honda CBR1000RR	24	+1:08.291	18	1
16	22	(Italy) Luca Morelli	Honda CBR1000RR	24	+1:08.517	21	
17	42	(United Kingdom) Dean Ellison	Ducati 999RS	23	+1 Lap	23	
Ret	111	(Spain) Ruben Xaus	Ducati 999 F06	9	Retirement	3	
Ret	117	(Italy) Norino Brignola	Ducati 999 F05	3	Retirement	19	
Ret	76	(Germany) Max Neukirchner	Suzuki GSX-R1000 K6	0	Retirement	12	
Ret	11	(Australia) Troy Corser	Yamaha YZF-R1	0	Retirement	2	
Ret	44	(Italy) Roberto Rolfo	Honda CBR1000RR	0	Retirement	9	

== Superbike race 2 classification ==
Pos	No	Rider	Bike	Laps	Time	Grid	Points
1	21	(Australia) Troy Bayliss	Ducati 999 F07	24	39:30.861	1	25
2	3	(Italy) Max Biaggi	Suzuki GSX-R1000 K7	24	+1.431	4	20
3	41	(Japan) Noriyuki Haga	Yamaha YZF-R1	24	+4.466	5	16
4	11	(Australia) Troy Corser	Yamaha YZF-R1	24	+13.766	2	13
5	44	(Italy) Roberto Rolfo	Honda CBR1000RR	24	+20.848	9	11
6	111	(Spain) Ruben Xaus	Ducati 999 F06	24	+21.930	3	10
7	57	(Italy) Lorenzo Lanzi	Ducati 999 F07	24	+29.847	6	9
8	10	(Spain) Fonsi Nieto	Kawasaki ZX-10R	24	+29.986	16	8
9	38	(Japan) Shinichi Nakatomi	Yamaha YZF-R1	24	+40.126	10	7
10	76	(Germany) Max Neukirchner	Suzuki GSX-R1000 K6	24	+40.733	12	6
11	52	(United Kingdom) James Toseland	Honda CBR1000RR	24	+42.544	8	5
12	13	(Italy) Vittorio Iannuzzo	Kawasaki ZX-10R	24	+54.504	15	4
13	31	(Australia) Karl Muggeridge	Honda CBR1000RR	24	+55.024	17	3
14	99	(Australia) Steve Martin	Suzuki GSX-R1000 K6	24	+55.304	22	2
15	32	(France) Yoann Tiberio	Honda CBR1000RR	24	+59.781	18	1
16	117	(Italy) Norino Brignola	Ducati 999 F05	24	+1:00.609	19	
17	22	(Italy) Luca Morelli	Honda CBR1000RR	24	+1:06.922	21	
18	20	(Italy) Marco Borciani	Ducati 999 F06	24	+1:18.228	11	
19	42	(United Kingdom) Dean Ellison	Ducati 999RS	23	+1 Lap	23	
Ret	55	(France) Régis Laconi	Kawasaki ZX-10R	12	Retirement	13	
Ret	84	(Italy) Michel Fabrizio	Honda CBR1000RR	8	Retirement	7	
Ret	96	(Czech Republic) Jakub Smrž	Ducati 999 F05	1	Retirement	14	

== Supersport race classification ==
Pos	No	Rider	Bike	Laps	Time	Grid	Points
1	54	(Turkey) Kenan Sofuoğlu	Honda CBR600RR	17	28:42.956	3	25
2	18	(United Kingdom) Craig Jones	Honda CBR600RR	17	+0.181	1	20
3	26	(Spain) Joan Lascorz	Honda CBR600RR	17	+5.822	6	16
4	23	(Australia) Broc Parkes	Yamaha YZF-R6	17	+7.063	5	13
5	45	(Italy) Gianluca Vizziello	Yamaha YZF-R6	17	+15.412	4	11
6	81	(France) Matthieu Lagrive	Honda CBR600RR	17	+17.246	18	10
7	111	(Germany) Arne Tode	Honda CBR600RR	17	+18.062	9	9
8	116	(Italy) Simone Sanna	Honda CBR600RR	17	+18.565	26	8
9	16	(France) Sébastien Charpentier	Honda CBR600RR	17	+20.676	2	7
10	21	(Japan) Katsuaki Fujiwara	Honda CBR600RR	17	+20.909	14	6
11	181	(United Kingdom) Graeme Gowland	Honda CBR600RR	17	+24.514	23	5
12	31	(Finland) Vesa Kallio	Suzuki GSX-R600	17	+25.772	16	4
13	194	(France) Sébastien Gimbert	Yamaha YZF-R6	17	+26.529	13	3
14	9	(France) Fabien Foret	Kawasaki ZX-6R	17	+26.643	19	2
15	94	(Spain) David Checa	Yamaha YZF-R6	17	+26.999	17	1
16	33	(Germany) Stefan Nebel	Kawasaki ZX-6R	17	+37.511	24	
17	51	(Italy) Alessio Corradi	Ducati 749R	17	+38.400	31	
18	35	(Italy) Gilles Boccolini	Kawasaki ZX-6R	17	+38.789	29	
19	60	(Russia) Vladimir Ivanov	Yamaha YZF-R6	17	+39.765	28	
20	10	(Spain) Arturo Tizón	Yamaha YZF-R6	17	+43.005	30	
21	79	(Czech Republic) Michal Filla	Honda CBR600RR	17	+1:06.416	32	
Ret	12	(Spain) Javier Forés	Honda CBR600RR	16	Accident	15	
Ret	4	(Italy) Lorenzo Alfonsi	Honda CBR600RR	16	Accident	11	
Ret	38	(France) Grégory Leblanc	Honda CBR600RR	16	Accident	20	
Ret	112	(Italy) Stefano Cruciani	Honda CBR600RR	15	Accident	25	
Ret	7	(Spain) Pere Riba	Kawasaki ZX-6R	9	Retirement	22	
Ret	125	(Australia) Josh Brookes	Honda CBR600RR	8	Retirement	7	
Ret	77	(Netherlands) Barry Veneman	Suzuki GSX-R600	8	Retirement	21	
Ret	17	(Portugal) Miguel Praia	Honda CBR600RR	7	Retirement	27	
Ret	169	(France) Julien Enjolras	Yamaha YZF-R6	6	Retirement	33	
Ret	44	(Spain) David Salom	Yamaha YZF-R6	5	Accident	8	
Ret	55	(Italy) Massimo Roccoli	Yamaha YZF-R6	4	Retirement	10	
Ret	6	(United Kingdom) Tommy Hill	Yamaha YZF-R6	0	Accident	12	
DNS	69	(Italy) Gianluca Nannelli	Ducati 749R		Did not start		

== Superstock 1000 race classification ==
Pos	No	Rider	Bike	Laps	Time	Grid	Points
1	71	(Italy) Claudio Corti	Yamaha YZF-R1	13	22:08.540	2	25
2	59	(Italy) Niccolò Canepa	Ducati 1098S	13	+0.817	1	20
3	86	(Italy) Ayrton Badovini	MV Agusta F4 312 R	13	+2.884	7	16
4	155	(Australia) Brendan Roberts	Ducati 1098S	13	+4.678	6	13
5	19	(Belgium) Xavier Simeon	Suzuki GSX-R1000 K6	13	+7.058	3	11
6	15	(Italy) Matteo Baiocco	Yamaha YZF-R1	13	+8.232	9	10
7	57	(Italy) Ilario Dionisi	Suzuki GSX-R1000 K6	13	+8.502	4	9
8	51	(Italy) Michele Pirro	Yamaha YZF-R1	13	+13.352	8	8
9	78	(France) Freddy Foray	Yamaha YZF-R1	13	+14.351	12	7
10	44	(Austria) René Mähr	Yamaha YZF-R1	13	+15.598	11	6
11	83	(Belgium) Didier Van Keymeulen	Yamaha YZF-R1	13	+15.884	10	5
12	66	(Italy) Luca Verdini	Yamaha YZF-R1	13	+22.010	16	4
13	56	(Switzerland) Daniel Sutter	Yamaha YZF-R1	13	+23.933	22	3
14	25	(Germany) Dario Giuseppetti	Yamaha YZF-R1	13	+24.169	18	2
15	34	(Hungary) Balázs Németh	Suzuki GSX-R1000 K6	13	+27.124	21	1
16	33	(Estonia) Marko Rohtlaan	Honda CBR1000RR	13	+27.219	23	
17	82	(Italy) Giacomo Romanelli	Ducati 1098S	13	+28.153	17	
18	72	(United Kingdom) Adam Jenkinson	Suzuki GSX-R1000 K6	13	+34.115	19	
19	88	(Germany) Timo Gieseler	Yamaha YZF-R1	13	+39.395	27	
20	38	(Spain) Manuel Hernández	Yamaha YZF-R1	13	+39.870	24	
21	16	(Netherlands) Raymond Schouten	Yamaha YZF-R1	13	+41.252	15	
22	18	(United Kingdom) Matt Bond	Suzuki GSX-R1000 K6	13	+41.672	31	
23	13	(Hungary) Victor Kispataki	Suzuki GSX-R1000 K6	13	+46.049	33	
24	10	(France) Franck Millet	MV Agusta F4 312 R	13	+48.936	34	
25	24	(Slovenia) Marko Jerman	Yamaha YZF-R1	13	+51.793	36	
26	21	(Belgium) Wim Van Den Broeck	Yamaha YZF-R1	13	+55.286	37	
27	3	(Australia) Mark Aitchison	Suzuki GSX-R1000 K6	13	+1:00.043	5	
Ret	75	(Slovenia) Luka Nedog	Ducati 1098S	11	Retirement	29	
Ret	32	(South Africa) Sheridan Morais	Ducati 1098S	9	Technical problem	20	
Ret	96	(Czech Republic) Matěj Smrž	Honda CBR1000RR	9	Accident	14	
Ret	37	(Italy) Raffaele Filice	Suzuki GSX-R1000 K6	8	Retirement	32	
Ret	134	(South Africa) Greg Gildenhuys	Ducati 1098S	6	Accident	30	
Ret	5	(Netherlands) Bram Appelo	Honda CBR1000RR	6	Accident	35	
Ret	58	(Italy) Robert Gianfardoni	Yamaha YZF-R1	4	Retirement	39	
Ret	99	(Italy) Danilo Dell'Omo	MV Agusta F4 312 R	2	Technical problem	13	
Ret	77	(United Kingdom) Barry Burrell	Honda CBR1000RR	2	Retirement	25	
Ret	11	(Italy) Denis Sacchetti	MV Agusta F4 312 R	2	Retirement	28	
Ret	14	(Italy) Lorenzo Baroni	Ducati 1098S	2	Retirement	26	
Ret	29	(Italy) Niccolò Rosso	MV Agusta F4 312 R	2	Retirement	38	
DNS	42	(Germany) Leonardo Biliotti	MV Agusta F4 312 R		Did not start		

=== STK600 race classification ===
Pos.	No.	Rider	Bike	Laps	Time/Retired	Grid	Points
1	99	(Netherlands) Roy Ten Napel	Yamaha YZF-R6	10	17:20.455	2	25
2	8	(Italy) Andrea Antonelli	Honda CBR600RR	10	+0.879	6	20
3	21	(France) Maxime Berger	Yamaha YZF-R6	10	+1.627	1	16
4	24	(Italy) Daniele Beretta	Suzuki GSX-R600	10	+4.889	5	13
5	119	(Italy) Michele Magnoni	Yamaha YZF-R6	10	+4.995	10	11
6	29	(Italy) Marco Bussolotti	Yamaha YZF-R6	10	+5.065	4	10
7	20	(France) Sylvain Barrier	Yamaha YZF-R6	10	+12.362	13	9
8	32	(Italy) Danilo Petrucci	Yamaha YZF-R6	10	+12.677	7	8
9	199	(United Kingdom) Gregg Black	Yamaha YZF-R6	10	+13.041	8	7
10	55	(Belgium) Vincent Lonbois	Suzuki GSX-R600	10	+13.243	15	6
11	30	(Switzerland) Michaël Savary	Yamaha YZF-R6	10	+13.760	19	5
12	4	(France) Mathieu Gines	Yamaha YZF-R6	10	+13.791	11	4
13	111	(Czech Republic) Michal Šembera	Honda CBR600RR	10	+16.821	12	3
14	51	(Italy) Nico Morelli	Yamaha YZF-R6	10	+17.087	18	2
15	81	(Czech Republic) Patrik Vostárek	Honda CBR600RR	10	+18.205	21	1
16	69	(Czech Republic) Ondřej Ježek	Kawasaki ZX-6R	10	+19.713	14	
17	28	(Spain) Yannick Guerra	Yamaha YZF-R6	10	+19.973	17	
18	43	(Italy) Daniele Rossi	Honda CBR600RR	10	+20.297	9	
19	7	(Italy) Renato Costantini	Honda CBR600RR	10	+25.607	16	
20	22	(Italy) Gabriele Poma	Yamaha YZF-R6	10	+26.863	24	
21	112	(Spain) Josep Pedró	Yamaha YZF-R6	10	+27.120	23	
22	47	(Italy) Eddi La Marra	Honda CBR600RR	10	+28.002	20	
23	48	(Russia) Vladimir Leonov	Yamaha YZF-R6	10	+29.615	28	
24	44	(United Kingdom) Gino Rea	Suzuki GSX-R600	10	+30.699	26	
25	34	(United Kingdom) Jay Dunn	Honda CBR600RR	10	+31.426	25	
26	18	(Austria) Stefan Kerschbaumer	Honda CBR600RR	10	+31.694	22	
27	57	(Denmark) Kenny Tirsgaard	Suzuki GSX-R600	10	+35.655	27	
28	10	(United Kingdom) Leon Hunt	Honda CBR600RR	10	+43.659	29	
29	114	(Belgium) Nicolas Pirot	Yamaha YZF-R6	10	+55.527	30	
30	25	(Australia) Ryan Taylor	Kawasaki ZX-6R	10	+1:22.608	32	
Ret	66	(Netherlands) Branko Srdanov	Yamaha YZF-R6	8	Retirement	33	
Ret	37	(Italy) Giuliano Gregorini	Yamaha YZF-R6	6	Retirement	3	
Ret	12	(Italy) Andrea Boscoscuro	Kawasaki ZX-6R	1	Accident	31	
WD	35	(Bulgaria) Radostin Todorov	Yamaha YZF-R6		Withdrew		
