= 2007 FIM Superstock 1000 Cup =

2007 FIM Superstock 1000 Cup
Previous:	2006	Next:	2008
Support series: Superbike World Championship; Supersport World Championship; European Superstock 600 Championship

The 2007 FIM Superstock 1000 Cup was the ninth season of the FIM Superstock 1000 championship, the third held under this name. The FIM Superstock 1000 championship followed the same calendar as the Superbike World Championship, missing out the none European rounds of the championship.

Italian Niccolò Canepa won the title after beating closest title rival Claudio Corti.

== Race calendar and results ==
Round	Date	Round	Circuit	Pole position	Fastest lap	Race winner	Winning team
1	1 April	Europe	Donington Park	(Italy) Michele Pirro	(Italy) Michele Pirro	(Italy) Niccolò Canepa	Ducati Xerox junior Team
2	15 April	Spain	Valencia	(Italy) Ayrton Badovini	(Italy) Claudio Corti	(Australia) Mark Aitchison	Celani Team Suzuki Italia
3	29 April	Netherlands	Assen	(Italy) Claudio Corti	(Belgium) Didier Van Keymeulen	(Italy) Michele Pirro	Yamaha Team Italia
4	13 May	Italy	Monza	(Italy) Michele Pirro	(Australia) Mark Aitchison	(Italy) Matteo Baiocco	Umbria Bike
5	27 May	(United Kingdom) Great Britain	Silverstone	(Italy) Michele Pirro	(Czech Republic) Matěj Smrž	(Australia) Brendan Roberts	Ducati Xerox Junior Team
6	17 June	San Marino	Misano	(Italy) Matteo Baiocco	(Belgium) Xavier Simeon	(Italy) Matteo Baiocco	Umbria Bike
7	22 July	Czech Republic	Brno	(Italy) Niccolò Canepa	(Italy) Claudio Corti	(Belgium) Xavier Simeon	Alstare Suzuki Corona Extra
8	5 August	(United Kingdom) Great Britain	Brands Hatch	(Italy) Claudio Corti	(Australia) Mark Aitchison	(Italy) Niccolò Canepa	Ducati Xerox Junior Team
9	9 September	Germany	Lausitzring	(Italy) Niccolò Canepa	(Australia) Mark Aitchison	(Belgium) Didier Van Keymeulen	TTSL-MGM Racing
10	30 September	Italy	Vallelunga	(Italy) Niccolò Canepa	(Italy) Niccolò Canepa	(Italy) Claudio Corti	Yamaha Team Italia
11	7 October	France	Magny-Cours	(Italy) Niccolò Canepa	(Italy) Ayrton Badovini	(Italy) Ayrton Badovini	Biassono Racing Team

== Entry list ==
Entry List
Team	Constructor	Motorcycle	No.	Rider	Rounds
Ducati Xerox Junior Team	Ducati	Ducati 1098S	59	(Italy) Niccolò Canepa	All
Ducati Xerox Junior Team	Ducati	Ducati 1098S	155	(Australia) Brendan Roberts	2–11
RD Motoracing	Ducati	Ducati 1098S	82	(Italy) Giacomo Romanelli	10
Team Ducati SC Caracchi	Ducati	Ducati 1098S	75	(Slovenia) Luka Nedog	All
Team Pedercini	Ducati	Ducati 1098S	28	(United States) Nicky Moore	1–4
Team Pedercini	Ducati	Ducati 1098S	32	(South Africa) Sheridan Morais	All
Team Pedercini	Ducati	Ducati 1098S	134	(South Africa) Greg Gildenhuys	6–11
Team Sterilgarda	Ducati	Ducati 1098S	14	(Italy) Lorenzo Baroni	1–6, 9–11
Team Sterilgarda	Ducati	Ducati 1098S	29	(Italy) Niccolò Rosso	1–6
Azione Corse	Honda	Honda CBR1000RR	33	(Estonia) Marko Rohtlaan	All
EAB Ten Kate Honda	Honda	Honda CBR1000RR	5	(Netherlands) Bram Appelo	1–4, 7–10
EAB Ten Kate Honda	Honda	Honda CBR1000RR	92	(Netherlands) Ronald Ter Braake	5–6
Emmebi Team	Honda	Honda CBR1000RR	43	(Italy) Enrico Sirch	6
MS Racing	Honda	Honda CBR1000RR	77	(United Kingdom) Barry Burrell	All
MS Racing	Honda	Honda CBR1000RR	96	(Czech Republic) Matěj Smrž	All
Racing Dirk Van Mol	Honda	Honda CBR1000RR	49	(Germany) Arne Tode	1–9
Team PMS Kawasaki Supported	Kawasaki	Kawasaki ZX 10R	53	(Italy) Tommaso Lorenzetti	4
Ter Braake Kawasaki	Kawasaki	Kawasaki ZX 10R	92	(Netherlands) Ronald Ter Braake	3
Biassono UnionBike	MV Agusta	MV Agusta F4 1000 R	10	(France) Franck Millet	All
Biassono UnionBike	MV Agusta	MV Agusta F4 1000 R	86	(Italy) Ayrton Badovini	All
EVR Corse	MV Agusta	MV Agusta F4 1000 R	4	(France) Loïc Napoleone	1–3, 5–6
EVR Corse	MV Agusta	MV Agusta F4 1000 R	29	(Italy) Niccolò Rosso	7–11
EVR Corse	MV Agusta	MV Agusta F4 1000 R	41	(United Kingdom) Howie Mainwarnig	4
MV Agusta	MV Agusta	MV Agusta F4 1000 R	312	(Italy) Luca Scassa	6, 11
Revolution - UnionBike	MV Agusta	MV Agusta F4 1000 R	42	(Germany) Leonardo Biliotti	1–7, 9–11
STP Racing	MV Agusta	MV Agusta F4 1000 R	8	(United Kingdom) Victor Cox	8
UnionBike Gimotorsport	MV Agusta	MV Agusta F4 1000 R	11	(Italy) Denis Sacchetti	1–3, 5–11
UnionBike Gimotorsport	MV Agusta	MV Agusta F4 1000 R	99	(Italy) Danilo Dell'Omo	All
Action Bike	Suzuki	Suzuki GSX-R1000 K6	27	(France) Cyril Brivet	11
Alstare Suzuki Corona Extra	Suzuki	Suzuki GSX-R1000 K6	19	(Belgium) Xavier Simeon	All
Best Box Racing	Suzuki	Suzuki GSX-R1000 K6	91	(Netherlands) Danny De Boer	3
Celani Team Suzuki Italia	Suzuki	Suzuki GSX-R1000 K6	3	(Australia) Mark Aitchison	All
Celani Team Suzuki Italia	Suzuki	Suzuki GSX-R1000 K6	37	(Italy) Raffaele Filice	All
Cruciani Moto Suzuki Italia	Suzuki	Suzuki GSX-R1000 K6	57	(Italy) Ilario Dionisi	All
Full-Gas Racing Team	Suzuki	Suzuki GSX-R1000 K6	13	(Hungary) Victor Kispataki	All
Full-Gas Racing Team	Suzuki	Suzuki GSX-R1000 K6	34	(Hungary) Balázs Németh	All
Heron Racing Team	Suzuki	Suzuki GSX-R1000 K6	17	(Czech Republic) Milos Urbanec	7
Mist Suzuki	Suzuki	Suzuki GSX-R1000 K6	18	(United Kingdom) Matt Bond	All
MSG Podium	Suzuki	Suzuki GSX-R1000 K6	73	(United Kingdom) Jonathan Howarth	1
Racing Dirk Van Mol	Suzuki	Suzuki GSX-R1000 K6	72	(United Kingdom) Adam Jenkinson	10–11
Rocket Center Racing	Suzuki	Suzuki GSX-R1000 K6	72	(United Kingdom) Adam Jenkinson	1
Suzuki Grandys Duo PZM	Suzuki	Suzuki GSX-R1000 K6	2	(Poland) Bartłomiej Wiczynski	7
Team Yohann Moto Sport	Suzuki	Suzuki GSX-R1000 K6	23	(France) Cédric Tangre	9, 11
3Man Racing	Yamaha	Yamaha YZF-R1	134	(South Africa) Greg Gildenhuys	5
DBR Racing Team	Yamaha	Yamaha YZF-R1	23	(France) Cédric Tangre	1–8
DBR Racing Team	Yamaha	Yamaha YZF-R1	24	(Slovenia) Marko Jerman	All
DBR Racing Team	Yamaha	Yamaha YZF-R1	38	(Spain) Manuel Hernández	9–10
DBR Racing Team	Yamaha	Yamaha YZF-R1	76	(Italy) Diego Ciavattini	11
Endurance Moto 38	Yamaha	Yamaha YZF-R1	47	(France) Julien Millet	11
G.R. Motorsport	Yamaha	Yamaha YZF-R1	20	(United Kingdom) Jon Boy Lee	8
MGM Racing Performance	Yamaha	Yamaha YZF-R1	25	(Germany) Dario Giuseppetti	All
MGM Racing Performance	Yamaha	Yamaha YZF-R1	88	(Germany) Timo Gieseler	All
Peko Racing	Yamaha	Yamaha YZF-R1	56	(Switzerland) Daniel Sutter	2–11
RCGM Team	Yamaha	Yamaha YZF-R1	66	(Italy) Luca Verdini	4, 10
RG Team	Yamaha	Yamaha YZF-R1	58	(Italy) Robert Gianfardoni	All
Team Oliveira	Yamaha	Yamaha YZF-R1	22	(Netherlands) Allard Kerkhoven	9
Team Zone Rouge	Yamaha	Yamaha YZF-R1	21	(Belgium) Wim Van Den Broeck	All
Team Zone Rouge	Yamaha	Yamaha YZF-R1	55	(Belgium) Olivier Depoorter	1–9
Team Zone Rouge	Yamaha	Yamaha YZF-R1	78	(France) Freddy Foray	10–11
TTSL-MGM Racing	Yamaha	Yamaha YZF-R1	83	(Belgium) Didier Van Keymeulen	1–5, 7–11
Umbria Bike	Yamaha	Yamaha YZF-R1	15	(Italy) Matteo Baiocco	All
VD Heyden Motors Yamaha	Yamaha	Yamaha YZF-R1	16	(Netherlands) Raymond Schouten	All
VD Heyden Motors Yamaha	Yamaha	Yamaha YZF-R1	44	(Austria) René Mähr	All
Yamaha Factory	Yamaha	Yamaha YZF-R1	74	(Spain) Jordi Torres	2
Yamaha Team Italia	Yamaha	Yamaha YZF-R1	51	(Italy) Michele Pirro	All
Yamaha Team Italia	Yamaha	Yamaha YZF-R1	71	(Italy) Claudio Corti	All

Key
Regular rider
Wildcard rider
Replacement rider

- All entries used Pirelli tyres.

== Championship' standings ==
=== Riders' standings ===
Pos.	Rider	Bike	DON (Europe)	VAL (Spain)	NED (Netherlands)	ITA (Italy)	SIL (United Kingdom)	SMR (San Marino)	CZE (Czech Republic)	GBR (United Kingdom)	GER (Germany)	VAL (Italy)	FRA (France)	Pts
1	(Italy) Niccolò Canepa	Ducati	1	3	6	10	13	5	**7**	1	**2**	**2**	**3**	161
2	(Italy) Claudio Corti	Yamaha	2	11	**2**	Ret	10	4	3	**3**	3	1	2	157
3	(Italy) Matteo Baiocco	Yamaha	5	4	5	1	6	**1**	2	4	8	6	9	153
4	(Belgium) Xavier Simeon	Suzuki	7	6	8	5	4	2	1	2	5	5	Ret	138
5	(Australia) Mark Aitchison	Suzuki	4	1	Ret	2	2	7	4	8	4	27	5	132
6	(Italy) Ilario Dionisi	Suzuki	6	5	4	3	12	3	9	7	9	7	7	111
7	(Italy) Michele Pirro	Yamaha	**30**	2	1	**Ret**	**5**	13	5	9	Ret	8	DNS	85
8	(Belgium) Didier Van Keymeulen	Yamaha	3	Ret	3	4	DNS		8	Ret	1	11	Ret	83
9	(Italy) Ayrton Badovini	MV Agusta	Ret	**Ret**	31	Ret	9	Ret	Ret	6	7	3	1	67
10	(Australia) Brendan Roberts	Ducati		WD	7	15	1	10	Ret	5	16	4	Ret	65
11	(Austria) René Mähr	Yamaha	10	7	13	8	Ret	9	6	Ret	11	10	10	60
12	(Czech Republic) Matěj Smrž	Honda	19	8	9	17	3	14	10	11	13	Ret	11	52
13	(South Africa) Sheridan Morais	Ducati	9	13	25	7	DNS	6	Ret	12	12	Ret	Ret	37
14	(Germany) Arne Tode	Honda	8	15	Ret	12	18	11	Ret	10	6			34
15	(Germany) Dario Giuseppetti	Yamaha	12	Ret	16	Ret	15	25	11	21	10	14	8	26
16	(Slovenia) Marko Jerman	Yamaha	11	10	Ret	6	14	26	22	28	22	25	19	23
17	(France) Cédric Tangre	Yamaha	14	9	14	13	7	19	23	22				23
17	(France) Cédric Tangre	Suzuki									17		Ret	23
18	(Italy) Danilo Dell'Omo	MV Agusta	31	Ret	10	9	25	Ret	14	14	14	Ret	16	19
19	(France) Freddy Foray	Yamaha										9	6	17
20	(Switzerland) Daniel Sutter	Yamaha		18	17	11	30	8	17	Ret	19	13	20	16
21	(Italy) Luca Scassa	MV Agusta						Ret					4	13
22	(Estonia) Marko Rohtlaan	Honda	13	14	15	14	19	16	20	30	15	16	12	13
23	(Italy) Denis Sacchetti	MV Agusta	Ret	12	DNS		16	20	12	13	DNQ	Ret	Ret	11
24	(France) Loïc Napoleone	MV Agusta	17	Ret	Ret		8	DNS						8
25	(Netherlands) Raymond Schouten	Yamaha	18	27	11	21	21	17	16	17	DNQ	21	Ret	5
26	(Italy) Lorenzo Baroni	Ducati	21	Ret	Ret	18	11	Ret			Ret	Ret	25	5
27	(Netherlands) Ronald Ter Braake	Kawasaki			12									4
27	(Netherlands) Ronald Ter Braake	Honda					31	27						4
28	(Germany) Leonardo Biliotti	MV Agusta	DNS	20	22	Ret	29	12	DNS		24	DNS	Ret	4
29	(Italy) Luca Verdini	Yamaha				Ret						12		4
30	(Hungary) Balázs Németh	Suzuki	Ret	17	18	25	22	29	13	18	18	15	17	4
31	(United Kingdom) Adam Jenkinson	Suzuki	DNS									18	13	3
32	(France) Cyril Brivet	Suzuki											14	2
33	(United States) Nicky Moore	Ducati	15	28	26	24								1
34	(Belgium) Olivier Depoorter	Yamaha	27	Ret	DNS	Ret	Ret	15	Ret	DNS	Ret			1
35	(Germany) Timo Gieseler	Yamaha	DNS	16	21	20	17	23	15	19	25	19	DNS	1
36	(United Kingdom) Barry Burrell	Honda	16	19	23	19	26	Ret	Ret	15	Ret	Ret	29	1
37	(France) Franck Millet	MV Agusta	20	24	20	16	23	18	18	24	20	24	15	1
	(Belgium) Wim Van Den Broeck	Yamaha	24	Ret	29	Ret	28	22	Ret	16	29	26	27	0
	(Italy) Giacomo Romanelli	Ducati										17		0
	(France) Julien Millet	Yamaha											18	0
	(Netherlands) Bram Appelo	Honda	Ret	30	19	Ret			26	DNS	31	Ret		0
	(Italy) Raffaele Filice	Suzuki	25	26	24	29	35	31	19	23	30	Ret	24	0
	(Italy) Niccolò Rosso	Ducati	26	Ret	34	28	20	Ret						0
	(Italy) Niccolò Rosso	MV Agusta							Ret	29	32	Ret	Ret	0
	(United Kingdom) Matt Bond	Suzuki	28	23	33	26	24	24	DNS	20	26	22	21	0
	(Spain) Manuel Hernández	Yamaha									Ret	20		0
	(Spain) Jordi Torres	Yamaha		21										0
	(Italy) Enrico Sirch	Honda						21						0
	(Hungary) Victor Kispataki	Suzuki	23	25	28	27	34	30	21	31	28	23	28	0
	(Netherlands) Allard Kerkhoven	Yamaha									21			0
	(Slovenia) Luka Nedog	Ducati	DNS	22	27	22	33	DNS	25	27	23	Ret	26	0
	(Italy) Diego Ciavattini	Yamaha											22	0
	(Italy) Tommaso Lorenzetti	Kawasaki				23								0
	(South Africa) Greg Gildenhuys	Yamaha					27							0
	(South Africa) Greg Gildenhuys	Ducati						28	27	Ret	27	Ret	23	0
	(Czech Republic) Milos Urbanec	Suzuki							24					0
	(United Kingdom) Victor Cox	MV Agusta								25				0
	(United Kingdom) Jon Boy Lee	Yamaha								26				0
	(Italy) Robert Gianfardoni	Yamaha	29	29	32	Ret	32	Ret	28	DNQ	Ret	Ret	DNQ	0
	(Netherlands) Danny De Boer	Suzuki			30									0
	(Poland) Bartłomiej Wiczynski	Suzuki							Ret					0
	(United Kingdom) Howie Mainwarnig	MV Agusta				DNS								
Pos.	Rider	Bike	DON (Europe)	VAL (Spain)	NED (Netherlands)	ITA (Italy)	SIL (United Kingdom)	SMR (San Marino)	CZE (Czech Republic)	GBR (United Kingdom)	GER (Germany)	VAL (Italy)	FRA (France)	Pts

Colour	Result
Gold	Winner
Silver	Second place
Bronze	Third place
Green	Points classification
Blue	Non-points classification
Blue	Non-classified finish (NC)
Purple	Retired, not classified (Ret)
Red	Did not qualify (DNQ)
Red	Did not pre-qualify (DNPQ)
Black	Disqualified (DSQ)
White	Did not start (DNS)
White	Withdrew (WD)
White	Race cancelled (C)
Blank	Did not practice (DNP)
Blank	Did not arrive (DNA)
Blank	Excluded (EX)

**Bold** – Pole position
Italics – Fastest lap

=== Manufacturers' standings ===
Manufacturers standing
Pos.	Manufacturer	DON (Europe)	VAL (Spain)	NED (Netherlands)	ITA (Italy)	SIL (United Kingdom)	SMR (San Marino)	CZE (Czech Republic)	GBR (United Kingdom)	GER (Germany)	VAL (Italy)	FRA (France)	Pts
1	(Japan) Yamaha	2	2	1	1	5	1	2	3	1	1	2	232
2	(Japan) Suzuki	4	1	4	2	2	2	1	2	4	5	5	191
3	(Italy) Ducati	1	3	6	7	1	5	7	1	2	2	3	186
4	(Italy) MV Agusta	17	12	10	9	8	12	12	6	7	3	1	93
5	(Japan) Honda	8	8	9	12	3	11	10	10	6	16	11	75
6	(Japan) Kawasaki			12	23								4
Pos	Manufacturer	DON (Europe)	VAL (Spain)	NED (Netherlands)	ITA (Italy)	SIL (United Kingdom)	SMR (San Marino)	CZE (Czech Republic)	GBR (United Kingdom)	GER (Germany)	VAL (Italy)	FRA (France)	Pts
