= 2008 Misano Superbike World Championship round =

(Italy) 2008 Misano Superbike World Championship round
Round details
- Round 8 of 14 rounds in the 2008 Superbike World Championship. and Round 7 of 13 rounds in the 2008 Supersport World Championship.
- Date: June 29, 2008
- Location: Misano
- Course: Permanent racing facility 4.226 km (2.626 mi)

Superbike World Championship
Pole position
(Australia) Troy Corser
1:35.993
Fastest lap race 1	Fastest lap race 2
(Czech Republic) Jakub Smrž	(Australia) Troy Corser
1:37.694	1:37.580

Supersport World Championship
Pole position
(Australia) Broc Parkes
1:39.398
Fastest lap
(Australia) Broc Parkes
1:40.187

The 2008 Misano Superbike World Championship round was the eighth round of the 2008 Superbike World Championship. It took place on the weekend of June 27–29, 2008, at the Misano Adriatico circuit.

== Superbike race 1 classification ==
Pos	No	Rider	Bike	Laps	Time	Grid	Points
1	76	(Germany) Max Neukirchner	Suzuki GSX-R1000	24	39:27.918	10	25
2	11	(Australia) Troy Corser	Yamaha YZF-R1	24	+0.542	1	20
3	21	(Australia) Troy Bayliss	Ducati 1098 F08	24	+2.249	2	16
4	111	(Spain) Rubén Xaus	Ducati 1098 RS 08	24	+3.028	3	13
5	7	(Spain) Carlos Checa	Honda CBR1000RR	24	+5.408	11	11
6	57	(Italy) Lorenzo Lanzi	Ducati 1098 RS 08	24	+5.518	6	10
7	96	(Czech Republic) Jakub Smrž	Ducati 1098 RS 08	24	+6.202	7	9
8	36	(Spain) Gregorio Lavilla	Honda CBR1000RR	24	+18.279	19	8
9	38	(Japan) Shinichi Nakatomi	Yamaha YZF-R1	24	+19.072	20	7
10	41	(Japan) Noriyuki Haga	Yamaha YZF-R1	24	+19.132	14	6
11	34	(Japan) Yukio Kagayama	Suzuki GSX-R1000	24	+28.098	13	5
12	10	(Spain) Fonsi Nieto	Suzuki GSX-R1000	24	+34.385	9	4
13	88	(Japan) Shuhei Aoyama	Honda CBR1000RR	24	+34.572	23	3
14	23	(Japan) Ryuichi Kiyonari	Honda CBR1000RR	24	+34.902	22	2
15	94	(Spain) David Checa	Yamaha YZF-R1	24	+39.979	18	1
16	194	(France) Sébastien Gimbert	Yamaha YZF-R1	24	+44.669	21	
17	44	(Italy) Roberto Rolfo	Honda CBR1000RR	24	+49.290	17	
18	54	(Turkey) Kenan Sofuoğlu	Honda CBR1000RR	24	+59.304	24	
Ret	86	(Italy) Ayrton Badovini	Kawasaki ZX-10R	19	Retirement	16	
Ret	31	(Australia) Karl Muggeridge	Honda CBR1000RR	17	Retirement	15	
Ret	3	(Italy) Max Biaggi	Ducati 1098 RS 08	11	Accident	5	
Ret	84	(Italy) Michel Fabrizio	Ducati 1098 F08	11	Retirement	4	
Ret	100	(Japan) Makoto Tamada	Kawasaki ZX-10R	6	Accident	12	
Ret	43	(United States) Jason Pridmore	Honda CBR1000RR	6	Retirement	27	
Ret	13	(Italy) Vittorio Iannuzzo	Kawasaki ZX-10R	3	Accident	25	
Ret	55	(France) Régis Laconi	Kawasaki ZX-10R	0	Accident	8	

== Superbike race 2 classification ==
Pos	No	Rider	Bike	Laps	Time	Grid	Points
1	111	(Spain) Rubén Xaus	Ducati 1098 RS 08	24	39:19.710	3	25
2	3	(Italy) Max Biaggi	Ducati 1098 RS 08	24	+1.035	5	20
3	21	(Australia) Troy Bayliss	Ducati 1098 F08	24	+4.158	2	16
4	41	(Japan) Noriyuki Haga	Yamaha YZF-R1	24	+5.466	14	13
5	11	(Australia) Troy Corser	Yamaha YZF-R1	24	+6.759	1	11
6	57	(Italy) Lorenzo Lanzi	Ducati 1098 RS 08	24	+13.468	6	10
7	76	(Germany) Max Neukirchner	Suzuki GSX-R1000	24	+15.221	10	9
8	7	(Spain) Carlos Checa	Honda CBR1000RR	24	+16.687	11	8
9	96	(Czech Republic) Jakub Smrž	Ducati 1098 RS 08	24	+17.030	7	7
10	10	(Spain) Fonsi Nieto	Suzuki GSX-R1000	24	+17.681	9	6
11	84	(Italy) Michel Fabrizio	Ducati 1098 F08	24	+21.356	4	5
12	34	(Japan) Yukio Kagayama	Suzuki GSX-R1000	24	+28.676	13	4
13	23	(Japan) Ryuichi Kiyonari	Honda CBR1000RR	24	+31.304	22	3
14	36	(Spain) Gregorio Lavilla	Honda CBR1000RR	24	+32.339	19	2
15	38	(Japan) Shinichi Nakatomi	Yamaha YZF-R1	24	+33.716	20	1
16	94	(Spain) David Checa	Yamaha YZF-R1	24	+34.171	18	
17	86	(Italy) Ayrton Badovini	Kawasaki ZX-10R	24	+40.638	16	
18	44	(Italy) Roberto Rolfo	Honda CBR1000RR	24	+41.136	17	
19	88	(Japan) Shuhei Aoyama	Honda CBR1000RR	24	+49.699	23	
Ret	43	(United States) Jason Pridmore	Honda CBR1000RR	23	Retirement	27	
Ret	194	(France) Sébastien Gimbert	Yamaha YZF-R1	14	Retirement	21	
Ret	13	(Italy) Vittorio Iannuzzo	Kawasaki ZX-10R	8	Retirement	25	
Ret	55	(France) Régis Laconi	Kawasaki ZX-10R	5	Retirement	8	
Ret	100	(Japan) Makoto Tamada	Kawasaki ZX-10R	2	Accident	12	
Ret	31	(Australia) Karl Muggeridge	Honda CBR1000RR	2	Retirement	15	
Ret	54	(Turkey) Kenan Sofuoğlu	Honda CBR1000RR	0	Accident	24	

== Supersport race classification ==
Pos	No	Rider	Bike	Laps	Time	Grid	Points
1	88	(Australia) Andrew Pitt	Honda CBR600RR	22	37:08.387	2	25
2	18	(United Kingdom) Craig Jones	Honda CBR600RR	22	+5.347	4	20
3	65	(United Kingdom) Jonathan Rea	Honda CBR600RR	22	+9.183	6	16
4	99	(France) Fabien Foret	Yamaha YZF-R6	22	+13.784	3	13
5	127	(Denmark) Robbin Harms	Honda CBR600RR	22	+15.863	14	11
6	8	(Australia) Mark Aitchison	Triumph 675	22	+15.967	8	10
7	55	(Italy) Massimo Roccoli	Yamaha YZF-R6	22	+21.689	13	9
8	77	(Netherlands) Barry Veneman	Suzuki GSX-R600	22	+24.070	9	8
9	47	(Italy) Ivan Clementi	Triumph 675	22	+26.075	18	7
10	23	(Australia) Broc Parkes	Yamaha YZF-R6	22	+30.387	1	6
11	105	(Italy) Gianluca Vizziello	Honda CBR600RR	22	+32.578	16	5
12	9	(United Kingdom) Chris Walker	Kawasaki ZX-6R	22	+34.648	24	4
13	69	(Italy) Gianluca Nannelli	Honda CBR600RR	22	+36.040	23	3
14	25	(Australia) Josh Brookes	Honda CBR600RR	22	+37.896	5	2
15	125	(Italy) Danilo Marrancone	Yamaha YZF-R6	22	+40.167	15	1
16	113	(Italy) Roberto Lunadei	Honda CBR600RR	22	+40.841	21	
17	37	(San Marino) William de Angelis	Honda CBR600RR	22	+40.960	31	
18	83	(Belgium) Didier van Keymeulen	Suzuki GSX-R600	22	+43.302	20	
19	30	(Germany) Jesco Gunther	Honda CBR600RR	22	+45.275	34	
20	199	(Italy) Danilo dell'Omo	Honda CBR600RR	22	+47.944	27	
21	4	(Italy) Lorenzo Alfonsi	Honda CBR600RR	22	+49.173	30	
22	38	(France) Gregory Leblanc	Honda CBR600RR	22	+49.431	25	
23	80	(Italy) Alessandro Brannetti	Yamaha YZF-R6	22	+51.984	22	
24	81	(United Kingdom) Graeme Gowland	Honda CBR600RR	22	+52.547	33	
25	12	(Spain) Javier Hidalgo	Yamaha YZF-R6	22	+1:06.850	37	
26	34	(Hungary) Balázs Németh	Honda CBR600RR	22	+1:10.227	36	
27	51	(Spain) Santiago Barragán	Honda CBR600RR	22	+1:13.881	35	
28	72	(Hungary) Attila Magda	Honda CBR600RR	22	+1:29.572	38	
Ret	28	(Italy) Ruggero Scambia	Triumph 675	21	Accident	26	
Ret	31	(Finland) Vesa Kallio	Honda CBR600RR	13	Retirement	12	
Ret	17	(Portugal) Miguel Praia	Honda CBR600RR	11	Retirement	29	
Ret	24	(Australia) Garry McCoy	Triumph 675	10	Retirement	19	
Ret	21	(Japan) Katsuaki Fujiwara	Kawasaki ZX-6R	9	Retirement	32	
Ret	26	(Spain) Joan Lascorz	Honda CBR600RR	6	Retirement	10	
Ret	44	(Spain) David Salom	Yamaha YZF-R6	2	Accident	17	
Ret	14	(France) Matthieu Lagrive	Honda CBR600RR	2	Accident	11	
Ret	111	(Germany) Arne Tode	Honda CBR600RR	2	Accident	28	
Ret	11	(Australia) Russell Holland	Honda CBR600RR	1	Accident	7	

== Superstock 1000 race classification ==
Pos.	No.	Rider	Bike	Laps	Time/Retired	Grid	Points
1	53	(Italy) Alessandro Polita	Ducati 1098R	14	23:37.092	7	25
2	51	(Italy) Michele Pirro	Yamaha YZF-R1	14	+1.471	1	20
3	21	(France) Maxime Berger	Honda CBR1000RR	14	+2.382	3	16
4	155	(Australia) Brendan Roberts	Ducati 1098R	14	+5.234	4	13
5	19	(Belgium) Xavier Simeon	Suzuki GSX-R1000 K8	14	+6.999	12	11
6	8	(Italy) Andrea Antonelli	Honda CBR1000RR	14	+7.826	6	10
7	89	(Italy) Domenico Colucci	Ducati 1098R	14	+11.349	11	9
8	78	(France) Freddy Foray	Suzuki GSX-R1000 K8	14	+13.493	17	8
9	23	(Australia) Chris Seaton	Suzuki GSX-R1000 K8	14	+14.110	9	7
10	88	(France) Kenny Foray	Yamaha YZF-R1	14	+15.238	16	6
11	45	(Italy) Luca Verdini	Yamaha YZF-R1	14	+17.081	14	5
12	71	(Italy) Claudio Corti	Yamaha YZF-R1	14	+17.546	10	4
13	77	(United Kingdom) Barry Burrell	Honda CBR1000RR	14	+18.799	23	3
14	20	(France) Sylvain Barrier	Yamaha YZF-R1	14	+23.705	21	2
15	15	(Italy) Matteo Baiocco	Kawasaki ZX-10R	14	+23.818	18	1
16	87	(Australia) Gareth Jones	Suzuki GSX-R1000 K8	14	+25.024	24	
17	132	(France) Yoann Tiberio	Kawasaki ZX-10R	14	+29.595	22	
18	16	(Netherlands) Raymond Schouten	Yamaha YZF-R1	14	+30.075	15	
19	12	(Italy) Alessio Aldrovandi	Kawasaki ZX-10R	14	+31.504	19	
20	34	(Italy) Davide Giugliano	Suzuki GSX-R1000 K8	14	+38.389	2	
21	117	(Italy) Denis Sacchetti	Ducati 1098R	14	+38.575	25	
22	14	(Sweden) Filip Backlund	Suzuki GSX-R1000 K8	14	+39.211	20	
23	5	(Netherlands) Danny De Boer	Suzuki GSX-R1000 K8	14	+40.034	26	
24	18	(United Kingdom) Matt Bond	Suzuki GSX-R1000 K8	14	+49.273	34	
25	7	(Austria) René Mähr	KTM 1190 RC8	14	+49.442	28	
26	99	(Netherlands) Roy Ten Napel	Suzuki GSX-R1000 K8	14	+50.200	31	
27	24	(Slovenia) Marko Jerman	Honda CBR1000RR	14	+51.785	35	
28	66	(Netherlands) Branko Srdanov	Yamaha YZF-R1	14	+52.191	36	
29	90	(Czech Republic) Michal Drobný	Honda CBR1000RR	14	+59.213	32	
30	92	(Slovenia) Jure Stibilj	Honda CBR1000RR	14	+1:12.140	38	
31	32	(Italy) Lorenzo Baroni	KTM 1190 RC8	14	1:18.718	37	
Ret	119	(Italy) Michele Magnoni	Yamaha YZF-R1	11	Retirement	13	
Ret	111	(Italy) Fabrizio Perotti	Suzuki GSX-R1000 K8	10	Accident	5	
Ret	57	(Australia) Cameron Stronach	Kawasaki ZX-10R	8	Retirement	33	
Ret	58	(Italy) Robert Gianfardoni	Ducati 1098R	6	Retirement	39	
Ret	30	(Switzerland) Michaël Savary	Suzuki GSX-R1000 K8	4	Retirement	29	
Ret	96	(Czech Republic) Matěj Smrž	Honda CBR1000RR	1	Accident	8	
Ret	154	(Italy) Tommaso Lorenzetti	Suzuki GSX-R1000 K8	1	Accident	30	
DNS	996	(Italy) Jonathan Gallina	Kawasaki ZX-10R		Did not start	27	
DNS	41	(Switzerland) Gregory Junod	Yamaha YZF-R1		Did not start		

== Superstock 600 race classification ==
Pos.	No.	Rider	Bike	Laps	Time/Retired	Grid	Points
1	77	(Czech Republic) Patrik Vostárek	Honda CBR600RR	10	17:12.285	1	25
2	5	(Italy) Marco Bussolotti	Yamaha YZF-R6	10	+1.959	2	20
3	65	(France) Loris Baz	Yamaha YZF-R6	10	+2.733	3	16
4	55	(Belgium) Vincent Lonbois	Suzuki GSX-R600	10	+7.175	6	13
5	24	(Italy) Daniele Beretta	Suzuki GSX-R600	10	+10.101	5	11
6	45	(United Kingdom) Dan Linfoot	Yamaha YZF-R6	10	+13.302	19	10
7	119	(Italy) Danilo Petrucci	Yamaha YZF-R6	10	+13.380	8	9
8	99	(United Kingdom) Gregg Black	Yamaha YZF-R6	10	+15.749	13	8
9	44	(United Kingdom) Gino Rea	Yamaha YZF-R6	10	+17.750	12	7
10	91	(Sweden) Hampus Johansson	Yamaha YZF-R6	10	+18.121	16	6
11	47	(Italy) Eddi La Marra	Suzuki GSX-R600	10	+18.429	21	5
12	3	(Italy) Giuliano Gregorini	Honda CBR600RR	10	+19.764	11	4
13	35	(Italy) Simone Grotzkyj	Honda CBR600RR	10	+22.318	15	3
14	7	(Italy) Renato Costantini	Yamaha YZF-R6	10	+23.783	9	2
15	36	(Italy) Davide Fanelli	Triumph 675	10	+23.883	7	1
16	11	(France) Jérémy Guarnoni	Yamaha YZF-R6	10	+26.726	22	
17	72	(Norway) Fredrik Karlsen	Yamaha YZF-R6	10	+27.678	27	
18	57	(Denmark) Kenny Tirsgaard	Suzuki GSX-R600	10	+29.034	23	
19	88	(Spain) Yannick Guerra	Yamaha YZF-R6	10	+30.908	24	
20	12	(United Kingdom) Sam Lowes	Honda CBR600RR	10	+31.325	14	
21	21	(United Kingdom) Alex Lowes	Kawasaki ZX-6R	10	+34.765	25	
22	10	(Spain) Nacho Calero	Yamaha YZF-R6	10	+38.655	26	
23	17	(United Kingdom) Robbie Stewart	Triumph 675	10	+47.289	29	
24	18	(France) Nicolas Pouhair	Yamaha YZF-R6	10	+1:04.628	17	
25	23	(Switzerland) Christian Von Gunten	Suzuki GSX-R600	10	+1:20.796	18	
26	14	(Belgium) Nicolas Pirot	Yamaha YZF-R6	10	+1:21.340	28	
DSQ	42	(Italy) Leonardo Biliotti	Honda CBR600RR	10	(+2.660)	4	
Ret	93	(France) Mathieu Lussiana	Yamaha YZF-R6	7	Retirement	20	
Ret	111	(Czech Republic) Michal Šembera	Honda CBR600RR	3	Accident	10	
