= 2007 Monza Superbike World Championship round =

2007 athletic competition

(Italy) 2007 Italian Superbike World Championship round
Round details
- Round 6 of 13 rounds in the 2007 Superbike World Championship. and Round 6 of 13 rounds in the 2007 Supersport World Championship.
- Date: May 13, 2007
- Location: Monza
- Course: Permanent racing facility 5.793 km (3.600 mi)

Superbike World Championship
Pole position
(Japan) Noriyuki Haga
1'44.941
Fastest lap race 1	Fastest lap race 2
(Italy) Max Biaggi	(Japan) Noriyuki Haga
1'46.172	1'46.064

Supersport World Championship
Pole position
(Turkey) Kenan Sofuoğlu
1'50.459
Fastest lap
(Turkey) Kenan Sofuoğlu
1'50.550

The 2007 Monza Superbike World Championship round was the sixth round of the 2007 Superbike World Championship season. It took place on the weekend of May 11–13, 2007, at the 5.793 km (3.600 mi) Monza circuit in Italy.

== Superbike race 1 classification ==
Pos	No	Rider	Bike	Laps	Time	Grid	Points
1	41	(Japan) Noriyuki Haga	Yamaha YZF-R1	18	32:04.428	1	25
2	21	(Australia) Troy Bayliss	Ducati 999 F07	18	+8.403	2	20
3	3	(Italy) Max Biaggi	Suzuki GSX-R1000 K7	18	+9.703	3	16
4	52	(United Kingdom) James Toseland	Honda CBR1000RR	18	+13.587	5	13
5	11	(Australia) Troy Corser	Yamaha YZF-R1	18	+14.898	4	11
6	71	(Japan) Yukio Kagayama	Suzuki GSX-R1000 K7	18	+14.954	8	10
7	57	(Italy) Lorenzo Lanzi	Ducati 999 F07	18	+19.517	12	9
8	84	(Italy) Michel Fabrizio	Honda CBR1000RR	18	+24.120	9	8
9	31	(Australia) Karl Muggeridge	Honda CBR1000RR	18	+24.682	6	7
10	76	(Germany) Max Neukirchner	Suzuki GSX-R1000 K6	18	+29.197	14	6
11	25	(Australia) Josh Brookes	Honda CBR1000RR	18	+32.654	11	5
12	111	(Spain) Ruben Xaus	Ducati 999 F06	18	+34.054	15	4
13	20	(Italy) Marco Borciani	Ducati 999 F06	18	+37.386	16	3
14	53	(Italy) Alex Polita	Suzuki GSX-R1000 K6	18	+37.704	20	2
15	96	(Czech Republic) Jakub Smrž	Ducati 999 F05	18	+41.377	17	1
16	99	(Australia) Steve Martin	Honda CBR1000RR	18	+42.730	18	
17	92	(Italy) Mauro Sanchini	Kawasaki ZX-10R	18	+59.096	19	
Ret	44	(Italy) Roberto Rolfo	Honda CBR1000RR	17	Retirement	10	
Ret	55	(France) Régis Laconi	Kawasaki ZX-10R	15	Retirement	7	
Ret	22	(Italy) Luca Morelli	Ducati 999RS	12	Retirement	22	
Ret	40	(Venezuela) Robertino Pietri	Yamaha YZF-R1	12	Retirement	23	
Ret	85	(Czech Republic) Marek Svoboda	Yamaha YZF-R1	11	Retirement	24	
Ret	42	(United Kingdom) Dean Ellison	Ducati 999RS	8	Retirement	21	
Ret	10	(Spain) Fonsi Nieto	Kawasaki ZX-10R	7	Retirement	13	

== Superbike race 2 classification ==
Pos	No	Rider	Bike	Laps	Time	Grid	Points
1	41	(Japan) Noriyuki Haga	Yamaha YZF-R1	18	32:05.318	1	25
2	52	(United Kingdom) James Toseland	Honda CBR1000RR	18	+2.691	5	20
3	21	(Australia) Troy Bayliss	Ducati 999 F07	18	+2.841	2	16
4	44	(Italy) Roberto Rolfo	Honda CBR1000RR	18	+3.188	10	13
5	3	(Italy) Max Biaggi	Suzuki GSX-R1000 K7	18	+3.551	3	11
6	11	(Australia) Troy Corser	Yamaha YZF-R1	18	+13.034	4	10
7	71	(Japan) Yukio Kagayama	Suzuki GSX-R1000 K7	18	+17.246	8	9
8	55	(France) Régis Laconi	Kawasaki ZX-10R	18	+18.410	7	8
9	31	(Australia) Karl Muggeridge	Honda CBR1000RR	18	+29.017	6	7
10	96	(Czech Republic) Jakub Smrž	Ducati 999 F05	18	+29.686	17	6
11	84	(Italy) Michel Fabrizio	Honda CBR1000RR	18	+30.371	9	5
12	76	(Germany) Max Neukirchner	Suzuki GSX-R1000 K6	18	+31.982	14	4
13	111	(Spain) Ruben Xaus	Ducati 999 F06	18	+32.165	15	3
14	40	(Venezuela) Robertino Pietri	Yamaha YZF-R1	18	+1:32.292	23	2
15	42	(United Kingdom) Dean Ellison	Ducati 999RS	18	+1:41.840	21	1
Ret	20	(Italy) Marco Borciani	Ducati 999 F06	15	Retirement	16	
Ret	99	(Australia) Steve Martin	Honda CBR1000RR	11	Retirement	18	
Ret	25	(Australia) Josh Brookes	Honda CBR1000RR	9	Retirement	11	
Ret	92	(Italy) Mauro Sanchini	Kawasaki ZX-10R	7	Retirement	19	
Ret	53	(Italy) Alex Polita	Suzuki GSX-R1000 K6	5	Retirement	20	
Ret	85	(Czech Republic) Marek Svoboda	Yamaha YZF-R1	1	Retirement	24	
Ret	10	(Spain) Fonsi Nieto	Kawasaki ZX-10R	1	Retirement	13	
Ret	57	(Italy) Lorenzo Lanzi	Ducati 999 F07	0	Retirement	12	

== Supersport classification ==
Pos	Rider	Bike	Time/Retired	Laps	Points
1	(Turkey) Kenan Sofuoğlu	Honda CBR600RR	29'44.471	16	25
2	(France) Fabien Foret	Kawasaki ZX-6R	29'48.463	16	20
3	(Australia) Anthony West	Yamaha YZF-R6	29'48.514	16	16
4	(Italy) Gianluca Nannelli	Ducati 749R	29'49.069	16	13
5	(Netherlands) Barry Veneman	Suzuki GSX-R600	29'52.819	16	11
6	(Japan) Katsuaki Fujiwara	Honda CBR600RR	29'54.794	16	10
7	(France) Yoann Tiberio	Honda CBR600RR	30'07.092	16	9
8	(Italy) Lorenzo Alfonsi	Honda CBR600RR	30'10.084	16	8
9	(Spain) David Salom	Yamaha YZF-R6	30'10.139	16	7
10	(Italy) Simone Sanna	Honda CBR600RR	30'10.173	16	6
11	(Italy) Massimo Roccoli	Yamaha YZF-R6	30'10.328	16	5
12	(Spain) Pere Riba	Kawasaki ZX-6R	30'11.033	16	4
13	(Finland) Vesa Kallio	Suzuki GSX-R600	30'11.089	16	3
14	(Spain) David Checa	Yamaha YZF-R6	30'15.545	16	2
15	(Spain) Joan Lascorz	Honda CBR600RR	30'18.208	16	1
16	(Russia) Vladimir Ivanov	Yamaha YZF-R6	30'18.921	16	
17	(France) Sébastien Gimbert	Yamaha YZF-R6	30'28.442	16	
18	(Italy) Alessio Velini	Yamaha YZF-R6	30'28.931	16	
19	(France) Julien Enjolras	Yamaha YZF-R6	30'29.729	16	
20	(Italy) Gianluca Vizziello	Yamaha YZF-R6	30'41.946	16	
21	(Portugal) Miguel Praia	Honda CBR600RR	30'44.425	16	
22	(Austria) Yves Polzer	Ducati 749R	30'50.750	16	
23	(Sweden) Nikola Milovanovic	Honda CBR600RR	30'54.043	16	
24	(Germany) Jesco Günther	Honda CBR600RR	30'54.127	16	
25	(Spain) David Forner	Yamaha YZF-R6	31'20.822	16	
Ret	(France) Sébastien Charpentier	Honda CBR600RR	24'16.480	13	
Ret	(Italy) Gilles Boccolini	Kawasaki ZX-6R	24'37.799	13	
Ret	(France) Gregory Leblanc	Honda CBR600RR	25'25.314	13	
Ret	(France) Matthieu Lagrive	Honda CBR600RR	19'38.345	10	
Ret	(United Kingdom) Craig Jones	Honda CBR600RR	16'55.941	9	
Ret	(Spain) Javier Fores	Honda CBR600RR	15'22.703	8	
Ret	(Canada) Chris Peris	Yamaha YZF-R6	10'06.667	5	
Ret	(Australia) Broc Parkes	Yamaha YZF-R6	7'27.541	4	
Ret	(Denmark) Robbin Harms	Honda CBR600RR	5'38.348	3	

== Superstock 1000 classification ==
Pos	No.	Rider	Bike	Laps	Time/Retired	Grid	Points
1	15	(Italy) Matteo Baiocco	Yamaha YZF-R1	11	20:19.109	4	25
2	3	(Australia) Mark Aitchison	Suzuki GSX-R1000 K6	11	+0.004	7	20
3	57	(Italy) Ilario Dionisi	Suzuki GSX-R1000 K6	11	+0.136	6	16
4	83	(Belgium) Didier Van Keymeulen	Yamaha YZF-R1	11	+0.510	5	13
5	19	(Belgium) Xavier Simeon	Suzuki GSX-R1000 K6	11	+5.949	8	11
6	24	(Slovenia) Marko Jerman	Yamaha YZF-R1	11	+7.712	13	10
7	32	(South Africa) Sheridan Morais	Ducati 1098S	11	+8.132	10	9
8	44	(Austria) René Mähr	Yamaha YZF-R1	11	+14.693	16	8
9	99	(Italy) Danilo Dell'Omo	MV Agusta F4 312 R	11	+14.743	3	7
10	59	(Italy) Niccolò Canepa	Ducati 1098S	11	+15.193	12	6
11	56	(Switzerland) Daniel Sutter	Yamaha YZF-R1	11	+20.413	26	5
12	49	(Germany) Arne Tode	Honda CBR1000RR	11	+20.731	9	4
13	23	(France) Cédric Tangre	Yamaha YZF-R1	11	+21.135	21	3
14	33	(Estonia) Marko Rohtlaan	Honda CBR1000RR	11	+21.565	27	2
15	155	(Australia) Brendan Roberts	Ducati 1098S	11	+21.794	18	1
16	10	(France) Franck Millet	MV Agusta F4 312 R	11	+24.526	23	
17	96	(Czech Republic) Matěj Smrž	Honda CBR1000RR	11	+24.536	17	
18	14	(Italy) Lorenzo Baroni	Ducati 1098S	11	+28.214	14	
19	77	(United Kingdom) Barry Burrell	Honda CBR1000RR	11	+29.027	25	
20	88	(Germany) Timo Gieseler	Yamaha YZF-R1	11	+38.703	29	
21	16	(Netherlands) Raymond Schouten	Yamaha YZF-R1	11	+38.731	24	
22	75	(Slovenia) Luka Nedog	Ducati 1098S	11	+38.880	32	
23	53	(Italy) Tommaso Lorenzetti	Kawasaki ZX-10R	11	+40.658	30	
24	28	(United States) Nicky Moore	Ducati 1098S	11	+41.253	28	
25	34	(Hungary) Balázs Németh	Suzuki GSX-R1000 K6	11	+41.283	31	
26	18	(United Kingdom) Matt Bond	Suzuki GSX-R1000 K6	11	+1:02.952	37	
27	13	(Hungary) Victor Kispataki	Suzuki GSX-R1000 K6	11	+1:05.138	36	
28	29	(Italy) Niccolò Rosso	Ducati 1098S	11	+1:05.241	38	
29	37	(Italy) Raffaele Filice	Suzuki GSX-R1000 K6	11	+1:22.956	39	
Ret	55	(Belgium) Olivier Depoorter	Yamaha YZF-R1	10	Accident	22	
Ret	42	(Italy) Leonardo Biliotti	MV Agusta F4 312 R	10	Accident	15	
Ret	25	(Italy) Dario Giuseppetti	Yamaha YZF-R1	10	Accident	19	
Ret	51	(Italy) Michele Pirro	Yamaha YZF-R1	9	Accident	1	
Ret	86	(Italy) Ayrton Badovini	MV Agusta F4 312 R	6	Retirement	11	
Ret	66	(Italy) Luca Verdini	Yamaha YZF-R1	6	Retirement	20	
Ret	71	(Italy) Claudio Corti	Yamaha YZF-R1	3	Accident	2	
Ret	58	(Italy) Robert Gianfardoni	Yamaha YZF-R1	1	Accident	34	
Ret	5	(Netherlands) Bram Appelo	Honda CBR1000RR	1	Accident	35	
Ret	21	(Belgium) Wim Van Den Broeck	Yamaha YZF-R1	1	Retirement	33	
DNS	41	(United Kingdom) Howie Mainwaring	MV Agusta F4 312 R		Did not start		

=== STK600 race classification ===
Pos.	No.	Rider	Bike	Laps	Time/Retired	Grid	Points
1	119	(Italy) Michele Magnoni	Yamaha YZF-R6	8	15:28.902	1	25
2	199	(United Kingdom) Gregg Black	Yamaha YZF-R6	8	+0.079	2	20
3	29	(Italy) Marco Bussolotti	Yamaha YZF-R6	8	+0.232	4	16
4	20	(France) Sylvain Barrier	Yamaha YZF-R6	8	+0.426	5	13
5	89	(Italy) Domenico Colucci	Ducati 749R	8	+0.493	10	11
6	21	(France) Maxime Berger	Yamaha YZF-R6	8	+0.632	3	10
7	8	(Italy) Andrea Antonelli	Honda CBR600RR	8	+1.220	6	9
8	75	(Germany) Dennis Sigloch	Yamaha YZF-R6	8	+1.483	17	8
9	99	(Netherlands) Roy Ten Napel	Yamaha YZF-R6	8	+5.284	9	7
10	4	(France) Mathieu Gines	Yamaha YZF-R6	8	+5.396	7	6
11	30	(Switzerland) Michaël Savary	Yamaha YZF-R6	8	+10.013	14	5
12	7	(Italy) Renato Costantini	Honda CBR600RR	8	+15.779	18	4
13	57	(Denmark) Kenny Tirsgaard	Suzuki GSX-R600	8	+19.736	13	3
14	44	(United Kingdom) Gino Rea	Suzuki GSX-R600	8	+19.934	23	2
15	112	(Spain) Josep Pedró	Yamaha YZF-R6	8	+19.999	22	1
16	41	(Switzerland) Gregory Junod	Kawasaki ZX-6R	8	+21.354	27	
17	81	(Czech Republic) Patrik Vostárek	Honda CBR600RR	8	+25.394	12	
18	27	(South Africa) Chris Leeson	Suzuki GSX-R600	8	+25.571	19	
19	47	(Italy) Eddi La Marra	Honda CBR600RR	8	+25.632	16	
20	31	(Italy) Giuseppe Barone	Honda CBR600RR	8	+26.747	24	
21	55	(Belgium) Vincent Lonbois	Suzuki GSX-R600	8	+27.177	28	
22	48	(Russia) Vladimir Leonov	Yamaha YZF-R6	8	+32.780	29	
23	28	(Spain) Yannick Guerra	Yamaha YZF-R6	8	+34.056	25	
24	66	(Netherlands) Branko Srdanov	Yamaha YZF-R6	8	+37.436	30	
25	35	(Bulgaria) Radostin Todorov	Yamaha YZF-R6	8	+50.839	32	
26	10	(United Kingdom) Leon Hunt	Honda CBR600RR	8	+51.281	31	
Ret	43	(Italy) Daniele Rossi	Honda CBR600RR	7	Accident	23	
Ret	111	(Czech Republic) Michal Šembera	Honda CBR600RR	7	Accident	21	
Ret	114	(Belgium) Nicolas Pirot	Yamaha YZF-R6	5	Accident	26	
Ret	24	(Italy) Daniele Beretta	Suzuki GSX-R600	4	Retirement	11	
Ret	32	(Italy) Danilo Petrucci	Yamaha YZF-R6	2	Retirement	8	
Ret	22	(Italy) Gabriele Poma	Yamaha YZF-R6	1	Accident	15	
Ret	25	(Australia) Ryan Taylor	Kawasaki ZX-6R	0	Retirement	33	
