= 2007 Eurospeedway Lausitz Superbike World Championship round =

(Germany) 2007 German Superbike World Championship round
Round details
- Round 11 of 13 rounds in the 2007 Superbike World Championship. and Round 11 of 13 rounds in the 2007 Supersport World Championship.
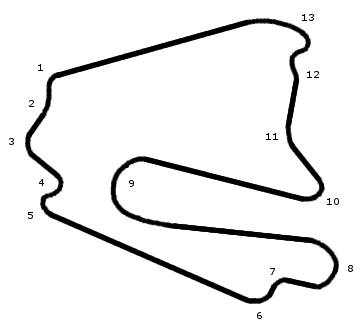
- Date: September 9, 2007
- Location: EuroSpeedway Lausitz
- Course: Permanent racing facility 4.265 km (2.650 mi)

Superbike World Championship
Pole position
(Spain) Fonsi Nieto
1'50.681 (Wet)
Fastest lap race 1	Fastest lap race 2
(Japan) Noriyuki Haga	(Japan) Noriyuki Haga
1'39.033	1'38.622

Supersport World Championship
Pole position
(France) Sébastien Charpentier
1'41.366
Fastest lap
(Turkey) Kenan Sofuoğlu
1'41.946

The 2007 German Superbike World Championship round, held on September 9 at EuroSpeedway Lausitz, was the 11th of 13 rounds. Fonsi Nieto took pole in Superbike, with Noriyuki Haga setting the fastest laps. In Supersport, Sébastien Charpentier secured pole, while Kenan Sofuoğlu clocked the fastest lap.

== Superbike race 1 classification ==
Pos	No	Rider	Bike	Laps	Time	Grid	Points
1	41	(Japan) Noriyuki Haga	Yamaha YZF-R1	24	40:02.923	8	25
2	3	(Italy) Max Biaggi	Suzuki GSX-R1000 K7	24	+11.007	5	20
3	11	(Australia) Troy Corser	Yamaha YZF-R1	24	+11.628	4	16
4	21	(Australia) Troy Bayliss	Ducati 999 F07	24	+22.156	3	13
5	44	(Italy) Roberto Rolfo	Honda CBR1000RR	24	+26.082	10	11
6	55	(France) Régis Laconi	Kawasaki ZX-10R	24	+26.381	2	10
7	10	(Spain) Fonsi Nieto	Kawasaki ZX-10R	24	+36.870	1	9
8	57	(Italy) Lorenzo Lanzi	Ducati 999 F07	24	+43.465	11	8
9	52	(United Kingdom) James Toseland	Honda CBR1000RR	24	+44.258	7	7
10	31	(Australia) Karl Muggeridge	Honda CBR1000RR	24	+45.233	14	6
11	38	(Japan) Shinichi Nakatomi	Yamaha YZF-R1	24	+52.553	15	5
12	111	(Spain) Ruben Xaus	Ducati 999 F06	24	+1:01.959	6	4
13	96	(Czech Republic) Jakub Smrž	Ducati 999 F05	24	+1:17.989	17	3
14	99	(Australia) Steve Martin	Suzuki GSX-R1000 K6	24	+1:19.224	18	2
15	32	(France) Yoann Tiberio	Honda CBR1000RR	24	+1:36.627	19	1
16	36	(Czech Republic) Jiri Drazdak	Yamaha YZF-R1	24	+1:36.879	21	
Ret	42	(United Kingdom) Dean Ellison	Ducati 999RS	14	Retirement	22	
Ret	22	(Italy) Luca Morelli	Honda CBR1000RR	10	Retirement	20	
Ret	84	(Italy) Michel Fabrizio	Honda CBR1000RR	9	Retirement	12	
Ret	76	(Germany) Max Neukirchner	Suzuki GSX-R1000 K6	6	Retirement	9	
Ret	45	(Austria) Martin Bauer	Honda CBR1000RR	6	Retirement	13	

== Superbike race 2 classification ==
Pos	No	Rider	Bike	Laps	Time	Grid	Points
1	21	(Australia) Troy Bayliss	Ducati 999 F07	24	39:49.291	3	25
2	41	(Japan) Noriyuki Haga	Yamaha YZF-R1	24	+1.353	8	20
3	3	(Italy) Max Biaggi	Suzuki GSX-R1000 K7	24	+13.001	5	16
4	52	(United Kingdom) James Toseland	Honda CBR1000RR	24	+14.641	7	13
5	11	(Australia) Troy Corser	Yamaha YZF-R1	24	+15.210	4	11
6	111	(Spain) Ruben Xaus	Ducati 999 F06	24	+25.830	6	10
7	44	(Italy) Roberto Rolfo	Honda CBR1000RR	24	+29.752	10	9
8	10	(Spain) Fonsi Nieto	Kawasaki ZX-10R	24	+29.947	1	8
9	76	(Germany) Max Neukirchner	Suzuki GSX-R1000 K6	24	+30.552	9	7
10	31	(Australia) Karl Muggeridge	Honda CBR1000RR	24	+33.815	14	6
11	55	(France) Régis Laconi	Kawasaki ZX-10R	24	+39.323	2	5
12	57	(Italy) Lorenzo Lanzi	Ducati 999 F07	24	+42.592	11	4
13	84	(Italy) Michel Fabrizio	Honda CBR1000RR	24	+50.755	12	3
14	99	(Australia) Steve Martin	Suzuki GSX-R1000 K6	24	+53.598	18	2
15	38	(Japan) Shinichi Nakatomi	Yamaha YZF-R1	24	+56.284	15	1
16	96	(Czech Republic) Jakub Smrž	Ducati 999 F05	24	+57.818	17	
17	45	(Austria) Martin Bauer	Honda CBR1000RR	24	+1:18.407	13	
18	32	(France) Yoann Tiberio	Honda CBR1000RR	24	+1:32.030	19	
19	36	(Czech Republic) Jiri Drazdak	Yamaha YZF-R1	24	+1:36.702	21	
Ret	22	(Italy) Luca Morelli	Honda CBR1000RR	7	Retirement	20	
Ret	42	(United Kingdom) Dean Ellison	Ducati 999RS	2	Retirement	22	

== Supersport classification ==
Pos	Rider	Bike	Time/Retired	Laps	Points
1	(Australia) Broc Parkes	Yamaha YZF-R6	39'25.235	23	25
2	(Turkey) Kenan Sofuoğlu	Honda CBR600RR	39'27.222	23	20
3	(France) Matthieu Lagrive	Honda CBR600RR	39'48.670	23	16
4	(United Kingdom) Craig Jones	Honda CBR600RR	39'53.147	23	13
5	(United Kingdom) Tommy Hill	Yamaha YZF-R6	39'54.325	23	11
6	(Spain) David Checa	Yamaha YZF-R6	39'54.521	23	10
7	(Italy) Massimo Roccoli	Yamaha YZF-R6	39'54.534	23	9
8	(Spain) Joan Lascorz	Honda CBR600RR	39'57.349	23	8
9	(France) Sébastien Charpentier	Honda CBR600RR	40'04.445	23	7
10	(Netherlands) Barry Veneman	Suzuki GSX-R600	40'06.461	23	6
11	(Italy) Gianluca Nannelli	Ducati 749R	40'06.755	23	5
12	(France) Sébastien Gimbert	Yamaha YZF-R6	40'07.474	23	4
13	(Italy) Gianluca Vizziello	Yamaha YZF-R6	40'09.036	23	3
14	(Italy) Simone Sanna	Honda CBR600RR	40'18.284	23	2
15	(Germany) Stefan Nebel	Kawasaki ZX-6R	40'22.142	23	1
16	(Australia) Joshua Brookes	Honda CBR600RR	40'24.170	23	
17	(Spain) Pere Riba	Kawasaki ZX-6R	40'27.499	23	
18	(France) Gregory Leblanc	Honda CBR600RR	40'34.983	23	
19	(Spain) Arturo Tizon	Yamaha YZF-R6	40'36.435	23	
20	(Spain) David Salom	Yamaha YZF-R6	40'36.688	23	
21	(United Kingdom) Graeme Gowland	Honda CBR600RR	40'39.309	23	
22	(France) Julien Enjolras	Yamaha YZF-R6	40'49.108	23	
23	(Germany) Rigo Richter	Honda CBR600RR	40'50.501	23	
24	(Finland) Vesa Kallio	Suzuki GSX-R600	41'02.588	23	
25	(Sweden) Nicklas Cajback	Honda CBR600RR	39'41.405	22	
Ret	(Italy) Lorenzo Alfonsi	Honda CBR600RR	33'08.151	19	
Ret	(France) Fabien Foret	Kawasaki ZX-6R	28'09.236	16	
Ret	(Germany) Jesco Günther	Honda CBR600RR	24'11.444	13	
Ret	(Japan) Katsuaki Fujiwara	Honda CBR600RR	17'14.805	9	
Ret	(Portugal) Miguel Praia	Honda CBR600RR	11'09.613	6	
Ret	(Italy) Gilles Boccolini	Kawasaki ZX-6R	8'56.358	5	
Ret	(Italy) Mauro Sanchini	Honda CBR600RR	8'56.616	5	
Ret	(Spain) Javier Fores	Honda CBR600RR	9'16.580	5	
Ret	(Russia) Vladimir Ivanov	Yamaha YZF-R6	1'54.100	1	

== Superstock 1000 race classification ==
Pos	No	Rider	Bike	Laps	Time	Grid	Points
1	83	(Belgium) Didier Van Keymeulen	Yamaha YZF-R1	14	24:20.075	3	25
2	59	(Italy) Niccolò Canepa	Ducati 1098S	14	+0.194	1	20
3	71	(Italy) Claudio Corti	Yamaha YZF-R1	14	+0.527	2	16
4	3	(Australia) Mark Aitchison	Suzuki GSX-R1000 K6	14	+0.556	11	13
5	19	(Belgium) Xavier Simeon	Suzuki GSX-R1000 K6	14	+2.410	4	11
6	49	(Germany) Arne Tode	Honda CBR1000RR	14	+6.044	7	10
7	86	(Italy) Ayrton Badovini	MV Agusta F4 312 R	14	+9.485	6	9
8	15	(Italy) Matteo Baiocco	Yamaha YZF-R1	14	+9.658	15	8
9	57	(Italy) Ilario Dionisi	Suzuki GSX-R1000 K6	14	+11.106	5	7
10	25	(Germany) Dario Giuseppetti	Yamaha YZF-R1	14	+13.086	10	6
11	44	(Austria) René Mähr	Yamaha YZF-R1	14	+19.819	14	5
12	32	(South Africa) Sheridan Morais	Ducati 1098S	14	+20.115	16	4
13	96	(Czech Republic) Matěj Smrž	Honda CBR1000RR	14	+20.442	12	3
14	99	(Italy) Danilo Dell'Omo	MV Agusta F4 312 R	14	+27.882	13	2
15	33	(Estonia) Marko Rohtlaan	Honda CBR1000RR	14	+28.010	19	1
16	155	(Australia) Brendan Roberts	Ducati 1098S	14	+28.178	8	
17	23	(France) Cédric Tangre	Suzuki GSX-R1000 K6	14	+28.479	22	
18	34	(Hungary) Balázs Németh	Suzuki GSX-R1000 K6	14	+29.153	18	
19	56	(Switzerland) Daniel Sutter	Yamaha YZF-R1	14	+29.634	17	
20	10	(France) Franck Millet	MV Agusta F4 312 R	14	+38.680	23	
21	22	(Netherlands) Allard Kerkhoven	Yamaha YZF-R1	14	+40.881	28	
22	24	(Slovenia) Marko Jerman	Yamaha YZF-R1	14	+41.124	21	
23	75	(Slovenia) Luka Nedog	Ducati 1098S	14	+44.158	31	
24	42	(Germany) Leonardo Biliotti	MV Agusta F4 312 R	14	+44.166	24	
25	88	(Germany) Timo Gieseler	Yamaha YZF-R1	14	+44.508	29	
26	18	(United Kingdom) Matt Bond	Suzuki GSX-R1000 K6	14	+46.139	34	
27	134	(South Africa) Greg Gildenhuys	Ducati 1098S	14	+46.472	25	
28	13	(Hungary) Victor Kispataki	Suzuki GSX-R1000 K6	14	+57.652	30	
29	21	(Belgium) Wim Van Den Broeck	Yamaha YZF-R1	14	+1:06.831	35	
30	37	(Italy) Raffaele Filice	Suzuki GSX-R1000 K6	14	+1:08.869	36	
31	5	(Netherlands) Bram Appelo	Honda CBR1000RR	14	+1:13.804	32	
32	29	(Italy) Niccolò Rosso	MV Agusta F4 312 R	14	+1:21.970	37	
Ret	51	(Italy) Michele Pirro	Yamaha YZF-R1	10	Retirement	9	
Ret	58	(Italy) Robert Gianfardoni	Yamaha YZF-R1	10	Retirement	38	
Ret	14	(Italy) Lorenzo Baroni	Ducati 1098S	5	Retirement	33	
Ret	55	(Italy) Olivier Depoorter	Yamaha YZF-R1	4	Accident	27	
Ret	77	(United Kingdom) Barry Burrell	Honda CBR1000RR	4	Accident	20	
Ret	38	(Spain) Manuel Hernández	Yamaha YZF-R1	1	Retirement	26	
DNQ	16	(Netherlands) Raymond Schouten	Yamaha YZF-R1		Did not qualify		
DNQ	11	(Italy) Denis Sacchetti	MV Agusta F4 312 R		Did not qualify		

=== STK600 race classification ===
Pos.	No.	Rider	Bike	Laps	Time/Retired	Grid	Points
1	55	(Belgium) Vincent Lonbois	Suzuki GSX-R600	11	23:35.097	13	25
2	199	(United Kingdom) Gregg Black	Yamaha YZF-R6	11	+5.506	4	20
3	69	(Czech Republic) Ondřej Ježek	Kawasaki ZX-6R	11	+45.007	10	16
4	14	(South Africa) Dane Hellyer	Kawasaki ZX-6R	11	+46.247	25	13
5	4	(France) Mathieu Gines	Yamaha YZF-R6	11	+58.007	9	11
6	21	(France) Maxime Berger	Yamaha YZF-R6	11	+1:00.471	2	10
7	10	(United Kingdom) Leon Hunt	Honda CBR600RR	11	+1:02.387	22	9
8	28	(Spain) Yannick Guerra	Yamaha YZF-R6	11	+1:04.751	19	8
9	24	(Italy) Daniele Beretta	Suzuki GSX-R600	11	+1:08.785	7	7
10	8	(Italy) Andrea Antonelli	Honda CBR600RR	11	+1:35.456	6	6
11	91	(Sweden) Hampus Johansson	Yamaha YZF-R6	11	+1:41.049	27	5
12	119	(Italy) Michele Magnoni	Yamaha YZF-R6	11	+1:47.220	16	4
13	66	(Netherlands) Branko Srdanov	Yamaha YZF-R6	11	+1:48.535	30	3
14	47	(Italy) Eddi La Marra	Honda CBR600RR	11	+1:49.272	26	2
15	99	(Netherlands) Roy Ten Napel	Yamaha YZF-R6	11	+1:50.265	1	1
16	112	(Spain) Josep Pedró	Yamaha YZF-R6	11	+1:53.419	28	
17	34	(United Kingdom) Jay Dunn	Honda CBR600RR	10	+1 lap	18	
18	22	(Italy) Gabriele Poma	Yamaha YZF-R6	10	+1 lap	29	
DSQ	3	(Germany) Kevin Wahr	Yamaha YZF-R6	11	(+49.461)	8	
Ret	31	(Italy) Giuseppe Barone	Honda CBR600RR	9	Accident	20	
Ret	81	(Czech Republic) Patrik Vostárek	Honda CBR600RR	9	Retirement	3	
Ret	44	(United Kingdom) Gino Rea	Suzuki GSX-R600	8	Accident	24	
Ret	25	(Australia) Ryan Taylor	Kawasaki ZX-6R	7	Accident	32	
Ret	43	(Italy) Daniele Rossi	Honda CBR600RR	7	Accident	14	
Ret	57	(Denmark) Kenny Tirsgaard	Suzuki GSX-R600	7	Accident	23	
Ret	111	(Czech Republic) Michal Šembera	Honda CBR600RR	6	Accident	15	
Ret	27	(South Africa) Chris Leeson	Suzuki GSX-R600	6	Retirement	12	
Ret	7	(Italy) Renato Costantini	Honda CBR600RR	5	Accident	11	
Ret	114	(Belgium) Nicolas Pirot	Yamaha YZF-R6	3	Accident	31	
Ret	30	(Switzerland) Michaël Savary	Yamaha YZF-R6	1	Accident	5	
Ret	48	(Russia) Vladimir Leonov	Yamaha YZF-R6	1	Accident	17	
Ret	20	(France) Sylvain Barrier	Yamaha YZF-R6	0	Accident	21	
DNS	2	(Switzerland) Christian Von Gunten	Suzuki GSX-R600		Did not start		
WD	35	(Bulgaria) Radostin Todorov	Yamaha YZF-R6		Withdrew		
