= Arturo Tizón =

Spanish motorcycle racer (1984–2021)

- Nationality: Spanish
- Born: 25 May 1984; La Vall d'Uixó, Spain
- Died: 16 January 2021 (aged 36); Alcudia de Veo, Spain
Motorcycle racing career statistics
250cc World Championship
Active years	2005–2007
Manufacturers	Honda, Aprilia
Championships	0
2007 championship position	24th (1 pt)
Starts / Wins / Podiums / Poles / F. laps / Points; 23 / 0 / 0 / 0 / 0 / 12
Supersport World Championship
Active years	2005, 2007–2008
Manufacturers	Yamaha, Suzuki
Championships	0
2008 championship position	NC (0 pts)
Starts / Wins / Podiums / Poles / F. laps / Points; 7 / 0 / 0 / 0 / 0 / 2

Arturo Tizón Ibáñez (25 May 1984 – 16 January 2021) was a Spanish motorcycle racer. He was born in La Vall d'Uixó, Valencian Community. From 2005 to 2007, he competed in the 250cc Motorcycle World championship. He was the CEV Supersport champion in 2005.

== Career statistics ==
=== Supersport World Championship ===
==== Races by year ====
(key)

Year	Bike	1	2	3	4	5	6	7	8	9	10	11	12	13	Pos.	Pts
2005	Yamaha	QAT	AUS	SPA; 14	ITA	EUR	SMR	CZE	GBR	NED	GER	ITA	FRA		40th	2
2007	Yamaha	QAT	AUS	EUR	SPA	NED	ITA	GBR	SMR	CZE; 19	GBR; 22	GER; 19	ITA; 20	FRA; Ret	NC	0
2008	Suzuki	QAT	AUS	SPA	NED	ITA	GER	SMR	CZE	GBR	EUR	ITA	FRA	POR; Ret	NC	0

=== Grand Prix motorcycle racing ===
==== By season ====
Season	Class	Moto	Team	Races	Win	Podiums	Pole	Pts	Position
2005	250cc	Honda	Würth Honda BQR	3	0	0	0	0	NC
2006	250cc	Honda	Würth Honda BQR	16	0	0	0	11	23rd
2007	250cc	Aprilia	Blusens Aprilia Germany	6	0	0	0	1	30th
Total				25	0	0	0	12	

==== Races by year ====
(key)

Year	Class	Bike	1	2	3	4	5	6	7	8	9	10	11	12	13	14	15	16	17	Pos.	Pts
2005	250cc	Honda	SPA	POR	CHN	FRA	ITA	CAT	NED	GBR	GER	CZE	JPN	MAL	QAT	AUS; 19	TUR; 18	VAL; Ret		NC	0
2006	250cc	Honda	SPA; 12	QAT; Ret	TUR; Ret	CHN; 19	FRA; 16	ITA; 14	CAT; 14	NED; 14	GBR; 17	GER; Ret	CZE; 15	MAL; Ret	AUS; Ret	JPN; 21	POR; 20	VAL; 18		23rd	11
2007	250cc	Aprilia	QAT; Ret	SPA; Ret	TUR; Ret	CHN; 15	FRA; 17	ITA; 23	CAT; DNS	GBR	NED	GER	CZE	RSM	POR	JPN	AUS	MAL	VAL	30th	1

Sporting positions
Preceded by Martín Cárdenas	Spanish Supersport champion 2005	Succeeded by David Salom
