= Vallelunga Superbike World Championship round =

Vallelunga Superbike World Championship round or Valle Lunga Superbike World Championship round may refer to:

- 2007 Vallelunga Superbike World Championship round
- 2008 Vallelunga Superbike World Championship round

== See also ==
- Vallelunga Circuit
