= 2008 FIM Superstock 1000 Cup =

2008 FIM Superstock 1000 Cup
Previous:	2007	Next:	2009
Support series: Superbike World Championship; Supersport World Championship; European Superstock 600 Championship

The 2008 FIM Superstock 1000 Cup was the tenth season of the FIM Superstock 1000 championship, the fourth held under this name. The FIM Superstock 1000 championship followed the same calendar as the Superbike World Championship, missing out the none European rounds of the championship minus the round at Vallelunga.

The title was won by Aussie Brendan Roberts who beat closes title rival Maxime Berger by just 7 points.

== Race calendar and results ==
2008 Calendar
Round	Date	Round	Circuit	Pole position	Fastest lap	Race winner	Winning team	Report
1	6 April	Spain	Valencia	(Australia) Brendan Roberts	(Australia) Brendan Roberts	(Australia) Brendan Roberts	Ducati Xerox Junior Team	Report
2	27 April	Netherlands	Assen	(Italy) Claudio Corti	(Italy) Michele Pirro	(France) Maxime Berger	Hannspree IDS Ten Kate Honda	Report
3	11 May	Italy	Monza	(Italy) Claudio Corti	(Czech Republic) Matěj Smrž	(Belgium) Xavier Simeon	Team Alstare Suzuki	Report
4	15 June	Germany	Nürburgring	(Australia) Brendan Roberts	(Australia) Brendan Roberts	(Australia) Brendan Roberts	Ducati Xerox Junior Team	Report
5	29 June	San Marino	Misano	(Italy) Michele Pirro	(Italy) Alessandro Polita	(Italy) Alessandro Polita	Sterilgarda Go Eleven	Report
6	20 July	Czech Republic	Brno Circuit	(Australia) Brendan Roberts	(France) Maxime Berger	(France) Maxime Berger	Hannspre IDS Ten Kate Honda	Report
7	3 August	(United Kingdom) Great Britain	Brands Hatch	(France) Maxime Berger	(South Africa) Sheridan Morais	(France) Maxime Berger	Hannspre IDS Ten Kate Honda	Report
8	7 September	(European Union) Europe	Donington Park	(Belgium) Xavier Simeon	(Belgium) Xavier Simeon	(Belgium) Xavier Simeon	Team Alstare Suzuki	Report
9	5 October	France	Magny-Cours	(Czech Republic) Matěj Smrž	(Czech Republic) Matěj Smrž	(Czech Republic) Matěj Smrž	MS Racing	Report
10	2 November	Portugal	Portimão	(Australia) Brendan Roberts	(Australia) Brendan Roberts	(Australia) Brendan Roberts	Ducati Xerox Junior Team	Report

== Entry list ==
Team	Constructor	Motorcycle	No.	Rider	Rounds
Ducati Xerox Junior Team	Ducati	Ducati 1098R	89	(Italy) Domenico Colucci	All
Ducati Xerox Junior Team	Ducati	Ducati 1098R	155	(Australia) Brendan Roberts	All
Fabricom - MCT Racing	Ducati	Ducati 1098R	67	(Netherlands) Ronald Ter Braake	2
Guandalini Racing by Grifo's	Ducati	Ducati 1098R	117	(Italy) Denis Sacchetti	1–5
R.G. Team	Ducati	Ducati 1098R	58	(Italy) Robert Gianfardoni	1–5, 7–9
Sterilgarda Go Eleven	Ducati	Ducati 1098R	53	(Italy) Alessandro Polita	All
Althea Racing AX-52	Honda	Honda CBR1000RR	8	(Italy) Andrea Antonelli	1–9
Azione Corse	Honda	Honda CBR1000RR	33	(Estonia) Marko Rohtlaan	1–4
Azione Corse	Honda	Honda CBR1000RR	63	(Sweden) Per Björk	6
Azione Corse	Honda	Honda CBR1000RR	107	(Italy) Niccolò Rosso	7–10
Hannspre IDS Ten Kate Honda	Honda	Honda CBR1000RR	21	(France) Maxime Berger	All
Intermoto Czech	Honda	Honda CBR1000RR	90	(Czech Republic) Michal Drobný	All
MD Team Jerman	Honda	Honda CBR1000RR	24	(Slovenia) Marko Jerman	All
MD Team Jerman	Honda	Honda CBR1000RR	92	(Slovenia) Jure Stibilj	All
MS Racing	Honda	Honda CBR1000RR	69	(Czech Republic) Ondrej Ježek	10
MS Racing	Honda	Honda CBR1000RR	77	(United Kingdom) Barry Burrell	All
MS Racing	Honda	Honda CBR1000RR	96	(Czech Republic) Matěj Smrž	All
Team Honda Merson	Honda	Honda CBR1000RR	72	(Spain) Jordi Torres	1
Orelac Racing by Galvin Team	Kawasaki	Kawasaki ZX 10R	996	(Italy) Jonathan Gallina	1–6
O Six Kawasaki Supported	Kawasaki	Kawasaki ZX 10R	15	(Italy) Matteo Baiocco	All
O Six Kawasaki Supported	Kawasaki	Kawasaki ZX 10R	57	(Australia) Cameron Stronach	1–9
Team Pedercini	Kawasaki	Kawasaki ZX 10R	12	(Italy) Alessio Aldrovadi	1–8
Team Pedercini	Kawasaki	Kawasaki ZX 10R	13	(Italy) Vittorio Bortone	10
Team Pedercini	Kawasaki	Kawasaki ZX 10R	113	(South Africa) Sheridan Morais	7–8
Team Pedercini	Kawasaki	Kawasaki ZX 10R	113	(South Africa) Sheridan Morais	10
Team Pedercini	Kawasaki	Kawasaki ZX 10R	132	(France) Yoann Tiberio	1–9
KTM Mähr Superstock	KTM	KTM 1190 RC8	7	(Austria) René Mähr	All
KTM Mähr Superstock	KTM	KTM 1190 RC8	81	(Finland) Pauli Pekkanen	6–10
VB Squadra Corse	KTM	KTM 1190 RC8	32	(Italy) Lorenzo Baroni	5
Boselli Racing	Suzuki	Suzuki GSX-R1000 K8	73	(Italy) Simone Saltarelli	10
BWIN Racing	Suzuki	Suzuki GSX-R1000 K8	98	(Germany) Oliver Skach	4
Celani Team Suzuki Italia	Suzuki	Suzuki GSX-R1000 K8	17	(Italy) Cristiano Todaro	3
Celani Team Suzuki Italia	Suzuki	Suzuki GSX-R1000 K8	23	(Australia) Chris Seaton	All
Celani Team Suzuki Italia	Suzuki	Suzuki GSX-R1000 K8	29	(Italy) Davide Bastianelli	1–2
Celani Team Suzuki Italia	Suzuki	Suzuki GSX-R1000 K8	154	(Italy) Tommaso Lorenzetti	4–10
Coutelle Junior Team Suzuki	Suzuki	Suzuki GSX-R1000 K8	30	(Switzerland) Michaël Savary	All
Coutelle Junior Team Suzuki	Suzuki	Suzuki GSX-R1000 K8	78	(France) Freddy Foray	All
Cruciani Moto Suzuki Italia	Suzuki	Suzuki GSX-R1000 K8	26	(Italy) Andrea Liberini	9–10
Cruciani Moto Suzuki Italia	Suzuki	Suzuki GSX-R1000 K8	34	(Italy) Davide Giugliano	All
Cruciani Moto Suzuki Italia	Suzuki	Suzuki GSX-R1000 K8	84	(Italy) Federico Pica	6
Cruciani Moto Suzuki Italia	Suzuki	Suzuki GSX-R1000 K8	111	(Italy) Fabrizio Perotti	1–5
MIST Suzuki Racing	Suzuki	Suzuki GSX-R1000 K8	18	(United Kingdom) Matt Bond	All
MIST Suzuki Racing	Suzuki	Suzuki GSX-R1000 K8	87	(Australia) Gareth Jones	All
MQP Racing Team	Suzuki	Suzuki GSX-R1000 K8	5	(Netherlands) Danny De Boer	All
MQP Racing Team	Suzuki	Suzuki GSX-R1000 K8	99	(Netherlands) Roy Ten Napel	All
MTM Racing Team	Suzuki	Suzuki GSX-R1000 K8	14	(Sweden) Filip Backlund	All
Suzuki International Europe	Suzuki	Suzuki GSX-R1000 K8	35	(Germany) Dominic Lammert	4, 6
Team Alstare Suzuki	Suzuki	Suzuki GSX-R1000 K8	19	(Belgium) Xavier Simeon	All
Devil Yamaha France	Yamaha	Yamaha YZF-R1	56	(France) Loïc Napoleone	9
LW RT Powered by Szkopek	Yamaha	Yamaha YZF-R1	120	(Poland) Marcin Walkowiak	6
Moto Performances	Yamaha	Yamaha YZF-R1	74	(France) Julien Millet	9–10
Motor's Dream Trasimeno	Yamaha	Yamaha YZF-R1	8	(Italy) Andrea Antonelli	10
OKI Szkopek Team	Yamaha	Yamaha YZF-R1	91	(Poland) Marek Szkopek	6
Orelac Racing by Galvin Team	Yamaha	Yamaha YZF-R1	11	(Spain) Javier Oliver	9–10
PCP Peko Racing Team	Yamaha	Yamaha YZF-R1	41	(Switzerland) Gregory Junod	All
Raceways Yamaha	Yamaha	Yamaha YZF-R1	10	(United Kingdom) Jon Kirkham	7–8
RCGM Team	Yamaha	Yamaha YZF-R1	45	(Italy) Luca Verdini	3, 5
Ultimate Racing	Yamaha	Yamaha YZF-R1	60	(United Kingdom) Peter Hickman	7–10
Vd Heyden Motors Yamaha	Yamaha	Yamaha YZF-R1	16	(Netherlands) Raymond Schouten	1–9
Vd Heyden Motors Yamaha	Yamaha	Yamaha YZF-R1	86	(Netherlands) Lennart Van Houwelingen	10
Yamaha Lorenzini by Leoni	Yamaha	Yamaha YZF-R1	51	(Italy) Michele Pirro	All
Yamaha Lorenzini by Leoni	Yamaha	Yamaha YZF-R1	119	(Italy) Michele Magnoni	All
Yamaha Motor Italia J.T.	Yamaha	Yamaha YZF-R1	71	(Italy) Claudio Corti	All
YZF Yamaha Junior Team	Yamaha	Yamaha YZF-R1	20	(France) Sylvain Barrier	1–6, 9–10
YZF Yamaha Junior Team	Yamaha	Yamaha YZF-R1	82	(France) Franck Millet	8
Zone Rouge	Yamaha	Yamaha YZF-R1	66	(Netherlands) Branko Srdanov	All
Zone Rouge	Yamaha	Yamaha YZF-R1	88	(France) Kenny Foray	All

Key
Regular rider
Wildcard rider
Replacement rider

- All entries used Pirelli tyres.

== Championship standings ==
=== Riders' standings ===
Pos.	Rider	Bike	SPA (Spain)	NED (Netherlands)	ITA (Italy)	GER (Germany)	SMR (San Marino)	CZE (Czech Republic)	GBR (United Kingdom)	EU (European Union)	FRA (France)	POR (Portugal)	Pts
1	(Australia) Brendan Roberts	Ducati	**1**	Ret	4	**1**	4	**2**	4	4	20	**1**	147
2	(France) Maxime Berger	Honda	7	1	Ret	7	3	1	**1**	6	11	3	140
3	(Italy) Alessandro Polita	Ducati	4	4	3	16	1	3	5	2	4	6	137
4	(Belgium) Xavier Simeon	Suzuki	3	3	1	3	5	5	DNS	**1**	5	11	136
5	(Italy) Michele Pirro	Yamaha	6	2	Ret	4	**2**	6	6	19	10	4	102
6	(Czech Republic) Matěj Smrž	Honda	Ret	7	2	5	Ret	8	Ret	Ret	**1**	5	84
7	(Italy) Davide Giugliano	Suzuki	2	8	Ret	2	20	9	Ret	3	15	Ret	72
8	(France) Freddy Foray	Suzuki	12	Ret	7	8	8	20	10	26	2	9	62
9	(Australia) Chris Seaton	Suzuki	8	24	Ret	11	9	7	9	Ret	12	2	60
10	(Italy) Andrea Antonelli	Honda	20	5	12	13	6	4	3	Ret	18		57
10	(Italy) Andrea Antonelli	Yamaha										DSQ	57
11	(Italy) Claudio Corti	Yamaha	5	**Ret**	**Ret**	6	12	Ret	8	Ret	3	8	57
12	(United Kingdom) Barry Burrell	Honda	9	Ret	Ret	12	13	15	7	9	14	10	39
13	(France) Kenny Foray	Yamaha	13	9	8	17	10	16	23	Ret	8	16	32
14	(Italy) Michele Magnoni	Yamaha	10	Ret	5	9	Ret	10	21	Ret	Ret	Ret	30
15	(Italy) Domenico Colucci	Ducati	Ret	11	Ret	25	7	12	DNS	11	13	Ret	26
16	(France) Sylvain Barrier	Yamaha	14	Ret	Ret	Ret	14	DNS			7	7	22
17	(South Africa) Sheridan Morais	Kawasaki							2	Ret		15	21
18	(Australia) Gareth Jones	Suzuki	31	14	9	14	16	11	11	Ret	17	22	21
19	(Switzerland) Michaël Savary	Suzuki	19	Ret	10	15	Ret	17	12	Ret	9	24	18
20	(Italy) Matteo Baiocco	Kawasaki	17	12	Ret	18	15	13	Ret	7	Ret	Ret	17
21	(Netherlands) Raymond Schouten	Yamaha	16	6	Ret	Ret	18	14	16	12	16		16
22	(Italy) Fabrizio Perotti	Suzuki	11	17	6	Ret	Ret						15
23	(France) Julien Millet	Yamaha									6	13	13
24	(Sweden) Filip Backlund	Suzuki	18	22	13	19	22	29	19	8	19	14	13
25	(United Kingdom) Jon Kirkham	Yamaha							DNS	5			11
26	(France) Yoann Tiberio	Kawasaki	15	15	Ret	10	17	Ret	15	20	Ret		9
27	(Estonia) Marko Rohtlaan	Honda	24	10	Ret	Ret							6
28	(Slovenia) Jure Stibilj	Honda	Ret	Ret	19	34	30	25	20	10	27	28	6
29	(Netherlands) Danny De Boer	Suzuki	21	13	Ret	30	23	23	28	13	31	20	6
30	(Italy) Alessio Aldrovandi	Kawasaki	Ret	23	11	20	19	28	24	21			5
31	(Italy) Luca Verdini	Yamaha			Ret		11						5
32	(Italy) Simone Saltarelli	Suzuki										12	4
33	(Austria) René Mähr	KTM	Ret	16	Ret	33	25	19	13	Ret	Ret	17	3
34	(Switzerland) Gregory Junod	Yamaha	29	18	14	21	DNS	21	26	15	26	31	3
35	(Finland) Pauli Pekkanen	KTM						22	14	Ret	22	30	2
36	(Italy) Niccolò Rosso	Honda							Ret	14	25	25	2
37	(Italy) Jonathan Gallina	Ducati	23	25	15	Ret	DNS	Ret					1
	(Netherlands) Roy Ten Napel	Suzuki	27	Ret	16	28	26	21	Ret	23	29	29	0
	(United Kingdom) Peter Hickman	Yamaha							17	16	21	Ret	0
	(Czech Republic) Michal Drobný	Honda	30	Ret	17	27	29	Ret	DNS	Ret	33	27	0
	(Netherlands) Branko Srdanov	Yamaha	Ret	26	18	32	28	NC	18	Ret	32	21	0
	(France) Franck Millet	Yamaha								18			0
	(United Kingdom) Matt Bond	Suzuki	22	21	Ret	23	24	18	22	DNQ	23	23	0
	(Italy) Tommaso Lorenzetti	Suzuki				29	Ret	Ret	Ret	18	28	32	0
	(Czech Republic) Ondrej Ježek	Honda										18	0
	(Italy) Denis Sacchetti	Ducati	26	19	22	24	21						0
	(Slovenia) Marko Jerman	Honda	25	28	Ret	26	27	27	27	22	24	19	0
	(Italy) Robert Gianfardoni	Ducati	33	29	20	DNQ	Ret		25	25	DNQ		0
	(Australia) Cameron Stronach	Kawasaki	32	27	21	31	Ret	Ret	29	24	34		0
	(Germany) Oliver Skach	Suzuki				22							0
	(Netherlands) Lennart Van Houwelingen	Yamaha										26	0
	(Italy) Davide Bastianelli	Suzuki	28	Ret									0
	(Poland) Marcin Walkowiak	Yamaha						29					0
	(Poland) Marek Szkopek	Yamaha						30					0
	(Italy) Andrea Liberini	Suzuki									30	Ret	0
	(Italy) Lorenzo Baroni	KTM					31						0
	(Italy) Vittorio Bortone	Kawasaki										33	0
	(Spain) Javier Oliver	Yamaha									35	Ret	0
	(Spain) Jordi Torres	Honda	Ret										0
	(Italy) Cristiano Todaro	Suzuki			Ret								0
	(Germany) Dominic Lammert	Suzuki				Ret		DNS					0
	(Italy) Federico Pica	Suzuki						Ret					0
	(Sweden) Per Björk	Honda						Ret					0
	(France) Loïc Napoleone	Yamaha									Ret		0
Pos.	Rider	Bike	SPA (Spain)	NED (Netherlands)	ITA (Italy)	GER (Germany)	SMR (San Marino)	CZE (Czech Republic)	GBR (United Kingdom)	EU (European Union)	FRA (France)	POR (Portugal)	Pts

Colour	Result
Gold	Winner
Silver	Second place
Bronze	Third place
Green	Points classification
Blue	Non-points classification
Blue	Non-classified finish (NC)
Purple	Retired, not classified (Ret)
Red	Did not qualify (DNQ)
Red	Did not pre-qualify (DNPQ)
Black	Disqualified (DSQ)
White	Did not start (DNS)
White	Withdrew (WD)
White	Race cancelled (C)
Blank	Did not practice (DNP)
Blank	Did not arrive (DNA)
Blank	Excluded (EX)

**Bold** – Pole position
Italics – Fastest lap

=== Manufacturers' standings ===
Pos.	Manufacturers.	SPA (Spain)	NED (Netherlands)	ITA (Italy)	GER (Germany)	SMR (San Marino)	CZE (Czech Republic)	GBR (United Kingdom)	EU (European Union)	FRA (France)	POR (Portugal)	Pts
1	(Italy) Ducati	1	4	3	1	1	2	4	2	4	1	195
2	(Japan) Honda	7	1	2	5	3	1	1	6	1	3	182
3	(Japan) Suzuki	2	3	1	2	5	5	9	1	2	2	175
4	(Japan) Yamaha	5	2	5	4	2	6	6	5	3	4	135
5	(Japan) Kawasaki	15	12	11	10	15	13	2	7	34	15	50
6	(Austria) KTM	Ret	16	Ret	33	25	19	13	Ret	22	17	3
Pos.	Manufacturers.	SPA (Spain)	NED (Netherlands)	ITA (Italy)	GER (Germany)	SMR (San Marino)	CZE (Czech Republic)	GBR (United Kingdom)	EU (European Union)	FRA (France)	POR (Portugal)	Pts
