= 2005 European Superstock 600 Championship =

Motorcycle racing series

2005 European Superstock 600 Championship
Previous:	none	Next:	2006
Support series: Superbike World Championship; Supersport World Championship; FIM Superstock 1000 Cup

The 2005 European Superstock 600 Championship was the inaugural season of the European Superstock 600 Championship. The European Superstock 600 Championship was a support class to the Superbike World Championship at the European rounds. The championship used 600 cc production motorcycles and was reserved for riders between 15 and 24 years of age. Same rules as FIM Superstock 1000 Cup applied, but the series was organized by FIM Europe. The season was contested over ten races, beginning at Circuit Ricardo Tormo on 23 April and ending at Circuit de Nevers Magny-Cours on 8 October. Claudio Corti clinched the title becoming the first ever European Superstock 600 Championship champion after beating closest rival Yoann Tiberio.

== Race calendar and results ==
2005 Calendar
Round	Date	Round	Circuit	Pole position	Fastest lap	Race winner	Winning team
1	23 April	Spain	Circuit Ricardo Tormo	(Belgium) Xavier Simeon	(Italy) Claudio Corti	(France) Yoann Tiberio	Junior Team Megabike
2	7 May	Italy	Autodromo Nazionale Monza	(France) Yoann Tiberio	(Italy) Claudio Corti	(Italy) Claudio Corti	Trasimeno
3	28 May	Europe	Silverstone Circuit	(Italy) Claudio Corti	(France) Maxime Berger	(Italy) Claudio Corti	Trasimeno
4	25 June	San Marino	Misano Adriatico	(France) Yoann Tiberio	(Italy) Claudio Corti	(Italy) Claudio Corti	Trasimeno
5	16 July	Czech Republic	Brno Circuit	(France) Yoann Tiberio	(France) Yoann Tiberio	(France) Yoann Tiberio	Junior Team Megabike
6	6 August	(United Kingdom) Great Britain	Brands Hatch	(France) Yoann Tiberio	(France) Yoann Tiberio	(Italy) Claudio Corti	Trasimeno
7	3 September	Netherlands	TT Circuit Assen	(Italy) Claudio Corti	(France) Yoann Tiberio	(Italy) Claudio Corti	Trasimeno
8	10 September	Germany	Lausitzring	(Italy) Niccolò Canepa	(France) Yoann Tiberio	(France) Maxime Berger	MBE
9	1 October	Italy	Autodromo Enzo e Dino Ferrari	(Italy) Niccolò Canepa	(France) Maxime Berger	(France) Yoann Tiberio	Junior Team Megabike
10	8 October	France	Circuit de Nevers Magny-Cours	(Italy) Niccolò Canepa	(Italy) Niccolò Canepa	(France) Yoann Tiberio	Junior Team Megabike

== Entry list ==
Team	Constructor	Motorcycle	No.	Rider	Rounds
Ajo Promotion	Honda	Honda CBR600RR	37	(Finland) Henry Taipale	All
Alapont Competition	Honda	Honda CBR600RR	16	(Spain) Agostin Perez Muñoz	All
Alapont Competition	Honda	Honda CBR600RR	68	(Spain) Garcia Forner	1–9
Alapont Competition	Honda	Honda CBR600RR	99	(Spain) Jorge Villar	All
Hidalva Team	Honda	Honda CBR600RR	86	(Spain) Javier Hidalgo	1, 3–4
Junior Team Megabike	Honda	Honda CBR600RR	32	(France) Yoann Tiberio	All
Junior Team Megabike	Honda	Honda CBR600RR	96	(Italy) Jonathan Gallina	1–6, 8–9
Lorini Racing; Team Lorini	Honda	Honda CBR600RR	72	(Italy) Alessandro Colatosti	4
Lorini Racing; Team Lorini	Honda	Honda CBR600RR	76	(Italy) Tommaso Lorenzetti	9
MBE	Honda	Honda CBR600RR	21	(France) Maxime Berger	All
Moto91	Honda	Honda CBR600RR	83	(France) Franck Pavoine	10
Moto Sport Racing	Honda	Honda CBR600RR	64	(Spain) Dani Rivas	All
MS akuna Racing	Honda	Honda CBR600RR	27	(United Kingdom) Barry Burrell	All
Proton Group	Honda	Honda CBR600RR	91	(Sweden) Alexander Lundh	5, 7–8, 10
Remar Racing Ten Kate Honda Junior; Remar Racing	Honda	Honda CBR600RR	22	(Netherlands) Danny De Boer	All
Remar Racing Ten Kate Honda Junior; Remar Racing	Honda	Honda CBR600RR	43	(Netherlands) Wesley Van Nieuwenhuizen	7
Speedy Bike Racing Team	Honda	Honda CBR600RR	66	(Italy) Davide Giugliano	9
Team Bovee	Honda	Honda CBR600RR	47	(Netherlands) Leon Bovee	7–8, 10
Ten Kate Kobutex Honda	Honda	Honda CBR600RR	11	(Netherlands) Ronald Ter Braake	All
Ten Kate Kobutex Honda	Honda	Honda CBR600RR	12	(Netherlands) Roy Ten Napel	All
Up Racing	Honda	Honda CBR600RR	82	(France) Franck Millet	10
DBG Racing	Kawasaki	Kawasaki ZX-6RR	24	(Italy) Daniele Beretta	All
Kawasaki Bertocchi	Kawasaki	Kawasaki ZX-6RR	59	(Italy) Niccolò Canepa	All
Lightspeed Kawasaki	Kawasaki	Kawasaki ZX-6RR	55	(France) Loïc Napoleone	1, 3–10
Lightspeed Kawasaki	Kawasaki	Kawasaki ZX-6RR	88	(Italy) Andrea Antonelli	All
SBP Racing	Kawasaki	Kawasaki ZX-6RR	13	(Italy) Gabriele Perri	All
Team Erinac	Kawasaki	Kawasaki ZX-6RR	69	(Czech Republic) Ondřej Ježek	4–10
Alstare Suzuki Corona Extra	Suzuki	Suzuki GSX-R600R	19	(Belgium) Xavier Simeon	All
Beowulf Motorsport.com	Suzuki	Suzuki GSX-R600R	31	(United Kingdom) Patrick McDougall	All
Berclaz Racing Team	Suzuki	Suzuki GSX-R600R	81	(Switzerland) Gabriel Berclaz	9–10
Celina Team - Suzuki Italia	Suzuki	Suzuki GSX-R600R	51	(Italy) Alessia Polita	All
Colucci; M.C. Matera Corse	Suzuki	Suzuki GSX-R600R	79	(Italy) Domenico Colucci	4–7, 9–10
Faster Racing	Suzuki	Suzuki GSX-R600R	65	(Hungary) Gergő Talmácsi	2
Grandys Junior Racing; Szkopek Racing	Suzuki	Suzuki GSX-R600R	33	(Poland) Marek Szkopek	All
Herman Verboven Racing	Suzuki	Suzuki GSX-R600R	26	(Belgium) Tom Van Looy	All
Moto 1	Suzuki	Suzuki GSX-R600R	39	(United States) Nicky Wimbauer	All
Team Some Racing	Suzuki	Suzuki GSX-R600R	44	(Netherlands) Lennart Van Houwelingen	7
Team Suzuki Nederland	Suzuki	Suzuki GSX-R600R	45	(Netherlands) Nigel Walraven	7
Team Suzuki Nederland	Suzuki	Suzuki GSX-R600R	46	(Netherlands) Virgil Amber Bloemhard	7
Titano Corse	Suzuki	Suzuki GSX-R600R	58	(Italy) Luca Verdini	1
Titano Corse	Suzuki	Suzuki GSX-R600R	77	(Czech Republic) Marketa Janakova	1
TKR Racing	Suzuki	Suzuki GSX-R600R	56	(Switzerland) Gregory Junod	8–9
44 Racing Team	Yamaha	Yamaha YZF-R6	80	(Italy) Simone Piermaria	9
Bike Service	Yamaha	Yamaha YZF-R6	70	(Italy) Luca Pelliccioni	2, 4
Bike Service	Yamaha	Yamaha YZF-R6	84	(Italy) Jarno Colosio	9
Cipriani	Yamaha	Yamaha YZF-R6	78	(Italy) Claudio Di Stefano	4
DFXtreme Majestic	Yamaha	Yamaha YZF-R6	73	(Poland) Andrzej Chmielewski	All
Fei Racing Team	Yamaha	Yamaha YZF-R6	74	(Italy) Michele Magnoni	4
Hidalva Team	Yamaha	Yamaha YZF-R6	53	(Spain) Jordi Almeida	6
Lionel Braun Racing	Yamaha	Yamaha YZF-R6	85	(France) Lionel Braun	10
MS Yamaha	Yamaha	Yamaha YZF-R6	15	(Spain) David Del Moral	1–2
Riot Racing	Yamaha	Yamaha YZF-R6	92	(United Kingdom) Chris Northover	6–10
Riot Racing	Yamaha	Yamaha YZF-R6	93	(United Kingdom) Mark Talbot	6
Start Racing	Yamaha	Yamaha YZF-R6	76	(Italy) Tommaso Lorenzetti	4
Trasimeno	Yamaha	Yamaha YZF-R6	71	(Italy) Claudio Corti	All
WLB Racing	Yamaha	Yamaha YZF-R6	41	(Italy) Davide Caldart	All
WLB Racing	Yamaha	Yamaha YZF-R6	77	(Czech Republic) Marketa Janakova	3–6, 8
Yamaha Racing Support	Yamaha	Yamaha YZF-R6	42	(Netherlands) Marcel Van Nieuwenhuizen	7
Zone Rouge	Yamaha	Yamaha YZF-R6	14	(Belgium) Nicolas Pirot	All

Key
Regular rider
Wildcard rider
Replacement rider

- All entries used Pirelli tyres.

== Championship' standings ==
=== Riders' standings ===
Pos	Rider	Bike	VAL (Spain)	MNZ (Italy)	SIL (Europe)	MIS (San Marino)	BRN (Czech Republic)	BRA (United Kingdom)	ASS (Netherlands)	LAU (Germany)	IMO (Italy)	MAG (France)	Pts
1	(Italy) Claudio Corti	Yamaha	2	1	**1**	1	3	1	**1**	9	5	9	188
2	(France) Yoann Tiberio	Honda	1	**2**	2	**2**	**1**	**Ret**	Ret	2	1	1	180
3	(France) Maxime Berger	Honda	6	3	3	DSQ	Ret	3	14	1	2	3	121
4	(Italy) Niccolò Canepa	Kawasaki	4	4	4	10	2	2	Ret	**Ret**	**Ret**	**2**	105
5	(Belgium) Xavier Simeon	Suzuki	**3**	5	Ret	Ret	Ret	4	4	3	4	4	95
6	(Italy) Andrea Antonelli	Kawasaki	Ret	DNS	5	4	Ret	5	3	4	3	5	90
7	(Spain) Dani Rivas	Honda	17	10	20	8	6	9	6	11	10	10	58
8	(Spain) Garcia Forner	Honda	Ret	Ret	7	14	4	12	2	Ret	11		53
9	(France) Loïc Napoleone	Kawasaki	DNS		5	Ret	WD	11	8	7	6	Ret	43
10	(Czech Republic) Ondřej Ježek	Kawasaki					8	10	9	5	9	16	39
11	(Poland) Andrzej Chmielewski	Yamaha	10	8	16	Ret	7	Ret	10	10	Ret	12	39
12	(Spain) Agostin Perez Muñoz	Honda	5	6	8	Ret	Ret	16	15	17	16	20	30
13	(Finland) Henry Taipale	Honda	11	Ret	9	16	5	23	Ret	16	19	9	30
14	(Italy) Domenico Colucci	Suzuki				6	18	14	WD		7	8	29
15	(United States) Nicky Wimbauer	Suzuki	8	23	13	12	14	6	DNS	Ret	DNS	14	29
16	(Netherlands) Danny De Boer	Honda	DNS	11	17	25	12	15	7	8	Ret	Ret	27
17	(United Kingdom) Patrick McDougall	Suzuki	Ret	9	10	20	16	7	11	Ret	Ret	25	27
18	(Spain) Jorge Villar	Honda	Ret	12	14	15	13	8	13	Ret	13	13	27
19	(Italy) Tommaso Lorenzetti	Yamaha				5							19
19	(Italy) Tommaso Lorenzetti	Honda									8		19
20	(Netherlands) Ronald Ter Braake	Honda	19	16	11	13	Ret	Ret	5	20	17	Ret	19
21	(Italy) Daniele Beretta	Kawasaki	9	Ret	Ret	22	9	21	21	15	12	Ret	19
22	(Spain) Javier Hidalgo	Honda	7		12	11							18
23	(Italy) Jonathan Gallina	Honda	Ret	7	15	Ret	10	Ret		14	18		18
24	(Netherlands) Roy Ten Napel	Honda	DNQ	15	Ret	24	11	18	Ret	6	Ret	15	17
25	(Italy) Alessandro Colatosti	Honda				3							16
26	(Belgium) Tom Van Looy	Suzuki	14	18	Ret	21	15	13	Ret	22	DNS	11	11
27	(France) Franck Millet	Honda										6	10
28	(Italy) Claudio Di Stefano	Yamaha				7							9
29	(United Kingdom) Barry Burrell	Honda	13	Ret	18	23	17	22	Ret	13	14	Ret	8
30	(Italy) Michele Magnoni	Yamaha				9							7
31	(Italy) Alessia Polita	Suzuki	12	17	Ret	18	23	24	18	19	25	22	4
32	(Netherlands) Leon Bovee	Honda							12	21		18	4
33	(Sweden) Alexander Lundh	Honda					19		20	12		DNS	4
34	(Italy) Luca Pelliccioni	Yamaha		13		17							3
35	(Italy) Gabriele Perri	Kawasaki	16	14	19	Ret	22	17	Ret	Ret	23	DNS	2
36	(Italy) Davide Caldart	Yamaha	15	20	21	28	24	Ret	22	23	22	23	1
37	(Italy) Simone Piermaria	Yamaha									15		1
	(Netherlands) Marcel Van Nieuwenhuizen	Yamaha							16				0
	(Netherlands) Virgil Amber Bloemhard	Suzuki							17				0
	(France) Lionel Braun	Yamaha										17	0
	(Poland) Marek Szkopek	Suzuki	18	21	Ret	26	21	19	Ret	24	21	Ret	0
	(Switzerland) Gregory Junod	Suzuki								18	Ret		0
	(Hungary) Gergő Talmácsi	Suzuki		19									0
	(Netherlands) Wesley Van Nieuwenhuizen	Honda							19				0
	(United Kingdom) Chris Northover	Yamaha						26	23	Ret	24	19	0
	(Belgium) Nicolas Pirot	Yamaha	20	22	22	27	25	Ret	25	25	Ret	26	0
	(Czech Republic) Marketa Janakova	Suzuki	DNA										0
	(Czech Republic) Marketa Janakova	Yamaha			WD	29	20	20		26			0
	(Italy) Jarno Colosio	Yamaha									20		0
	(France) Franck Pavoine	Honda										21	0
	(Netherlands) Nigel Walraven	Suzuki							24				0
	(Switzerland) Gabriel Berclaz	Suzuki									26	24	0
	(United Kingdom) Mark Talbot	Yamaha						25					0
	(Netherlands) Lennart Van Houwelingen	Suzuki							Ret				0
	(Spain) Jordi Almeida	Yamaha						DSQ					0
	(Italy) Davide Giugliano	Honda									DSQ		0
	(Spain) David Del Moral	Yamaha	DNA	DNA									
	(Italy) Luca Verdini	Suzuki	DNA										
Pos	Rider	Bike	VAL (Spain)	MNZ (Italy)	SIL (Europe)	MIS (San Marino)	BRN (Czech Republic)	BRA (United Kingdom)	ASS (Netherlands)	LAU (Germany)	IMO (Italy)	MAG (France)	Pts

Colour	Result
Gold	Winner
Silver	Second place
Bronze	Third place
Green	Points classification
Blue	Non-points classification
Blue	Non-classified finish (NC)
Purple	Retired, not classified (Ret)
Red	Did not qualify (DNQ)
Red	Did not pre-qualify (DNPQ)
Black	Disqualified (DSQ)
White	Did not start (DNS)
White	Withdrew (WD)
White	Race cancelled (C)
Blank	Did not practice (DNP)
Blank	Did not arrive (DNA)
Blank	Excluded (EX)

**Bold** – Pole position
Italics – Fastest lap
Source :
