= Manuel Hernández (motorcyclist) =

Spanish motorcycle racer

- Born: 24 August 1984 (age 42); Cartagena, Spain
Motorcycle racing career statistics
125cc World Championship
Active years	2004-2006
Manufacturers	Honda, Aprilia
Championships	0
Starts / Wins / Podiums / Poles / F. laps / Points; 30 / 0 / 0 / 0 / 0 / 0

Manuel Hernández García (born 24 August 1984 in Cartagena, Spain) is a Spanish motorcycle road racer. He currently races in the 250cc Grand Prix world championship. He started to race professionally in 2004. His father, also named Manuel Hernández, raced in the same category in the late 1980s.

== Career statistics ==
- 2007 - NC, FIM Superstock 1000 Cup, Yamaha YZF-R1

=== Grand Prix motorcycle racing career ===
Season	Class	Moto	Races	Win	Podiums	Pole	Pts	Position
2004	125cc	Aprilia	5	0	0	0	-	-
2005	125cc	Honda	16	0	0	0	12	24th
2006	125cc	Honda	9	0	0	0	2	24th
2008	250cc	Aprilia	7	0	0	0	5	23rd
Total			**37**	**0**	**0**	**0**	**19**	

=== FIM Superstock 1000 Cup ===
==== Races by year ====
(key) (Races in bold indicate pole position) (Races in italics indicate fastest lap)

Year	Bike	1	2	3	4	5	6	7	8	9	10	11	Pos	Pts
2007	Yamaha	DON	VAL	NED	MNZ	SIL	SMR	BRN	BRA	LAU; Ret	ITA; 20	MAG	NC	0
