= Tommaso Lorenzetti =

Italian motorcycle racer

- Nationality: Italian
- Born: 22 June 1985 (age 41); Foligno, Italy
- Current team: Sonic Pro Race
- Bike number: 154
Motorcycle racing career statistics
Moto2 World Championship
Active years	2011
Manufacturers	FTR
Starts / Wins / Podiums / Poles / F. laps / Points; 3 / 0 / 0 / 0 / 0 / 0

Tommaso Lorenzetti (born 22 June 1985) is an Italian motorcycle racer and maxillofacial surgeon.

== Career statistics ==
- 2005 - 19th, European Superstock 600 Championship, Yamaha YZF-R6, Honda CBR600RR
- 2006 - NC, FIM Superstock 1000 Cup, Honda CBR1000RR
- 2007 - NC, FIM Superstock 1000 Cup, Kawasaki ZX-10R
- 2008 - NC, FIM Superstock 1000 Cup, Suzuki

=== European Superstock 600 ===
==== Races by year ====
(key) (Races in bold indicate pole position, races in italics indicate fastest lap)

Year	Bike	1	2	3	4	5	6	7	8	9	10	Pos	Pts
2005	Yamaha/Honda	VAL	MNZ	SIL	MIS; 5	BRN	BRA	ASS	LAU	IMO; 8	MAG	19th	19

=== FIM Superstock 1000 Cup ===
==== Races by year ====
(key) (Races in bold indicate pole position) (Races in italics indicate fastest lap)

Year	Bike	1	2	3	4	5	6	7	8	9	10	11	Pos	Pts
2006	Honda	VAL	MNZ	SIL	SMR; Ret	BRN; Ret	BRA	NED	LAU	IMO	MAG		NC	0
2007	Kawasaki	DON	VAL	NED	MNZ; 23	SIL	SMR	BRN	BRA	LAU	ITA	MAG	24th	8
2008	Suzuki	VAL	NED	MNZ	NŰR; 29	SMR; Ret	BRN; Ret	BRA; Ret	DON; 18	MAG; 28	ALG; 32		24th	8

=== Grand Prix motorcycle racing ===
==== By season ====
Season	Class	Motorcycle	Team	Number	Race	Win	Podium	Pole	FLap	Pts	Plcd
2011	Moto2	FTR	Aeroport de Castello	24	3	0	0	0	0	0	NC
Total					**3**	**0**	**0**	**0**	**0**	**0**	

==== Races by year ====
Year	Class	Bike	1	2	3	4	5	6	7	8	9	10	11	12	13	14	15	16	17	Pos.	Points
2011	Moto2	FTR	QAT	SPA	POR	FRA	CAT	GBR	NED	ITA; Ret	GER; 29	CZE; Ret	INP	RSM	ARA	JPN	AUS	MAL	VAL	NC	0
