= Luca Verdini =

Italian motorcycle racer

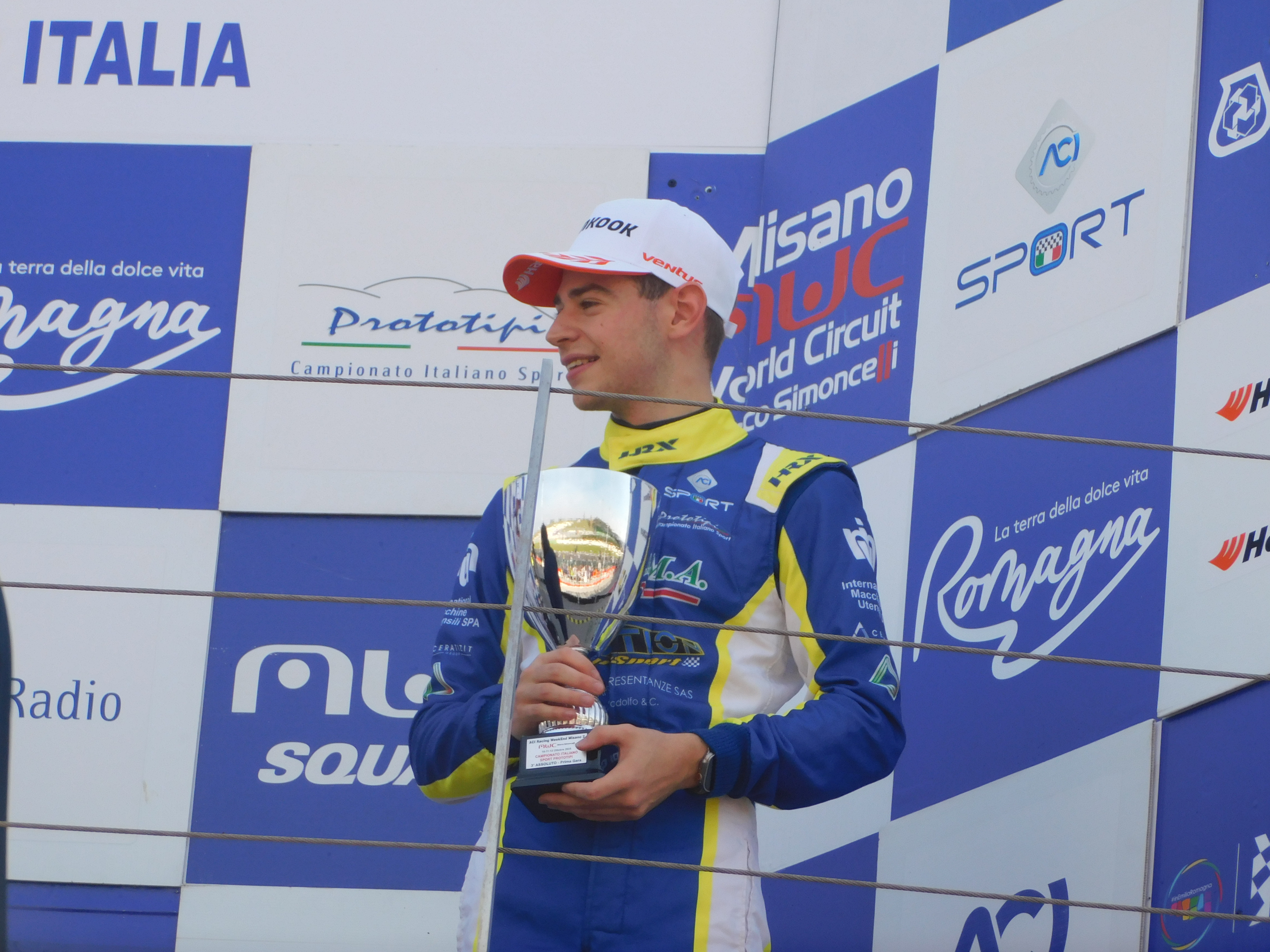
- Nationality: Italian
- Born: 18 February 1985 (age 41); Pesaro, Italy
Motorcycle racing career statistics
125cc World Championship
Active years	2005–2006
Manufacturers	Aprilia
Championships	0
2006 championship position	NC (0 pts)
Starts / Wins / Podiums / Poles / F. laps / Points; 2 / 0 / 0 / 0 / 0 / 0

Luca Verdini (born 18 February 1985 in Pesaro) is an Italian motorcycle racer.

== Career statistics ==
- 2005 - NC, European Superstock 600 Championship, Suzuki GSX-R600RR
- 2007 - 29th, FIM Superstock 1000 Cup, Yamaha YZF-R1
- 2008 - 31st, FIM Superstock 1000 Cup, Yamaha YZF-R1
- 2009 - 24th, FIM Superstock 1000 Cup, Honda CBR1000RR, Yamaha YZF-R1
- 2011 - 18th, FIM Superstock 1000 Cup, Honda CBR1000RR, Kawasaki ZX-10R

=== CIV Championship (Campionato Italiano Velocita) ===
==== Races by year ====
(key) (Races in bold indicate pole position; races in italics indicate fastest lap)

Year	Class	Bike	1	2	3	4	5	6	Pos	Pts
2004	125cc	Aprilia	MUG; Ret	IMO	VAL1; 10	MIS; 26	VAL2; 17		23rd	6
2005	125cc	Aprilia	VAL; Ret	MON; 10	IMO; 7	MIS1; Ret	MUG; 4	MIS2; 13	9th	31

=== European Superstock 600 ===
==== Races by year ====
(key) (Races in bold indicate pole position, races in italics indicate fastest lap)

Year	Bike	1	2	3	4	5	6	7	8	9	10	Pos	Pts
2005	Suzuki	VAL; DNA	MNZ	SIL	MIS	BRN	BRA	ASS	LAU	IMO	MAG	NC	0

=== Grand Prix motorcycle racing ===
==== By season ====
Season	Class	Motorcycle	Team	Race	Win	Podium	Pole	FLap	Pts	Plcd
2005	125cc	Aprilia	RCGM Team FMI	1	0	0	0	0	0	NC
2006	125cc	Aprilia	RCGM Team	1	0	0	0	0	0	NC
Total				**2**	**0**	**0**	**0**	**0**	**0**	

==== Races by year ====
(key)

Year	Class	Bike	1	2	3	4	5	6	7	8	9	10	11	12	13	14	15	16	Pos.	Pts
2005	125cc	Aprilia	SPA	POR	CHN	FRA	ITA; 29	CAT	NED	GBR	GER	CZE	JPN	MAL	QAT	AUS	TUR	VAL	NC	0
2006	125cc	Aprilia	SPA	QAT	TUR	CHN	FRA	ITA; 22	CAT	NED	GBR	GER	CZE	MAL	AUS	JPN	POR	VAL	NC	0

=== FIM Superstock 1000 Cup ===
==== Races by year ====
(key) (Races in bold indicate pole position) (Races in italics indicate fastest lap)

Year	Bike	1	2	3	4	5	6	7	8	9	10	Pos	Pts
2008	Yamaha	VAL	NED	MNZ; Ret	NŰR	SMR; 11	BRN	BRA	DON	MAG	ALG	31st	8
2009	Honda/Yamaha	VAL	NED	MNZ; 7	SMR; Ret	DON; 24	BRN	NŰR	IMO	MAG	ALG	24th	9
