= Raymond Schouten =

Dutch motorcycle racer

- Nationality: Dutch
- Born: 15 March 1985 (age 41); Waardhuizen, Netherlands
Motorcycle racing career statistics
250cc World Championship
Active years	2006
Manufacturers	Honda
Starts / Wins / Podiums / Poles / F. laps / Points; 1 / 0 / 0 / 0 / 0 / 0
125cc World Championship
Active years	2002–2005
Manufacturers	Honda
Starts / Wins / Podiums / Poles / F. laps / Points; 27 / 0 / 0 / 0 / 0 / 0

Raymond Schouten (born 15 March 1985) is a Dutch motorcycle racer. He won the Dutch Superstock 600 Championship in 2007, and the Dutch Supersport Championship in 2010.

Schouten has also competed in the Dutch ONK 125cc Championship (where he was the runner-up in 2002), the Dutch ONK 250cc Championship, the Superstock 1000 FIM Cup, the Dutch ONK Superbike Championship – where he was the runner-up in 2009 and 2011 – and the Endurance World Cup.

== Career statistics ==
- 2007 - 25th, FIM Superstock 1000 Cup, Yamaha YZF-R1
- 2008 - 21st, FIM Superstock 1000 Cup, Yamaha YZF-R1
- 2009 - 16th, FIM Superstock 1000 Cup, Yamaha YZF-R1

=== Grand Prix motorcycle racing ===
==== By season ====
Season	Class	Motorcycle	Team	Race	Win	Podium	Pole	FLap	Pts	Plcd
2002	125cc	Honda	DeGraaf Junior Team	1	0	0	0	0	0	NC
2003	125cc	Honda	Schouten Racing	1	0	0	0	0	0	NC
2004	125cc	Honda	Molenaar Racing	15	0	0	0	0	0	NC
2005	125cc	Honda	Arie Molenaar Racing	10	0	0	0	0	0	NC
2006	250cc	Honda	Amici Racing	1	0	0	0	0	0	NC
Total				**28**	**0**	**0**	**0**	**0**	**0**	

==== Races by year ====
(key)

Year	Class	Bike	1	2	3	4	5	6	7	8	9	10	11	12	13	14	15	16	Pos.	Pts
2002	125cc	Honda	JPN	RSA	SPA	FRA	ITA	CAT	NED; Ret	GBR	GER	CZE	POR	BRA	PAC	MAL	AUS	VAL	NC	0
2003	125cc	Honda	JPN	RSA	SPA	FRA	ITA	CAT	NED; Ret	GBR	GER	CZE	POR	BRA	PAC	MAL	AUS	VAL	NC	0
2004	125cc	Honda	RSA; Ret	SPA; 20	FRA; 28	ITA; Ret	CAT	NED; 22	BRA; 24	GER; Ret	GBR; Ret	CZE; 26	POR; 21	JPN; 20	QAT; 24	MAL; 19	AUS; 26	VAL; Ret	NC	0
2005	125cc	Honda	SPA; 23	POR; 30	CHN; 19	FRA; 24	ITA; 26	CAT; 25	NED; Ret	GBR; 16	GER; Ret	CZE; Ret	JPN	MAL	QAT	AUS	TUR	VAL	NC	0
2006	250cc	Honda	SPA	QAT	TUR	CHN	FRA	ITA	CAT	NED; 20	GBR	GER	CZE	MAL	AUS	JPN	POR	VAL	NC	0

=== FIM Superstock 1000 Cup ===
==== Races by year ====
(key) (Races in bold indicate pole position) (Races in italics indicate fastest lap)

Year	Bike	1	2	3	4	5	6	7	8	9	10	11	Pos	Pts
2007	Yamaha	DON; 18	VAL; 27	NED; 11	MNZ; 21	SIL; 21	SMR; 17	BRN; 16	BRA; 17	LAU; DNQ	ITA; 21	MAG; Ret	25th	5
2008	Yamaha	VAL; 16	NED; 6	MNZ; Ret	NŰR; Ret	SMR; 18	BRN; 14	BRA; 16	DON; 12	MAG; 16	ALG		24th	8
2009	Yamaha	VAL; 19	NED; 10	MNZ; NC	SMR; Ret	DON; 8	BRN; Ret	NŰR; DSQ	IMO; 17	MAG; 8	ALG; DNS		16th	22

=== British Supersport Championship ===
==== Races by year ====
(key) (Races in bold indicate pole position, races in italics indicate fastest lap)

Year	Bike	1		2		3		4		5		6		7		8		9		10		11		12		Pos	Pts
Year	Bike	R1	R2	R1	R2	R1	R2	R1	R2	R1	R2	R1	R2	R1	R2	R1	R2	R1	R2	R1	R2	R1	R2	R1	R2	Pos	Pts
2012	Yamaha	BHI	BHI	THR	THR	OUL	OUL	SNE	SNE	KNO	KNO	OUL	OUL	BHGP	BHGP	CAD	CAD	DON	DON	ASS; 5	ASS; 4	SIL	SIL	BHGP	BHGP	24th	24
