= Lorenzo Baroni =

Italian motorcycle racer

- Nationality: Italian
- Born: 23 February 1990 (age 36); Lugo, Italy
Motorcycle racing career statistics
125cc World Championship
Active years	2005–2006
Manufacturers	Aprilia, Honda
Starts / Wins / Podiums / Poles / F. laps / Points; 11 / 0 / 0 / 0 / 0 / 0

Lorenzo Baroni (born 23 February 1990) is an Italian motorcycle racer. He also became a journalist for La Gazzetta dello Sport.

== Career statistics ==
- 2007 - 26th, FIM Superstock 1000 Cup, Ducati
- 2008 - NC, FIM Superstock 1000 Cup, KTM 1190 RC8
- 2009 - 18th, FIM Superstock 1000 Cup, Yamaha YZF-R1
- 2010 - 10th, FIM Superstock 1000 Cup, Ducati
- 2011 - 7th, FIM Superstock 1000 Cup, Ducati
- 2012 - 10th, FIM Superstock 1000 Cup, BMW S1000RR

=== CIV Championship (Campionato Italiano Velocita) ===
==== Races by year ====
(key) (Races in bold indicate pole position; races in italics indicate fastest lap)

Year	Class	Bike	1	2	3	4	5	6	Pos	Pts
2004	125cc	Aprilia	MUG; 11	IMO; 12	VAL1; 7	MIS; 7	VAL2; 11		6th	32
2005	125cc	Aprilia	VAL; 1	**MON**; 2	**IMO**; 1	MIS1; 4	**MUG**; 25	**MIS2**; 3	2nd	99

=== Grand Prix motorcycle racing ===
==== By season ====
Season	Class	Motorcycle	Team	Race	Win	Podium	Pole	FLap	Pts	Plcd
2005	125cc	Aprilia	RCGM Team FMI	1	0	0	0	0	0	NC
2006	125cc	Honda	Humangest Racing Team	10	0	0	0	0	0	NC
Total				**11**	**0**	**0**	**0**	**0**	**0**	

==== Races by year ====
(key)

Year	Class	Bike	1	2	3	4	5	6	7	8	9	10	11	12	13	14	15	16	Pos.	Pts
2005	125cc	Aprilia	SPA	POR	CHN	FRA	ITA; 24	CAT	NED	GBR	GER	CZE	JPN	MAL	QAT	AUS	TUR	VAL	NC	0
2006	125cc	Honda	SPA; 22	QAT; 30	TUR; 28	CHN; Ret	FRA; 19	ITA; Ret	CAT; 25	NED; 24	GBR; 27	GER; 29	CZE	MAL	AUS	JPN	POR	VAL	NC	0

=== FIM Superstock 1000 Cup ===
==== Races by year ====
(key) (Races in bold indicate pole position) (Races in italics indicate fastest lap)

Year	Bike	1	2	3	4	5	6	7	8	9	10	11	Pos	Pts
2007	Yamaha	DON	VAL	NED	MNZ; Ret	SIL	SMR	BRN	BRA	LAU	ITA; 12	MAG	24th	4
2008	KTM	VAL	NED	MNZ	NŰR	SMR; 31	BRN	BRA	DON	MAG	ALG		NC	0
2009	Yamaha	VAL	NED	MNZ	SMR	DON	BRN; 21	NŰR; 10	IMO; 7	MAG; Ret	ALG; 17		18th	15
2010	Ducati	ALG; Ret	VAL; 10	NED; 9	MNZ; 7	SMR; Ret	BRN; 5	SIL; Ret	NŰR; Ret	IMO; 6	MAG; 5		10th	54
2011	Ducati	NED; 4	MNZ; Ret	SMR; 12	ARA; 9	BRN; 7	SIL; 4	NŰR; 5	IMO; 4	MAG; Ret	ALG; 12		7th	74
2012	BMW	IMO; 15	NED; 5	MNZ; 8	SMR; 2	ARA; 3	BRN; Ret	SIL; DNS	NŰR	ALG	MAG		10th	56
