= Matteo Baiocco =

Italian motorcycle racer

- Nationality: Italian
- Born: 23 April 1984 (age 42); Osimo, Italy
- Current team: Nuova M2 Racing
- Bike number: 1
Motorcycle racing career statistics
Superbike World Championship
Active years	2009–2012, 2014–2016
Manufacturers	Kawasaki, Ducati
2016 championship position	22nd (12 pts)
Starts / Wins / Podiums / Poles / F. laps / Points; 89 / 0 / 0 / 0 / 0 / 189
Supersport World Championship
Active years	2003–2005
Manufacturers	Yamaha, Kawasaki
Starts / Wins / Podiums / Poles / F. laps / Points; 17 / 0 / 0 / 0 / 0 / 23

Matteo Baiocco (born 23 April 1984) is an Italian motorcycle racer. He was the CIV Superbike champion in 2011, 2012 and 2016. In 2017, he competed in the CIV Superbike Championship aboard an Aprilia RSV4.

== Career statistics ==
- 2006 - 5th, FIM Superstock 1000 Cup, Yamaha YZF-R1
- 2008 - 20th, FIM Superstock 1000 Cup, Kawasaki

=== CIV 125cc Championship ===
==== Races by year ====
(key) (Races in bold indicate pole position; races in italics indicate fastest lap)

Year	Bike	1	2	3	4	5	Pos	Pts
2001	Aprilia	MIS1; 9	MON; 16	VAL	MIS2	MIS3	21st	7

=== CIV Championship (Campionato Italiano Velocita) ===
==== Races by year ====
(key) (Races in bold indicate pole position; races in italics indicate fastest lap)

Year	Class	Bike	1	2	3	4	5	6	Pos	Pts
2002	Supersport	Yamaha	IMO; Ret	VAL; 11	MUG; Ret	MIS1; 17	MIS2; 15		24th	6
2003	Supersport	Yamaha	MIS1; 9	MUG1; 5	MIS1; 8	MUG2; 5	VAL; Ret		10th	37
2004	Supersport	Yamaha	MUG; 9	IMO; Ret	VAL1; Ret	MIS; 10	VAL2; 6		12th	23
2005	Supersport	Kawasaki/Yamaha	VAL; 13	MON; 7	IMO; 9	MIS1	MUG; 20	MIS2; 13	12th	22

=== Supersport World Championship ===
==== Races by year ====
Year	Team	1	2	3	4	5	6	7	8	9	10	11	12	Pos.	Pts
2003	Yamaha	SPA	AUS	JPN	ITA	GER	GBR	SMR; 16	GBR	NED	ITA	FRA		NC	0
2004	Yamaha	SPA; 13	AUS; Ret	SMR; Ret	ITA; Ret	GER; 17	GBR; 13	GBR; 16	NED; 15	ITA; 9	FRA; 10			17th	20
2005	Kawasaki	QAT; 14	AUS; Ret	SPA; Ret	ITA; 15	EUR; DNS	SMR; Ret	CZE	GBR	NED	GER			39th	3
2005	Yamaha											ITA; Ret	FRA	39th	3

=== FIM Superstock 1000 Cup ===
==== Races by year ====
(key) (Races in bold indicate pole position) (Races in italics indicate fastest lap)

Year	Bike	1	2	3	4	5	6	7	8	9	10	11	Pos	Pts
2006	Yamaha	VAL; 11	MNZ; 9	SIL; 9	SMR; 12	BRN; 4	BRA; 14	NED; 4	LAU; 7	IMO; 6	MAG; 3		5th	86
2007	Yamaha	DON; 5	VAL; 4	NED; 5	MNZ; 1	SIL; 6	SMR; 1	BRN; 2	BRA; 4	LAU; 8	ITA; 6	MAG; 9	3rd	153
2008	Yamaha	VAL; 16	NED; 6	MNZ; Ret	NŰR; Ret	SMR; 18	BRN; 14	BRA; 16	DON; 12	MAG; 16	ALG		21st	16

=== Superbike World Championship ===
==== Races by year ====
Year	Make	1		2		3		4		5		6		7		8		9		10		11		12		13		14		Pos.	Pts
Year	Make	R1	R2	R1	R2	R1	R2	R1	R2	R1	R2	R1	R2	R1	R2	R1	R2	R1	R2	R1	R2	R1	R2	R1	R2	R1	R2	R1	R2	Pos.	Pts
2009	Kawasaki	AUS; Ret	AUS; 24	QAT; 19	QAT; 22	SPA; 20	SPA; Ret	NED; Ret	NED; 14	ITA; 17	ITA; 15	RSA	RSA	USA	USA	SMR; Ret	SMR; Ret	GBR	GBR	CZE	CZE									24th	17
2009	Ducati																					GER; Ret	GER; 16	ITA; 14	ITA; 16	FRA; 12	FRA; 14	POR; 10	POR; Ret	24th	17
2010	Kawasaki	AUS; 17	AUS; Ret	POR; 19	POR; 18	SPA; 17	SPA; 20	NED; 18	NED; 15	ITA; DSQ	ITA; Ret	RSA; Ret	RSA; 20	USA; 18	USA; Ret	SMR; 19	SMR; 19	CZE; 15	CZE; 15	GBR; Ret	GBR; 20	GER; 14	GER; 17	ITA; 18	ITA; 15	FRA; 15	FRA; 14			23rd	9
2011	Ducati	AUS	AUS	EUR	EUR	NED	NED	ITA	ITA	USA	USA	SMR; 12	SMR; Ret	SPA	SPA	CZE; Ret	CZE; Ret	GBR	GBR	GER	GER	ITA; 16	ITA; Ret	FRA	FRA	POR	POR			29th	4
2012	Ducati	AUS	AUS	ITA	ITA	NED	NED	ITA	ITA	EUR	EUR	USA	USA	SMR; 15	SMR; 10	SPA	SPA	CZE	CZE	GBR	GBR	RUS	RUS	GER	GER	POR; 15	POR; Ret	FRA	FRA	28th	8
2014	Ducati	AUS	AUS	SPA	SPA	NED	NED	ITA	ITA	GBR	GBR	MAL	MAL	ITA; Ret	ITA; DNS	POR	POR	USA	USA	SPA	SPA	FRA	FRA	QAT	QAT					NC	0
2015	Ducati	AUS; 11	AUS; 9	THA; 6	THA; 8	SPA; 12	SPA; 11	NED; 12	NED; 11	ITA; 8	ITA; 6	GBR; Ret	GBR; 10	POR; 6	POR; 10	ITA; 15	ITA; Ret	USA; Ret	USA; 13	MAL; 8	MAL; 9	SPA; 8	SPA; 6	FRA; 7	FRA; 11	QAT; DNS	QAT; DNS			9th	139
2016	Ducati	AUS	AUS	THA; 13	THA; 13	SPA; Ret	SPA; 17	NED; 14	NED; Ret	ITA; 12	ITA; Ret	MAL	MAL	GBR	GBR	ITA	ITA	USA	USA	GER	GER	FRA	FRA	SPA	SPA	QAT	QAT			22nd	12

=== British Superbike Championship ===
==== By year ====
Year	Make	1		2		3			4		5		6			7			8			9			10		11		12			Pos	Pts
Year	Make	R1	R2	R1	R2	R1	R2	R3	R1	R2	R1	R2	R1	R2	R3	R1	R2	R3	R1	R2	R3	R1	R2	R3	R1	R2	R1	R2	R1	R2	R3	Pos	Pts
2012	Ducati	BHI	BHI	THR	THR	OUL	OUL	OUL	SNE	SNE	KNO	KNO	OUL	OUL	OUL	BHGP	BHGP		CAD	CAD		DON	DON		ASS	ASS	SIL; Ret	SIL; Ret	BHGP	BHGP	BHGP	NC	0

Year	Make	1			2			3			4			5			6			7			8			9			10			11			12			Pos	Pts
Year	Make	R1	R2	R3	R1	R2	R3	R1	R2	R3	R1	R2	R3	R1	R2	R3	R1	R2	R3	R1	R2	R3	R1	R2	R3	R1	R2	R3	R1	R2	R3	R1	R2	R3	R1	R2	R3	Pos	Pts
2013	Ducati	BHI; 14	BHI; 15		THR; Ret	THR; Ret		OUL; 17	OUL; 14		KNO; 14	KNO; 11		SNE; 10	SNE; 10		BHGP; Ret	BHGP; 14		OUL; 15	OUL; 13	OUL; 16	CAD; 18	CAD; 15		DON; 19	DON; 17		ASS; 13	ASS; Ret		SIL; 9	SIL; 8		BHGP; 17	BHGP; 13	BHGP; 15	17th	53

=== Suzuka 8 Hours results ===
Year	Team	Riders	Bike	Pos
2025	(Japan) Team Tatara Aprilia	(Italy) Matteo Baiocco (Japan) Ruka Wada (Japan) Maiku Watanuki	Aprilia RSV4	45th
