= Jeremy Crowe =

Australian motorcycle racer

- Nationality: Australian
- Born: 24 July 1985 (age 41); Condobolin, Australia
Motorcycle racing career statistics
125cc World Championship
Active years	2002
Manufacturers	Honda
Starts / Wins / Podiums / Poles / F. laps / Points; 1 / 0 / 0 / 0 / 0 / 0
Supersport World Championship
Active years	2008
Manufacturers	Yamaha
Starts / Wins / Podiums / Poles / F. laps / Points; 2 / 0 / 0 / 0 / 0 / 1

Jeremy Crowe (born 24 July 1985) is an Australian motorcycle racer.

== Career statistics ==
=== Grand Prix motorcycle racing ===
==== By season ====
Season	Class	Motorcycle	Race	Win	Podium	Pole	FLap	Pts	Plcd
2002	125cc	Honda	1	0	0	0	0	0	NC
Total			1	0	0	0	0	0	

==== Races by year ====
(key)

Year	Class	Bike	1	2	3	4	5	6	7	8	9	10	11	12	13	14	15	16	Pos.	Pts
2002	125cc	Honda	JPN	RSA	SPA	FRA	ITA	CAT	NED	GBR	GER	CZE	POR	BRA	PAC	MAL	AUS; Ret	VAL	NC	0

=== Supersport World Championship ===
==== Races by year ====
(key)

Year	Bike	1	2	3	4	5	6	7	8	9	10	11	12	13	Pos.	Pts
2008	Yamaha	QAT	AUS	SPA	NED	ITA	GER; 15	SMR	CZE	GBR	EUR; DNQ	ITA; 24	FRA	POR	40th	1
