= 2008 Nürburgring Superbike World Championship round =

(Germany) 2008 Nürburgring Superbike World Championship round
Round details
- Round 7 of 14 rounds in the 2008 Superbike World Championship. and Round 6 of 13 rounds in the 2008 Supersport World Championship.
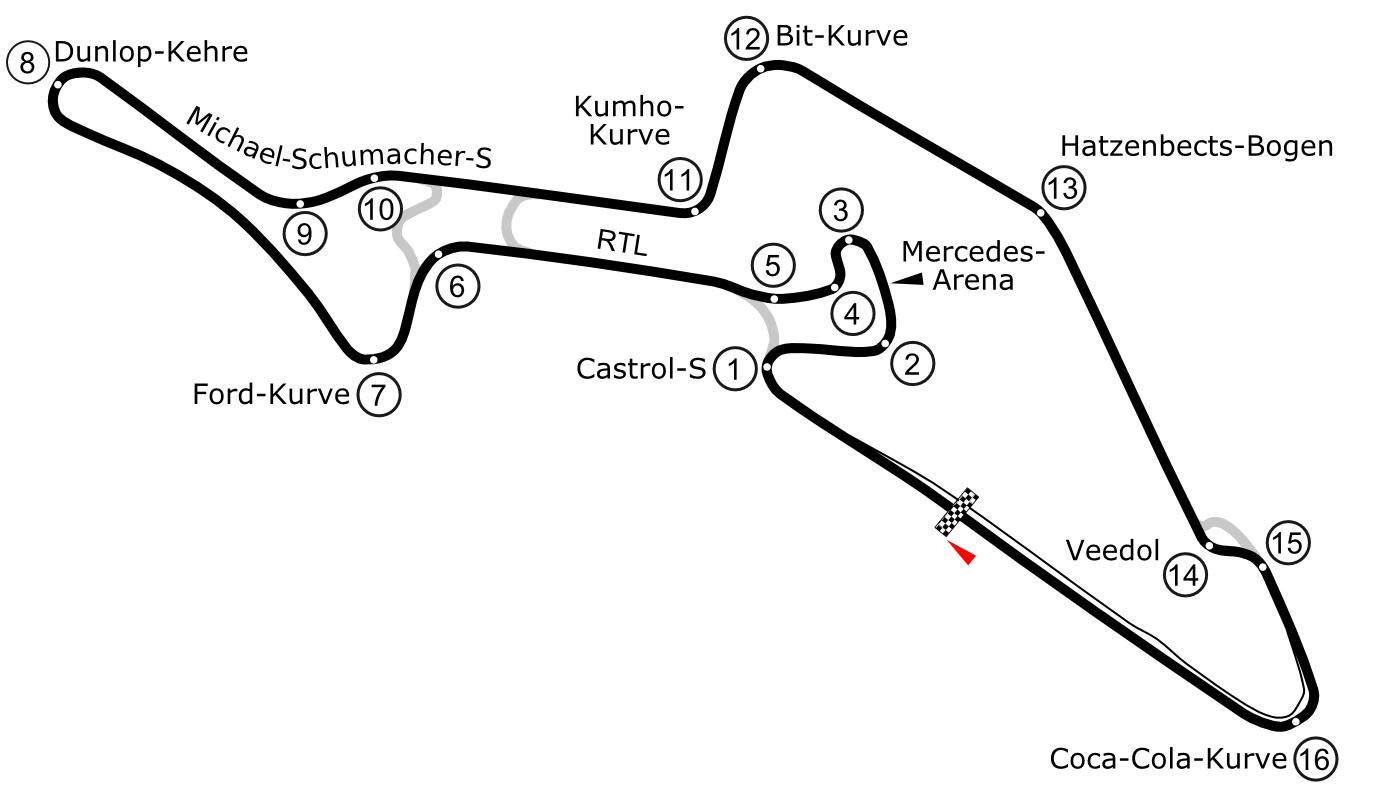
- Date: June 15, 2008
- Location: Nürburgring
- Course: Permanent racing facility 5.148 km (3.199 mi)

Superbike World Championship
Pole position
(Germany) Max Neukirchner
1:55.471
| Fastest lap race 1 | Fastest lap race 2 |
| (Australia) Troy Bayliss | (Japan) Noriyuki Haga |
| 1:57.276 | 1:56.892 |

Supersport World Championship
Pole position
(Australia) Broc Parkes
1:57.276
Fastest lap
(Australia) Broc Parkes
2:00.452

The 2008 Nürburgring Superbike World Championship round was the seventh round of the 2008 Superbike World Championship season. It took place on the weekend of June 13–15, 2008, at the Nürburgring.

== Superbike race 1 classification ==
| Pos | No | Rider | Bike | Laps | Time | Grid | Points |
|---|---|---|---|---|---|---|---|
| 1 | 41 | (Japan) Noriyuki Haga | Yamaha YZF-R1 | 20 | 39:19.427 | 4 | 25 |
| 2 | 21 | (Australia) Troy Bayliss | Ducati 1098 F08 | 20 | +2.025 | 2 | 20 |
| 3 | 76 | (Germany) Max Neukirchner | Suzuki GSX-R1000 | 20 | +2.792 | 1 | 16 |
| 4 | 11 | (Australia) Troy Corser | Yamaha YZF-R1 | 20 | +5.458 | 6 | 13 |
| 5 | 7 | (Spain) Carlos Checa | Honda CBR1000RR | 20 | +10.225 | 3 | 11 |
| 6 | 111 | (Spain) Ruben Xaus | Ducati 1098 RS 08 | 20 | +10.462 | 10 | 10 |
| 7 | 84 | (Italy) Michel Fabrizio | Ducati 1098 F08 | 20 | +17.018 | 5 | 9 |
| 8 | 10 | (Spain) Fonsi Nieto | Suzuki GSX-R1000 | 20 | +20.520 | 14 | 8 |
| 9 | 100 | (Japan) Makoto Tamada | Kawasaki ZX-10R | 20 | +21.162 | 21 | 7 |
| 10 | 31 | (Australia) Karl Muggeridge | Honda CBR1000RR | 20 | +22.650 | 9 | 6 |
| 11 | 96 | (Czech Republic) Jakub Smrz | Ducati 1098 RS 08 | 20 | +22.845 | 11 | 5 |
| 12 | 23 | (Japan) Ryuichi Kiyonari | Honda CBR1000RR | 20 | +25.555 | 12 | 4 |
| 13 | 3 | (Italy) Max Biaggi | Ducati 1098 RS 08 | 20 | +25.879 | 8 | 3 |
| 14 | 55 | (France) Régis Laconi | Kawasaki ZX-10R | 20 | +26.288 | 13 | 2 |
| 15 | 194 | (France) Sébastien Gimbert | Yamaha YZF-R1 | 20 | +32.824 | 15 | 1 |
| 16 | 44 | (Italy) Roberto Rolfo | Honda CBR1000RR | 20 | +42.157 | 25 | |
| 17 | 86 | (Italy) Ayrton Badovini | Kawasaki ZX-10R | 20 | +42.486 | 22 | |
| 18 | 38 | (Japan) Shinichi Nakatomi | Yamaha YZF-R1 | 20 | +52.232 | 19 | |
| 19 | 83 | (Australia) Russell Holland | Honda CBR1000RR | 20 | +52.387 | 23 | |
| 20 | 13 | (Italy) Vittorio Iannuzzo | Kawasaki ZX-10R | 20 | +1:00.099 | 26 | |
| Ret | 77 | (France) Loic Napoleone | Yamaha YZF-R1 | 16 | Retirement | 28 | |
| Ret | 57 | (Italy) Lorenzo Lanzi | Ducati 1098 RS 08 | 16 | Retirement | 7 | |
| Ret | 43 | (United States) Jason Pridmore | Honda CBR1000RR | 12 | Accident | 27 | |
| Ret | 54 | (Turkey) Kenan Sofuoğlu | Honda CBR1000RR | 6 | Retirement | 20 | |
| Ret | 94 | (Spain) David Checa | Yamaha YZF-R1 | 5 | Retirement | 17 | |
| Ret | 88 | (Japan) Shuhei Aoyama | Honda CBR1000RR | 3 | Retirement | 24 | |
| Ret | 36 | (Spain) Gregorio Lavilla | Honda CBR1000RR | 0 | Accident | 18 | |

== Superbike race 2 classification ==
| Pos | No | Rider | Bike | Laps | Time | Grid | Points |
|---|---|---|---|---|---|---|---|
| 1 | 41 | (Japan) Noriyuki Haga | Yamaha YZF-R1 | 14 | 27:26.594 | 4 | 25 |
| 2 | 11 | (Australia) Troy Corser | Yamaha YZF-R1 | 14 | +0.150 | 6 | 20 |
| 3 | 76 | (Germany) Max Neukirchner | Suzuki GSX-R1000 | 14 | +5.316 | 1 | 16 |
| 4 | 21 | (Australia) Troy Bayliss | Ducati 1098 F08 | 14 | +7.651 | 2 | 13 |
| 5 | 7 | (Spain) Carlos Checa | Honda CBR1000RR | 14 | +7.951 | 3 | 11 |
| 6 | 84 | (Italy) Michel Fabrizio | Ducati 1098 F08 | 14 | +9.027 | 5 | 10 |
| 7 | 3 | (Italy) Max Biaggi | Ducati 1098 RS 08 | 14 | +9.420 | 8 | 9 |
| 8 | 111 | (Spain) Ruben Xaus | Ducati 1098 RS 08 | 14 | +9.916 | 10 | 8 |
| 9 | 10 | (Spain) Fonsi Nieto | Suzuki GSX-R1000 | 14 | +12.862 | 14 | 7 |
| 10 | 55 | (France) Régis Laconi | Kawasaki ZX-10R | 14 | +13.559 | 13 | 6 |
| 11 | 23 | (Japan) Ryuichi Kiyonari | Honda CBR1000RR | 14 | +13.960 | 12 | 5 |
| 12 | 31 | (Australia) Karl Muggeridge | Honda CBR1000RR | 14 | +16.172 | 9 | 4 |
| 13 | 100 | (Japan) Makoto Tamada | Kawasaki ZX-10R | 14 | +17.946 | 21 | 3 |
| 14 | 36 | (Spain) Gregorio Lavilla | Honda CBR1000RR | 14 | +22.815 | 18 | 2 |
| 15 | 94 | (Spain) David Checa | Yamaha YZF-R1 | 14 | +23.758 | 17 | 1 |
| 16 | 194 | (France) Sébastien Gimbert | Yamaha YZF-R1 | 14 | +24.127 | 15 | |
| 17 | 44 | (Italy) Roberto Rolfo | Honda CBR1000RR | 14 | +24.421 | 25 | |
| 18 | 38 | (Japan) Shinichi Nakatomi | Yamaha YZF-R1 | 14 | +25.356 | 19 | |
| 19 | 83 | (Australia) Russell Holland | Honda CBR1000RR | 14 | +25.729 | 23 | |
| 20 | 57 | (Italy) Lorenzo Lanzi | Ducati 1098 F08 | 14 | +28.846 | 7 | |
| 21 | 54 | (Turkey) Kenan Sofuoğlu | Honda CBR1000RR | 14 | +33.107 | 20 | |
| 22 | 77 | (France) Loic Napoleone | Yamaha YZF-R1 | 14 | +54.255 | 28 | |
| 23 | 43 | (United States) Jason Pridmore | Honda CBR1000RR | 14 | +1'04.877 | 27 | |
| 24 | 88 | (Japan) Shuhei Aoyama | Honda CBR1000RR | 13 | +1 Lap | 24 | |
| Ret | 96 | (Czech Republic) Jakub Smrz | Ducati 1098 F08 | 8 | Accident | 11 | |
| Ret | 86 | (Italy) Ayrton Badovini | Kawasaki ZX-10R | 5 | Accident | 22 | |
| Ret | 13 | (Italy) Vittorio Iannuzzo | Kawasaki ZX-10R | 5 | Accident | 26 | |

== Supersport race classification ==
| Pos | No | Rider | Bike | Laps | Time | Grid | Points |
|---|---|---|---|---|---|---|---|
| 1 | 88 | (Australia) Andrew Pitt | Honda CBR600RR | 19 | 38:26.584 | 4 | 25 |
| 2 | 25 | (Australia) Josh Brookes | Honda CBR600RR | 19 | +0.387 | 3 | 20 |
| 3 | 23 | (Australia) Broc Parkes | Yamaha YZF-R6 | 19 | +1.379 | 1 | 16 |
| 4 | 99 | (France) Fabien Foret | Yamaha YZF-R6 | 19 | +10.279 | 10 | 13 |
| 5 | 18 | (United Kingdom) Craig Jones | Honda CBR600RR | 19 | +11.624 | 2 | 11 |
| 6 | 65 | (United Kingdom) Jonathan Rea | Honda CBR600RR | 19 | +19.211 | 13 | 10 |
| 7 | 83 | (Belgium) Didier van Keymeulen | Suzuki GSX-R600 | 19 | +28.775 | 15 | 9 |
| 8 | 111 | (Germany) Arne Tode | Triumph 675 | 19 | +28.890 | 7 | 8 |
| 9 | 9 | (United Kingdom) Chris Walker | Kawasaki ZX-6R | 19 | +28.990 | 20 | 7 |
| 10 | 31 | (Finland) Vesa Kallio | Honda CBR600RR | 19 | +37.853 | 24 | 6 |
| 11 | 21 | (Japan) Katsuaki Fujiwara | Kawasaki ZX-6R | 19 | +43.101 | 23 | 5 |
| 12 | 26 | (Spain) Joan Lascorz | Honda CBR600RR | 19 | +51.843 | 11 | 4 |
| 13 | 17 | (Portugal) Miguel Praia | Honda CBR600RR | 19 | +54.459 | 25 | 3 |
| 14 | 105 | (Italy) Gianluca Vizziello | Honda CBR600RR | 19 | +54.653 | 18 | 2 |
| 15 | 124 | (Australia) Jeremy Crowe | Yamaha YZF-R6 | 19 | +54.705 | 19 | 1 |
| 16 | 34 | (Hungary) Balázs Németh | Honda CBR600RR | 19 | +54.818 | 28 | |
| 17 | 38 | (France) Gregory Leblanc | Honda CBR600RR | 19 | +58.623 | 22 | |
| 18 | 37 | (San Marino) William de Angelis | Honda CBR600RR | 19 | +1:03.132 | 27 | |
| 19 | 81 | (United Kingdom) Graeme Gowland | Honda CBR600RR | 19 | +1:08.323 | 29 | |
| 20 | 199 | (Italy) Danilo dell'Omo | Honda CBR600RR | 19 | +1:08.443 | 26 | |
| 21 | 72 | (Hungary) Attila Magda | Honda CBR600RR | 19 | +1:25.250 | 31 | |
| Ret | 8 | (Australia) Mark Aitchison | Triumph 675 | 16 | Retirement | 5 | |
| Ret | 55 | (Italy) Massimo Roccoli | Yamaha YZF-R6 | 15 | Accident | 21 | |
| Ret | 51 | (Spain) Santiago Barragan | Honda CBR600RR | 14 | Accident | 30 | |
| Ret | 47 | (Italy) Ivan Clementi | Triumph 675 | 10 | Retirement | 17 | |
| Ret | 14 | (France) Matthieu Lagrive | Honda CBR600RR | 7 | Accident | 6 | |
| Ret | 127 | (Denmark) Robbin Harms | Honda CBR600RR | 7 | Accident | 12 | |
| Ret | 69 | (Italy) Gianluca Nannelli | Honda CBR600RR | 6 | Retirement | 16 | |
| Ret | 4 | (Italy) Lorenzo Alfonsi | Honda CBR600RR | 2 | Retirement | 32 | |
| DNS | 77 | (Netherlands) Barry Veneman | Suzuki GSX-R600 | | Accident | 9 | |
| DNS | 52 | (Spain) José David de Gea | Yamaha YZF-R6 | | Accident | 14 | |
| DNS | 6 | (United Kingdom) Tommy Hill | Honda CBR600RR | | Accident | 8 | |

== Superstock 1000 race classification ==
| Pos. | No. | Rider | Bike | Laps | Time/Retired | Grid | Points |
|---|---|---|---|---|---|---|---|
| 1 | 155 | (Australia) Brendan Roberts | Ducati 1098R | 11 | 22:17.805 | 1 | 25 |
| 2 | 34 | (Italy) Davide Giugliano | Suzuki GSX-R1000 K8 | 11 | +0.307 | 3 | 20 |
| 3 | 19 | (Belgium) Xavier Simeon | Suzuki GSX-R1000 K8 | 11 | +0.444 | 5 | 16 |
| 4 | 51 | (Italy) Michele Pirro | Yamaha YZF-R1 | 11 | +8.763 | 6 | 13 |
| 5 | 96 | (Czech Republic) Matěj Smrž | Honda CBR1000RR | 11 | +9.786 | 7 | 11 |
| 6 | 71 | (Italy) Claudio Corti | Yamaha YZF-R1 | 11 | +10.713 | 9 | 10 |
| 7 | 21 | (France) Maxime Berger | Honda CBR1000RR | 11 | +13.766 | 2 | 9 |
| 8 | 78 | (France) Freddy Foray | Suzuki GSX-R1000 K8 | 11 | +18.348 | 12 | 8 |
| 9 | 119 | (Italy) Michele Magnoni | Yamaha YZF-R1 | 11 | +19.419 | 14 | 7 |
| 10 | 132 | (France) Yoann Tiberio | Kawasaki ZX-10R | 11 | +22.772 | 20 | 6 |
| 11 | 23 | (Australia) Chris Seaton | Suzuki GSX-R1000 K8 | 11 | +23.827 | 22 | 5 |
| 12 | 77 | (United Kingdom) Barry Burrell | Honda CBR1000RR | 11 | +23.962 | 17 | 4 |
| 13 | 8 | (Italy) Andrea Antonelli | Honda CBR1000RR | 11 | +25.179 | 10 | 3 |
| 14 | 87 | (Australia) Gareth Jones | Suzuki GSX-R1000 K8 | 11 | +25.778 | 21 | 2 |
| 15 | 30 | (Switzerland) Michaël Savary | Suzuki GSX-R1000 K8 | 11 | +25.924 | 18 | 1 |
| 16 | 53 | (Italy) Alessandro Polita | Ducati 1098R | 11 | +27.910 | 35 | |
| 17 | 88 | (France) Kenny Foray | Yamaha YZF-R1 | 11 | +29.311 | 16 | |
| 18 | 15 | (Italy) Matteo Baiocco | Kawasaki ZX-10R | 11 | +31.642 | 11 | |
| 19 | 14 | (Sweden) Filip Backlund | Suzuki GSX-R1000 K8 | 11 | +33.424 | 23 | |
| 20 | 12 | (Italy) Alessio Aldrovandi | Kawasaki ZX-10R | 11 | +34.341 | 24 | |
| 21 | 41 | (Switzerland) Gregory Junod | Yamaha YZF-R1 | 11 | +42.169 | 26 | |
| 22 | 98 | (Germany) Oliver Skach | Suzuki GSX-R1000 K8 | 11 | +44.654 | 29 | |
| 23 | 18 | (United Kingdom) Matt Bond | Suzuki GSX-R1000 K8 | 11 | +44.894 | 27 | |
| 24 | 117 | (Italy) Denis Sacchetti | Ducati 1098R | 11 | +45.219 | 31 | |
| 25 | 89 | (Italy) Domenico Colucci | Ducati 1098R | 11 | +45.379 | 25 | |
| 26 | 24 | (Slovenia) Marko Jerman | Honda CBR1000RR | 11 | +47.406 | 38 | |
| 27 | 90 | (Czech Republic) Michal Drobný | Honda CBR1000RR | 11 | +47.537 | 32 | |
| 28 | 99 | (Netherlands) Roy Ten Napel | Suzuki GSX-R1000 K8 | 11 | +48.312 | 33 | |
| 29 | 154 | (Italy) Tommaso Lorenzetti | Suzuki GSX-R1000 K8 | 11 | +50.950 | 34 | |
| 30 | 5 | (Netherlands) Danny De Boer | Suzuki GSX-R1000 K8 | 11 | +51.219 | 28 | |
| 31 | 57 | (Australia) Cameron Stronach | Kawasaki ZX-10R | 11 | +52.173 | 36 | |
| 32 | 66 | (Netherlands) Branko Srdanov | Yamaha YZF-R1 | 11 | +57.482 | 39 | |
| 33 | 7 | (Austria) René Mähr | KTM 1190 RC8 | 11 | +1:16.859 | 30 | |
| 34 | 92 | (Slovenia) Jure Stibilj | Honda CBR1000RR | 11 | +1:33.598 | 40 | |
| Ret | 33 | (Estonia) Marko Rohtlaan | Honda CBR1000RR | 4 | Accident | 19 | |
| Ret | 996 | (Italy) Jonathan Gallina | Kawasaki ZX-10R | 2 | Retirement | 37 | |
| Ret | 35 | (Germany) Dominic Lammert | Suzuki GSX-R1000 K8 | 1 | Accident | 4 | |
| Ret | 20 | (France) Sylvain Barrier | Yamaha YZF-R1 | 0 | Accident | 15 | |
| Ret | 16 | (Netherlands) Raymond Schouten | Yamaha YZF-R1 | 0 | Accident | 13 | |
| Ret | 111 | (Italy) Fabrizio Perotti | Suzuki GSX-R1000 K8 | 0 | Accident | 8 | |
| DNQ | 58 | (Italy) Robert Gianfardoni | Ducati 1098R | | Did Not Qualify | | |

== Superstock 600 race classification ==
| Pos. | No. | Rider | Bike | Laps | Time/Retired | Grid | Points |
|---|---|---|---|---|---|---|---|
| 1 | 77 | (Czech Republic) Patrik Vostárek | Honda CBR600RR | 9 | 18:54.960 | 1 | 25 |
| 2 | 65 | (France) Loris Baz | Yamaha YZF-R6 | 9 | +0.083 | 2 | 20 |
| 3 | 44 | (United Kingdom) Gino Rea | Yamaha YZF-R6 | 9 | +1.445 | 4 | 16 |
| 4 | 3 | (Italy) Giuliano Gregorini | Honda CBR600RR | 9 | +1.776 | 5 | 13 |
| 5 | 5 | (Italy) Marco Bussolotti | Yamaha YZF-R6 | 9 | +2.038 | 7 | 11 |
| 6 | 45 | (United Kingdom) Dan Linfoot | Yamaha YZF-R6 | 9 | +2.067 | 6 | 10 |
| 7 | 99 | (United Kingdom) Gregg Black | Yamaha YZF-R6 | 9 | +10.034 | 15 | 9 |
| 8 | 119 | (Italy) Danilo Petrucci | Yamaha YZF-R6 | 9 | +10.740 | 13 | 8 |
| 9 | 93 | (France) Mathieu Lussiana | Yamaha YZF-R6 | 9 | +11.068 | 14 | 7 |
| 10 | 7 | (Italy) Renato Costantini | Yamaha YZF-R6 | 9 | +13.100 | 21 | 6 |
| 11 | 57 | (Denmark) Kenny Tirsgaard | Suzuki GSX-R600 | 9 | +13.778 | 8 | 5 |
| 12 | 69 | (Czech Republic) Ondřej Ježek | Kawasaki ZX-6R | 9 | +15.431 | 22 | 4 |
| 13 | 55 | (Belgium) Vincent Lonbois | Suzuki GSX-R600 | 9 | +15.644 | 11 | 3 |
| 14 | 111 | (Czech Republic) Michal Šembera | Honda CBR600RR | 9 | +16.855 | 20 | 2 |
| 15 | 11 | (France) Jérémy Guarnoni | Yamaha YZF-R6 | 9 | +17.421 | 18 | 1 |
| 16 | 56 | (United Kingdom) David Paton | Honda CBR600RR | 9 | +19.197 | 12 | |
| 17 | 91 | (Sweden) Hampus Johansson | Yamaha YZF-R6 | 9 | +22.218 | 19 | |
| 18 | 72 | (Norway) Fredrik Karlsen | Yamaha YZF-R6 | 9 | +22.844 | 26 | |
| 19 | 96 | (United Kingdom) Daniel Brill | Honda CBR600RR | 9 | +23.485 | 24 | |
| 20 | 23 | (Switzerland) Christian Von Gunten | Suzuki GSX-R600 | 9 | +26.953 | 16 | |
| 21 | 42 | (Italy) Leonardo Biliotti | Honda CBR600RR | 9 | +35.588 | 10 | |
| 22 | 6 | (Italy) Andrea Boscoscuro | Kawasaki ZX-6R | 9 | +36.183 | 25 | |
| 23 | 24 | (Italy) Daniele Beretta | Suzuki GSX-R600 | 9 | +40.587 | 3 | |
| 24 | 88 | (Spain) Yannick Guerra | Yamaha YZF-R6 | 9 | +40.871 | 27 | |
| 25 | 47 | (Italy) Eddi La Marra | Suzuki GSX-R600 | 9 | +46.178 | 9 | |
| 26 | 12 | (United Kingdom) Sam Lowes | Honda CBR600RR | 9 | +50.109 | 28 | |
| 27 | 21 | (United Kingdom) Alex Lowes | Kawasaki ZX-6R | 9 | +50.864 | 17 | |
| 28 | 14 | (Belgium) Nicolas Pirot | Yamaha YZF-R6 | 9 | +1:01.972 | 30 | |
| Ret | 35 | (Italy) Simone Grotzkyj | Honda CBR600RR | 7 | Retirement | 23 | |
| Ret | 10 | (Spain) Nacho Calero | Yamaha YZF-R6 | 3 | Retirement | 29 | |
| DNS | 18 | (France) Nicolas Pouhair | Yamaha YZF-R6 | | Did not start | | |

== Notes ==
- The Superbike Race 2 was stopped after 14 laps for rain. However, full points were given.
- The Supersport race was stopped after one lap for a crash at the first corner. The race was restarted for its full length but three riders (Hill, de Gea and Veneman) were injured and did not take part.
