= 2008 Supersport World Championship =

2008 Supersport World Championship
Previous:	2007	Next:	2009
Support series: Superbike World Championship; FIM Superstock 1000 Cup; European Superstock 600 Championship

The 2008 Supersport World Championship was the tenth FIM Supersport World Championship season—the twelfth taking into account the two held under the name of Supersport World Series. The season started on 23 February at Losail and finished on 2 November at Portimão after 13 rounds. The championship supported the Superbike World Championship at every round with the exception of Salt Lake City.

The season was marred by the death of Craig Jones as a result of injuries sustained in an accident at the Brands Hatch round.

== Race calendar and results ==
Round	Date	Round	Circuit	Pole position	Fastest lap	Race winner	Report
1	23 February	Qatar	Losail	(France) Fabien Foret	(France) Fabien Foret	(Australia) Broc Parkes	Report
2	2 March	Australia	Phillip Island	(Australia) Andrew Pitt	(Denmark) Robbin Harms	(Australia) Andrew Pitt	Report
3	6 April	Spain	Valencia	(Australia) Andrew Pitt	(Australia) Broc Parkes	(Spain) Joan Lascorz	Report
4	27 April	Netherlands	Assen	(Australia) Broc Parkes	(Italy) Gianluca Vizziello	(Australia) Andrew Pitt	Report
5	11 May	Italy	Monza	(Australia) Broc Parkes	(France) Fabien Foret	(France) Fabien Foret	Report
6	15 June	Germany	Nürburgring	(Australia) Broc Parkes	(Australia) Broc Parkes	(Australia) Andrew Pitt	Report
7	29 June	San Marino	Misano	(Australia) Broc Parkes	(Australia) Broc Parkes	(Australia) Andrew Pitt	Report
8	20 July	Czech Republic	Brno	(Australia) Broc Parkes	(Australia) Andrew Pitt	(United Kingdom) Jonathan Rea	Report
9	3 August	Great Britain	Brands Hatch	(France) Matthieu Lagrive	(Australia) Andrew Pitt	(United Kingdom) Jonathan Rea	Report
10	7 September	(European Union) Europe	Donington Park	(France) Matthieu Lagrive	(Australia) Josh Brookes	(Australia) Josh Brookes	Report
11	21 September	Italy	Vallelunga	(Australia) Broc Parkes	(Australia) Broc Parkes	(United Kingdom) Jonathan Rea	Report
12	5 October	France	Magny-Cours	(Australia) Broc Parkes	(Australia) Broc Parkes	(Australia) Andrew Pitt	Report
13	2 November	Portugal	Portimao	(Turkey) Kenan Sofuoğlu	(Turkey) Kenan Sofuoğlu	(Turkey) Kenan Sofuoğlu	Report

== Championship standings ==
=== Riders' standings ===
Pos.	Rider	Bike	QAT (Qatar)	AUS (Australia)	ESP (Spain)	NED (Netherlands)	ITA (Italy)	GER (Germany)	SMR (San Marino)	CZE (Czech Republic)	GBR (United Kingdom)	EUR (European Union)	ITA (Italy)	FRA (France)	POR (Portugal)	Pts
1	(Australia) Andrew Pitt	Honda	Ret	**1**	**19**	1	4	1	1	2	3	2	Ret	1	2	214
2	(United Kingdom) Jonathan Rea	Honda	Ret	5	6	2	Ret	6	3	1	1	3	1	10		164
3	(Australia) Josh Brookes	Honda	4	2	Ret	6	2	2	14	3	5	1	12	3	11	162
4	(Australia) Broc Parkes	Yamaha	1	Ret	4	**5**	**3**	**3**	**10**	**4**	4	10	**2**	**Ret**	5	150
5	(Spain) Joan Lascorz	Honda	2	7	1	3	9	12	Ret	18	14	7	4	Ret	3	121
6	(France) Fabien Foret	Yamaha	**Ret**	4	2	4	1	4	4	DNS				8	10	111
7	(United Kingdom) Craig Jones	Honda	3	16	3	9	6	5	2	Ret	2					100
8	(Netherlands) Barry Veneman	Suzuki	6	20	Ret	7	Ret	DNS	8	5	6	4	5	2	Ret	92
9	(Denmark) Robbin Harms	Honda	7	3	Ret	13	5	Ret	5	Ret	Ret	6	6	15	Ret	71
10	(Italy) Gianluca Nannelli	Honda	Ret	10	5	Ret	13	Ret	13	6	7	16	7	7	6	70
11	(Italy) Gianluca Vizziello	Honda	10	8	12	8	Ret	14	11	12	12	11	15	11	8	60
12	(Italy) Massimo Roccoli	Yamaha	Ret	9	7	Ret	7	Ret	7	10	8	17	17	6	Ret	58
13	(France) Matthieu Lagrive	Honda	5	17	13	10	8	Ret	Ret	8	**19**	**9**	Ret	4	Ret	56
14	(Australia) Mark Aitchison	Triumph	Ret	12	10	11	11	Ret	6	22	Ret	13	9	DNS	9	47
15	(Belgium) Didier van Keymeulen	Suzuki	16	DNS	20	Ret	17	7	18	14	Ret	8	8	5	15	39
16	(United Kingdom) Chris Walker	Kawasaki	9	14	9	12	Ret	9	12	11						36
17	(Italy) Ivan Clementi	Triumph	12	11	Ret	14	21	Ret	9	13	DNS	18	11	14	21	28
18	(United States) Josh Hayes	Honda											10	9	4	26
19	(Turkey) Kenan Sofuoğlu	Honda													**1**	25
20	(Finland) Vesa Kallio	Honda	14	15	14	18	14	10	Ret	9	13	Ret				23
21	(Republic of Ireland) Eugene Laverty	Yamaha										12	3			20
22	(Japan) Katsuaki Fujiwara	Kawasaki	15	Ret	11	Ret	15	11	Ret	16	Ret	14	18	12	22	18
23	(South Africa) Hudson Kennaugh	Yamaha									10	5				17
24	(Spain) Ángel Rodríguez	Yamaha			8	Ret	10									14
25	(Portugal) Miguel Praia	Honda	13	21	15	17	Ret	13	Ret	Ret	Ret	Ret	13	Ret	12	14
26	(Australia) Garry McCoy	Triumph	Ret	6	Ret	Ret	Ret		Ret	DNS					13	13
27	(Australia) Russell Holland	Honda							Ret	7	Ret	Ret	16	16	14	11
28	(Italy) Simone Sanna	Honda					Ret								7	9
29	(Spain) David Salom	Yamaha	8	18	16	16	16		Ret	15	21	Ret	19	17	16	9
30	(Germany) Arne Tode	Triumph						8								8
30	(Germany) Arne Tode	Honda							Ret							8
31	(United Kingdom) Rob Frost	Triumph									9	Ret				7
32	(United Kingdom) Steve Plater	Triumph									11					5
33	(France) Grégory Leblanc	Honda	11	25	Ret	Ret	23	17	22	Ret						5
34	(Italy) Cristiano Migliorati	Kawasaki					12									4
35	(United Kingdom) Graeme Gowland	Honda	Ret	13	Ret	19	Ret	19	24	Ret	15	20	21	DNS		4
36	(Czech Republic) Patrik Vostárek	Honda											22	13	20	3
37	(Italy) Terence Toti	Suzuki											14			2
38	(United Kingdom) Chris Martin	Kawasaki									Ret	15	20	16	24	1
39	(Italy) Danilo Marrancone	Yamaha							15							1
40	(Australia) Jeremy Crowe	Yamaha						15				DNQ	24			1
41	(Italy) Ilario Dionisi	Triumph	21	Ret	Ret	15										1
	(Hungary) Balázs Németh	Honda						16	26	19	23	21	25	19	19	0
	(Italy) Roberto Lunadei	Honda							16							0
	(Italy) Danilo Dell'Omo	Honda	23	23	Ret	22	19	20	20	17	16	19	Ret			0
	(San Marino) William De Angelis	Honda	17	Ret	17	27	24	18	17	Ret	25					0
	(New Zealand) Midge Smart	Honda								17	23					0
	(France) Arnaud Vincent	Kawasaki	Ret	22	18	Ret										0
	(Germany) Jesco Günther	Triumph						DNS								0
	(Germany) Jesco Günther	Honda							19	Ret	20	Ret	Ret	18	17	0
	(Italy) Mirko Giansanti	Honda	19	28	Ret	20	18									0
	(Italy) Lorenzo Alfonsi	Kawasaki	18	19												0
	(Italy) Lorenzo Alfonsi	Honda			Ret	23	25	Ret	21	23	27	Ret	Ret	Ret		0
	(Poland) Paweł Szkopek	Triumph									18	Ret				0
	(Spain) Iván Silva	Yamaha													18	0
	(Spain) Santiago Barragán	Honda	20	30	Ret	25	22	Ret	27	Ret	28	24		22	23	0
	(United Kingdom) Kev Coghlan	Honda				21	20									0
	(Italy) Denis Sacchetti	Honda								20	22	Ret	26	Ret	Ret	0
	(France) David Perret	Honda											23	20		0
	(Hungary) Gergő Talmácsi	Honda	Ret	24	21		27									0
	(Hungary) Attila Magda	Honda	22	27	23		Ret	21	28							0
	(Spain) Javier Hidalgo	Yamaha							25	21	24					0
	(Slovenia) Luka Nedog	Honda	Ret	26	22	Ret	26									0
	(Australia) Bryan Staring	Honda										22				0
	(Italy) Alessandro Brannetti	Yamaha							23							0
	(Spain) Josep Pedro Subirats	Yamaha	24	29												0
	(Netherlands) Ron van Steenbergen	Honda				24										0
	(Italy) Ruggero Scambia	Triumph					Ret		Ret	24	26	DNQ				0
	(Portugal) Tiago Dias	Yamaha													25	0
	(Netherlands) Jurjen Uitterdijk	Yamaha				26										0
	(Portugal) Hélder Silva	Honda													26	0
	(Australia) Alex Cudlin	Triumph											27			0
	(Italy) Andrea Antonelli	Honda	Ret	Ret												
	(Spain) Adrián Bonastre	Honda			Ret											
	(United Kingdom) Karl Harris	Yamaha									Ret					
	(Australia) Billy McConnell	Kawasaki									Ret					
	(Italy) Giuseppe Barone	Honda											Ret			
	(Italy) Andrea Zappa	Triumph											Ret			
	(France) Julien Enjolras	Yamaha												Ret		
	(France) Thierry Mulot	Kawasaki												Ret		
	(Spain) Arturo Tizón	Suzuki													Ret	
	(Spain) José David de Gea	Yamaha			WD			DNS								
	(United Kingdom) Tommy Hill	Honda						DNS								
Pos.	Rider	Bike	QAT (Qatar)	AUS (Australia)	ESP (Spain)	NED (Netherlands)	ITA (Italy)	GER (Germany)	SMR (San Marino)	CZE (Czech Republic)	GBR (United Kingdom)	EUR (European Union)	ITA (Italy)	FRA (France)	POR (Portugal)	Pts

Colour	Result
Gold	Winner
Silver	Second place
Bronze	Third place
Green	Points classification
Blue	Non-points classification
Blue	Non-classified finish (NC)
Purple	Retired, not classified (Ret)
Red	Did not qualify (DNQ)
Red	Did not pre-qualify (DNPQ)
Black	Disqualified (DSQ)
White	Did not start (DNS)
White	Withdrew (WD)
White	Race cancelled (C)
Blank	Did not practice (DNP)
Blank	Did not arrive (DNA)
Blank	Excluded (EX)

**Bold** – Pole position
Italics – Fastest lap

=== Manufacturers' standings ===
Pos.	Manufacturer	QAT (Qatar)	AUS (Australia)	ESP (Spain)	NED (Netherlands)	ITA (Italy)	GER (Germany)	SMR (San Marino)	CZE (Czech Republic)	GBR (United Kingdom)	EUR (European Union)	ITA (Italy)	FRA (France)	POR (Portugal)	Pts
1	(Japan) Honda	2	1	1	1	2	1	1	1	1	1	1	1	1	315
2	(Japan) Yamaha	1	4	2	4	1	3	4	4	4	5	2	6	5	203
3	(Japan) Suzuki	6	20	20	7	17	7	8	5	6	4	5	2	15	102
4	(United Kingdom) Triumph	12	6	10	11	11	8	6	13	9	13	9	14	9	77
5	(Japan) Kawasaki	9	14	9	12	12	9	12	11	Ret	14	18	12	22	46
Pos.	Manufacturer	QAT (Qatar)	AUS (Australia)	ESP (Spain)	NED (Netherlands)	ITA (Italy)	GER (Germany)	SMR (San Marino)	CZE (Czech Republic)	GBR (United Kingdom)	EUR (European Union)	ITA (Italy)	FRA (France)	POR (Portugal)	Pts

== Entry list ==
2008 entry list
Team	Constructor	Motorcycle	No.	Rider	Rounds
Kawasaki Gil Motor Sport	Kawasaki	Kawasaki ZX-6R	3	(Australia) Billy McConnell	9
Kawasaki Gil Motor Sport	Kawasaki	Kawasaki ZX-6R	9	(United Kingdom) Chris Walker	1–8
Kawasaki Gil Motor Sport	Kawasaki	Kawasaki ZX-6R	21	(Japan) Katsuaki Fujiwara	All
Kawasaki Gil Motor Sport	Kawasaki	Kawasaki ZX-6R	126	(United Kingdom) Chris Martin	10–13
PMS	Kawasaki	Kawasaki ZX-6R	4	(Italy) Lorenzo Alfonsi	1–2
PMS	Honda	Honda CBR600RR	4	(Italy) Lorenzo Alfonsi	3–6
PMS	Honda	Honda CBR600RR	111	(Germany) Arne Tode	7
CRS Grand Prix	Honda	Honda CBR600RR	4	(Italy) Lorenzo Alfonsi	7–12
CRS Grand Prix	Honda	Honda CBR600RR	35	(Italy) Giuseppe Barone	11
CRS Grand Prix	Honda	Honda CBR600RR	38	(France) Grégory Leblanc	1–8
CRS Grand Prix	Honda	Honda CBR600RR	53	(New Zealand) Midge Smart	9–10
CRS Grand Prix	Honda	Honda CBR600RR	75	(Slovenia) Luka Nedog	1–5
Yamaha World Supersport	Yamaha	Yamaha YZF-R6	5	(United Kingdom) Karl Harris	9
Yamaha World Supersport	Yamaha	Yamaha YZF-R6	23	(Australia) Broc Parkes	All
Yamaha World Supersport	Yamaha	Yamaha YZF-R6	50	(Republic of Ireland) Eugene Laverty	10–11
Yamaha World Supersport	Yamaha	Yamaha YZF-R6	99	(France) Fabien Foret	1–8, 12–13
Triumph Italia BE1 Racing	Triumph	Triumph 675	8	(Australia) Mark Aitchison	All
Triumph Italia BE1 Racing	Triumph	Triumph 675	22	(United Kingdom) Steve Plater	9
Triumph Italia BE1 Racing	Triumph	Triumph 675	24	(Australia) Garry McCoy	13
Triumph Italia BE1 Racing	Triumph	Triumph 675	47	(Italy) Ivan Clementi	1–8, 10–13
Hannspree Honda Althea	Honda	Honda CBR600RR	6	(United Kingdom) Tommy Hill	6
Hannspree Honda Althea	Honda	Honda CBR600RR	11	(Australia) Russell Holland	7–13
Hannspree Honda Althea	Honda	Honda CBR600RR	61	(Italy) Andrea Antonelli	1–2
Hannspree Honda Althea	Honda	Honda CBR600RR	69	(Italy) Gianluca Nannelli	All
Hannspree Honda Althea	Honda	Honda CBR600RR	101	(United Kingdom) Kev Coghlan	4–5
Intermoto Czech	Honda	Honda CBR600RR	7	(Czech Republic) Patrik Vostárek	11–13
Intermoto Czech	Honda	Honda CBR600RR	14	(France) Matthieu Lagrive	All
Intermoto Czech	Honda	Honda CBR600RR	37	(San Marino) William De Angelis	1–9
Intermoto Czech	Honda	Honda CBR600RR	67	(Australia) Bryan Staring	10
Berry Racing	Honda	Honda CBR600RR	10	(France) David Perret	11–12
Berry Racing	Honda	Honda CBR600RR	32	(Italy) Mirko Giansanti	1–5
Berry Racing	Honda	Honda CBR600RR	81	(United Kingdom) Graeme Gowland	6–12
Berry Racing	Honda	Honda CBR600RR	105	(Italy) Gianluca Vizziello	1–10
Yamaha Spain	Yamaha	Yamaha YZF-R6	12	(Spain) Javier Hidalgo	7–9
Yamaha Spain	Yamaha	Yamaha YZF-R6	44	(Spain) David Salom	1–5, 7–13
Yamaha Spain	Yamaha	Yamaha YZF-R6	52	(Spain) José David de Gea	3, 6
Yamaha Spain	Yamaha	Yamaha YZF-R6	122	(Spain) Iván Silva	13
Yamaha Spain	Yamaha	Yamaha YZF-R6	124	(Australia) Jeremy Crowe	6, 10–11
Yamaha Spain	Yamaha	Yamaha YZF-R6	147	(Spain) Ángel Rodríguez	4–5
Yamaha Spain	Yamaha	Yamaha YZF-R6	888	(Spain) Josep Pedro Subirats	1–2
Puccetti Racing Kawasaki	Kawasaki	Kawasaki ZX-6R	13	(Italy) Cristiano Migliorati	5
Factory Racing	Honda	Honda CBR600RR	15	(Hungary) Gergő Talmácsi	1–3, 5
Factory Racing	Honda	Honda CBR600RR	34	(Hungary) Balázs Németh	6–13
Factory Racing	Honda	Honda CBR600RR	72	(Hungary) Attila Magda	1–3, 5–7
Factory Racing	Honda	Honda CBR600RR	117	(Italy) Denis Sacchetti	8–13
Parkalgar Racing Team	Honda	Honda CBR600RR	17	(Portugal) Miguel Praia	All
Parkalgar Racing Team	Honda	Honda CBR600RR	18	(United Kingdom) Craig Jones	1–9
Parkalgar Racing Team	Honda	Honda CBR600RR	41	(United States) Josh Hayes	11–13
Parkalgar Racing Team	Honda	Honda CBR600RR	116	(Italy) Simone Sanna	5, 13
Triumph – SC	Triumph	Triumph 675	19	(Poland) Paweł Szkopek	9–10
Triumph – SC	Triumph	Triumph 675	24	(Australia) Garry McCoy	1–5, 7–8
Triumph – SC	Triumph	Triumph 675	28	(Italy) Ruggero Scambia	5, 7–10
Triumph – SC	Triumph	Triumph 675	42	(Australia) Alex Cudlin	11
Triumph – SC	Triumph	Triumph 675	45	(Italy) Andrea Zappa	11
Triumph – SC	Triumph	Triumph 675	57	(Italy) Ilario Dionisi	1–4
Helder Team	Honda	Honda CBR600RR	20	(Portugal) Hélder Silva	13
Hannspree Stiggy Motors Honda	Honda	Honda CBR600RR	25	(Australia) Josh Brookes	All
Hannspree Stiggy Motors Honda	Honda	Honda CBR600RR	127	(Denmark) Robbin Harms	All
Glaner Motocard.com	Honda	Honda CBR600RR	26	(Spain) Joan Lascorz	All
Glaner Motocard.com	Honda	Honda CBR600RR	51	(Spain) Santiago Barragán	1–10, 12–13
Team Buff	Triumph	Triumph 675	27	(United Kingdom) Robert Frost	9–10
Benjan Racing Team	Honda	Honda CBR600RR	30	(Germany) Jesco Günther	7–13
Benjan Racing Team	Honda	Honda CBR600RR	31	(Finland) Vesa Kallio	1–10
Benjan Racing Team	Honda	Honda CBR600RR	81	(United Kingdom) Graeme Gowland	1–5
Benjan Racing Team	Honda	Honda CBR600RR	105	(Italy) Gianluca Vizziello	11–13
Raceways Yamaha	Yamaha	Yamaha YZF-R6	33	(South Africa) Hudson Kennaugh	9–10
Hannspree Ten Kate Honda	Honda	Honda CBR600RR	54	(Turkey) Kenan Sofuoğlu	13
Hannspree Ten Kate Honda	Honda	Honda CBR600RR	65	(United Kingdom) Jonathan Rea	1–12
Hannspree Ten Kate Honda	Honda	Honda CBR600RR	88	(Australia) Andrew Pitt	All
Yamaha Lorenzini by Leoni	Yamaha	Yamaha YZF-R6	55	(Italy) Massimo Roccoli	All
Stichting Racen Tegen Kanker	Honda	Honda CBR600RR	63	(Netherlands) Ron van Steenbergen	4
Woudstra's Wegrace Promotie	Yamaha	Yamaha YZF-R6	71	(Netherlands) Jurjen Uitterdijk	4
Up Racing	Kawasaki	Kawasaki ZX-6R	74	(France) Thierry Mulot	12
RES Software Hoegee Suzuki	Suzuki	Suzuki GSX-R600	77	(Netherlands) Barry Veneman	All
RES Software Hoegee Suzuki	Suzuki	Suzuki GSX-R600	83	(Belgium) Didier Van Keymeulen	All
WCR Bike Service	Yamaha	Yamaha YZF-R6	80	(Italy) Alessandro Brannetti	7
WCR Bike Service	Yamaha	Yamaha YZF-R6	125	(Italy) Danilo Marrancone	7
Team Honda Merson	Honda	Honda CBR600RR	82	(Spain) Adrián Bonastre	3
Wilbers Racing	Triumph	Triumph 675	96	(Germany) Jesco Günther	6
G-LAB Racing Sport Evolution	Triumph	Triumph 675	111	(Germany) Arne Tode	6
44 Racing Team	Honda	Honda CBR600RR	113	(Italy) Roberto Lunadei	7
Gil Motor Sport – Solution F	Kawasaki	Kawasaki ZX-6R	121	(France) Arnaud Vincent	1–4
Celani Team Suzuki Italia	Suzuki	Suzuki GSX-R600	123	(Italy) Terence Toti	11
Gearlink Kawasaki	Kawasaki	Kawasaki ZX-6R	126	(United Kingdom) Chris Martin	9
L'Oreal Men Expert Laglisse	Yamaha	Yamaha YZF-R6	147	(Spain) Ángel Rodríguez	3
BPN	Yamaha	Yamaha YZF-R6	155	(Portugal) Tiago Dias	13
Tati Team	Yamaha	Yamaha YZF-R6	169	(France) Julien Enjolras	12
HP Racing Team	Honda	Honda CBR600RR	199	(Italy) Danilo Dell'Omo	1–11
Suzuki Motorrad	Suzuki	Suzuki GSX-R600	240	(Spain) Arturo Tizón	13

Key
Regular rider
Wildcard rider
Replacement rider

- All entries used Pirelli tyres.
