= 2008 Brno Superbike World Championship round =

(Czech Republic) 2008 Brno Superbike World Championship round
Round details
- Round 9 of 14 rounds in the 2008 Superbike World Championship. and Round 8 of 13 rounds in the 2008 Supersport World Championship.
- Date: July 20, 2008
- Location: Masaryk Circuit
- Course: Permanent racing facility 5.403 km (3.357 mi)

Superbike World Championship
Pole position
(Australia) Troy Bayliss
1:58.345
Fastest lap race 1	Fastest lap race 2
(Australia) Troy Bayliss	(Italy) Michel Fabrizio
2:00.298	1:59.979

Supersport World Championship
Pole position
(Australia) Broc Parkes
2:03.203
Fastest lap
(Australia) Andrew Pitt
2:04.062

The 2008 Brno Superbike World Championship round was the ninth round of the 2008 Superbike World Championship. It took place on the weekend of July 18–20, 2008, at the Masaryk Circuit located in Brno.

== Superbike race 1 classification ==
Pos	No	Rider	Bike	Laps	Time	Grid	Points
1	21	(Australia) Troy Bayliss	Ducati 1098 F08	20	40:22.724	1	25
2	11	(Australia) Troy Corser	Yamaha YZF-R1	20	+1.468	2	20
3	84	(Italy) Michel Fabrizio	Ducati 1098 F08	20	+3.272	3	16
4	3	(Italy) Max Biaggi	Ducati 1098 RS 08	20	+3.475	4	13
5	23	(Japan) Ryuichi Kiyonari	Honda CBR1000RR	20	+3.791	5	11
6	41	(Japan) Noriyuki Haga	Yamaha YZF-R1	20	+9.120	12	10
7	76	(Germany) Max Neukirchner	Suzuki GSX-R1000	20	+9.358	9	9
8	7	(Spain) Carlos Checa	Honda CBR1000RR	20	+11.787	13	8
9	34	(Japan) Yukio Kagayama	Suzuki GSX-R1000	20	+17.228	10	7
10	54	(Turkey) Kenan Sofuoğlu	Honda CBR1000RR	20	+17.705	26	6
11	31	(Australia) Karl Muggeridge	Honda CBR1000RR	20	+22.347	15	5
12	38	(Japan) Shinichi Nakatomi	Yamaha YZF-R1	20	+25.563	18	4
13	59	(Italy) Niccolò Canepa	Ducati 1098 F08	20	+25.699	6	3
14	10	(Spain) Fonsi Nieto	Suzuki GSX-R1000	20	+34.064	7	2
15	36	(Spain) Gregorio Lavilla	Honda CBR1000RR	20	+36.545	19	1
16	100	(Japan) Makoto Tamada	Kawasaki ZX-10R	20	+43.934	22	
17	86	(Italy) Ayrton Badovini	Kawasaki ZX-10R	20	+44.339	16	
18	88	(Japan) Shuhei Aoyama	Honda CBR1000RR	20	+50.092	23	
19	43	(United States) Jason Pridmore	Honda CBR1000RR	20	+58.827	29	
20	113	(Czech Republic) Jiri Drazdak	Honda CBR1000RR	20	+59.928	27	
21	73	(Austria) Christian Zaiser	Yamaha YZF-R1	20	+1:21.587	28	
Ret	194	(France) Sébastien Gimbert	Yamaha YZF-R1	18	Accident	24	
Ret	13	(Italy) Vittorio Iannuzzo	Kawasaki ZX-10R	9	Retirement	25	
Ret	44	(Italy) Roberto Rolfo	Honda CBR1000RR	8	Retirement	20	
Ret	111	(Spain) Ruben Xaus	Ducati 1098 RS 08	8	Retirement	11	
Ret	15	(Czech Republic) Milos Cihak	Suzuki GSX-R1000	5	Accident	30	
Ret	94	(Spain) David Checa	Yamaha YZF-R1	3	Accident	17	
Ret	57	(Italy) Lorenzo Lanzi	Ducati 1098 RS 08	3	Accident	14	
Ret	55	(France) Régis Laconi	Kawasaki ZX-10R	3	Accident	21	
Ret	96	(Czech Republic) Jakub Smrz	Ducati 1098 RS 08	3	Accident	8	

== Superbike race 2 classification ==
Pos	No	Rider	Bike	Laps	Time	Grid	Points
1	21	(Australia) Troy Bayliss	Ducati 1098 F08	20	40:16.436	1	25
2	84	(Italy) Michel Fabrizio	Ducati 1098 F08	20	+0.928	3	20
3	3	(Italy) Max Biaggi	Ducati 1098 RS 08	20	+1.259	4	16
4	11	(Australia) Troy Corser	Yamaha YZF-R1	20	+1.785	2	13
5	76	(Germany) Max Neukirchner	Suzuki GSX-R1000	20	+3.942	9	11
6	23	(Japan) Ryuichi Kiyonari	Honda CBR1000RR	20	+7.910	5	10
7	41	(Japan) Noriyuki Haga	Yamaha YZF-R1	20	+11.297	12	9
8	10	(Spain) Fonsi Nieto	Suzuki GSX-R1000	20	+11.375	7	8
9	34	(Japan) Yukio Kagayama	Suzuki GSX-R1000	20	+13.103	10	7
10	54	(Turkey) Kenan Sofuoğlu	Honda CBR1000RR	20	+18.978	26	6
11	96	(Czech Republic) Jakub Smrz	Ducati 1098 RS 08	20	+19.106	8	5
12	44	(Italy) Roberto Rolfo	Honda CBR1000RR	20	+20.556	20	4
13	57	(Italy) Lorenzo Lanzi	Ducati 1098 RS 08	20	+21.775	14	3
14	36	(Spain) Gregorio Lavilla	Honda CBR1000RR	20	+26.372	19	2
15	38	(Japan) Shinichi Nakatomi	Yamaha YZF-R1	20	+26.922	18	1
16	94	(Spain) David Checa	Yamaha YZF-R1	20	+27.109	17	
17	100	(Japan) Makoto Tamada	Kawasaki ZX-10R	20	+39.711	22	
18	88	(Japan) Shuhei Aoyama	Honda CBR1000RR	20	+39.953	23	
19	43	(United States) Jason Pridmore	Honda CBR1000RR	20	+56.812	29	
20	73	(Austria) Christian Zaiser	Yamaha YZF-R1	20	+1:44.073	28	
21	15	(Czech Republic) Milos Cihak	Suzuki GSX-R1000	20	+1:46.620	30	
Ret	31	(Australia) Karl Muggeridge	Honda CBR1000RR	15	Retirement	15	
Ret	194	(France) Sébastien Gimbert	Yamaha YZF-R1	14	Retirement	24	
Ret	111	(Spain) Ruben Xaus	Ducati 1098 RS 08	11	Retirement	11	
Ret	7	(Spain) Carlos Checa	Honda CBR1000RR	11	Retirement	13	
Ret	59	(Italy) Niccolò Canepa	Ducati 1098 F08	6	Retirement	6	
Ret	13	(Italy) Vittorio Iannuzzo	Kawasaki ZX-10R	6	Retirement	25	
Ret	86	(Italy) Ayrton Badovini	Kawasaki ZX-10R	5	Retirement	16	
Ret	113	(Czech Republic) Jiri Drazdak	Honda CBR1000RR	2	Accident	27	
Ret	55	(France) Régis Laconi	Kawasaki ZX-10R	1	Accident	21	

== Supersport race classification ==
Pos	No	Rider	Bike	Laps	Time	Grid	Points
1	65	(United Kingdom) Jonathan Rea	Honda CBR600RR	18	37:35.093	7	25
2	88	(Australia) Andrew Pitt	Honda CBR600RR	18	+0.020	4	20
3	25	(Australia) Josh Brookes	Honda CBR600RR	18	+1.433	3	16
4	23	(Australia) Broc Parkes	Yamaha YZF-R6	18	+1.853	1	13
5	77	(Netherlands) Barry Veneman	Suzuki GSX-R600	18	+2.237	2	11
6	69	(Italy) Gianluca Nannelli	Honda CBR600RR	18	+12.032	11	10
7	11	(Australia) Russell Holland	Honda CBR600RR	18	+12.221	10	9
8	14	(France) Matthieu Lagrive	Honda CBR600RR	18	+12.787	9	8
9	31	(Finland) Vesa Kallio	Honda CBR600RR	18	+15.334	8	7
10	55	(Italy) Massimo Roccoli	Yamaha YZF-R6	18	+15.780	17	6
11	9	(United Kingdom) Chris Walker	Kawasaki ZX-6R	18	+23.645	20	5
12	105	(Italy) Gianluca Vizziello	Honda CBR600RR	18	+23.758	19	4
13	47	(Italy) Ivan Clementi	Triumph 675	18	+24.074	18	3
14	83	(Belgium) Didier van Keymeulen	Suzuki GSX-R600	18	+24.621	12	2
15	44	(Spain) David Salom	Yamaha YZF-R6	18	+26.866	15	1
16	21	(Japan) Katsuaki Fujiwara	Kawasaki ZX-6R	18	+26.891	21	
17	199	(Italy) Danilo dell'Omo	Honda CBR600RR	18	+29.566	22	
18	26	(Spain) Joan Lascorz	Honda CBR600RR	18	+34.218	16	
19	34	(Hungary) Balázs Németh	Honda CBR600RR	18	+44.347	29	
20	117	(Italy) Denis Sacchetti	Honda CBR600RR	18	+44.650	26	
21	12	(Spain) Javier Hidalgo	Yamaha YZF-R6	18	+51.768	30	
22	8	(Australia) Mark Aitchison	Triumph 675	18	+54.336	6	
23	4	(Italy) Lorenzo Alfonsi	Honda CBR600RR	18	+54.351	27	
24	28	(Italy) Ruggero Scambia	Triumph 675	18	+1:28.911	32	
Ret	127	(Denmark) Robbin Harms	Honda CBR600RR	17	Retirement	14	
Ret	18	(United Kingdom) Craig Jones	Honda CBR600RR	16	Retirement	5	
Ret	38	(France) Gregory Leblanc	Honda CBR600RR	11	Retirement	13	
Ret	37	(San Marino) William de Angelis	Honda CBR600RR	9	Retirement	28	
Ret	51	(Spain) Santiago Barragan	Honda CBR600RR	3	Retirement	31	
Ret	17	(Portugal) Miguel Praia	Honda CBR600RR	0	Accident	25	
Ret	30	(Germany) Jesco Gunther	Honda CBR600RR	0	Accident	24	
Ret	81	(United Kingdom) Graeme Gowland	Honda CBR600RR	0	Accident	23	

== Superstock 1000 race classification ==
Pos	No	Rider	Bike	Laps	Time	Grid	Points
1	21	(France) Maxime Berger	Honda CBR1000RR	12	24:58.402	3	25
2	155	(Australia) Brendan Roberts	Ducati 1098R	12	+3.043	1	20
3	53	(Italy) Alessandro Polita	Ducati 1098R	12	+3.100	7	16
4	8	(Italy) Andrea Antonelli	Honda CBR1000RR	12	+3.367	6	13
5	19	(Belgium) Xavier Simeon	Suzuki GSX-R1000 K8	12	+5.709	4	11
6	51	(Italy) Michele Pirro	Yamaha YZF-R1	12	+10.032	2	10
7	23	(Australia) Chris Seaton	Suzuki GSX-R1000 K8	12	+13.380	10	9
8	96	(Czech Republic) Matěj Smrž	Honda CBR1000RR	12	+19.510	12	8
9	34	(Italy) Davide Giugliano	Suzuki GSX-R1000 K8	12	+19.724	18	7
10	119	(Italy) Michele Magnoni	Yamaha YZF-R1	12	+20.249	9	6
11	87	(Australia) Gareth Jones	Suzuki GSX-R1000 K8	12	+20.796	13	5
12	89	(Italy) Domenico Colucci	Ducati 1098R	12	+20.959	8	4
13	15	(Italy) Matteo Baiocco	Kawasaki ZX-10R	12	+21.042	11	3
14	16	(Netherlands) Raymond Schouten	Yamaha YZF-R1	12	+21.432	14	2
15	77	(United Kingdom) Barry Burrell	Honda CBR1000RR	12	+21.609	17	1
16	88	(France) Kenny Foray	Yamaha YZF-R1	12	+28.875	33	
17	30	(Switzerland) Michaël Savary	Suzuki GSX-R1000 K8	12	+28.942	21	
18	18	(United Kingdom) Matt Bond	Suzuki GSX-R1000 K8	12	+29.741	16	
19	7	(Austria) René Mähr	KTM 1190 RC8	12	+30.015	15	
20	78	(France) Freddy Foray	Suzuki GSX-R1000 K8	12	+36.569	19	
21	99	(Netherlands) Roy Ten Napel	Suzuki GSX-R1000 K8	12	+36.724	29	
22	81	(Finland) Pauli Pekkanen	KTM 1190 RC8	12	+38.541	31	
23	5	(Netherlands) Danny De Boer	Suzuki GSX-R1000 K8	12	+40.985	25	
24	14	(Sweden) Filip Backlund	Suzuki GSX-R1000 K8	12	+46.343	26	
25	92	(Slovenia) Jure Stibilj	Honda CBR1000RR	12	+48.163	30	
26	41	(Switzerland) Gregory Junod	Yamaha YZF-R1	12	+48.667	37	
27	24	(Slovenia) Marko Jerman	Honda CBR1000RR	12	+53.103	32	
28	12	(Italy) Alessio Aldrovandi	Kawasaki ZX-10R	12	+54.618	28	
29	120	(Poland) Marcin Walkowiak	Yamaha YZF-R1	12	+56.848	34	
30	91	(Poland) Marek Szkopek	Yamaha YZF-R1	12	+1:14.429	27	
NC	66	(Netherlands) Branko Srdanov	Yamaha YZF-R1	12	+1:48.627	38	
Ret	132	(France) Yoann Tiberio	Kawasaki ZX-10R	9	Retirement	23	
Ret	154	(Italy) Tomasso Lorenzetti	Suzuki GSX-R1000 K8	8	Retirement	20	
Ret	57	(Australia) Cameron Stronach	Kawasaki ZX-10R	6	Retirement	39	
Ret	90	(Czech Republic) Michal Drobný	Honda CBR1000RR	3	Accident	22	
Ret	84	(Italy) Federico Pica	Suzuki GSX-R1000 K8	3	Retirement	36	
Ret	996	(Italy) Jonathan Gallina	Kawasaki ZX-10R	3	Retirement	35	
Ret	71	(Italy) Claudio Corti	Yamaha YZF-R1	2	Retirement	5	
Ret	63	(Sweden) Per Björk	Honda CBR1000RR	0	Accident	24	
DNS	20	(France) Sylvain Barrier	Yamaha YZF-R1		Did not start		
DNS	35	(Germany) Dominic Lammert	Suzuki GSX-R1000 K8		Did not start		

== Superstock 600 race classification ==
Pos	No	Rider	Bike	Laps	Time	Grid	Points
1	77	(Czech Republic) Patrik Vostárek	Honda CBR600RR	9	19:12.257	1	25
2	65	(France) Loris Baz	Yamaha YZF-R6	9	+0.349	2	20
3	44	(United Kingdom) Gino Rea	Yamaha YZF-R6	9	+16.862	5	16
4	45	(United Kingdom) Dan Linfoot	Yamaha YZF-R6	9	+17.037	8	13
5	5	(Italy) Marco Bussolotti	Yamaha YZF-R6	9	+17.072	4	11
6	99	(United Kingdom) Gregg Black	Yamaha YZF-R6	9	+17.226	9	10
7	69	(Czech Republic) Ondřej Ježek	Kawasaki ZX-6R	9	+17.454	6	9
8	42	(Italy) Leonardo Biliotti	Honda CBR600RR	9	+22.382	10	8
9	18	(France) Nicolas Pouhair	Yamaha YZF-R6	9	+24.735	18	7
10	119	(Italy) Danilo Petrucci	Yamaha YZF-R6	9	+26.447	21	6
11	93	(France) Mathieu Lussiana	Yamaha YZF-R6	9	+26.856	22	5
12	12	(United Kingdom) Sam Lowes	Honda CBR600RR	9	+27.034	14	4
13	47	(Italy) Eddi La Marra	Suzuki GSX-R600	9	+29.155	11	3
14	11	(France) Jérémy Guarnoni	Yamaha YZF-R6	9	+29.539	16	2
15	72	(Norway) Fredrik Karlsen	Yamaha YZF-R6	9	+29.940	32	1
16	88	(Spain) Yannick Guerra	Yamaha YZF-R6	9	+38.480	27	
17	37	(Poland) Andrzej Chmielewski	Yamaha YZF-R6	9	+39.049	23	
18	56	(United Kingdom) David Paton	Honda CBR600RR	9	+39.202	24	
19	57	(Denmark) Kenny Tirsgaard	Suzuki GSX-R600	9	+39.869	31	
20	3	(Italy) Giuliano Gregorini	Honda CBR600RR	9	+42.812	26	
21	10	(Spain) Nacho Calero	Yamaha YZF-R6	9	+42.988	34	
22	66	(Poland) Mateusz Stoklosa	Honda CBR600RR	9	+43.312	30	
23	40	(Spain) Roman Ramos	Kawasaki ZX-6R	9	+43.688	28	
24	14	(Belgium) Nicolas Pirot	Yamaha YZF-R6	9	+43.708	29	
25	17	(United Kingdom) Robbie Stewart	Triumph 675	9	+49.752	33	
26	21	(United Kingdom) Alex Lowes	Kawasaki ZX-6R	9	+1:01.567	19	
Ret	24	(Italy) Daniele Beretta	Suzuki GSX-R600	8	Accident	7	
Ret	23	(Switzerland) Christian Von Gunten	Suzuki GSX-R600	8	Accident	20	
Ret	6	(Italy) Andrea Boscoscuro	Yamaha YZF-R6	7	Accident	12	
Ret	91	(Sweden) Hampus Johansson	Yamaha YZF-R6	7	Accident	25	
Ret	35	(Italy) Simone Grotzkyj	Honda CBR600RR	7	Accident	15	
Ret	7	(Italy) Renato Costantini	Yamaha YZF-R6	6	Accident	13	
Ret	111	(Czech Republic) Michal Šembera	Honda CBR600RR	6	Retirement	3	
Ret	55	(Belgium) Vincent Lonbois	Suzuki GSX-R600	4	Technical problem	17	
DNS	70	(United Kingdom) Thomas Grant	Triumph 675		Did not start		
DNS	96	(United Kingdom) Daniel Brill	Honda CBR600RR		Did not start		
