= 2008 Magny-Cours Superbike World Championship round =

(France) 2008 Magny-Cours Superbike World Championship round
Round details
- Round 13 of 14 rounds in the 2008 Superbike World Championship. and Round 12 of 13 rounds in the 2008 Supersport World Championship.
- Date: October 5, 2008
- Location: Circuit de Nevers Magny-Cours
- Course: Permanent racing facility 4.411 km (2.741 mi)

Superbike World Championship
Pole position
(Japan) Noriyuki Haga
1:38.444
Fastest lap race 1	Fastest lap race 2
(Spain) Carlos Checa	(Australia) Troy Bayliss
1:39.834	1:39.818

Supersport World Championship
Pole position
(Australia) Broc Parkes
1:41.543
Fastest lap
(Australia) Broc Parkes
1:42.593

The 2008 Magny-Cours Superbike World Championship round was the thirteenth round of the 2008 Superbike World Championship. It took place on the weekend of October 3-5, 2008, at the Circuit de Nevers Magny-Cours.

== Superbike race 1 classification ==
Pos	No	Rider	Bike	Laps	Time	Grid	Points
1	41	(Japan) Noriyuki Haga	Yamaha YZF-R1	23	38:33.367	1	25
2	10	(Spain) Fonsi Nieto	Suzuki GSX-R1000	23	+6.223	2	20
3	21	(Australia) Troy Bayliss	Ducati 1098 F08	23	+6.875	3	16
4	3	(Italy) Max Biaggi	Ducati 1098 RS 08	23	+7.237	8	13
5	76	(Germany) Max Neukirchner	Suzuki GSX-R1000	23	+8.925	6	11
6	11	(Australia) Troy Corser	Yamaha YZF-R1	23	+10.714	12	10
7	7	(Spain) Carlos Checa	Honda CBR1000RR	23	+16.176	4	9
8	34	(Japan) Yukio Kagayama	Suzuki GSX-R1000	23	+22.661	15	8
9	54	(Turkey) Kenan Sofuoğlu	Honda CBR1000RR	23	+27.224	14	7
10	36	(Spain) Gregorio Lavilla	Honda CBR1000RR	23	+31.300	16	6
11	55	(France) Régis Laconi	Kawasaki ZX-10R	23	+35.558	21	5
12	31	(Australia) Karl Muggeridge	Honda CBR1000RR	23	+35.774	18	4
13	194	(France) Sébastien Gimbert	Yamaha YZF-R1	23	+36.078	13	3
14	38	(Japan) Shinichi Nakatomi	Yamaha YZF-R1	23	+36.289	19	2
15	9	(United Kingdom) Chris Walker	Honda CBR1000RR	23	+40.472	23	1
16	86	(Italy) Ayrton Badovini	Kawasaki ZX-10R	23	+40.497	20	
17	32	(Austria) Martin Bauer	Honda CBR1000RR	23	+43.350	17	
18	100	(Japan) Makoto Tamada	Kawasaki ZX-10R	23	+54.263	22	
19	88	(Japan) Shuhei Aoyama	Honda CBR1000RR	23	+54.382	28	
20	69	(Spain) Ivan Silva	Honda CBR1000RR	23	+54.513	27	
Ret	96	(Czech Republic) Jakub Smrz	Ducati 1098 RS 08	22	Retirement	26	
Ret	73	(Austria) Christian Zaiser	Yamaha YZF-R1	21	Retirement	24	
Ret	57	(Italy) Lorenzo Lanzi	Ducati 1098 RS 08	20	Retirement	10	
Ret	84	(Italy) Michel Fabrizio	Ducati 1098 F08	19	Accident	9	
Ret	94	(Spain) David Checa	Yamaha YZF-R1	17	Retirement	7	
Ret	44	(Italy) Roberto Rolfo	Honda CBR1000RR	16	Retirement	5	
Ret	111	(Spain) Ruben Xaus	Ducati 1098 RS 08	14	Retirement	11	
Ret	13	(Italy) Vittorio Iannuzzo	Kawasaki ZX-10R	6	Retirement	25	

== Superbike race 2 classification ==
Pos	No	Rider	Bike	Laps	Time	Grid	Points
1	21	(Australia) Troy Bayliss	Ducati 1098 F08	23	38:33.579	3	25
2	41	(Japan) Noriyuki Haga	Yamaha YZF-R1	23	+0.909	1	20
3	11	(Australia) Troy Corser	Yamaha YZF-R1	23	+2.966	12	16
4	7	(Spain) Carlos Checa	Honda CBR1000RR	23	+7.175	4	13
5	111	(Spain) Ruben Xaus	Ducati 1098 RS 08	23	+12.822	11	11
6	3	(Italy) Max Biaggi	Ducati 1098 RS 08	23	+13.004	8	10
7	34	(Japan) Yukio Kagayama	Suzuki GSX-R1000	23	+18.876	15	9
8	10	(Spain) Fonsi Nieto	Suzuki GSX-R1000	23	+19.512	2	8
9	76	(Germany) Max Neukirchner	Suzuki GSX-R1000	23	+19.627	6	7
10	44	(Italy) Roberto Rolfo	Honda CBR1000RR	23	+21.425	5	6
11	57	(Italy) Lorenzo Lanzi	Ducati 1098 RS 08	23	+25.133	10	5
12	36	(Spain) Gregorio Lavilla	Honda CBR1000RR	23	+30.538	16	4
13	96	(Czech Republic) Jakub Smrz	Ducati 1098 RS 08	23	+35.334	26	3
14	84	(Italy) Michel Fabrizio	Ducati 1098 F08	23	+38.453	9	2
15	9	(United Kingdom) Chris Walker	Honda CBR1000RR	23	+40.008	23	1
16	38	(Japan) Shinichi Nakatomi	Yamaha YZF-R1	23	+40.802	19	
17	86	(Italy) Ayrton Badovini	Kawasaki ZX-10R	23	+46.941	20	
18	100	(Japan) Makoto Tamada	Kawasaki ZX-10R	23	+50.172	22	
19	54	(Turkey) Kenan Sofuoğlu	Honda CBR1000RR	23	+58.616	14	
20	55	(France) Régis Laconi	Kawasaki ZX-10R	23	+1:00.422	21	
21	69	(Spain) Ivan Silva	Honda CBR1000RR	23	+1:02.852	27	
22	88	(Japan) Shuhei Aoyama	Honda CBR1000RR	23	+1:21.378	28	
23	13	(Italy) Vittorio Iannuzzo	Kawasaki ZX-10R	23	+1:32.289	25	
Ret	31	(Australia) Karl Muggeridge	Honda CBR1000RR	22	Retirement	18	
Ret	73	(Austria) Christian Zaiser	Yamaha YZF-R1	11	Retirement	24	
Ret	94	(Spain) David Checa	Yamaha YZF-R1	10	Accident	7	
Ret	194	(France) Sébastien Gimbert	Yamaha YZF-R1	4	Retirement	13	
Ret	32	(Austria) Martin Bauer	Honda CBR1000RR	3	Retirement	17	

== Supersport race classification ==
Pos	No	Rider	Bike	Laps	Time	Grid	Points
1	88	(Australia) Andrew Pitt	Honda CBR600RR	22	37:57.929	3	25
2	77	(Netherlands) Barry Veneman	Suzuki GSX-R600	22	+1.250	5	20
3	25	(Australia) Josh Brookes	Honda CBR600RR	22	+1.514	8	16
4	14	(France) Matthieu Lagrive	Honda CBR600RR	22	+1.685	13	13
5	83	(Belgium) Didier van Keymeulen	Suzuki GSX-R600	22	+5.075	4	11
6	55	(Italy) Massimo Roccoli	Yamaha YZF-R6	22	+13.171	9	10
7	69	(Italy) Gianluca Nannelli	Honda CBR600RR	22	+13.386	10	9
8	99	(France) Fabien Foret	Yamaha YZF-R6	22	+19.563	16	8
9	41	(United States) Josh Hayes	Honda CBR600RR	22	+19.677	19	7
10	65	(United Kingdom) Jonathan Rea	Honda CBR600RR	22	+21.686	2	6
11	105	(Italy) Gianluca Vizziello	Honda CBR600RR	22	+22.599	12	5
12	21	(Japan) Katsuaki Fujiwara	Kawasaki ZX-6R	22	+24.967	21	4
13	7	(Czech Republic) Patrik Vostárek	Honda CBR600RR	22	+28.888	20	3
14	47	(Italy) Ivan Clementi	Triumph 675	22	+29.351	14	2
15	127	(Denmark) Robbin Harms	Honda CBR600RR	22	+38.000	7	1
16	126	(United Kingdom) Chris Martin	Kawasaki ZX-6R	22	+40.934	28	
17	44	(Spain) David Salom	Yamaha YZF-R6	22	+43.876	18	
18	30	(Germany) Jesco Gunther	Honda CBR600RR	22	+46.230	22	
19	34	(Hungary) Balázs Németh	Honda CBR600RR	22	+58.762	25	
20	10	(France) David Perret	Honda CBR600RR	22	+59.258	27	
21	11	(Australia) Russell Holland	Honda CBR600RR	22	+1:01.131	15	
22	51	(Spain) Santiago Barragán	Honda CBR600RR	22	+1:14.306	30	
Ret	169	(France) Julien Enjolras	Yamaha YZF-R6	20	Accident	23	
Ret	74	(France) Thierry Mulot	Kawasaki ZX-6R	12	Retirement	29	
Ret	117	(Italy) Denis Sacchetti	Honda CBR600RR	11	Retirement	26	
Ret	23	(Australia) Broc Parkes	Yamaha YZF-R6	10	Retirement	1	
Ret	26	(Spain) Joan Lascorz	Honda CBR600RR	9	Retirement	6	
Ret	4	(Italy) Lorenzo Alfonsi	Honda CBR600RR	5	Retirement	24	
Ret	17	(Portugal) Miguel Praia	Honda CBR600RR	0	Accident	17	

== Superstock 1000 race classification ==
Pos	No	Rider	Bike	Laps	Time	Grid	Points
1	96	(Czech Republic) Matěj Smrž	Honda CBR1000RR	14	24:07.794	1	25
2	78	(France) Freddy Foray	Suzuki GSX-R1000 K8	14	+0.463	2	20
3	71	(Italy) Claudio Corti	Yamaha YZF-R1	14	+0.543	4	16
4	53	(Italy) Alessandro Polita	Ducati 1098R	14	+1.001	8	13
5	19	(Belgium) Xavier Simeon	Suzuki GSX-R1000 K8	14	+1.792	3	11
6	74	(France) Julien Millet	Yamaha YZF-R1	14	+2.556	6	10
7	20	(France) Sylvain Barrier	Yamaha YZF-R1	14	+8.425	10	9
8	88	(France) Kenny Foray	Yamaha YZF-R1	14	+8.701	11	8
9	30	(Switzerland) Michaël Savary	Suzuki GSX-R1000 K8	14	+12.636	19	7
10	51	(Italy) Michele Pirro	Yamaha YZF-R1	14	+12.776	9	6
11	21	(France) Maxime Berger	Honda CBR1000RR	14	+14.352	7	5
12	23	(Australia) Chris Seaton	Suzuki GSX-R1000 K8	14	+22.002	14	4
13	89	(Italy) Domenico Colucci	Ducati 1098R	14	+23.114	12	3
14	77	(United Kingdom) Barry Burrell	Honda CBR1000RR	14	+23.739	18	2
15	34	(Italy) Davide Giugliano	Suzuki GSX-R1000 K8	14	+27.654	16	1
16	16	(Netherlands) Raymond Schouten	Yamaha YZF-R1	14	+27.893	20	
17	87	(Australia) Gareth Jones	Suzuki GSX-R1000 K8	14	+28.672	23	
18	8	(Italy) Andrea Antonelli	Honda CBR1000RR	14	+29.861	25	
19	14	(Sweden) Filip Backlund	Suzuki GSX-R1000 K8	14	+31.655	21	
20	155	(Australia) Brendan Roberts	Ducati 1098R	14	+39.173	5	
21	60	(United Kingdom) Peter Hickman	Yamaha YZF-R1	14	+42.859	24	
22	81	(Finland) Pauli Pekkanen	KTM 1190 RC8	14	+43.156	32	
23	18	(United Kingdom) Matt Bond	Suzuki GSX-R1000 K8	14	+43.591	26	
24	24	(Slovenia) Marko Jerman	Honda CBR1000RR	14	+49.153	30	
25	107	(Italy) Niccolò Rosso	Honda CBR1000RR	14	+50.458	38	
26	41	(Switzerland) Gregory Junod	Yamaha YZF-R1	14	+53.215	31	
27	92	(Slovenia) Jure Stibilj	Honda CBR1000RR	14	+1:01.096	37	
28	154	(Italy) Tommaso Lorenzetti	Suzuki GSX-R1000 K8	14	+1:03.390	33	
29	99	(Netherlands) Roy Ten Napel	Suzuki GSX-R1000 K8	14	+1:04.057	22	
30	26	(Italy) Andrea Liberini	Suzuki GSX-R1000 K8	14	+1:09.566	35	
31	5	(Netherlands) Danny De Boer	Suzuki GSX-R1000 K8	14	+1:09.815	28	
32	66	(Netherlands) Branko Srdanov	Yamaha YZF-R1	14	+1:10.142	36	
33	90	(Czech Republic) Michal Drobný	Honda CBR1000RR	14	+1:12.430	34	
34	57	(Australia) Cameron Stronach	Kawasaki ZX-10R	14	+1:26.143	40	
35	11	(Spain) Javier Oliver	Yamaha YZF-R1	14	+1:32.485	39	
Ret	119	(Italy) Michele Magnoni	Yamaha YZF-R1	13	Retirement	13	
Ret	132	(France) Yoann Tiberio	Kawasaki ZX-10R	11	Retirement	29	
Ret	7	(Austria) René Mähr	KTM 1190 RC8	4	Retirement	15	
Ret	15	(Italy) Matteo Baiocco	Kawasaki ZX-10R	1	Accident	17	
Ret	56	(France) Loïc Napoleone	Yamaha YZF-R1	1	Accident	27	
DNQ	58	(Italy) Robert Gianfardoni	Ducati 1098R		Did not qualify		
OFFICIAL SUPERSTOCK 1000 RACE REPORT

== Superstock 600 race classification ==
Pos	No	Rider	Bike	Laps	Time	Grid	Points
1	45	(United Kingdom) Dan Linfoot	Yamaha YZF-R6	10	17:44.716	7	25
2	65	(France) Loris Baz	Yamaha YZF-R6	10	+0.232	5	20
3	94	(France) Mathieu Gines	Yamaha YZF-R6	10	+0.392	4	16
4	55	(Belgium) Vincent Lonbois	Suzuki GSX-R600	10	+0.616	6	13
5	5	(Italy) Marco Bussolotti	Yamaha YZF-R6	10	+1.091	2	11
6	44	(United Kingdom) Gino Rea	Yamaha YZF-R6	10	+1.734	1	10
7	24	(Italy) Daniele Beretta	Suzuki GSX-R600	10	+3.377	12	9
8	99	(United Kingdom) Gregg Black	Yamaha YZF-R6	10	+14.671	11	8
9	57	(Denmark) Kenny Tirsgaard	Suzuki GSX-R600	10	+14.747	17	7
10	155	(France) Etienne Mason	Yamaha YZF-R6	10	+14.927	21	6
11	119	(Italy) Danilo Petrucci	Yamaha YZF-R6	10	+15.117	9	5
12	11	(France) Jérémy Guarnoni	Yamaha YZF-R6	10	+21.192	13	4
13	88	(Spain) Yannick Guerra	Yamaha YZF-R6	10	+24.562	18	3
14	7	(Italy) Renato Costantini	Yamaha YZF-R6	10	+25.432	16	2
15	111	(Czech Republic) Michal Šembera	Honda CBR600RR	10	+25.905	15	1
16	18	(France) Nicolas Pouhair	Yamaha YZF-R6	10	+28.752	19	
17	42	(Italy) Leonardo Biliotti	Honda CBR600RR	10	+29.281	22	
18	64	(United States) Josh Day	Honda CBR600RR	10	+29.615	20	
19	36	(Italy) Davide Fanelli	Triumph 675	10	+39.805	28	
20	23	(Switzerland) Christian Von Gunten	Suzuki GSX-R600	10	+39.897	24	
21	21	(United Kingdom) Alex Lowes	Kawasaki ZX-6R	10	+42.536	14	
22	12	(United Kingdom) Sam Lowes	Honda CBR600RR	10	+46.971	27	
23	92	(Netherlands) Willem Hommersom	Honda CBR600RR	10	+1:00.019	33	
24	66	(Poland) Mateusz Stoklosa	Yamaha YZF-R6	9	+1 lap	32	
Ret	13	(United Kingdom) Lee Johnston	Honda CBR600RR	7	Retirement	26	
Ret	72	(Norway) Fredrik Karlsen	Yamaha YZF-R6	1	Retirement	25	
Ret	61	(France) Anthony Loiseau	Honda CBR600RR	1	Retirement	8	
Ret	14	(Belgium) Nicolas Pirot	Yamaha YZF-R6	0	Accident	30	
Ret	10	(Spain) Nacho Calero	Yamaha YZF-R6	0	Accident	31	
Ret	93	(France) Mathieu Lussiana	Yamaha YZF-R6	0	Accident	10	
Ret	91	(Sweden) Hampus Johansson	Yamaha YZF-R6	0	Accident	23	
Ret	47	(Italy) Eddi La Marra	Suzuki GSX-R600	0	Accident	29	
Ret	4	(France) Baptiste Guittet	Triumph 675	0	Accident	3	
DNQ	29	(France) William Grarre	Yamaha YZF-R6		Did not qualify		
WD	3	(Italy) Giuliano Gregorini	Honda CBR600RR		Withdrew		
