= 2008 Assen Superbike World Championship round =

(Netherlands) 2008 Assen Superbike World Championship round
Round details
- Round 4 of 14 rounds in the 2008 Superbike World Championship. and Round 3 of 13 rounds in the 2008 Supersport World Championship.
- Date: April 27, 2008
- Location: Assen
- Course: Permanent racing facility 4.555 km (2.830 mi)

Superbike World Championship
Pole position
(Australia) Troy Bayliss
1:38.428
Fastest lap race 1	Fastest lap race 2
(Germany) Max Neukirchner	(Australia) Troy Bayliss
1:39.395	1:39.562

Supersport World Championship
Pole position
(Australia) Broc Parkes
1:40.895
Fastest lap
(Italy) Gianluca Vizziello
1:42.130

The 2008 Assen Superbike World Championship round was the 4th round of the 2008 Superbike World Championship. It took place on the weekend of April 25–27, 2008, at the TT Circuit Assen located in Assen, Netherlands.

== Superbike race 1 classification ==
Pos.	No.	Rider	Bike	Laps	Time/Retired	Grid	Points
1	21	(Australia) Troy Bayliss	Ducati 1098 F08	22	36:50.907	1	25
2	7	(Spain) Carlos Checa	Honda CBR1000RR	22	+2.132	6	20
3	76	(Germany) Max Neukirchner	Suzuki GSX-R1000	22	+2.179	5	16
4	34	(Japan) Yukio Kagayama	Suzuki GSX-R1000	22	+10.919	7	13
5	11	(Australia) Troy Corser	Yamaha YZF-R1	22	+11.051	4	11
6	96	(Czech Republic) Jakub Smrž	Ducati 1098 RS 08	22	+11.979	8	10
7	23	(Japan) Ryuichi Kiyonari	Honda CBR1000RR	22	+15.184	13	9
8	100	(Japan) Makoto Tamada	Kawasaki ZX-10R	22	+18.395	10	8
9	36	(Spain) Gregorio Lavilla	Honda CBR1000RR	22	+18.634	15	7
10	3	(Italy) Max Biaggi	Ducati 1098 RS 08	22	+20.699	17	6
11	55	(France) Régis Laconi	Kawasaki ZX-10R	22	+25.759	11	5
12	54	(Turkey) Kenan Sofuoğlu	Honda CBR1000RR	22	+26.064	20	4
13	86	(Italy) Ayrton Badovini	Kawasaki ZX-10R	22	+35.582	19	3
14	31	(Australia) Karl Muggeridge	Honda CBR1000RR	22	+36.266	18	2
15	38	(Japan) Shinichi Nakatomi	Yamaha YZF-R1	22	+37.215	16	1
16	111	(Spain) Rubén Xaus	Ducati 1098 RS 08	22	+37.286	3	
17	194	(France) Sébastien Gimbert	Yamaha YZF-R1	22	+39.037	22	
18	83	(Australia) Russell Holland	Honda CBR1000RR	22	+45.162	23	
19	88	(Japan) Shuhei Aoyama	Honda CBR1000RR	22	+1:04.895	25	
20	28	(Netherlands) Arie Vos	Ducati 1098 RS 08	22	+1:05.022	24	
21	77	(France) Loïc Napoleone	Yamaha YZF-R1	22	+1:22.777	28	
22	44	(Italy) Roberto Rolfo	Honda CBR1000RR	20	+2 laps	21	
Ret	84	(Italy) Michel Fabrizio	Ducati 1098 F08	9	Accident	12	
Ret	10	(Spain) Fonsi Nieto	Suzuki GSX-R1000	9	Retirement	9	
Ret	94	(Spain) David Checa	Yamaha YZF-R1	6	Accident	14	
Ret	22	(Italy) Luca Morelli	Honda CBR1000RR	6	Retirement	26	
Ret	41	(Japan) Noriyuki Haga	Yamaha YZF-R1	1	Accident	2	
DNS	13	(Italy) Vittorio Iannuzzo	Kawasaki ZX-10R	0	Did not start	27	
DNS	57	(Italy) Lorenzo Lanzi	Ducati 1098 RS 08		Did not start		

== Superbike race 2 classification ==
Pos.	No.	Rider	Bike	Laps	Time/Retired	Grid	Points
1	21	(Australia) Troy Bayliss	Ducati 1098 F08	22	36:46.238	1	25
2	41	(Japan) Noriyuki Haga	Yamaha YZF-R1	22	+0.082	2	20
3	7	(Spain) Carlos Checa	Honda CBR1000RR	22	+6.336	6	16
4	111	(Spain) Rubén Xaus	Ducati 1098 RS 08	22	+7.575	3	13
5	76	(Germany) Max Neukirchner	Suzuki GSX-R1000	22	+8.011	5	11
6	34	(Japan) Yukio Kagayama	Suzuki GSX-R1000	22	+13.999	7	10
7	36	(Spain) Gregorio Lavilla	Honda CBR1000RR	22	+15.215	14	9
8	96	(Czech Republic) Jakub Smrž	Ducati 1098 RS 08	22	+16.376	8	8
9	100	(Japan) Makoto Tamada	Kawasaki ZX-10R	22	+17.269	10	7
10	11	(Australia) Troy Corser	Yamaha YZF-R1	22	+18.380	4	6
11	10	(Spain) Fonsi Nieto	Suzuki GSX-R1000	22	+18.926	9	5
12	3	(Italy) Max Biaggi	Ducati 1098 RS 08	22	+21.452	16	4
13	31	(Australia) Karl Muggeridge	Honda CBR1000RR	22	+23.794	17	3
14	44	(Italy) Roberto Rolfo	Honda CBR1000RR	22	+29.847	20	2
15	38	(Japan) Shinichi Nakatomi	Yamaha YZF-R1	22	+30.252	15	1
16	55	(France) Régis Laconi	Kawasaki ZX-10R	22	+31.249	11	
17	194	(France) Sébastien Gimbert	Yamaha YZF-R1	22	+31.328	21	
18	86	(Italy) Ayrton Badovini	Kawasaki ZX-10R	22	+39.814	18	
19	54	(Turkey) Kenan Sofuoğlu	Honda CBR1000RR	22	+49.956	19	
20	83	(Australia) Russell Holland	Honda CBR1000RR	22	+51.554	22	
21	88	(Japan) Shuhei Aoyama	Honda CBR1000RR	22	+51.642	24	
22	77	(France) Loïc Napoleone	Yamaha YZF-R1	22	+1:02.682	26	
23	28	(Netherlands) Arie Vos	Ducati 1098 RS 08	22	+1:02.729	23	
Ret	84	(Italy) Michel Fabrizio	Ducati 1098 F08	10	Retirement	12	
Ret	23	(Japan) Ryuichi Kiyonari	Honda CBR1000RR	8	Retirement	13	
Ret	22	(Italy) Luca Morelli	Honda CBR1000RR	4	Retirement	25	
DNS	94	(Spain) David Checa	Yamaha YZF-R1		Did not start		
DNS	13	(Italy) Vittorio Iannuzzo	Kawasaki ZX-10R		Did not start		
DNS	57	(Italy) Lorenzo Lanzi	Ducati 1098 RS 08		Did not start		

== Supersport race classification ==
Pos.	No.	Rider	Bike	Laps	Time/Retired	Grid	Points
1	88	(Australia) Andrew Pitt	Honda CBR600RR	21	36:10.751	9	25
2	65	(United Kingdom) Jonathan Rea	Honda CBR600RR	21	+0.014	2	20
3	26	(Spain) Joan Lascorz	Honda CBR600RR	21	+0.150	5	16
4	99	(France) Fabien Foret	Yamaha YZF-R6	21	+0.201	4	13
5	23	(Australia) Broc Parkes	Yamaha YZF-R6	21	+0.283	1	11
6	25	(Australia) Josh Brookes	Honda CBR600RR	21	+0.447	7	10
7	77	(Netherlands) Barry Veneman	Suzuki GSX-R600	21	+2.050	8	9
8	105	(Italy) Gianluca Vizziello	Honda CBR600RR	21	+2.346	14	8
9	18	(United Kingdom) Craig Jones	Honda CBR600RR	21	+2.714	3	7
10	14	(France) Matthieu Lagrive	Honda CBR600RR	21	+3.073	16	6
11	8	(Australia) Mark Aitchison	Triumph 675	21	+4.070	22	5
12	9	(United Kingdom) Chris Walker	Kawasaki ZX-6R	21	+4.863	20	4
13	127	(Denmark) Robbin Harms	Honda CBR600RR	21	+5.088	17	3
14	47	(Italy) Ivan Clementi	Triumph 675	21	+16.644	6	2
15	57	(Italy) Ilario Dionisi	Triumph 675	21	+21.630	19	1
16	44	(Spain) David Salom	Yamaha YZF-R6	21	+27.619	13	
17	17	(Portugal) Miguel Praia	Honda CBR600RR	21	+27.773	24	
18	31	(Finland) Vesa Kallio	Honda CBR600RR	21	+27.898	21	
19	81	(United Kingdom) Graeme Gowland	Honda CBR600RR	21	+39.320	27	
20	32	(Italy) Mirko Giansanti	Honda CBR600RR	21	+39.321	28	
21	101	(United Kingdom) Kev Coghlan	Honda CBR600RR	21	+41.111	32	
22	199	(Italy) Danilo Dell'Omo	Honda CBR600RR	21	+46.341	26	
23	4	(Italy) Lorenzo Alfonsi	Honda CBR600RR	21	+48.878	29	
24	63	(Netherlands) Ron van Steenbergen	Honda CBR600RR	21	+56.714	35	
25	51	(Spain) Santiago Barragán	Honda CBR600RR	21	+57.194	34	
26	71	(Netherlands) Jurjen Uitterdijk	Yamaha YZF-R6	21	+1:07.115	31	
27	37	(San Marino) William De Angelis	Honda CBR600RR	21	+1:08.851	30	
Ret	83	(Belgium) Didier Van Keymeulen	Suzuki GSX-R600	19	Retirement	23	
Ret	69	(Italy) Gianluca Nannelli	Honda CBR600RR	16	Retirement	11	
Ret	21	(Japan) Katsuaki Fujiwara	Kawasaki ZX-6R	14	Retirement	18	
Ret	38	(France) Grégory Leblanc	Honda CBR600RR	12	Retirement	25	
Ret	24	(Australia) Garry McCoy	Triumph 675	12	Retirement	15	
Ret	75	(Slovenia) Luka Nedog	Honda CBR600RR	11	Retirement	33	
Ret	147	(Spain) Ángel Rodríguez	Yamaha YZF-R6	8	Accident	12	
Ret	55	(Italy) Massimo Roccoli	Yamaha YZF-R6	1	Accident	10	
Ret	121	(France) Arnaud Vincent	Kawasaki ZX-6R	0	Retirement	36	

== Superstock 1000 race classification ==
Pos.	No.	Rider	Bike	Laps	Time/Retired	Grid	Points
1	21	(France) Maxime Berger	Honda CBR1000RR	13	22:24.450	2	25
2	51	(Italy) Michele Pirro	Yamaha YZF-R1	13	+0.904	3	20
3	19	(Belgium) Xavier Simeon	Suzuki GSX-R1000 K8	13	+2.848	4	16
4	53	(Italy) Alessandro Polita	Ducati 1098R	13	+4.811	9	13
5	8	(Italy) Andrea Antonelli	Honda CBR1000RR	13	+5.481	10	11
6	16	(Netherlands) Raymond Schouten	Yamaha YZF-R1	13	+9.544	7	10
7	96	(Czech Republic) Matěj Smrž	Honda CBR1000RR	13	+16.932	7	9
8	34	(Italy) Davide Giugliano	Suzuki GSX-R1000 K8	13	+17.289	8	8
9	88	(France) Kenny Foray	Yamaha YZF-R1	13	+17.672	20	7
10	33	(Estonia) Marko Rohtlaan	Honda CBR1000RR	13	+19.588	26	6
11	89	(Italy) Domenico Colucci	Ducati 1098R	13	+19.898	21	5
12	15	(Italy) Matteo Baiocco	Kawasaki ZX-10R	13	+23.074	15	4
13	5	(Netherlands) Danny De Boer	Suzuki GSX-R1000 K8	13	+25.288	23	3
14	87	(Australia) Gareth Jones	Suzuki GSX-R1000 K8	13	+25.595	28	2
15	132	(France) Yoann Tiberio	Kawasaki ZX-10R	13	+29.279	16	1
16	7	(Austria) René Mähr	KTM 1190 RC8	13	+30.097	19	
17	111	(Italy) Fabrizio Perotti	Suzuki GSX-R1000 K8	13	+31.915	25	
18	41	(Switzerland) Gregory Junod	Yamaha YZF-R1	13	+37.255	24	
19	117	(Italy) Denis Sacchetti	Ducati 1098R	13	+38.303	24	
20	67	(Netherlands) Ronald Ter Braake	Ducati 1098R	13	+40.461	30	
21	18	(United Kingdom) Matt Bond	Suzuki GSX-R1000 K8	13	+43.350	33	
22	14	(Sweden) Filip Backlund	Suzuki GSX-R1000 K8	13	+43.670	35	
23	12	(Italy) Alessio Aldrovandi	Kawasaki ZX-10R	13	+50.506	29	
24	23	(Australia) Chris Seaton	Suzuki GSX-R1000 K8	13	+1:00.735	13	
25	996	(Italy) Jonathan Gallina	Kawasaki ZX-10R	13	+1:03.921	32	
26	66	(Netherlands) Branko Srdanov	Yamaha YZF-R1	13	+1:07.940	39	
27	57	(Australia) Cameron Stronach	Kawasaki ZX-10R	13	+1:11.125	38	
28	24	(Slovenia) Marko Jerman	Honda CBR1000RR	13	+1:21.703	31	
29	58	(Italy) Robert Gianfardoni	Ducati 1098R	13	+1:23.089	40	
Ret	90	(Czech Republic) Michal Drobný	Honda CBR1000RR	12	Accident	34	
Ret	92	(Slovenia) Jure Stibilj	Honda CBR1000RR	10	Accident	37	
Ret	71	(Italy) Claudio Corti	Yamaha YZF-R1	9	Accident	1	
Ret	20	(France) Sylvain Barrier	Yamaha YZF-R1	9	Accident	14	
Ret	99	(Netherlands) Roy Ten Napel	Suzuki GSX-R1000 K8	9	Accident	11	
Ret	77	(United Kingdom) Barry Burrell	Honda CBR1000RR	8	Accident	12	
Ret	78	(France) Freddy Foray	Suzuki GSX-R1000 K8	6	Accident	22	
Ret	30	(Switzerland) Michaël Savary	Suzuki GSX-R1000 K8	6	Accident	18	
Ret	29	(Italy) Davide Bastianelli	Suzuki GSX-R1000 K8	6	Retirement	36	
Ret	155	(Australia) Brendan Roberts	Ducati 1098R	4	Accident	5	
Ret	119	(Italy) Michele Magnoni	Yamaha YZF-R1	2	Accident	6	

== Superstock 600 race classification ==
Pos.	No.	Rider	Bike	Laps	Time/Retired	Grid	Points
1	45	(United Kingdom) Dan Linfoot	Yamaha YZF-R6	10	17:40.133	5	25
2	77	(Czech Republic) Patrik Vostárek	Honda CBR600RR	10	+3.188	2	20
3	55	(Belgium) Vincent Lonbois	Suzuki GSX-R600	10	+5.707	12	16
4	24	(Italy) Daniele Beretta	Suzuki GSX-R600	10	+6.454	9	13
5	65	(France) Loris Baz	Yamaha YZF-R6	10	+7.023	3	11
6	99	(United Kingdom) Gregg Black	Yamaha YZF-R6	10	+10.874	6	10
7	5	(Italy) Marco Bussolotti	Yamaha YZF-R6	10	+15.993	11	9
8	47	(Italy) Eddi La Marra	Suzuki GSX-R600	10	+16.151	13	8
9	44	(United Kingdom) Gino Rea	Yamaha YZF-R6	10	+16.252	8	7
10	72	(Norway) Fredrik Karlsen	Yamaha YZF-R6	10	+17.718	20	6
11	91	(Sweden) Hampus Johansson	Yamaha YZF-R6	10	+18.070	19	5
12	56	(United Kingdom) David Paton	Honda CBR600RR	10	+18.708	14	4
13	6	(Italy) Andrea Boscoscuro	Kawasaki ZX-6R	10	+21.267	16	3
14	57	(Denmark) Kenny Tirsgaard	Suzuki GSX-R600	10	+21.336	15	2
15	93	(France) Mathieu Lussiana	Yamaha YZF-R6	10	+29.133	18	1
16	18	(France) Nicolas Pouhair	Yamaha YZF-R6	10	+29.769	28	
17	17	(United Kingdom) Robbie Stewart	Triumph 675	10	+30.058	21	
18	96	(United Kingdom) Daniel Brill	Honda CBR600RR	10	+31.907	22	
19	10	(Spain) Nacho Calero	Yamaha YZF-R6	10	+35.958	29	
20	11	(France) Jérémy Guarnoni	Yamaha YZF-R6	10	+36.572	23	
21	88	(Spain) Yannick Guerra	Yamaha YZF-R6	10	+36.885	26	
22	14	(Belgium) Nicolas Pirot	Yamaha YZF-R6	10	+40.162	27	
23	23	(Switzerland) Christian Von Gunten	Suzuki GSX-R600	10	+45.757	30	
24	3	(Italy) Giuliano Gregorini	Honda CBR600RR	10	+45.858	25	
Ret	12	(United Kingdom) Sam Lowes	Honda CBR600RR	8	Accident	7	
Ret	21	(United Kingdom) Alex Lowes	Kawasaki ZX-6R	6	Retirement	17	
Ret	19	(Netherlands) Nigel Walraven	Suzuki GSX-R600	6	Retirement	31	
Ret	22	(Netherlands) Sveti Alexandrov	Yamaha YZF-R6	2	Technical problem	24	
Ret	42	(Italy) Leonardo Biliotti	Honda CBR600RR	1	Retirement	4	
Ret	111	(Czech Republic) Michal Šembera	Honda CBR600RR	0	Accident	10	
Ret	119	(Italy) Danilo Petrucci	Yamaha YZF-R6	0	Accident	1	
WD	7	(Italy) Renato Costantini	Yamaha YZF-R6		Withdrew		
WD	15	(Italy) Simone Grotzkyj	Honda CBR600RR		Withdrew		
WD	70	(United Kingdom) Thomas Grant	Triumph 675		Withdrew		
