= Joan Lascorz =

Spanish motorcycle racer

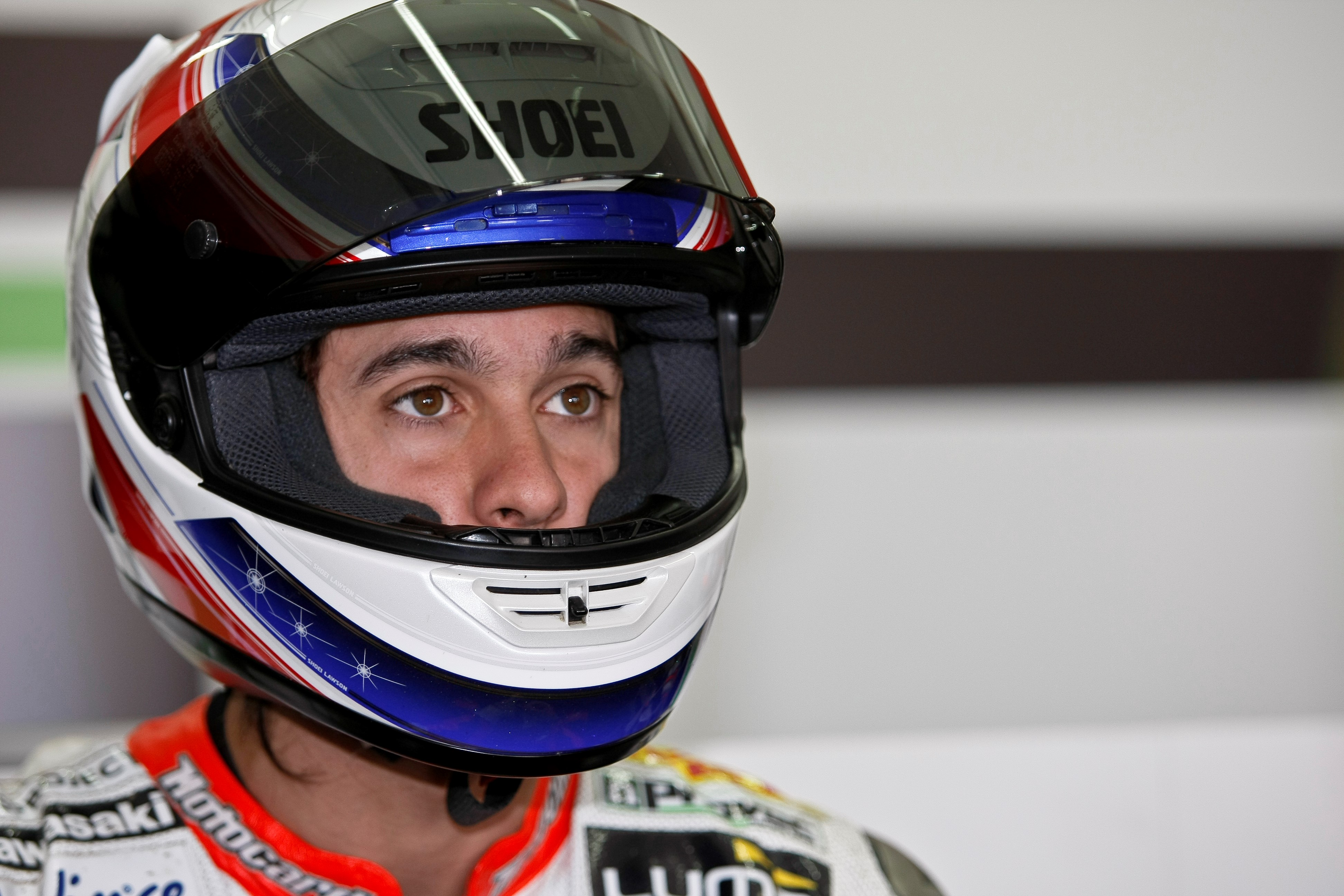
- Joan "Jumbo" Lascorz
- Nationality: Spanish
- Born: 27 February 1985 (age 41); Hospitalet de Llobregat, Barcelona
- Website: joanlascorz.com
Motorcycle racing career statistics
Superbike World Championship
Active years	2011–2012
Manufacturers	Kawasaki
Starts / Wins / Podiums / Poles / F. laps / Points; 30 / 0 / 0 / 0 / 1 / 178
Supersport World Championship
Active years	2005–2010
Manufacturers	Honda, Kawasaki
Starts / Wins / Podiums / Poles / F. laps / Points; 52 / 3 / 19 / 3 / 3 / 490

Joan Lascorz Moreno (born 27 February 1985) is a Spanish former motorcycle racer. He competed in the Supersport World Championship from 2005 to 2010, and in the Superbike World Championship in 2011 and 2012.

== Racing career ==
Born in L'Hospitalet de Llobregat near Barcelona, Lascorz won the 1995 Catalan Pocket Bike Championship. He raced scooters and 125ccs in his home country, before switching back to Supermoto for 2004, winning the Spanish Championship in this field. He concentrated fully on Supersport after this, having two successful seasons in the domestic championship on Hondas.

Lascorz and his Glaner Motocard.com team moved up to World Supersport for 2007. Lascorz and the team took time to adjust and were only 18th overall despite a podium finish at Vallelunga. He started 2008 with a bang, finishing second in the season opener in Losail, Qatar (briefly leading on the run to the line, before the more-powerful factory bike of Broc Parkes overtook him) before winning the season's third race at Valencia to briefly lead the championship, after most other major contenders had at least one non-finish in the first three races. The works Honda and Yamaha teams ultimately overhauled him in the standings, and he finished fifth overall after a further podium at the final round.

For 2009, Lascorz and the Motocard team gained factory Kawasaki support, with Katsuaki Fujiwara joining the team and support from former race winner Pere Riba. He scored four podiums, and also led at Imola when the engine failed.

Lascorz and Fujiwara remained with the team for 2010. A championship challenge against the Hondas of Eugene Laverty and Kenan Sofuoğlu was mounted early on, but a collision with Laverty and Roberto Tamburini at the start at Silverstone left him with multiple injuries.

In 2011, Lascorz moved to Superbike World Championship with Kawasaki finishing in 11th position in the championship overall.

After a good start to the 2012 Superbike World Championship, Lascorz was involved in a serious accident in post-race testing at the Autodromo Enzo e Dino Ferrari, which involved Lascorz crashing into an unprotected concrete wall near the track at nearly 200 km/h. Despite the best efforts of multiple medical teams, Kawasaki Racing Team released an update in August 2012 confirming what many initially expected- Lascorz had been paralysed, and will be unable to walk again. Commenting on his injuries, Lascorz stated that "What happened to me is a shame. I’m not sure if it was bad luck or that conditions in Imola were not suitable for a 240 HP bike. In any case, it is undoubtedly a full stop for my career as a SBK racer, and a period in my life. It's a very difficult situation and I have to be very strong to go ahead. I want to thank for the endless support I'm getting: all motorcycle riders both in SBK and MotoGP, and all the other categories. I also want to thank all the racing fans, and the amateur and professional bikers that have shown me examples of their affection."

In 2013, Lascorz joined a team of sports commentators, and he covered the World Superbikes series on the Spanish television.

== Career statistics ==
=== Supersport World Championship ===
Year	Bike	1	2	3	4	5	6	7	8	9	10	11	12	13	14	Pos.	Pts
2005	Honda	QAT	AUS	SPA	ITA	EUR	SMR	CZE	GBR	NED	GER	ITA; 19	FRA			NC	0
2006	Honda	QAT	AUS	SPA	ITA	EUR	SMR	CZE	GBR	NED	GER	ITA; 20	FRA			NC	0
2007	Honda	QAT; Ret	AUS; Ret	EUR; Ret	SPA; 8	NED; Ret	ITA; 15	GBR; 15	SMR; 17	CZE; 17	GBR; 12	GER; 8	ITA; 3	FRA; 22		18th	38
2008	Honda	QAT; 2	AUS; 7	SPA; 1	NED; 3	ITA; 9	GER; 12	SMR; Ret	CZE; 18	GBR; 14	EUR; 7	ITA; 4	FRA; Ret	POR; 3		5th	121
2009	Kawasaki	AUS; 8	QAT; 13	SPA; 19	NED; 3	ITA; 2	RSA; 4	**USA**; 4	SMR; 4	GBR; 2	CZE; 3	GER; 3	ITA; Ret	FRA; 1	POR; Ret	4th	163
2010	Kawasaki	**AUS**; 2	POR; 2	SPA; 1	NED; 2	ITA; 3	RSA; 5	USA; 3	SMR; 2	**CZE**; 2	GBR; DNS	GER	ITA	FRA		**3rd**	**168**

=== Superbike World Championship ===
(key) (Races in bold indicate pole position) (Races in italics indicate fastest lap)

Year	Make	1		2		3		4		5		6		7		8		9		10		11		12		13		14		Pos.	Pts
Year	Make	R1	R2	R1	R2	R1	R2	R1	R2	R1	R2	R1	R2	R1	R2	R1	R2	R1	R2	R1	R2	R1	R2	R1	R2	R1	R2	R1	R2	Pos.	Pts
2011	Kawasaki	AUS; Ret	AUS; Ret	EUR; 10	EUR; 5	NED; 11	NED; 12	ITA; Ret	ITA; 9	USA; 14	USA; 12	SMR; 9	SMR; 9	SPA; 7	SPA; 5	CZE; 9	CZE; 8	GBR; 7	GBR; Ret	GER; 7	GER; 11	ITA; 10	ITA; 8	FRA; 8	FRA; 7	POR; 5	POR; 8			11th	161
2012	Kawasaki	AUS; 15	AUS; Ret	ITA; 7	ITA; 9	NED	NED	ITA	ITA	EUR	EUR	USA	USA	SMR	SMR	SPA	SPA	CZE	CZE	GBR	GBR	RUS	RUS	GER	GER	POR	POR	FRA	FRA	23rd	17

=== British Superbike Championship ===
Year	Bike	1		2		3		4		5		6		7		8			9			10		11		12			Pos.	Pts	Ref
Year	Bike	R1	R2	R1	R2	R1	R2	R1	R2	R1	R2	R1	R2	R1	R2	R1	R2	R3	R1	R2	R3	R1	R2	R1	R2	R1	R2	R3	Pos.	Pts	Ref
2011	Kawasaki	BHI	BHI	OUL	OUL	CRO	CRO	THR	THR	KNO	KNO	SNE	SNE	OUL	OUL	BHGP; Ret	BHGP; 7	BHGP; 8	CAD	CAD	CAD	DON	DON	SIL	SIL	BHGP	BHGP	BHGP	24th	17	
