= 2008 Monza Superbike World Championship round =

(Italy) 2008 Monza Superbike World Championship round
Round details
- Round 5 of 14 rounds in the 2008 Superbike World Championship. and Round 5 of 13 rounds in the 2008 Supersport World Championship.
- Date: May 11, 2008
- Location: Monza
- Course: Permanent racing facility 5.793 km (3.600 mi)

Superbike World Championship
Pole position
(Australia) Troy Bayliss
1:44.931
Fastest lap race 1	Fastest lap race 2
(Japan) Noriyuki Haga	(Japan) Noriyuki Haga
1:45.882	1:46.363

Supersport World Championship
Pole position
(Australia) Broc Parkes
1:49.868
Fastest lap
(France) Fabien Foret
1:50.430

The 2008 Monza Superbike World Championship round was the fifth round of the 2008 Superbike World Championship. It took place on the weekend of May 9–11, 2008 at the Monza circuit.

== Superbike race 1 classification ==
Pos	No	Rider	Bike	Laps	Time	Grid	Points
1	76	(Germany) Max Neukirchner	Suzuki GSX-R1000	18	32:02.851	2	25
2	41	(Japan) Noriyuki Haga	Yamaha YZF-R1	18	+0.058	3	20
3	21	(Australia) Troy Bayliss	Ducati 1098 F08	18	+0.672	1	16
4	34	(Japan) Yukio Kagayama	Suzuki GSX-R1000	18	+0.771	5	13
5	3	(Italy) Max Biaggi	Ducati 1098 RS 08	18	+3.869	9	11
6	23	(Japan) Ryuichi Kiyonari	Honda CBR1000RR	18	+5.995	8	10
7	10	(Spain) Fonsi Nieto	Suzuki GSX-R1000	18	+8.788	7	9
8	7	(Spain) Carlos Checa	Honda CBR1000RR	18	+9.374	4	8
9	84	(Italy) Michel Fabrizio	Ducati 1098 F08	18	+10.667	13	7
10	96	(Czech Republic) Jakub Smrz	Ducati 1098 RS 08	18	+10.771	15	6
11	36	(Spain) Gregorio Lavilla	Honda CBR1000RR	18	+12.180	16	5
12	11	(Australia) Troy Corser	Yamaha YZF-R1	18	+14.719	12	4
13	38	(Japan) Shinichi Nakatomi	Yamaha YZF-R1	18	+32.734	17	3
14	57	(Italy) Lorenzo Lanzi	Ducati 1098 RS 08	18	+36.550	23	2
15	194	(France) Sébastien Gimbert	Yamaha YZF-R1	18	+36.607	19	1
16	83	(Australia) Russell Holland	Honda CBR1000RR	18	+52.464	22	
17	22	(Italy) Luca Morelli	Honda CBR1000RR	18	+56.929	24	
18	88	(Japan) Shuhei Aoyama	Honda CBR1000RR	18	+1:27.543	21	
19	49	(United States) Michael Beck	Yamaha YZF-R1	18	+1:28.342	28	
Ret	100	(Japan) Makoto Tamada	Kawasaki ZX-10R	16	Accident	14	
Ret	110	(Italy) Lorenzo Mauri	Ducati 999 RS	14	Retirement	25	
Ret	13	(Italy) Vittorio Iannuzzo	Kawasaki ZX-10R	13	Retirement	20	
Ret	86	(Italy) Ayrton Badovini	Kawasaki ZX-10R	8	Retirement	18	
Ret	111	(Spain) Ruben Xaus	Ducati 1098 RS 08	7	Accident	6	
Ret	55	(France) Régis Laconi	Kawasaki ZX-10R	3	Retirement	11	
Ret	77	(France) Loic Napoleone	Yamaha YZF-R1	1	Retirement	27	
Ret	31	(Australia) Karl Muggeridge	Honda CBR1000RR	0	Retirement	10	

== Superbike race 2 classification ==
Pos	No	Rider	Bike	Laps	Time	Grid	Points
1	41	(Japan) Noriyuki Haga	Yamaha YZF-R1	18	32:07.576	3	25
2	76	(Germany) Max Neukirchner	Suzuki GSX-R1000	18	+0.009	2	20
3	23	(Japan) Ryuichi Kiyonari	Honda CBR1000RR	18	+0.051	8	16
4	10	(Spain) Fonsi Nieto	Suzuki GSX-R1000	18	+4.489	7	13
5	84	(Italy) Michel Fabrizio	Ducati 1098 F08	18	+10.272	13	11
6	31	(Australia) Karl Muggeridge	Honda CBR1000RR	18	+10.376	10	10
7	111	(Spain) Ruben Xaus	Ducati 1098 RS 08	18	+10.496	6	9
8	11	(Australia) Troy Corser	Yamaha YZF-R1	18	+12.498	12	8
9	86	(Italy) Ayrton Badovini	Kawasaki ZX-10R	18	+19.429	18	7
10	36	(Spain) Gregorio Lavilla	Honda CBR1000RR	18	+26.373	16	6
11	57	(Italy) Lorenzo Lanzi	Ducati 1098 RS 08	18	+26.544	23	5
12	38	(Japan) Shinichi Nakatomi	Yamaha YZF-R1	18	+26.895	17	4
13	83	(Australia) Russell Holland	Honda CBR1000RR	18	+27.761	22	3
14	194	(France) Sébastien Gimbert	Yamaha YZF-R1	18	+29.661	19	2
15	49	(United States) Michael Beck	Yamaha YZF-R1	18	+1:29.001	28	1
16	88	(Japan) Shuhei Aoyama	Honda CBR1000RR	15	+3 Laps	21	
Ret	100	(Japan) Makoto Tamada	Kawasaki ZX-10R	17	Retirement	14	
Ret	3	(Italy) Max Biaggi	Ducati 1098 RS 08	15	Accident	9	
Ret	96	(Czech Republic) Jakub Smrz	Ducati 1098 RS 08	18	Accident	15	
Ret	7	(Spain) Carlos Checa	Honda CBR1000RR	9	Accident	4	
Ret	77	(France) Loic Napoleone	Yamaha YZF-R1	9	Retirement	27	
Ret	21	(Australia) Troy Bayliss	Ducati 1098 F08	8	Retirement	1	
Ret	55	(France) Régis Laconi	Kawasaki ZX-10R	6	Accident	11	
Ret	34	(Japan) Yukio Kagayama	Suzuki GSX-R1000	4	Accident	5	
Ret	13	(Italy) Vittorio Iannuzzo	Kawasaki ZX-10R	3	Retirement	20	
Ret	22	(Italy) Luca Morelli	Honda CBR1000RR	1	Retirement	24	

== Supersport race classification ==
Pos	No	Rider	Bike	Laps	Time	Grid	Points
1	99	(France) Fabien Foret	Yamaha YZF-R6	16	29:38.261	3	25
2	25	(Australia) Josh Brookes	Honda CBR600RR	16	+1.199	2	20
3	23	(Australia) Broc Parkes	Yamaha YZF-R6	16	+6.736	1	16
4	88	(Australia) Andrew Pitt	Honda CBR600RR	16	+11.398	7	13
5	127	(Denmark) Robbin Harms	Honda CBR600RR	16	+11.477	8	11
6	18	(United Kingdom) Craig Jones	Honda CBR600RR	16	+11.716	12	10
7	55	(Italy) Massimo Roccoli	Yamaha YZF-R6	16	+11.757	4	9
8	14	(France) Matthieu Lagrive	Honda CBR600RR	16	+12.186	9	8
9	26	(Spain) Joan Lascorz	Honda CBR600RR	16	+14.847	16	7
10	147	(Spain) Ángel Rodríguez	Yamaha YZF-R6	16	+15.175	14	6
11	8	(Australia) Mark Aitchison	Triumph 675	16	+21.256	10	5
12	13	(Italy) Cristiano Migliorati	Kawasaki ZX-6R	16	+24.899	17	4
13	69	(Italy) Gianluca Nannelli	Honda CBR600RR	16	+25.077	11	3
14	31	(Finland) Vesa Kallio	Honda CBR600RR	16	+25.160	18	2
15	21	(Japan) Katsuaki Fujiwara	Kawasaki ZX-6R	16	+26.429	13	1
16	44	(Spain) David Salom	Yamaha YZF-R6	16	+46.152	22	
17	83	(Belgium) Didier van Keymeulen	Suzuki GSX-R600	16	+46.160	21	
18	32	(Italy) Mirko Giansanti	Honda CBR600RR	16	+46.192	28	
19	199	(Italy) Danilo dell'Omo	Honda CBR600RR	16	+46.264	24	
20	101	(United Kingdom) Kev Coghlan	Honda CBR600RR	16	+46.327	29	
21	47	(Italy) Ivan Clementi	Triumph 675	16	+46.509	31	
22	51	(Spain) Santiago Barragán	Honda CBR600RR	16	+57.599	30	
23	38	(France) Grégory Leblanc	Honda CBR600RR	16	+58.057	32	
24	37	(San Marino) William de Angelis	Honda CBR600RR	16	+58.415	26	
25	4	(Italy) Lorenzo Alfonsi	Honda CBR600RR	16	+1:11.614	25	
26	75	(Slovenia) Luka Nedog	Honda CBR600RR	16	+1:19.957	34	
27	15	(Hungary) Gergõ Talmácsi	Honda CBR600RR	16	+1:19.985	36	
Ret	17	(Portugal) Miguel Praia	Honda CBR600RR	13	Retirement	19	
Ret	77	(Netherlands) Barry Veneman	Suzuki GSX-R600	7	Accident	15	
Ret	105	(Italy) Gianluca Vizziello	Honda CBR600RR	7	Retirement	6	
Ret	9	(United Kingdom) Chris Walker	Kawasaki ZX-6R	4	Retirement	20	
Ret	116	(Italy) Simone Sanna	Honda CBR600RR	3	Retirement	33	
Ret	65	(United Kingdom) Jonathan Rea	Honda CBR600RR	2	Retirement	5	
Ret	24	(Australia) Garry McCoy	Triumph 675	2	Retirement	23	
Ret	72	(Hungary) Attila Magda	Honda CBR600RR	1	Accident	37	
Ret	28	(Italy) Ruggero Scambia	Triumph 675	0	Accident	35	
Ret	81	(United Kingdom) Graeme Gowland	Honda CBR600RR	0	Accident	27	

== Superstock 1000 race classification ==
Pos.	No.	Rider	Bike	Laps	Time/Retired	Grid	Points
1	19	(Belgium) Xavier Simeon	Suzuki GSX-R1000 K8	11	20:14.707	10	'25
2	96	(Czech Republic) Matěj Smrž	Honda CBR1000RR	11	+2.109	9	20
3	53	(Italy) Alessandro Polita	Ducati 1098R	11	+2.147	13	16
4	155	(Australia) Brendan Roberts	Ducati 1098R	11	+6.656	8	13
5	119	(Italy) Michele Magnoni	Yamaha YZF-R1	11	+10.849	4	11
6	111	(Italy) Fabrizio Perotti	Suzuki GSX-R1000 K8	11	+11.070	17	10
7	78	(France) Freddy Foray	Suzuki GSX-R1000 K8	11	+11.143	24	9
8	88	(France) Kenny Foray	Yamaha YZF-R1	11	+14.501	23	8
9	87	(Australia) Gareth Jones	Suzuki GSX-R1000 K8	11	+15.802	25	7
10	30	(Switzerland) Michaël Savary	Suzuki GSX-R1000 K8	11	+16.593	22	6
11	12	(Italy) Alessio Aldrovandi	Kawasaki ZX-10R	11	+19.172	21	5
12	8	(Italy) Andrea Antonelli	Honda CBR1000RR	11	+19.315	14	4
13	14	(Sweden) Filip Backlund	Suzuki GSX-R1000 K8	11	+28.267	31	3
14	41	(Switzerland) Gregory Junod	Yamaha YZF-R1	11	+28.874	29	2
15	996	(Italy) Jonathan Gallina	Kawasaki ZX-10R	11	+29.029	28	1
16	99	(Netherlands) Roy Ten Napel	Suzuki GSX-R1000 K8	11	+39.472	34	
17	90	(Czech Republic) Michal Drobný	Honda CBR1000RR	11	+41.145	32	
18	66	(Netherlands) Branko Srdanov	Yamaha YZF-R1	11	+43.629	38	
19	92	(Slovenia) Jure Stibilj	Honda CBR1000RR	11	+44.176	40	
20	58	(Italy) Robert Gianfardoni	Ducati 1098R	11	+44.609	39	
21	57	(Australia) Cameron Stronach	Kawasaki ZX-10R	11	+56.517	36	
22	117	(Italy) Denis Sacchetti	Ducati 1098R	11	+1:20.649	26	
Ret	17	(Italy) Cristiano Todaro	Suzuki GSX-R1000 K8	7	Accident	30	
Ret	33	(Estonia) Marko Rohtlaan	Honda CBR1000RR	6	Retirement	19	
Ret	7	(Austria) René Mähr	KTM 1190 RC8	2	Retirement	37	
Ret	5	(Netherlands) Danny De Boer	Suzuki GSX-R1000 K8	1	Accident	27	
Ret	18	(United Kingdom) Matt Bond	Suzuki GSX-R1000 K8	1	Accident	33	
Ret	51	(Italy) Michele Pirro	Yamaha YZF-R1	1	Retirement	2	
Ret	20	(France) Sylvain Barrier	Yamaha YZF-R1	1	Retirement	18	
Ret	24	(Slovenia) Marko Jerman	Honda CBR1000RR	0	Accident	35	
Ret	77	(United Kingdom) Barry Burrell	Honda CBR1000RR	0	Accident	20	
Ret	21	(France) Maxime Berger	Honda CBR1000RR	0	Accident	16	
Ret	89	(Italy) Domenico Colucci	Ducati 1098R	0	Accident	15	
Ret	45	(Italy) Luca Verdini	Yamaha YZF-R1	0	Accident	12	
Ret	15	(Italy) Matteo Baiocco	Kawasaki ZX-10R	0	Accident	11	
Ret	23	(Australia) Chris Seaton	Suzuki GSX-R1000 K8	0	Accident	7	
Ret	132	(France) Yoann Tiberio	Kawasaki ZX-10R	0	Accident	6	
Ret	16	(Netherlands) Raymond Schouten	Yamaha YZF-R1	0	Accident	5	
Ret	34	(Italy) Davide Giugliano	Suzuki GSX-R1000 K8	0	Accident	3	
Ret	71	(Italy) Claudio Corti	Yamaha YZF-R1	0	Accident	1	

== Superstock 600 race classification ==
The race was stopped after 3 laps after Nacho Calero crashed at the Ascari corner, the bike spilled oil across the corner and saw another 12 riders crash out. The race was restarted for 5 laps and the results were taken from aggregate time.

Pos.	No.	Rider	Bike	Laps	Time/Retired	Grid	Points
1	65	(France) Loris Baz	Yamaha YZF-R6	8	15:28.647	1	25
2	5	(Italy) Marco Bussolotti	Yamaha YZF-R6	8	+1.159	4	20
3	24	(Italy) Daniele Beretta	Suzuki GSX-R600	8	+1.364	7	16
4	119	(Italy) Danilo Petrucci	Yamaha YZF-R6	8	+1.435	2	13
5	42	(Italy) Leonardo Biliotti	Honda CBR600RR	8	+2.008	5	11
6	77	(Czech Republic) Patrik Vostárek	Honda CBR600RR	8	+3.140	10	10
7	47	(Italy) Eddi La Marra	Suzuki GSX-R600	8	+4.697	11	9
8	44	(United Kingdom) Gino Rea	Yamaha YZF-R6	8	+6.512	6	8
9	32	(Italy) Gianluca Capitini	Yamaha YZF-R6	8	+8.173	8	7
10	3	(Italy) Giuliano Gregorini	Honda CBR600RR	8	+8.301	13	6
11	88	(Spain) Yannick Guerra	Yamaha YZF-R6	8	+8.599	16	5
12	57	(Denmark) Kenny Tirsgaard	Suzuki GSX-R600	8	+29.739	27	4
13	12	(United Kingdom) Sam Lowes	Honda CBR600RR	8	+32.763	26	3
14	23	(Switzerland) Christian Von Gunten	Suzuki GSX-R600	8	+33.141	31	2
15	35	(Italy) Simone Grotzkyj	Honda CBR600RR	8	+35.342	32	1
16	99	(United Kingdom) Gregg Black	Yamaha YZF-R6	8	+37.556	3	
Ret	10	(Spain) Nacho Calero	Yamaha YZF-R6	3	Accident (First attempt)	12	
Ret	21	(United Kingdom) Alex Lowes	Kawasaki ZX-6R	3	Accident (First attempt)	14	
Ret	93	(France) Mathieu Lussiana	Yamaha YZF-R6	3	Accident (First attempt)	17	
Ret	191	(Italy) Nico Morelli	Yamaha YZF-R6	3	Accident (First attempt)	19	
Ret	11	(France) Jérémy Guarnoni	Yamaha YZF-R6	3	Accident (First attempt)	20	
Ret	72	(Norway) Fredrik Karlsen	Yamaha YZF-R6	3	Accident (First attempt)	22	
Ret	56	(United Kingdom) David Paton	Honda CBR600RR	3	Accident (First attempt)	24	
Ret	91	(Sweden) Hampus Johansson	Yamaha YZF-R6	3	Accident (First attempt)	21	
Ret	111	(Czech Republic) Michal Šembera	Honda CBR600RR	3	Accident (First attempt)	15	
Ret	96	(United Kingdom) Daniel Brill	Honda CBR600RR	3	Accident (First attempt)	30	
Ret	6	(Italy) Andrea Boscoscuro	Kawasaki ZX-6R	3	Accident (First attempt)	29	
Ret	17	(United Kingdom) Robbie Stewart	Triumph 675	3	Accident (First attempt)	23	
Ret	18	(France) Nicolas Pouhair	Yamaha YZF-R6	3	Accident (First attempt)	9	
Ret	14	(Belgium) Nicolas Pirot	Yamaha YZF-R6	2	Accident (First attempt)	28	
Ret	55	(Belgium) Vincent Lonbois	Suzuki GSX-R600	0	Accident (First attempt)	18	
DNS	45	(United Kingdom) Dan Linfoot	Yamaha YZF-R6	0	Did not start	25	
