= 2008 Donington Park Superbike World Championship round =

(United Kingdom) 2008 Donington Park Superbike World Championship round
Round details
- Round 11 of 14 rounds in the 2008 Superbike World Championship. and Round 10 of 13 rounds in the 2008 Supersport World Championship.
- Date: 7 September, 2008
- Location: Donington Park
- Course: Permanent racing facility 4.023 km (2.500 mi)

Superbike World Championship
Pole position
(Australia) Troy Bayliss
1:42.013
Fastest lap race 1	Fastest lap race 2
(Australia) Troy Bayliss	(United Kingdom) James Ellison
1:31.814	1:43.405

Supersport World Championship
Pole position
(France) Matthieu Lagrive
1:43.075
Fastest lap
(Australia) Josh Brookes
1:34.079

The 2008 Donington Park Superbike World Championship round was the eleventh round of the 2008 Superbike World Championship. It took place on the weekend of 5–7 September 2008, at the Donington Park circuit.

== Superbike race 1 classification ==
Pos	No	Rider	Bike	Laps	Time	Grid	Points
1	21	(Australia) Troy Bayliss	Ducati 1098 F08	19	29:55.384	1	25
2	66	(United Kingdom) Tom Sykes	Suzuki GSX-R1000	19	+1.266	7	20
3	3	(Italy) Max Biaggi	Ducati 1098 RS 08	19	+28.636	6	16
4	36	(Spain) Gregorio Lavilla	Honda CBR1000RR	19	+33.566	15	13
5	34	(Japan) Yukio Kagayama	Suzuki GSX-R1000	19	+35.966	24	11
6	96	(Czech Republic) Jakub Smrž	Ducati 1098 RS 08	19	+36.034	16	10
7	10	(Spain) Fonsi Nieto	Suzuki GSX-R1000	19	+36.442	23	9
8	91	(United Kingdom) Leon Haslam	Honda CBR1000RR	19	+41.633	12	8
9	31	(Australia) Karl Muggeridge	Honda CBR1000RR	19	+42.075	19	7
10	80	(United Kingdom) James Ellison	Honda CBR1000RR	19	+43.476	5	6
11	94	(Spain) David Checa	Yamaha YZF-R1	19	+1:12.578	17	5
12	86	(Italy) Ayrton Badovini	Kawasaki ZX-10R	19	+1:13.147	21	4
13	38	(Japan) Shinichi Nakatomi	Yamaha YZF-R1	19	+1:34.664	30	3
14	88	(Japan) Shuhei Aoyama	Honda CBR1000RR	19	+1:56.726	29	2
Ret	111	(Spain) Rubén Xaus	Ducati 1098 RS 08	19	+22.031	4	
Ret	13	(Italy) Vittorio Iannuzzo	Kawasaki ZX-10R	19	+1:27.258	28	
Ret	73	(Austria) Christian Zaiser	Yamaha YZF-R1	19	+2:45.407	31	
Ret	57	(Italy) Lorenzo Lanzi	Ducati 1098 RS 08	14	Retirement	18	
Ret	44	(Italy) Roberto Rolfo	Honda CBR1000RR	12	Accident	25	
Ret	84	(Italy) Michel Fabrizio	Ducati 1098 F08	10	Accident	10	
Ret	11	(Australia) Troy Corser	Yamaha YZF-R1	9	Accident	8	
Ret	100	(Japan) Makoto Tamada	Kawasaki ZX-10R	9	Accident	27	
Ret	41	(Japan) Noriyuki Haga	Yamaha YZF-R1	9	Retirement	11	
Ret	7	(Spain) Carlos Checa	Honda CBR1000RR	9	Accident	3	
Ret	194	(France) Sébastien Gimbert	Yamaha YZF-R1	6	Accident	22	
Ret	76	(Germany) Max Neukirchner	Suzuki GSX-R1000	5	Accident	14	
Ret	9	(United Kingdom) Chris Walker	Honda CBR1000RR	5	Retirement	13	
Ret	55	(France) Régis Laconi	Kawasaki ZX-10R	5	Retirement	26	
Ret	50	(United States) Matt Lynn	Honda CBR1000RR	3	Retirement	32	
Ret	22	(Italy) Luca Morelli	Honda CBR1000RR	3	Accident	33	
Ret	35	(United Kingdom) Cal Crutchlow	Honda CBR1000RR	2	Retirement	9	
Ret	23	(Japan) Ryuichi Kiyonari	Honda CBR1000RR	1	Accident	2	
Ret	54	(Turkey) Kenan Sofuoğlu	Honda CBR1000RR	1	Accident	20	

== Superbike race 2 classification ==
Pos	No	Rider	Bike	Laps	Time	Grid	Points
1	23	(Japan) Ryuichi Kiyonari	Honda CBR1000RR	23	40:26.508	2	25
2	35	(United Kingdom) Cal Crutchlow	Honda CBR1000RR	23	+2.261	9	20
3	11	(Australia) Troy Corser	Yamaha YZF-R1	23	+9.727	8	16
4	80	(United Kingdom) James Ellison	Honda CBR1000RR	23	+20.227	5	13
5	84	(Italy) Michel Fabrizio	Ducati 1098 F08	23	+27.475	10	11
6	3	(Italy) Max Biaggi	Ducati 1098 RS 08	23	+28.051	6	10
7	36	(Spain) Gregorio Lavilla	Honda CBR1000RR	23	+30.922	15	9
8	111	(Spain) Rubén Xaus	Ducati 1098 RS 08	23	+38.353	4	8
9	7	(Spain) Carlos Checa	Honda CBR1000RR	23	+50.196	3	7
10	66	(United Kingdom) Tom Sykes	Suzuki GSX-R1000	23	+57.346	7	6
11	57	(Italy) Lorenzo Lanzi	Ducati 1098 RS 08	23	+1:03.093	18	5
12	96	(Czech Republic) Jakub Smrž	Ducati 1098 RS 08	23	+1:06.697	16	4
13	44	(Italy) Roberto Rolfo	Honda CBR1000RR	23	+1:08.057	25	3
14	76	(Germany) Max Neukirchner	Suzuki GSX-R1000	23	+1:15.276	14	2
15	55	(France) Régis Laconi	Kawasaki ZX-10R	23	+1:38.848	26	1
16	100	(Japan) Makoto Tamada	Kawasaki ZX-10R	22	+1 Lap	27	
17	88	(Japan) Shuhei Aoyama	Honda CBR1000RR	22	+1 Lap	29	
18	38	(Japan) Shinichi Nakatomi	Yamaha YZF-R1	22	+1 Lap	30	
19	34	(Japan) Yukio Kagayama	Suzuki GSX-R1000	22	+1 Lap	24	
Ret	31	(Australia) Karl Muggeridge	Honda CBR1000RR	21	Accident	19	
Ret	91	(United Kingdom) Leon Haslam	Honda CBR1000RR	20	Accident	12	
Ret	94	(Spain) David Checa	Yamaha YZF-R1	18	Accident	17	
Ret	10	(Spain) Fonsi Nieto	Suzuki GSX-R1000	18	Retirement	23	
Ret	50	(United States) Matt Lynn	Honda CBR1000RR	18	Retirement	32	
Ret	9	(United Kingdom) Chris Walker	Honda CBR1000RR	16	Retirement	13	
Ret	21	(Australia) Troy Bayliss	Ducati 1098 F08	12	Retirement	1	
Ret	73	(Austria) Christian Zaiser	Yamaha YZF-R1	7	Retirement	31	
Ret	86	(Italy) Ayrton Badovini	Kawasaki ZX-10R	6	Retirement	21	
Ret	22	(Italy) Luca Morelli	Honda CBR1000RR	3	Retirement	33	
Ret	194	(France) Sébastien Gimbert	Yamaha YZF-R1	2	Retirement	22	
Ret	13	(Italy) Vittorio Iannuzzo	Kawasaki ZX-10R	2	Retirement	28	
DSQ	41	(Japan) Noriyuki Haga	Yamaha YZF-R1	9	Disqualified	11	
DNS	54	(Turkey) Kenan Sofuoglu	Honda CBR1000RR		Not Started	20	

== Supersport race classification ==
Pos	No	Rider	Bike	Laps	Time	Grid	Points
1	25	(Australia) Josh Brookes	Honda CBR600RR	22	34:53.607	4	25
2	88	(Australia) Andrew Pitt	Honda CBR600RR	22	+0.872	15	20
3	65	(United Kingdom) Jonathan Rea	Honda CBR600RR	22	+4.846	2	16
4	77	(Netherlands) Barry Veneman	Suzuki GSX-R600	22	+5.066	3	13
5	33	(South Africa) Hudson Kennaugh	Yamaha YZF-R6	22	+8.604	8	11
6	127	(Denmark) Robbin Harms	Honda CBR600RR	22	+8.990	12	10
7	26	(Spain) Joan Lascorz	Honda CBR600RR	22	+15.660	10	9
8	83	(Belgium) Didier van Keymeulen	Suzuki GSX-R600	22	+16.674	5	8
9	14	(France) Matthieu Lagrive	Honda CBR600RR	22	+17.081	1	7
10	23	(Australia) Broc Parkes	Yamaha YZF-R6	22	+20.474	20	6
11	105	(Italy) Gianluca Vizziello	Honda CBR600RR	22	+21.110	24	5
12	50	(Republic of Ireland) Eugene Laverty	Yamaha YZF-R6	22	+26.338	21	4
13	8	(Australia) Mark Aitchison	Triumph 675	22	+26.597	17	3
14	21	(Japan) Katsuaki Fujiwara	Kawasaki ZX-6R	22	+29.104	11	2
15	126	(United Kingdom) Chris Martin	Kawasaki ZX-6R	22	+30.603	14	1
16	69	(Italy) Gianluca Nannelli	Honda CBR600RR	22	+39.201	16	
17	55	(Italy) Massimo Roccoli	Yamaha YZF-R6	22	+39.505	26	
18	47	(Italy) Ivan Clementi	Triumph 675	22	+40.004	22	
19	199	(Italy) Danilo Dell'Omo	Honda CBR600RR	22	+41.030	9	
20	81	(United Kingdom) Graeme Gowland	Honda CBR600RR	22	+53.383	31	
21	34	(Hungary) Balázs Németh	Honda CBR600RR	22	+1:10.076	25	
22	67	(Australia) Bryan Staring	Honda CBR600RR	22	+1:19.610	30	
23	53	(New Zealand) Midge Smart	Honda CBR600RR	22	+1:19.931	28	
24	51	(Spain) Santiago Barragán	Honda CBR600RR	21	+1 Lap	33	
Ret	4	(Italy) Lorenzo Alfonsi	Honda CBR600RR	19	Accident	23	
Ret	117	(Italy) Denis Sacchetti	Honda CBR600RR	14	Accident	29	
Ret	44	(Spain) David Salom	Yamaha YZF-R6	12	Accident	32	
Ret	19	(Poland) Paweł Szkopek	Triumph 675	10	Accident	13	
Ret	30	(Germany) Jesco Günther	Honda CBR600RR	2	Accident	18	
Ret	31	(Finland) Vesa Kallio	Honda CBR600RR	1	Accident	7	
Ret	11	(Australia) Russell Holland	Honda CBR600RR	1	Accident	6	
Ret	27	(United Kingdom) Rob Frost	Triumph 675	0	Accident	19	
Ret	17	(Portugal) Miguel Praia	Honda CBR600RR	0	Accident	27	

== Superstock 1000 race classification ==
Pos	No	Rider	Bike	Laps	Time	Grid	Points
1	19	(Belgium) Xavier Simeon	Suzuki GSX-R1000 K8	12	21:30.092	1	25
2	53	(Italy) Alessandro Polita	Ducati 1098R	12	+16.109	4	20
3	34	(Italy) Davide Giugliano	Suzuki GSX-R1000 K8	12	+34.318	7	16
4	155	(Australia) Brendan Roberts	Ducati 1098R	12	+37.319	5	13
5	10	(United Kingdom) Jon Kirkham	Yamaha YZF-R1	12	+44.199	3	11
6	21	(France) Maxime Berger	Honda CBR1000RR	12	+45.533	8	10
7	15	(Italy) Matteo Baiocco	Kawasaki ZX-10R	12	+47.888	13	9
8	14	(Sweden) Filip Backlund	Suzuki GSX-R1000 K8	12	+49.623	16	8
9	77	(United Kingdom) Barry Burrell	Honda CBR1000RR	12	+50.461	15	7
10	92	(Slovenia) Jure Stibilj	Honda CBR1000RR	12	+51.416	24	6
11	89	(Italy) Domenico Colucci	Ducati 1098R	12	+52.516	17	5
12	16	(Netherlands) Raymond Schouten	Yamaha YZF-R1	12	+1:01.720	23	4
13	5	(Netherlands) Danny De Boer	Suzuki GSX-R1000 K8	12	+1:02.726	25	3
14	107	(Italy) Niccolò Rosso	Honda CBR1000RR	12	+1:02.946	35	2
15	41	(Switzerland) Gregory Junod	Yamaha YZF-R1	12	+1:05.181	37	1
16	60	(United Kingdom) Peter Hickman	Yamaha YZF-R1	12	+1:07.026	21	
17	82	(France) Franck Millet	Yamaha YZF-R1	12	+1:10.043	32	
18	154	(Italy) Tommaso Lorenzetti	Suzuki GSX-R1000 K8	12	+1:10.558	14	
19	51	(Italy) Michele Pirro	Yamaha YZF-R1	12	+1:10.929	6	
20	132	(France) Yoann Tiberio	Kawasaki ZX-10R	12	+1:12.577	27	
21	12	(Italy) Alessio Aldrovandi	Kawasaki ZX-10R	12	+1:13.377	26	
22	24	(Slovenia) Marko Jerman	Honda CBR1000RR	12	+1:18.026	33	
23	99	(Netherlands) Roy Ten Napel	Suzuki GSX-R1000 K8	12	+1:18.515	28	
24	57	(Australia) Cameron Stronach	Kawasaki ZX-10R	12	+1:46.326	36	
25	58	(Italy) Robert Gianfardoni	Ducati 1098R	11	+1 lap	34	
26	78	(France) Freddy Foray	Suzuki GSX-R1000 K8	11	+1 lap	39	
Ret	7	(Austria) René Mähr	KTM 1190 RC8	10	Retirement	20	
Ret	88	(France) Kenny Foray	Yamaha YZF-R1	7	Retirement	22	
Ret	66	(Netherlands) Branko Srdanov	Yamaha YZF-R1	6	Retirement	31	
Ret	81	(Finland) Pauli Pekkanen	KTM 1190 RC8	5	Retirement	11	
Ret	113	(South Africa) Sheridan Morais	Kawasaki ZX-10R	4	Retirement	18	
Ret	30	(Switzerland) Michaël Savary	Suzuki GSX-R1000 K8	4	Retirement	29	
Ret	90	(Czech Republic) Michal Drobný	Honda CBR1000RR	2	Retirement	30	
Ret	87	(Australia) Gareth Jones	Suzuki GSX-R1000 K8	1	Accident	19	
Ret	96	(Czech Republic) Matěj Smrž	Honda CBR1000RR	0	Accident	12	
Ret	71	(Italy) Claudio Corti	Yamaha YZF-R1	0	Accident	10	
Ret	23	(Australia) Chris Seaton	Suzuki GSX-R1000 K8	0	Accident	2	
Ret	8	(Italy) Andrea Antonelli	Honda CBR1000RR	0	Accident	38	
Ret	119	(Italy) Michele Magnoni	Yamaha YZF-R1	0	Accident	9	
DNQ	18	(United Kingdom) Matt Bond	Suzuki GSX-R1000 K8		Did not qualify		
OFFICIAL SUPERSTOCK 1000 RACE REPORT

== Superstock 600 race classification ==
Pos	No	Rider	Bike	Laps	Time	Grid	Points
1	5	(Italy) Marco Bussolotti	Yamaha YZF-R6	10	18:11.205	1	25
2	21	(United Kingdom) Alex Lowes	Kawasaki ZX-6R	10	+5.559	2	20
3	44	(United Kingdom) Gino Rea	Yamaha YZF-R6	10	+11.227	5	16
4	45	(United Kingdom) Dan Linfoot	Yamaha YZF-R6	10	+11.298	4	13
5	77	(Czech Republic) Patrik Vostárek	Honda CBR600RR	10	+29.434	12	11
6	12	(United Kingdom) Sam Lowes	Honda CBR600RR	10	+30.765	16	10
7	55	(Belgium) Vincent Lonbois	Suzuki GSX-R600	10	+32.599	15	9
8	13	(United Kingdom) Lee Johnston	Honda CBR600RR	10	+37.778	8	8
9	42	(Italy) Leonardo Biliotti	Honda CBR600RR	10	+38.491	19	7
10	47	(Italy) Eddi La Marra	Suzuki GSX-R600	10	+43.184	17	6
11	53	(United Kingdom) Joe Burns	Yamaha YZF-R6	10	+48.676	6	5
12	65	(France) Loris Baz	Yamaha YZF-R6	10	+49.669	20	4
13	23	(Switzerland) Christian Von Gunten	Suzuki GSX-R600	10	+51.636	21	3
14	64	(United States) Josh Day	Honda CBR600RR	10	+52.503	28	2
15	3	(Italy) Giuliano Gregorini	Honda CBR600RR	10	+53.156	18	1
16	17	(United Kingdom) Robbie Stewart	Triumph 675	10	+53.392	22	
17	111	(Czech Republic) Michal Šembera	Honda CBR600RR	10	+53.748	27	
18	88	(Spain) Yannick Guerra	Yamaha YZF-R6	10	+1:04.354	29	
19	11	(France) Jérémy Guarnoni	Yamaha YZF-R6	10	+1:07.092	25	
20	57	(Denmark) Kenny Tirsgaard	Suzuki GSX-R600	10	+1:13.718	26	
21	19	(Netherlands) Nigel Walraven	Suzuki GSX-R600	10	+1:17.296	24	
22	10	(Spain) Nacho Calero	Yamaha YZF-R6	10	+1:18.689	31	
Ret	16	(United Kingdom) Leon Hunt	Yamaha YZF-R6	8	Retirement	9	
Ret	72	(Norway) Fredrik Karlsen	Yamaha YZF-R6	5	Retirement	30	
Ret	93	(France) Mathieu Lussiana	Yamaha YZF-R6	2	Accident	13	
Ret	14	(Belgium) Nicolas Pirot	Yamaha YZF-R6	2	Accident	23	
Ret	36	(Italy) Davide Fanelli	Triumph 675	1	Accident	3	
Ret	99	(United Kingdom) Gregg Black	Yamaha YZF-R6	1	Retirement	10	
Ret	18	(France) Nicolas Pouhair	Yamaha YZF-R6	1	Retirement	7	
Ret	91	(Sweden) Hampus Johansson	Yamaha YZF-R6	0	Accident	14	
Ret	24	(Italy) Daniele Beretta	Suzuki GSX-R600	0	Accident	11	
DNS	119	(Italy) Danilo Petrucci	Yamaha YZF-R6		Did not start		
WD	35	(Italy) Simone Grotzkyj	Honda CBR600RR		Withdrew		

== Notes ==
- Race 1 in Superbike was stopped after 9 laps, for danger caused by oil on the already slippery track. It was later restarted, but it was stopped again after 10 laps for rain. The total laps completed were 19 and thus full points were awarded.
- The result of race 1 is determined by the aggregate of the two heats. Riders who had an accident or retired in the laps in which the red flag was exposed were not classified.
