= Russell Holland =

Australian motorcycle racer (born 1983)

- Nationality: Australian
- Born: 9 December 1983 (age 42); Sydney (Australia)

Russell Holland is a Grand Prix motorcycle racer from Hornsby, Australia. Early in his career, he raced for Teknic Honda, and in 2013, he joined the Inglis Honda Racing team.

In 2009, while racing with the Demolition Plus team (along with Craig Coxhell and Gareth Jones), Holland won The Bel-Ray 6 Hour at Oran Park, the last year the event was held at the site before the Park was demolished.

== Career statistics ==
=== By season ===
Season	Class	Motorcycle	Race	Win	Podium	Pole	FLap	Pts	Plcd
2002	250cc	Yamaha	1	0	0	0	0	0	NC
Total			1	0	0	0	0	0	
