= 2007 Donington Park Superbike World Championship round =

(Europe) 2007 European Superbike World Championship round
Round details
- Round 3 of 13 rounds in the 2007 Superbike World Championship. and Round 3 of 13 rounds in the 2007 Supersport World Championship.
- Date: 1 April, 2007
- Location: Donington Park
- Course: Permanent racing facility 4.023 km (2.500 mi)

Superbike World Championship
Pole position
(Australia) Troy Bayliss
1:32.333
Fastest lap race 1	Fastest lap race 2
(Australia) Troy Bayliss	(Japan) Noriyuki Haga
1:31.575	1:31.634

Supersport World Championship
Pole position
(Spain) Pere Riba
1:34.066
Fastest lap
(Japan) Katsuaki Fujiwara
1:33.848

The 2007 Donington Park Superbike World Championship round was the third round of the 2007 Superbike World Championship. It took place on the weekend of 30 March–1 April 2007. The round at Donington marked World Superbike's 20th anniversary with the first ever meeting being held at the Derbyshire circuit on 3 April 1988. For the 2007 season, World Superbike returned to Donington Park for the first time since 2001.

== Overview ==
In celebration of the 20th anniversary a parade lap of former Superbike stars and champions was organised featuring Fred Merkel, Aaron Slight, Scott Russell, Piergiorgio Bontempi, Peter Goddard, Marco Lucchinelli, Davide Tardozzi, Fabrizio Pirovano, Roger Burnett, James Whitham, Pierfrancesco Chili, Neil Hodgson and John Reynolds.

On lap six of the first World Superbike race of the day, Troy Bayliss crashed at Coppice corner. His right hand was momentarily caught between the handle bar and the frame of the motorcycle during the crash; the resulting injury required the surgical removal of the intermediate and distal phalanges of his little finger. In the same incident he also suffered an injury to the groin described by the rider as a split atom.

== Superbike race 1 classification ==
Pos	No	Rider	Bike	Laps	Time	Grid	Points
1	52	(United Kingdom) James Toseland	Honda CBR1000RR	23	35:28.222	4	25
2	11	(Australia) Troy Corser	Yamaha YZF-R1	23	+1.368	8	20
3	3	(Italy) Max Biaggi	Suzuki GSX-R1000 K7	23	+2.448	7	16
4	41	(Japan) Noriyuki Haga	Yamaha YZF-R1	23	+9.249	2	13
5	57	(Italy) Lorenzo Lanzi	Ducati 999 F07	23	+18.028	5	11
6	10	(Spain) Fonsi Nieto	Kawasaki ZX-10R	23	+18.956	10	10
7	55	(France) Régis Laconi	Kawasaki ZX-10R	23	+29.998	3	9
8	76	(Germany) Max Neukirchner	Suzuki GSX-R1000 K6	23	+30.296	11	8
9	44	(Italy) Roberto Rolfo	Honda CBR1000RR	23	+30.525	16	7
10	96	(Czech Republic) Jakub Smrž	Ducati 999 F05	23	+36.661	17	6
11	31	(Australia) Karl Muggeridge	Honda CBR1000RR	23	+39.389	9	5
12	25	(Australia) Josh Brookes	Honda CBR1000RR	23	+48.045	15	4
13	84	(Italy) Michel Fabrizio	Honda CBR1000RR	23	+51.290	13	3
14	159	(Italy) Giovanni Bussei	Ducati 999 F06	23	+51.402	12	2
15	42	(United Kingdom) Dean Ellison	Ducati 999RS	23	+1:00.156	20	1
16	22	(Italy) Luca Morelli	Ducati 999RS	22	+1 Lap	22	
17	38	(Japan) Shinichi Nakatomi	Yamaha YZF-R1	22	+1 Lap	21	
18	64	(United Kingdom) Aaron Zanotti	Yamaha YZF-R1	22	+1 Lap	19	
19	99	(Australia) Steve Martin	Honda CBR1000RR	18	+5 Laps	14	
Ret	111	(Spain) Rubén Xaus	Ducati 999 F06	21	Retirement	6	
Ret	73	(Austria) Christian Zaiser	MV Agusta F4 312 R	11	Retirement	23	
Ret	53	(Italy) Alex Polita	Suzuki GSX-R1000 K6	10	Retirement	18	
Ret	21	(Australia) Troy Bayliss	Ducati 999 F07	5	Retirement	1	

== Superbike race 2 classification ==
Pos	No	Rider	Bike	Laps	Time	Grid	Points
1	41	(Japan) Noriyuki Haga	Yamaha YZF-R1	23	35:26.734	2	25
2	3	(Italy) Max Biaggi	Suzuki GSX-R1000 K7	23	+0.111	7	20
3	11	(Australia) Troy Corser	Yamaha YZF-R1	23	+1.100	8	16
4	111	(Spain) Rubén Xaus	Ducati 999 F06	23	+5.927	6	13
5	57	(Italy) Lorenzo Lanzi	Ducati 999 F07	23	+9.834	5	11
6	55	(France) Régis Laconi	Kawasaki ZX-10R	23	+12.203	3	10
7	44	(Italy) Roberto Rolfo	Honda CBR1000RR	23	+22.287	16	9
8	96	(Czech Republic) Jakub Smrž	Ducati 999 F05	23	+30.060	17	8
9	31	(Australia) Karl Muggeridge	Honda CBR1000RR	23	+37.734	9	7
10	76	(Germany) Max Neukirchner	Suzuki GSX-R1000 K6	23	+39.893	11	6
11	159	(Italy) Giovanni Bussei	Ducati 999 F06	23	+41.524	12	5
12	84	(Italy) Michel Fabrizio	Honda CBR1000RR	23	+45.617	13	4
13	99	(Australia) Steve Martin	Honda CBR1000RR	23	+52.547	14	3
14	38	(Japan) Shinichi Nakatomi	Yamaha YZF-R1	23	+1:01.669	21	2
15	25	(Australia) Josh Brookes	Honda CBR1000RR	23	+1:20.586	15	1
16	64	(United Kingdom) Aaron Zanotti	Yamaha YZF-R1	23	+1:26.912	19	
17	22	(Italy) Luca Morelli	Ducati 999RS	23	+1:27.181	22	
Ret	10	(Spain) Fonsi Nieto	Kawasaki ZX-10R	11	Retirement	10	
Ret	42	(United Kingdom) Dean Ellison	Ducati 999RS	7	Retirement	20	
Ret	52	(United Kingdom) James Toseland	Honda CBR1000RR	3	Retirement	4	
Ret	73	(Austria) Christian Zaiser	MV Agusta F4 312 R	0	Retirement	23	

== Supersport classification ==
=== Aggregate ===
Pos.	No.	Rider	Bike	Laps	Time/Retired	Grid	Points
1	54	(Turkey) Kenan Sofuoğlu	Honda CBR600RR	22	34:56.601	3	25
2	127	(Denmark) Robbin Harms	Honda CBR600RR	22	+0.764	11	20
3	21	(Japan) Katsuaki Fujiwara	Honda CBR600RR	22	+1.343	8	16
4	18	(United Kingdom) Craig Jones	Honda CBR600RR	22	+10.215	19	13
5	116	(Italy) Simone Sanna	Honda CBR600RR	22	+12.135	2	11
6	34	(Italy) Davide Giugliano	Kawasaki ZX-6R	22	+12.982	14	10
7	32	(France) Yoann Tiberio	Honda CBR600RR	22	+16.642	5	9
8	55	(Italy) Massimo Roccoli	Yamaha YZF-R6	22	+16.664	20	8
9	94	(Spain) David Checa	Yamaha YZF-R6	22	+22.965	9	7
10	69	(Italy) Gianluca Nannelli	Ducati 749R	22	+23.852	12	6
11	194	(France) Sébastien Gimbert	Yamaha YZF-R6	22	+24.862	10	5
12	45	(Italy) Gianluca Vizziello	Yamaha YZF-R6	22	+26.053	15	4
13	44	(Spain) David Salom	Yamaha YZF-R6	22	+26.512	17	3
14	77	(Netherlands) Barry Veneman	Suzuki GSX-R600	22	+29.445	4	2
15	7	(Spain) Pere Riba	Kawasaki ZX-6R	22	+29.448	1	1
16	8	(Canada) Chris Peris	Yamaha YZF-R6	22	+43.818	25	
17	12	(Spain) Javier Forés	Honda CBR600RR	22	+44.841	18	
18	35	(Italy) Gilles Boccolini	Kawasaki ZX-6R	22	+50.106	21	
19	60	(Russia) Vladimir Ivanov	Yamaha YZF-R6	22	+51.700	22	
20	17	(Portugal) Miguel Praia	Honda CBR600RR	22	+1:08.398	31	
21	46	(Germany) Jesco Günther	Honda CBR600RR	22	+1:24.701	30	
22	39	(Spain) David Forner	Yamaha YZF-R6	20	+2 laps	34	
Ret	38	(France) Grégory Leblanc	Honda CBR600RR	14	Retirement	27	
Ret	4	(Italy) Lorenzo Alfonsi	Honda CBR600RR	11	Retirement	6	
Ret	26	(Spain) Joan Lascorz	Honda CBR600RR	11	Retirement	16	
Ret	88	(Hungary) Gergő Talmácsi	Yamaha YZF-R6	11	Retirement	23	
Ret	96	(Sweden) Nikola Milovanovic	Honda CBR600RR	11	Retirement	33	
Ret	121	(France) Arnaud Vincent	Yamaha YZF-R6	10	Retirement	28	
Ret	81	(France) Matthieu Lagrive	Honda CBR600RR	9	Retirement	13	
Ret	25	(Finland) Tatu Lauslehto	Honda CBR600RR	8	Retirement	29	
Ret	31	(Finland) Vesa Kallio	Suzuki GSX-R600	8	Retirement	24	
Ret	9	(France) Fabien Foret	Kawasaki ZX-6R	7	Retirement	7	
Ret	73	(Austria) Yves Polzer	Ducati 749R	5	Retirement	32	
DNS	5	(Italy) Alessio Velini	Yamaha YZF-R6	0	Did not start	26	

== Superstock classification ==
=== STK1000 race classification ===
Pos.	No.	Rider	Bike	Laps	Time/Retired	Grid	Points
1	59	(Italy) Niccolò Canepa	Ducati 1098S	8	12:46.272	2	25
2	71	(Italy) Claudio Corti	Yamaha YZF-R1	8	+0.147	5	20
3	83	(Belgium) Didier Van Keymeulen	Yamaha YZF-R1	8	+0.983	3	16
4	3	(Australia) Mark Aitchison	Suzuki GSX-R1000 K6	8	+2.355	7	13
5	15	(Italy) Matteo Baiocco	Yamaha YZF-R1	8	+4.199	13	11
6	57	(Italy) Ilario Dionisi	Suzuki GSX-R1000 K6	8	+6.635	11	10
7	19	(Belgium) Xavier Simeon	Suzuki GSX-R1000 K6	8	+6.927	19	9
8	49	(Germany) Arne Tode	Honda CBR1000RR	8	+9.402	15	8
9	32	(South Africa) Sheridan Morais	Ducati 1098S	8	+10.150	8	7
10	44	(Austria) René Mähr	Yamaha YZF-R1	8	+10.846	16	6
11	24	(Slovenia) Marko Jerman	Yamaha YZF-R1	8	+11.145	22	5
12	25	(Italy) Dario Giuseppetti	Yamaha YZF-R1	8	+11.578	10	4
13	33	(Estonia) Marko Rohtlaan	Honda CBR1000RR	8	+11.922	12	3
14	23	(France) Cédric Tangre	Yamaha YZF-R1	8	+16.027	20	2
15	28	(United States) Nicky Moore	Ducati 1098S	8	+18.843	30	1
16	77	(United Kingdom) Barry Burrell	Honda CBR1000RR	8	+19.008	29	
17	4	(France) Loïc Napoleone	MV Agusta F4 312 R	8	+19.738	17	
18	16	(Netherlands) Raymond Schouten	Yamaha YZF-R1	8	+22.783	25	
19	96	(Czech Republic) Matěj Smrž	Honda CBR1000RR	8	+23.181	28	
20	10	(France) Franck Millet	MV Agusta F4 312 R	8	+23.562	27	
21	14	(Italy) Lorenzo Baroni	Ducati 1098S	8	+24.506	18	
22	73	(United Kingdom) Jonathan Howarth	Suzuki GSX-R1000 K6	8	+29.153	34	
23	13	(Hungary) Victor Kispataki	Suzuki GSX-R1000 K6	8	+29.749	33	
24	21	(Belgium) Wim Van Den Broeck	Yamaha YZF-R1	8	+31.543	35	
25	37	(Italy) Raffaele Filice	Suzuki GSX-R1000 K6	8	+41.766	31	
26	29	(Italy) Niccolò Rosso	Ducati 1098S	8	+44.739	38	
27	55	(Belgium) Olivier Depoorter	Yamaha YZF-R1	8	+45.344	24	
28	18	(United Kingdom) Matt Bond	Suzuki GSX-R1000 K6	8	+46.823	36	
29	58	(Italy) Robert Gianfardoni	Yamaha YZF-R1	8	+57.816	39	
30	51	(Italy) Michele Pirro	Yamaha YZF-R1	8	+1:24.092	1	
31	99	(Italy) Danilo Dell'Omo	MV Agusta F4 312 R	7	+1 lap	6	
Ret	11	(Italy) Denis Sacchetti	MV Agusta F4 312 R	7	Retirement	9	
Ret	86	(Italy) Ayrton Badovini	MV Agusta F4 312 R	6	Accident	4	
Ret	34	(Hungary) Balázs Németh	Suzuki GSX-R1000 K6	3	Accident	26	
Ret	5	(Netherlands) Bram Appelo	Honda CBR1000RR	1	Accident	37	
DNS	72	(United Kingdom) Adam Jenkinson	Suzuki GSX-R1000 K6		Did not start	14	
DNS	88	(Germany) Timo Gieseler	Yamaha YZF-R1		Did not start	21	
DNS	42	(Germany) Leonardo Biliotti	MV Agusta F4 312 R		Did not start	23	
DNS	75	(Slovenia) Luka Nedog	Ducati 1098S		Did not start	32	

=== STK600 race classification ===
Pos.	No.	Rider	Bike	Laps	Time/Retired	Grid	Points
1	119	(Italy) Michele Magnoni	Yamaha YZF-R6	10	16:16.888	1	25
2	8	(Italy) Andrea Antonelli	Honda CBR600RR	10	+0.528	5	20
3	89	(Italy) Domenico Colucci	Ducati 749R	10	+0.858	6	16
4	20	(France) Sylvain Barrier	Yamaha YZF-R6	10	+5.043	2	13
5	21	(France) Maxime Berger	Yamaha YZF-R6	10	+5.813	3	11
6	99	(Netherlands) Roy Ten Napel	Yamaha YZF-R6	10	+13.795	9	10
7	4	(France) Mathieu Gines	Yamaha YZF-R6	10	+10.052	7	9
8	30	(Switzerland) Michaël Savary	Yamaha YZF-R6	10	+17.746	11	8
9	7	(Italy) Renato Costantini	Honda CBR600RR	10	+19.978	10	7
10	44	(United Kingdom) Gino Rea	Suzuki GSX-R600	10	+23.865	12	6
11	199	(United Kingdom) Gregg Black	Yamaha YZF-R6	10	+23.978	4	5
12	75	(Germany) Dennis Sigloch	Yamaha YZF-R6	10	+24.109	13	4
13	31	(Italy) Giuseppe Barone	Honda CBR600RR	10	+27.954	8	3
14	41	(Switzerland) Gregory Junod	Kawasaki ZX-6R	10	+29.050	15	2
15	24	(Italy) Daniele Beretta	Suzuki GSX-R600	10	+29.574	17	1
16	81	(Czech Republic) Patrik Vostárek	Honda CBR600RR	10	+29.630	20	
17	43	(Italy) Daniele Rossi	Honda CBR600RR	10	+30.086	16	
18	111	(Czech Republic) Michal Šembera	Honda CBR600RR	10	+31.127	14	
19	57	(Denmark) Kenny Tirsgaard	Suzuki GSX-R600	10	+32.080	18	
20	22	(Italy) Gabriele Poma	Yamaha YZF-R6	10	+44.716	19	
21	11	(Italy) Ashley Carlucci	Kawasaki ZX-6R	10	+45.216	26	
22	55	(Belgium) Vincent Lonbois	Suzuki GSX-R600	10	+46.910	21	
23	28	(Spain) Yannick Guerra	Yamaha YZF-R6	10	+51.925	28	
24	112	(Spain) Josep Pedró	Yamaha YZF-R6	10	+52.836	23	
25	10	(United Kingdom) Leon Hunt	Honda CBR600RR	10	+53.448	24	
26	66	(Netherlands) Branko Srdanov	Yamaha YZF-R6	10	+1:10.731	25	
27	48	(Russia) Vladimir Leonov	Yamaha YZF-R6	10	+12.118	27	
28	35	(Bulgaria) Radostin Todorov	Yamaha YZF-R6	10	+1:33.980	31	
Ret	114	(Belgium) Nicolas Pirot	Yamaha YZF-R6	9	Accident	30	
Ret	25	(Australia) Ryan Taylor	Kawasaki ZX-6R	8	Accident	29	
Ret	47	(Italy) Eddi La Marra	Honda CBR600RR	0	Accident	22	
DNS	69	(Czech Republic) Ondřej Ježek	Kawasaki ZX-6R		Did not start		
WD	18	(United Kingdom) Daniel Brill	Suzuki GSX-R600		Withdrew		
WD	51	(United Kingdom) Jay Dunn	Suzuki GSX-R600		Withdrew		
