= 2007 Brands Hatch Superbike World Championship round =

(United Kingdom) 2007 Brands Hatch Superbike World Championship round
Round details
- Round 10 of 13 rounds in the 2007 Superbike World Championship. and Round 10 of 13 rounds in the 2007 Supersport World Championship.
- Date: 5 August, 2007
- Location: Brands Hatch
- Course: Permanent racing facility 3.702 km (2.300 mi)

Superbike World Championship
Pole position
(Australia) Troy Bayliss
1:25.607
Fastest lap race 1	Fastest lap race 2
(Japan) Noriyuki Haga	(United Kingdom) James Toseland
1:26.590	1:26.689

Supersport World Championship
Pole position
(France) Sébastien Charpentier
1:28.381
Fastest lap
(Australia) Broc Parkes
1:29.021

The 2007 Brands Hatch Superbike World Championship round was the tenth round of the 2007 Superbike World Championship. It took place on the weekend of 3–5 August 2007, at Brands Hatch.

== Superbike race 1 classification ==
Pos	No	Rider	Bike	Laps	Time	Grid	Points
1	52	(United Kingdom) James Toseland	Honda CBR1000RR	25	36:35.120	2	25
2	11	(Australia) Troy Corser	Yamaha YZF-R1	25	+1.554	5	20
3	3	(Italy) Max Biaggi	Suzuki GSX-R1000 K7	25	+2.917	6	16
4	111	(Spain) Rubén Xaus	Ducati 999 F06	25	+10.202	7	13
5	84	(Italy) Michel Fabrizio	Honda CBR1000RR	25	+14.133	10	11
6	44	(Italy) Roberto Rolfo	Honda CBR1000RR	25	+14.323	9	10
7	41	(Japan) Noriyuki Haga	Yamaha YZF-R1	25	+19.380	3	9
8	55	(France) Régis Laconi	Kawasaki ZX-10R	25	+22.676	12	8
9	57	(Italy) Lorenzo Lanzi	Ducati 999 F07	25	+24.259	8	7
10	76	(Germany) Max Neukirchner	Suzuki GSX-R1000 K6	25	+24.423	14	6
11	99	(Australia) Steve Martin	Yamaha YZF-R1	25	+33.365	11	5
12	10	(Spain) Fonsi Nieto	Kawasaki ZX-10R	25	+33.373	15	4
13	38	(Japan) Shinichi Nakatomi	Yamaha YZF-R1	25	+33.548	16	3
14	96	(Czech Republic) Jakub Smrž	Ducati 999 F05	25	+48.283	17	2
15	77	(United Kingdom) Marty Nutt	Yamaha YZF-R1	25	+1:04.655	18	1
16	112	(Italy) Stefano Cruciani	Suzuki GSX-R1000 K6	25	+1:08.886	21	
17	22	(Italy) Luca Morelli	Honda CBR1000RR	25	+1:08.953	20	
18	42	(United Kingdom) Dean Ellison	Ducati 999RS	25	+1:09.057	19	
Ret	31	(Australia) Karl Muggeridge	Honda CBR1000RR	23	Retirement	13	
Ret	71	(Japan) Yukio Kagayama	Suzuki GSX-R1000 K7	21	Retirement	4	
Ret	21	(Australia) Troy Bayliss	Ducati 999 F07	4	Retirement	1	

== Superbike race 2 classification ==
Pos	No	Rider	Bike	Laps	Time	Grid	Points
1	52	(United Kingdom) James Toseland	Honda CBR1000RR	25	36:34.177	2	25
2	41	(Japan) Noriyuki Haga	Yamaha YZF-R1	25	+1.686	3	20
3	11	(Australia) Troy Corser	Yamaha YZF-R1	25	+1.760	5	16
4	84	(Italy) Michel Fabrizio	Honda CBR1000RR	25	+8.456	10	13
5	71	(Japan) Yukio Kagayama	Suzuki GSX-R1000 K7	25	+8.988	4	11
6	111	(Spain) Rubén Xaus	Ducati 999 F06	25	+9.470	7	10
7	21	(Australia) Troy Bayliss	Ducati 999 F07	25	+18.313	1	9
8	3	(Italy) Max Biaggi	Suzuki GSX-R1000 K7	25	+19.116	6	8
9	55	(France) Régis Laconi	Kawasaki ZX-10R	25	+20.501	12	7
10	76	(Germany) Max Neukirchner	Suzuki GSX-R1000 K6	25	+20.586	14	6
11	44	(Italy) Roberto Rolfo	Honda CBR1000RR	25	+21.808	9	5
12	57	(Italy) Lorenzo Lanzi	Ducati 999 F07	25	+24.883	8	4
13	10	(Spain) Fonsi Nieto	Kawasaki ZX-10R	25	+31.988	15	3
14	31	(Australia) Karl Muggeridge	Honda CBR1000RR	25	+33.253	13	2
15	38	(Japan) Shinichi Nakatomi	Yamaha YZF-R1	25	+36.868	16	1
16	99	(Australia) Steve Martin	Yamaha YZF-R1	25	+37.972	11	
17	42	(United Kingdom) Dean Ellison	Ducati 999RS	25	+1:07.216	18	
18	22	(Italy) Luca Morelli	Honda CBR1000RR	25	+1:08.297	19	
Ret	96	(Czech Republic) Jakub Smrž	Ducati 999 F05	5	Retirement	17	
Ret	112	(Italy) Stefano Cruciani	Suzuki GSX-R1000 K6	0	Retirement	20	

== Supersport race classification ==
Pos	No	Rider	Bike	Laps	Time	Grid	Points
1	23	(Australia) Broc Parkes	Yamaha YZF-R6	23	34:34.688	4	25
2	54	(Turkey) Kenan Sofuoğlu	Honda CBR600RR	23	+3.658	2	20
3	55	(Italy) Massimo Roccoli	Yamaha YZF-R6	23	+5.556	7	16
4	127	(Denmark) Robbin Harms	Honda CBR600RR	23	+5.573	5	13
5	6	(United Kingdom) Tommy Hill	Yamaha YZF-R6	23	+6.506	6	11
6	9	(France) Fabien Foret	Kawasaki ZX-6R	23	+10.113	12	10
7	4	(Italy) Lorenzo Alfonsi	Honda CBR600RR	23	+10.414	10	9
8	77	(Netherlands) Barry Veneman	Suzuki GSX-R600	23	+14.236	9	8
9	7	(Spain) Pere Riba	Kawasaki ZX-6R	23	+15.978	11	7
10	81	(France) Matthieu Lagrive	Honda CBR600RR	23	+18.424	19	6
11	45	(Italy) Gianluca Vizziello	Yamaha YZF-R6	23	+25.083	13	5
12	26	(Spain) Joan Lascorz	Honda CBR600RR	23	+25.154	22	4
13	194	(France) Sébastien Gimbert	Yamaha YZF-R6	23	+25.442	18	3
14	38	(France) Grégory Leblanc	Honda CBR600RR	23	+28.957	14	2
15	71	(Italy) Mauro Sanchini	Honda CBR600RR	23	+36.557	24	1
16	12	(Spain) Javier Forés	Honda CBR600RR	23	+37.347	26	
17	94	(Spain) David Checa	Yamaha YZF-R6	23	+38.696	21	
18	35	(Italy) Giles Boccolini	Kawasaki ZX-6R	23	+38.770	25	
19	181	(United Kingdom) Graeme Gowland	Honda CBR600RR	23	+38.953	28	
20	60	(Russia) Vladimir Ivanov	Yamaha YZF-R6	23	+42.593	23	
21	17	(Portugal) Miguel Praia	Honda CBR600RR	23	+47.793	27	
22	10	(Spain) Arturo Tizón	Yamaha YZF-R6	23	+55.885	31	
23	46	(Germany) Jesco Günther	Honda CBR600RR	23	+56.187	32	
24	44	(Spain) David Salom	Yamaha YZF-R6	22	+1 lap	30	
DSQ	16	(France) Sébastien Charpentier	Honda CBR600RR	23	(+32.141)	1	
Ret	21	(Japan) Katsuaki Fujiwara	Honda CBR600RR	16	Technical problem	3	
Ret	31	(Finland) Vesa Kallio	Suzuki GSX-R600	12	Technical problem	20	
Ret	125	(Australia) Josh Brookes	Honda CBR600RR	11	Retirement	15	
Ret	116	(Italy) Simone Sanna	Honda CBR600RR	11	Retirement	17	
Ret	69	(Italy) Gianluca Nannelli	Ducati 749R	10	Retirement	16	
Ret	173	(Austria) Christian Zaiser	Ducati 749R	5	Retirement	29	
DSQ	72	(Hungary) Attila Magda	Yamaha YZF-R6	5	(Retirement)	33	
Ret	18	(United Kingdom) Craig Jones	Honda CBR600RR	4	Accident	8	
DNS	169	(France) Julien Enjolras	Yamaha YZF-R6		Did not start		
WD	34	(Italy) Davide Giugliano	Kawasaki ZX-6R		Withdrew		

== Superstock 1000 race classification ==
Pos	No	Rider	Bike	Laps	Time	Grid	Points
1	59	(Italy) Niccolò Canepa	Ducati 1098S	14	21:07.922	2	25
2	19	(Belgium) Xavier Simeon	Suzuki GSX-R1000 K6	14	+0.654	4	20
3	71	(Italy) Claudio Corti	Yamaha YZF-R1	14	+2.212	1	16
4	15	(Italy) Matteo Baiocco	Yamaha YZF-R1	14	+2.394	3	13
5	155	(Australia) Brendan Roberts	Ducati 1098S	14	+3.130	6	11
6	86	(Italy) Ayrton Badovini	MV Agusta F4 312 R	14	+3.566	12	10
7	57	(Italy) Ilario Dionisi	Suzuki GSX-R1000 K6	14	+4.640	7	9
8	3	(Australia) Mark Aitchison	Suzuki GSX-R1000 K6	14	+5.763	8	8
9	51	(Italy) Michele Pirro	Yamaha YZF-R1	14	+10.051	5	7
10	49	(Germany) Arne Tode	Honda CBR1000RR	14	+10.284	13	6
11	96	(Czech Republic) Matěj Smrž	Honda CBR1000RR	14	+13.642	14	5
12	32	(South Africa) Sheridan Morais	Ducati 1098S	14	+14.439	10	4
13	11	(Italy) Denis Sacchetti	MV Agusta F4 312 R	14	+20.329	11	3
14	99	(Italy) Danilo Dell'Omo	MV Agusta F4 312 R	14	+25.853	15	2
15	77	(United Kingdom) Barry Burrell	Honda CBR1000RR	14	+25.994	24	1
16	21	(Belgium) Wim Van Den Broeck	Yamaha YZF-R1	14	+27.440	22	
17	16	(Netherlands) Raymond Schouten	Yamaha YZF-R1	14	+27.666	17	
18	34	(Hungary) Balázs Németh	Suzuki GSX-R1000 K6	14	+27.996	28	
19	88	(Germany) Timo Gieseler	Yamaha YZF-R1	14	+29.434	21	
20	18	(United Kingdom) Matt Bond	Suzuki GSX-R1000 K6	14	+29.474	30	
21	25	(Germany) Dario Giuseppetti	Yamaha YZF-R1	14	+30.395	19	
22	23	(France) Cédric Tangre	Yamaha YZF-R1	14	+30.919	29	
23	37	(Italy) Raffaele Filice	Suzuki GSX-R1000 K6	14	+30.922	26	
24	10	(France) Franck Millet	MV Agusta F4 312 R	14	+38.404	31	
25	8	(United Kingdom) Victor Cox	MV Agusta F4 312 R	14	+38.710	25	
26	20	(United Kingdom) Jon Boy Lee	Yamaha YZF-R1	14	+40.428	33	
27	75	(Slovenia) Luka Nedog	Ducati 1098S	14	+43.872	20	
28	24	(Slovenia) Marko Jerman	Yamaha YZF-R1	14	+43.919	32	
29	29	(Italy) Niccolò Rosso	MV Agusta F4 312 R	14	+56.729	36	
30	33	(Estonia) Marko Rohtlaan	Honda CBR1000RR	14	+1:10.510	27	
31	13	(Hungary) Victor Kispataki	Suzuki GSX-R1000 K6	13	+1 lap	34	
Ret	134	(South Africa) Greg Gildenhuys	Ducati 1098S	11	Technical problem	18	
Ret	44	(Austria) René Mähr	Yamaha YZF-R1	4	Retirement	16	
Ret	56	(Switzerland) Daniel Sutter	Yamaha YZF-R1	2	Accident	23	
Ret	83	(Belgium) Didier Van Keymeulen	Yamaha YZF-R1	2	Retirement	9	
DNS	5	(Netherlands) Bram Appelo	Honda CBR1000RR	0	Did not start	35	
DNS	55	(Belgium) Olivier Depoorter	Yamaha YZF-R1		Did not start		
DNQ	58	(Italy) Robert Gianfardoni	Yamaha YZF-R1		Did not qualify		

=== STK600 race 1 classification ===
Pos.	No.	Rider	Bike	Laps	Time/Retired	Grid	Points
1	21	(France) Maxime Berger	Yamaha YZF-R6	11	16:59.101	1	25
2	89	(Italy) Domenico Colucci	Ducati 749R	11	+0.617	6	20
3	119	(Italy) Michele Magnoni	Yamaha YZF-R6	11	+2.777	7	16
4	8	(Italy) Andrea Antonelli	Honda CBR600RR	11	+2.877	4	13
5	199	(United Kingdom) Gregg Black	Yamaha YZF-R6	11	+5.582	11	11
6	20	(France) Sylvain Barrier	Yamaha YZF-R6	11	+5.752	8	10
7	30	(Switzerland) Michaël Savary	Yamaha YZF-R6	11	+6.371	10	9
8	55	(Belgium) Vincent Lonbois	Suzuki GSX-R600	11	+9.989	9	8
9	111	(Czech Republic) Michal Šembera	Honda CBR600RR	11	+11.984	15	7
10	24	(Italy) Daniele Beretta	Suzuki GSX-R600	11	+12.746	14	6
11	44	(United Kingdom) Gino Rea	Suzuki GSX-R600	11	+13.331	22	5
12	10	(United Kingdom) Leon Hunt	Honda CBR600RR	11	+14.602	17	4
13	31	(Italy) Giuseppe Barone	Honda CBR600RR	11	+18.665	13	3
14	72	(United Kingdom) Alex Gault	Suzuki GSX-R600	11	+21.843	24	2
15	69	(Czech Republic) Ondřej Ježek	Kawasaki ZX-6R	11	+22.106	18	1
16	81	(Czech Republic) Patrik Vostárek	Honda CBR600RR	11	+22.245	25	
17	43	(Italy) Daniele Rossi	Honda CBR600RR	11	+22.530	12	
18	22	(Italy) Gabriele Poma	Yamaha YZF-R6	11	+27.178	19	
19	28	(Spain) Yannick Guerra	Yamaha YZF-R6	11	+27.524	26	
20	57	(Denmark) Kenny Tirsgaard	Suzuki GSX-R600	11	+27.892	21	
21	34	(United Kingdom) Jay Dunn	Honda CBR600RR	11	+29.173	27	
22	66	(Netherlands) Branko Srdanov	Yamaha YZF-R6	11	+51.756	29	
23	25	(Australia) Ryan Taylor	Kawasaki ZX-6R	11	+1:05.954	30	
24	114	(Belgium) Nicolas Pirot	Yamaha YZF-R6	11	+1:06.515	28	
25	82	(Spain) Adrian Bonastre	Yamaha YZF-R6	10	+1 lap	16	
Ret	4	(France) Mathieu Gines	Yamaha YZF-R6	7	Accident	3	
Ret	99	(Netherlands) Roy Ten Napel	Yamaha YZF-R6	6	Accident	2	
Ret	48	(Russia) Vladimir Leonov	Yamaha YZF-R6	6	Retirement	23	
Ret	7	(Italy) Renato Costantini	Honda CBR600RR	5	Accident	5	
Ret	47	(Italy) Eddi La Marra	Honda CBR600RR	0	Retirement	20	
WD	35	(Bulgaria) Radostin Todorov	Yamaha YZF-R6		Withdrew		

=== STK600 race 2 classification ===
Pos.	No.	Rider	Bike	Laps	Time/Retired	Grid	Points
1	21	(France) Maxime Berger	Yamaha YZF-R6	11	16:56.852	1	25
2	8	(Italy) Andrea Antonelli	Honda CBR600RR	11	+0.308	4	20
3	199	(United Kingdom) Gregg Black	Yamaha YZF-R6	11	+2.337	11	16
4	119	(Italy) Michele Magnoni	Yamaha YZF-R6	11	+10.998	7	13
5	30	(Switzerland) Michaël Savary	Yamaha YZF-R6	11	+11.615	10	11
6	55	(Belgium) Vincent Lonbois	Suzuki GSX-R600	11	+11.785	9	10
7	24	(Italy) Daniele Beretta	Suzuki GSX-R600	11	+14.004	14	9
8	7	(Italy) Renato Costantini	Honda CBR600RR	11	+14.079	5	8
9	82	(Spain) Adrian Bonastre	Yamaha YZF-R6	11	+14.255	16	7
10	99	(Netherlands) Roy Ten Napel	Yamaha YZF-R6	11	+14.414	2	6
11	31	(Italy) Giuseppe Barone	Honda CBR600RR	11	+16.344	13	5
12	10	(United Kingdom) Leon Hunt	Honda CBR600RR	11	+16.513	17	4
13	44	(United Kingdom) Gino Rea	Suzuki GSX-R600	11	+22.585	22	3
14	81	(Czech Republic) Patrik Vostárek	Honda CBR600RR	11	+24.610	25	2
15	48	(Russia) Vladimir Leonov	Yamaha YZF-R6	11	+26.250	23	1
16	57	(Denmark) Kenny Tirsgaard	Suzuki GSX-R600	11	+26.484	21	
17	69	(Czech Republic) Ondřej Ježek	Kawasaki ZX-6R	11	+27.002	18	
18	72	(United Kingdom) Alex Gault	Suzuki GSX-R600	11	+27.059	24	
19	22	(Italy) Gabriele Poma	Yamaha YZF-R6	11	+27.122	19	
20	34	(United Kingdom) Jay Dunn	Honda CBR600RR	11	+30.802	27	
21	28	(Spain) Yannick Guerra	Yamaha YZF-R6	11	+33.433	26	
22	47	(Italy) Eddi La Marra	Honda CBR600RR	11	+34.306	20	
23	114	(Belgium) Nicolas Pirot	Yamaha YZF-R6	11	+50.822	28	
24	43	(Italy) Daniele Rossi	Honda CBR600RR	11	+50.946	12	
25	66	(Netherlands) Branko Srdanov	Yamaha YZF-R6	11	+55.342	29	
26	25	(Australia) Ryan Taylor	Kawasaki ZX-6R	11	+55.935	30	
Ret	20	(France) Sylvain Barrier	Yamaha YZF-R6	10	Accident	8	
Ret	111	(Czech Republic) Michal Šembera	Honda CBR600RR	10	Retirement	15	
Ret	4	(France) Mathieu Gines	Yamaha YZF-R6	9	Accident	3	
Ret	89	(Italy) Domenico Colucci	Ducati 749R	6	Accident	6	
WD	35	(Bulgaria) Radostin Todorov	Yamaha YZF-R6		Withdrew		
