= 2007 Brno Superbike World Championship round =

Round of an athletic world championship

(Czech Republic) 2007 Brno Superbike World Championship round
Round details
- Round 9 of 13 rounds in the 2007 Superbike World Championship. and Round 9 of 13 rounds in the 2007 Supersport World Championship.
- Date: July 22, 2007
- Location: Masaryk Circuit
- Course: Permanent racing facility 5.403 km (3.357 mi)

Superbike World Championship
Pole position
(Japan) Noriyuki Haga
1:59.603
Fastest lap race 1	Fastest lap race 2
(Japan) Noriyuki Haga	(Australia) Troy Corser
2:01.543	2:00.674

Supersport World Championship
Pole position
(Turkey) Kenan Sofuoğlu
2:04.871
Fastest lap
(Turkey) Kenan Sofuoğlu
2:06.089

The 2007 Brno Superbike World Championship round was the ninth round of the 2007 Superbike World Championship. It took place on the weekend of July 20–22, 2007, at the Masaryk Circuit located in Brno.

== Superbike race 1 classification ==
Pos	No	Rider	Bike	Laps	Time	Grid	Points
1	52	(United Kingdom) James Toseland	Honda CBR1000RR	20	41:02.730	4	25
2	3	(Italy) Max Biaggi	Suzuki GSX-R1000 K7	20	+0.237	2	20
3	71	(Japan) Yukio Kagayama	Suzuki GSX-R1000 K7	20	+1.185	6	16
4	41	(Japan) Noriyuki Haga	Yamaha YZF-R1	20	+2.403	1	13
5	44	(Italy) Roberto Rolfo	Honda CBR1000RR	20	+3.472	9	11
6	84	(Italy) Michel Fabrizio	Honda CBR1000RR	20	+3.758	10	10
7	11	(Australia) Troy Corser	Yamaha YZF-R1	20	+18.235	5	9
8	57	(Italy) Lorenzo Lanzi	Ducati 999 F07	20	+19.653	7	8
9	76	(Germany) Max Neukirchner	Suzuki GSX-R1000 K6	20	+22.230	8	7
10	38	(Japan) Shinichi Nakatomi	Yamaha YZF-R1	20	+31.662	13	6
11	55	(France) Régis Laconi	Kawasaki ZX-10R	20	+32.796	15	5
12	111	(Spain) Rubén Xaus	Ducati 999 F06	20	+47.360	14	4
13	13	(Italy) Vittorio Iannuzzo	Kawasaki ZX-10R	20	+1:01.983	17	3
14	36	(Czech Republic) Jiří Dražďák	Yamaha YZF-R1	20	+1:02.052	18	2
15	112	(Italy) Stefano Cruciani	Suzuki GSX-R1000 K6	20	+1:48.872	23	1
Ret	15	(Czech Republic) Miloš Čihák	Suzuki GSX-R1000 K6	19	Retirement	22	
Ret	96	(Czech Republic) Jakub Smrž	Ducati 999 F05	12	Retirement	16	
Ret	21	(Australia) Troy Bayliss	Ducati 999 F07	11	Retirement	3	
Ret	31	(Australia) Karl Muggeridge	Honda CBR1000RR	11	Retirement	11	
Ret	10	(Spain) Fonsi Nieto	Kawasaki ZX-10R	4	Retirement	12	
Ret	73	(Austria) Christian Zaiser	MV Agusta F4 312 R	3	Retirement	20	
Ret	42	(United Kingdom) Dean Ellison	Ducati 999RS	2	Retirement	21	
Ret	22	(Italy) Luca Morelli	Honda CBR1000RR	2	Retirement	19	

== Superbike race 2 classification ==
Pos	No	Rider	Bike	Laps	Time	Grid	Points
1	3	(Italy) Max Biaggi	Suzuki GSX-R1000 K7	19	38:53.022	2	25
2	52	(United Kingdom) James Toseland	Honda CBR1000RR	19	+1.510	4	20
3	84	(Italy) Michel Fabrizio	Honda CBR1000RR	19	+5.419	10	16
4	41	(Japan) Noriyuki Haga	Yamaha YZF-R1	19	+6.765	1	13
5	44	(Italy) Roberto Rolfo	Honda CBR1000RR	19	+7.910	9	11
6	21	(Australia) Troy Bayliss	Ducati 999 F07	19	+9.241	3	10
7	57	(Italy) Lorenzo Lanzi	Ducati 999 F07	19	+19.424	7	9
8	10	(Spain) Fonsi Nieto	Kawasaki ZX-10R	19	+24.191	12	8
9	38	(Japan) Shinichi Nakatomi	Yamaha YZF-R1	19	+26.680	13	7
10	111	(Spain) Rubén Xaus	Ducati 999 F06	19	+28.095	14	6
11	31	(Australia) Karl Muggeridge	Honda CBR1000RR	19	+33.256	11	5
12	76	(Germany) Max Neukirchner	Suzuki GSX-R1000 K6	19	+33.352	8	4
13	96	(Czech Republic) Jakub Smrž	Ducati 999 F05	19	+33.495	16	3
14	55	(France) Régis Laconi	Kawasaki ZX-10R	19	+40.453	15	2
15	13	(Italy) Vittorio Iannuzzo	Kawasaki ZX-10R	19	+57.284	17	1
16	22	(Italy) Luca Morelli	Honda CBR1000RR	19	+1:17.657	19	
17	15	(Czech Republic) Miloš Čihák	Suzuki GSX-R1000 K6	19	+1:35.801	22	
18	112	(Italy) Stefano Cruciani	Suzuki GSX-R1000 K6	19	+1:37.346	23	
Ret	73	(Austria) Christian Zaiser	MV Agusta F4 312 R	14	Retirement	20	
Ret	71	(Japan) Yukio Kagayama	Suzuki GSX-R1000 K7	10	Retirement	6	
Ret	36	(Czech Republic) Jiří Dražďák	Yamaha YZF-R1	7	Retirement	18	
Ret	11	(Australia) Troy Corser	Yamaha YZF-R1	6	Retirement	5	
Ret	42	(United Kingdom) Dean Ellison	Ducati 999RS	1	Retirement	21	

== Supersport race classification ==
Pos	No.	Rider	Bike	Laps	Time/Retired	Grid	Points
1	54	(Turkey) Kenan Sofuoğlu	Honda CBR600RR	18	38:09.132	1	25
2	18	(United Kingdom) Craig Jones	Honda CBR600RR	18	+11.313	7	20
3	9	(France) Fabien Foret	Kawasaki ZX-6R	18	+17.527	11	16
4	55	(Italy) Massimo Roccoli	Yamaha YZF-R6	18	+17.566	6	13
5	125	(Australia) Josh Brookes	Honda CBR600RR	18	+18.109	3	11
6	21	(Japan) Katsuaki Fujiwara	Honda CBR600RR	18	+20.163	10	10
7	94	(Spain) David Checa	Yamaha YZF-R6	18	+20.541	9	9
8	16	(France) Sébastien Charpentier	Honda CBR600RR	18	+23.448	5	8
9	194	(France) Sébastien Gimbert	Yamaha YZF-R6	18	+23.855	13	7
10	77	(Netherlands) Barry Veneman	Suzuki GSX-R600	18	+25.863	14	6
11	31	(Finland) Vesa Kallio	Suzuki GSX-R600	18	+25.961	8	5
12	3	(Australia) Jason O'Halloran	Yamaha YZF-R6	18	+32.323	22	4
13	23	(Australia) Broc Parkes	Yamaha YZF-R6	18	+33.714	2	3
14	4	(Italy) Lorenzo Alfonsi	Honda CBR600RR	18	+34.462	19	2
15	69	(Italy) Gianluca Nannelli	Ducati 749R	18	+34.578	17	1
16	38	(France) Grégory Leblanc	Honda CBR600RR	18	+37.642	16	
17	26	(Spain) Joan Lascorz	Honda CBR600RR	18	+38.559	15	
18	12	(Spain) Javier Forés	Honda CBR600RR	18	+38.584	20	
19	10	(Spain) Arturo Tizón	Yamaha YZF-R6	18	+50.145	21	
20	34	(Italy) Davide Giugliano	Kawasaki ZX-6R	18	+50.474	30	
21	44	(Spain) David Salom	Yamaha YZF-R6	18	+50.647	25	
22	169	(France) Julien Enjolras	Yamaha YZF-R6	18	+50.720	31	
23	79	(Czech Republic) Michal Filla	Yamaha YZF-R6	18	+51.055	34	
24	78	(Czech Republic) Radomil Rous	Yamaha YZF-R6	18	+51.206	27	
25	7	(Spain) Pere Riba	Kawasaki ZX-6R	18	+54.672	26	
Ret	127	(Denmark) Robbin Harms	Honda CBR600RR	17	Accident	4	
Ret	60	(Russia) Vladimir Ivanov	Yamaha YZF-R6	16	Retirement	18	
Ret	17	(Portugal) Miguel Praia	Honda CBR600RR	11	Retirement	29	
Ret	88	(Hungary) Gergő Talmácsi	Yamaha YZF-R6	9	Retirement	35	
Ret	96	(Sweden) Nikola Milovanovic	Honda CBR600RR	9	Retirement	36	
Ret	81	(France) Matthieu Lagrive	Honda CBR600RR	7	Retirement	23	
Ret	45	(Italy) Gianluca Vizziello	Yamaha YZF-R6	6	Retirement	12	
Ret	91	(Germany) Christian Kellner	Ducati 749R	6	Retirement	32	
Ret	116	(Italy) Simone Sanna	Honda CBR600RR	5	Retirement	24	
Ret	35	(Italy) Giles Boccolini	Kawasaki ZX-6R	4	Accident	28	
Ret	46	(Germany) Jesco Günther	Honda CBR600RR	0	Accident	33	
DNS	37	(San Marino) William De Angelis	Honda CBR600RR		Did not start		

== Superstock 1000 race classification ==
Pos	No	Rider	Bike	Laps	Time	Grid	Points
1	19	(Belgium) Xavier Simeon	Suzuki GSX-R1000 K6	12	25:31.786	5	25
2	15	(Italy) Matteo Baiocco	Yamaha YZF-R1	12	+0.882	8	20
3	71	(Italy) Claudio Corti	Yamaha YZF-R1	12	+3.644	12	16
4	3	(Australia) Mark Aitchison	Suzuki GSX-R1000 K6	12	+3.793	10	13
5	51	(Italy) Michele Pirro	Yamaha YZF-R1	12	+5.219	4	11
6	44	(Austria) René Mähr	Yamaha YZF-R1	12	+7.111	14	10
7	59	(Italy) Niccolò Canepa	Ducati 1098S	12	+7.585	1	9
8	83	(Belgium) Didier Van Keymeulen	Yamaha YZF-R1	12	+8.411	3	8
9	57	(Italy) Ilario Dionisi	Suzuki GSX-R1000 K6	12	+8.855	9	7
10	96	(Czech Republic) Matěj Smrž	Honda CBR1000RR	12	+14.651	15	6
11	25	(Germany) Dario Giuseppetti	Yamaha YZF-R1	12	+17.738	11	5
12	11	(Italy) Denis Sacchetti	MV Agusta F4 312 R	12	+18.379	13	4
13	34	(Hungary) Balázs Németh	Suzuki GSX-R1000 K6	12	+19.273	24	3
14	99	(Italy) Danilo Dell'Omo	MV Agusta F4 312 R	12	+21.973	16	2
15	88	(Germany) Timo Gieseler	Yamaha YZF-R1	12	+22.166	20	1
16	16	(Netherlands) Raymond Schouten	Yamaha YZF-R1	12	+24.768	17	
17	56	(Switzerland) Daniel Sutter	Yamaha YZF-R1	12	+25.363	19	
18	10	(France) Franck Millet	MV Agusta F4 312 R	12	+26.124	27	
19	37	(Italy) Raffaele Filice	Suzuki GSX-R1000 K6	12	+30.459	33	
20	33	(Estonia) Marko Rohtlaan	Honda CBR1000RR	12	+30.629	28	
21	13	(Hungary) Victor Kispataki	Suzuki GSX-R1000 K6	12	+30.938	30	
22	24	(Slovenia) Marko Jerman	Yamaha YZF-R1	12	+31.137	25	
23	23	(France) Cédric Tangre	Yamaha YZF-R1	12	+36.935	32	
24	17	(Czech Republic) Milos Urbanec	Suzuki GSX-R1000 K6	12	+37.909	31	
25	75	(Slovenia) Luka Nedog	Ducati 1098S	12	+44.758	29	
26	5	(Netherlands) Bram Appelo	Honda CBR1000RR	12	+49.212	36	
27	134	(South Africa) Greg Gildenhuys	Ducati 1098S	12	+52.960	23	
28	58	(Italy) Robert Gianfardoni	Yamaha YZF-R1	12	+1:38.930	37	
Ret	86	(Italy) Ayrton Badovini	MV Agusta F4 312 R	11	Accident	2	
Ret	55	(Belgium) Olivier Depoorter	Yamaha YZF-R1	11	Accident	21	
Ret	21	(Belgium) Wim Van Den Broeck	Yamaha YZF-R1	10	Retirement	34	
Ret	155	(Australia) Brendan Roberts	Ducati 1098S	6	Accident	7	
Ret	49	(Germany) Arne Tode	Honda CBR1000RR	5	Accident	6	
Ret	77	(United Kingdom) Barry Burrell	Honda CBR1000RR	3	Technical problem	26	
Ret	29	(Italy) Niccolò Rosso	MV Agusta F4 312 R	2	Retirement	35	
Ret	2	(Poland) Bartłomiej Wiczynski	Suzuki GSX-R1000 K6	0	Accident	22	
Ret	32	(South Africa) Sheridan Morais	Ducati 1098S	0	Accident	18	
DNS	42	(Germany) Leonardo Biliotti	MV Agusta F4 312 R		Did not start		
DNS	18	(United Kingdom) Matt Bond	Suzuki GSX-R1000 K6		Did not start		

=== STK600 race classification ===
Pos.	No.	Rider	Bike	Laps	Time/Retired	Grid	Points
1	89	(Italy) Domenico Colucci	Ducati 749R	6	13:02.268	4	25
2	20	(France) Sylvain Barrier	Yamaha YZF-R6	6	+0.190	3	20
3	21	(France) Maxime Berger	Yamaha YZF-R6	6	+2.847	2	16
4	99	(Netherlands) Roy Ten Napel	Yamaha YZF-R6	6	+3.121	1	13
5	8	(Italy) Andrea Antonelli	Honda CBR600RR	6	+6.966	6	11
6	199	(United Kingdom) Gregg Black	Yamaha YZF-R6	6	+10.484	10	10
7	30	(Switzerland) Michaël Savary	Yamaha YZF-R6	6	+10.870	21	9
8	119	(Italy) Michele Magnoni	Yamaha YZF-R6	6	+11.283	17	8
9	7	(Italy) Michele Magnoni	Yamaha YZF-R6	6	+11.505	12	7
10	81	(Czech Republic) Patrik Vostárek	Honda CBR600RR	6	+11.716	8	6
11	44	(United Kingdom) Gino Rea	Suzuki GSX-R600	6	+12.039	16	5
12	82	(Spain) Adrian Bonastre	Yamaha YZF-R6	6	+12.919	11	4
13	27	(South Africa) Chris Leeson	Suzuki GSX-R600	6	+13.078	14	3
14	69	(Czech Republic) Ondřej Ježek	Kawasaki ZX-6R	6	+14.079	18	2
15	24	(Italy) Daniele Beretta	Suzuki GSX-R600	6	+14.358	13	1
16	73	(Poland) Andrzej Chmielewski	Suzuki GSX-R600	6	+15.006	22	
17	22	(Italy) Gabriele Poma	Yamaha YZF-R6	6	+15.103	9	
18	55	(Belgium) Vincent Lonbois	Suzuki GSX-R600	6	+15.268	25	
19	57	(Denmark) Kenny Tirsgaard	Suzuki GSX-R600	6	+18.145	27	
20	43	(Italy) Daniele Rossi	Honda CBR600RR	6	+18.354	15	
21	47	(Italy) Eddi La Marra	Honda CBR600RR	6	+18.668	20	
22	34	(United Kingdom) Jay Dunn	Honda CBR600RR	6	+22.263	29	
23	18	(Austria) Stefan Kerschbaumer	Honda CBR600RR	6	+22.479	23	
24	48	(Russia) Vladimir Leonov	Yamaha YZF-R6	6	+22.812	28	
25	31	(Italy) Giuseppe Barone	Honda CBR600RR	6	+23.164	24	
26	114	(Belgium) Nicolas Pirot	Yamaha YZF-R6	6	+28.488	30	
27	28	(Spain) Yannick Guerra	Yamaha YZF-R6	6	+30.409	32	
28	6	(Poland) Mateusz Stoklosa	Yamaha YZF-R6	6	+38.900	26	
29	65	(Slovakia) Tomáš Svitok	Kawasaki ZX-6R	6	+42.593	31	
30	66	(Netherlands) Branko Srdanov	Yamaha YZF-R6	6	+45.817	34	
31	25	(Australia) Ryan Taylor	Kawasaki ZX-6R	6	+48.140	36	
32	19	(Netherlands) Nigel Walraven	Suzuki GSX-R600	6	+48.518	35	
DSQ	111	(Czech Republic) Michal Šembera	Honda CBR600RR	6	(+10.068)	5	
DSQ	41	(Switzerland) Gregory Junod	Yamaha YZF-R6	6	(+11.071)	19	
DNS	35	(Bulgaria) Radostin Todorov	Yamaha YZF-R6	0	Did not start	33	
DNS	4	(France) Mathieu Gines	Yamaha YZF-R6	0	Did not start	7	
WD	26	(South Africa) Ronan Quarmby	Kawasaki ZX-6R		Withdrew		
