= 2008 Brands Hatch Superbike World Championship round =

(United Kingdom) 2008 Brands Hatch Superbike World Championship round
Round details
- Round 10 of 14 rounds in the 2008 Superbike World Championship. and Round 9 of 13 rounds in the 2008 Supersport World Championship.
- Date: August 3, 2008
- Location: Brands Hatch
- Course: Permanent racing facility 3.702 km (2.300 mi)

Superbike World Championship
Pole position
(Australia) Troy Bayliss
1:25.656
Fastest lap race 1	Fastest lap race 2
(Japan) Ryuichi Kiyonari	(Italy) Michel Fabrizio
1:26.560	1:26.362

Supersport World Championship
Pole position
(France) Matthieu Lagrive
1:28.003
Fastest lap
(Australia) Andrew Pitt
1:28.399

The 2008 Brands Hatch Superbike World Championship round was the tenth round of the 2008 Superbike World Championship. It took place on the weekend of August 1–3, 2008, at the Brands Hatch circuit. The round was marred by the death of Craig Jones during the Supersport race.

== Superbike race 1 classification ==
Pos	No	Rider	Bike	Laps	Time	Grid	Points
1	23	(Japan) Ryuichi Kiyonari	Honda CBR1000RR	25	36:18.607	3	25
2	21	(Australia) Troy Bayliss	Ducati 1098 F08	25	+0.137	1	20
3	3	(Italy) Max Biaggi	Ducati 1098 RS 08	25	+0.180	7	16
4	34	(Japan) Yukio Kagayama	Suzuki GSX-R1000	25	+5.733	9	13
5	10	(Spain) Fonsi Nieto	Suzuki GSX-R1000	25	+6.499	10	11
6	7	(Spain) Carlos Checa	Honda CBR1000RR	25	+6.984	11	10
7	76	(Germany) Max Neukirchner	Suzuki GSX-R1000	25	+8.300	8	9
8	11	(Australia) Troy Corser	Yamaha YZF-R1	25	+10.732	5	8
9	96	(Czech Republic) Jakub Smrz	Ducati 1098 RS 08	25	+16.547	4	7
10	44	(Italy) Roberto Rolfo	Honda CBR1000RR	25	+16.569	19	6
11	57	(Italy) Lorenzo Lanzi	Ducati 1098 RS 08	25	+18.366	14	5
12	84	(Italy) Michel Fabrizio	Ducati 1098 F08	25	+22.308	12	4
13	54	(Turkey) Kenan Sofuoğlu	Honda CBR1000RR	25	+26.788	17	3
14	36	(Spain) Gregorio Lavilla	Honda CBR1000RR	25	+26.856	13	2
15	9	(United Kingdom) Chris Walker	Honda CBR1000RR	25	+32.877	23	1
16	31	(Australia) Karl Muggeridge	Honda CBR1000RR	25	+38.329	16	
17	94	(Spain) David Checa	Yamaha YZF-R1	25	+46.868	20	
18	100	(Japan) Makoto Tamada	Kawasaki ZX-10R	25	+48.417	25	
19	41	(Japan) Noriyuki Haga	Yamaha YZF-R1	25	+58.986	2	
20	13	(Italy) Vittorio Iannuzzo	Kawasaki ZX-10R	25	+1:06.028	26	
21	22	(Italy) Luca Morelli	Honda CBR1000RR	25	+1:09.376	29	
22	43	(United States) Jason Pridmore	Honda CBR1000RR	25	+1:09.475	27	
23	73	(Austria) Christian Zaiser	Yamaha YZF-R1	25	+1:22.214	30	
Ret	55	(France) Régis Laconi	Kawasaki ZX-10R	22	Accident	22	
Ret	86	(Italy) Ayrton Badovini	Kawasaki ZX-10R	16	Retirement	21	
Ret	194	(France) Sébastien Gimbert	Yamaha YZF-R1	12	Retirement	18	
Ret	66	(United Kingdom) Tom Sykes	Suzuki GSX-R1000	9	Retirement	6	
Ret	17	(United Kingdom) Tristan Palmer	Yamaha YZF-R1	7	Retirement	28	
Ret	88	(Japan) Shuhei Aoyama	Honda CBR1000RR	3	Retirement	24	

== Superbike race 2 classification ==
Pos	No	Rider	Bike	Laps	Time	Grid	Points
1	23	(Japan) Ryuichi Kiyonari	Honda CBR1000RR	25	36:14.904	3	25
2	41	(Japan) Noriyuki Haga	Yamaha YZF-R1	25	+1.848	2	20
3	11	(Australia) Troy Corser	Yamaha YZF-R1	25	+8.883	5	16
4	76	(Germany) Max Neukirchner	Suzuki GSX-R1000	25	+11.180	8	13
5	10	(Spain) Fonsi Nieto	Suzuki GSX-R1000	25	+12.928	10	11
6	84	(Italy) Michel Fabrizio	Ducati 1098 F08	25	+13.696	12	10
7	66	(United Kingdom) Tom Sykes	Suzuki GSX-R1000	25	+13.872	6	9
8	7	(Spain) Carlos Checa	Honda CBR1000RR	25	+14.009	11	8
9	96	(Czech Republic) Jakub Smrz	Ducati 1098 RS 08	25	+19.065	4	7
10	57	(Italy) Lorenzo Lanzi	Ducati 1098 RS 08	25	+19.864	14	6
11	21	(Australia) Troy Bayliss	Ducati 1098 F08	25	+20.479	1	5
12	3	(Italy) Max Biaggi	Ducati 1098 RS 08	25	+20.621	7	4
13	36	(Spain) Gregorio Lavilla	Honda CBR1000RR	25	+20.722	13	3
14	44	(Italy) Roberto Rolfo	Honda CBR1000RR	25	+24.512	19	2
15	9	(United Kingdom) Chris Walker	Honda CBR1000RR	25	+32.090	23	1
16	55	(France) Régis Laconi	Kawasaki ZX-10R	25	+32.207	22	
17	54	(Turkey) Kenan Sofuoğlu	Honda CBR1000RR	25	+32.815	17	
18	100	(Japan) Makoto Tamada	Kawasaki ZX-10R	25	+33.648	25	
19	194	(France) Sébastien Gimbert	Yamaha YZF-R1	25	+35.382	18	
20	94	(Spain) David Checa	Yamaha YZF-R1	25	+44.866	20	
21	86	(Italy) Ayrton Badovini	Kawasaki ZX-10R	25	+53.969	21	
22	88	(Japan) Shuhei Aoyama	Honda CBR1000RR	25	+1:00.875	24	
23	43	(United States) Jason Pridmore	Honda CBR1000RR	25	+1:01.104	27	
24	22	(Italy) Luca Morelli	Honda CBR1000RR	25	+1:04.329	29	
25	34	(Japan) Yukio Kagayama	Suzuki GSX-R1000	24	+1 Lap	9	
Ret	31	(Australia) Karl Muggeridge	Honda CBR1000RR	17	Retirement	16	
Ret	13	(Italy) Vittorio Iannuzzo	Kawasaki ZX-10R	15	Retirement	26	
Ret	17	(United Kingdom) Tristan Palmer	Yamaha YZF-R1	9	Retirement	28	
Ret	73	(Austria) Christian Zaiser	Yamaha YZF-R1	4	Retirement	30	

== Supersport race classification ==
Pos	No	Rider	Bike	Laps	Time	Grid	Points
1	65	(United Kingdom) Jonathan Rea	Honda CBR600RR	15	22:29.935	2	25
2	18	(United Kingdom) Craig Jones	Honda CBR600RR	15	+0.209/Fatal accident	3	20
3	88	(Australia) Andrew Pitt	Honda CBR600RR	15	+0.664	9	16
4	23	(Australia) Broc Parkes	Yamaha YZF-R6	15	+2.816	4	13
5	25	(Australia) Josh Brookes	Honda CBR600RR	15	+6.789	6	11
6	77	(Netherlands) Barry Veneman	Suzuki GSX-R600	15	+9.094	8	10
7	69	(Italy) Gianluca Nannelli	Honda CBR600RR	15	+15.048	17	9
8	55	(Italy) Massimo Roccoli	Yamaha YZF-R6	15	+15.623	10	8
9	27	(United Kingdom) Rob Frost	Triumph 675	15	+18.393	30	7
10	33	(South Africa) Hudson Kennaugh	Yamaha YZF-R6	15	+19.528	12	6
11	22	(United Kingdom) Steve Plater	Triumph 675	15	+20.034	11	5
12	105	(Italy) Gianluca Vizziello	Honda CBR600RR	15	+22.696	14	4
13	31	(Finland) Vesa Kallio	Honda CBR600RR	15	+25.049	19	3
14	26	(Spain) Joan Lascorz	Honda CBR600RR	15	+27.102	13	2
15	81	(United Kingdom) Graeme Gowland	Honda CBR600RR	15	+35.504	27	1
16	199	(Italy) Danilo dell'Omo	Honda CBR600RR	15	+39.023	24	
17	53	(New Zealand) Midge Smart	Honda CBR600RR	15	+40.820	29	
18	19	(Poland) Pawel Szkopek	Triumph 675	15	+43.635	23	
19	14	(France) Matthieu Lagrive	Honda CBR600RR	15	+46.776	1	
20	30	(Germany) Jesco Gunther	Honda CBR600RR	15	+47.298	32	
21	44	(Spain) David Salom	Yamaha YZF-R6	15	+47.353	18	
22	117	(Italy) Denis Sacchetti	Honda CBR600RR	15	+48.191	33	
23	34	(Hungary) Balázs Németh	Honda CBR600RR	15	+49.480	35	
24	12	(Spain) Javier Hidalgo	Yamaha YZF-R6	15	+54.083	28	
25	37	(San Marino) William de Angelis	Honda CBR600RR	15	+59.436	34	
26	28	(Italy) Ruggero Scambia	Triumph 675	15	+1:20.165	36	
27	4	(Italy) Lorenzo Alfonsi	Honda CBR600RR	15	+1:44.305	25	
28	51	(Spain) Santiago Barragán	Honda CBR600RR	15	+1:55.509	37	
Ret	5	(United Kingdom) Karl Harris	Yamaha YZF-R6	14	Retirement	5	
Ret	21	(Japan) Katsuaki Fujiwara	Kawasaki ZX-6R	12	Retirement	26	
Ret	8	(Australia) Mark Aitchison	Triumph 675	12	Retirement	16	
Ret	126	(United Kingdom) Chris Martin	Kawasaki ZX-6R	11	Retirement	21	
Ret	127	(Denmark) Robbin Harms	Honda CBR600RR	8	Retirement	7	
Ret	11	(Australia) Russell Holland	Honda CBR600RR	8	Retirement	15	
Ret	83	(Belgium) Didier van Keymeulen	Suzuki GSX-R600	7	Retirement	20	
Ret	17	(Portugal) Miguel Praia	Honda CBR600RR	6	Retirement	31	

== Superstock 1000 race classification ==
Pos	No	Rider	Bike	Laps	Time	Grid	Points
1	21	(France) Maxime Berger	Honda CBR1000RR	14	21:56.050	1	25
2	113	(South Africa) Sheridan Morais	Kawasaki ZX-10R	14	+4.172	6	20
3	8	(Italy) Andrea Antonelli	Honda CBR1000RR	14	+5.808	7	16
4	155	(Australia) Brendan Roberts	Ducati 1098R	14	+18.391	3	13
5	53	(Italy) Alessandro Polita	Ducati 1098R	14	+18.629	13	11
6	51	(Italy) Michele Pirro	Yamaha YZF-R1	14	+19.049	2	10
7	77	(United Kingdom) Barry Burrell	Honda CBR1000RR	14	+19.468	14	9
8	71	(Italy) Claudio Corti	Yamaha YZF-R1	14	+24.682	5	8
9	23	(Australia) Chris Seaton	Suzuki GSX-R1000 K8	14	+26.331	16	7
10	78	(France) Freddy Foray	Suzuki GSX-R1000 K8	14	+38.554	17	6
11	87	(Australia) Gareth Jones	Suzuki GSX-R1000 K8	14	+43.675	29	5
12	30	(Switzerland) Michaël Savary	Suzuki GSX-R1000 K8	14	+43.891	24	4
13	7	(Austria) René Mähr	KTM 1190 RC8	14	+44.375	21	3
14	81	(Finland) Pauli Pekkanen	KTM 1190 RC8	14	+46.011	26	2
15	132	(France) Yoann Tiberio	Kawasaki ZX-10R	14	+48.886	19	1
16	16	(Netherlands) Raymond Schouten	Yamaha YZF-R1	14	+51.075	12	
17	60	(United Kingdom) Peter Hickman	Yamaha YZF-R1	14	+54.111	8	
18	66	(Netherlands) Branko Srdanov	Yamaha YZF-R1	14	+59.631	30	
19	14	(Sweden) Filip Backlund	Suzuki GSX-R1000 K8	14	+1:05.063	23	
20	92	(Slovenia) Jure Stibilj	Honda CBR1000RR	14	+1:05.938	35	
21	119	(Italy) Michele Magnoni	Yamaha YZF-R1	14	+1:07.391	15	
22	18	(United Kingdom) Matt Bond	Suzuki GSX-R1000 K8	14	+1:10.146	27	
23	88	(France) Kenny Foray	Yamaha YZF-R1	14	+1:10.313	20	
24	12	(Italy) Alessio Aldrovandi	Kawasaki ZX-10R	14	+1:13.534	22	
25	58	(Italy) Robert Gianfardoni	Ducati 1098R	14	+1:15.792	37	
26	41	(Switzerland) Gregory Junod	Yamaha YZF-R1	14	+1:25.570	34	
27	24	(Slovenia) Marko Jerman	Honda CBR1000RR	14	+1:26.518	32	
28	5	(Netherlands) Danny De Boer	Suzuki GSX-R1000 K8	13	+1 lap	31	
29	57	(Australia) Cameron Stronach	Kawasaki ZX-10R	11	+3 lap	36	
30	154	(Italy) Tommaso Lorenzetti	Suzuki GSX-R1000 K8	11	Retirement	25	
Ret	15	(Italy) Matteo Baiocco	Kawasaki ZX-10R	10	Accident	9	
Ret	96	(Czech Republic) Matěj Smrž	Honda CBR1000RR	9	Accident	11	
Ret	99	(Netherlands) Roy Ten Napel	Suzuki GSX-R1000 K8	6	Retirement	28	
Ret	34	(Italy) Davide Giugliano	Suzuki GSX-R1000 K8	4	Accident	10	
Ret	107	(Italy) Niccolò Rosso	Honda CBR1000RR	2	Accident	33	
DNS	19	(Belgium) Xavier Simeon	Suzuki GSX-R1000 K8	0	Did not start	4	
DNS	10	(United Kingdom) Jon Kirkham	Yamaha YZF-R1	0	Did not start	18	
DNS	89	(Italy) Domenico Colucci	Ducati 1098R		Did not start		
DNS	90	(Czech Republic) Michal Drobný	Honda CBR1000RR		Did not start		

== Superstock 600 race classification ==
Pos	No	Rider	Bike	Laps	Time	Grid	Points
1	65	(France) Loris Baz	Yamaha YZF-R6	11	16:56.504	1	25
2	44	(United Kingdom) Gino Rea	Yamaha YZF-R6	11	+1.586	3	20
3	24	(Italy) Daniele Beretta	Suzuki GSX-R600	11	+1.744	6	16
4	119	(Italy) Danino Petrucci	Yamaha YZF-R6	11	+9.700	9	13
5	5	(Italy) Marco Bussolotti	Yamaha YZF-R6	11	+9.730	20	11
6	47	(Italy) Eddi La Marra	Suzuki GSX-R600	11	+10.062	4	10
7	94	(France) Mathieu Gines	Yamaha YZF-R6	11	+10.125	11	9
8	99	(United Kingdom) Gregg Black	Yamaha YZF-R6	11	+15.357	23	8
9	7	(Italy) Renato Costantini	Yamaha YZF-R6	11	+16.067	13	7
10	16	(United Kingdom) Leon Hunt	Yamaha YZF-R6	11	+18.840	8	6
11	11	(France) Jérémy Guarnoni	Yamaha YZF-R6	11	+19.549	14	5
12	111	(Czech Republic) Michal Šembera	Honda CBR600RR	11	+19.696	10	4
13	56	(United Kingdom) David Paton	Honda CBR600RR	11	+20.106	15	3
14	36	(Italy) Davide Fanelli	Triumph 675	11	+20.381	12	2
15	30	(Republic of Ireland) Jamie Hamilton	Kawasaki ZX-6R	11	+23.851	19	1
16	88	(Spain) Yannick Guerra	Yamaha YZF-R6	11	+29.561	24	
17	18	(France) Nicolas Pouhair	Yamaha YZF-R6	11	+29.697	36	
18	96	(United Kingdom) Daniel Brill	Honda CBR600RR	11	+30.202	25	
19	3	(Italy) Giuliano Gregorini	Honda CBR600RR	11	+30.545	31	
20	21	(United Kingdom) Alex Lowes	Kawasaki ZX-6R	11	+32.170	17	
21	23	(Switzerland) Christian Von Gunten	Suzuki GSX-R600	11	+32.321	32	
22	42	(Italy) Leonardo Biliotti	Honda CBR600RR	11	+35.102	21	
23	17	(United Kingdom) Robbie Stewart	Triumph 675	11	+35.385	34	
24	54	(United Kingdom) Jack Groves	Yamaha YZF-R6	11	+35.456	22	
25	10	(Spain) Nacho Calero	Yamaha YZF-R6	11	+36.165	27	
26	93	(France) Mathieu Lussiana	Yamaha YZF-R6	11	+37.161	28	
27	57	(Denmark) Kenny Tirsgaard	Suzuki GSX-R600	11	+38.445	30	
28	72	(Norway) Fredrik Karlsen	Yamaha YZF-R6	11	+42.127	35	
29	91	(Sweden) Hampus Johansson	Yamaha YZF-R6	11	+49.348	26	
30	40	(Spain) Roman Ramos	Yamaha YZF-R6	9	+2 lap	29	
DSQ	55	(Belgium) Vincent Lonbois	Suzuki GSX-R600	11	(+0.363)	16	
Ret	12	(United Kingdom) Sam Lowes	Honda CBR600RR	10	Accident	5	
Ret	14	(Belgium) Nicolas Pirot	Yamaha YZF-R6	6	Accident	18	
Ret	77	(Czech Republic) Patrik Vostárek	Honda CBR600RR	4	Accident	2	
Ret	45	(United Kingdom) Dan Linfoot	Yamaha YZF-R6	4	Accident	7	
DNS	35	(Italy) Simone Grotzkyj	Honda CBR600RR	0	Did not start	33	
