= 2007 European Superstock 600 Championship =

Motorcycle racing series

2007 European Superstock 600 Championship
Previous:	2006	Next:	2008
Support series: Superbike World Championship; Supersport World Championship; FIM Superstock 1000 Cup

The 2007 European Superstock 600 Championship was the third season of the European Superstock 600 Championship. The season was contested over eleven races, beginning at Donington Park on 1 April and ending at Circuit de Nevers Magny-Cours on 6 October. Maxime Berger clinched the title after beating closest rival Andrea Antonelli.

== Race calendar and results ==
2008 Calendar
Round		Date	Round	Circuit	Pole position	Fastest lap	Race winner	Winning team
1		1 April	Europe	Donington Park	(Italy) Michele Magnoni	(Italy) Domenico Colucci	(Italy) Michele Magnoni	Bevilacqua Corse
2		14 April	Spain	Circuit Ricardo Tormo	(France) Maxime Berger	(Netherlands) Roy Ten Napel	(France) Maxime Berger	Team Trasimeno
3		29 April	Netherlands	TT Circuit Assen	(Netherlands) Roy Ten Napel	(Netherlands) Roy Ten Napel	(Italy) Andrea Antonelli	Team Italia Megabike AX
4		12 May	Italy	Autodromo Nazionale Monza	(Italy) Michele Magnoni	(Italy) Domenico Colucci	(Italy) Michele Magnoni	Bevilacqua Corse
5		27 May	(United Kingdom) Great Britain	Silverstone Circuit	(France) Maxime Berger	Race Cancelled		
6		16 June	San Marino	Misano Adriatico	(Italy) Michele Magnoni	(Italy) Michele Magnoni	(France) Maxime Berger	Team Trasimeno
7		21 July	Czech Republic	Brno Circuit	(Netherlands) Roy Ten Napel	(France) Sylvain Barrier	(Italy) Domenico Colucci	Ducati Xerox Junior Team
8	R1	5 August	(United Kingdom) Great Britain	Brands Hatch	(France) Maxime Berger	(Italy) Domenico Colucci	(France) Maxime Berger	Team Trasimeno
8	R2	5 August	(United Kingdom) Great Britain	Brands Hatch	(France) Maxime Berger	(Italy) Domenico Colucci	(France) Maxime Berger	Team Trasimeno
9		8 September	Germany	Lausitzring	(Netherlands) Roy Ten Napel	(Belgium) Vincent Lonbois	(Belgium) Vincent Lonbois	MTM Racing
10		29 September	Italy	ACI Vallelunga Circuit	(France) Maxime Berger	(Italy) Andrea Antonelli	(Netherlands) Roy Ten Napel	MQP Racing Team
11		6 October	France	Circuit de Nevers Magny-Cours	(France) Maxime Berger	(France) Maxime Berger	(France) Maxime Berger	Team Trasimeno

== Entry list ==
Team	Constructor	Motorcycle	No.	Rider	Rounds
Ducati Xerox Junior Team	Ducati	Ducati 749R	89	(Italy) Domenico Colucci	1–8, 11
CRS Grand Prix	Honda	Honda CBR600RR	10	(United Kingdom) Leon Hunt	1–6, 8–11
EAB Ten Kate Honda	Honda	Honda CBR600RR	111	(Czech Republic) Michal Šembera	All
Intermoto Czech Klaffi	Honda	Honda CBR600RR	81	(Czech Republic) Patrik Vostárek	All
Racing Team - Figaro AT	Honda	Honda CBR600RR	18	(Austria) Stefan Kerschbaumer	7, 10
Team Italia Megabike AX 52	Honda	Honda CBR600RR	7	(Italy) Renato Constantini	All
Team Italia Megabike AX 52	Honda	Honda CBR600RR	8	(Italy) Andrea Antonelli	All
Team Lorini	Honda	Honda CBR600RR	47	(Italy) Eddi La Marra	All
Team O Six	Honda	Honda CBR600RR	31	(Italy) Giuseppe Barone	7–9
Team Rumi Azione Corse	Honda	Honda CBR600RR	31	(Italy) Giuseppe Barone	1–5
Team Rumi Azione Corse	Honda	Honda CBR600RR	34	(United Kingdom) Jay Dunn	7–11
Team Rumi Azione Corse	Honda	Honda CBR600RR	43	(Italy) Daniele Rossi	All
Gold Fren Team Erinac	Kawasaki	Kawasaki ZX-6R	65	(Slovakia) Tomáš Svitok	6
Gold Fren Team Erinac	Kawasaki	Kawasaki ZX-6R	65	(Slovakia) Tomáš Svitok	7
Gold Fren Team Erinac	Kawasaki	Kawasaki ZX-6R	69	(Czech Republic) Ondřej Ježek	1, 7–11
Lightspeed-Kawasaki Supported	Kawasaki	Kawasaki ZX-6R	11	(Italy) Ashley Carlucci	1–2
Lightspeed-Kawasaki Supported	Kawasaki	Kawasaki ZX-6R	12	(Italy) Andrea Boscoscuro	3
Lightspeed-Kawasaki Supported	Kawasaki	Kawasaki ZX-6R	14	(South Africa) Dane Hellyer	9
Lightspeed-Kawasaki Supported	Kawasaki	Kawasaki ZX-6R	25	(Australia) Ryan Taylor	All
Lightspeed-Kawasaki Supported	Kawasaki	Kawasaki ZX-6R	26	(South Africa) Ronan Quarmby	6–7
Team Cheroy Motos	Kawasaki	Kawasaki ZX-6R	189	(France) Axel Maurin	11
Team O Six	Kawasaki	Kawasaki ZX-6R	12	(Italy) Andrea Boscoscuro	10
Team O Six	Kawasaki	Kawasaki ZX-6R	41	(Switzerland) Gregory Junod	1–6
Amici Racing Team	Suzuki	Suzuki GSX-R600R	19	(Netherlands) Nigel Walraven	7
Beowulf Racing.com	Suzuki	Suzuki GSX-R600R	44	(United Kingdom) Gino Rea	All
Cruciani Moto Suzuki Italia	Suzuki	Suzuki GSX-R600R	24	(Italy) Daniele Beretta	All
Dialog Poland Position RT	Suzuki	Suzuki GSX-R600R	73	(Poland) Andrzej Chmielewski	7
Mist Suzuki	Suzuki	Suzuki GSX-R600R	18	(United Kingdom) Daniel Brill	1–2
Mist Suzuki	Suzuki	Suzuki GSX-R600R	27	(South Africa) Chris Leeson	3–5, 7, 9, 11
Mist Suzuki	Suzuki	Suzuki GSX-R600R	72	(United Kingdom) Alex Gault	6, 8
MTM Racing	Suzuki	Suzuki GSX-R600R	55	(Belgium) Vincent Lonbois	All
Road + Racing	Suzuki	Suzuki GSX-R600R	51	(United Kingdom) Jay Dunn	1
TKR Suzuki Switzerland	Suzuki	Suzuki GSX-R600R	2	(Switzerland) Christian Von Gunten	9
TKR Suzuki Switzerland	Suzuki	Suzuki GSX-R600R	57	(Denmark) Kenny Tirsgaard	All
Bevilacqua Corse	Yamaha	Yamaha YZF-R6	119	(Italy) Michele Magnoni	All
Coutelle Junior Team	Yamaha	Yamaha YZF-R6	20	(France) Sylvain Barrier	All
DC Management Gron Sri	Yamaha	Yamaha YZF-R6	88	(Italy) Gianluca Capitini	6
Gallardo I.T.e	Yamaha	Yamaha YZF-R6	26	(South Africa) Ronan Quarmby	5
Hanson Motorsport	Yamaha	Yamaha YZF-R6	91	(Sweden) Hampus Johansson	9
Holiday Gym SBK	Yamaha	Yamaha YZF-R6	28	(Spain) Yannick Guerra	All
Imperiale Corse	Yamaha	Yamaha YZF-R6	32	(Italy) Danilo Petrucci	4, 6, 10
M2 Racing	Yamaha	Yamaha YZF-R6	37	(Italy) Giuliano Gregorini	6, 10
Millet Yamaha Team	Yamaha	Yamaha YZF-R6	30	(Switzerland) Michaël Savary	All
Morillas Bikes	Yamaha	Yamaha YZF-R6	58	(Spain) Eric Morillas	2
MQP Racing Team	Yamaha	Yamaha YZF-R6	66	(Netherlands) Branko Srdanov	All
MQP Racing Team	Yamaha	Yamaha YZF-R6	99	(Netherlands) Roy Ten Napel	All
MRC Team	Yamaha	Yamaha YZF-R6	29	(Italy) Marco Bussolotti	4, 6, 10
Orange Shark DMV Team	Yamaha	Yamaha YZF-R6	3	(Germany) Kevin Wahr	9
Peko Racing Team	Yamaha	Yamaha YZF-R6	4	(France) Mathieu Gines	7–11
Peko Racing Team	Yamaha	Yamaha YZF-R6	41	(Switzerland) Gregory Junod	7, 11
Peko Racing Team	Yamaha	Yamaha YZF-R6	75	(Germany) Dennis Sigloch	1–6
Politas Racing Team; Capaul Black Racing	Yamaha	Yamaha YZF-R6	199	(United Kingdom) Gregg Black	All
Racing Team Ermelo	Yamaha	Yamaha YZF-R6	61	(Netherlands) Mark Ten Napel	3
Scuderia HF	Yamaha	Yamaha YZF-R6	51	(Italy) Nico Morelli	10
Stokson 41-500 Chrozow	Yamaha	Yamaha YZF-R6	6	(Poland) Mateusz Stoklosa	7
Team Bulgaria	Yamaha	Yamaha YZF-R6	35	(Bulgaria) Radostin Todorov	1–2, 4–11
Team Falcone Competition	Yamaha	Yamaha YZF-R6	172	(France) Nicolas Pouhair	11
Team Laglisse	Yamaha	Yamaha YZF-R6	36	(Spain) Alex Cortes	2
Team Trasimeno	Yamaha	Yamaha YZF-R6	21	(France) Maxime Berger	All
Team Trasimeno	Yamaha	Yamaha YZF-R6	22	(Italy) Gabriele Poma	All
Team Zone Rouge	Yamaha	Yamaha YZF-R6	114	(Belgium) Nicolas Pirot	1–4, 6–11
Vector Racing Yamaha	Yamaha	Yamaha YZF-R6	48	(Russia) Vladimir Leonov	1–10
Yamaha Factory	Yamaha	Yamaha YZF-R6	82	(Spain) Adrian Bonastre	7
Yamaha-Moto 1	Yamaha	Yamaha YZF-R6	4	(France) Mathieu Gines	1–6
Yamaha Spain	Yamaha	Yamaha YZF-R6	82	(Spain) Adrian Bonastre	8
Yamaha Spain	Yamaha	Yamaha YZF-R6	112	(Spain) Josep Pedró	1–6, 9–11

Key
Regular rider
Wildcard rider
Replacement rider

- All entries used Pirelli tyres.

== Championship' standings ==
=== Riders' standings ===
Pos	Rider	Bike	DON (Europe)	VAL (Spain)	ASS (Netherlands)	MNZ (Italy)	SIL (United Kingdom)	MIS (San Marino)	BRN (Czech Republic)	BRA (United Kingdom)		LAU (Germany)	VAL (Italy)	MAG (France)	Pts
1	(France) Maxime Berger	Yamaha	5	**1**	3	6	**C**	1	3	**1**	**1**	6	**3**	**1**	204
2	(Italy) Andrea Antonelli	Honda	2	9	1	7	C	5	5	4	2	10	2	2	162
3	(Italy) Michele Magnoni	Yamaha	**1**	7	5	**1**	C	**2**	8	3	4	12	5	4	155
4	(United Kingdom) Gregg Black	Yamaha	11	Ret	4	2	C	WD	6	5	3	2	9	3	118
5	(Netherlands) Roy Ten Napel	Yamaha	6	2	**6**	9	C	11	**4**	Ret	10	**15**	1	5	108
6	(France) Sylvain Barrier	Yamaha	4	Ret	2	4	C	Ret	2	6	Ret	Ret	7	6	95
7	(Italy) Domenico Colucci	Ducati	3	5	Ret	5	C	Ret	1	2	Ret			WD	83
8	(Switzerland) Michaël Savary	Yamaha	8	11	7	11	C	10	7	7	5	Ret	11	7	76
9	(Italy) Daniele Beretta	Suzuki	15	6	11	Ret	C	9	15	10	7	9	4	8	67
10	(Belgium) Vincent Lonbois	Suzuki	22	13	22	21	C	14	18	8	6	1	10	9	61
11	(Italy) Marco Bussolotti	Yamaha				3		3					6		42
12	(United Kingdom) Gino Rea	Suzuki	10	3	23	14	C	15	11	11	13	Ret	24	13	41
13	(Germany) Dennis Sigloch	Yamaha	12	4	9	8	C	8							40
14	(France) Mathieu Gines	Yamaha	7	20	8	10	C	Ret	DNS	Ret	Ret	5	12	Ret	38
15	(Italy) Renato Costantini	Honda	9	Ret	17	12	C	7	9	Ret	8	Ret	19	17	35
16	(Czech Republic) Michal Šembera	Honda	18	15	10	Ret	C	13	DSQ	9	Ret	Ret	13	14	22
17	(Czech Republic) Patrik Vostárek	Honda	16	23	12	17	C	12	10	16	14	Ret	15	11	22
18	(Czech Republic) Ondřej Ježek	Kawasaki	WD						14	15	17	3	16	18	19
19	(Denmark) Kenny Tirsgaard	Suzuki	19	12	19	13	C	6	19	20	16	Ret	27	21	17
20	(United Kingdom) Leon Hunt	Honda	25	19	25	26	C	24		12	12	7	28	26	17
21	(Italy) Giuliano Gregorini	Yamaha						4					Ret		13
22	(South Africa) Dane Hellyer	Kawasaki										4			13
23	(Italy) Giuseppe Barone	Honda	13	22	14	20	C		25	13	11	Ret			13
24	(Spain) Adrian Bonastre	Yamaha							12	25	9				11
25	(Italy) Eddi La Marra	Honda	Ret	8	18	19	C	19	21	Ret	22	14	22	23	10
26	(Spain) Josep Pedró	Yamaha	24	10	13	15	C	WD				16	21	20	10
27	(Spain) Yannick Guerra	Yamaha	23	25	27	23	C	23	27	19	21	8	17	16	8
28	(Italy) Danilo Petrucci	Yamaha				Ret		Ret					8		8
29	(France) Nicolas Pouhair	Yamaha												10	6
30	(Sweden) Hampus Johansson	Yamaha										11			5
31	(Netherlands) Branko Srdanov	Yamaha	26	14	20	24	C	DNS	30	22	25	13	Ret	28	5
32	(France) Axel Maurin	Kawasaki												12	4
33	(South Africa) Chris Leeson	Suzuki			26	18	C		13			Ret		15	4
34	(Switzerland) Gregory Junod	Kawasaki	14	24	15	16	C	20							3
34	(Switzerland) Gregory Junod	Yamaha							DSQ					Ret	3
35	(United Kingdom) Alex Gault	Suzuki						22		14	18				2
36	(Italy) Nico Morelli	Yamaha											14		2
37	(Russia) Vladimir Leonov	Yamaha	27	17	28	22	C	21	24	Ret	15	Ret	23		1
	(Italy) Daniele Rossi	Honda	17	16	24	Ret	C	17	20	17	24	Ret	18	24	0
	(Italy) Andrea Boscoscuro	Kawasaki			16								Ret		0
	(Italy) Gianluca Capitini	Yamaha						16							0
	(Poland) Andrzej Chmielewski	Suzuki							16						0
	(Italy) Gabriele Poma	Yamaha	20	26	21	Ret	C	18	17	18	19	18	20	19	0
	(United Kingdom) Jay Dunn	Suzuki	WD												0
	(United Kingdom) Jay Dunn	Honda							22	21	20	17	25	25	0
	(Belgium) Nicolas Pirot	Yamaha	Ret	18	Ret	Ret		Ret	26	24	23	Ret	29	22	0
	(Italy) Ashley Carlucci	Kawasaki	21	WD											0
	(Spain) Alex Cortes	Yamaha		21											0
	(Austria) Stefan Kerschbaumer	Honda							23						0
	(Australia) Ryan Taylor	Kawasaki	Ret	28	30	Ret	C	26	31	23	26	Ret	30	27	0
	(Bulgaria) Radostin Todorov	Yamaha	28	27		25	C	WD	DNS	WD	WD	WD	WD	WD	0
	(South Africa) Ronan Quarmby	Suzuki					C								0
	(South Africa) Ronan Quarmby	Kawasaki						25	WD						0
	(Slovakia) Tomáš Svitok	Kawasaki						27	29						0
	(Poland) Mateusz Stoklosa	Yamaha							28						0
	(Netherlands) Mark Ten Napel	Yamaha			29										0
	(Netherlands) Nigel Walraven	Suzuki							32						0
	(Spain) Eric Morillas	Yamaha		Ret											0
	(Germany) Kevin Wahr	Yamaha										DSQ			0
	(Switzerland) Christian Von Gunten	Suzuki										DNS			
	(United Kingdom) Daniel Brill	Suzuki	WD	WD											
Pos	Rider	Bike	DON (Europe)	VAL (Spain)	ASS (Netherlands)	MNZ (Italy)	SIL (United Kingdom)	MIS (San Marino)	BRN (Czech Republic)	BRA (United Kingdom)		LAU (Germany)	VAL (Italy)	MAG (France)	Pts

Colour	Result
Gold	Winner
Silver	Second place
Bronze	Third place
Green	Points classification
Blue	Non-points classification
Blue	Non-classified finish (NC)
Purple	Retired, not classified (Ret)
Red	Did not qualify (DNQ)
Red	Did not pre-qualify (DNPQ)
Black	Disqualified (DSQ)
White	Did not start (DNS)
White	Withdrew (WD)
White	Race cancelled (C)
Blank	Did not practice (DNP)
Blank	Did not arrive (DNA)
Blank	Excluded (EX)

**Bold** – Pole position
Italics – Fastest lap
Source :
