= 2006 European Superstock 600 Championship =

Motorcycle racing series

2006 European Superstock 600 Championship
Previous:	2005	Next:	2007
Support series: Superbike World Championship; Supersport World Championship; FIM Superstock 1000 Cup

The 2006 European Superstock 600 Championship was the second season of the European Superstock 600 Championship. The season was contested over ten races, beginning at Circuit Ricardo Tormo on 22 April and ending at Circuit de Nevers Magny-Cours on 8 October. Xavier Simeon clinched the title after beating closest rival Niccolò Canepa.

== Race calendar and results ==
2006 calendar
Round	Date	Round	Circuit	Pole position	Fastest lap	Race winner	Winning team
1	22 April	Spain	Circuit Ricardo Tormo	(Belgium) Xavier Simeon	(Belgium) Xavier Simeon	(Belgium) Xavier Simeon	Alstare Suzuki Corona Extra
2	6 May	Italy	Autodromo Nazionale Monza	(Italy) Niccolò Canepa	(Belgium) Xavier Simeon	(Belgium) Xavier Simeon	Alstare Suzuki Corona Extra
3	28 May	Europe	Silverstone Circuit	(Italy) Niccolò Canepa	(Belgium) Xavier Simeon	(Italy) Niccolò Canepa	Ducati Xerox Junior
4	24 June	San Marino	Misano Adriatico	(Italy) Niccolò Canepa	(Italy) Davide Giugliano	(Italy) Davide Giugliano	Lightspeed Kawasaki Supported
5	22 July	Czech Republic	Brno Circuit	(Belgium) Xavier Simeon	(Italy) Niccolò Canepa	(Belgium) Xavier Simeon	Alstare Suzuki Corona Extra
6	6 August	(United Kingdom) Great Britain	Brands Hatch	(Italy) Niccolò Canepa	(Italy) Niccolò Canepa	(Belgium) Xavier Simeon	Alstare Suzuki Corona Extra
7	3 September	Netherlands	TT Circuit Assen	(Italy) Niccolò Canepa	(Italy) Niccolò Canepa	(Italy) Niccolò Canepa	Ducati Xerox Junior
8	10 September	Germany	Lausitzring	(Italy) Niccolò Canepa	(Italy) Niccolò Canepa	(Italy) Niccolò Canepa	Ducati Xerox Junior
9	1 October	Italy	Autodromo Enzo e Dino Ferrari	(Belgium) Xavier Simeon	(Belgium) Xavier Simeon	(Italy) Davide Giugliano	Lightspeed Kawasaki Supported
10	8 October	France	Circuit de Nevers Magny-Cours	(Belgium) Xavier Simeon	(Italy) Davide Giugliano	(Belgium) Xavier Simeon	Alstare Suzuki Corona Extra

== Entry list ==
Team	Constructor	Motorcycle	No.	Rider	Rounds
Ducati Xerox Junior	Ducati	Ducati 749R	59	(Italy) Niccolò Canepa	1–8
Ducati Xerox Junior	Ducati	Ducati 749R	89	(Italy) Domenico Colucci	All
Intermoto Czech Klaffi	Honda	Honda CBR600RR	20	(Czech Republic) Jan Prudik	1–5
Intermoto Czech Klaffi	Honda	Honda CBR600RR	25	(Czech Republic) Patrik Vostárek	5
Intermoto Czech Klaffi	Honda	Honda CBR600RR	25	(Czech Republic) Patrik Vostárek	6–10
Junior Team Italia Honda	Honda	Honda CBR600RR	7	(Italy) Renato Costantini	All
Junior Team Italia Honda	Honda	Honda CBR600RR	8	(Italy) Andrea Antonelli	All
MS Racing	Honda	Honda CBR600RR	77	(United Kingdom) Barry Burrell	All
Peko Racing Team	Honda	Honda CBR600RR	56	(Switzerland) Daniel Sutter	All
Stiggy Motorsports	Honda	Honda CBR600RR	34	(Sweden) Alexander Lundh	All
Vazy Racing Team	Honda	Honda CBR600RR	199	(United Kingdom) Gregg Black	1–9
Berry Racing Team	Kawasaki	Kawasaki ZX-6R	71	(Italy) Ricky Parker	9
Conti Racing Team Italia	Kawasaki	Kawasaki ZX-6R	15	(France) Kevin Galdes	9
Gold Fren Team Erinac	Kawasaki	Kawasaki ZX-6R	69	(Czech Republic) Ondřej Ježek	All
Lightspeed Kawasaki Supported	Kawasaki	Kawasaki ZX-6R	10	(Italy) Davide Giugliano	All
MNR	Kawasaki	Kawasaki ZX-6R	61	(United Kingdom) Matthew Norman	6
Pajic-Kawasaki RT	Kawasaki	Kawasaki ZX-6R	35	(Netherlands) Ronald Ter Braake	3, 7
Pajic-Kawasaki RT	Kawasaki	Kawasaki ZX-6R	42	(Netherlands) Sam Van Rens	7
PSG-1 Kawasaki Corse J.	Kawasaki	Kawasaki ZX-6R	12	(Italy) Davide Caldart	2–10
PSG-1 Kawasaki Corse J.	Kawasaki	Kawasaki ZX-6R	33	(Italy) Alessandro Colatosti	1–7
PSG-1 Kawasaki Corse J.	Kawasaki	Kawasaki ZX-6R	45	(Italy) Daniele Rossi	9–10
Alstare Suzuki Corona Extra	Suzuki	Suzuki GSX-R600R	19	(Belgium) Xavier Simeon	All
Amici Racing Team	Suzuki	Suzuki GSX-R600R	43	(Netherlands) Nigel Walraven	7
Backlund Racing	Suzuki	Suzuki GSX-R600R	29	(Sweden) Filip Backlund	5
Celani Suzuki Italia	Suzuki	Suzuki GSX-R600R	38	(Italy) Marco Bussolotti	4
Colosio Racing	Suzuki	Suzuki GSX-R600R	36	(Italy) Jarno Colosio	9
DBG Racing	Suzuki	Suzuki GSX-R600R	24	(Italy) Daniele Beretta	All
Mist Suzuki	Suzuki	Suzuki GSX-R600R	16	(United Kingdom) Christopher Northover	All
Mist Suzuki	Suzuki	Suzuki GSX-R600R	18	(United Kingdom) Matt Bond	All
Nonsolomoto - Biassono	Suzuki	Suzuki GSX-R600R	36	(Italy) Jarno Colosio	2
Remar Racing Holland	Suzuki	Suzuki GSX-R600R	96	(Netherlands) Marcel Van Nieuwenhuizen	1–4
RG Team	Suzuki	Suzuki GSX-R600R	32	(Italy) Robert Gianfardoni	4–6
Some Racing	Suzuki	Suzuki GSX-R600R	31	(Netherlands) Lennart Van Houwelingen	All
SRC Racing Team	Suzuki	Suzuki GSX-R600R	55	(Belgium) Vincent Lonbois	All
TKR Suzuki Switzerland	Suzuki	Suzuki GSX-R600R	41	(Switzerland) Gregory Junod	All
44 Racing Team	Yamaha	Yamaha YZF-R6	36	(Italy) Jarno Colosio	10
44 Racing Team	Yamaha	Yamaha YZF-R6	44	(Italy) Cristiano Erbacci	1, 3–9
ASPI Lussiana	Yamaha	Yamaha YZF-R6	52	(France) Mathieu Lussiana	10
Beowulf Motorsport	Yamaha	Yamaha YZF-R6	46	(United Kingdom) Leon Hunt	7–10
Bevilacqua Corse	Yamaha	Yamaha YZF-R6	40	(Italy) Michele Magnoni	9
Berclaz Racing Team	Yamaha	Yamaha YZF-R6	58	(Switzerland) Gabriel Berclaz	2, 4–6, 9–10
Hodt As Racing	Yamaha	Yamaha YZF-R6	88	(Norway) Mads Odin Hodt	All
Holiday Gym	Yamaha	Yamaha YZF-R6	28	(Spain) Yannick Guerra	2–10
Inotherm Racing Team	Yamaha	Yamaha YZF-R6	84	(Slovenia) Boštjan Pintar	1–5, 7–10
Lian Products Racing Team	Yamaha	Yamaha YZF-R6	99	(Netherlands) Roy Ten Napel	All
Millet Racing Yamaha Jr; Millet Racing Yamaha 2	Yamaha	Yamaha YZF-R6	21	(France) Franck Millet	All
Millet Racing Yamaha Jr; Millet Racing Yamaha 2	Yamaha	Yamaha YZF-R6	30	(Switzerland) Michaël Savary	All
Millet Racing Yamaha Jr; Millet Racing Yamaha 2	Yamaha	Yamaha YZF-R6	75	(Germany) Dennis Sigloch	9–10
Millet Racing Yamaha Jr; Millet Racing Yamaha 2	Yamaha	Yamaha YZF-R6	79	(Brazil) Luiz Carlos	1–6
Moto 1	Yamaha	Yamaha YZF-R6	11	(Italy) Leonardo Pedoni	4
Moto 1	Yamaha	Yamaha YZF-R6	14	(France) Mathieu Gines	1–2
Moto 1	Yamaha	Yamaha YZF-R6	74	(France) Sylvain Barrier	5–10
Moto Performance	Yamaha	Yamaha YZF-R6	51	(France) Julien Millet	10
MRC Racing	Yamaha	Yamaha YZF-R6	39	(Italy) Raffaele Filice	4
Peko Racing Team	Yamaha	Yamaha YZF-R6	75	(Germany) Dennis Sigloch	8
Probikes Motorsport	Yamaha	Yamaha YZF-R6	96	(Netherlands) Marcel Van Nieuwenhuizen	7
Promoracing	Yamaha	Yamaha YZF-R6	23	(Spain) Josep Pedro	1
Promoracing	Yamaha	Yamaha YZF-R6	27	(Spain) Francesc Gamell	1
RG Team	Yamaha	Yamaha YZF-R6	32	(Italy) Robert Gianfardoni	1–3
RG Team	Yamaha	Yamaha YZF-R6	49	(Italy) Davide Bastianelli	8–10
Sam Bishop Racing	Yamaha	Yamaha YZF-R6	60	(United Kingdom) Sam Bishop	6
SBP Racing Galvin	Yamaha	Yamaha YZF-R6	196	(Italy) Jonathan Gallina	1
Steve Smith Racing	Yamaha	Yamaha YZF-R6	62	(United Kingdom) Steve Smith	6
Team Laglisse	Yamaha	Yamaha YZF-R6	22	(Spain) Santiago Barragán	1
Team Laglisse	Yamaha	Yamaha YZF-R6	28	(Spain) Yannick Guerra	1
Team Trasimeno; Trasimeno Junior Team	Yamaha	Yamaha YZF-R6	26	(United States) Will Gruy	All
Team Trasimeno; Trasimeno Junior Team	Yamaha	Yamaha YZF-R6	37	(Poland) Andrzej Chmielewski	All
Team Trasimeno; Trasimeno Junior Team	Yamaha	Yamaha YZF-R6	47	(Italy) Eddi La Marra	1–5, 9–10
Team Trasimeno; Trasimeno Junior Team	Yamaha	Yamaha YZF-R6	63	(Italy) Patrizio Valsecchi	7–8
Up Racing	Yamaha	Yamaha YZF-R6	50	(France) Jordan Pernoud	10
Walkowiak Racing	Yamaha	Yamaha YZF-R6	48	(Poland) Marcin Walkowiak	10

Key
Regular rider
Wildcard rider
Replacement rider

- All entries used Pirelli tyres.

== Championship' standings ==
=== Riders' standings ===
Pos	Rider	Bike	VAL (Spain)	MNZ (Italy)	SIL (Europe)	MIS (San Marino)	BRN (Czech Republic)	BRA (United Kingdom)	ASS (Netherlands)	LAU (Germany)	IMO (Italy)	MAG (France)	Pts
1	(Belgium) Xavier Simeon	Suzuki	**1**	1	2	2	**1**	1	2	3	**2**	**1**	221
2	(Italy) Niccolò Canepa	Ducati	2	**Ret**	**1**	**3**	2	**2**	**1**	**1**			151
3	(Italy) Davide Giugliano	Kawasaki	6	2	3	1	Ret	4	3	2	1	Ret	145
4	(Italy) Domenico Colucci	Ducati	11	6	4	7	7	Ret	7	4	9	3	91
5	(Italy) Andrea Antonelli	Honda	15	Ret	5	5	3	3	4	Ret	Ret	2	88
6	(Czech Republic) Ondřej Ježek	Kawasaki	10	10	9	11	4	6	12	6	Ret	DNS	61
7	(Switzerland) Michaël Savary	Yamaha	7	7	11	18	10	11	9	24	16	8	49
8	(Italy) Renato Costantini	Honda	24	5	6	8	Ret	5	Ret	8	Ret	WD	48
9	(Poland) Andrzej Chmielewski	Yamaha	12	14	20	15	5	17	8	9	8	9	48
10	(Italy) Daniele Beretta	Suzuki	13	11	13	6	6	9	Ret	16	6	22	48
11	(Netherlands) Roy Ten Napel	Yamaha	9	12	19	22	12	27	18	7	5	6	45
12	(France) Franck Millet	Yamaha	Ret	8	8	16	11	10	19	12	18	5	42
13	(United Kingdom) Barry Burrell	Honda	Ret	16	7	12	9	14	14	15	15	4	39
14	(Switzerland) Gregory Junod	Suzuki	18	9	10	10	DNS	12	5	20	11	Ret	39
15	(Switzerland) Daniel Sutter	Honda	8	Ret	Ret	13	8	8	13	10	25	15	37
16	(Italy) Eddi La Marra	Yamaha	16	4	17	4	Ret				20	WD	26
17	(United Kingdom) Matt Bond	Suzuki	14	17	14	33	27	7	24	18	14	10	21
18	(Italy) Alessandro Colatosti	Kawasaki	Ret	3	12	Ret	Ret	Ret	27				20
19	(Spain) Santiago Barragán	Yamaha	3										16
20	(France) Sylvain Barrier	Yamaha					17	Ret	DNS	17	3	Ret	16
21	(Norway) Mads Odin Hodt	Yamaha	Ret	Ret	23	24	16	18	Ret	13	12	7	16
22	(Spain) Josep Pedro	Yamaha	4										13
23	(Italy) Michele Magnoni	Yamaha									4		13
24	(Spain) Francesc Gamell	Yamaha	5										11
25	(Sweden) Alexander Lundh	Honda	25	Ret	22	20	DNS	19	Ret	5	19	21	11
26	(Germany) Dennis Sigloch	Yamaha								11	10	Ret	11
27	(Netherlands) Lennart Van Houwelingen	Suzuki	Ret	13	24	26	13	28	11	23	17	Ret	11
28	(Netherlands) Nigel Walraven	Suzuki							6				10
29	(Italy) Davide Bastianelli	Yamaha								Ret	7	19	9
30	(United Kingdom) Christopher Northover	Suzuki	Ret	22	15	28	19	13	Ret	21	22	11	9
31	(Slovenia) Boštjan Pintar	Yamaha	Ret	Ret	16	17	18		20	14	13	12	9
32	(Italy) Raffaele Filice	Yamaha				9							7
33	(United Kingdom) Gregg Black	Honda	17	Ret	18	25	22	Ret	10	DNS	WD		6
34	(Italy) Cristiano Erbacci	Yamaha	20		Ret	14	20	15	15	Ret	WD		4
35	(Belgium) Vincent Lonbois	Suzuki	26	24	27	31	DSQ	20	17	Ret	21	13	3
36	(Sweden) Filip Backlund	Suzuki					14						2
37	(Czech Republic) Patrik Vostárek	Honda					WD	Ret	26	26	23	14	2
38	(Italy) Jarno Colosio	Suzuki		15							Ret		1
38	(Italy) Jarno Colosio	Yamaha										Ret	1
39	(United States) Will Gruy	Yamaha	19	19	Ret	19	15	16	DNS	Ret	Ret	Ret	1
	(Netherlands) Marcel Van Nieuwenhuizen	Suzuki	Ret	18	21	WD							0
	(Netherlands) Marcel Van Nieuwenhuizen	Yamaha							16				0
	(Spain) Yannick Guerra	Yamaha	21	Ret	Ret	32	26	23	25	25	29	16	0
	(Italy) Daniele Rossi	Kawasaki									24	17	0
	(Switzerland) Gabriel Berclaz	Yamaha		DNQ		Ret	23	25			26	18	0
	(Italy) Patrizio Valsecchi	Yamaha							23	19			0
	(Italy) Davide Caldart	Kawasaki		20	Ret	29	Ret	26	DNQ	27	30	Ret	0
	(France) Jordan Pernoud	Yamaha										20	0
	(Italy) Robert Gianfardoni	Yamaha	23	21	28								0
	(Italy) Robert Gianfardoni	Suzuki				27	25	21					0
	(Italy) Marco Bussolotti	Suzuki				21							0
	(Czech Republic) Jan Prudik	Honda	22	23	25	30	21						0
	(Netherlands) Ronald Ter Braake	Kawasaki			Ret				21				0
	(United Kingdom) Sam Bishop	Yamaha						22					0
	(United Kingdom) Leon Hunt	Yamaha							22	22	27	WD	0
	(Brazil) Luiz Carlos	Yamaha	DNS	WD	26	23	DNS	DNS					0
	(United Kingdom) Matthew Norman	Kawasaki						24					0
	(Netherlands) Sam Van Rens	Kawasaki							28				0
	(Italy) Ricky Parker	Kawasaki									28		0
	(Italy) Jonathan Gallina	Yamaha	Ret										0
	(France) Mathieu Gines	Yamaha	Ret	DNS									0
	(Italy) Leonardo Pedoni	Yamaha				Ret							0
	(United Kingdom) Steve Smith	Yamaha						Ret					0
	(France) Kevin Galdes	Kawasaki									Ret		0
	(France) Julien Millet	Yamaha										Ret	0
	(France) Mathieu Lussiana	Yamaha										Ret	0
	(Poland) Marcin Walkowiak	Yamaha										Ret	0
Pos	Rider	Bike	VAL (Spain)	MNZ (Italy)	SIL (Europe)	MIS (San Marino)	BRN (Czech Republic)	BRA (United Kingdom)	ASS (Netherlands)	LAU (Germany)	IMO (Italy)	MAG (France)	Pts

Colour	Result
Gold	Winner
Silver	Second place
Bronze	Third place
Green	Points classification
Blue	Non-points classification
Blue	Non-classified finish (NC)
Purple	Retired, not classified (Ret)
Red	Did not qualify (DNQ)
Red	Did not pre-qualify (DNPQ)
Black	Disqualified (DSQ)
White	Did not start (DNS)
White	Withdrew (WD)
White	Race cancelled (C)
Blank	Did not practice (DNP)
Blank	Did not arrive (DNA)
Blank	Excluded (EX)

**Bold** – Pole position
Italics – Fastest lap
Source :
