= Davide Giugliano =

Italian motorcycle racer (born 1989)

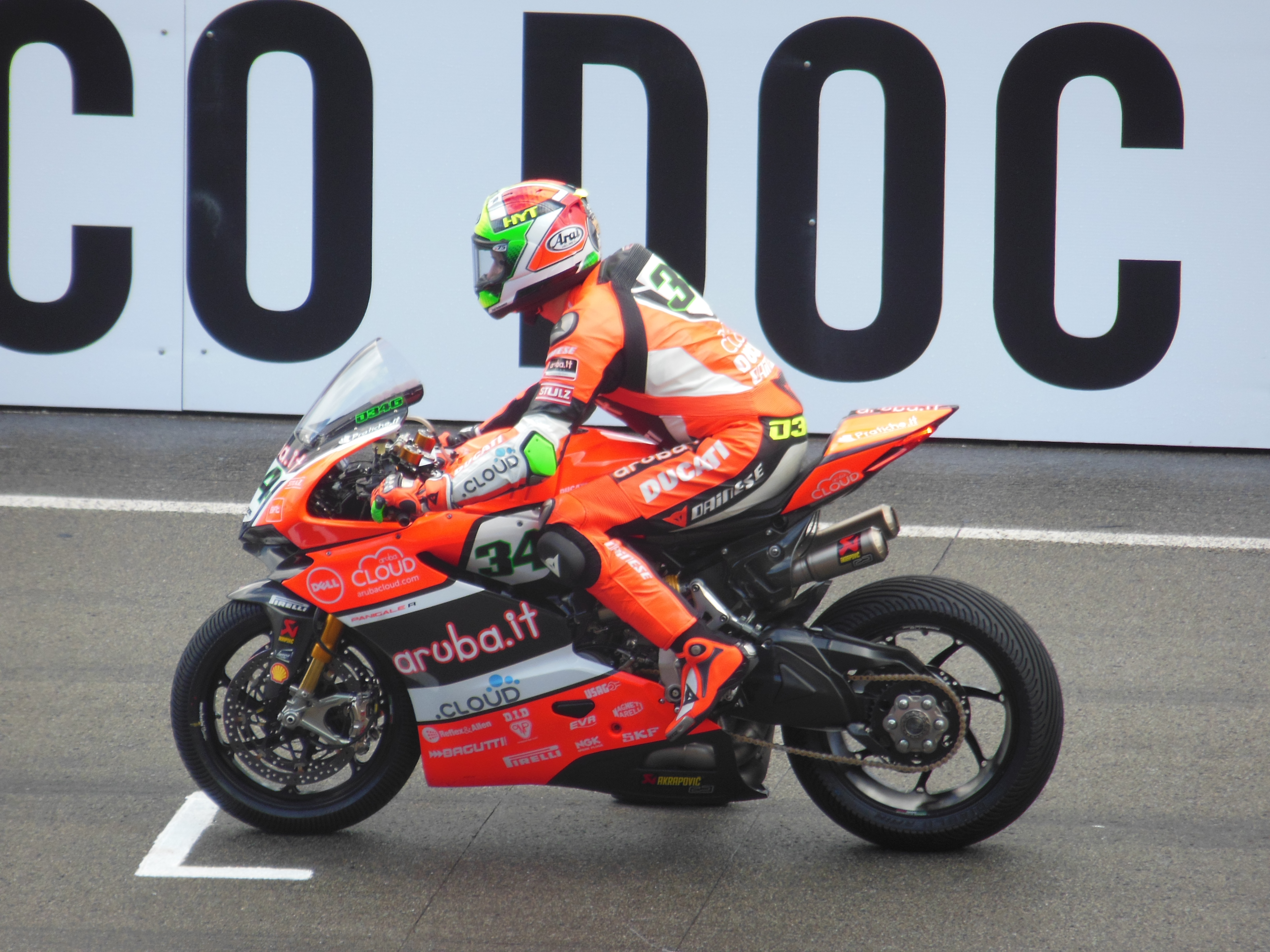
- Giugliano in 2016
- Nationality: Italian
- Born: 28 October 1989 (age 37); Rome, Italy
Motorcycle racing career statistics
Superbike World Championship
Active years	2011–2018
Manufacturers	Ducati, Aprilia, Honda
Championships	0
2018 championship position	21st (11 pts)
Starts / Wins / Podiums / Poles / F. laps / Points; 124 / 0 / 14 / 5 / 8 / 879
Supersport World Championship
Active years	2007
Manufacturers	Kawasaki
Championships	0
2007 championship position	27th (21 pts)
Starts / Wins / Podiums / Poles / F. laps / Points; 8 / 0 / 0 / 0 / 0 / 21

Davide Giugliano (born 28 October 1989) is an Italian motorcycle racer. He won the FIM Superstock 1000 Cup in 2011.

== Career ==
In 2005, Giugliano made his debut in Superstock 600 and in 2007 he moved to Supersport riding a Kawasaki ZX-6R. From 2008 to 2011, he had competed in FIM Superstock 1000 Cup, winning the championship in 2011 season with a Ducati 1098R. From 2012 to 2016, he was a regular rider in the Superbike World Championship.

For 2017, Giugliano started the season in the British Superbike Championship, riding a BMW S1000RR for Tyco BMW Motorrad Racing; he and the team split after an injury sustained in the second round.

== Career statistics ==
=== European Superstock 600 ===
==== Races by year ====
(key) (Races in bold indicate pole position, races in italics indicate fastest lap)

Year	Bike	1	2	3	4	5	6	7	8	9	10	Pos	Pts
2005	Honda	VAL	MNZ	SIL	MIS	BRN	BRA	ASS	LAU	IMO; DSQ	MAG	NC	0
2006	Kawasaki	VAL; 6	MNZ; 2	SIL; 3	MIS; 1	BRN; Ret	BRA; 4	ASS; 3	LAU; 2	IMO; 1	MAG; Ret	3rd	145

=== FIM Superstock 1000 Cup ===
==== Races by year ====
(key) (Races in bold indicate pole position) (Races in italics indicate fastest lap)

Year	Bike	1	2	3	4	5	6	7	8	9	10	Pos	Pts
2008	Suzuki	VAL; 2	NED; 8	MNZ; Ret	NŰR; 2	SMR; 20	BRN; 9	BRA; Ret	DON; 3	MAG; 15	ALG; Ret	7th	72
2009	MV Agusta	**VAL**; Ret	NED; 8	MNZ; Ret	SMR; 6	DON; 16						10th	43
2009	Suzuki						BRN; 9	NUR; 4	IMO; Ret			10th	43
2009	Yamaha									MAG; 11	ALG	10th	43
2010	Suzuki	ALG; 7	VAL; 2	NED; 3	MNZ; 17	SMR; 8	BRN; Ret	SIL; 7	NŰR; 7	IMO; 4	MAG; 6	5th	94
2011	Ducati	NED; 1	**MNZ**; 2	SMR; 1	ARA; 1	BRN; 2	SIL; Ret	**NŰR**; 1	**IMO**; 2	MAG; 5	ALG	1st	171

=== Supersport World Championship ===
==== Races by year ====
(key) (Races in bold indicate pole position, races in italics indicate fastest lap)

Year	Bike	1	2	3	4	5	6	7	8	9	10	11	12	13	Pos	Pts
2007	Kawasaki	QAT; 20	AUS; Ret	EUR; 6	SPA; 12	NED; 9	ITA; DNS	GBR; Ret	SMR; Ret	CZE; 20	GBR	GER	ITA	FRA	27th	21

=== Superbike World Championship ===
==== Races by year ====
(key) (Races in bold indicate pole position, races in italics indicate fastest lap)

Year	Bike	1		2		3		4		5		6		7		8		9		10		11		12		13		14		Pos	Pts
Year	Bike	R1	R2	R1	R2	R1	R2	R1	R2	R1	R2	R1	R2	R1	R2	R1	R2	R1	R2	R1	R2	R1	R2	R1	R2	R1	R2	R1	R2	Pos	Pts
2011	Ducati	AUS	AUS	EUR	EUR	NED	NED	ITA	ITA	USA	USA	SMR	SMR	SPA	SPA	CZE	CZE	GBR	GBR	GER	GER	ITA	ITA	FRA	FRA	POR; 16	POR; 12			28th	4
2012	Ducati	AUS; 9	AUS; 13	ITA; Ret	ITA; Ret	NED; 2	NED; 9	ITA; C	ITA; 8	EUR; 7	EUR; Ret	USA; 11	USA; 7	SMR; 3	SMR; Ret	SPA; 8	SPA; 10	CZE; Ret	CZE; 11	GBR; 9	GBR; Ret	RUS; Ret	RUS; 6	GER; Ret	GER; 7	POR; Ret	POR; NC	FRA; 8	FRA; 6	10th	143
2013	Aprilia	AUS; Ret	AUS; 6	SPA; Ret	SPA; 4	NED; 6	NED; Ret	ITA; 10	ITA; 6	GBR; 6	GBR; 4	POR; Ret	POR; 9	ITA; 2	ITA; Ret	**RUS**; Ret	**RUS**; C	GBR; Ret	GBR; 15	GER; 5	GER; 6	TUR; 5	TUR; 9	USA; 6	USA; 2	FRA; 4	FRA; 4	SPA; 6	SPA; 10	6th	211
2014	Ducati	AUS; 4	AUS; 4	SPA; 8	SPA; 7	NED; Ret	NED; 3	ITA; Ret	ITA; 6	**GBR**; Ret	**GBR**; 4	MAL; 8	MAL; 10	ITA; 8	ITA; 9	POR; 7	POR; 2	USA; 4	USA; Ret	SPA; Ret	SPA; Ret	FRA; 7	FRA; Ret	**QAT**; 5	**QAT**; 8					8th	181
2015	Ducati	AUS	AUS	THA	THA	SPA	SPA	NED	NED	**ITA**; 3	**ITA**; 4	GBR; 17	GBR; 5	**POR**; 4	**POR**; 2	ITA; 4	ITA; 2	USA; 4	USA; Ret	MAL	MAL	SPA	SPA	FRA	FRA	QAT	QAT			11th	119
2016	Ducati	AUS; 4	AUS; 3	THA; 18	THA; 10	SPA; 5	SPA; 6	NED; Ret	NED; 8	ITA; 5	ITA; 4	MAL; 6	MAL; 2	GBR; 2	GBR; 7	ITA; 14	ITA; 3	USA; Ret	USA; 2	GER; 7	GER; Ret	FRA; DNS	FRA; DNS	SPA; Ret	SPA; 13	QAT; Ret	QAT; DNS			7th	197
2017	Honda	AUS	AUS	THA	THA	SPA	SPA	NED	NED	ITA	ITA	GBR	GBR	ITA	ITA	USA	USA	GER; Ret	GER; 17	POR	POR	FRA; 8	FRA; 11	SPA; Ret	SPA; 17	QAT; Ret	QAT; DNS			26th	13
2018	Aprilia	AUS	AUS	THA	THA	SPA; 13	SPA; 18	NED; 13	NED; 11	ITA	ITA	GBR	GBR	CZE	CZE	USA	USA	ITA	ITA	POR	POR	FRA	FRA	ARG	ARG	QAT	QAT			21st	11

=== British Superbike Championship ===
Year	Make	1		2		3		4		5		6		7		8		9			10		11		12			Pos	Pts
Year	Make	R1	R2	R1	R2	R1	R2	R1	R2	R1	R2	R1	R2	R1	R2	R1	R2	R1	R2	R3	R1	R2	R1	R2	R1	R2	R3	Pos	Pts
2017	BMW	DON; 13	DON; 9	BHI; DNS	BHI; DNS	OUL	OUL	KNO	KNO	SNE	SNE	BHGP	BHGP	THR	THR	CAD	CAD	SIL	SIL	SIL	OUL	OUL	ASS	ASS	BHGP	BHGP	BHGP	24th	10
