= Andrea Antonelli =

Italian motorcycle racer

- Nationality: Italian
- Born: 17 January 1988; Castiglione del Lago, Italy
- Died: 21 July 2013 (aged 25); Volokolamsky District, Russia
Motorcycle racing career statistics
Supersport World Championship
Active years	2012-2013
Manufacturers	Honda; Yamaha; Kawasaki
2013 championship position	11th
Starts / Wins / Podiums / Poles / F. laps / Points; 22 / 0 / 0 / 0 / 0 / 115

Andrea Antonelli (17 January 1988 – 21 July 2013) was an Italian motorcycle racer. He was killed in an accident at the Moscow Raceway, whilst competing for Team Go Eleven Kawasaki in the Supersport World Championship.

== Career ==
Antonelli, born in Castiglione del Lago, Italy, first raced in the Italian 125cc Championship, becoming the second youngest ever race winner behind Marco Melandri. He then moved onto the European Superstock 600 Championship in 2005, becoming runner up to Maxime Berger in 2007. He next stepped up to the Superstock 1000 Championship with the Lorini Honda team, where he spent four seasons, peaking with fourth overall in 2010. He and Lorini moved into the Supersport World Championship for 2012, but left the team to join Bike Service Yamaha midseason, finishing the season tenth overall, and moved again to Team Go Eleven Kawasaki for 2013. Both he and the team took their best ever results early in the season, including a fourth-place finish at Motorland Aragón, and a fourth place start at Moscow Raceway.

== Death ==
Antonelli died in a crash on 21 July 2013 at the Moscow Raceway during a 2013 Supersport World Championship season race. He fell on the back straight in the rain and was hit by fellow Italian Lorenzo Zanetti's Honda. He suffered head trauma and later succumbed to his injuries. As a result of the accident, the remaining races of the weekend were cancelled.

== Career statistics ==
- 2005 - 6th, European Superstock 600 Championship, Honda CBR600RR
- 2006 - 5th, European Superstock 600 Championship, Honda CBR600RR
- 2007 - 2nd, European Superstock 600 Championship, Honda CBR600RR
- 2008 - 10th, FIM Superstock 1000 Cup, Honda, Yamaha YZF-R1
- 2009 - 13th, FIM Superstock 1000 Cup, Yamaha YZF-R1
- 2010 - 4th, FIM Superstock 1000 Cup, Honda CBR1000RR
- 2011 - 6th, FIM Superstock 1000 Cup, Honda CBR1000RR
- To see the Formula 1 racer also named “Andrea,” go back to top and click on “Kimi Antonelli.”

=== CIV Championship (Campionato Italiano Velocita) ===
==== Races by year ====
(key) (Races in bold indicate pole position; races in italics indicate fastest lap)

Year	Class	Bike	1	2	3	4	5	Pos	Pts
2003	125cc	Honda	MIS1; 14	MUG1; 13	MIS1; 11	MUG2; 19	VAL; Ret	19th	10
2004	125cc	Aprilia	MUG; 8	IMO; 6	VAL1; 11	MIS; 17	VAL2; 9	9th	30

=== European Superstock 600 ===
==== Races by year ====
(key) (Races in bold indicate pole position, races in italics indicate fastest lap)

Year	Bike	1	2	3	4	5	6	7	8	9	10	11	12	Pos	Pts
2005	Kawasaki	VAL; Ret	MNZ; DNS	SIL; 5	MIS; 4	BRN; Ret	BRA; 5	ASS; 3	LAU; 4	IMO; 3	MAG; 5			6th	90
2006	Honda	VAL; 15	MNZ; Ret	SIL; 5	MIS; 5	BRN; 3	BRA; 3	ASS; 4	LAU; Ret	IMO; Ret	MAG; 2			5th	88
2007	Honda	DON; 2	SPA; 9	ASS; 1	MNZ; 7	SIL; C	MIS; 5	BRN; 5	BRA; 4	BRA; 2	LAU; 10	VAL; 2	MAG; 2	2nd	162

=== FIM Superstock 1000 Cup ===
==== Races by year ====
(key) (Races in bold indicate pole position) (Races in italics indicate fastest lap)

Year	Bike	1	2	3	4	5	6	7	8	9	10	Pos	Pts
2008	Honda/Yamaha	VAL; 20	NED; 5	MNZ; 12	NŰR; 13	SMR; 6	BRN; 4	BRA; 3	DON; Ret	MAG; 18	ALG; DSQ	10th	57
2009	Yamaha	VAL; 10	NED; 12	MNZ; Ret	SMR; 14	DON; 25	BRN; Ret	NŰR; 7	IMO; Ret	MAG; Ret	ALG; 12	13th	25
2010	Honda	ALG; 8	VAL; 6	NED; 6	MNZ; Ret	SMR; 4	BRN; 3	SIL; 3	NŰR; 3	IMO; Ret	MAG; 7	4th	98
2011	Honda	NED; 6	MNZ; 8	SMR; Ret	ARA; 6	BRN; 9	SIL; 7	NŰR; 7	IMO; 11	MAG; 7	ALG; 6	6th	77

=== Supersport World Championship ===
==== Races by year ====
Year	Bike	1	2	3	4	5	6	7	8	9	10	11	12	13	Pos.	Pts
2008	Honda	QAT; Ret	AUS; Ret	SPA	NED	ITA	GER	SMR	CZE	GBR	EUR	ITA	FRA	POR	NC	0
2012	Honda	AUS; 16	ITA; 8	NED; 7	ITA; 8	EUR; 22									10th	60
2012	Yamaha						SMR; 10	SPA; Ret	CZE; Ret	GBR; 9	RUS; 7	GER; 14	POR; 13	FRA; 8	10th	60
2013	Kawasaki	AUS; 7	SPA; 4	NED; 9	ITA; Ret	GBR; 8	POR; 7	ITA; 7	RUS; C	GBR	GER	TUR	FRA	SPA	11th	55
