= Sylvain Barrier =

French motorcycle racer (born 1988)

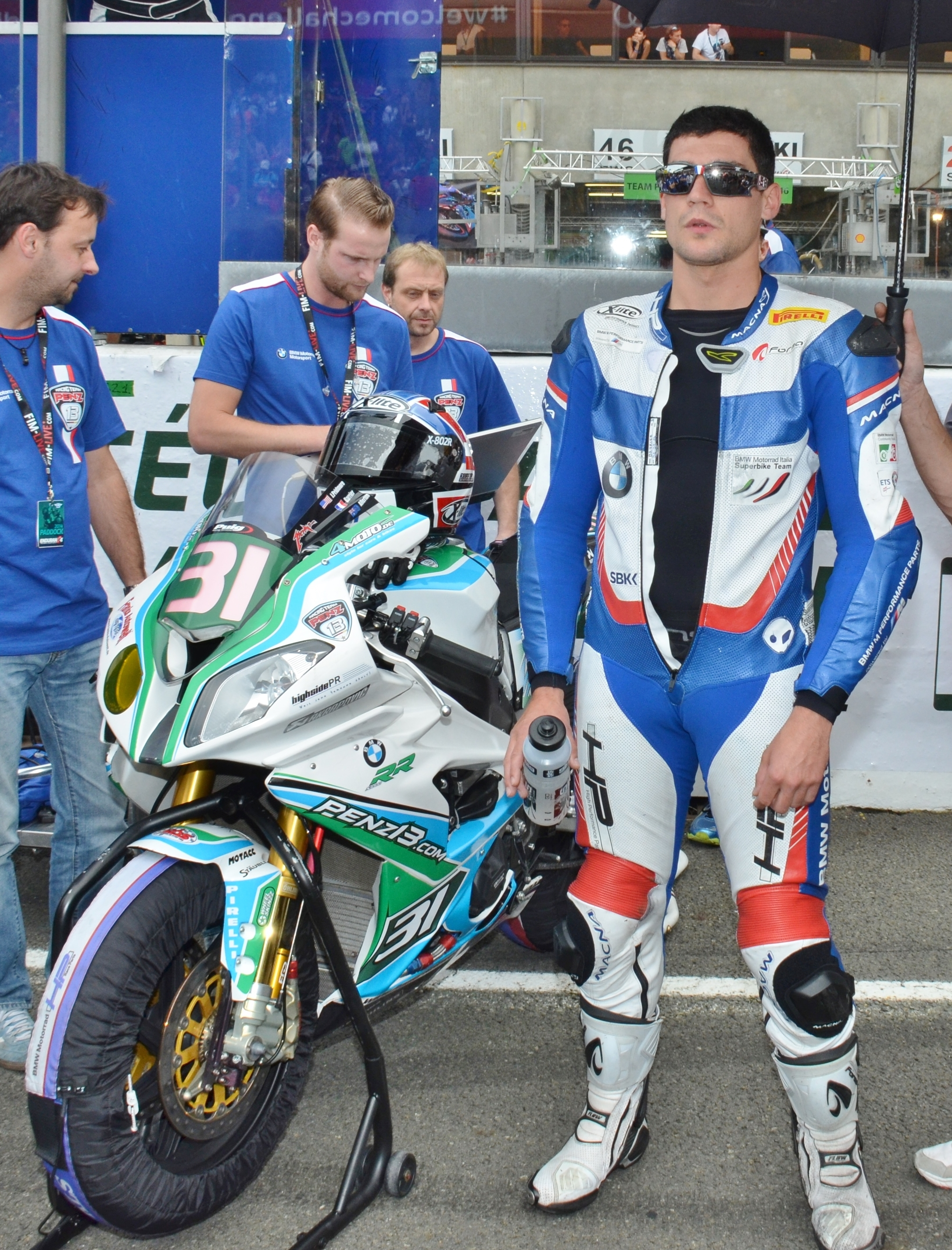
- Barrier in 2014
- Nationality: French
- Born: 20 October 1988 (age 38); Oyonnax, France
- Current team: Brixx Performance
- Bike number: 20
Motorcycle racing career statistics
Superbike World Championship
Active years	2013–2016, 2019–2020
Manufacturers	BMW, Kawasaki, Ducati
Championships	0
2020 championship position	20th (12 pts)
Starts / Wins / Podiums / Poles / F. laps / Points; 47 / 0 / 0 / 0 / 0 / 74

Sylvain Barrier (born 20 October 1988) is a French motorcycle racer. He has won the FIM Superstock 1000 Cup twice, winning the title in 2012, and again in 2013.

== Career ==
Barrier has raced in the FIM Superstock 1000 Cup since 2008, mostly in a BMW machinery finishing sixth in 2010 with two podiums, fourth in 2011 with a one win and four podiums, and champion in 2012 and 2013, he previously raced in the European Superstock 600 championship in 2006 and 2007. In his first season in the FIM Superstock 1000 Championship in 2008, he finished 16th, and in 2009, he finished fifth both years aboard a Yamaha. He made his Superbike World Championship debut in the Jerez circuit finishing 12th in Race 1, and 13th in Race 2, scoring seven points during the weekend, however also turned the last race for the BMW factory team, as BMW Motorrad announced his withdrawal as an official team in July.

In 2018, Barrier competed in the British Superbike Championship aboard a BMW S1000RR.

== Career statistics ==
=== Career highlights ===
- 2006 - 20th, European Superstock 600 Championship, Yamaha YZF-R6
- 2007 - 6th, European Superstock 600 Championship, Yamaha YZF-R6
- 2008 - 16th, FIM Superstock 1000 Cup, Yamaha YZF-R1
- 2009 - 5th, FIM Superstock 1000 Cup, Yamaha YZF-R1
- 2010 - 6th, FIM Superstock 1000 Cup, BMW
- 2011 - 4th, FIM Superstock 1000 Cup, BMW
- 2012 - 1st, FIM Superstock 1000 Cup, BMW S1000RR
- 2013 - 1st, FIM Superstock 1000 Cup, BMW S1000RR
- 2015 - 15th, FIM Superstock 1000 Cup, Yamaha YZF-R1

=== European Superstock 600 ===
==== Races by year ====
(key) (Races in bold indicate pole position, races in italics indicate fastest lap)

Year	Bike	1	2	3	4	5	6	7	8	9	10	11	12	Pos	Pts
2006	Yamaha	VAL	MNZ	SIL	MIS	BRN; 17	BRA; Ret	ASS; DNS	LAU; 17	IMO; 3	MAG; Ret			20th	16
2007	Yamaha	DON; 4	SPA; Ret	ASS; 2	MNZ; 4	SIL; C	MIS; Ret	BRN; 2	BRA; 6	BRA; Ret	LAU; Ret	VAL; 7	MAG; 6	6th	95

=== FIM Superstock 1000 Cup ===
==== Races by year ====
(key) (Races in bold indicate pole position) (Races in italics indicate fastest lap)

Year	Bike	1	2	3	4	5	6	7	8	9	10	Pos	Pts
2008	Yamaha	VAL; 14	NED; Ret	MNZ; Ret	NŰR; Ret	SMR; 14	BRN; DNS	BRA	DON	MAG; 7	ALG; 7	16th	22
2009	Yamaha	VAL; Ret	NED; 3	MNZ; 5	SMR; 3	DON; 5	BRN; 4	NŰR; Ret	IMO; 16	MAG; 3	ALG; 7	5th	92
2010	BMW	ALG; 4	VAL; 3	NED; 5	MNZ; Ret	SMR; 9	BRN; Ret	SIL; Ret	NŰR; 4	IMO; 5	MAG; 3	6th	87
2011	BMW	NED; 3	MNZ; DNS	SMR; 4	ARA; 5	BRN; 1	SIL; Ret	NŰR; 2	IMO; 5	MAG; 3	ALG; 2	4th	132
2012	BMW	IMO; 1	NED; 1	MNZ; Ret	SMR; 1	ARA; Ret	BRN; Ret	SIL; 4	NŰR; 1	ALG; 2	MAG; 2	1st	153
2013	BMW	ARA; 1	NED; 2	MNZ; DNS	ALG; 1	IMO; 1	SIL; 1	SIL; 1	NŰR; 2	MAG; 4	JER	1st	178
2015	Yamaha	ARA; 11	NED; Ret	IMO; 10	DON; 19	ALG; 10	MIS; Ret	JER	MAG			15th	17

=== British Superbike Championship ===
(key) (Races in bold indicate pole position; races in italics indicate fastest lap)

Year	Make	1		2		3			4		5		6			7		8			9			10		11		12			Pos	Pts
Year	Make	R1	R2	R1	R2	R1	R2	R3	R1	R2	R1	R2	R1	R2	R3	R1	R2	R1	R2	R3	R1	R2	R3	R1	R2	R1	R2	R1	R2	R3	Pos	Pts
2018	BMW	DON; 19	DON; 17	BHI; 20	BHI; 19	OUL; 16	OUL; 19		SNE; 13	SNE; 14	KNO; Ret	KNO; 17	BHGP; Ret	BHGP; Ret		THR; 14	THR; 18	CAD; 18	CAD; 14		SIL; 17	SIL; 16	SIL; 15	OUL; DNS	OUL; DNS	ASS; 20	ASS; 13	BHGP; 20	BHGP; Ret	BHGP; 10	21st	19

Year	Bike	1		2		3			4		5		6		7		8		9			10		11		12			Pos	Pts
Year	Bike	R1	R2	R1	R2	R1	R2	R3	R1	R2	R1	R2	R1	R2	R1	R2	R1	R2	R1	R2	R3	R1	R2	R1	R2	R1	R2	R3	Pos	Pts
2019	Ducati	SIL; 17	SIL; 16	OUL; 17	OUL; 19	DON; 21	DON; 20	DON; Ret	BRH; 21	BRH; 19	KNO	KNO	SNE	SNE	THR	THR	CAD	CAD	OUL	OUL	OUL	ASS	ASS	DON	DON	BHGP	BHGP	BHGP	NC	0

=== Superbike World Championship ===
==== Races by year ====
(key) (Races in bold indicate pole position; races in italics indicate fastest lap)

Year	Bike	1		2		3		4		5		6		7		8		9		10		11		12		13		14		Pos	Pts
Year	Bike	R1	R2	R1	R2	R1	R2	R1	R2	R1	R2	R1	R2	R1	R2	R1	R2	R1	R2	R1	R2	R1	R2	R1	R2	R1	R2	R1	R2	Pos	Pts
2013	BMW	AUS	AUS	SPA	SPA	NED	NED	ITA	ITA	GBR	GBR	POR	POR	ITA	ITA	RUS	RUS	GBR	GBR	GER	GER	TUR	TUR	USA	USA	FRA	FRA	SPA; 12	SPA; 13	31st	7
2014	BMW	AUS	AUS	SPA	SPA	NED	NED	ITA	ITA	GBR	GBR	MAL	MAL	SMR; 15	SMR; 11	POR; 10	POR; 11	USA; 12	USA; DNS	SPA; 10	SPA; 11	FRA; 10	FRA; Ret	QAT; 14	QAT; Ret					15th	40
2015	BMW	AUS; 15	AUS; 12	THA; 14	THA; 13	SPA	SPA	NED	NED	ITA	ITA	GBR	GBR	POR	POR	SMR	SMR	USA	USA	MAL	MAL	SPA	SPA	FRA	FRA	QAT	QAT			28th	10
2016	Kawasaki	AUS; 15	AUS; 15	THA; 16	THA; 17	SPA; 16	SPA; Ret	NED	NED	ITA	ITA	MAL	MAL	GBR	GBR	ITA	ITA	USA	USA	GER	GER	FRA	FRA	SPA	SPA	QAT	QAT			32nd	2

Year	Bike	1			2			3			4			5			6			7			8			9			10			11			12			13			Pos.	Pts
Year	Bike	R1	SR	R2	R1	SR	R2	R1	SR	R2	R1	SR	R2	R1	SR	R2	R1	SR	R2	R1	SR	R2	R1	SR	R2	R1	SR	R2	R1	SR	R2	R1	SR	R2	R1	SR	R2	R1	SR	R2	Pos.	Pts
2019	Ducati	AUS	AUS	AUS	THA	THA	THA	SPA	SPA	SPA	NED	NED	NED	ITA	ITA	ITA	SPA	SPA	SPA	ITA	ITA	ITA	GBR	GBR	GBR	USA	USA	USA	POR; 17	POR; 18	POR; 18	FRA; 17	FRA; 18	FRA; 13	ARG	ARG	ARG	QAT	QAT	QAT	26th	3
2020	Ducati	AUS	AUS	AUS	SPA; 16	SPA; 21	SPA; Ret	POR; 18	POR; 16	POR; 15	SPA; 12	SPA; 18	SPA; 16	SPA; Ret	SPA; 19	SPA; Ret	SPA; 18	SPA; 15	SPA; Ret	FRA; 13	FRA; 13	FRA; 12	POR; DNS	POR; DNS	POR; DNS																20th	12
