= Daniele Rossi =

Italian motorcycle racer

- Nationality: Italian
- Born: 24 April 1987 (age 39); Seriate, Italy
Motorcycle racing career statistics
125cc World Championship
Active years	2006
Manufacturers	Honda
Starts / Wins / Podiums / Poles / F. laps / Points; 1 / 0 / 0 / 0 / 0 / 0

Daniele Rossi (born 24 April 1987) is an Italian motorcycle racer.

== Career statistics ==
2006 - NC, European Superstock 600 Championship, Kawasaki ZX-6R
2007 - NC, European Superstock 600 Championship, Honda CBR600RR

=== European Superstock 600 ===
==== Races by year ====
(key) (Races in bold indicate pole position, races in italics indicate fastest lap)

Year	Bike	1	2	3	4	5	6	7	8	9	10	11	12	Pos	Pts
2006	Kawasaki	VAL	MNZ	SIL	MIS	BRN	BRA	ASS	LAU	IMO; 24	MAG; 17			NC	0
2007	Honda	DON; 17	SPA; 16	ASS; 24	MNZ; Ret	SIL; C	MIS; 17	BRN; 20	BRA; 17	BRA; 24	LAU; Ret	VAL; 18	MAG; 24	NC	0

=== Grand Prix motorcycle racing ===
==== By season ====
Season	Class	Motorcycle	Team	Race	Win	Podium	Pole	FLap	Pts	Plcd
2006	125cc	Honda	Ticinohosting-MTR	1	0	0	0	0	0	NC
Total				**1**	**0**	**0**	**0**	**0**	**0**	

==== Races by year ====
(key)

Year	Class	Bike	1	2	3	4	5	6	7	8	9	10	11	12	13	14	15	16	Pos.	Pts
2006	125cc	Honda	SPA	QAT	TUR	CHN	FRA	ITA; 21	CAT	NED	GBR	GER	CZE	MAL	AUS	JPN	POR	VAL	NC	0
