= Patrik Vostárek =

Czech motorcycle racer

- Nationality: Czech
- Born: 3 May 1989 (age 37); Prague, Czechoslovakia
Motorcycle racing career statistics
Moto2 World Championship
Active years	2010
Manufacturers	Suter
Starts / Wins / Podiums / Poles / F. laps / Points; 1 / 0 / 0 / 0 / 0 / 0
125cc World Championship
Active years	2004–2005
Manufacturers	Honda
Starts / Wins / Podiums / Poles / F. laps / Points; 3 / 0 / 0 / 0 / 0 / 0
Supersport World Championship
Active years	2008–2009, 2011
Manufacturers	Honda
Starts / Wins / Podiums / Poles / F. laps / Points; 15 / 0 / 0 / 0 / 0 / 15

Patrik Vostárek (born 3 May 1989) is a Czech motorcycle racer who has competed in the 125cc World Championship, the European Superstock 600 Championship, the Supersport World Championship and the Moto2 World Championship. In 2011, he won the Czech Supersport Championship.

== Career statistics ==
2007 - 17th, European Superstock 600 Championship, Honda CBR600RR
2008 - 4th, European Superstock 600 Championship, Yamaha YZF-R6

=== Grand Prix motorcycle racing ===
==== By season ====
Season	Class	Motorcycle	Team	Race	Win	Podium	Pole	FLap	Pts	Plcd
2004	125cc	Honda	OMV Team Hanusch	1	0	0	0	0	0	NC
2005	125cc	Honda	Omv Team Hanusch; Hanusch Motopromotion	2	0	0	0	0	0	NC
2010	Moto2	Suter	Vector Kiefer Racing	1	0	0	0	0	0	NC
Total				**4**	**0**	**0**	**0**	**0**	**0**	

==== Races by year ====
(key)

Year	Class	Bike	1	2	3	4	5	6	7	8	9	10	11	12	13	14	15	16	17	Pos.	Pts
2004	125cc	Honda	RSA	SPA	FRA	ITA	CAT	NED	BRA	GER	GBR	CZE; 27	POR	JPN	QAT	MAL	AUS	VAL		NC	0
2005	125cc	Honda	SPA; DNQ	POR; 32	CHN	FRA	ITA	CAT	NED	GBR	GER	CZE; Ret	JPN	MAL	QAT	AUS	TUR	VAL		NC	0
2010	Moto2	Suter	QAT	SPA	FRA	ITA	GBR	NED	CAT	GER	CZE; Ret	INP	RSM	ARA	JPN	MAL	AUS	POR	VAL	NC	0

=== European Superstock 600 ===
==== Races by year ====
(key) (Races in bold indicate pole position, races in italics indicate fastest lap)

Year	Bike	1	2	3	4	5	6	7	8	9	10	11	12	Pos	Pts
2006	Honda	VAL	MNZ	SIL	MIS	BRN; WD	BRA; Ret	ASS; 26	LAU; 26	IMO; 23	MAG; 14			19th	16
2007	Honda	DON; 16	SPA; 23	ASS; 12	MNZ; 17	SIL; C	MIS; 12	BRN; 10	BRA; 16	BRA; 14	LAU; Ret	VAL; 15	MAG; 11	17th	22
2008	Honda	VAL; 11	ASS; 2	MNZ; 6	NÜR; 1	MIS; 1	BRN; 1	BRA; Ret	DON; 5	MAG	POR			4th	121

=== Supersport World Championship ===
==== Races by year ====
(key)

Year	Bike	1	2	3	4	5	6	7	8	9	10	11	12	13	14	Pos.	Pts
2008	Honda	QAT	AUS	SPA	NED	ITA	GER	RSM	CZE	GBR	EUR	ITA; 22	FRA; 13	POR; 20		36th	3
2009	Honda	AUS; 18	QAT; Ret	SPA; 16	NED; 11	ITA; WD	RSA; DNS	USA; Ret	RSM; Ret	GBR; 12	CZE; Ret	GER	ITA	FRA	POR	23rd	9
2011	Honda	AUS	EUR	NED	ITA	RSM	SPA	CZE; Ret	GBR	GER; 19	ITA; 13	FRA; 18	POR			29th	3
