= Michele Magnoni =

Italian motorcycle racer (born 1988)

Michele Magnoni (born 18 July 1988) is a motorcycle racer from Italy. He competed in the FIM Superstock 1000 Cup in 2010.

== Career statistics ==
=== Career highlights ===
- 2005 - 30th, European Superstock 600 Championship, Yamaha YZF-R6
- 2006 - 23rd, European Superstock 600 Championship, Yamaha YZF-R6
- 2007 - 3rd, European Superstock 600 Championship, Yamaha YZF-R6
- 2008 - 14th, FIM Superstock 1000 Cup, Yamaha YZF-R1
- 2009 - 12th, FIM Superstock 1000 Cup, Yamaha YZF-R1
- 2010 - 3rd, FIM Superstock 1000 Cup, Honda
- 2015 - 32nd, FIM Superstock 1000 Cup, Yamaha YZF-R1

=== European Superstock 600 ===
==== Races by year ====
(key) (Races in bold indicate pole position, races in italics indicate fastest lap)

Year	Bike	1	2	3	4	5	6	7	8	9	10	11	12	Pos	Pts
2005	Yamaha	VAL	MNZ	SIL	MIS; 9	BRN	BRA	ASS	LAU	IMO	MAG			30th	16
2006	Yamaha	VAL	MNZ	SIL	MIS	BRN	BRA	ASS	LAU	IMO; 4	MAG			23rd	13
2007	Yamaha	DON; 1	SPA; 7	ASS; 5	MNZ; 1	SIL; C	MIS; 5	BRN; 5	BRA; 4	BRA; 2	LAU; 10	VAL; 2	MAG; 2	3rd	155

=== FIM Superstock 1000 Cup ===
==== Races by year ====
(key) (Races in bold indicate pole position) (Races in italics indicate fastest lap)

Year	Bike	1	2	3	4	5	6	7	8	9	10	Pos	Pts
2008	Yamaha	VAL; 10	NED; Ret	MNZ; 5	NŰR; 9	SMR; Ret	BRN; 10	BRA; 21	DON; Ret	MAG; Ret	ALG; Ret	14th	30
2009	Yamaha	VAL; 8	NED; 17	MNZ	SMR; 5	DON	BRN	NŰR	IMO; 3	MAG	ALG	24th	8
2010	Honda	ALG; 14	VAL; 4	NED; 4	MNZ; 2	SMR; 3	BRN; 6	SIL; 5	NŰR; 6	IMO; Ret	MAG; 12	3rd	98
2013	BMW	ARA	NED	MNZ; 5	ALG	IMO	SIL	SIL	NŰR	MAG	JER	18th	11
2015	Yamaha	ARA; 14	NED; DNS	IMO	DON; Ret	ALG	MIS	JER	MAG			32nd	2
