= Yannick Guerra =

Spanish motorcycle racer

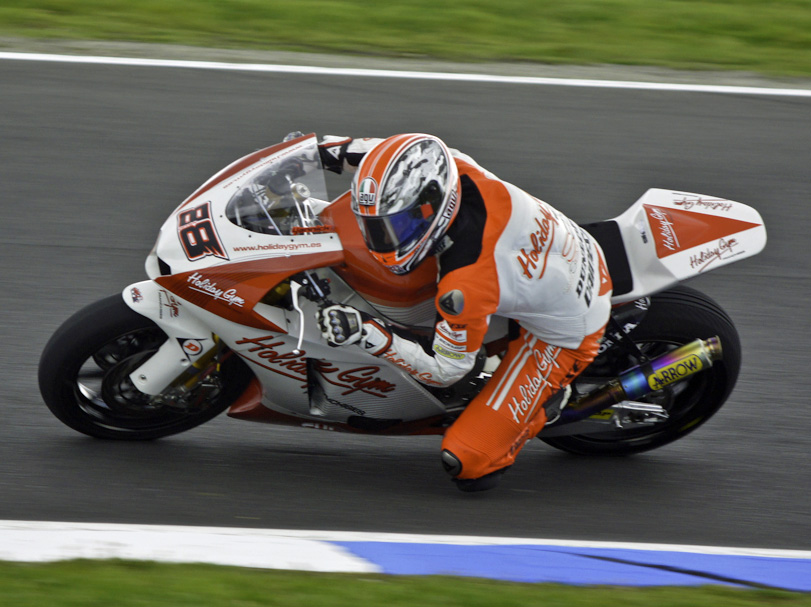
- Guerra at the 2010 Australian Grand Prix
- Nationality: Spanish
- Born: 16 August 1988 (age 38); Lausanne, Switzerland
Motorcycle racing career statistics
Moto2 World Championship
Active years	2010
Manufacturers	Moriwaki
Starts / Wins / Podiums / Poles / F. laps / Points; 14 / 0 / 0 / 0 / 0 / 0
Supersport World Championship
Active years	2009
Manufacturers	Yamaha
Starts / Wins / Podiums / Poles / F. laps / Points; 13 / 0 / 0 / 0 / 0 / 1

Yannick Guerra Dorribo (born 16 August 1988) is a Spanish motorcycle racer.

== Career statistics ==
2006 - NC, European Superstock 600 Championship, Yamaha YZF-R6
2007 - 27th, European Superstock 600 Championship, Yamaha YZF-R6
2008 - 27th, European Superstock 600 Championship, Yamaha YZF-R6

=== European Superstock 600 ===
==== Races by year ====
(key) (Races in bold indicate pole position, races in italics indicate fastest lap)

Year	Bike	1	2	3	4	5	6	7	8	9	10	11	12	Pos	Pts
2006	Yamaha	VAL; 21	MNZ; Ret	SIL; Ret	MIS; 32	BRN; 26	BRA; 23	ASS; 25	LAU; 25	IMO; 29	MAG; 19			NC	0
2007	Yamaha	DON; 23	SPA; 25	ASS; 27	MNZ; 23	SIL; C	MIS; 23	BRN; 27	BRA; 19	BRA; 21	LAU; 8	VAL; 17	MAG; 16	27th	8
2008	Yamaha	VAL; 21	ASS; 21	MNZ; 11	NÜR; 24	MIS; 19	BRN; 16	BRA; 16	DON; 18	MAG; 13	POR; 19			27th	8

=== Supersport World Championship ===
==== Races by year ====
(key)

Year	Bike	1	2	3	4	5	6	7	8	9	10	11	12	13	14	Pos.	Pts
2009	Yamaha	AUS; 25	QAT; 21	SPA; 20	NED; 22	ITA; Ret	RSA; 22	USA; 22	SMR; 15	GBR; 19	CZE; 19	GER; 22	ITA; DNQ	FRA; NC	POR; 18	36th	1

=== Grand Prix motorcycle racing ===
==== By season ====
Season	Class	Motorcycle	Team	Race	Win	Podium	Pole	FLap	Pts	Plcd
2010	Moto2	Moriwaki	Holiday Gym G22	14	0	0	0	0	0	NC
Total				**14**	**0**	**0**	**0**	**0**	**0**	

==== Races by year ====
(key)

Year	Class	Bike	1	2	3	4	5	6	7	8	9	10	11	12	13	14	15	16	17	Pos.	Pts
2010	Moto2	Moriwaki	QAT; 30	SPA; 33	FRA; 25	ITA; 30	GBR	NED	CAT	GER; 26	CZE; 33	INP; 24	RSM; 26	ARA; 24	JPN; 29	MAL; Ret	AUS; 33	POR; 28	VAL; 31	NC	0
