= Martin Bauer (motorcyclist) =

Austrian motorcycle racer

- Nationality: Austrian
- Born: 30 December 1975 (age 50); Mödling, Austria
Motorcycle racing career statistics
MotoGP World Championship
Active years	2013
Manufacturers	S&B Suter
Championships	0
2013 championship position	NC (0 pts)
Starts / Wins / Podiums / Poles / F. laps / Points; 2 / 0 / 0 / 0 / 0 / 0
Superbike World Championship
Active years	2007–2008
Manufacturers	Honda
Starts / Wins / Podiums / Poles / F. laps / Points; 4 / 0 / 0 / 0 / 0 / 0

Martin Bauer (born 30 December 1975 in Mödling) is an Austrian former motorcycle racer.

Bauer was champion of the German IDM Superbike series in 2007, 2008 and 2011 riding a Honda CBR1000RR in 2007 and 2008 and a KTM 1190 RC8 in 2011, he also has raced in two Superbike World Championship rounds, one in 2007 and other in 2008 riding a Honda; in 2007 he raced as a wildcard for Holzhauer Racing Promotion in the Eurospeedway Lausitz round, retiring in race 1 and finishing 17th in race 2, while in 2008, he raced for Hannspree Ten Kate Honda replacing an injured Ryuichi Kiyonari in the Magny-Cours round, finishing 17th in race 1 and retiring in race 2.

In 2013, Bauer raced as a wildcard in MotoGP, riding a Suter-BMW for Remus Racing Team in the Czech Republic Grand Prix, finishing 21st, and in the Valencian Community Grand Prix, finishing 20th, one lap down in both occasions. He was the first Austrian to race in the premier class of Grands Prix since Andreas Meklau in the 1993 500cc season.

== Career statistics ==
=== Superstock European Championship ===
==== Races by year ====
(key) (Races in bold indicate pole position) (Races in italics indicate fastest lap)

Year	Bike	1	2	3	4	5	6	7	8	9	Pos	Pts
2000	Kawasaki	DON	MNZ; 7	HOC	SMR	VAL; 7	BRA; 5	OSC; 20	NED; 13	BRA2	16th	3

=== Grand Prix motorcycle racing ===
==== By season ====
Season	Class	Motorcycle	Team	Number	Race	Win	Podium	Pole	FLap	Pts	Plcd
2013	MotoGP	S&B Suter	Remus Racing Team	45	2	0	0	0	0	0	NC
Total					**2**	**0**	**0**	**0**	**0**	**0**	

==== Races by year ====
(key)

Year	Class	Bike	1	2	3	4	5	6	7	8	9	10	11	12	13	14	15	16	17	18	Pos	Pts
2013	MotoGP	S&B Suter	QAT	AME	SPA	FRA	ITA	CAT	NED	GER	USA	INP	CZE; 21	GBR	RSM	ARA	MAL	AUS	JPN	VAL; 20	NC	0

=== Superbike World Championship ===
==== Races by year ====
Year	Make	1		2		3		4		5		6		7		8		9		10		11		12		13		14		Pos.	Pts
Year	Make	R1	R2	R1	R2	R1	R2	R1	R2	R1	R2	R1	R2	R1	R2	R1	R2	R1	R2	R1	R2	R1	R2	R1	R2	R1	R2	R1	R2	Pos.	Pts
2007	Honda	QAT	QAT	AUS	AUS	EUR	EUR	SPA	SPA	NED	NED	ITA	ITA	GBR	GBR	SMR	SMR	CZE	CZE	GBR	GBR	GER; Ret	GER; 17	ITA	ITA	FRA	FRA			NC	0
2008	Honda	QAT	QAT	AUS	AUS	SPA	SPA	NED	NED	ITA	ITA	USA	USA	GER	GER	SMR	SMR	CZE	CZE	GBR	GBR	EUR	EUR	ITA	ITA	FRA; 17	FRA; Ret	POR	POR	NC	0
