= Luca Morelli =

Italian motorcycle racer

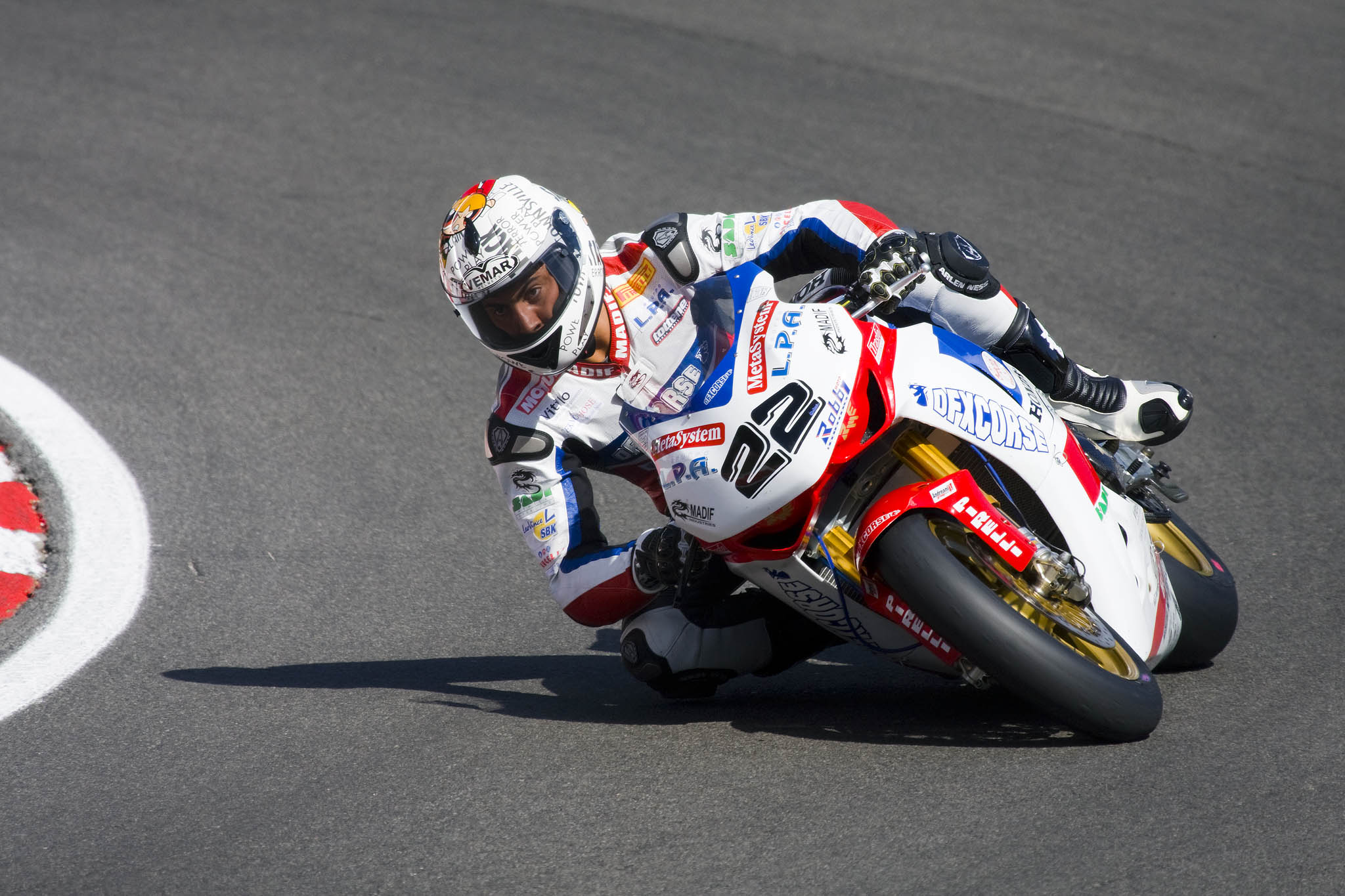
- Morelli at the 2008 Brands Hatch Superbike World Championship round
- Nationality: Italian
- Born: 31 December 1987 (age 38); Ariano Irpino, Italy
Motorcycle racing career statistics
250cc World Championship
Active years	2006
Manufacturers	Aprilia
Starts / Wins / Podiums / Poles / F. laps / Points; 15 / 0 / 0 / 0 / 0 / 2
Superbike World Championship
Active years	2007–2008
Manufacturers	Ducati, Honda
Starts / Wins / Podiums / Poles / F. laps / Points; 32 / 0 / 0 / 0 / 0 / 11

Domenico Luca Morelli (born 31 December 1987) is an Italian motorcycle racer who has competed in the 250cc World Championship, the Superbike World Championship and the Superstock 1000 FIM Cup.

== Career statistics ==
- 2009 – 35th, FIM Superstock 1000 Cup, Kawasaki ZX-10R

=== CIV Championship (Campionato Italiano Velocità) ===
==== Races by year ====
(key) (Races in bold indicate pole position; races in italics indicate fastest lap)

Year	Class	Bike	1	2	3	4	5	6	Pos	Pts
2004	125cc	Aprilia	MUG; 15	IMO; 16	VAL1; Ret	MIS; 6	VAL2; 6		14th	19
2005	125cc	Aprilia	VAL; Ret	MON; 11	IMO; 22	MIS1; Ret	MUG	MIS2	27th	5
2005	Stock 1000	Yamaha	VAL	MON; 15	IMO	MIS1	MUG; Ret	MIS2	29th	1

=== Grand Prix motorcycle racing ===
==== By season ====
Season	Class	Motorcycle	Team	Race	Win	Podium	Pole	FLap	Pts	Plcd
2006	250cc	Aprilia	Nocable Angaia Racing	15	0	0	0	0	2	33rd
Total				**15**	**0**	**0**	**0**	**0**	**2**	

==== Races by year ====
(key)

Year	Class	Bike	1	2	3	4	5	6	7	8	9	10	11	12	13	14	15	16	Pos.	Pts
2006	250cc	Aprilia	SPA; Ret	QAT; 18	TUR; 18	CHN; Ret	FRA; 21	ITA; Ret	CAT; 19	NED; 18	GBR; 19	GER; 21	CZE; DNS	MAL; 14	AUS; 20	JPN; Ret	POR; 21	VAL; 24	33rd	2

=== Superbike World Championship ===
==== Races by year ====
(key)

Year	Bike	1		2		3		4		5		6		7		8		9		10		11		12		13		14		Pos.	Pts
Year	Bike	R1	R2	R1	R2	R1	R2	R1	R2	R1	R2	R1	R2	R1	R2	R1	R2	R1	R2	R1	R2	R1	R2	R1	R2	R1	R2	R1	R2	Pos.	Pts
2007	Ducati	QAT	QAT	AUS	AUS	EUR; 16	EUR; 17	SPA; Ret	SPA; Ret	NED; Ret	NED; 14	ITA; Ret	ITA; DNS																	22nd	11
2007	Honda													GBR; 12	GBR; C	SMR; 13	SMR; 18	CZE; Ret	CZE; 16	GBR; 17	GBR; 18	GER; Ret	GER; Ret	ITA; 16	ITA; 17	FRA; Ret	FRA; 14			22nd	11
2008	Honda	QAT; Ret	QAT; Ret	AUS; DNS	AUS; DNS	SPA; 18	SPA; 23	NED; Ret	NED; Ret	ITA; 17	ITA; Ret	USA	USA	GER	GER	SMR; WD	SMR; WD	CZE	CZE	GBR; 21	GBR; 24	EUR; Ret	EUR; Ret	ITA	ITA	FRA	FRA	POR	POR	NC	0

=== FIM Superstock 1000 Cup ===
==== Races by year ====
(key) (Races in bold indicate pole position) (Races in italics indicate fastest lap)

Year	Bike	1	2	3	4	5	6	7	8	9	10	Pos	Pts
2009	Kawasaki	VAL; Ret	NED; 23	MNZ; 14	SMR; 16	DON	BRN; WD	NŰR	IMO	MAG	ALG	35th	2
