= 2007 Superbike World Championship =

2007 Superbike World Championship
Previous:	2006	Next:	2008
Support series: Supersport World Championship; FIM Superstock 1000 Cup; European Superstock 600

The 2007 Superbike World Championship was the twentieth FIM Superbike World Championship season. The season started on 24 February at Losail and finished on 7 October at Magny-Cours after 13 rounds.

The main title contenders were 2004 champion James Toseland on a Honda, 2006 champion Troy Bayliss on a Ducati, former MotoGP rider Max Biaggi on a Suzuki, and Noriyuki Haga on a Yamaha. Bayliss spent the season riding a Ducati 999, even though production of the 999 had ended in 2006 and the bike had been replaced by the Ducati 1098. To satisfy homologation requirements, Ducati produced 150 limited edition 999 models.

The championship was won by James Toseland in the final race of the season. Toseland's 415 points gave him a 2-point margin over Haga, with Biaggi in third position with 397 points. The manufacturers' championship was won by Yamaha.

This was also the final season Corona Extra provided title sponsorship, having done so since 1998. From 2008 HANNspree took on this role in a deal up to and including the 2010 season.

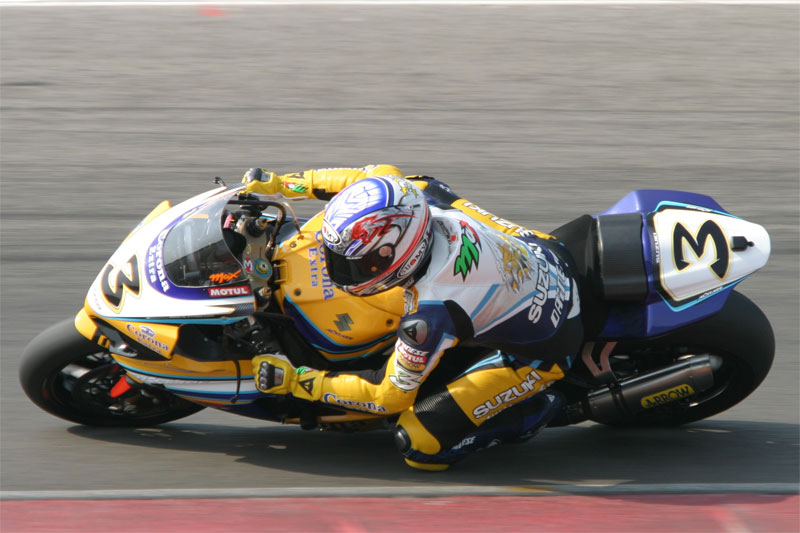
Max Biaggi riding his Alstare Suzuki GSX-R1000 K7 at Assen.

== Race calendar and results ==
2007 Superbike World Championship Calendar
Round		Country	Circuit	Date	Superpole	Fastest lap	Winning rider	Winning team	Report
1	R1	Qatar	Losail	24 February	(Australia) Troy Corser	(Italy) Max Biaggi	(Italy) Max Biaggi	Alstare Suzuki	Report
1	R2	Qatar	Losail	24 February	(Australia) Troy Corser	(Italy) Max Biaggi	(United Kingdom) James Toseland	Ten Kate Honda	Report
2	R1	Australia	Phillip Island	4 March	(Australia) Troy Bayliss	(Australia) Troy Corser	(Australia) Troy Bayliss	Xerox Ducati	Report
2	R2	Australia	Phillip Island	4 March	(Australia) Troy Bayliss	(Japan) Noriyuki Haga	(United Kingdom) James Toseland	Ten Kate Honda	Report
3	R1	Europe	Donington Park	1 April	(Australia) Troy Bayliss	(Australia) Troy Bayliss	(United Kingdom) James Toseland	Ten Kate Honda	Report
3	R2	Europe	Donington Park	1 April	(Australia) Troy Bayliss	(Japan) Noriyuki Haga	(Japan) Noriyuki Haga	Yamaha Motor Italia	Report
4	R1	Spain	Valencia	15 April	(Australia) Troy Bayliss	(Australia) Troy Bayliss	(Spain) Rubén Xaus	Team Sterilgarda	Report
4	R2	Spain	Valencia	15 April	(Australia) Troy Bayliss	(Japan) Noriyuki Haga	(United Kingdom) James Toseland	Ten Kate Honda	Report
5	R1	Netherlands	Assen	29 April	(United Kingdom) James Toseland	(Australia) Troy Bayliss	(United Kingdom) James Toseland	Ten Kate Honda	Report
5	R2	Netherlands	Assen	29 April	(United Kingdom) James Toseland	(Japan) Noriyuki Haga	(Australia) Troy Bayliss	Xerox Ducati	Report
6	R1	Italy	Monza	13 May	(Japan) Noriyuki Haga	(Italy) Max Biaggi	(Japan) Noriyuki Haga	Yamaha Motor Italia	Report
6	R2	Italy	Monza	13 May	(Japan) Noriyuki Haga	(Japan) Noriyuki Haga	(Japan) Noriyuki Haga	Yamaha Motor Italia	Report
7	R1	(United Kingdom) Great Britain	Silverstone	27 May	(Australia) Troy Bayliss	(Japan) Noriyuki Haga	(Australia) Troy Bayliss	Xerox Ducati	Report
7	R2	(United Kingdom) Great Britain	Silverstone	27 May	(Australia) Troy Bayliss	Race cancelled^{1}			Report
8	R1	San Marino	Misano Adriatico	17 June	(Australia) Troy Corser	(Japan) Noriyuki Haga	(Australia) Troy Bayliss	Xerox Ducati	Report
8	R2	San Marino	Misano Adriatico	17 June	(Australia) Troy Corser	(Australia) Troy Bayliss	(Australia) Troy Bayliss	Xerox Ducati	Report
9	R1	Czech Republic	Brno	22 July	(Japan) Noriyuki Haga	(Japan) Noriyuki Haga	(United Kingdom) James Toseland	Ten Kate Honda	Report
9	R2	Czech Republic	Brno	22 July	(Japan) Noriyuki Haga	(Australia) Troy Corser	(Italy) Max Biaggi	Alstare Suzuki	Report
10	R1	(United Kingdom) Great Britain	Brands Hatch	5 August	(Australia) Troy Bayliss	(Japan) Noriyuki Haga	(United Kingdom) James Toseland	Ten Kate Honda	Report
10	R2	(United Kingdom) Great Britain	Brands Hatch	5 August	(Australia) Troy Bayliss	(United Kingdom) James Toseland	(United Kingdom) James Toseland	Ten Kate Honda	Report
11	R1	Germany	Lausitzring	9 September	(Spain) Fonsi Nieto	(Japan) Noriyuki Haga	(Japan) Noriyuki Haga	Yamaha Motor Italia	Report
11	R2	Germany	Lausitzring	9 September	(Spain) Fonsi Nieto	(Japan) Noriyuki Haga	(Australia) Troy Bayliss	Xerox Ducati	Report
12	R1	Italy	Vallelunga	30 September	(Australia) Troy Bayliss	(Japan) Noriyuki Haga	(Italy) Max Biaggi	Alstare Suzuki	Report
12	R2	Italy	Vallelunga	30 September	(Australia) Troy Bayliss	(Italy) Max Biaggi	(Australia) Troy Bayliss	Xerox Ducati	Report
13	R1	France	Magny-Cours	7 October	(United Kingdom) James Toseland	(Germany) Max Neukirchner	(Japan) Noriyuki Haga	Yamaha Motor Italia	Report
13	R2	France	Magny-Cours	7 October	(United Kingdom) James Toseland	(Italy) Max Biaggi	(Japan) Noriyuki Haga	Yamaha Motor Italia	Report

1. – Second race at Silverstone was cancelled due to heavy rain.

== Entry list ==
2007 entry list
Team	Constructor	Motorcycle	No.	Rider	Rounds
(Belgium) Alstare Suzuki Corona Extra	Suzuki	Suzuki GSX-R1000 K7	3	(Italy) Max Biaggi	All
(Belgium) Alstare Suzuki Corona Extra	Suzuki	Suzuki GSX-R1000 K7	71	(Japan) Yukio Kagayama	1–12
(Belgium) Alstare Suzuki Corona Extra	Suzuki	Suzuki GSX-R1000 K7	83	(France) Guillaume Dietrich	13
(San Marino) Kawasaki PSG-1 Corse	Kawasaki	Kawasaki ZX-10R	10	(Spain) Fonsi Nieto	All
(San Marino) Kawasaki PSG-1 Corse	Kawasaki	Kawasaki ZX-10R	13	(Italy) Vittorio Iannuzzo	7, 9, 12
(San Marino) Kawasaki PSG-1 Corse	Kawasaki	Kawasaki ZX-10R	55	(France) Régis Laconi	All
(San Marino) Kawasaki PSG-1 Corse	Kawasaki	Kawasaki ZX-10R	92	(Italy) Mauro Sanchini	6, 8
(Italy) Yamaha Motor Italia	Yamaha	Yamaha YZF-R1	11	(Australia) Troy Corser	All
(Italy) Yamaha Motor Italia	Yamaha	Yamaha YZF-R1	41	(Japan) Noriyuki Haga	All
(Czech Republic) Prorace	Suzuki	Suzuki GSX-R1000 K6	15	(Czech Republic) Miloš Čihák	9
(Italy) Team Sterilgarda	Ducati	Ducati 999 F06	20	(Italy) Marco Borciani	6, 8, 12
(Italy) Team Sterilgarda	Ducati	Ducati 999 F06	111	(Spain) Rubén Xaus	All
(Italy) Team Sterilgarda	Ducati	Ducati 999 F06	200	(Italy) Giovanni Bussei	3–4
(Italy) Ducati Xerox Team	Ducati	Ducati 999 F07	21	(Australia) Troy Bayliss	All
(Italy) Ducati Xerox Team	Ducati	Ducati 999 F07	57	(Italy) Lorenzo Lanzi	All
(Italy) D.F.X. Corse	Honda	Honda CBR1000RR	22	(Italy) Luca Morelli	7–13
(Italy) D.F.X. Corse	Honda	Honda CBR1000RR	84	(Italy) Michel Fabrizio	All
(Italy) D.F.X. Corse	Honda	Honda CBR1000RR	99	(Australia) Steve Martin	1–4, 6
(United Kingdom) Alto Evolution Honda	Honda	Honda CBR1000RR	25	(Australia) Joshua Brookes	1–7
(United Kingdom) Alto Evolution Honda	Honda	Honda CBR1000RR	31	(Australia) Karl Muggeridge	1–7, 9–13
(United Kingdom) Alto Evolution Honda	Honda	Honda CBR1000RR	32	(France) Yoann Tiberio	11–13
(Italy) Emmebi Team	Honda	Honda CBR1000RR	34	(Italy) Luca Conforti	8
(Czech Republic) Yamaha Jr. Pro SBK Racing	Yamaha	Yamaha YZF-R1	36	(Czech Republic) Jiří Dražďák	1–2, 9, 11
(Czech Republic) Yamaha Jr. Pro SBK Racing	Yamaha	Yamaha YZF-R1	85	(Czech Republic) Marek Svoboda	5–6
(Japan) Yamaha YZF	Yamaha	Yamaha YZF-R1	38	(Japan) Shinichi Nakatomi	All
(Japan) Yamaha YZF	Yamaha	Yamaha YZF-R1	99	(Australia) Steve Martin	10
(Italy) Team Giesse	Yamaha	Yamaha YZF-R1	40	(Venezuela) Robertino Pietri	6
(Italy) Team Pedercini	Ducati	Ducati 999RS	22	(Italy) Luca Morelli	3–6
(Italy) Team Pedercini	Ducati	Ducati 999RS	42	(United Kingdom) Dean Ellison	All
(Netherlands) Hannspree Ten Kate Honda	Honda	Honda CBR1000RR	44	(Italy) Roberto Rolfo	All
(Netherlands) Hannspree Ten Kate Honda	Honda	Honda CBR1000RR	52	(United Kingdom) James Toseland	All
(Germany) Holzhauer Racing Promotion	Honda	Honda CBR1000RR	45	(Austria) Martin Bauer	11
(Italy) Celani Team Suzuki Italia	Suzuki	Suzuki GSX-R1000 K6	53	(Italy) Alessandro Polita	1–3, 5–8
(Italy) Celani Team Suzuki Italia	Suzuki	Suzuki GSX-R1000 K6	99	(Australia) Steve Martin	11–13
(Italy) Celani Team Suzuki Italia	Suzuki	Suzuki GSX-R1000 K6	112	(Italy) Stefano Cruciani	9–10
(United Kingdom) SMT Yamaha	Yamaha	Yamaha YZF-R1	64	(United Kingdom) Aaron Zanotti	3
(Austria) LBR Racing Team	MV Agusta	MV Agusta F4 312 R	73	(Austria) Christian Zaiser	1–5, 8–9
Suzuki Germany	Suzuki	Suzuki GSX-R1000 K6	76	(Germany) Max Neukirchner	All
(United Kingdom) Nuttravel.com	Yamaha	Yamaha YZF-R1	77	(United Kingdom) Marty Nutt	10
(Spain) D'Antin MotoGP	Kawasaki	Kawasaki ZX-10R	95	(Qatar) Mashel Al Naimi	1
(Italy) Team Caracchi Ducati SC	Ducati	Ducati 999 F05	96	(Czech Republic) Jakub Smrž	All
(Italy) Team Guandalini	Ducati	Ducati 999 F05	117	(Italy) Norino Brignola	12
(Spain) Team Laglisse	Yamaha	Yamaha YZF-R1	131	(Spain) Carmelo Morales	4

Key
Regular rider
Wildcard rider
Replacement rider

- All entries utilized Pirelli tyres.

On 20 March DFX Honda dropped Steve Martin from their rider lineup due to a lack of funds. On 27 March DFX Honda and Steve Martin reached an agreement which saw the rider on track at Donington and from there, on a race by race basis for the next three races.

== Championship standings ==
=== Riders' standings ===
2007 final riders' standings
Pos.	Rider	Bike	QAT (Qatar)		AUS (Australia)		EUR (European Union)		ESP (Spain)		NED (Netherlands)		ITA (Italy)		GBR (United Kingdom)		SMR (San Marino)		CZE (Czech Republic)		GBR (United Kingdom)		GER (Germany)		ITA (Italy)		FRA (France)		Pts
Pos.	Rider	Bike	R1	R2	R1	R2	R1	R2	R1	R2	R1	R2	R1	R2	R1	R2	R1	R2	R1	R2	R1	R2	R1	R2	R1	R2	R1	R2	Pts
1	(United Kingdom) James Toseland	Honda	2	1	2	1	1	Ret	5	1	**1**	**2**	4	2	8	C	4	6	1	2	1	1	9	4	3	11	**7**	**6**	415
2	(Japan) Noriyuki Haga	Yamaha	8	4	4	3	4	1	2	3	2	Ret	**1**	**1**	2	C	Ret	2	**4**	**4**	7	2	1	2	4	3	1	1	413
3	(Italy) Max Biaggi	Suzuki	1	2	3	4	3	2	8	2	6	3	3	5	6	C	Ret	3	2	1	3	8	2	3	1	2	6	2	397
4	(Australia) Troy Bayliss	Ducati	5	8	**1**	**2**	**Ret**	**DNS**	**3**	**6**	4	1	2	**3**	**1**	C	1	1	Ret	6	**Ret**	**7**	4	1	**2**	**1**	2	5	372
5	(Australia) Troy Corser	Yamaha	**9**	**3**	5	5	2	3	4	9	17	4	5	6	3	C	**2**	**5**	7	Ret	2	3	3	5	Ret	4	3	4	296
6	(Spain) Rubén Xaus	Ducati	10	9	7	6	Ret	4	1	4	3	Ret	12	13	9	C	8	7	12	10	4	6	12	6	Ret	6	8	10	201
7	(Italy) Lorenzo Lanzi	Ducati	3	7	6	7	5	5	6	5	5	Ret	7	Ret	7	C	6	9	8	7	9	12	8	12	6	7	Ret	DNS	192
8	(Italy) Roberto Rolfo	Honda	7	Ret	11	10	9	7	10	12	9	5	Ret	4	4	C	5	8	5	5	6	11	5	7	Ret	5	10	7	192
9	(Germany) Max Neukirchner	Suzuki	6	10	8	8	8	10	12	10	10	7	10	12	10	C	9	10	9	12	10	10	Ret	10	Ret	10	4	Ret	149
10	(France) Régis Laconi	Kawasaki	Ret	11	Ret	Ret	7	6	11	8	16	10	Ret	8	5	C	7	11	11	14	8	9	6	11	7	Ret	9	8	137
11	(Italy) Michel Fabrizio	Honda	Ret	12	Ret	9	13	12	7	11	12	6	8	11	Ret	C	Ret	Ret	6	3	5	4	Ret	13	5	Ret	14	9	132
12	(Spain) Fonsi Nieto	Kawasaki	Ret	5	9	14	6	Ret	Ret	Ret	8	8	Ret	Ret	Ret	C	Ret	12	Ret	8	12	13	**7**	**8**	8	8	5	3	125
13	(Japan) Yukio Kagayama	Suzuki	4	6	DNS	DNS	DNS	DNS	15	13	7	11	6	7	Ret	C	3	4	3	Ret	Ret	5	DNS	DNS	DNS	DNS			116
14	(Czech Republic) Jakub Smrž	Ducati	14	16	14	11	10	8	14	17	11	9	15	10	Ret	C	10	13	Ret	13	14	Ret	13	16	11	Ret	Ret	Ret	66
15	(Japan) Shinichi Nakatomi	Yamaha	12	17	13	13	17	14	Ret	16	13	12	DNS	DNS	13	C	Ret	14	10	9	13	15	11	15	9	9	11	Ret	66
16	(Australia) Karl Muggeridge	Honda	Ret	14	DNS	DNS	11	9	Ret	Ret	Ret	Ret	9	9	Ret	C	DNS	DNS	Ret	11	Ret	14	10	10	13	13	12	11	62
17	(Australia) Josh Brookes	Honda	Ret	13	12	12	12	15	9	7	Ret	13	11	Ret	Ret	C													40
18	(Australia) Steve Martin	Honda	11	18	10	Ret	19	13	Ret	Ret			16	Ret															27
18	(Australia) Steve Martin	Yamaha																			11	16							27
18	(Australia) Steve Martin	Suzuki																					14	14	14	14	16	Ret	27
19	(Italy) Vittorio Iannuzzo	Kawasaki													11	C			13	15					10	12			19
20	(Italy) Marco Borciani	Ducati											13	Ret			11	Ret							12	18			12
21	(Italy) Giovanni Bussei	Ducati					14	11	13	15																			11
22	(Italy) Luca Morelli	Ducati					16	17	Ret	Ret	Ret	14	Ret	DNS															11
22	(Italy) Luca Morelli	Honda													12	C	13	18	Ret	16	17	18	Ret	Ret	16	17	Ret	14	11
23	(France) Yoann Tiberio	Honda																					15	18	15	15	13	12	10
24	(Italy) Alessandro Polita	Suzuki	13	15	15	15	Ret	DNS			DNS	DNS	14	Ret	Ret	C	Ret	17	WD	WD									8
25	(United Kingdom) Dean Ellison	Ducati	15	19	17	Ret	15	Ret	Ret	Ret	14	16	Ret	15	Ret	C	14	19	Ret	Ret	18	17	Ret	Ret	17	19	Ret	15	8
26	(Italy) Mauro Sanchini	Kawasaki											17	Ret			12	15											5
27	(France) Guillaume Dietrich	Suzuki																									15	13	4
28	(Czech Republic) Jiří Dražďák	Yamaha	Ret	Ret	18	Ret													14	Ret			16	19					2
29	(Venezuela) Robertino Pietri	Yamaha											Ret	14															2
30	(Spain) Carmelo Morales	Yamaha							Ret	14																			2
31	(Czech Republic) Marek Svoboda	Yamaha									15	15	Ret	Ret															2
32	(United Kingdom) Marty Nutt	Yamaha																			15	DNS							1
33	(Italy) Stefano Cruciani	Suzuki																	15	18	16	Ret							1
34	(Austria) Christian Zaiser	MV Agusta	16	Ret	16	16	Ret	Ret	Ret	Ret	Ret	DNS					15	Ret	Ret	Ret									1
	(United Kingdom) Aaron Zanotti	Yamaha					18	16																					0
	(Italy) Luca Conforti	Honda															Ret	16											0
	(Italy) Norino Brignola	Ducati																							Ret	16			0
	(Qatar) Mashel Al Naimi	Kawasaki	17	20																									0
	(Czech Republic) Miloš Čihák	Suzuki																	Ret	17									0
	(Austria) Martin Bauer	Honda																					Ret	17					0
Pos.	Rider	Bike	QAT (Qatar)		AUS (Australia)		EUR (European Union)		ESP (Spain)		NED (Netherlands)		ITA (Italy)		GBR (United Kingdom)		SMR (San Marino)		CZE (Czech Republic)		GBR (United Kingdom)		GER (Germany)		ITA (Italy)		FRA (France)		Pts

Colour	Result
Gold	Winner
Silver	Second place
Bronze	Third place
Green	Points classification
Blue	Non-points classification
Blue	Non-classified finish (NC)
Purple	Retired, not classified (Ret)
Red	Did not qualify (DNQ)
Red	Did not pre-qualify (DNPQ)
Black	Disqualified (DSQ)
White	Did not start (DNS)
White	Withdrew (WD)
White	Race cancelled (C)
Blank	Did not practice (DNP)
Blank	Did not arrive (DNA)
Blank	Excluded (EX)

**Bold** – Pole position
Italics – Fastest lap

=== Teams' standings ===
Pos.	Team	Bike No.	QAT (Qatar)		AUS (Australia)		EUR (European Union)		ESP (Spain)		NED (Netherlands)		ITA (Italy)		GBR (United Kingdom)		SMR (San Marino)		CZE (Czech Republic)		GBR (United Kingdom)		GER (Germany)		ITA (Italy)		FRA (France)		Pts.
Pos.	Team	Bike No.	R1	R2	R1	R2	R1	R2	R1	R2	R1	R2	R1	R2	R1	R2	R1	R2	R1	R2	R1	R2	R1	R2	R1	R2	R1	R2	Pts.
1	(Italy) Yamaha Motor Italia	11	**9**	**3**	5	5	2	3	4	9	17	4	5	6	3	C	**2**	**5**	7	Ret	2	3	3	5	Ret	4	3	4	709
1	(Italy) Yamaha Motor Italia	41	8	4	4	3	4	1	2	3	2	Ret	**1**	**1**	2	C	Ret	2	**4**	**4**	7	2	1	2	4	3	1	1	709
2	(Netherlands) Hannspree Ten Kate Honda	44	7	Ret	11	10	9	7	10	12	9	5	Ret	4	4	C	5	8	5	5	6	11	5	7	Ret	5	10	7	607
2	(Netherlands) Hannspree Ten Kate Honda	52	2	1	2	1	1	Ret	5	1	**1**	**2**	4	2	8	C	4	6	1	2	1	1	9	4	3	11	**7**	**6**	607
3	(Italy) Ducati Xerox Team	21	5	8	**1**	**2**	**Ret**	**DNS**	**3**	**6**	4	1	2	**3**	**1**	C	1	1	Ret	6	**Ret**	**7**	4	1	**2**	**1**	2	5	564
3	(Italy) Ducati Xerox Team	57	3	7	6	7	5	5	6	5	5	Ret	7	Ret	7	C	6	9	8	7	9	12	8	12	6	7	Ret	DNS	564
4	(Belgium) Alstare Suzuki Corona Extra	3	1	2	3	4	3	2	8	2	6	3	3	5	6	C	Ret	3	2	1	3	8	2	3	1	2	6	2	517
4	(Belgium) Alstare Suzuki Corona Extra	71	4	6	DNS	DNS	DNS	DNS	15	13	7	11	6	7	Ret	C	3	4	3	Ret	Ret	5	DNS	DNS	DNS	DNS			517
4	(Belgium) Alstare Suzuki Corona Extra	83																									15	13	517
5	(San Marino) Kawasaki PSG-1 Corse	10	Ret	5	9	14	6	Ret	Ret	Ret	8	8	Ret	Ret	Ret	C	Ret	12	Ret	8	12	13	**7**	**8**	8	8	5	3	262
5	(San Marino) Kawasaki PSG-1 Corse	55	Ret	11	Ret	Ret	7	6	11	8	16	10	Ret	8	5	C	7	11	11	14	8	9	6	11	7	Ret	9	8	262
6	(Italy) Team Sterilgarda	111	10	9	7	6	Ret	4	1	4	3	Ret	12	13	9	C	8	7	12	10	4	6	12	6	Ret	6	8	10	201
7	(Italy) D.F.X. Corse	22													12	C	13	18	Ret	16	17	18	Ret	Ret	16	17	Ret	14	155
7	(Italy) D.F.X. Corse	84	Ret	12	Ret	9	13	12	7	11	12	6	8	11	Ret	C	Ret	Ret	6	3	5	4	Ret	13	5	Ret	14	9	155
7	(Italy) D.F.X. Corse	99	11	18	10	Ret	19	13	Ret	Ret			16	Ret															155
8	Suzuki Germany	76	6	10	8	8	8	10	12	10	10	7	10	12	10	C	9	10	9	12	10	10	Ret	10	Ret	10	4	Ret	149
9	(United Kingdom) Alto Evolution Honda	25	Ret	13	12	12	12	15	9	7	Ret	13	11	Ret	Ret	C													112
9	(United Kingdom) Alto Evolution Honda	31	Ret	14	DNS	DNS	11	9	Ret	Ret	Ret	Ret	9	9	Ret	C	DNS	DNS	Ret	11	Ret	14	10	10	13	13	12	11	112
9	(United Kingdom) Alto Evolution Honda	32																					15	18	15	15	13	12	112
10	(Italy) Team Caracchi Ducati SC	96	14	16	14	11	10	8	14	17	11	9	15	10	Ret	C	10	13	Ret	13	14	Ret	13	16	11	Ret	Ret	Ret	66
11	(Japan) YZF Yamaha	38	12	17	13	13	17	14	Ret	16	13	12	DNS	DNS	13	C	Ret	14	10	9	13	15	11	15	9	9	11	Ret	66
12	(Italy) Celani Team Suzuki Italia	53	13	15	15	15	Ret	DNS			DNS	DNS	14	Ret	Ret	C	Ret	17	WD	WD									17
12	(Italy) Celani Team Suzuki Italia	99																					14	14	14	14	16	Ret	17
12	(Italy) Celani Team Suzuki Italia	112																	15	18	16	Ret							17
13	(Italy) Team Pedercini	22					16	17	Ret	Ret	Ret	14	Ret	DNS															10
13	(Italy) Team Pedercini	42	15	19	17	Ret	15	Ret	Ret	Ret	14	16	Ret	15	Ret	C	14	19	Ret	Ret	18	17	Ret	Ret	17	19	Ret	15	10
14	(Czech Republic) Yamaha Jr. Pro SBK Racing	36	Ret	Ret	18	Ret													14	Ret			16	19					4
14	(Czech Republic) Yamaha Jr. Pro SBK Racing	85									15	15	Ret	Ret															4
15	(Austria) LBR Racing Team	73	16	Ret	16	16	Ret	Ret	Ret	Ret	Ret	DNS					15	Ret	Ret	Ret									1
Pos.	Team	Bike No.	QAT (Qatar)		AUS (Australia)		EUR (European Union)		ESP (Spain)		NED (Netherlands)		ITA (Italy)		GBR (United Kingdom)		SMR (San Marino)		CZE (Czech Republic)		GBR (United Kingdom)		GER (Germany)		ITA (Italy)		FRA (France)		Pts.

=== Manufacturers' standings ===
2007 final manufacturers' standings
Pos.	Manufacturer	QAT (Qatar)		AUS (Australia)		EUR (European Union)		ESP (Spain)		NED (Netherlands)		ITA (Italy)		GBR (United Kingdom)		SMR (San Marino)		CZE (Czech Republic)		GBR (United Kingdom)		GER (Germany)		ITA (Italy)		FRA (France)		Pts
Pos.	Manufacturer	R1	R2	R1	R2	R1	R2	R1	R2	R1	R2	R1	R2	R1	R2	R1	R2	R1	R2	R1	R2	R1	R2	R1	R2	R1	R2	Pts
1	(Japan) Yamaha	8	3	4	3	2	1	2	3	2	4	1	1	2	C	2	2	4	4	2	2	1	2	4	3	1	1	467
2	(Japan) Honda	2	1	2	1	1	7	5	1	1	2	4	2	4	C	4	6	1	2	1	1	5	4	3	5	7	6	439
3	(Italy) Ducati	3	7	1	2	5	4	1	4	3	1	2	3	1	C	1	1	8	6	4	6	4	1	2	1	2	5	439
4	(Japan) Suzuki	1	2	3	4	3	2	8	2	6	3	3	5	6	C	3	3	2	1	3	5	2	3	1	2	4	2	419
5	(Japan) Kawasaki	17	5	9	14	6	6	11	8	8	8	17	8	5	C	7	11	11	8	8	9	6	8	7	8	5	3	192
6	(Italy) MV Agusta	16	Ret	16	16	Ret	Ret	Ret	Ret	Ret	DNS					15	Ret	Ret	Ret									1
Pos.	Manufacturer	QAT (Qatar)		AUS (Australia)		EUR (European Union)		ESP (Spain)		NED (Netherlands)		ITA (Italy)		GBR (United Kingdom)		SMR (San Marino)		CZE (Czech Republic)		GBR (United Kingdom)		GER (Germany)		ITA (Italy)		FRA (France)		Pts
