= 2008 Superbike World Championship =

2008 Superbike World Championship
Previous:	2007	Next:	2009
Support series: Supersport World Championship; FIM Superstock 1000 Cup; European Superstock 600 Championship

The 2008 Superbike World Championship was the twenty-first season of the Superbike World Championship. Corona Extra ceased to be the championship's title sponsor, as it had been since 1998. The electronics manufacturer HANNspree took over as the title sponsor in 2008 and this arrangement remained in place until 2010, with the championship officially known as the "HANNspree SBK Superbike World Championship".

The Superbike World Championship returned to the United States on 1 June 2008, for the 6th round of the Superbike World Championship. The round took place at the Miller Motorsports Park near Salt Lake City, Utah. This was the first time SBK had raced in the United States since the 2004 round at Mazda Raceway Laguna Seca. The Superbike World Championship shared the weekend with the AMA Superbike Championship and its support classes. However to avoid direct comparisons between World Superbike and AMA Superbike, and because of sponsorship issues the two championships raced on different configurations of the circuit. World Superbikes used the 3.048 miles (4.905 km) Outer Track, while AMA Superbike and its support classes used the 4.5 miles (7.2 km) Main Track.

The provisional championship calendar was made up of 15 rounds but the Indonesian round in Sentul International Circuit was removed from the final calendar.

Australian rider Troy Bayliss won his third Superbike World Championship riding the factory supported Ducati 1098. He secured the title with his 50th race win at the second race at Magny-Cours.

== Race calendar and results ==
2008 Superbike World Championship Calendar
Round		Country	Circuit	Date	Superpole	Fastest lap	Winning rider	Winning team	Report
1	R1	Qatar	Losail	23 February	(Australia) Troy Corser	(Japan) Noriyuki Haga	(Australia) Troy Bayliss	Ducati Xerox Team	Report
1	R2	Qatar	Losail	23 February	(Australia) Troy Corser	(Spain) Fonsi Nieto	(Spain) Fonsi Nieto	Team Alstare Suzuki	Report
2	R1	Australia	Phillip Island	2 March	(Australia) Troy Bayliss	(Australia) Troy Bayliss	(Australia) Troy Bayliss	Ducati Xerox Team	Report
2	R2	Australia	Phillip Island	2 March	(Australia) Troy Bayliss	(Italy) Max Biaggi	(Australia) Troy Bayliss	Ducati Xerox Team	Report
3	R1	Spain	Valencia	6 April	(Germany) Max Neukirchner	(Japan) Noriyuki Haga	(Italy) Lorenzo Lanzi	R.G. Team	Report
3	R2	Spain	Valencia	6 April	(Germany) Max Neukirchner	(Spain) Carlos Checa	(Japan) Noriyuki Haga	Yamaha Motor Italia WSB	Report
4	R1	Netherlands	Assen	27 April	(Australia) Troy Bayliss	(Germany) Max Neukirchner	(Australia) Troy Bayliss	Ducati Xerox Team	Report
4	R2	Netherlands	Assen	27 April	(Australia) Troy Bayliss	(Australia) Troy Bayliss	(Australia) Troy Bayliss	Ducati Xerox Team	Report
5	R1	Italy	Monza	11 May	(Australia) Troy Bayliss	(Japan) Noriyuki Haga	(Germany) Max Neukirchner	Team Alstare Suzuki	Report
5	R2	Italy	Monza	11 May	(Australia) Troy Bayliss	(Japan) Noriyuki Haga	(Japan) Noriyuki Haga	Yamaha Motor Italia WSB	Report
6	R1	United States	Miller Motorsports Park	1 June	(Spain) Carlos Checa	(Spain) Carlos Checa	(Spain) Carlos Checa	Hannspree Ten Kate Honda	Report
6	R2	United States	Miller Motorsports Park	1 June	(Spain) Carlos Checa	(Spain) Carlos Checa	(Spain) Carlos Checa	Hannspree Ten Kate Honda	Report
7	R1	Germany	Nürburgring	15 June	(Germany) Max Neukirchner	(Australia) Troy Bayliss	(Japan) Noriyuki Haga	Yamaha Motor Italia WSB	Report
7	R2	Germany	Nürburgring	15 June	(Germany) Max Neukirchner	(Japan) Noriyuki Haga	(Japan) Noriyuki Haga	Yamaha Motor Italia WSB	Report
8	R1	San Marino	Misano Adriatico	29 June	(Australia) Troy Corser	(Czech Republic) Jakub Smrž	(Germany) Max Neukirchner	Team Alstare Suzuki	Report
8	R2	San Marino	Misano Adriatico	29 June	(Australia) Troy Corser	(Australia) Troy Corser	(Spain) Rubén Xaus	Sterilgarda Go Eleven	Report
9	R1	Czech Republic	Brno	20 July	(Australia) Troy Bayliss	(Australia) Troy Bayliss	(Australia) Troy Bayliss	Ducati Xerox Team	Report
9	R2	Czech Republic	Brno	20 July	(Australia) Troy Bayliss	(Italy) Michel Fabrizio	(Australia) Troy Bayliss	Ducati Xerox Team	Report
10	R1	(United Kingdom) Great Britain	Brands Hatch	3 August	(Australia) Troy Bayliss	(Japan) Ryuichi Kiyonari	(Japan) Ryuichi Kiyonari	Hannspree Ten Kate Honda	Report
10	R2	(United Kingdom) Great Britain	Brands Hatch	3 August	(Australia) Troy Bayliss	(Italy) Michel Fabrizio	(Japan) Ryuichi Kiyonari	Hannspree Ten Kate Honda	Report
11	R1	Europe	Donington Park	7 September	(Australia) Troy Bayliss	(Australia) Troy Bayliss	(Australia) Troy Bayliss	Ducati Xerox Team	Report
11	R2	Europe	Donington Park	7 September	(Australia) Troy Bayliss	(United Kingdom) James Ellison	(Japan) Ryuichi Kiyonari	Hannspree Ten Kate Honda	Report
12	R1	Italy	Vallelunga	21 September	(Australia) Troy Bayliss	(Spain) Carlos Checa	(Japan) Noriyuki Haga	Yamaha Motor Italia WSB	Report
12	R2	Italy	Vallelunga	21 September	(Australia) Troy Bayliss	(Australia) Troy Corser	(Japan) Noriyuki Haga	Yamaha Motor Italia WSB	Report
13	R1	France	Magny-Cours	5 October	(Japan) Noriyuki Haga	(Spain) Carlos Checa	(Japan) Noriyuki Haga	Yamaha Motor Italia WSB	Report
13	R2	France	Magny-Cours	5 October	(Japan) Noriyuki Haga	(Australia) Troy Bayliss	(Australia) Troy Bayliss	Ducati Xerox Team	Report
14	R1	Portugal	Portimão	2 November	(Australia) Troy Bayliss	(Australia) Troy Bayliss	(Australia) Troy Bayliss	Ducati Xerox Team	Report
14	R2	Portugal	Portimão	2 November	(Australia) Troy Bayliss	(Australia) Troy Bayliss	(Australia) Troy Bayliss	Ducati Xerox Team	Report

== Entry list ==
2008 entry list
Team	Constructor	Motorcycle	No.	Rider	Rounds
(Italy) Sterilgarda Go Eleven	Ducati	Ducati 1098 RS 08	3	(Italy) Max Biaggi	All
(Italy) Sterilgarda Go Eleven	Ducati	Ducati 1098 RS 08	111	(Spain) Rubén Xaus	All
(Netherlands) Hannspree Ten Kate Honda (Netherlands) Hannspree Ten Kate Honda Jr.	Honda	Honda CBR1000RR	7	(Spain) Carlos Checa	All
(Netherlands) Hannspree Ten Kate Honda (Netherlands) Hannspree Ten Kate Honda Jr.	Honda	Honda CBR1000RR	23	(Japan) Ryuichi Kiyonari	1–12, 14
(Netherlands) Hannspree Ten Kate Honda (Netherlands) Hannspree Ten Kate Honda Jr.	Honda	Honda CBR1000RR	32	(Austria) Martin Bauer	13
(Netherlands) Hannspree Ten Kate Honda (Netherlands) Hannspree Ten Kate Honda Jr.	Honda	Honda CBR1000RR	54	(Turkey) Kenan Sofuoğlu	1–13
(Netherlands) Hannspree Ten Kate Honda (Netherlands) Hannspree Ten Kate Honda Jr.	Honda	Honda CBR1000RR	65	(United Kingdom) Jonathan Rea	14
(United Kingdom) Ventaxia VK Honda	Honda	Honda CBR1000RR	9	(United Kingdom) Chris Walker	10–14
(United Kingdom) Ventaxia VK Honda	Honda	Honda CBR1000RR	36	(Spain) Gregorio Lavilla	All
(Belgium) Team Alstare Suzuki	Suzuki	Suzuki GSX-R1000 K9	10	(Spain) Fonsi Nieto	All
(Belgium) Team Alstare Suzuki	Suzuki	Suzuki GSX-R1000 K9	34	(Japan) Yukio Kagayama	1, 3–14
(Belgium) Team Alstare Suzuki	Suzuki	Suzuki GSX-R1000 K9	76	(Germany) Max Neukirchner	All
(Japan) Yamaha Motor Italia WSB	Yamaha	Yamaha YZF-R1	11	(Australia) Troy Corser	All
(Japan) Yamaha Motor Italia WSB	Yamaha	Yamaha YZF-R1	41	(Japan) Noriyuki Haga	All
(Italy) Team Pedercini	Kawasaki	Kawasaki ZX-10R	13	(Italy) Vittorio Iannuzzo	1–2, 4–14
(Italy) Team Pedercini	Kawasaki	Kawasaki ZX-10R	86	(Italy) Ayrton Badovini	All
(Portugal) Benimoto Suzuki Cetelem	Suzuki	Suzuki GSX-R1000 K8	14	(Portugal) Luís Carreira	14
(Czech Republic) ProRace	Suzuki	Suzuki GSX-R1000 K8	15	(Czech Republic) Miloš Čihák	9
(Germany) Team Suzuki Motorrad	Suzuki	Suzuki GSX-R1000	16	(Spain) Sergio Fuertes	3
(United Kingdom) Lloyds British	Yamaha	Yamaha YZF-R1	17	(United Kingdom) Simon Andrews	(Note: Simon Andrews was entered into the Brands Hatch round but was replaced by Tristan Palmer after the first practice session due to injury.)
(United Kingdom) Lloyds British	Yamaha	Yamaha YZF-R1	17	(United Kingdom) Tristan Palmer	10
(United Kingdom) Team NB	Suzuki	Suzuki GSX-R1000 K8	18	(United Kingdom) Tommy Bridewell	14
(Italy) Ducati Xerox Team	Ducati	Ducati 1098 F08	21	(Australia) Troy Bayliss	All
(Italy) Ducati Xerox Team	Ducati	Ducati 1098 F08	59	(Italy) Niccolò Canepa	9
(Italy) Ducati Xerox Team	Ducati	Ducati 1098 F08	84	(Italy) Michel Fabrizio	All
(United Kingdom) Alto Evolution Honda Superbike	Honda	Honda CBR1000RR	22	(Italy) Luca Morelli	1–5
(United Kingdom) Alto Evolution Honda Superbike	Honda	Honda CBR1000RR	43	(United States) Jason Pridmore	6–10
(United Kingdom) Alto Evolution Honda Superbike	Honda	Honda CBR1000RR	50	(United States) Matt Lynn	11–12
(United Kingdom) Alto Evolution Honda Superbike	Honda	Honda CBR1000RR	88	(Japan) Shuhei Aoyama	All
(Italy) D.F. Racing	Honda	Honda CBR1000RR	22	(Italy) Luca Morelli	8, 10–11
(Italy) D.F. Racing	Honda	Honda CBR1000RR	31	(Australia) Karl Muggeridge	All
(Italy) D.F. Racing	Honda	Honda CBR1000RR	69	(Spain) Iván Silva	13
(Italy) D.F. Racing	Honda	Honda CBR1000RR	83	(Australia) Russell Holland	1–7
(Italy) D.F. Racing	Honda	Honda CBR1000RR	99	(Italy) Luca Scassa	14
(Italy) D.F. Racing	Honda	Honda CBR1000RR	113	(Czech Republic) Jiří Dražďák	9
(Italy) D.F. Racing	Honda	Honda CBR1000RR	122	(Czech Republic) Matěj Smrž	12
(Netherlands) Fabricom – MCT Racing	Ducati	Ducati 1098 RS 08	28	(Netherlands) Arie Vos	4
(United Kingdom) HM Plant Honda	Honda	Honda CBR1000RR	35	(United Kingdom) Cal Crutchlow	11, 14
(United Kingdom) HM Plant Honda	Honda	Honda CBR1000RR	91	(United Kingdom) Leon Haslam	11, 14
(United Kingdom) Honda Joe Darcey	Honda	Honda CBR1000RR	37	(Spain) Diego Lozano Ortiz	3
(Japan) YZF Yamaha	Yamaha	Yamaha YZF-R1	38	(Japan) Shinichi Nakatomi	All
(Italy) HANNspree Honda Althea	Honda	Honda CBR1000RR	44	(Italy) Roberto Rolfo	1–4, 6–14
(Italy) HANNspree Honda Althea	Honda	Honda CBR1000RR	200	(Italy) Giovanni Bussei	5
Yamaha France GMT 94 IPONE	Yamaha	Yamaha YZF-R1	49	(United States) Michael Beck	5
Yamaha France GMT 94 IPONE	Yamaha	Yamaha YZF-R1	94	(Spain) David Checa	1–4, 6–14
Yamaha France GMT 94 IPONE	Yamaha	Yamaha YZF-R1	194	(France) Sébastien Gimbert	All
(San Marino) PSG-1 Corse	Kawasaki	Kawasaki ZX-10R	55	(France) Régis Laconi	All
(San Marino) PSG-1 Corse	Kawasaki	Kawasaki ZX-10R	100	(Japan) Makoto Tamada	All
(Italy) R.G. Team	Ducati	Ducati 1098 RS 08	57	(Italy) Lorenzo Lanzi	1–13
(United States) On The Throttle.TV	Suzuki	Suzuki GSX-R1000 K8	61	(United States) Scott Jensen	6
(Italy) Grillini PBR Team	Yamaha	Yamaha YZF-R1	64	(Italy) Norino Brignola	8
(Italy) Grillini PBR Team	Yamaha	Yamaha YZF-R1	73	(Austria) Christian Zaiser	9–14
(Italy) Grillini PBR Team	Yamaha	Yamaha YZF-R1	77	(France) Loïc Napoleone	1–7
(United Kingdom) Rizla Suzuki	Suzuki	Suzuki GSX-R1000	66	(United Kingdom) Tom Sykes	10–11
(United Kingdom) Hydrex Bike Animal Honda	Honda	Honda CBR1000RR	80	(United Kingdom) James Ellison	11
(Italy) Guandalini Racing by Grifo's	Ducati	Ducati 1098 RS 08	96	(Czech Republic) Jakub Smrž	All
(Italy) Spring Ducati ASD	Ducati	Ducati 999 RS	110	(Italy) Lorenzo Mauri	5
(Spain) L'Oreal Men Expert Laglisse	Yamaha	Yamaha YZF-R1	131	(Spain) Carmelo Morales	3

Key
Regular rider
Wildcard rider
Replacement rider

== Championship standings ==
=== Riders' standings ===
2008 final riders' standings
Pos.	Rider	Bike	QAT (Qatar)		AUS (Australia)		ESP (Spain)		NED (Netherlands)		ITA (Italy)		USA (United States)		GER (Germany)		SMR (San Marino)		CZE (Czech Republic)		GBR (United Kingdom)		EUR (European Union)		ITA (Italy)		FRA (France)		POR (Portugal)		Pts
Pos.	Rider	Bike	R1	R2	R1	R2	R1	R2	R1	R2	R1	R2	R1	R2	R1	R2	R1	R2	R1	R2	R1	R2	R1	R2	R1	R2	R1	R2	R1	R2	Pts
1	(Australia) Troy Bayliss	Ducati	1	4	**1**	**1**	2	2	**1**	**1**	**3**	**Ret**	Ret	22	2	4	3	3	**1**	**1**	**2**	**11**	**1**	**Ret**	**6**	**16**	3	1	**1**	**1**	460
2	(Australia) Troy Corser	Yamaha	**3**	**7**	2	Ret	3	5	5	10	12	8	2	Ret	4	2	**2**	**5**	2	4	8	3	Ret	3	3	3	6	3	3	6	342
3	(Japan) Noriyuki Haga	Yamaha	14	13	8	7	Ret	1	Ret	2	2	1	Ret	6	1	1	10	4	6	7	19	2	Ret	DSQ	1	1	**1**	**2**	Ret	14	327
4	(Spain) Carlos Checa	Honda	6	11	6	2	5	3	2	3	8	Ret	**1**	**1**	5	5	5	8	8	Ret	6	8	Ret	9	5	5	7	4	2	7	313
5	(Germany) Max Neukirchner	Suzuki	5	8	7	5	**Ret**	**DNS**	3	5	1	2	4	2	**3**	**3**	1	7	7	5	7	4	Ret	14	4	4	5	9	Ret	4	311
6	(Spain) Fonsi Nieto	Suzuki	7	1	5	3	4	10	Ret	11	7	4	5	8	8	9	12	10	14	8	5	5	7	Ret	12	6	2	8	5	5	256
7	(Italy) Max Biaggi	Ducati	2	3	Ret	Ret	16	8	10	12	5	Ret	9	4	13	7	Ret	2	4	3	3	12	3	6	2	Ret	4	6	Ret	13	238
8	(Italy) Michel Fabrizio	Ducati	9	5	3	19	Ret	13	Ret	Ret	9	5	3	3	7	6	Ret	11	3	2	12	6	Ret	5	7	2	Ret	14	Ret	2	223
9	(Japan) Ryuichi Kiyonari	Honda	22	19	9	6	Ret	4	7	Ret	6	3	10	7	12	11	14	13	5	6	1	1	Ret	1	Ret	13			8	11	206
10	(Spain) Rubén Xaus	Ducati	4	2	4	4	Ret	7	16	4	Ret	7	14	Ret	6	8	4	1	Ret	Ret	DNS	DNS	Ret	8	Ret	12	Ret	5	9	Ret	178
11	(Japan) Yukio Kagayama	Suzuki	8	Ret			Ret	6	4	6	4	Ret	8	5	DNS	DNS	11	12	9	9	4	25	5	19	9	7	8	7	15	23	154
12	(Spain) Gregorio Lavilla	Honda	13	14	11	8	7	11	9	7	11	10	13	15	Ret	14	8	14	15	14	14	13	4	7	14	Ret	10	12	6	8	135
13	(Czech Republic) Jakub Smrž	Ducati	10	9	Ret	18	14	14	6	8	10	Ret	6	DSQ	11	Ret	7	9	Ret	11	9	9	6	12	13	11	Ret	13	Ret	12	120
14	(Italy) Lorenzo Lanzi	Ducati	16	6	13	20	1	12	DNS	DNS	14	11	11	10	Ret	20	6	6	Ret	13	11	10	Ret	11	11	18	Ret	11			109
15	(Australia) Karl Muggeridge	Honda	17	20	12	10	6	20	14	13	Ret	6	7	11	10	12	Ret	Ret	11	Ret	16	Ret	9	Ret	Ret	Ret	12	Ret	14	21	77
16	(France) Régis Laconi	Kawasaki	15	16	Ret	17	8	9	11	16	Ret	Ret	Ret	9	14	10	Ret	Ret	Ret	Ret	Ret	16	Ret	15	16	9	11	20	10	10	61
17	(Italy) Roberto Rolfo	Honda	11	15	10	16	10	17	22	14			20	16	16	17	17	18	Ret	12	10	14	Ret	13	8	10	Ret	10	12	18	59
18	(Turkey) Kenan Sofuoğlu	Honda	12	10	14	11	12	15	12	19	DNS	DNS	12	14	Ret	21	18	Ret	10	10	13	17	Ret	DNS	Ret	Ret	9	19			54
19	(Japan) Shinichi Nakatomi	Yamaha	21	Ret	15	15	11	16	15	15	13	12	16	Ret	18	18	9	15	12	15	DNS	DNS	13	18	10	8	14	16	13	17	51
20	(Japan) Makoto Tamada	Kawasaki	Ret	12	Ret	14	9	Ret	8	9	Ret	Ret	19	13	9	13	Ret	Ret	16	17	18	18	Ret	16	20	19	18	18	19	24	41
21	(United Kingdom) Tom Sykes	Suzuki																			Ret	7	2	10							35
22	(United Kingdom) Leon Haslam	Honda																					8	Ret					7	3	33
23	(United Kingdom) Cal Crutchlow	Honda																					Ret	2					Ret	9	27
24	(Italy) Ayrton Badovini	Kawasaki	18	17	Ret	21	17	21	13	18	Ret	9	17	12	17	Ret	Ret	17	17	Ret	Ret	21	12	Ret	15	Ret	16	17	11	16	24
25	(United Kingdom) James Ellison	Honda																					10	4							19
26	(United Kingdom) Jonathan Rea	Honda																											4	15	14
27	(Australia) Russell Holland	Honda	24	21	17	9	13	19	18	20	16	13	15	Ret	19	19															14
28	(Spain) David Checa	Yamaha	23	Ret	Ret	12	15	18	Ret	DNS			Ret	DNS	Ret	15	15	16	Ret	16	17	20	11	Ret	17	20	Ret	Ret	20	22	12
29	(France) Sébastien Gimbert	Yamaha	20	18	16	13	Ret	DNS	17	17	15	14	18	17	15	16	16	Ret	Ret	Ret	Ret	19	Ret	Ret	Ret	14	13	Ret	16	20	12
30	(Japan) Shuhei Aoyama	Honda	25	22	18	Ret	Ret	24	19	21	18	16	Ret	Ret	Ret	24	13	19	18	18	Ret	22	14	17	19	17	19	22	18	26	5
31	(United Kingdom) Chris Walker	Honda																			15	15	Ret	Ret	18	15	15	15	17	19	5
32	(Italy) Niccolò Canepa	Ducati																	13	Ret											3
33	(United States) Michael Beck	Yamaha									19	15																			1
	(Italy) Luca Morelli	Honda	Ret	Ret	DNS	DNS	18	23	Ret	Ret	17	Ret					WD	WD			21	24	Ret	Ret							0
	(Austria) Martin Bauer	Honda																									17	Ret			0
	(United States) Jason Pridmore	Honda											21	18	Ret	23	Ret	Ret	19	19	22	23									0
	(Italy) Vittorio Iannuzzo	Kawasaki	19	Ret	DNS	DNS			DNS	DNS	Ret	Ret	22	19	20	Ret	Ret	Ret	Ret	Ret	20	Ret	Ret	Ret	Ret	Ret	Ret	23	Ret	Ret	0
	(Spain) Diego Lozano Ortiz	Honda					19	22																							0
	(France) Loïc Napoleone	Yamaha	Ret	Ret	Ret	Ret	20	Ret	21	22	Ret	Ret	24	21	Ret	22															0
	(Austria) Christian Zaiser	Yamaha																	21	20	23	Ret	Ret	Ret	Ret	Ret	Ret	Ret	Ret	29	0
	(Spain) Iván Silva	Honda																									20	21			0
	(United States) Scott Jensen	Suzuki											20	23																	0
	(Netherlands) Arie Vos	Ducati							20	23																					0
	(Czech Republic) Jiří Dražďák	Honda																	20	Ret											0
	(Czech Republic) Matěj Smrž	Honda																							21	21					0
	(Portugal) Luís Carreira	Suzuki																											21	28	0
	(Czech Republic) Miloš Čihák	Suzuki																	Ret	21											0
	(United States) Matt Lynn	Honda																					Ret	Ret	22	22					0
	(United Kingdom) Tommy Bridewell	Suzuki																											Ret	25	0
	(Spain) Carmelo Morales	Yamaha					Ret	25																							0
	(Italy) Luca Scassa	Honda																											Ret	27	0
	(United Kingdom) Tristan Palmer	Yamaha																			Ret	Ret									0
	(Italy) Lorenzo Mauri	Ducati									Ret	DNS																			0
	(Spain) Sergio Fuertes	Suzuki					Ret	DNS																							0
	(Italy) Norino Brignola	Yamaha															DNS	DNS													0
	(Italy) Giovanni Bussei	Honda									DNS	DNS																			0
	(United Kingdom) Simon Andrews	Yamaha																			WD	WD									0
Pos.	Rider	Bike	QAT (Qatar)		AUS (Australia)		ESP (Spain)		NED (Netherlands)		ITA (Italy)		USA (United States)		GER (Germany)		SMR (San Marino)		CZE (Czech Republic)		GBR (United Kingdom)		EUR (European Union)		ITA (Italy)		FRA (France)		POR (Portugal)		Pts

Colour	Result
Gold	Winner
Silver	Second place
Bronze	Third place
Green	Points classification
Blue	Non-points classification
Blue	Non-classified finish (NC)
Purple	Retired, not classified (Ret)
Red	Did not qualify (DNQ)
Red	Did not pre-qualify (DNPQ)
Black	Disqualified (DSQ)
White	Did not start (DNS)
White	Withdrew (WD)
White	Race cancelled (C)
Blank	Did not practice (DNP)
Blank	Did not arrive (DNA)
Blank	Excluded (EX)

**Bold** – Pole position
Italics – Fastest lap

=== Teams' standings ===
Pos.	Team	Bike No.	QAT (Qatar)		AUS (Australia)		ESP (Spain)		NED (Netherlands)		ITA (Italy)		USA (United States)		GER (Germany)		SMR (San Marino)		CZE (Czech Republic)		GBR (United Kingdom)		EUR (European Union)		ITA (Italy)		FRA (France)		POR (Portugal)		Pts.
Pos.	Team	Bike No.	R1	R2	R1	R2	R1	R2	R1	R2	R1	R2	R1	R2	R1	R2	R1	R2	R1	R2	R1	R2	R1	R2	R1	R2	R1	R2	R1	R2	Pts.
1	(Italy) Ducati Xerox Team	21	1	4	**1**	**1**	2	2	**1**	**1**	**3**	**Ret**	Ret	22	2	4	3	3	**1**	**1**	**2**	**11**	**1**	**Ret**	**6**	**16**	3	1	**1**	**1**	683
1	(Italy) Ducati Xerox Team	84	9	5	3	19	Ret	13	Ret	Ret	9	5	3	3	7	6	Ret	11	3	2	12	6	Ret	5	7	2	Ret	14	Ret	2	683
2	(Japan) Yamaha Motor Italia WSB	11	**3**	**7**	2	Ret	3	5	5	10	12	8	2	Ret	4	2	**2**	**5**	2	4	8	3	Ret	3	3	3	6	3	3	6	669
2	(Japan) Yamaha Motor Italia WSB	41	14	13	8	7	Ret	1	Ret	2	2	1	Ret	6	1	1	10	4	6	7	19	2	Ret	DSQ	1	1	**1**	**2**	Ret	14	669
3	(Belgium) Team Alstare Suzuki	10	7	1	5	3	4	10	Ret	11	7	4	5	8	8	9	12	10	14	8	5	5	7	Ret	12	6	2	8	5	5	629
3	(Belgium) Team Alstare Suzuki	34	8	Ret			Ret	6	4	6	4	Ret	8	5	DNS	DNS	11	12	9	9	4	25	5	19	9	7	8	7	15	23	629
3	(Belgium) Team Alstare Suzuki	76	5	8	7	5	**Ret**	**DNS**	3	5	1	2	4	2	**3**	**3**	1	7	7	5	7	4	Ret	14	4	4	5	9	Ret	4	629
4	(Netherlands) Hannspree Ten Kate Honda; Hannspree Ten Kate Honda Jr.	7	6	11	6	2	5	3	2	3	8	Ret	**1**	**1**	5	5	5	8	8	Ret	6	8	Ret	9	5	5	7	4	2	7	567
4	(Netherlands) Hannspree Ten Kate Honda; Hannspree Ten Kate Honda Jr.	23	22	19	9	6	Ret	4	7	Ret	6	3	10	7	12	11	14	13	5	6	1	1	Ret	1	Ret	13			8	11	567
4	(Netherlands) Hannspree Ten Kate Honda; Hannspree Ten Kate Honda Jr.	32																									17	Ret			567
4	(Netherlands) Hannspree Ten Kate Honda; Hannspree Ten Kate Honda Jr.	54	12	10	14	11	12	15	12	19	DNS	DNS	12	14	Ret	21	18	Ret	10	10	13	17	Ret	DNS	Ret	Ret	9	19			567
4	(Netherlands) Hannspree Ten Kate Honda; Hannspree Ten Kate Honda Jr.	65																											4	15	567
5	(Italy) Sterilgarda Go Eleven	3	2	3	Ret	Ret	16	8	10	12	5	Ret	9	4	13	7	Ret	2	4	3	3	12	3	6	2	Ret	4	6	Ret	13	416
5	(Italy) Sterilgarda Go Eleven	111	4	2	4	4	Ret	7	16	4	Ret	7	14	Ret	6	8	4	1	Ret	Ret	DNS	DNS	Ret	8	Ret	12	Ret	5	9	Ret	416
6	(United Kingdom) Ventaxia VK Honda	36	13	14	11	8	7	11	9	7	11	10	13	15	Ret	14	8	14	15	14	14	13	4	7	14	Ret	10	12	6	8	135
7	(Italy) Guandalini Racing by Grifo's	96	10	9	Ret	18	14	14	6	8	10	Ret	6	DSQ	11	Ret	7	9	Ret	11	9	9	6	12	13	11	Ret	13	Ret	12	120
8	(Italy) R.G. Team	57	16	6	13	20	1	12	DNS	DNS	14	11	11	10	Ret	20	6	6	Ret	13	11	10	Ret	11	11	18	Ret	11			109
9	(San Marino) PSG-1 Corse	55	15	16	Ret	17	8	9	11	16	Ret	Ret	Ret	9	14	10	Ret	Ret	Ret	Ret	Ret	16	Ret	15	16	9	11	20	10	10	102
9	(San Marino) PSG-1 Corse	100	Ret	12	Ret	14	9	Ret	8	9	Ret	Ret	19	13	9	13	Ret	Ret	16	17	18	18	Ret	16	20	19	18	18	19	24	102
10	(Italy) D.F. Racing	22															WD	WD			21	24	Ret	Ret							91
10	(Italy) D.F. Racing	31	17	20	12	10	6	20	14	13	Ret	6	7	11	10	12	Ret	Ret	11	Ret	16	Ret	9	Ret	Ret	Ret	12	Ret	14	21	91
10	(Italy) D.F. Racing	69																									20	21			91
10	(Italy) D.F. Racing	83	24	21	17	9	13	19	18	20	16	13	15	Ret	19	19															91
10	(Italy) D.F. Racing	99																											Ret	27	91
10	(Italy) D.F. Racing	113																	20	Ret											91
10	(Italy) D.F. Racing	122																							21	21					91
11	(Italy) HANNspree Honda Althea	44	11	15	10	16	10	17	22	14			20	16	16	17	17	18	Ret	12	10	14	Ret	13	8	10	Ret	10	12	18	59
11	(Italy) HANNspree Honda Althea	200									DNS	DNS																			59
12	(Japan) YZF Yamaha	38	21	Ret	15	15	11	16	15	15	13	12	16	Ret	18	18	9	15	12	15	DNS	DNS	13	18	10	8	14	16	13	17	51
13	Yamaha France GMT 94 IPONE	49									19	15																			25
13	Yamaha France GMT 94 IPONE	94	23	Ret	Ret	12	15	18	Ret	DNS			Ret	DNS	Ret	15	15	16	Ret	16	17	20	11	Ret	17	20	Ret	Ret	20	22	25
13	Yamaha France GMT 94 IPONE	194	20	18	16	13	Ret	DNS	17	17	15	14	18	17	15	16	16	Ret	Ret	Ret	Ret	19	Ret	Ret	Ret	14	13	Ret	16	20	25
14	(Italy) Team Pedercini	13	19	Ret	DNS	DNS			DNS	DNS	Ret	Ret	22	19	20	Ret	Ret	Ret	Ret	Ret	20	Ret	Ret	Ret	Ret	Ret	Ret	23	Ret	Ret	24
14	(Italy) Team Pedercini	86	18	17	Ret	21	17	21	13	18	Ret	9	17	12	17	Ret	Ret	17	17	Ret	Ret	21	12	Ret	15	Ret	16	17	11	16	24
15	(United Kingdom) Alto Evolution Honda Superbike	22	Ret	Ret	DNS	DNS	18	23	Ret	Ret	17	Ret																			5
15	(United Kingdom) Alto Evolution Honda Superbike	43											21	18	Ret	23	Ret	Ret	19	19	22	23									5
15	(United Kingdom) Alto Evolution Honda Superbike	50																					Ret	Ret	22	22					5
15	(United Kingdom) Alto Evolution Honda Superbike	88	25	22	18	Ret	Ret	24	19	21	18	16	Ret	Ret	Ret	24	13	19	18	18	Ret	22	14	17	19	17	19	22	18	26	5
16	(Italy) Grillini PBR Team	64															DNS	DNS													0
16	(Italy) Grillini PBR Team	73																	21	20	23	Ret	Ret	Ret	Ret	Ret	Ret	Ret	Ret	29	0
16	(Italy) Grillini PBR Team	77	Ret	Ret	Ret	Ret	20	Ret	21	22	Ret	Ret	24	21	Ret	22															0
Pos.	Team	Bike No.	QAT (Qatar)		AUS (Australia)		ESP (Spain)		NED (Netherlands)		ITA (Italy)		USA (United States)		GER (Germany)		SMR (San Marino)		CZE (Czech Republic)		GBR (United Kingdom)		EUR (European Union)		ITA (Italy)		FRA (France)		POR (Portugal)		Pts.

=== Manufacturers' standings ===
2008 final manufacturers' standings
Pos.	Manufacturer	QAT (Qatar)		AUS (Australia)		ESP (Spain)		NED (Netherlands)		ITA (Italy)		USA (United States)		GER (Germany)		SMR (San Marino)		CZE (Czech Republic)		GBR (United Kingdom)		EUR (European Union)		ITA (Italy)		FRA (France)		POR (Portugal)		Pts
Pos.	Manufacturer	R1	R2	R1	R2	R1	R2	R1	R2	R1	R2	R1	R2	R1	R2	R1	R2	R1	R2	R1	R2	R1	R2	R1	R2	R1	R2	R1	R2	Pts
1	(Italy) Ducati	1	2	1	1	1	2	1	1	3	5	3	3	2	4	3	1	1	1	2	6	1	5	2	2	3	1	1	1	570
2	(Japan) Yamaha	3	7	2	7	3	1	5	2	2	1	2	6	1	1	2	4	2	4	8	2	11	3	1	1	1	2	3	6	487
3	(Japan) Honda	6	10	6	2	5	3	2	3	6	3	1	1	5	5	5	8	5	6	1	1	4	1	5	5	7	4	2	3	415
4	(Japan) Suzuki	5	1	5	3	4	6	3	5	1	2	4	2	3	3	1	7	7	5	4	4	2	10	4	4	2	7	5	4	408
5	(Japan) Kawasaki	15	12	Ret	14	8	9	8	9	Ret	9	17	9	9	10	Ret	17	16	17	18	16	12	15	15	9	11	17	10	10	94
Pos.	Manufacturer	QAT (Qatar)		AUS (Australia)		ESP (Spain)		NED (Netherlands)		ITA (Italy)		USA (United States)		GER (Germany)		SMR (San Marino)		CZE (Czech Republic)		GBR (United Kingdom)		EUR (European Union)		ITA (Italy)		FRA (France)		POR (Portugal)		Pts
