= 2008 Phillip Island Superbike World Championship round =

(Australia) 2008 Australian Superbike World Championship round
Round details
- Round 2 of 14 rounds in the 2008 Superbike World Championship. and Round 2 of 13 rounds in the 2008 Supersport World Championship.
- Date: 2 March, 2008
- Location: Phillip Island
- Course: Permanent racing facility 4.445 km (2.762 mi)

Superbike World Championship
Pole position
(Australia) Troy Bayliss
1:31.493
| Fastest lap race 1 | Fastest lap race 2 |
| (Australia) Troy Bayliss | (Italy) Max Biaggi |
| 1:32.516 | 1:32.477 |

Supersport World Championship
Pole position
(Australia) Andrew Pitt
1:34.592
Fastest lap
(Denmark) Robbin Harms
1:35.429

The 2008 Phillip Island Superbike World Championship round was the 2nd round of the 2008 Superbike World Championship season. It took place on the weekend of 29 February – 2 March 2008, at the Phillip Island Grand Prix Circuit near Cowes, Victoria, Australia.

== Superbike race 1 classification ==
| Pos | No | Rider | Bike | Laps | Time | Grid | Points |
|---|---|---|---|---|---|---|---|
| 1 | 21 | (Australia) Troy Bayliss | Ducati 1098 F08 | 22 | 34:22.933 | 1 | 25 |
| 2 | 11 | (Australia) Troy Corser | Yamaha YZF-R1 | 22 | +4.221 | 2 | 20 |
| 3 | 84 | (Italy) Michel Fabrizio | Ducati 1098 F08 | 22 | +4.738 | 3 | 16 |
| 4 | 111 | (Spain) Rubén Xaus | Ducati 1098 RS 08 | 22 | +5.171 | 11 | 13 |
| 5 | 10 | (Spain) Fonsi Nieto | Suzuki GSX-R1000 | 22 | +5.543 | 5 | 11 |
| 6 | 7 | (Spain) Carlos Checa | Honda CBR1000RR | 22 | +5.895 | 4 | 10 |
| 7 | 76 | (Germany) Max Neukirchner | Suzuki GSX-R1000 | 22 | +5.964 | 8 | 9 |
| 8 | 41 | (Japan) Noriyuki Haga | Yamaha YZF-R1 | 22 | +14.826 | 7 | 8 |
| 9 | 23 | (Japan) Ryuichi Kiyonari | Honda CBR1000RR | 22 | +18.899 | 19 | 7 |
| 10 | 44 | (Italy) Roberto Rolfo | Honda CBR1000RR | 22 | +20.633 | 13 | 6 |
| 11 | 36 | (Spain) Gregorio Lavilla | Honda CBR1000RR | 22 | +21.601 | 14 | 5 |
| 12 | 31 | (Australia) Karl Muggeridge | Honda CBR1000RR | 22 | +29.281 | 12 | 4 |
| 13 | 57 | (Italy) Lorenzo Lanzi | Ducati 1098 RS 08 | 22 | +29.500 | 17 | 3 |
| 14 | 54 | (Turkey) Kenan Sofuoğlu | Honda CBR1000RR | 22 | +30.030 | 21 | 2 |
| 15 | 38 | (Japan) Shinichi Nakatomi | Yamaha YZF-R1 | 22 | +30.223 | 22 | 1 |
| 16 | 194 | (France) Sébastien Gimbert | Yamaha YZF-R1 | 22 | +30.800 | 20 | |
| 17 | 83 | (Australia) Russell Holland | Honda CBR1000RR | 22 | +50.107 | 9 | |
| 18 | 88 | (Japan) Shuhei Aoyama | Honda CBR1000RR | 22 | +1:07.385 | 24 | |
| Ret | 3 | (Italy) Max Biaggi | Ducati 1098 RS 08 | 15 | Accident | 16 | |
| Ret | 100 | (Japan) Makoto Tamada | Kawasaki ZX-10R | 12 | Retirement | 18 | |
| Ret | 86 | (Italy) Ayrton Badovini | Kawasaki ZX-10R | 9 | Retirement | 25 | |
| Ret | 77 | (France) Loïc Napoleone | Yamaha YZF-R1 | 7 | Retirement | 27 | |
| Ret | 55 | (France) Régis Laconi | Kawasaki ZX-10R | 6 | Retirement | 10 | |
| Ret | 96 | (Czech Republic) Jakub Smrž | Ducati 1098 RS 08 | 2 | Accident | 6 | |
| Ret | 94 | (Spain) David Checa | Yamaha YZF-R1 | 0 | Retirement | 15 | |
| DNS | 22 | (Italy) Luca Morelli | Honda CBR1000RR | | Not started | 26 | |
| DNS | 13 | (Italy) Vittorio Iannuzzo | Kawasaki ZX-10R | | Not started | 23 | |

== Superbike race 2 classification ==
| Pos | No | Rider | Bike | Laps | Time | Grid | Points |
|---|---|---|---|---|---|---|---|
| 1 | 21 | (Australia) Troy Bayliss | Ducati 1098 F08 | 22 | 34:35.284 | 1 | 25 |
| 2 | 7 | (Spain) Carlos Checa | Honda CBR1000RR | 22 | +1.127 | 4 | 20 |
| 3 | 10 | (Spain) Fonsi Nieto | Suzuki GSX-R1000 | 22 | +4.395 | 5 | 16 |
| 4 | 111 | (Spain) Rubén Xaus | Ducati 1098 RS 08 | 22 | +6.621 | 11 | 13 |
| 5 | 76 | (Germany) Max Neukirchner | Suzuki GSX-R1000 | 22 | +11.550 | 8 | 11 |
| 6 | 23 | (Japan) Ryuichi Kiyonari | Honda CBR1000RR | 22 | +11.620 | 19 | 10 |
| 7 | 41 | (Japan) Noriyuki Haga | Yamaha YZF-R1 | 22 | +12.049 | 7 | 9 |
| 8 | 36 | (Spain) Gregorio Lavilla | Honda CBR1000RR | 22 | +12.134 | 14 | 8 |
| 9 | 83 | (Australia) Russell Holland | Honda CBR1000RR | 22 | +13.462 | 9 | 7 |
| 10 | 31 | (Australia) Karl Muggeridge | Honda CBR1000RR | 22 | +15.519 | 12 | 6 |
| 11 | 54 | (Turkey) Kenan Sofuoğlu | Honda CBR1000RR | 22 | +16.225 | 21 | 5 |
| 12 | 94 | (Spain) David Checa | Yamaha YZF-R1 | 22 | +21.959 | 15 | 4 |
| 13 | 194 | (France) Sébastien Gimbert | Yamaha YZF-R1 | 22 | +21.989 | 20 | 3 |
| 14 | 100 | (Japan) Makoto Tamada | Kawasaki ZX-10R | 22 | +29.106 | 18 | 2 |
| 15 | 38 | (Japan) Shinichi Nakatomi | Yamaha YZF-R1 | 22 | +29.219 | 22 | 1 |
| 16 | 44 | (Italy) Roberto Rolfo | Honda CBR1000RR | 22 | +32.994 | 13 | |
| 17 | 55 | (France) Régis Laconi | Kawasaki ZX-10R | 22 | +34.380 | 10 | |
| 18 | 96 | (Czech Republic) Jakub Smrž | Ducati 1098 RS 08 | 22 | +42.537 | 6 | |
| 19 | 84 | (Italy) Michel Fabrizio | Ducati 1098 F08 | 22 | +46.623 | 3 | |
| 20 | 57 | (Italy) Lorenzo Lanzi | Ducati 1098 RS 08 | 22 | +47.030 | 17 | |
| 21 | 86 | (Italy) Ayrton Badovini | Kawasaki ZX-10R | 22 | +1:08.601 | 25 | |
| Ret | 3 | (Italy) Max Biaggi | Ducati 1098 RS 08 | 6 | Accident | 16 | |
| Ret | 11 | (Australia) Troy Corser | Yamaha YZF-R1 | 4 | Accident | 2 | |
| Ret | 88 | (Japan) Shuhei Aoyama | Honda CBR1000RR | 3 | Retirement | 24 | |
| Ret | 77 | (France) Loïc Napoleone | Yamaha YZF-R1 | 3 | Retirement | 27 | |
| DNS | 22 | (Italy) Luca Morelli | Honda CBR1000RR | | Not started | 26 | |
| DNS | 13 | (Italy) Vittorio Iannuzzo | Kawasaki ZX-10R | | Not started | 23 | |

== Supersport race classification ==
| Pos | No | Rider | Bike | Laps | Time | Grid | Points |
|---|---|---|---|---|---|---|---|
| 1 | 88 | (Australia) Andrew Pitt | Honda CBR600RR | 21 | 33:51.257 | 1 | 25 |
| 2 | 25 | (Australia) Josh Brookes | Honda CBR600RR | 21 | +0.062 | 2 | 20 |
| 3 | 127 | (Denmark) Robbin Harms | Honda CBR600RR | 21 | +0.597 | 6 | 16 |
| 4 | 99 | (France) Fabien Foret | Yamaha YZF-R6 | 21 | +0.780 | 4 | 13 |
| 5 | 65 | (United Kingdom) Jonathan Rea | Honda CBR600RR | 21 | +0.976 | 5 | 11 |
| 6 | 24 | (Australia) Garry McCoy | Triumph 675 | 21 | +1.228 | 17 | 10 |
| 7 | 26 | (Spain) Joan Lascorz | Honda CBR600RR | 21 | +6.590 | 7 | 9 |
| 8 | 105 | (Italy) Gianluca Vizziello | Honda CBR600RR | 21 | +10.266 | 9 | 8 |
| 9 | 55 | (Italy) Massimo Roccoli | Yamaha YZF-R6 | 21 | +10.594 | 14 | 7 |
| 10 | 69 | (Italy) Gianluca Nannelli | Honda CBR600RR | 21 | +10.991 | 10 | 6 |
| 11 | 47 | (Italy) Ivan Clementi | Triumph 675 | 21 | +16.068 | 8 | 5 |
| 12 | 8 | (Australia) Mark Aitchison | Triumph 675 | 21 | +16.245 | 13 | 4 |
| 13 | 81 | (United Kingdom) Graeme Gowland | Honda CBR600RR | 21 | +16.355 | 20 | 3 |
| 14 | 9 | (United Kingdom) Chris Walker | Kawasaki ZX-6R | 21 | +16.526 | 16 | 2 |
| 15 | 31 | (Finland) Vesa Kallio | Honda CBR600RR | 21 | +17.270 | 24 | 1 |
| 16 | 18 | (United Kingdom) Craig Jones | Honda CBR600RR | 21 | +17.480 | 12 | |
| 17 | 14 | (France) Matthieu Lagrive | Honda CBR600RR | 21 | +20.948 | 22 | |
| 18 | 44 | (Spain) David Salom | Yamaha YZF-R6 | 21 | +36.396 | 11 | |
| 19 | 4 | (Italy) Lorenzo Alfonsi | Kawasaki ZX-6R | 21 | +45.078 | 28 | |
| 20 | 77 | (Netherlands) Barry Veneman | Suzuki GSX-R600 | 21 | +46.640 | 21 | |
| 21 | 17 | (Portugal) Miguel Praia | Honda CBR600RR | 21 | +52.165 | 29 | |
| 22 | 121 | (France) Arnaud Vincent | Kawasaki ZX-6R | 21 | +57.732 | 34 | |
| 23 | 199 | (Italy) Danilo Dell'Omo | Honda CBR600RR | 21 | +57.879 | 26 | |
| 24 | 15 | (Hungary) Gergő Talmácsi | Honda CBR600RR | 21 | +58.409 | 32 | |
| 25 | 38 | (France) Grégory Leblanc | Honda CBR600RR | 21 | +1:04.267 | 23 | |
| 26 | 75 | (Slovenia) Luka Nedog | Honda CBR600RR | 21 | +1:07.943 | 31 | |
| 27 | 72 | (Hungary) Attila Magda | Honda CBR600RR | 21 | +1:08.158 | 35 | |
| 28 | 32 | (Italy) Mirko Giansanti | Honda CBR600RR | 21 | +1:23.152 | 25 | |
| 29 | 888 | (Spain) Josep Pedro Subirats | Yamaha YZF-R6 | 20 | +1 lap | 36 | |
| 30 | 51 | (Spain) Santiago Barragán | Honda CBR600RR | 18 | +3 laps | 33 | |
| Ret | 57 | (Italy) Ilario Dionisi | Triumph 675 | 7 | Retirement | 27 | |
| Ret | 37 | (San Marino) William de Angelis | Honda CBR600RR | 6 | Retirement | 30 | |
| Ret | 21 | (Japan) Katsuaki Fujiwara | Kawasaki ZX-6R | 2 | Retirement | 15 | |
| Ret | 23 | (Australia) Broc Parkes | Yamaha YZF-R6 | 2 | Retirement | 3 | |
| Ret | 61 | (Italy) Andrea Antonelli | Honda CBR600RR | 1 | Accident | 19 | |
| DNS | 83 | (Belgium) Didier Van Keymeulen | Suzuki GSX-R600 | | Not started | 18 | |
