= 2007 Magny-Cours Superbike World Championship round =

(France) 2007 French Superbike World Championship round
Round details
- Round 13 of 13 rounds in the 2007 Superbike World Championship. and Round 13 of 13 rounds in the 2007 Supersport World Championship.
- Date: October 7, 2007
- Location: Magny-Cours
- Course: Permanent racing facility 4.411 km (2.741 mi)

Superbike World Championship
Pole position
(United Kingdom) James Toseland
1'38.501
Fastest lap race 1	Fastest lap race 2
(Germany) Max Neukirchner	(Italy) Max Biaggi
1'39.844	1'40.040

Supersport World Championship
Pole position
(Turkey) Kenan Sofuoğlu
1'42.057
Fastest lap
(Turkey) Kenan Sofuoğlu
1'42.740

The 2007 Magny-Cours Superbike World Championship round was the final round of the 2007 Superbike World Championship season. It took place on the weekend of October 5–7, 2007, at the 4.411 km Magny-Cours circuit in France.

== Superbike race 1 classification ==
Pos	No	Rider	Bike	Laps	Time	Grid	Points
1	41	(Japan) Noriyuki Haga	Yamaha YZF-R1	23	38:33.762	4	25
2	21	(Australia) Troy Bayliss	Ducati 999 F07	23	+2.770	7	20
3	11	(Australia) Troy Corser	Yamaha YZF-R1	23	+3.735	3	16
4	76	(Germany) Max Neukirchner	Suzuki GSX-R1000 K7	23	+8.570	2	13
5	10	(Spain) Fonsi Nieto	Kawasaki ZX-10R	23	+12.925	9	11
6	3	(Italy) Max Biaggi	Suzuki GSX-R1000 K7	23	+13.283	6	10
7	52	(United Kingdom) James Toseland	Honda CBR1000RR	23	+16.395	1	9
8	111	(Spain) Ruben Xaus	Ducati 999 F06	23	+22.581	10	8
9	55	(France) Régis Laconi	Kawasaki ZX-10R	23	+22.828	8	7
10	44	(Italy) Roberto Rolfo	Honda CBR1000RR	23	+32.729	11	6
11	38	(Japan) Shinichi Nakatomi	Yamaha YZF-R1	23	+38.305	17	5
12	31	(Australia) Karl Muggeridge	Honda CBR1000RR	23	+53.685	16	4
13	32	(France) Yoann Tiberio	Honda CBR1000RR	23	+53.799	14	3
14	84	(Italy) Michel Fabrizio	Honda CBR1000RR	23	+53.915	12	2
15	83	(France) Guillaume Dietrich	Suzuki GSX-R1000 K6	23	+56.474	18	1
16	99	(Australia) Steve Martin	Suzuki GSX-R1000 K6	23	+1:11.402	13	
Ret	22	(Italy) Luca Morelli	Honda CBR1000RR	19	Retirement	19	
Ret	96	(Czech Republic) Jakub Smrž	Ducati 999 F05	4	Retirement	15	
Ret	42	(United Kingdom) Dean Ellison	Ducati 999RS	4	Retirement	20	
Ret	57	(Italy) Lorenzo Lanzi	Ducati 999 F07	0	Retirement	5	

== Superbike race 2 classification ==
Pos	No	Rider	Bike	Laps	Time	Grid	Points
1	41	(Japan) Noriyuki Haga	Yamaha YZF-R1	23	38:35.353	4	25
2	3	(Italy) Max Biaggi	Suzuki GSX-R1000 K7	23	+3.518	6	20
3	10	(Spain) Fonsi Nieto	Kawasaki ZX-10R	23	+9.142	9	16
4	11	(Australia) Troy Corser	Yamaha YZF-R1	23	+9.257	3	13
5	21	(Australia) Troy Bayliss	Ducati 999 F07	23	+12.825	7	11
6	52	(United Kingdom) James Toseland	Honda CBR1000RR	23	+19.316	1	10
7	44	(Italy) Roberto Rolfo	Honda CBR1000RR	23	+20.994	11	9
8	55	(France) Régis Laconi	Kawasaki ZX-10R	23	+22.452	8	8
9	84	(Italy) Michel Fabrizio	Honda CBR1000RR	23	+22.505	12	7
10	111	(Spain) Ruben Xaus	Ducati 999 F06	23	+28.352	10	6
11	31	(Australia) Karl Muggeridge	Honda CBR1000RR	23	+44.333	16	5
12	32	(France) Yoann Tiberio	Honda CBR1000RR	23	+48.077	14	4
13	83	(France) Guillaume Dietrich	Suzuki GSX-R1000 K6	23	+1:23.307	18	3
14	22	(Italy) Luca Morelli	Honda CBR1000RR	23	+1:23.826	19	2
15	42	(United Kingdom) Dean Ellison	Ducati 999RS	23	+1:37.631	20	1
Ret	76	(Germany) Max Neukirchner	Suzuki GSX-R1000 K7	6	Retirement	2	
Ret	38	(Japan) Shinichi Nakatomi	Yamaha YZF-R1	5	Retirement	17	
Ret	99	(Australia) Steve Martin	Suzuki GSX-R1000 K6	1	Retirement	13	
Ret	96	(Czech Republic) Jakub Smrž	Ducati 999 F05	0	Retirement	15	

== Supersport classification ==
Pos	Rider	Bike	Time/Retired	Laps	Points
1	(Turkey) Kenan Sofuoğlu	Honda CBR600RR	37'55.892	22	25
2	(Australia) Broc Parkes	Yamaha YZF-R6	37'58.686	22	20
3	(United Kingdom) Craig Jones	Honda CBR600RR	38'07.027	22	16
4	(Italy) Gianluca Vizziello	Yamaha YZF-R6	38'07.443	22	13
5	(United Kingdom) Tommy Hill	Yamaha YZF-R6	38'08.251	22	11
6	(Spain) David Checa	Yamaha YZF-R6	38'12.365	22	10
7	(Australia) Joshua Brookes	Honda CBR600RR	38'13.753	22	9
8	(Japan) Katsuaki Fujiwara	Honda CBR600RR	38'17.911	22	8
9	(France) Gregory Leblanc	Honda CBR600RR	38'18.432	22	7
10	(Italy) Massimo Roccoli	Yamaha YZF-R6	38'18.532	22	6
11	(France) Sébastien Gimbert	Yamaha YZF-R6	38'19.426	22	5
12	(Germany) Arne Tode	Honda CBR600RR	38'25.372	22	4
13	(Italy) Simone Sanna	Honda CBR600RR	38'35.990	22	3
14	(France) Kenny Foray	Honda CBR600RR	38'36.175	22	2
15	(France) David Perret	Kawasaki ZX-6R	38'38.774	22	1
16	(Germany) Stefan Nebel	Kawasaki ZX-6R	38'39.028	22	
17	(Italy) Lorenzo Alfonsi	Honda CBR600RR	38'50.458	22	
18	(Italy) Gilles Boccolini	Kawasaki ZX-6R	38'53.449	22	
19	(France) Julien Enjolras	Yamaha YZF-R6	38'54.642	22	
20	(United Kingdom) Joe Dickinson	Honda CBR600RR	38'54.803	22	
21	(Finland) Vesa Kallio	Suzuki GSX-R600	38'54.968	22	
22	(Spain) Joan Lascorz	Honda CBR600RR	39'01.495	22	
23	(Netherlands) Barry Veneman	Suzuki GSX-R600	39'11.464	22	
Ret	(Spain) Arturo Tizon	Yamaha YZF-R6	37'07.534	21	
Ret	(Italy) Mauro Sanchini	Honda CBR600RR	37'36.742	21	
Ret	(France) Fabien Foret	Kawasaki ZX-6R	21'17.396	12	
Ret	(France) Sébastien Charpentier	Honda CBR600RR	17'29.943	10	
Ret	(Portugal) Miguel Praia	Honda CBR600RR	15'53.301	9	
Ret	(Spain) David Salom	Yamaha YZF-R6	15'54.533	9	
Ret	(Spain) Javier Fores	Honda CBR600RR	12'29.618	7	
Ret	(Spain) Pere Riba	Kawasaki ZX-6R	7'04.848	4	
Ret	(Sweden) Nicklas Cajback	Honda CBR600RR		0	

== Superstock 1000 race classification ==
Pos	No	Rider	Bike	Laps	Time	Grid	Points
1	86	(Italy) Ayrton Badovini	MV Agusta F4 312 R	12	20:51.999	3	25
2	71	(Italy) Claudio Corti	Yamaha YZF-R1	12	+0.084	2	20
3	59	(Italy) Niccolò Canepa	Ducati 1098S	12	+1.071	1	16
4	312	(Italy) Luca Scassa	MV Agusta F4 312 R	12	+2.416	6	13
5	3	(Australia) Mark Aitchison	Suzuki GSX-R1000 K6	12	+2.591	9	11
6	78	(France) Freddy Foray	Yamaha YZF-R1	12	+3.352	11	10
7	57	(Italy) Ilario Dionisi	Suzuki GSX-R1000 K6	12	+3.648	8	9
8	25	(Germany) Dario Giuseppetti	Yamaha YZF-R1	12	+13.925	12	8
9	15	(Italy) Matteo Baiocco	Yamaha YZF-R1	12	+14.175	14	7
10	44	(Austria) René Mähr	Yamaha YZF-R1	12	+14.346	13	6
11	96	(Czech Republic) Matěj Smrž	Honda CBR1000RR	12	+14.542	10	5
12	33	(Estonia) Marko Rohtlaan	Honda CBR1000RR	12	+19.327	19	4
13	72	(United Kingdom) Adam Jenkinson	Suzuki GSX-R1000 K6	12	+22.833	23	3
14	27	(France) Cyril Brivet	Suzuki GSX-R1000 K6	12	+23.348	25	2
15	10	(France) Franck Millet	MV Agusta F4 312 R	12	+24.159	16	1
16	99	(Italy) Danilo Dell'Omo	MV Agusta F4 312 R	12	+24.471	28	
17	34	(Hungary) Balázs Németh	Suzuki GSX-R1000 K6	12	+24.822	18	
18	47	(France) Julien Millet	Yamaha YZF-R1	12	+26.715	22	
19	24	(Slovenia) Marko Jerman	Yamaha YZF-R1	12	+27.283	29	
20	56	(Switzerland) Daniel Sutter	Yamaha YZF-R1	12	+33.746	27	
21	18	(United Kingdom) Matt Bond	Suzuki GSX-R1000 K6	12	+35.858	33	
22	76	(Italy) Diego Ciavattini	Yamaha YZF-R1	12	+36.176	32	
23	134	(South Africa) Greg Gildenhuys	Ducati 1098S	12	+36.330	31	
24	37	(Italy) Raffaele Filice	Suzuki GSX-R1000 K6	12	+36.760	35	
25	14	(Italy) Lorenzo Baroni	Ducati 1098S	12	+40.919	36	
26	75	(Slovenia) Luka Nedog	Ducati 1098S	12	+41.006	30	
27	21	(Belgium) Wim Van Den Broeck	Yamaha YZF-R1	12	+44.070	39	
28	13	(Hungary) Victor Kispataki	Suzuki GSX-R1000 K6	12	+44.501	34	
29	77	(United Kingdom) Barry Burrell	Honda CBR1000RR	12	+1:38.210	21	
Ret	83	(Belgium) Didier Van Keymeulen	Yamaha YZF-R1	11	Accident	4	
Ret	42	(Germany) Leonardo Biliotti	MV Agusta F4 312 R	11	Retirement	37	
Ret	32	(South Africa) Sheridan Morais	Ducati 1098S	7	Retirement	15	
Ret	29	(Italy) Niccolò Rosso	MV Agusta F4 312 R	6	Retirement	40	
Ret	155	(Australia) Brendan Roberts	Ducati 1098S	5	Retirement	7	
Ret	23	(France) Cédric Tangre	Suzuki GSX-R1000 K6	4	Technical problem	17	
Ret	11	(Italy) Denis Sacchetti	MV Agusta F4 312 R	2	Technical problem	38	
Ret	19	(Belgium) Xavier Simeon	Suzuki GSX-R1000 K6	1	Retirement	5	
Ret	16	(Netherlands) Raymond Schouten	Yamaha YZF-R1	0	Retirement	24	
DNS	88	(Germany) Timo Gieseler	Yamaha YZF-R1	0	Did not start	26	
DNS	51	(Italy) Michele Pirro	Yamaha YZF-R1	0	Did not start	20	
DNQ	58	(Italy) Robert Gianfardoni	Yamaha YZF-R1		Did not qualify		

=== STK600 race classification ===
Pos.	No.	Rider	Bike	Laps	Time/Retired	Grid	Points
1	21	(France) Maxime Berger	Yamaha YZF-R6	10	17:40.422	1	25
2	8	(Italy) Andrea Antonelli	Honda CBR600RR	10	+2.522	3	20
3	199	(United Kingdom) Gregg Black	Yamaha YZF-R6	10	+7.775	4	16
4	119	(Italy) Michele Magnoni	Yamaha YZF-R6	10	+12.461	7	13
5	99	(Netherlands) Roy Ten Napel	Yamaha YZF-R6	10	+12.617	10	11
6	20	(France) Sylvain Barrier	Yamaha YZF-R6	10	+12.670	5	10
7	30	(Switzerland) Michaël Savary	Yamaha YZF-R6	10	+12.970	11	9
8	24	(Italy) Daniele Beretta	Suzuki GSX-R600	10	+13.970	12	8
9	55	(Belgium) Vincent Lonbois	Suzuki GSX-R600	10	+14.396	17	7
10	172	(France) Nicolas Pouhair	Yamaha YZF-R6	10	+15.118	8	6
11	81	(Czech Republic) Patrik Vostárek	Honda CBR600RR	10	+15.449	6	5
12	189	(France) Axel Maurin	Kawasaki ZX-6R	10	+19.413	18	4
13	44	(United Kingdom) Gino Rea	Suzuki GSX-R600	10	+19.734	16	3
14	111	(Czech Republic) Michal Šembera	Honda CBR600RR	10	+27.240	21	2
15	27	(South Africa) Chris Leeson	Suzuki GSX-R600	10	+27.919	19	1
16	28	(Spain) Yannick Guerra	Yamaha YZF-R6	10	+28.949	14	
17	7	(Italy) Renato Costantini	Honda CBR600RR	10	+30.040	23	
18	69	(Czech Republic) Ondřej Ježek	Kawasaki ZX-6R	10	+30.100	20	
19	22	(Italy) Gabriele Poma	Yamaha YZF-R6	10	+30.622	15	
20	112	(Spain) Josep Pedró	Yamaha YZF-R6	10	+32.785	13	
21	57	(Denmark) Kenny Tirsgaard	Suzuki GSX-R600	10	+34.248	24	
22	114	(Belgium) Nicolas Pirot	Yamaha YZF-R6	10	+35.103	25	
23	47	(Italy) Eddi La Marra	Honda CBR600RR	10	+35.531	26	
24	43	(Italy) Daniele Rossi	Honda CBR600RR	10	+35.679	22	
25	34	(United Kingdom) Jay Dunn	Honda CBR600RR	10	+40.046	28	
26	10	(United Kingdom) Leon Hunt	Honda CBR600RR	10	+1:04.661	27	
27	25	(Australia) Ryan Taylor	Kawasaki ZX-6R	10	+1:08.413	29	
28	66	(Netherlands) Branko Srdanov	Yamaha YZF-R6	10	+1:24.334	30	
Ret	41	(Switzerland) Gregory Junod	Yamaha YZF-R6	2	Accident	9	
Ret	4	(France) Mathieu Gines	Yamaha YZF-R6	0	Accident	2	
WD	35	(Bulgaria) Radostin Todorov	Yamaha YZF-R6		Withdrew		
WD	89	(Italy) Domenico Colucci	Ducati 749R		Withdrew		
