= 2008 Losail Superbike World Championship round =

2008 Qatar Superbike World Championship round
Round details
- Round 1 of 14 rounds in the 2008 Superbike World Championship. and Round 1 of 13 rounds in the 2008 Supersport World Championship.
- Date: February 23, 2008
- Location: Losail Circuit
- Course: Permanent racing facility 5.380 km (3.343 mi)

Superbike World Championship
Pole position
(Australia) Troy Corser
1'58.053
Fastest lap race 1	Fastest lap race 2
(Japan) Noriyuki Haga	(Spain) Fonsi Nieto
1'59.217	1'59.156

Supersport World Championship
Pole position
(France) Fabien Foret
2'01.928
Fastest lap
(France) Fabien Foret
2'02.626

The 2008 Losail Superbike World Championship round was the opening round of the 2008 Superbike World Championship season. It took place on the weekend of February 21–23, 2008 at the 5.38 km Losail International Circuit in Qatar.

== Superbike race 1 classification ==
Pos	No	Rider	Bike	Laps	Time	Grid	Points
1	21	(Australia) Troy Bayliss	Ducati 1098 F08	18	36:11.468	7	25
2	3	(Italy) Max Biaggi	Ducati 1098 RS 08	18	+0.396	3	20
3	11	(Australia) Troy Corser	Yamaha YZF-R1	18	+1.878	1	16
4	111	(Spain) Rubén Xaus	Ducati 1098 RS 08	18	+4.487	2	13
5	76	(Germany) Max Neukirchner	Suzuki GSX-R1000	18	+7.505	4	11
6	7	(Spain) Carlos Checa	Honda CBR1000RR	18	+9.639	9	10
7	10	(Spain) Fonsi Nieto	Suzuki GSX-R1000	18	+9.725	11	9
8	34	(Japan) Yukio Kagayama	Suzuki GSX-R1000	18	+19.537	8	8
9	84	(Italy) Michel Fabrizio	Ducati 1098 F08	18	+23.156	10	7
10	96	(Czech Republic) Jakub Smrž	Ducati 1098 RS 08	18	+24.429	12	6
11	44	(Italy) Roberto Rolfo	Honda CBR1000RR	18	+27.595	15	5
12	54	(Turkey) Kenan Sofuoğlu	Honda CBR1000RR	18	+27.979	14	4
13	36	(Spain) Gregorio Lavilla	Honda CBR1000RR	18	+28.237	13	3
14	41	(Japan) Noriyuki Haga	Yamaha YZF-R1	18	+30.205	6	2
15	55	(France) Régis Laconi	Kawasaki ZX-10R	18	+31.882	25	1
16	57	(Italy) Lorenzo Lanzi	Ducati 1098 RS 08	18	+32.067	5	
17	31	(Australia) Karl Muggeridge	Honda CBR1000RR	18	+40.745	18	
18	86	(Italy) Ayrton Badovini	Kawasaki ZX-10R	18	+41.280	16	
19	13	(Italy) Vittorio Iannuzzo	Kawasaki ZX-10R	18	+41.333	21	
20	194	(France) Sébastien Gimbert	Yamaha YZF-R1	18	+41.743	17	
21	38	(Japan) Shinichi Nakatomi	Yamaha YZF-R1	18	+43.183	26	
22	23	(Japan) Ryuichi Kiyonari	Honda CBR1000RR	18	+43.569	20	
23	94	(Spain) David Checa	Yamaha YZF-R1	18	+43.892	19	
24	83	(Australia) Russell Holland	Honda CBR1000RR	18	+50.380	22	
25	88	(Japan) Shuhei Aoyama	Honda CBR1000RR	18	+1:12.884	27	
Ret	22	(Italy) Luca Morelli	Honda CBR1000RR	12	Retirement	24	
Ret	77	(France) Loic Napoleone	Yamaha YZF-R1	12	Retirement	28	
Ret	100	(Japan) Makoto Tamada	Kawasaki ZX-10R	5	Retirement	23	

== Superbike race 2 classification ==
Pos	No	Rider	Bike	Laps	Time	Grid	Points
1	10	(Spain) Fonsi Nieto	Suzuki GSX-R1000	18	36:12.963	11	25
2	111	(Spain) Rubén Xaus	Ducati 1098 RS 08	18	+0.301	2	20
3	3	(Italy) Max Biaggi	Ducati 1098 RS 08	18	+1.321	3	16
4	21	(Australia) Troy Bayliss	Ducati 1098 F08	18	+6.452	7	13
5	84	(Italy) Michel Fabrizio	Ducati 1098 F08	18	+7.627	10	11
6	57	(Italy) Lorenzo Lanzi	Ducati 1098 RS 08	18	+9.117	5	10
7	11	(Australia) Troy Corser	Yamaha YZF-R1	18	+10.806	1	9
8	76	(Germany) Max Neukirchner	Suzuki GSX-R1000	18	+11.661	4	8
9	96	(Czech Republic) Jakub Smrž	Ducati 1098 RS 08	18	+13.269	12	7
10	54	(Turkey) Kenan Sofuoğlu	Honda CBR1000RR	18	+14.563	14	6
11	7	(Spain) Carlos Checa	Honda CBR1000RR	18	+15.953	9	5
12	100	(Japan) Makoto Tamada	Kawasaki ZX-10R	18	+16.748	23	4
13	41	(Japan) Noriyuki Haga	Yamaha YZF-R1	18	+18.356	6	3
14	36	(Spain) Gregorio Lavilla	Honda CBR1000RR	18	+26.311	13	2
15	44	(Italy) Roberto Rolfo	Honda CBR1000RR	18	+26.560	15	1
16	55	(France) Régis Laconi	Kawasaki ZX-10R	18	+26.683	25	
17	86	(Italy) Ayrton Badovini	Kawasaki ZX-10R	18	+26.821	16	
18	194	(France) Sébastien Gimbert	Yamaha YZF-R1	18	+28.650	17	
19	23	(Japan) Ryuichi Kiyonari	Honda CBR1000RR	18	+33.150	20	
20	31	(Australia) Karl Muggeridge	Honda CBR1000RR	18	+36.656	18	
21	83	(Australia) Russell Holland	Honda CBR1000RR	18	+42.633	22	
22	88	(Japan) Shuhei Aoyama	Honda CBR1000RR	18	+55.352	27	
Ret	13	(Italy) Vittorio Iannuzzo	Kawasaki ZX-10R	17	Accident	21	
Ret	38	(Japan) Shinichi Nakatomi	Yamaha YZF-R1	11	Retirement	26	
Ret	77	(France) Loic Napoleone	Yamaha YZF-R1	9	Accident	28	
Ret	94	(Spain) David Checa	Yamaha YZF-R1	8	Retirement	19	
Ret	22	(Italy) Luca Morelli	Honda CBR1000RR	4	Retirement	24	
Ret	34	(Japan) Yukio Kagayama	Suzuki GSX-R1000	0	Accident	8	

== Supersport race classification ==
Pos	No	Rider	Bike	Laps	Time	Grid	Points
1	23	(Australia) Broc Parkes	Yamaha YZF-R6	18	37:05.271	5	25
2	26	(Spain) Joan Lascorz	Honda CBR600RR	18	+0.048	6	20
3	18	(United Kingdom) Craig Jones	Honda CBR600RR	18	+0.755	2	16
4	25	(Australia) Josh Brookes	Honda CBR600RR	18	+9.502	12	13
5	14	(France) Matthieu Lagrive	Honda CBR600RR	18	+11.962	3	11
6	77	(Netherlands) Barry Veneman	Suzuki GSX-R600	18	+17.428	13	10
7	127	(Denmark) Robbin Harms	Honda CBR600RR	18	+17.660	22	9
8	44	(Spain) David Salom	Yamaha YZF-R6	18	+17.888	9	8
9	9	(United Kingdom) Chris Walker	Kawasaki ZX-6R	18	+25.883	20	7
10	105	(Italy) Gianluca Vizziello	Honda CBR600RR	18	+32.236	16	6
11	38	(France) Gregory Leblanc	Honda CBR600RR	18	+32.573	17	5
12	47	(Italy) Ivan Clementi	Triumph 675	18	+35.117	8	4
13	17	(Portugal) Miguel Praia	Honda CBR600RR	18	+36.390	18	3
14	31	(Finland) Vesa Kallio	Honda CBR600RR	18	+36.608	23	2
15	21	(Japan) Katsuaki Fujiwara	Kawasaki ZX-6R	18	+37.096	19	1
16	83	(Belgium) Didier van Keymeulen	Suzuki GSX-R600	18	+38.526	27	
17	37	(San Marino) William de Angelis	Honda CBR600RR	18	+42.675	26	
18	4	(Italy) Lorenzo Alfonsi	Kawasaki ZX-6R	18	+43.375	24	
19	32	(Italy) Mirko Giansanti	Honda CBR600RR	18	+44.319	25	
20	51	(Spain) Santiago Barragan	Honda CBR600RR	18	+45.924	30	
21	57	(Italy) Ilario Dionisi	Triumph 675	18	+47.277	29	
22	72	(Hungary) Attila Magda	Honda CBR600RR	18	+1:24.963	34	
23	199	(Italy) Danilo dell'Omo	Honda CBR600RR	18	+1:25.440	33	
24	888	(Spain) Josep Pedro Subirats	Yamaha YZF-R6	17	+1 Lap	36	
Ret	99	(France) Fabien Foret	Yamaha YZF-R6	17	Retirement	1	
Ret	75	(Slovenia) Luka Nedog	Honda CBR600RR	15	Accident	32	
Ret	24	(Australia) Garry McCoy	Triumph 675	7	Retirement	7	
Ret	15	(Hungary) Gergő Talmácsi	Honda CBR600RR	7	Retirement	35	
Ret	8	(Australia) Mark Aitchison	Triumph 675	6	Accident	11	
Ret	81	(United Kingdom) Graeme Gowland	Honda CBR600RR	6	Retirement	15	
Ret	121	(France) Arnaud Vincent	Kawasaki ZX-6R	5	Retirement	31	
Ret	65	(United Kingdom) Jonathan Rea	Honda CBR600RR	1	Retirement	4	
Ret	88	(Australia) Andrew Pitt	Honda CBR600RR	1	Retirement	10	
Ret	61	(Italy) Andrea Antonelli	Honda CBR600RR	0	Retirement	21	
Ret	69	(Italy) Gianluca Nannelli	Honda CBR600RR	0	Retirement	14	
Ret	55	(Italy) Massimo Roccoli	Yamaha YZF-R6	0	Retirement	28	
