= 2007 Silverstone Superbike World Championship round =

(United Kingdom) 2007 British Superbike World Championship round
Round details
- Round 7 of 13 rounds in the 2007 Superbike World Championship. and Round 7 of 13 rounds in the 2007 Supersport World Championship.
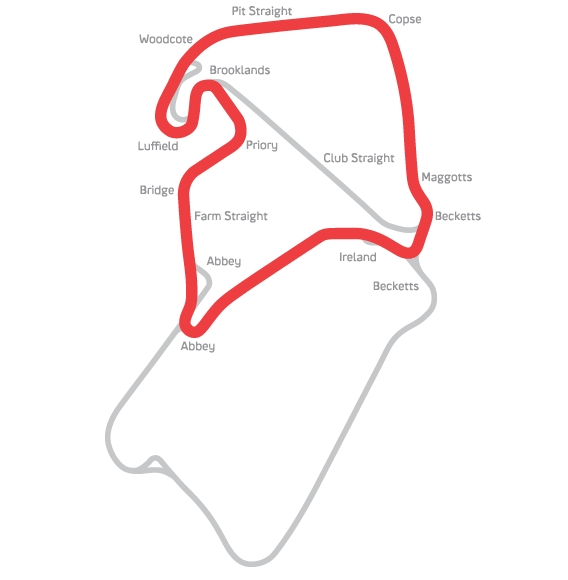
- Date: May 27, 2007
- Location: Silverstone
- Course: Permanent racing facility 3.561 km (2.213 mi)

Superbike World Championship
Pole position
(Australia) Troy Bayliss
1'24.558
Fastest lap race 1	Fastest lap race 2
(Japan) Noriyuki Haga
1'37.005

Supersport World Championship
Pole position
(France) Sébastien Charpentier
1'26.706
Fastest lap
(Australia) Anthony West
1'44.188

The 2007 Silverstone Superbike World Championship round was the seventh round of the 2007 Superbike World Championship season. It took place on the weekend of May 25–27, 2007, at the 3.561 km Silverstone International Circuit in the United Kingdom. Troy Bayliss won the only Superbike race, as race 2 was cancelled because of heavy rain. Anthony West won the Supersport race.

== Races summary ==
Heavy rains made for a wet first Superbike race and Supersport race at Silverstone and also caused the second Superbike race to be cancelled.

Troy Bayliss took the win in the only Superbike race over Noriyuki Haga. Third was Troy Corser. Roberto Rolfo rode a good race to score fourth position, Regis Laconi took fifth place, his best result of the year so far. Max Biaggi finished sixth and Lorenzo Lanzi was seventh and the last rider not to be lapped by the Bayliss.

Championship leader James Toseland crashed on lap three and he rejoined the race down in 18th place and eventually finished eighth. Ruben Xaus also fell on lap 24, allowing Toseland through, but also rejoined to finish ninth. Only 13 riders finished the race at Silverstone.

In the Supersport race, Anthony West scored a fabulous win in only his second Supersport race, proving to be the clear victor by some 33 seconds from Robbin Harms. The race was red-flagged six laps earlier than scheduled when a fallen machine blocked the racing line. Katsuaki Fujiwara was the final podium finisher. Championship leader Kenan Sofuoğlu fell on lap one and was ruled out of the points for the first time this year.

== Superbike race 1 classification ==
Pos	No	Rider	Bike	Laps	Time	Grid	Points
1	21	(Australia) Troy Bayliss	Ducati 999 F07	28	46:02.875	1	25
2	41	(Japan) Noriyuki Haga	Yamaha YZF-R1	28	+2.035	2	20
3	11	(Australia) Troy Corser	Yamaha YZF-R1	28	+4.568	5	16
4	44	(Italy) Roberto Rolfo	Honda CBR1000RR	28	+50.039	13	13
5	55	(France) Régis Laconi	Kawasaki ZX-10R	28	+1:09.634	14	11
6	3	(Italy) Max Biaggi	Suzuki GSX-R1000 K7	28	+1:20.982	8	10
7	57	(Italy) Lorenzo Lanzi	Ducati 999 F07	28	+1:33.061	4	9
8	52	(United Kingdom) James Toseland	Honda CBR1000RR	27	+1 Lap	3	8
9	111	(Spain) Ruben Xaus	Ducati 999 F06	27	+1 Lap	6	7
10	76	(Germany) Max Neukirchner	Suzuki GSX-R1000 K6	27	+1 Lap	16	6
11	13	(Italy) Vittorio Iannuzzo	Kawasaki ZX-10R	27	+1 Lap	17	5
12	22	(Italy) Luca Morelli	Honda CBR1000RR	27	+1 Lap	20	4
13	38	(Japan) Shinichi Nakatomi	Yamaha YZF-R1	26	+2 Laps	18	3
Ret	10	(Spain) Fonsi Nieto	Kawasaki ZX-10R	21	Retirement	11	
Ret	71	(Japan) Yukio Kagayama	Suzuki GSX-R1000 K7	20	Retirement	7	
Ret	96	(Czech Republic) Jakub Smrž	Ducati 999 F05	17	Retirement	12	
Ret	25	(Australia) Josh Brookes	Honda CBR1000RR	13	Retirement	10	
Ret	53	(Italy) Alex Polita	Suzuki GSX-R1000 K6	12	Retirement	19	
Ret	42	(United Kingdom) Dean Ellison	Ducati 999RS	6	Retirement	21	
Ret	31	(Australia) Karl Muggeridge	Honda CBR1000RR	1	Retirement	9	
Ret	84	(Italy) Michel Fabrizio	Honda CBR1000RR	0	Retirement	15	

== Superbike race 2 cancelled ==
The second World Superbike race at Silverstone was cancelled due to the weather conditions.

== Supersport classification ==
Pos	Rider	Bike	Time/Retired	Laps	Points
1	(Australia) Anthony West	Yamaha YZF-R6	39'16.245	22	25
2	(Denmark) Robbin Harms	Honda CBR600RR	39'49.722	22	20
3	(Japan) Katsuaki Fujiwara	Honda CBR600RR	40'04.302	22	16
4	(France) Fabien Foret	Kawasaki ZX-6R	40'08.022	22	13
5	(Italy) Gianluca Vizziello	Yamaha YZF-R6	40'10.540	22	11
6	(France) Matthieu Lagrive	Honda CBR600RR	40'17.824	22	10
7	(Spain) Javier Fores	Honda CBR600RR	40'53.821	22	9
8	(Italy) Lorenzo Alfonsi	Honda CBR600RR	41'08.351	22	8
9	(France) Julien Enjolras	Yamaha YZF-R6	41'09.429	22	7
10	(Netherlands) Barry Veneman	Suzuki GSX-R600	39'16.868	21	6
11	(Portugal) Miguel Praia	Honda CBR600RR	39'26.330	21	5
12	(France) Sébastien Gimbert	Yamaha YZF-R6	39'36.066	21	4
13	(Germany) Jesco Günther	Honda CBR600RR	39'49.023	21	3
14	(France) Gregory Leblanc	Honda CBR600RR	40'44.006	21	2
15	(Spain) Joan Lascorz	Honda CBR600RR	40'51.121	21	1
16	(Russia) Vladimir Ivanov	Yamaha YZF-R6	41'01.472	21	
17	(Spain) David Salom	Yamaha YZF-R6	39'52.278	20	
18	(Spain) David Forner	Yamaha YZF-R6	40'26.767	20	
19	(Austria) Yves Polzer	Ducati 749R	40'28.890	20	
Ret	(Italy) Massimo Roccoli	Yamaha YZF-R6	38'17.721	21	
Ret	(Hungary) Gergo Talmacsi	Yamaha YZF-R6	39'11.043	18	
Ret	(Australia) Broc Parkes	Yamaha YZF-R6	23'17.576	13	
Ret	(Finland) Vesa Kallio	Suzuki GSX-R600	22'24.021	12	
Ret	(Spain) Pere Riba	Kawasaki ZX-6R	16'16.461	9	
Ret	(Italy) Davide Giugliano	Kawasaki ZX-6R	17'14.018	9	
Ret	(France) Sébastien Charpentier	Honda CBR600RR	16'14.947	8	
Ret	(United Kingdom) Craig Jones	Honda CBR600RR	12'41.503	7	
Ret	(Spain) David Checa	Yamaha YZF-R6	11'24.741	6	
Ret	(Italy) Gilles Boccolini	Kawasaki ZX-6R	4'24.314	2	
Ret	(Italy) Simone Sanna	Honda CBR600RR	4'27.513	2	
Ret	(France) Yoann Tiberio	Honda CBR600RR	1'53.465	1	
Ret	(Turkey) Kenan Sofuoğlu	Honda CBR600RR		0	

== Superstock 1000 classification ==
Pos	No.	Rider	Bike	Laps	Time/Retired	Grid	Points
1	12	(Australia) Brendan Roberts	Ducati 1098S	10	17:54.454	11	25
2	3	(Australia) Mark Aitchison	Suzuki GSX-R1000 K6	10	+3.270	6	20
3	96	(Czech Republic) Matěj Smrž	Honda CBR1000RR	10	+9.170	9	16
4	19	(Belgium) Xavier Simeon	Suzuki GSX-R1000 K6	10	+14.674	13	13
5	51	(Italy) Michele Pirro	Yamaha YZF-R1	10	+20.559	1	11
6	15	(Italy) Matteo Baiocco	Yamaha YZF-R1	10	+26.737	7	10
7	23	(France) Cédric Tangre	Yamaha YZF-R1	10	+27.183	16	9
8	4	(France) Loïc Napoleone	MV Agusta F4 312 R	10	+27.437	14	8
9	86	(Italy) Ayrton Badovini	MV Agusta F4 312 R	10	+32.785	4	7
10	71	(Italy) Claudio Corti	Yamaha YZF-R1	10	+34.403	3	6
11	14	(Italy) Lorenzo Baroni	Ducati 1098S	10	+37.299	8	5
12	57	(Italy) Ilario Dionisi	Suzuki GSX-R1000 K6	10	+37.586	5	4
13	59	(Italy) Niccolò Canepa	Ducati 1098S	10	+40.906	2	3
14	24	(Slovenia) Marko Jerman	Yamaha YZF-R1	10	+46.422	20	2
15	25	(Germany) Dario Giuseppetti	Yamaha YZF-R1	10	+58.452	24	1
16	11	(Italy) Denis Sacchetti	MV Agusta F4 312 R	10	+1:05.326	17	
17	88	(Germany) Timo Gieseler	Yamaha YZF-R1	10	+1:13.146	26	
18	49	(Germany) Arne Tode	Honda CBR1000RR	10	+1:16.706	12	
19	33	(Estonia) Marko Rohtlaan	Honda CBR1000RR	10	+1:20.135	15	
20	29	(Italy) Niccolò Rosso	Ducati 1098S	10	+1:20.452	32	
21	16	(Netherlands) Raymond Schouten	Yamaha YZF-R1	10	+1:22.769	30	
22	34	(Hungary) Balázs Németh	Suzuki GSX-R1000 K6	10	+1:23.441	31	
23	10	(France) Franck Millet	MV Agusta F4 312 R	10	+1:24.258	21	
24	18	(United Kingdom) Matt Bond	Suzuki GSX-R1000 K6	10	+1:24.553	35	
25	99	(Italy) Danilo Dell'Omo	MV Agusta F4 312 R	10	+1:25.733	10	
26	77	(United Kingdom) Barry Burrell	Honda CBR1000RR	10	+1:28.500	23	
27	134	(South Africa) Greg Gildenhuys	Yamaha YZF-R1	10	+1:28.919	25	
28	21	(Belgium) Wim Van Den Broeck	Yamaha YZF-R1	10	+1:29.654	33	
29	42	(Italy) Leonardo Biliotti	MV Agusta F4 312 R	10	+1:35.832	28	
30	56	(Switzerland) Daniel Sutter	Yamaha YZF-R1	10	+1:36.631	22	
31	92	(Netherlands) Ronald Ter Braake	Honda CBR1000RR	10	+1:46.301	27	
32	58	(Italy) Robert Gianfardoni	Yamaha YZF-R1	9	+1 lap	37	
33	75	(Slovenia) Luka Nedog	Ducati 1098S	9	+1 lap	29	
34	13	(Hungary) Victor Kispataki	Suzuki GSX-R1000 K6	9	+1 lap	34	
35	37	(Italy) Raffaele Filice	Suzuki GSX-R1000 K6	9	+1 lap	36	
Ret	55	(Belgium) Olivier Depoorter	Yamaha YZF-R1	1	Accident	19	
Ret	44	(Austria) René Mähr	Yamaha YZF-R1	0	Accident	18	
DNS	83	(Belgium) Didier Van Keymeulen	Yamaha YZF-R1		Did not start		
DNS	32	(South Africa) Sheridan Morais	Ducati 1098S		Did not start		
