= 2008 Vallelunga Superbike World Championship round =

(Italy) 2008 Vallelunga Superbike World Championship round
Round details
- Round 12 of 14 rounds in the 2008 Superbike World Championship. and Round 11 of 13 rounds in the 2008 Supersport World Championship.
- Date: September 21, 2008
- Location: ACI Vallelunga Circuit
- Course: Permanent racing facility 4.085 km (2.538 mi)

Superbike World Championship
Pole position
(Australia) Troy Bayliss
1:36.606
Fastest lap race 1	Fastest lap race 2
(Spain) Carlos Checa	(Australia) Troy Corser
1:37.537	1:37.072

Supersport World Championship
Pole position
(Australia) Broc Parkes
1:38.910
Fastest lap
(Australia) Broc Parkes
1:39.417

The 2008 Vallelunga Superbike World Championship round was the twelfth round of the 2008 Superbike World Championship season. It took place on the weekend of September 19-21, 2008, at the Vallelunga circuit.

== Superbike race 1 classification ==
Pos	No	Rider	Bike	Laps	Time	Grid	Points
1	41	(Japan) Noriyuki Haga	Yamaha YZF-R1	24	39:25.030	3	25
2	3	(Italy) Max Biaggi	Ducati 1098 RS 08	24	+0.129	4	20
3	11	(Australia) Troy Corser	Yamaha YZF-R1	24	+0.535	2	16
4	76	(Germany) Max Neukirchner	Suzuki GSX-R1000	24	+5.188	6	13
5	7	(Spain) Carlos Checa	Honda CBR1000RR	24	+6.693	12	11
6	21	(Australia) Troy Bayliss	Ducati 1098 F08	24	+7.993	1	10
7	84	(Italy) Michel Fabrizio	Ducati 1098 F08	24	+16.976	7	9
8	44	(Italy) Roberto Rolfo	Honda CBR1000RR	24	+18.359	13	8
9	34	(Japan) Yukio Kagayama	Suzuki GSX-R1000	24	+19.214	8	7
10	38	(Japan) Shinichi Nakatomi	Yamaha YZF-R1	24	+19.386	19	6
11	57	(Italy) Lorenzo Lanzi	Ducati 1098 RS 08	24	+21.230	9	5
12	10	(Spain) Fonsi Nieto	Suzuki GSX-R1000	24	+24.956	10	4
13	96	(Czech Republic) Jakub Smrz	Ducati 1098 RS 08	24	+25.186	21	3
14	36	(Spain) Gregorio Lavilla	Honda CBR1000RR	24	+31.799	17	2
15	86	(Italy) Ayrton Badovini	Kawasaki ZX-10R	24	+33.949	18	1
16	55	(France) Régis Laconi	Kawasaki ZX-10R	24	+34.050	15	
17	94	(Spain) David Checa	Yamaha YZF-R1	24	+34.665	20	
18	9	(United Kingdom) Chris Walker	Honda CBR1000RR	24	+52.420	26	
19	88	(Japan) Shuhei Aoyama	Honda CBR1000RR	24	+1:02.555	24	
20	100	(Japan) Makoto Tamada	Kawasaki ZX-10R	24	+1:06.475	25	
21	122	(Czech Republic) Matej Smrž	Honda CBR1000RR	24	+1:16.985	28	
22	50	(United States) Matt Lynn	Honda CBR1000RR	23	+1 Lap	29	
Ret	194	(France) Sébastien Gimbert	Yamaha YZF-R1	17	Retirement	22	
Ret	13	(Italy) Vittorio Iannuzzo	Kawasaki ZX-10R	14	Retirement	23	
Ret	111	(Spain) Ruben Xaus	Ducati 1098 RS 08	6	Retirement	11	
Ret	73	(Austria) Christian Zaiser	Yamaha YZF-R1	5	Retirement	27	
Ret	23	(Japan) Ryuichi Kiyonari	Honda CBR1000RR	3	Accident	5	
Ret	54	(Turkey) Kenan Sofuoğlu	Honda CBR1000RR	2	Accident	14	
Ret	31	(Australia) Karl Muggeridge	Honda CBR1000RR	2	Retirement	16	

== Superbike race 2 classification ==
Pos	No	Rider	Bike	Laps	Time	Grid	Points
1	41	(Japan) Noriyuki Haga	Yamaha YZF-R1	24	39:10.265	3	25
2	84	(Italy) Michel Fabrizio	Ducati 1098 F08	24	+1.507	7	20
3	11	(Australia) Troy Corser	Yamaha YZF-R1	24	+2.268	2	16
4	76	(Germany) Max Neukirchner	Suzuki GSX-R1000	24	+11.813	6	13
5	7	(Spain) Carlos Checa	Honda CBR1000RR	24	+17.922	12	11
6	10	(Spain) Fonsi Nieto	Suzuki GSX-R1000	24	+18.281	10	10
7	34	(Japan) Yukio Kagayama	Suzuki GSX-R1000	24	+19.368	8	9
8	38	(Japan) Shinichi Nakatomi	Yamaha YZF-R1	24	+19.717	19	8
9	55	(France) Régis Laconi	Kawasaki ZX-10R	24	+23.868	15	7
10	44	(Italy) Roberto Rolfo	Honda CBR1000RR	24	+24.198	13	6
11	96	(Czech Republic) Jakub Smrz	Ducati 1098 RS 08	24	+25.426	21	5
12	111	(Spain) Ruben Xaus	Ducati 1098 RS 08	24	+28.384	11	4
13	23	(Japan) Ryuichi Kiyonari	Honda CBR1000RR	24	+30.436	5	3
14	194	(France) Sébastien Gimbert	Yamaha YZF-R1	24	+36.490	22	2
15	9	(United Kingdom) Chris Walker	Honda CBR1000RR	24	+42.903	26	1
16	21	(Australia) Troy Bayliss	Ducati 1098 F08	24	+43.758	1	
17	88	(Japan) Shuhei Aoyama	Honda CBR1000RR	24	+44.993	24	
18	57	(Italy) Lorenzo Lanzi	Ducati 1098 RS 08	24	+48.469	9	
19	100	(Japan) Makoto Tamada	Kawasaki ZX-10R	24	+58.868	25	
20	94	(Spain) David Checa	Yamaha YZF-R1	24	+1:18.547	20	
21	122	(Czech Republic) Matej Smrž	Honda CBR1000RR	24	+1:42.272	28	
22	50	(United States) Matt Lynn	Honda CBR1000RR	23	+1 Lap	29	
Ret	86	(Italy) Ayrton Badovini	Kawasaki ZX-10R	15	Retirement	18	
Ret	13	(Italy) Vittorio Iannuzzo	Kawasaki ZX-10R	13	Retirement	23	
Ret	36	(Spain) Gregorio Lavilla	Honda CBR1000RR	6	Retirement	17	
Ret	73	(Austria) Christian Zaiser	Yamaha YZF-R1	5	Retirement	27	
Ret	31	(Australia) Karl Muggeridge	Honda CBR1000RR	2	Accident	16	
Ret	54	(Turkey) Kenan Sofuoğlu	Honda CBR1000RR	0	Accident	14	
Ret	3	(Italy) Max Biaggi	Ducati 1098 RS 08	0	Accident	4	

== Supersport race classification ==
Pos	No	Rider	Bike	Laps	Time	Grid	Points
1	65	(United Kingdom) Jonathan Rea	Honda CBR600RR	22	36:48.656	3	25
2	23	(Australia) Broc Parkes	Yamaha YZF-R6	22	+2.971	1	20
3	50	(Republic of Ireland) Eugene Laverty	Yamaha YZF-R6	22	+6.461	7	16
4	26	(Spain) Joan Lascorz	Honda CBR600RR	22	+7.135	6	13
5	77	(Netherlands) Barry Veneman	Suzuki GSX-R600	22	+10.945	2	11
6	127	(Denmark) Robbin Harms	Honda CBR600RR	22	+14.412	9	10
7	69	(Italy) Gianluca Nannelli	Honda CBR600RR	22	+14.557	4	9
8	83	(Belgium) Didier van Keymeulen	Suzuki GSX-R600	22	+19.286	10	8
9	8	(Australia) Mark Aitchison	Triumph 675	22	+23.854	11	7
10	41	(United States) Josh Hayes	Honda CBR600RR	22	+31.193	12	6
11	47	(Italy) Ivan Clementi	Triumph 675	22	+31.327	14	5
12	25	(Australia) Josh Brookes	Honda CBR600RR	22	+39.771	19	4
13	17	(Portugal) Miguel Praia	Honda CBR600RR	22	+40.957	16	3
14	123	(Italy) Terence Toti	Suzuki GSX-R600	22	+41.196	15	2
15	105	(Italy) Gianluca Vizziello	Honda CBR600RR	22	+41.337	18	1
16	11	(Australia) Russell Holland	Honda CBR600RR	22	+43.421	13	
17	55	(Italy) Massimo Roccoli	Yamaha YZF-R6	22	+44.790	20	
18	21	(Japan) Katsuaki Fujiwara	Kawasaki ZX-6R	22	+45.564	17	
19	44	(Spain) David Salom	Yamaha YZF-R6	22	+54.098	21	
20	126	(United Kingdom) Chris Martin	Kawasaki ZX-6R	22	+58.063	25	
21	81	(United Kingdom) Graeme Gowland	Honda CBR600RR	22	+1:01.773	22	
22	7	(Czech Republic) Patrik Vostárek	Honda CBR600RR	22	+1:16.595	27	
23	10	(France) David Perret	Honda CBR600RR	22	+1:16.917	31	
24	124	(Australia) Jeremy Crowe	Yamaha YZF-R6	22	+1:17.279	24	
25	34	(Hungary) Balázs Németh	Honda CBR600RR	22	+1:17.539	30	
26	117	(Italy) Denis Sacchetti	Honda CBR600RR	22	+1:28.143	32	
27	42	(Australia) Alex Cudlin	Triumph 675	22	+1:29.485	34	
Ret	88	(Australia) Andrew Pitt	Honda CBR600RR	18	Accident	5	
Ret	30	(Germany) Jesco Gunther	Honda CBR600RR	11	Retirement	28	
Ret	14	(France) Matthieu Lagrive	Honda CBR600RR	9	Retirement	8	
Ret	35	(Italy) Giuseppe Barone	Honda CBR600RR	8	Retirement	29	
Ret	45	(Italy) Andrea Zappa	Triumph 675	7	Retirement	33	
Ret	199	(Italy) Danilo dell'Omo	Honda CBR600RR	6	Retirement	23	
Ret	4	(Italy) Lorenzo Alfonsi	Honda CBR600RR	5	Retirement	26	
