= 2008 Miller Superbike World Championship round =

(United States) 2008 Miller Superbike World Championship round
Round details
- Round 6 of 14 rounds in the 2008 Superbike World Championship.
- Date: June 1, 2008
- Location: Miller Motorsports Park
- Course: Permanent racing facility 4.907 km (3.049 mi)

Superbike World Championship
Pole position
(Spain) Carlos Checa
1:48.193
| Fastest lap race 1 | Fastest lap race 2 |
| (Spain) Carlos Checa | (Spain) Carlos Checa |
| 1:50.091 | 1:49.703 |

The 2008 Miller Superbike World Championship round was the sixth round of the 2008 Superbike World Championship. It took place on the weekend of May 30-June 1, 2008, at the Salt Lake City circuit.

== Superbike race 1 classification ==
| Pos | No | Rider | Bike | Laps | Time | Grid | Points |
|---|---|---|---|---|---|---|---|
| 1 | 7 | (Spain) Carlos Checa | Honda CBR1000RR | 20 | 37:04.991 | 1 | 25 |
| 2 | 11 | (Australia) Troy Corser | Yamaha YZF-R1 | 20 | +2.809 | 5 | 20 |
| 3 | 84 | (Italy) Michel Fabrizio | Ducati 1098 F08 | 20 | +6.546 | 4 | 16 |
| 4 | 76 | (Germany) Max Neukirchner | Suzuki GSX-R1000 | 20 | +7.764 | 2 | 13 |
| 5 | 10 | (Spain) Fonsi Nieto | Suzuki GSX-R1000 | 20 | +16.475 | 13 | 11 |
| 6 | 96 | (Czech Republic) Jakub Smrz | Ducati 1098 RS 08 | 20 | +17.126 | 11 | 10 |
| 7 | 31 | (Australia) Karl Muggeridge | Honda CBR1000RR | 20 | +17.284 | 12 | 9 |
| 8 | 34 | (Japan) Yukio Kagayama | Suzuki GSX-R1000 | 20 | +17.416 | 8 | 8 |
| 9 | 3 | (Italy) Max Biaggi | Ducati 1098 RS 08 | 20 | +18.117 | 9 | 7 |
| 10 | 23 | (Japan) Ryuichi Kiyonari | Honda CBR1000RR | 20 | +20.467 | 20 | 6 |
| 11 | 57 | (Italy) Lorenzo Lanzi | Ducati 1098 RS 08 | 20 | +21.742 | 15 | 5 |
| 12 | 54 | (Turkey) Kenan Sofuoğlu | Honda CBR1000RR | 20 | +27.533 | 25 | 4 |
| 13 | 36 | (Spain) Gregorio Lavilla | Honda CBR1000RR | 20 | +32.609 | 23 | 3 |
| 14 | 111 | (Spain) Ruben Xaus | Ducati 1098 RS 08 | 20 | +33.165 | 6 | 2 |
| 15 | 83 | (Australia) Russell Holland | Honda CBR1000RR | 20 | +34.182 | 17 | 1 |
| 16 | 38 | (Japan) Shinichi Nakatomi | Yamaha YZF-R1 | 20 | +34.500 | 22 | |
| 17 | 86 | (Italy) Ayrton Badovini | Kawasaki ZX-10R | 20 | +36.155 | 16 | |
| 18 | 194 | (France) Sébastien Gimbert | Yamaha YZF-R1 | 20 | +41.685 | 24 | |
| 19 | 100 | (Japan) Makoto Tamada | Kawasaki ZX-10R | 20 | +43.579 | 18 | |
| 20 | 44 | (Italy) Roberto Rolfo | Honda CBR1000RR | 20 | +54.195 | 28 | |
| 21 | 43 | (United States) Jason Pridmore | Honda CBR1000RR | 20 | +1:00.388 | 19 | |
| 22 | 13 | (Italy) Vittorio Iannuzzo | Kawasaki ZX-10R | 20 | +1:02.104 | 21 | |
| 23 | 61 | (United States) Scott Jensen | Suzuki GSX-R1000 K8 | 20 | +1:09.953 | 29 | |
| 24 | 77 | (France) Loic Napoleone | Yamaha YZF-R1 | 20 | +1:12.258 | 27 | |
| Ret | 88 | (Japan) Shuhei Aoyama | Honda CBR1000RR | 14 | Retirement | 14 | |
| Ret | 94 | (Spain) David Checa | Yamaha YZF-R1 | 6 | Retirement | 26 | |
| Ret | 41 | (Japan) Noriyuki Haga | Yamaha YZF-R1 | 5 | Accident | 10 | |
| Ret | 21 | (Australia) Troy Bayliss | Ducati 1098 F08 | 4 | Accident | 3 | |
| Ret | 55 | (France) Régis Laconi | Kawasaki ZX-10R | 4 | Retirement | 7 | |

== Superbike race 2 classification ==
| Pos | No | Rider | Bike | Laps | Time | Grid | Points |
|---|---|---|---|---|---|---|---|
| 1 | 7 | (Spain) Carlos Checa | Honda CBR1000RR | 21 | 38'44.105 | 1 | 25 |
| 2 | 76 | (Germany) Max Neukirchner | Suzuki GSX-R1000 | 21 | +3.547 | 2 | 20 |
| 3 | 84 | (Italy) Michel Fabrizio | Ducati 1098 F08 | 21 | +6.613 | 4 | 16 |
| 4 | 3 | (Italy) Max Biaggi | Ducati 1098 RS 08 | 21 | +7.878 | 9 | 13 |
| 5 | 34 | (Japan) Yukio Kagayama | Suzuki GSX-R1000 | 21 | +10.568 | 8 | 11 |
| 6 | 41 | (Japan) Noriyuki Haga | Yamaha YZF-R1 | 21 | +11.539 | 10 | 10 |
| 7 | 23 | (Japan) Ryuichi Kiyonari | Honda CBR1000RR | 21 | +18.381 | 20 | 9 |
| 8 | 10 | (Spain) Fonsi Nieto | Suzuki GSX-R1000 | 21 | +20.646 | 13 | 8 |
| 9 | 55 | (France) Régis Laconi | Kawasaki ZX-10R | 21 | +21.264 | 7 | 7 |
| 10 | 57 | (Italy) Lorenzo Lanzi | Ducati 1098 RS 08 | 21 | +24.863 | 15 | 6 |
| 11 | 31 | (Australia) Karl Muggeridge | Honda CBR1000RR | 21 | +25.672 | 12 | 5 |
| 12 | 86 | (Italy) Ayrton Badovini | Kawasaki ZX-10R | 21 | +31.711 | 16 | 4 |
| 13 | 100 | (Japan) Makoto Tamada | Kawasaki ZX-10R | 21 | +35.628 | 18 | 3 |
| 14 | 54 | (Turkey) Kenan Sofuoğlu | Honda CBR1000RR | 21 | +42.816 | 25 | 2 |
| 15 | 36 | (Spain) Gregorio Lavilla | Honda CBR1000RR | 21 | +45.034 | 23 | 1 |
| 16 | 44 | (Italy) Roberto Rolfo | Honda CBR1000RR | 21 | +50.220 | 28 | |
| 17 | 194 | (France) Sébastien Gimbert | Yamaha YZF-R1 | 21 | +50.653 | 24 | |
| 18 | 43 | (United States) Jason Pridmore | Honda CBR1000RR | 21 | +51.188 | 19 | |
| 19 | 13 | (Italy) Vittorio Iannuzzo | Kawasaki ZX-10R | 21 | +1:04.533 | 21 | |
| 20 | 61 | (United States) Scott Jensen | Suzuki GSX-R1000 K8 | 21 | +1:12.049 | 29 | |
| 21 | 77 | (France) Loic Napoleone | Yamaha YZF-R1 | 21 | +1:19.221 | 27 | |
| 22 | 21 | (Australia) Troy Bayliss | Ducati 1098 F08 | 19 | +2 Laps | 3 | |
| Ret | 11 | (Australia) Troy Corser | Yamaha YZF-R1 | 16 | Accident | 5 | |
| Ret | 88 | (Japan) Shuhei Aoyama | Honda CBR1000RR | 14 | Retirement | 14 | |
| Ret | 38 | (Japan) Shinichi Nakatomi | Yamaha YZF-R1 | 13 | Retirement | 22 | |
| Ret | 111 | (Spain) Ruben Xaus | Ducati 1098 RS 08 | 5 | Accident | 6 | |
| Ret | 83 | (Australia) Russell Holland | Honda CBR1000RR | 1 | Retirement | 17 | |
| DSQ | 96 | (Czech Republic) Jakub Smrz | Ducati 1098 RS 08 | 4 | Disqualified | 11 | |

== Notes ==
- Jakub Smrz was disqualified in Race 2 for exiting the pits when the pitlane was already closed.
