= 2014 Losail Superbike World Championship round =

(Qatar) 2014 Losail Superbike World Championship round
Round details
- Round 12 of 12 rounds in the 2014 Superbike World Championship. and Round 11 of 11 rounds in the 2014 Supersport World Championship.
- Date: 2 November, 2014
- Location: Losail
- Course: Permanent racing facility 5.419 km (3.367 mi)

Superbike World Championship
Pole position
(Italy) Davide Giugliano
1:57.033
Fastest lap race 1	Fastest lap race 2
(France) Loris Baz	(France) Sylvain Guintoli
1:58.096	1:57.906

Supersport World Championship
Pole position
(France) Jules Cluzel
2:01.851
Fastest lap
(France) Jules Cluzel
2:01.999

The 2014 Losail Superbike World Championship round is the twelfth and final round of the 2014 Superbike World Championship. It took place over the weekend of 31 October–2 November 2014 at the Losail International Circuit located in Lusail, Qatar. During race 2, Sylvain Guintoli is crowned as the new Superbike World Championship champion after beating Tom Sykes by just 6 points.

== Superbike ==
=== Race 1 classification ===
Pos	No.	Rider	Bike	Laps	Time	Grid	Points
1	50	(France) Sylvain Guintoli	Aprilia RSV4 Factory	17	33:46.738	5	25
2	76	(United Kingdom) Loris Baz	Kawasaki ZX-10R	17	+2.650	2	20
3	1	(United Kingdom) Tom Sykes	Kawasaki ZX-10R	17	+3.955	3	16
4	65	(United Kingdom) Jonathan Rea	Honda CBR1000RR	17	+4.805	7	13
5	34	(Italy) Davide Giugliano	Ducati 1199 Panigale R	17	+7.861	1	11
6	24	(Spain) Toni Elias	Aprilia RSV4 Factory	17	+8.192	10	10
7	7	(United Kingdom) Chaz Davies	Ducati 1199 Panigale R	17	+8.991	4	9
8	33	(Italy) Marco Melandri	Aprilia RSV4 Factory	17	+10.512	8	8
9	58	(Republic of Ireland) Eugene Laverty	Suzuki GSX-R1000	17	+15.978	9	7
10	22	(United Kingdom) Alex Lowes	Suzuki GSX-R1000	17	+21.456	11	6
11	91	(United Kingdom) Leon Haslam	Honda CBR1000RR	17	+25.977	6	5
12	59	(Italy) Niccolò Canepa	Ducati 1199 Panigale R EVO	17	+29.085	14	4
13	44	(Spain) David Salom	Kawasaki ZX-10R EVO	17	+29.096	12	3
14	52	(France) Sylvain Barrier	BMW S1000RR EVO	17	+39.270	13	2
15	67	(Australia) Bryan Staring	Kawasaki ZX-10R EVO	17	+43.360	17	1
16	11	(France) Jérémy Guarnoni	Kawasaki ZX-10R EVO	17	+46.206	18	
17	99	(United States) Geoff May	EBR 1190 RX	17	+1:16.323	19	
18	10	(Hungary) Imre Tóth	BMW S1000RR	16	+1 lap	23	
Ret	21	(Italy) Alessandro Andreozzi	Kawasaki ZX-10R EVO	7	Retirement	15	
Ret	16	(Hungary) Gábor Rizmayer	BMW S1000RR EVO	6	Accident	22	
Ret	95	(Australia) Alex Cudlin	Kawasaki ZX-10R EVO	2	Accident	16	
Ret	20	(United States) Aaron Yates	EBR 1190 RX	2	Accident	21	
Ret	71	(Italy) Claudio Corti	MV Agusta F4 RR	1	Retirement	20	
DNS	32	(South Africa) Sheridan Morais	Kawasaki ZX-10R EVO		Did not start		
Report:

=== Race 2 classification ===
Pos	No.	Rider	Bike	Laps	Time	Grid	Points
1	50	(France) Sylvain Guintoli	Aprilia RSV4 Factory	17	33:41.803	5	25
2	65	(United Kingdom) Jonathan Rea	Honda CBR1000RR	17	+3.568	7	20
3	1	(United Kingdom) Tom Sykes	Kawasaki ZX-10R EVO	17	+5.092	3	16
4	33	(Italy) Marco Melandri	Aprilia RSV4 Factory	17	+8.305	8	13
5	7	(United Kingdom) Chaz Davies	Ducati 1199 Panigale R	17	+8.390	4	11
6	24	(Spain) Toni Elias	Aprilia RSV4 Factory	17	+8.654	10	10
7	76	(France) Loris Baz	Kawasaki ZX-10R	17	+9.115	2	9
8	34	(Italy) Davide Giugliano	Ducati 1199 Panigale R	17	+13.015	1	8
9	22	(United Kingdom) Alex Lowes	Suzuki GSX-R1000	17	+13.478	11	7
10	91	(United Kingdom) Leon Haslam	Honda CBR1000RR	17	+25.471	6	6
11	44	(Spain) David Salom	Kawasaki ZX-10R EVO	17	+37.964	12	5
12	59	(Italy) Niccolò Canepa	Ducati 1199 Panigale R EVO	17	+38.001	14	4
13	67	(Australia) Bryan Staring	Kawasaki ZX-10R EVO	17	+46.248	17	3
14	71	(Italy) Claudio Corti	MV Agusta F4 RR	17	+51.926	20	2
15	21	(Italy) Alessandro Andreozzi	Kawasaki ZX-10R EVO	17	+56.331	15	1
16	99	(United States) Geoff May	EBR 1190 RX	17	+1:23.937	19	
17	10	(Hungary) Imre Tóth	BMW S1000RR	16	+1 lap	22	
18	95	(Australia) Alex Cudlin	Kawasaki ZX-10R EVO	16	+1 lap	16	
Ret	52	(France) Sylvain Barrier	BMW S1000RR EVO	5	Retirement	13	
Ret	20	(United States) Aaron Yates	EBR 1190 RX	4	Accident	21	
Ret	11	(France) Jérémy Guarnoni	Kawasaki ZX-10R EVO	3	Accident	18	
Ret	58	(Republic of Ireland) Eugene Laverty	Suzuki GSX-R1000	2	Accident	9	
DNS	16	(Hungary) Gábor Rizmayer	BMW S1000RR EVO		Did not start		
DNS	32	(South Africa) Sheridan Morais	Kawasaki ZX-10R EVO		Did not start		
Report:

== Supersport ==
=== Race classification ===
Pos	No.	Rider	Bike	Laps	Time	Grid	Points
1	60	(Netherlands) Michael Van Der Mark	Honda CBR600RR	15	30:42.722	2	25
2	14	(Thailand) Ratthapark Wilairot	Honda CBR600RR	15	+3.570	4	20
3	16	(France) Jules Cluzel	MV Agusta F3 675	15	+5.124	1	16
4	17	(France) Lucas Mahias	Yamaha YZF-R6	15	+5.476	6	13
5	88	(United Kingdom) Kev Coghlan	Yamaha YZF-R6	15	+5.578	7	11
6	44	(Italy) Roberto Rolfo	Kawasaki ZX-6R	15	+8.275	9	10
7	26	(Italy) Lorenzo Zanetti	Honda CBR600RR	15	+8.965	3	9
8	54	(Turkey) Kenan Sofuoğlu	Kawasaki ZX-6R	15	+12.367	8	8
9	5	(Italy) Roberto Tamburini	Kawasaki ZX-6R	15	+22.923	10	7
10	155	(Italy) Massimo Roccoli	MV Agusta F3 675	15	+23.081	16	6
11	21	(France) Florian Marino	Kawasaki ZX-6R	15	+25.585	11	5
12	99	(United States) P. J. Jacobsen	Kawasaki ZX-6R	15	+25.668	12	4
13	35	(Italy) Raffaele De Rosa	Honda CBR600RR	15	+26.094	13	3
14	11	(Italy) Christian Gamarino	Kawasaki ZX-6R	15	+28.026	14	2
15	22	(United Kingdom) Mason Law	Kawasaki ZX-6R	15	+29.868	17	1
16	77	(Qatar) Nasser Al Malki	Honda CBR600RR	15	+48.357	20	
17	161	(Russia) Alexey Ivanov	Yamaha YZF-R6	15	+1:00.928	22	
18	61	(Italy) Fabio Menghi	Yamaha YZF-R6	15	+1:00.968	23	
19	7	(Spain) Nacho Calero	Honda CBR600RR	15	+1:14.126	21	
Ret	15	(Italy) Marco Faccani	Kawasaki ZX-6R	14	Retirement	15	
Ret	87	(Italy) Luca Marconi	Honda CBR600RR	14	Accident	19	
Ret	4	(Republic of Ireland) Jack Kennedy	Honda CBR600RR	4	Retirement	5	
Ret	53	(France) Valentin Debise	Honda CBR600RR	1	Retirement	18	
Report:
