= 2014 Donington Park Superbike World Championship round =

(United Kingdom) 2014 Donington Park Superbike World Championship round
Round details
- Round 5 of 12 rounds in the 2014 Superbike World Championship. and Round 5 of 11 rounds in the 2014 Supersport World Championship.
- Date: 25 May, 2014
- Location: Donington Park
- Course: Permanent racing facility 4.020 km (2.498 mi)

Superbike World Championship
Pole position
(Italy) Davide Giugliano
1:44.903
| Fastest lap race 1 | Fastest lap race 2 |
| (United Kingdom) Tom Sykes | (United Kingdom) Alex Lowes |
| 1:28.779 | 1:28.554 |

Supersport World Championship
Pole position
(Netherlands) Michael Van Der Mark
1:46.220
Fastest lap
(Netherlands) Michael Van Der Mark
1:31.483

The 2014 Donington Park Superbike World Championship round was the fifth round of the 2014 Superbike World Championship. it took place over the weekend of 23–25 May 2014 at the Donington Park located in Leicestershire, England.

== Superbike ==
=== Race 1 classification ===
| Pos | No. | Rider | Bike | Laps | Time | Grid | Points |
|---|---|---|---|---|---|---|---|
| 1 | 1 | (United Kingdom) Tom Sykes | Kawasaki ZX-10R | 23 | 34:23.929 | 7 | 25 |
| 2 | 76 | (France) Loris Baz | Kawasaki ZX-10R | 23 | +1.538 | 6 | 20 |
| 3 | 22 | (United Kingdom) Alex Lowes | Suzuki GSX-R1000 | 23 | +6.394 | 4 | 16 |
| 4 | 33 | (Italy) Marco Melandri | Aprilia RSV4 Factory | 23 | +11.875 | 3 | 13 |
| 5 | 7 | (United Kingdom) Chaz Davies | Ducati 1199 Panigale R | 23 | +14.514 | 11 | 11 |
| 6 | 65 | (United Kingdom) Jonathan Rea | Honda CBR1000RR | 23 | +14.708 | 8 | 10 |
| 7 | 50 | (France) Sylvain Guintoli | Aprilia RSV4 Factory | 23 | +18.483 | 5 | 9 |
| 8 | 91 | (United Kingdom) Leon Haslam | Honda CBR1000RR | 23 | +29.295 | 2 | 8 |
| 9 | 24 | (Spain) Toni Elias | Aprilia RSV4 Factory | 23 | +31.291 | 9 | 7 |
| N/A^{1} | 86 | (Italy) Ayrton Badovini | Bimota BB3 EVO | 23 | +34.130 | 12 | |
| 10 | 44 | (Spain) David Salom | Kawasaki ZX-10R EVO | 23 | +46.953 | 17 | 6 |
| 11 | 59 | (Italy) Niccolò Canepa | Ducati 1199 Panigale R EVO | 23 | +47.170 | 16 | 5 |
| 12 | 9 | (France) Fabien Foret | Kawasaki ZX-10R EVO | 23 | +1:02.583 | 18 | 4 |
| 13 | 11 | (France) Jérémy Guarnoni | Kawasaki ZX-10R EVO | 23 | +1:06.195 | 19 | 3 |
| 14 | 21 | (Italy) Alessandro Andreozzi | Kawasaki ZX-10R EVO | 23 | +1:11.244 | 15 | 2 |
| 15 | 71 | (Italy) Claudio Corti | MV Agusta F4 RR | 23 | +1:12.643 | 14 | 1 |
| 16 | 98 | (France) Romain Lanusse | Kawasaki ZX-10R EVO | 23 | +1:22.209 | 20 | |
| 17 | 20 | (United States) Aaron Yates | EBR 1190RX | 22 | +1 lap | 23 | |
| 18 | 10 | (Hungary) Imre Tóth | BMW S1000RR | 22 | +1 lap | 22 | |
| 19 | 32 | (South Africa) Sheridan Morais | Kawasaki ZX-10R EVO | 21 | +2 lap | 21 | |
| Ret | 34 | (Italy) Davide Giugliano | Ducati 1199 Panigale R | 16 | Retirement | 1 | |
| Ret | 58 | (Republic of Ireland) Eugene Laverty | Suzuki GSX-R1000 | 4 | Accident | 10 | |
| N/A^{1} | 2 | (United Kingdom) Christian Iddon | Bimota BB3 EVO | 4 | Accident | 13 | |
| DNS | 19 | (United Kingdom) Leon Camier | BMW S1000RR EVO | | Did not start | | |
| DNQ | 99 | (United States) Geoff May | EBR 1190RX | | Did not qualify | | |
| DNQ | 56 | (Hungary) Péter Sebestyén | BMW S1000RR EVO | | Did not qualify | | |
| DNQ | 67 | (Australia) Bryan Staring | Kawasaki ZX-10R EVO | | Did not qualify | | |
OFFICIAL SUPERBIKE RACE 1 REPORT

Notes:

- ^1 — Bimota entries were not eligible to score points and were removed from the race results.

=== Race 2 classification ===
| Pos | No. | Rider | Bike | Laps | Time | Grid | Points |
|---|---|---|---|---|---|---|---|
| 1 | 1 | (United Kingdom) Tom Sykes | Kawasaki ZX-10R | 23 | +34.14.134 | 7 | 25 |
| 2 | 76 | (France) Loris Baz | Kawasaki ZX-10R | 23 | +3.678 | 6 | 20 |
| 3 | 50 | (France) Sylvain Guintoli | Aprilia RSV4 Factory | 23 | +7.376 | 5 | 16 |
| 4 | 34 | (Italy) Davide Giugliano | Ducati 1199 Panigale R | 23 | +10.827 | 1 | 13 |
| 5 | 7 | (Italy) Chaz Davies | Ducati 1199 Panigale R | 23 | +15.140 | 11 | 11 |
| 6 | 65 | (United Kingdom) Jonathan Rea | Honda CBR1000RR | 23 | +17.975 | 8 | 10 |
| 7 | 91 | (United Kingdom) Leon Haslam | Honda CBR1000 | 23 | +33.737 | 2 | 9 |
| 8 | 24 | (Spain) Toni Elias | Aprilia RSV4 Factory | 23 | +40.362 | 9 | 8 |
| N/A^{1} | 86 | (Italy) Ayrton Badovini | Bimota BB3 EVO | 23 | +40.579 | 12 | |
| 9 | 22 | (United Kingdom) Alex Lowes | Suzuki GSX-R1000 | 23 | +41.465 | 4 | 7 |
| N/A^{1} | 2 | (United Kingdom) Christian Iddon | Bimota BB3 EVO | 23 | +47.949 | 13 | |
| 10 | 44 | (Spain) David Salom | Kawasaki ZX-10R EVO | 23 | +48.929 | 17 | 6 |
| 11 | 59 | (Italy) Niccolò Canepa | Ducati 1199 Panigale R EVO | 23 | +49.229 | 16 | 5 |
| 12 | 71 | (Italy) Claudio Corti | MV Agusta F4 RR | 23 | +57.984 | 14 | 4 |
| 13 | 58 | (Republic of Ireland) Eugene Laverty | Suzuki GSX-R1000 | 23 | +1:00.751 | 10 | 3 |
| 14 | 11 | (France) Jérémy Guarnoni | Kawasaki ZX-10R EVO | 23 | +1:01.697 | 19 | |
| 15 | 21 | (Italy) Alessandro Andreozzi | Kawasaki ZX-10R EVO | 23 | +1:03.349 | 15 | 1 |
| 16 | 32 | (South Africa) sheridan Morais | Kawasaki ZX-10R EVO | 23 | +1:03.820 | 21 | |
| 17 | 33 | (Italy) Marco Melandri | Aprilia RSV4 Factory | 23 | +1:05.485 | 3 | |
| 18 | 9 | (France) Fabien Foret | Kawasaki ZX-10R EVO | 23 | +1:11.049 | 18 | |
| 19 | 98 | (France) Romain Lanusse | Kawasaki ZX-10R EVO | 23 | +1:15.943 | 20 | |
| 20 | 10 | (Hungary) Imre Tóth | BMW S1000RR | 22 | +1 lap | 22 | |
| Ret | 20 | (United States) Aaron Yates | EBR 1190RX | 9 | Accident | 23 | |
| DNS | 19 | (United Kingdom) Leon Camier | BMW S1000RR EVO | | Did not start | | |
| DNQ | 99 | (United States) Geoff May | EBR 1190RX | | Did not qualify | | |
| DNQ | 56 | (Hungary) Péter Sebestyén | BMW S1000RR EVO | | Did not qualify | | |
| DNQ | 67 | (Australia) Bryan Staring | Kawasaki ZX-10R EVO | | Did not qualify | | |
OFFICIAL SUPERBIKE RACE 2 REPORT

Notes:

- ^1 — Bimota entries were not eligible to score points and were removed from the race results.

== Supersport ==
=== Race classification ===
| Pos | No. | Rider | Bike | Laps | Time | Grid | Points |
|---|---|---|---|---|---|---|---|
| 1 | 60 | (Netherlands) Michael Van Der Mark | Honda CBR600RR | 20 | 30.47.132 | 1 | 25 |
| 2 | 16 | (France) Jules Cluzel | MV Agusta F3 675 | 20 | +0.114 | 8 | 20 |
| 3 | 88 | (United Kingdom) Kev Coghlan | Yamaha YZF-R6 | 20 | +1.266 | 3 | 16 |
| 4 | 54 | (Turkey) Kenan Sofuoğlu | Kawasaki ZX-6R | 20 | +1.556 | 2 | 13 |
| 5 | 21 | (France) Florian Marino | Kawasaki ZX-6R | 20 | +7.472 | 16 | 11 |
| 6 | 99 | (United States) P. J. Jacobsen | Kawasaki ZX-6R | 20 | +10.557 | 4 | 10 |
| 7 | 4 | (Republic of Ireland) Jack Kennedy | Honda CBR600RR | 20 | +13.952 | 18 | 9 |
| 8 | 5 | (Italy) Roberto Tamburini | Kawasaki ZX-6R | 20 | +14.783 | 13 | 8 |
| 9 | 35 | (Italy) Raffaele De Rosa | Honda CBR600RR | 20 | +15.363 | 22 | 7 |
| 10 | 44 | (Italy) Roberto Rolfo | Kawasaki ZX-6R | 20 | +16.585 | 15 | 6 |
| 11 | 24 | (Italy) Marco Bussolotti | Honda CBR600RR | 20 | +22.829 | 5 | 5 |
| 12 | 14 | (Thailand) Ratthapark Wilairot | Honda CBR600RR | 20 | +24.005 | 14 | 4 |
| 13 | 84 | (Italy) Riccardo Russo | Honda CBR600RR | 20 | +38.908 | 9 | 3 |
| 14 | 10 | (Italy) Alessandro Nocco | Kawasaki ZX-6R | 20 | +45.198 | 6 | 2 |
| 15 | 65 | (Russia) Vladimir Leonov | MV Agusta F3 675 | 20 | +46.175 | 11 | 1 |
| 16 | 94 | (United Kingdom) Sam Hornsey | Triumph Daytona 675 | 20 | +54.335 | 10 | |
| 17 | 9 | (Netherlands) Tony Coveña | Kawasaki ZX-6R | 20 | +59.218 | 21 | |
| 18 | 89 | (United Kingdom) Fraser Rogers | Honda CBR600RR | 20 | 1:08.703 | 19 | |
| 19 | 11 | (Italy) Christian Gamarino | Kawasaki ZX-6R | 20 | 1:11.424 | 12 | |
| 20 | 161 | (Russia) Alexey Ivanov | Yamaha YZF-R6 | 19 | +1 lap | 20 | |
| Ret | 26 | (Italy) Lorenzo Zanetti | Kawasaki ZX-6R | 14 | Retirement | 7 | |
| Ret | 61 | (Italy) Fabio Menghi | Yamaha YZF-R6 | 11 | Retirement | 23 | |
| Ret | 19 | (Germany) Kevin Wahr | Yamaha YZF-R6 | 6 | Accident | 17 | |
| DNQ | 7 | (Spain) Nacho Calero | Honda CBR600RR | | Did not qualify | | |
OFFICIAL SUPERSPORT RACE REPORT
