= 2014 Imola Superbike World Championship round =

(Italy) 2014 Imola Superbike World Championship round
Round details
- Round 4 of 12 rounds in the 2014 Superbike World Championship. and Round 4 of 11 rounds in the 2014 Supersport World Championship.
- Date: 11 May, 2014
- Location: Imola
- Course: Permanent racing facility 4.936 km (3.067 mi)

Superbike World Championship
Pole position
(United Kingdom) Jonathan Rea
1:46:289
| Fastest lap race 1 | Fastest lap race 2 |
| (United Kingdom) Jonathan Rea | (United Kingdom) Jonathan Rea |
| 1:47:532 | 1:47.356 |

Supersport World Championship
Pole position
(France) Jules Cluzel
1:51:110
Fastest lap
(Turkey) Kenan Sofuoğlu
1:51:733

The 2014 Imola Superbike World Championship round was the fourth round of the 2014 Superbike World Championship. it took place over the weekend of 9–11 May 2014 at the Autodromo Enzo e Dino Ferrari located in Imola, Italy.

== Superbike ==
=== Race 1 classification ===
| Pos | No. | Rider | Bike | Laps | Time | Grid | Points |
|---|---|---|---|---|---|---|---|
| 1 | 65 | (United Kingdom) Jonathan Rea | Honda CBR1000RR | 19 | 34:14.829 | 1 | 25 |
| 2 | 7 | (United Kingdom) Chaz Davies | Ducati 1199 Panigale R | 19 | +4.511 | 4 | 20 |
| 3 | 1 | (United Kingdom) Tom Sykes | Kawasaki ZX-10R | 19 | +6.492 | 6 | 16 |
| 4 | 76 | (France) Loris Baz | Kawasaki ZX-10R | 19 | +8.434 | 7 | 13 |
| 5 | 50 | (France) Sylvain Guintoli | Aprilia RSV4 Factory | 19 | +9.134 | 2 | 11 |
| 6 | 33 | (Italy) Marco Melandri | Aprilia RSV4 Factory | 19 | +14.925 | 5 | 10 |
| 7 | 58 | (Republic of Ireland) Eugene Laverty | Suzuki GSX-R1000 | 19 | +19.973 | 8 | 9 |
| 8 | 22 | (United Kingdom) Alex Lowes | Suzuki GSX-R1000 | 19 | +21.582 | 12 | 8 |
| 9 | 24 | (Spain) Toni Elias | Aprilia RSV4 Factory | 19 | +28.781 | 15 | 7 |
| 10 | 91 | (United Kingdom) Leon Haslam | Honda CBR1000RR | 19 | +31.245 | 10 | 6 |
| 11 | 19 | (United Kingdom) Leon Camier | BMW S1000RR EVO | 19 | +40.996 | 11 | 5 |
| N/A^{1} | 2 | (United Kingdom) Christian Iddon | Bimota BB3 EVO | 19 | +55.174 | 19 | |
| 12 | 44 | (Spain) David Salom | Kawasaki ZX-10R EVO | 19 | +55.372 | 14 | 4 |
| 13 | 23 | (Italy) Luca Scassa | Kawasaki ZX-10R EVO | 19 | +55.899 | 17 | 3 |
| 14 | 11 | (France) Jérémy Guarnoni | Kawasaki ZX-10R EVO | 19 | +1:04.402 | 24 | 2 |
| 15 | 21 | (Italy) Alessandro Andreozzi | Kawasaki ZX-10R EVO | 19 | +1:23.074 | 23 | 1 |
| 16 | 9 | (France) Fabien Foret | Kawasaki ZX-10R EVO | 19 | +1:23.324 | 22 | |
| 17 | 32 | (South Africa) Sheridan Morais | Kawasaki ZX-10R EVO | 19 | +1:36.763 | 18 | |
| 18 | 71 | (Italy) Claudio Corti | MV Agusta F4 RR | 19 | +1:36.942 | 21 | |
| 19 | 56 | (Hungary) Péter Sebestyén | BMW S1000RR EVO | 19 | 1:43.545 | 28 | |
| 20 | 10 | (Hungary) Imre Tóth | BMW S1000RR | 19 | +1:43.819 | 25 | |
| Ret | 34 | (Italy) Davide Giugliano | Ducati 1199 Panigale R | 11 | Accident | 3 | |
| Ret | 84 | (Italy) Michel Fabrizio | Kawasaki ZX-10R EVO | 8 | Retirement | 20 | |
| Ret | 20 | (United States) Aaron Yates | EBR 1190 RX | 7 | Retirement | 27 | |
| N/A^{1} | 86 | (Italy) Ayrton Badovini | Bimota BB3 EVO | 7 | Retirement | 16 | |
| Ret | 59 | (Italy) Niccolò Canepa | Ducati 1199 Panigale R EVO | 5 | Retirement | 9 | |
| Ret | 112 | (Italy) Ivan Goi | Ducati 1199 Panigale R EVO | 0 | Accident | 13 | |
| DNS | 99 | (United States) Geoff May | EBR 1190 RX | 0 | Did not start | 26 | |
OFFICIAL SUPERBIKE RACE 1 REPORT

Notes:

- ^1 — Bimota entries were not eligible to score points and were removed from the race results.

=== Race 2 classification ===
| Pos | No. | Rider | Bike | Laps | Time | Grid | Points |
|---|---|---|---|---|---|---|---|
| 1 | 65 | (United Kingdom) Jonathan Rea | Honda CBR1000RR | 19 | 34:14.255 | 1 | 25 |
| 2 | 7 | (United Kingdom) Chaz Davies | Ducati 1199 Panigale R | 19 | +4.095 | 4 | 20 |
| 3 | 50 | (France) Sylvain Guintoli | Aprilia RSV4 Factory | 19 | +5.546 | 2 | 16 |
| 4 | 76 | (France) Loris Baz | Kawasaki ZX-10R | 19 | +6.285 | 7 | 13 |
| 5 | 1 | (United Kingdom) Tom Sykes | Kawasaki ZX-10R | 19 | +7.147 | 6 | 11 |
| 6 | 34 | (Italy) Davide Giugliano | Ducati 1199 Panigale R | 19 | +22.054 | 3 | 10 |
| 7 | 24 | (Spain) Toni Elias | Aprilia RSV4 Factory | 19 | +25.811 | 15 | 9 |
| 8 | 91 | (United Kingdom) Leon Haslam | Honda CBR1000RR | 19 | +26.127 | 10 | 8 |
| 9 | 58 | (Republic of Ireland) Eugene Laverty | Suzuki GSX-R1000 | 19 | +26.306 | 8 | 7 |
| 10 | 22 | (United Kingdom) Alex Lowes | Suzuki GSX-R1000 | 19 | +33.046 | 12 | 6 |
| 11 | 33 | (Italy) Marco Melandri | Aprilia RSV4 Factory | 19 | +37.788 | 5 | 5 |
| N/A^{1} | 86 | (Italy) Ayrton Badovini | Bimota BB3 EVO | 19 | +42.284 | 16 | |
| 12 | 19 | (United Kingdom) Leon Camier | BMW S1000RR EVO | 19 | +42.415 | 11 | 4 |
| N/A^{1} | 2 | (United Kingdom) Christian Iddon | Bimota BB3 EVO | 19 | +51.220 | 19 | |
| 13 | 44 | (Spain) David Salom | Kawasaki ZX-10R EVO | 19 | +52.114 | 14 | 3 |
| 14 | 23 | (Italy) Luca Scassa | Kawasaki ZX-10R EVO | 19 | +59.001 | 17 | 2 |
| 15 | 9 | (France) Fabien Foret | Kawasaki ZX-10R EVO | 19 | +1:04.364 | 22 | 1 |
| 16 | 11 | (France) Jérémy Guarnoni | Kawasaki ZX-10R EVO | 19 | +1:18.512 | 24 | |
| 17 | 21 | (Italy) Alessandro Andreozzi | Kawasaki ZX-10R EVO | 19 | +1:34.487 | 23 | |
| 18 | 99 | (United States) Geoff May | EBR 1190 RX | 18 | +1 lap | 26 | |
| 19 | 10 | (Hungary) Imre Tóth | BMW S1000RR | 18 | +1 lap | 25 | |
| Ret | 59 | (Italy) Niccolò Canepa | Ducati 1199 Panigale R EVO | 15 | Retirement | 9 | |
| Ret | 32 | (South Africa) Sheridan Morais | Kawasaki ZX-10R EVO | 10 | Retirement | 18 | |
| Ret | 84 | (Italy) Michel Fabrizio | Kawasaki ZX-10R EVO | 8 | Retirement | 20 | |
| Ret | 56 | (Hungary) Péter Sebestyén | BMW S1000RR EVO | 8 | Accident | 28 | |
| Ret | 20 | (United States) Aaron Yates | EBR 1190 RX | 8 | Retirement | 27 | |
| Ret | 71 | (Italy) Claudio Corti | MV Agusta F4 RR | 6 | Retirement | 21 | |
| DNS | 112 | (Italy) Ivan Goi | Ducati 1199 Panigale R EVO | 0 | Did not start | 13 | |
OFFICIAL SUPERBIKE RACE 2 REPORT

Notes:

- ^1 — Bimota entries were not eligible to score points and were removed from the race results.

== Supersport ==
=== Race classification ===
| Pos | No. | Rider | Bike | Laps | Time | Grid | Points |
|---|---|---|---|---|---|---|---|
| 1 | 26 | (Italy) Lorenzo Zanetti | Honda CBR600RR | 17 | 31:53.543 | 2 | 25 |
| 2 | 60 | (Netherlands) Michael Van Der Mark | Honda CBR600RR | 17 | +2.072 | 6 | 20 |
| 3 | 21 | (France) Florian Marino | Kawasaki ZX-6R | 17 | +6.263 | 8 | 16 |
| 4 | 99 | (United States) P. J. Jacobsen | Kawasaki ZX-6R | 17 | +10.043 | 7 | 13 |
| 5 | 44 | (Italy) Roberto Rolfo | Kawasaki ZX-6R | 17 | +16.366 | 10 | 11 |
| 6 | 61 | (Italy) Fabio Menghi | Yamaha YZF-R6 | 17 | +23.914 | 13 | 10 |
| 7 | 24 | (Italy) Marco Bussolotti | Honda CBR600RR | 17 | +24.060 | 11 | 9 |
| 8 | 84 | (Italy) Riccardo Russo | Honda CBR600RR | 17 | +24.150 | 14 | 8 |
| 9 | 19 | (Germany) Kevin Wahr | Yamaha YZF-R6 | 17 | +24.996 | 12 | 7 |
| 10 | 10 | (Italy) Alessandro Nocco | Kawasaki ZX-6R | 17 | +25.115 | 18 | 6 |
| 11 | 4 | (Republic of Ireland) Jack Kennedy | Honda CBR600RR | 17 | +33.695 | 19 | 5 |
| 12 | 35 | (Italy) Raffaele De Rosa | Honda CBR600RR | 17 | +36.079 | 17 | 4 |
| 13 | 11 | (Italy) Christian Gamarino | Kawasaki ZX-6R | 17 | +39.322 | 16 | 3 |
| 14 | 9 | (Netherlands) Tony Coveña | Kawasaki ZX-6R | 17 | +46.397 | 20 | 2 |
| 15 | 16 | (France) Jules Cluzel | MV Agusta F3 675 | 17 | +54.935 | 1 | 1 |
| 16 | 89 | (United Kingdom) Fraser Rogers | Honda CBR600RR | 17 | +1:07.909 | 23 | |
| 17 | 7 | (Spain) Nacho Calero | Honda CBR600RR | 17 | +1:16.621 | 21 | |
| Ret | 54 | (Turkey) Kenan Sofuoğlu | Kawasaki ZX-6R | 12 | Retirement | 5 | |
| Ret | 161 | (Russia) Alexey Ivanov | Yamaha YZF-R6 | 12 | Retirement | 22 | |
| Ret | 65 | (Russia) Vladimir Leonov | MV Agusta F3 675 | 9 | Retirement | 9 | |
| Ret | 25 | (Italy) Alex Baldolini | MV Agusta F3 675 | 6 | Retirement | 24 | |
| Ret | 88 | (United Kingdom) Kev Coghlan | Yamaha YZF-R6 | 1 | Accident | 3 | |
| Ret | 5 | (Italy) Roberto Tamburini | Kawasaki ZX-6R | 1 | Accident | 4 | |
| Ret | 14 | (Thailand) Ratthapark Wilairot | Honda CBR600RR | 0 | Accident | 15 | |
OFFICIAL SUPERSPORT RACE REPORT

== Superstock ==
=== STK1000 race classification ===
| Pos | No. | Rider | Bike | Laps | Time | Grid | Points |
|---|---|---|---|---|---|---|---|
| 1 | 69 | (Czech Republic) Ondřej Ježek | Ducati 1199 Panigale | 14 | 26:00.349 | 3 | 25 |
| 2 | 43 | (Italy) Fabio Massei | Ducati 1199 Panigale R | 14 | +1.394 | 1 | 20 |
| 3 | 36 | (Argentina) Leandro Mercado | Ducati 1199 Panigale R | 14 | +12.506 | 4 | 16 |
| 4 | 98 | (France) Romain Lanusse | Kawasaki ZX-10R | 14 | +22.812 | 6 | 13 |
| 5 | 4 | (United States) Joshua Day | Honda CBR1000RR | 14 | +31.274 | 7 | 11 |
| 6 | 34 | (Hungary) Balázs Németh' | Kawasaki ZX-10R | 14 | +31.960 | 9 | 10 |
| 7 | 169 | (South Africa) David McFadden | Kawasaki ZX-10R | 14 | +33.357 | 16 | 9 |
| 8 | 5 | (Romania) Robert Mureșan | BMW S1000RR | 14 | +40.829 | 11 | 8 |
| 9 | 41 | (Italy) Federico D'Annunzio | BMW S1000RR | 14 | +42.727 | 5 | 7 |
| 10 | 3 | (Switzerland) Sébastien Suchet | Kawasaki ZX-10R | 14 | +43.049 | 19 | 6 |
| 11 (Note: Drop 2 position.) | 94 | (France) Mathieu Lussiana | Kawasaki ZX-10R | 14 | +43.206 | 12 | 5 |
| 12 | 39 | (France) Randy Pagaud | Kawasaki ZX-10R | 14 | +43.362 | 20 | 4 |
| 13 | 59 | (Denmark) Alex Schacht | Ducati 1199 Panigale R | 14 | +48.419 | 23 | 3 |
| 14 | 28 | (Germany) Marc Moser | Ducati 1199 Panigale R | 14 | +48.650 | 18 | 2 |
| 15 | 15 | (Italy) Simone Grotzkyj | Kawasaki ZX-10R | 14 | +50.731 | 10 | 1 |
| 16 | 11 | (United Kingdom) Kyle Smith | Honda CBR1000RR | 14 | +56.048 | 8 | |
| 17 | 95 | (Austria) Julian Mayer | Kawasaki ZX-10R | 14 | +57.838 | 27 | |
| 18 | 53 | (Spain) Antonio Alarcos | Kawasaki ZX-10R | 14 | +58.698 | 28 | |
| 19 | 93 | (Italy) Alberto Butti | Kawasaki ZX-10R | 14 | +1:02.529 | 21 | |
| 20 | 8 | (France) Jonathan Hardt | Kawasaki ZX-10R | 14 | +1:03.158 | 22 | |
| 21 | 55 | (Slovakia) Tomáš Svitok | Ducati 1199 Panigale R | 14 | +1:23.298 | 25 | |
| 22 | 27 | (Italy) Riccardo Cecchini | BMW S1000RR | 14 | +1:35.221 | 30 | |
| Ret | 90 | (Spain) Javier Alviz | Kawasaki ZX-10R | 10 | Retirement | 26 | |
| Ret | 32 | (Italy) Lorenzo Savadori | Kawasaki ZX-10R | 7 | Retirement | 2 | |
| Ret | 12 | (Switzerland) Jonathan Crea | Kawasaki ZX-10R | 4 | Accident | 24 | |
| Ret | 7 | (Switzerland) Jérémy Ayer | Kawasaki ZX-10R | 4 | Accident | 29 | |
| Ret | 74 | (Italy) Kevin Calia | Aprilia RSV4 APRC | 3 | Accident | 13 | |
| Ret | 18 | (Netherlands) Kevin Valk | Kawasaki ZX-10R | 3 | Accident | 17 | |
| Ret | 16 | (Italy) Remo Castellarin | BMW S1000RR HP4 | 3 | Retirement | 14 | |
| Ret | 6 | (Italy) Denni Schiavoni | BMW S1000RR HP4 | 1 | Accident | 15 | |
OFFICIAL SUPERSTOCK 1000 RACE REPORT
