= 2014 Jerez Superbike World Championship round =

Motorcycle race in Jerez de la Frontera, Spain

(Spain) 2014 Jerez Superbike World Championship round
Round details
- Round 10 of 12 rounds in the 2014 Superbike World Championship. and Round 9 of 11 rounds in the 2014 Supersport World Championship.
- Date: 7 September, 2014
- Location: Jerez
- Course: Permanent racing facility 4.423 km (2.748 mi)

Superbike World Championship
Pole position
(France) Loris Baz
1:40,298
Fastest lap race 1	Fastest lap race 2
(Italy) Davide Giugliano	(France) Sylvain Guintoli
1:41.939	1:42.223

Supersport World Championship
Pole position
(Netherlands) Michael Van Der Mark
1:44.293
Fastest lap
(Turkey) Kenan Sofuoğlu
1:44.849

The 2014 Jerez Superbike World Championship round was the tenth round of the 2014 Superbike World Championship. it took place over the weekend of 5–7 September 2014 at the Circuito de Jerez located in Jerez de la Frontera, Spain.

== Superbike ==
=== Race 1 classification ===
Pos	No.	Rider	Bike	Laps	Time	Grid	Points
1	33	(Italy) Marco Melandri	Aprilia RSV4 Factory	20	34:20.164	4	25
2	50	(France) Sylvain Guintoli	Aprilia RSV4 Factory	20	+1.397	5	20
3	7	(United Kingdom) Chaz Davies	Ducati 1199 Panigale R	20	+4.283	7	16
4	65	(United Kingdom) Jonathan Rea	Honda CBR1000RR	20	+5.705	10	13
5	1	(United Kingdom) Tom Sykes	Kawasaki ZX-10R	20	+6.979	3	11
6	58	(Republic of Ireland) Eugene Laverty	Suzuki GSX-R1000	20	+7.342	6	10
7	91	(United Kingdom) Leon Haslam	Honda CBR1000RR	20	+14.868	8	9
8	24	(Spain) Toni Elias	Aprilia RSV4 Factory	20	+23.853	11	8
9	44	(Spain) David Salom	Kawasaki ZX-10R EVO	20	+25.886	13	7
10	52	(France) Sylvain Barrier	BMW S1000RR EVO	20	+26.536	12	6
11	11	(France) Jérémy Guarnoni	Kawasaki ZX-10R EVO	20	+41.308	17	5
12	21	(Italy) Alessandro Andreozzi	Kawasaki ZX-10R EVO	20	+46.672	15	4
13	32	(South Africa) Sheridan Morais	Kawasaki ZX-10R EVO	20	+48.742	16	3
14	59	(Italy) Niccolò Canepa	Ducati 1199 Panigale R EVO	20	+50.131	14	2
15	71	(Italy) Claudio Corti	MV Agusta F4 RR	20	+1:03.677	19	1
16	16	(Hungary) Gábor Rizmayer	BMW S1000RR EVO	20	+1:14.881	21	
17	99	(United States) Geoff May	EBR 1190 RX	20	+1:22.832	22	
18	10	(Hungary) Imre Tóth	BMW S1000RR	20	+1:35.170	20	
Ret	20	(United States) Aaron Yates	EBR 1190 RX	16	Accident	23	
Ret	76	(France) Loris Baz	Kawaskai ZX-10R	13	Accident	1	
Ret	22	(United Kingdom) Alex Lowes	Suzuki GSX-R1000	13	Retirement	9	
Ret	34	(Italy) Davide Giugliano	Ducati 1199 Panigale R	11	Accident	2	
Ret	67	(Australia) Bryan Staring	Kawasaki ZX-10R EVO	7	Accident	18	
DNS	23	(Italy) Luca Scassa	Kawasaki ZX-10R EVO		Did not start		
Report:

=== Race 2 classification ===
Pos	No.	Rider	Bike	Laps	Time	Grid	Points
1	33	(Italy) Marco Melandri	Aprilia RSV4 Factory	20	34:25.940	4	25
2	50	(France) Sylvain Guintoli	Aprilia RSV4 Factory	20	+2.845	5	20
3	1	(United Kingdom) Tom Sykes	Kawasaki ZX-10R	20	+6.097	3	16
4	7	(United Kingdom) Chaz Davies	Ducati 1199 Panigale R	20	+7.749	7	13
5	65	(United Kingdom) Jonathan Rea	Honda CBR1000RR	20	+7.935	10	11
6	58	(Republic of Ireland) Eugene Laverty	Suzuki GSX-R1000	20	+10.510	6	10
7	76	(France) Loris Baz	Kawasaki ZX-10R	20	+16.078	1	9
8	91	(United Kingdom) Leon Haslam	Honda CBR1000RR	20	+16.098	8	8
9	22	(United Kingdom) Alex Lowes	Suzuki GSX-R1000	20	+16.554	9	7
10	24	(Spain) Toni Elias	Aprilia RSV4 Factory	20	+25.840	11	6
11	52	(France) Sylvain Barrier	BMW S1000RR EVO	20	+36.839	12	5
12	32	(South Africa) Sheridan Morais	Kawasaki ZX-10R EVO	20	+55.531	16	4
13	11	(France) Jérémy Guarnoni	Kawasaki ZX-10R EVO	20	+55.980	17	3
14	16	(Hungary) Gábor Rizmayer	BMW S1000RR EVO	20	+1:18.354	21	2
15	59	(Italy) Niccolò Canepa	Ducati 1199 Panigale R EVO	20	+1:26.338	14	1
16	20	(United States) Aaron Yates	EBR 1190 RX	20	+1:31.468	23	
Ret	21	(Italy) Alessandro Andreozzi	Kawasaki ZX-10R EVO	12	Accident	15	
Ret	10	(Hungary) Imre Tóth	BMW S1000RR	11	Retirement	20	
Ret	99	(United States) Geoff May	EBR 1190 RX	10	Retirement	22	
Ret	71	(Italy) Claudio Corti	MV Agusta F4 RR	6	Retirement	19	
Ret	34	(Italy) Davide Giugliano	Ducati 1199 Panigale R	2	Retirement	2	
Ret	44	(Spain) David Salom	Kawasaki ZX-10R EVO	1	Retirement	13	
DNS	67	(Australia) Bryan Staring	Kawasaki ZX-10R EVO	0	Did not start	18	
DNS	23	(Italy) Luca Scassa	Kawasaki ZX-10R EVO		Did not start		
Report:

== Supersport ==
=== Race classification ===
Pos	No.	Rider	Bike	Laps	Time	Grid	Points
1	60	(Netherlands) Michael Van Der Mark	Honda CBR600RR	19	33:34.503	1	25
2	99	(United States) P. J. Jacobsen	Kawasaki ZX-6R	19	+0.363	4	20
3	21	(France) Florian Marino	Kawasaki ZX-6R	19	+0.508	3	16
4	4	(Republic of Ireland) Jack Kennedy	Honda CBR600RR	19	+0.960	6	13
5	88	(United Kingdom) Kev Coghlan	Yamaha YZF-R6	19	+2.951	10	11
6	26	(Italy) Lorenzo Zanetti	Honda CBR600RR	19	+4.639	2	10
7	44	(Italy) Roberto Rolfo	Kawasaki ZX-6R	19	+5.860	8	9
8	14	(Thailand) Ratthapark Wilairot	Honda CBR600RR	19	+6.460	5	8
9	10	(Italy) Alessandro Nocco	Kawasaki ZX-6R	19	+10.477	12	7
10	5	(Italy) Roberto Tamburini	Kawasaki ZX-6R	19	+10.875	13	6
11	6	(Switzerland) Dominic Schmitter	Yamaha YZF-R6	19	+16.916	11	5
12	65	(Russia) Vladimir Leonov	Honda CBR600RR	19	+18.066	16	4
13	54	(Turkey) Kenan Sofuoğlu	Kawasaki ZX-6R	19	+19.253	26	3
14	53	(France) Valentin Debise	Honda CBR600RR	19	+20.916	17	2
15	11	(Italy) Christian Gamarino	Kawasaki ZX-6R	19	+23.624	15	1
16	57	(Spain) Ferran Casas	Yamaha YZF-R6	19	+28.001	20	
17	61	(Italy) Fabio Menghi	Yamaha YZF-R6	19	+28.392	19	
18	9	(Netherlands) Tony Coveña	Kawasaki ZX-6R	19	+44.443	22	
19	24	(Italy) Marco Bussolotti	Honda CBR600RR	19	+47.116	21	
20	64	(Australia) Matt Davies	Honda CBR600RR	19	+1:05.177	25	
21	161	(Russia) Alexey Ivanov	Yamaha YZF-R6	19	+1:05.265	24	
22	7	(Spain) Nacho Calero	Honda CBR600RR	19	+1:05.737	23	
Ret	87	(Italy) Luca Marconi	Honda CBR600RR	18	Accident	18	
Ret	16	(France) Jules Cluzel	MV Agusta F3 675	17	Accident	9	
Ret	155	(Italy) Massimo Roccoli	MV Agusta F3 675	15	Accident	14	
Ret	35	(Italy) Raffaele De Rosa	Honda CBR600RR	10	Retirement	7	
Report:

== Superstock ==
=== STK1000 race classification ===
Pos	No.	Rider	Bike	Laps	Time	Grid	Points
1	36	(Argentina) Leandro Mercado	Ducati 1199 Panigale R	10	17:47.919	1	25
2	11	(United Kingdom) Kyle Smith	Honda CBR1000RR	10	+1.676	5	20
3	32	(Italy) Lorenzo Savadori	Kawasaki ZX-10R	10	+4.558	2	16
4	43	(Italy) Fabio Massei	Ducati 1199 Panigale R	10	+5.890	3	13
5	69	(Czech Republic) Ondřej Ježek	Ducati 1199 Panigale R	10	+10.338	7	11
6	4	(United States) Joshua Day	Honda CBR1000RR	10	+11.298	13	10
7	169	(South Africa) David McFadden	Kawasaki ZX-10R	10	+12.256	24	9
8	98	(France) Romain Lanusse	Kawasaki ZX-10R	10	+13.300	8	8
9	53	(Spain) Antonio Alarcos	Kawasaki ZX-10R	10	+16.652	16	7
10	5	(Romania) Robert Mureșan	BMW S1000RR	10	+17.623	12	6
11	3	(Switzerland) Sébastien Suchet	Kawasaki ZX-10R	10	+19.292	14	5
12	90	(Spain) Javier Alviz	Kawasaki ZX-10R	10	+19.393	17	4
13	16	(Italy) Remo Castellarin	BMW S1000RR HP4	10	+23.751	18	3
14	23	(Italy) Federico Sandi	BMW S1000RR HP4	10	+23.948	11	2
15	28	(Germany) Marc Moser	Ducati 1199 Panigale R	10	+25.546	15	1
16	39	(France) Randy Pagaud	Kawasaki ZX-10R	10	+25.926	19	
17	12	(Switzerland) Jonathan Crea	Kawasaki ZX-10R	10	+30.791	21	
18	93	(Italy) Alberto Butti	Kawasaki ZX-10R	10	+40.101	22	
19	55	(Slovakia) Tomáš Svitok	Ducati 1199 Panigale R	10	+44.841	20	
20	7	(Switzerland) Jérémy Ayer	Kawasaki ZX-10R	10	+50.992	23	
21	41	(Italy) Federico D'Annunzio	BMW S1000RR HP4	9	+1 lap	10	
Ret	94	(France) Mathieu Lussiana	Kawasaki ZX-10R	3	Accident	4	
Ret	9	(Australia) Jed Metcher	Ducati 1199 Panigale R	0	Accident	9	
Ret	34	(Hungary) Balázs Németh	Kawasaki ZX-10R	0	Accident	6	
Report:
