= 2014 Phillip Island Superbike World Championship round =

(Australia) 2014 Phillip Island Superbike World Championship round
Round details
- Round 1 of 13 rounds in the 2014 Superbike World Championship. and Round 1 of 12 rounds in the 2014 Supersport World Championship.
- Date: 23 February, 2014
- Location: Phillip Island
- Course: Permanent racing facility 4.445 km (2.762 mi)

Superbike World Championship
Pole position
(France) Sylvain Guintoli
1:30.038
Fastest lap race 1	Fastest lap race 2
(United Kingdom) Chaz Davies	(France) Sylvain Guintoli
1:30.949	1:31.421

Supersport World Championship
Pole position
(Turkey) Kenan Sofuoğlu
1:32.769
Fastest lap
(Italy) Roberto Tamburini
1:33.883

The 2014 Phillip Island Superbike World Championship round was the first round of the 2014 Superbike World Championship. It took place over the weekend of 21–23 February 2014 at the Phillip Island Grand Prix Circuit near Cowes, Victoria, Australia.

== Superbike race ==
=== Race 1 classification ===
Pos	No.	Rider	Bike	Laps	Time	Grid	Points
1	58	(Republic of Ireland) Eugene Laverty	Suzuki GSX-R1000	22	30:39.440	4	25
2	33	(Italy) Marco Melandri	Aprilia RSV4 Factory	22	+2.595	3	20
3	50	(France) Sylvain Guintoli	Aprilia RSV4 Factory	22	+3.034	1	16
4	34	(Italy) Davide Giugliano	Ducati 1199 Panigale R	22	+6.972	2	13
5	76	(France) Loris Baz	Kawasaki ZX-10R	22	+11.132	7	11
6	65	(United Kingdom) Jonathan Rea	Honda CBR1000RR	22	+11.718	6	10
7	1	(United Kingdom) Tom Sykes	Kawasaki ZX-10R	22	+15.612	8	9
8	7	(United Kingdom) Chaz Davies	Ducati 1199 Panigale R	22	+25.724	11	8
9	44	(Spain) David Salom	Kawasaki ZX-10R EVO	22	+36.407	12	7
10	59	(Italy) Niccolò Canepa	Ducati 1199 Panigale R EVO	22	+37.468	10	6
11	14	(Australia) Glenn Allerton	BMW S1000RR EVO	22	+39.271	19	5
12	9	(France) Fabien Foret	Kawasaki ZX-10R EVO	22	+45.212	15	4
13	71	(Italy) Claudio Corti	MV Agusta F4 RR	22	+50.249	14	3
14	11	(France) Jérémy Guarnoni	Kawasaki ZX-10R EVO	22	+1:17.134	17	2
15	32	(South Africa) Sheridan Morais	Kawasaki ZX-10R EVO	22	+1:23.686	18	1
16	10	(Hungary) Imre Tóth	BMW S1000RR	22	+1:30.651	20	
17	20	(United States) Aaron Yates	EBR 1190RX	21	+1 lap	21	
Ret	21	(Italy) Alessandro Andreozzi	Kawasaki ZX-10R EVO	14	Accident	16	
Ret	91	(United Kingdom) Leon Haslam	Honda CBR1000RR	4	Accident	9	
Ret	22	(United Kingdom) Alex Lowes	Suzuki GSX-R1000	3	Accident	5	
Ret	24	(Spain) Toni Elías	Aprilia RSV4 Factory	3	Accident	13	
DNS	12	(Australia) Matthew Walters	Kawasaki ZX-10R EVO		Did not start		
DNS	99	(United States) Geoff May	EBR 1190RX		Did not start		
DNQ	56	(Hungary) Péter Sebestyén	BMW S1000RR EVO		Did not qualify		
OFFICIAL SUPERBIKE RACE 1 REPORT

=== Race 2 classification ===
The race was stopped after 14 laps.

Pos	No.	Rider	Bike	Laps	Time	Grid	Points
1	50	(France) Sylvain Guintoli	Aprilia RSV4 Factory	14	21:34.034	1	25
2	76	(France) Loris Baz	Kawasaki ZX-10R	14	+0.283	7	20
3	1	(United Kingdom) Tom Sykes	Kawasaki ZX-10R	14	+1.103	8	16
4	34	(Italy) Davide Giugliano	Ducati 1199 Panigale R	14	+2.052	2	13
5	65	(United Kingdom) Jonathan Rea	Honda CBR1000RR	14	+4.951	6	11
6	91	(United Kingdom) Leon Haslam	Honda CBR1000RR	14	+5.673	9	10
7	7	(United Kingdom) Chaz Davies	Ducati 1199 Panigale R	14	+9.664	11	9
8	33	(Italy) Marco Melandri	Aprilia RSV4 Factory	14	+19.574	3	8
9	24	(Spain) Toni Elías	Aprilia RSV4 Factory	14	+11.682	13	7
10	44	(Spain) David Salom	Kawasaki ZX-10R EVO	14	+15.065	12	6
11	59	(Italy) Niccolò Canepa	Ducati 1199 Panigale R EVO	14	+16.294	10	5
12	9	(France) Fabien Foret	Kawasaki ZX-10R EVO	14	+16.919	15	4
13	22	(United Kingdom) Alex Lowes	Suzuki GSX-R1000	14	+19.694	5	3
14	32	(South Africa) Sheridan Morais	Kawasaki ZX-10R EVO	14	+27.266	18	2
15	14	(Australia) Glenn Allerton	BMW S1000RR EVO	14	+27.845	19	1
16	11	(France) Jérémy Guarnoni	Kawasaki ZX-10R EVO	14	+29.431	17	
17	21	(Italy) Alessandro Andreozzi	Kawasaki ZX-10R EVO	14	+36.393	16	
18	71	(Italy) Claudio Corti	MV Agusta F4 RR	14	+37.018	14	
19	10	(Hungary) Imre Tóth	BMW S1000RR	14	+54.093	20	
20	20	(United States) Aaron Yates	EBR 1190RX	14	+1:13.385	22	
Ret	58	(Republic of Ireland) Eugene Laverty	Suzuki GSX-R1000	14	Technical problem	4	
DNS	12	(Australia) Matthew Walters	Kawasaki ZX-10R EVO		Did not start		
DNS	99	(United States) Geoff May	EBR 1190RX		Did not start		
DNQ	56	(Hungary) Péter Sebestyén	BMW S1000RR EVO		Did not qualify		
OFFICIAL SUPERBIKE RACE 2 REPORT

== Supersport ==
=== Race classification ===
The race was stopped after seven laps and restarted over a distance of five laps.

Pos	No.	Rider	Bike	Laps	Time	Grid	Points
1	16	(France) Jules Cluzel	MV Agusta F3 675	5	7:57.585	13	25
2	88	(United Kingdom) Kev Coghlan	Yamaha YZF-R6	5	+0.224	4	20
3	35	(Italy) Raffaele De Rosa	Honda CBR600RR	5	+0.317	7	16
4	21	(France) Florian Marino	Kawasaki ZX-6R	5	+0.347	10	13
5	5	(Italy) Roberto Tamburini	Kawasaki ZX-6R	5	+0.822	3	11
6	19	(Germany) Kevin Wahr	Yamaha YZF-R6	5	+4.010	12	10
7	81	(United Kingdom) Graeme Gowland	Triumph 675 R	5	+5.282	17	9
8	84	(Italy) Riccardo Russo	Honda CBR600RR	5	+5.310	16	8
9	61	(Italy) Fabio Menghi	Yamaha YZF-R6	5	+5.517	15	7
10	11	(Italy) Christian Gamarino	Kawasaki ZX-6R	5	+5.858	14	6
11	44	(Italy) Roberto Rolfo	Kawasaki ZX-6R	5	+6.491	18	5
12	9	(Netherlands) Tony Coveña	Kawasaki ZX-6R	5	+7.873	19	4
13	7	(Spain) Nacho Calero	Honda CBR600RR	5	+10.163	21	3
14	24	(Italy) Marco Bussolotti	Honda CBR600RR	5	+12.406	20	2
15	89	(United Kingdom) Fraser Rogers	Honda CBR600RR	5	+12.622	22	1
16	52	(Australia) Ryan Taylor	Yamaha YZF-R6	5	+12.845	23	
17	161	(Russia) Alexey Ivanov	Yamaha YZF-R6	5	+12.892	24	
Ret	14	(Thailand) Ratthapark Wilairot	Honda CBR600RR	3	Accident	8	
Ret	67	(Australia) Bryan Staring	Honda CBR600RR	2	Retired	9	
Ret	60	(Netherlands) Michael van der Mark	Honda CBR600RR	2	Accident	2	
Ret	54	(Turkey) Kenan Sofuoğlu	Kawasaki ZX-6R	1	Accident	1	
Ret	3	(Australia) Billy McConnell	Triumph 675 R	0	Retired	11	
Ret	4	(Republic of Ireland) Jack Kennedy	Honda CBR600RR		Retired in 1st part	25	
Ret	99	(United States) Patrick Jacobsen	Kawasaki ZX-6R		Retired in 1st part	5	
Ret	65	(Russia) Vladimir Leonov	MV Agusta F3 675		Accident in 1st part	6	
DNS	26	(Italy) Lorenzo Zanetti	Honda CBR600RR		Did not start		
OFFICIAL SUPERBIKE REPORT

== Standings after the race ==
Riders' Championship standings

Pos	Rider	Points
1	Sylvain Guintoli	41
2	Loris Baz	31
3	Marco Melandri	28
4	Davide Giugliano	26
5	Eugene Laverty	25

Manufacturers' Championship standings

Pos	Manufacturer	Points
1	Aprilia	45
2	Kawasaki	31
3	Suzuki	28
4	Ducati	26
5	Honda	21
