= 2014 Magny-Cours Superbike World Championship round =

(France) 2014 Magny-Cours Superbike World Championship round
Round details
- Round 11 of 12 rounds in the 2014 Superbike World Championship. and Round 10 of 11 rounds in the 2014 Supersport World Championship.
- Date: 5 October, 2014
- Location: Magny-Cours
- Course: Permanent racing facility 4.411 km (2.741 mi)

Superbike World Championship
Pole position
(United Kingdom) Tom Sykes
1:36.366
Fastest lap race 1	Fastest lap race 2
(Italy) Marco Melandri	(France) Sylvain Guintoli
1:54.013	1:53.660

Supersport World Championship
Pole position
(France) Jules Cluzel
1:40.550
Fastest lap
(Turkey) Kenan Sofuoğlu
1:56.887

The 2014 Magny-Cours Superbike World Championship round was the eleventh and penultimate round of the 2014 Superbike World Championship. It took place over the weekend of 3–5 October 2014 at the Circuit de Nevers Magny-Cours located in Magny-Cours, France.

== Superbike ==
=== Race 1 classification ===
Pos	No.	Rider	Bike	Laps	Time	Grid	Points
1	50	(France) Sylvain Guintoli	Aprilia RSV4 Factory	19	36:45.206	5	25
2	33	(Italy) Marco Melandri	Aprilia RSV4 Factory	19	+2.257	6	20
3	65	(United Kingdom) Jonathan Rea	Honda CBR1000RR	19	+5.954	3	16
4	1	(United Kingdom) Tom Sykes	Kawasaki ZX-10R	19	+15.670	1	13
5	76	(France) Loris Baz	Kawasaki ZX-10R	19	+16.149	7	11
6	91	(United Kingdom) Leon Haslam	Honda CBR1000RR	19	+29.411	10	10
7	34	(Italy) Davide Giugliano	Ducati 1199 Panigale R	19	+57.319	2	9
8	57	(Italy) Lorenzo Lanzi	Ducati 1199 Panigale R	19	+59.306	15	8
9	27	(Germany) Max Neukirchner	Ducati 1199 Panigale R	19	+1:12.274	12	7
10	52	(France) Sylvain Barrier	BMW S1000RR EVO	19	+1:22.931	13	6
11	59	(Italy) Niccolò Canepa	Ducati 1199 Panigale R EVO	19	+1:39.670	16	5
12	11	(France) Jérémy Guarnoni	Kawasaki ZX-10R EVO	19	+1:42.886	20	4
13	71	(Italy) Claudio Corti	MV Agusta F4 RR	19	+2:03.253	17	3
14	67	(Australia) Bryan Staring	Kawasaki ZX-10R EVO	18	+1 lap	22	2
15	9	(France) Fabien Foret	Kawasaki ZX-10R EVO	18	+1 lap	19	1
16	74	(France) Nicolas Salchaud	MV Agusta F4 RR	18	+1 lap	26	
17	32	(South Africa) Sheridan Morais	Kawasaki ZX-10R EVO	17	+2 lap	18	
18	99	(United States) Geoff May	EBR 1190 RX	17	+2 lap	27	
19	58	(Republic of Ireland) Eugene Laverty	Suzuki GSX-R1000	17	+2 lap	9	
20	10	(Hungary) Imre Tóth	BMW S1000RR	16	+3 lap	24	
Ret	16	(Hungary) Gábor Rizmayer	BMW S1000RR EVO	7	Accident	25	
Ret	20	(United States) Aaron Yates	EBR 1190 RX	7	Retirement	23	
Ret	212	(Spain) Xavi Forés	Ducati 1199 Panigale R	5	Accident	11	
Ret	21	(Italy) Alessandro Andreozzi	Kawasaki ZX-10R EVO	3	Accident	21	
Ret	24	(Spain) Toni Elias	Aprilia RSV4 Factory	2	Accident	14	
Ret	22	(United Kingdom) Alex Lowes	Suzuki GSX-R1000	2	Retirement	8	
Ret	7	(United Kingdom) Chaz Davies	Ducati 1199 Panigale R	1	Accident	4	
DNS	44	(Spain) David Salom	Kawasaki ZX-10R EVO		Did not start		
Report:

=== Race 2 classification ===
Pos	No.	Rider	Bike	Laps	Time	Grid	Points
1	33	(Italy) Marco Melandri	Aprilia RSV4 Factory	19	36:25.402	6	25
2	50	(France) Sylvain Guintoli	Aprilia RSV4 Factory	19	+2.669	5	20
3	91	(United Kingdom) Leon Haslam	Honda CBR1000RR	19	+16.450	10	16
4	1	(United Kingdom) Tom Sykes	Kawasaki ZX-10R	19	+20.759	1	13
5	57	(Italy) Lorenzo Lanzi	Ducati 1199 Panigale R	19	+46.689	15	11
6	27	(Germany) Max Neukirchner	Ducati 1199 Panigale R	19	+58.490	12	10
7	76	(France) Loris Baz	Kawasaki ZX-10R	19	+1:03.100	7	9
8	71	(Italy) Claudio Corti	MV Agusta F4 RR	19	+1:24.699	17	8
9	7	(United Kingdom) Chaz Davies	Ducati 1199 Panigale R	19	+1:27.899	4	7
10	59	(Italy) Niccolò Canepa	Ducati 1199 Panigale R EVO	19	+1:51.706	16	6
11	9	(France) Fabien Foret	Kawasaki ZX-10R EVO	18	+1 lap	19	5
12	16	(Hungary) Gábor Rizmayer	BMW S1000RR EVO	17	+2 lap	25	4
13	10	(Hungary) Imre Tóth	BMW S1000RR	17	+2 lap	24	3
Ret	67	(Australia) Bryan Staring	Kawasaki ZX-10R EVO	16	Accident	22	
Ret	58	(Republic of Ireland) Eugene Laverty	Suzuki GSX-R1000	14	Accident	9	
Ret	212	(Spain) Xavi Forés	Ducati 1199 Panigale R	12	Retirement	11	
Ret	11	(France) Jérémy Guarnoni	Kawasaki ZX-10R EVO	12	Retirement	20	
Ret	65	(United Kingdom) Jonathan Rea	Honda CBR1000RR	11	Retirement	3	
Ret	52	(France) Sylvain Barrier	BMW S1000RR EVO	6	Accident	13	
Ret	32	(South Africa) Sheridan Morais	Kawasaki ZX-10R EVO	4	Retirement	18	
Ret	34	(Italy) Davide Giugliano	Ducati 1199 Panigale R	3	Retirement	2	
Ret	99	(United States) Geoff May	EBR 1190 RX	2	Retirement	27	
Ret	22	(United Kingdom) Alex Lowes	Suzuki GSX-R1000	1	Accident	8	
Ret	20	(United States) Aaron Yates	EBR 1190 RX	1	Retirement	23	
Ret	24	(Spain) Toni Elias	Aprilia RSV4 Factory	0	Retirement	14	
Ret	74	(France) Nicolas Salchaud	MV Agusta F4 RR	0	Retirement	26	
DNS	21	(Italy) Alessandro Andreozzi	Kawasaki ZX-10R EVO	0	Did not start	21	
DNS	44	(Spain) David Salom	Kawasaki ZX-10R EVO		Did not start		
Report:

== Supersport ==
=== Race classification ===
The race was stopped at lap 12 after the air fences at turn 7 was by Lucas Mahias who crashed his Yamaha YZF-R6 at that corner, as the 2/3 distance was completed the race wasn't resumed and the full points were given.

Pos	No.	Rider	Bike	Laps	Time	Grid	Points
1	16	(France) Jules Cluzel	MV Agusta F3 675	12	23:54.426	1	25
2	60	(Netherlands) Michael Van Der Mark	Honda CBR600RR	12	+20.274	4	20
3	44	(Italy) Roberto Rolfo	Kawasaki ZX-6R	12	+24.232	17	16
4	26	(Italy) Lorenzo Zanetti	Honda CBR600RR	12	+24.911	10	13
5	21	(France) Florian Marino	Kawasaki ZX-6R	12	+26.599	8	11
6	88	(United Kingdom) Kev Coghlan	Yamaha YZF-R6	12	+26.860	11	10
7	5	(Italy) Roberto Tamburini	Kawasaki ZX-6R	12	+28.110	5	9
8	99	(United States) P. J. Jacobsen	Kawasaki ZX-6R	12	+29.777	6	8
9	14	(Thailand) Ratthapark Wilairot	Honda CBR600RR	12	+53.463	13	7
10	6	(Switzerland) Dominic Schmitter	Yamaha YZF-R6	12	+54.266	14	6
11	87	(Italy) Luca Marconi	Honda CBR600RR	12	+57.226	19	5
12	22	(United Kingdom) Mason Law	Kawasaki ZX-6R	12	+1:07.547	22	4
13	64	(Australia) Matt Davies	Honda CBR600RR	12	+1:10.889	26	3
14	11	(Italy) Christian Gamarino	Kawasaki ZX-6R	12	+1:20.101	25	2
15	155	(Italy) Massimo Roccoli	MV Agusta F3 675	12	+1:27.838	7	1
16	36	(Colombia) Martín Cárdenas	Honda CBR600RR	12	+1:38.961	23	
17	53	(France) Valentin Debise	Honda CBR600RR	11	+1 lap	21	
18	7	(Spain) Nacho Calero	Honda CBR600RR	11	+1 lap	24	
Ret	54	(Turkey) Kenan Sofuoğlu	Kawasaki ZX-6R	8	Accident	3	
Ret	17	(France) Lucas Mahias	Yamaha YZF-R6	7	Retirement	2	
Ret	4	(Republic of Ireland) Jack Kennedy	Honda CBR600RR	6	Accident	9	
Ret	65	(Russia) Vladimir Leonov	Honda CBR600RR	3	Accident	15	
Ret	25	(Italy) Alex Baldolini	Honda CBR600RR	3	Accident	16	
Ret	161	(Russia) Alexey Ivanov	Yamaha YZF-R6	2	Retirement	27	
Ret	19	(Germany) Kevin Wahr	Yamaha YZF-R6	1	Retirement	18	
Ret	10	(Italy) Alessandro Nocco	Kawasaki ZX-6R	0	Accident	12	
Ret	23	(France) Cédric Tangre	Suzuki GSX-R600	0	Accident	20	
Ret	61	(Italy) Fabio Menghi	Yamaha YZF-R6	0	Accident	28	
Report:

== Superstock ==
=== STK1000 race classification ===
Pos	No.	Rider	Bike	Laps	Time	Grid	Points
1	94	(France) Mathieu Lussiana	Kawasaki ZX-10R	15	30:10.266	6	25
2	98	(France) Romain Lanusse	Kawasaki ZX-10R	15	+7.926	14	20
3	9	(Australia) Jed Metcher	Ducati 1199 Panigale R	15	+18.507	13	16
4	36	(Argentina) Leandro Mercado	Ducati 1199 Panigale R	15	+20.631	11	13
5	23	(Italy) Federico Sandi	BMW S1000RR HP4	15	+24.999	7	11
6	32	(Italy) Lorenzo Savadori	Kawasaki ZX-10R	15	+26.176	1	10
7	24	(France) Stéphane Egea	Kawasaki ZX-10R	15	+37.830	12	9
8	18	(Netherlands) Kevin Valk	Kawasaki ZX-10R	15	+42.062	16	8
9	169	(South Africa) David McFadden	Kawasaki ZX-10R	15	+43.495	9	7
10	41	(Italy) Federico D'Annunzio	BMW S1000RR HP4	15	+1:07.763	10	6
11	3	(Switzerland) Sébastien Suchet	Kawasaki ZX-10R	15	+1:16.631	5	5
12	7	(Switzerland) Jérémy Ayer	Kawasaki ZX-10R	15	+1:17.032	27	4
13	90	(Spain) Javier Alviz	Kawasaki ZX-10R	15	+1:20.920	25	3
14	89	(France) Axel Maurin	Kawasaki ZX-10R	15	+1:25.755	15	2
15	28	(Germany) Marc Moser	Ducati 1199 Panigale R	14	+1 lap	19	1
DSQ	70	(France) Romain Maitre	Suzuki GSX-R1000	15	(+42.235)	17	
Ret	39	(France) Randy Pagaud	Kawasaki ZX-10R	14	Accident	18	
Ret	16	(Italy) Remo Castellarin	BMW S1000RR HP4	12	Retirement	23	
Ret	4	(United States) Joshua Day	Honda CBR1000RR	10	Accident	21	
Ret	5	(Romania) Robert Mureșan	BMW S1000RR	8	Retirement	8	
Ret	53	(Spain) Antonio Alarcos	Kawasaki ZX-10R	5	Accident	20	
Ret	43	(Italy) Fabio Massei	Ducati 1199 Panigale R	4	Accident	3	
Ret	69	(Czech Republic) Ondřej Ježek	Ducati 1199 Panigale R	3	Accident	2	
Ret	51	(Switzerland) Eric Vionnet	BMW S1000RR	1	Accident	22	
Ret	12	(Switzerland) Jonathan Crea	Kawasaki ZX-10R	1	Accident	26	
Ret	93	(Italy) Alberto Butti	Kawasaki ZX-10R	1	Accident	24	
Ret	11	(United Kingdom) Kyle Smith	Honda CBR1000RR	1	Retirement	4	
Report:
