= 2014 Laguna Seca Superbike World Championship round =

(United States) 2014 Laguna Seca Superbike World Championship round
Round details
- Round 9 of 12 rounds in the 2014 Superbike World Championship.
- Date: 13 July, 2014
- Location: Laguna Seca
- Course: Permanent racing facility 3.602 km (2.238 mi)

Superbike World Championship
Pole position
(United Kingdom) Tom Sykes
1:21.811
Fastest lap race 1	Fastest lap race 2
(France) Sylvain Guintoli	(Italy) Davide Giugliano
1:23.559	1:23.4043

The 2014 Laguna Seca Superbike World Championship round was the ninth round of the 2014 Superbike World Championship. it took place over the weekend of 11–13 July 2014 at the Laguna Seca located in Monterey County, United States.

== Superbike ==
=== Race 1 Classification ===
Pos	No.	Rider	Bike	Laps	Time	Grid	Points
1	33	(Italy) Marco Melandri	Aprilia RSV4 Factory	25	35:07.782	5	25
2	50	(France) Sylvain Guintoli	Aprilia RSV4 Factory	25	+0.905	2	20
3	1	(United Kingdom) Tom Sykes	Kawasaki Ninja ZX-10R	25	+6.627	1	16
4	34	(Italy) Davide Giugliano	Ducati 1199 Panigale R	25	+13.574	4	13
5	24	(Spain) Toni Elias	Aprilia RSV4 Factory	25	+13.855	9	11
6	65	(United Kingdom) Jonathan Rea	Honda CBR1000RR	25	+15.575	10	10
7	91	(United Kingdom) Leon Haslam	Honda CBR1000RR	25	+18.820	7	9
8	22	(United Kingdom) Alex Lowes	Suzuki GSX-R1000	25	+20.184	11	8
9	76	(France) Loris Baz	Kawasaki ZX-10R	25	+34.479	8	7
10	44	(Spain) David Salom	Kawasaki ZX-10R EVO	25	+37.463	15	6
11	59	(Italy) Niccolò Canepa	Ducati 1199 Panigale R EVO	25	+45.440	12	5
12	52	(France) Sylvain Barrier	BMW S1000RR EVO	25	+47.538	13	4
N/A^{1}	2	(United Kingdom) Christian Iddon	Bimota BB3 EVO	25	+48.321	14	
13	67	(Australia) Bryan Staring	Kawasaki ZX-10R	25	+49.750	17	3
14	11	(France) Jérémy Guarnoni	Kawasaki ZX-10R EVO	25	+55.420	21	2
15	19	(United Kingdom) Leon Camier	MV Agusta F4 RR	25	+58.449	19	1
16	21	(Italy) Alessandro Andreozzi	Kawasaki ZX-10R EVO	25	+1:08.922	20	
17	16	(Hungary) Gábor Rizmayer	BMW S1000RR	25	+1:17.853	24	
18	99	(United States) Geoff May	EBR 1190 RX	25	+1:18.084	22	
19	18	(United States) Chris Ulrich	Honda CBR1000RR	24	+1 lap	26	
20	32	(South Africa) Sheridan Morais	Kawasaki ZX-10R EVO	22	+3 lap	18	
Ret	72	(United States) Larry Pegram	EBR 1190 RX	22	Retirement	23	
Ret	56	(Hungary) Péter Sebestyén	BMW S1000RR EVO	15	Accident	27	
Ret	20	(United States) Aaron Yates	EBR 1190 RX	13	Retirement	25	
Ret	58	(Republic of Ireland) Eugene Laverty	Suzuki GSX-R1000	7	Retirement	6	
N/A^{1}	86	(Italy) Ayrton Badovini	Bimota BB3 EVO	7	Retirement	16	
Ret	7	(United Kingdom) Chaz Davies	Ducati 1199 Panigale R	1	Accident	3	
OFFICIAL SUPERBIKE RACE 1 REPORT

Notes:

- ^1 — Bimota entries were not eligible to score points and were removed from the race results.

=== Race 2 Classification ===
The race was stopped after ten laps after Alex Lowes suffered a crash at the famous "Corkscrew" corner. The race was later restarted, with the distance shortened to 7 laps. The first restart attempt was also red flagged after 3 laps completed after Sylvain Barrier crashed heavily at the start/finish straight. The race was later restarted, with the distance the same as the first restart attempt.

Pos	No.	Rider	Bike	Laps	Time	Grid	Points
1	1	(United Kingdom) Tom Sykes	Kawasaki ZX-10R	7	9:51.346	1	25
2	50	(France) Sylvain Guintoli	Aprilia RSV4 Factory	7	+1.104	2	20
3	65	(United Kingdom) Jonathan Rea	Honda CBR1000RR	7	+2.793	9	16
4	58	(Republic of Ireland) Eugene Laverty	Suzuki GSX-R1000	7	+3.681	5	13
5	24	(Spain) Toni Elias	Aprilia RSV4 Factory	7	+4.165	8	11
6	76	(France) Loris Baz	Kawasaki ZX-10R	7	+7.160	7	10
7	91	(United Kingdom) Leon Haslam	Honda CBR1000RR	7	+7.331	6	9
N/A^{1}	86	(Italy) Ayrton Badovini	Bimota BB3 EVO	7	+14.560	15	
N/A^{1}	2	(United Kingdom) Christian Iddon	Bimota BB3 EVO	7	+14.892	13	
8	44	(Spain) David Salom	Kawasaki ZX-10R EVO	7	+15.061	14	8
9	21	(Italy) Alessandro Andreozzi	Kawasaki ZX-10R EVO	7	+15.674	19	7
10	19	(United Kingdom) Leon Camier	MV Agusta F4 RR	7	+17.015	18	6
11	11	(France) Jérémy Guarnoni	Kawasaki ZX-10R EVO	7	+18.338	20	5
12	67	(Australia) Bryan Staring	Kawasaki ZX-10R EVO	7	+19.270	16	4
13	32	(South Africa) Sheridan Morais	Kawasaki ZX-10R EVO	7	+20.040	17	3
14	72	(United States) Larry Pegram	EBR 1190 RX	7	+23.845	22	2
15	16	(Hungary) Gábor Rizmayer	BMW S1000RR	7	+25.592	23	1
16	99	(United States) Geoff May	EBR 1190 RX	7	+26.688	21	
17	18	(United States) Chris Ulrich	Honda CBR1000RR	7	+31.893	24	
Ret	34	(Italy) Davide Giugliano	Ducati 1199 Panigale R	2	Retirement	3	
Ret	33	(Italy) Marco Melandri	Aprilia RSV4 Factory	2	Retirement	4	
Ret	59	(Italy) Niccolò Canepa	Ducati 1199 Panigale R EVO	0	Retirement	11	
DNS	52	(France) Sylvain Barrier	BMW S1000RR EVO	0	Accident (First restart attempt)	12	
DNS	22	(United Kingdom) Alex Lowes	Suzuki GSX-R1000	0	Accident (Original attempt)	10	
DNS	7	(United Kingdom) Chaz Davies	Ducati 1199 Panigale R		Did not start		
DNS	20	(United States) Aaron Yates	EBR 1190 RX		Did not start		
DNS	56	(Hungary) Péter Sebestyén	BMW S1000RR EVO		Did not start		
OFFICIAL SUPERBIKE RACE 2 REPORT
