= 2014 Portimão Superbike World Championship round =

(Portugal) 2014 Portimão Superbike World Championship round
Round details
- Round 8 of 12 rounds in the 2014 Superbike World Championship. and Round 8 of 11 rounds in the 2014 Supersport World Championship.
- Date: 6 July, 2014
- Location: Portimão
- Course: Permanent racing facility 4.592 km (2.853 mi)

Superbike World Championship
Pole position
(United Kingdom) Tom Sykes
1:42.484
Fastest lap race 1	Fastest lap race 2
(United Kingdom) Tom Sykes	(United Kingdom) Chaz Davies
1:43.167	1:54.118

Supersport World Championship
Pole position
(Turkey) Kenan Sofuoğlu
1:45.924
Fastest lap
(Netherlands) Michael Van Der Mark
1:45.777

The 2014 Portimão Superbike World Championship round was the eight round of the 2014 Superbike World Championship. it took place over the weekend of 4–6 July 2014 at the Algarve International Circuit located in Portimão, Portugal.

== Superbike ==
=== Race 1 classification ===
Pos	No.	Rider	Bike	Laps	Time	Grid	Points
1	1	(United Kingdom) Tom Sykes	Kawasaki ZX-10R	20	34:45.568	1	25
2	50	(France) Sylvain Guintoli	Aprilia RSV4 Factory	20	+2.539	6	20
3	76	(France) Loris Baz	Kawasaki ZX-10R	20	+3.175	5	16
4	33	(Italy) Marco Melandri	Aprilia RSV4 Factory	20	+4.042	4	13
5	65	(United Kingdom) Jonathan Rea	Honda CBR1000RR	20	+7.791	2	11
6	22	(United Kingdom) Alex Lowes	Suzuki GSX-R1000	20	+14.772	11	10
7	34	(Italy) Davide Giugliano	Ducati 1199 Panigale R	20	+14.877	8	9
8	58	(Republic of Ireland) Eugene Laverty	Suzuki GSX-R1000	20	+14.941	7	8
9	44	(Spain) David Salom	Kawasaki ZX-10R EVO	20	+26.018	12	7
10	52	(France) Sylvain Barrier	BMW S1000RR EVO	20	+26.032	10	6
11	91	(United Kingdom) Leon Haslam	Honda CBR1000RR	20	+33.041	9	5
N/A^{1}	86	(Italy) Ayrton Badovini	Bimota BB3 EVO	20	+34.442	13	
N/A^{1}	2	(United Kingdom) Christian Iddon	Bimota BB3 EVO	20	+38.246	15	
12	11	(France) Jérémy Guarnoni	Kawasaki ZX-10R EVO	20	+38.385	21	4
13	59	(Italy) Niccolò Canepa	Ducati 1199 Panigale R EVO	20	+42.237	14	3
14	48	(Italy) Riccardo Russo	Kawasaki ZX-10R EVO	20	+47.908	20	2
15	21	(Italy) Alessandro Andreozzi	Kawasaki ZX-10R EVO	20	+1:03.502	18	1
16	20	(United States) Aaron Yates	EBR 1190 RX	19	+1 lap	25	
17	16	(Hungary) Gábor Rizmayer	BMW S1000RR	19	+1 lap	24	
18	7	(United Kingdom) Chaz Davies	Ducati 1199 Panigale R	15	+5 lap	3	
NC	67	(Australia) Bryan Staring	Kawasaki ZX-10R EVO	13	Retirement	17	
Ret	56	(Hungary) Péter Sebestyén	BMW S1000RR EVO	12	Retirement	26	
Ret	32	(South Africa) Sheridan Morais	Kawasaki ZX-10R EVO	6	Retirement	16	
Ret	24	(Spain) Toni Elias	Aprilia RSV4 Factory	5	Retirement	19	
Ret	9	(France) Fabien Foret	Kawasaki ZX-10R EVO	4	Retirement	22	
Ret	99	(United States) Geoff May	EBR 1190 RX	4	Retirement	23	
DNS	71	(Italy) Claudio Corti	MV Agusta F4 RR		Did not start		
OFFICIAL SUPERBIKE RACE 1 REPORT

Notes:

- ^1 — Bimota entries were not eligible to score points and were removed from the race results.

=== Race 2 classification ===
Pos	No.	Rider	Bike	Laps	Time	Grid	Points
1	65	(United Kingdom) Jonathan Rea	Honda CBR1000RR	18	34:55.154	2	25
2	34	(Italy) Davide Giugliano	Ducati 1199 Panigale R	18	+6.817	8	20
3	7	(United Kingdom) Chaz Davies	Ducati 1199 Panigale R	18	+8.676	3	16
4	22	(United Kingdom) Alex Lowes	Suzuki GSX-R1000	18	+9.740	11	13
5	91	(United Kingdom) Leon Haslam	Honda CBR1000RR	18	+11.289	9	11
6	76	(France) Loris Baz	Kawasaki ZX-10R	18	+11.808	5	10
7	50	(France) Sylvain Guintoli	Aprilia RSV4 Factory	18	+14.169	6	9
8	1	(United Kingdom) Tom Sykes	Kawasaki ZX-10R	18	+17.164	1	8
N/A^{1}	86	(Italy) Ayrton Badovini	Bimota BB3	18	26.263	13	
9	58	(Republic of Ireland) Eugene Laverty	Suzuki GSX-R1000	18	+26.406	7	7
10	24	(Spain) Toni Elias	Aprilia RSV4 Factory	18	+30.168	19	6
N/A^{1}	2	(United Kingdom) Christian Iddon	Bimota BB3 EVO	18	+33.831	15	
11	52	(France) Sylvain Barrier	BMW S1000RR EVO	18	+41.820	10	5
12	32	(South Africa) Sheridan Morais	Kawasaki ZX-10R EVO	18	+47.434	16	4
13	11	(France) Jérémy Guarnoni	Kawasaki ZX-10R EVO	18	+50.045	21	3
14	67	(Australia) Bryan Staring	Kawasaki ZX-10R EVO'	18	+1:17.436	17	2
15	48	(Italy) Riccardo Russo	Kawasaki ZX-10R EVO	18	+1:24.500	20	1
16	21	(Italy) Alessandro Andreozzi	Kawasaki ZX-10R EVO	18	+1:30.563		
17	44	(Spain) David Salom	Kawasaki ZX-10R EVO	18	+1:34.242	12	
18	59	(Italy) Niccolò Canepa	Ducati 1199 Panigale R EVO	18	+1:34.647	14	
19	16	(Hungary) Gábor Rizmayer	BMW S1000RR	18	1:47.422	23	
Ret	33	(Italy) Marco Melandri	Aprilia RSV4 Factory	12	Accident	4	
Ret	99	(United States) Geoff May	EBR 1190 RX	6	Retirement	22	
Ret	20	(United States) Aaron Yates	EBR 1190 RX	0	Retirement	24	
DNS	56	(Hungary) Péter Sebestyén	BMW S1000RR EVO	0	Did not start	25	
DNS	9	(France) Fabien Foret	Kawasaki ZX-10R EVO		Did not start		
DNS	71	(Italy) Claudio Corti	MV Agusta F4 RR		Did not start		
OFFICIAL SUPERBIKE RACE 2 REPORT

Notes:

- ^1 — Bimota entries were not eligible to score points and were removed from the race results

== Supersport ==
=== Race classification ===
Pos	No.	Rider	Bike	Laps	Time	Grid	Points
1	60	(Netherlands) Michael Van Der Mark	Honda CBR600RR	12	21:15.438	2	25
2	4	(Republic of Ireland) Jack Kennedy	Honda CBR600RR	12	+1.649	4	20
3	54	(Turkey) Kenan Sofuoğlu	Kawasaki ZX-6R	12	+1.961	1	16
4	35	(Italy) Raffaele De Rosa	Honda CBR600RR	12	+8.042	5	13
5	99	(United States) P. J. Jacobsen	Kawasaki ZX-6R	12	+8.095	8	11
6	26	(Italy) Lorenzo Zanetti	Honda CBR600RR	12	+8.538	6	10
7	88	(United Kingdom) Kev Coghlan	Yamaha YZF-R6	12	+11.045	7	9
8	21	(France) Florian Marino	Kawasaki ZX-6R	12	+11.847	9	8
9	44	(Italy) Roberto Rolfo	Kawasaki ZX-6R	12	+12.624	12	7
10	155	(Italy) Massimo Roccoli	MV Agusta F3 675	12	+15.448	10	6
11	14	(Thailand) Ratthapark Wilairot	Honda CBR600RR	12	+17.152	23	5
12	10	(Italy) Alessandro Nocco	Kawasaki ZX-6R	12	+24.774	20	4
13	24	(Italy) Marco Bussolotti	Honda CBR600RR	12	+24.839	13	3
14	53	(France) Valentin Debise	Honda CBR600RR	12	+25.022	14	2
15	61	(Italy) Fabio Menghi	Yamaha YZF-R6	12	+25.238	15	1
16	87	(Italy) Luca Marconi	Honda CBR600RR	12	+26.844	17	
17	11	(Italy) Christian Gamarino	Kawasaki ZX-6R	12	+27.798	18	
18	9	(Netherlands) Tony Coveña	Kawasaki ZX-6R	12	+32.353	19	
19	161	(Russia) Alexey Ivanov	Yamaha YZF-R6	12	+57.594	22	
20	7	(Spain) Nacho Calero	Honda CBR600RR	12	+1:01.481	21	
Ret	16	(France) Jules Cluzel	MV Agusta F3 675	12	Retirement	3	
Ret	5	(Italy) Roberto Tamburini	Kawasaki ZX-6R	9	Retirement	11	
Ret	25	(Italy) Alex Baldolini	MV Agusta F3 675	0	Retirement	16	
OFFICIAL SUPERSPORT RACE REPORT

== Superstock ==
=== STK1000 race classification ===
Pos	No.	Rider	Bike	Laps	Time	Grid	Points
1	32	(Italy) Lorenzo Savadori	Kawasaki ZX-10R	14	27:44.044	1	25
2	94	(France) Mathieu Lussiana	Kawasaki ZX-10R	14	+2.258	11	20
3	169	(South Africa) David McFadden	Kawasaki ZX-10R	14	+4.160	5	16
4	11	(United Kingdom) Kyle Smith	Honda CBR1000RR	14	+5.087	3	13
5	4	(United States) Joshua Day	Honda CBR1000RR	14	+16.273	7	11
6	43	(Italy) Fabio Massei	Ducati 1199 Panigale R	14	+22.187	12	10
7	41	(Italy) Federico D'Annunzio	BMW S1000RR HP4	14	+27.214	9	9
8	98	(France) Romain Lanusse	Kawasaki ZX-10R	14	+27.858	6	8
9	36	(Argentina) Leandro Mercado	Ducati 1199 Panigale R	14	+35.118	2	7
10	34	(Hungary) Balázs Németh	Kawasaki ZX-10R	14	+39.348	13	6
11	18	(Netherlands) Kevin Valk	Kawasaki ZX-10R	14	+46.213	8	5
12	5	(Romania) Robert Mureșan	BMW S1000RR	14	+49.169	14	4
13	23	(Italy) Federico Sandi	BMW S1000RR HP4	14	+1:00.000	10	3
14	90	(Spain) Javier Alviz	Kawasaki ZX-10R	14	+1:10.034	19	2
15	93	(Italy) Alberto Butti	Kawasaki ZX-10R	14	+1:10.180	16	1
16	3	(Switzerland) Sébastien Suchet	Kawasaki ZX-10R	14	+1:23.269	15	
17	16	(Italy) Remo Castellarin	BMW S1000RR HP4	14	+1:23.712	17	
18	59	(Denmark) Alex Schacht	Ducati 1199 Panigale R	14	+1:39.202	18	
19	7	(Switzerland) Jérémy Ayer	Kawasaki ZX-10R	14	+1:55.935	23	
20	55	(Slovakia) Tomáš Svitok	Ducati 1199 Panigale R	13	+1 lap	20	
Ret	39	(France) Randy Pagaud	Kawasaki ZX-10R	4	Retirement	21	
Ret	12	(Switzerland) Jonathan Crea	Kawasaki ZX-10R	4	Retirement	22	
Ret	69	(Czech Republic) Ondřej Ježek	Ducati 1199 Panigale R	0	Technical problem	4	
DNS	28	(Germany) Marc Moser	Ducati 1199 Panigale R		Did not start		
WD	84	(Italy) Riccardo Russo	Kawasaki ZX-10R		Withdrew		
OFFICIAL SUPERSTOCK 1000 RACE REPORT
