= 2014 Sepang Superbike World Championship round =

(Malaysia) 2014 Sepang Superbike World Championship round
Round details
- Round 6 of 12 rounds in the 2014 Superbike World Championship. and Round 6 of 11 rounds in the 2014 Supersport World Championship.
- Date: 8 June, 2014
- Location: Sepang
- Course: Permanent racing facility 5.543 km (3.444 mi)

Superbike World Championship
Pole position
(France) Sylvain Guintoli
2:03.002
Fastest lap race 1	Fastest lap race 2
(Italy) Marco Melandri	(Italy) Marco Melandri
2:04.884	2:04.991

Supersport World Championship
Pole position
(France) Jules Cluzel
2:08.331
Fastest lap
(United Kingdom) Kev Coghlan
2:09.178

The 2014 Sepang Superbike World Championship round was the sixth round of the 2014 Superbike World Championship. It took place over the weekend of 6–8 June 2014 at the Sepang International Circuit located in Sepang, Malaysia.

== Superbike ==
=== Race 1 classification ===
Pos	No.	Rider	Bike	Laps	Time	Grid	Points
1	33	(Italy) Marco Melandri	Aprilia RSV4 Factory	16	33.42.359	5	25
2	50	(France) Sylvain Guintoli	Aprilia RSV4 Factory	16	+0.620	1	20
3	58	(Republic of Ireland) Eugene Laverty	Suzuki GSX-R1000	16	+12.865	7	16
4	7	(United Kingdom) Chaz Davies	Ducati 1199 Panigale R	16	+15.437	8	13
5	24	(Spain) Toni Elias	Aprilia RSV4 Factory	16	+15.723	4	11
6	65	(United Kingdom) Jonathan Rea	Honda CBR1000RR	16	+31.304	10	10
7	91	(United Kingdom) Leon Haslam	Honda CBR1000RR	16	+34.093	11	9
8	34	(Italy) Davide Giugliano	Ducati 1199 Panigale R	16	+35.804	3	8
9	44	(Spain) David Salom	Kawasaki ZX-10R EVO	16	+42.031	12	7
10	19	(United Kingdom) Leon Camier	BMW S1000RR EVO	16	+49.465	16	6
11	1	(France) Jérémy Guarnoni	Kawasaki ZX-10R EVO	16	+53.715	20	5
N/A^{1}	86	(Italy) Ayrton Badovini	Bimota BB3 EVO	16	+55.683	18	
12	21	(Italy) Alessandro Andreozzi	Kawasaki ZX-10R EVO	16	+1:07.783	21	4
13	67	(Australia) Bryan Staring	Kawasaki ZX-10R EVO	16	+1:10.746	23	3
14	10	(Hungary) Imre Tóth	BMW S1000RR	16	+1:18.143	24	2
15	98	(France) Romain Lanusse	Kawasaki ZX-10R EVO	16	+1:21.026	22	1
16	20	(United States) Aaron Yates	EBR 1190RX	16	+1:49.054	26	
Ret	59	(Italy) Niccolò Canepa	Ducati 1199 Panigale R EVO	13	Retirement	13	
N/A^{1}	2	(United Kingdom) Christian Iddon	Bimota BB3 EVO	8	Accident	15	
Ret	32	(South Africa) Sheridan Morais	Kawasaki ZX-10R EVO	7	Retirement	17	
Ret	56	(Hungary) Péter Sebestyén	BMW S1000RR EVO	6	Retirement	25	
Ret	71	(Italy) Claudio Corti	MV Agusta F4 RR	6	Retirement	14	
Ret	9	(France) Fabien Foret	Kawasaki ZX-10R EVO	4	Retirement	19	
Ret	22	(United Kingdom) Alex Lowes	Suzuki GSX-R1000	0	Accident	9	
Ret	76	(France) Loris Baz	Kawasaki ZX-10R	0	Accident	6	
Ret	1	(United Kingdom) Tom Sykes	Kawasaki ZX-10R	0	Accident	2	
DNS	99	(United States) Geoff May	EBR 1190RX		Did not start		
OFFICIAL SUPERBIKE RACE 1 REPORT

Notes:

- ^1 — Bimota entries were not eligible to score points and were removed from the race results.

=== Race 2 classification ===
The race was stopped after 3 laps after Claudio Corti's MV Agusta F4 RR have a technical problem and went ablaze. the race was later restarted, with race distanced shortened to 10 laps.

Pos	No.	Rider	Bike	Laps	Time	Grid	Points
1	33	(Italy) Marco Melandri	Aprilia RSV4 Factory	10	21.00.424	5	25
2	50	(France) Sylvain Guintoli	Aprilia RSV4 Factory	10	+0.166	1	20
3	1	(United Kingdom) Tom Sykes	Kawasaki ZX-10R	10	+2.689	2	16
4	24	(Spain) Toni Elias	Aprilia RSV4 Factory	10	+5.386	4	13
5	76	(France) Loris Baz	Kawasaki ZX-10R	10	+5.514	6	11
6	65	(United Kingdom) Jonathan Rea	Honda CBR1000RR	10	+7.073	10	10
7	58	(Republic of Ireland) Eugene Laverty	Suzuki GSX-R1000	10	+7.476	7	9
8	7	(United Kingdom) Chaz Davies	Ducati 1199 Panigale R	10	+11.057	8	8
9	22	(United Kingdom) Alex Lowes	Suzuki GSX-R1000	10	+15.866	9	7
10	34	(Italy) Davide Giugliano	Ducati 1199 Panigale R	10	+16.206	3	6
11	91	(United Kingdom) Leon Haslam	Honda CBR1000RR	10	+16.488	11	5
12	19	(United Kingdom) Leon Camier	BMW S1000RR EVO	10	+23.820	16	4
N/A^{1}	86	(Italy) Ayrton Badovini	Bimota BB3 EVO	10	+29.094	18	
13	44	(Spain) David Salom	Kawasaki ZX-10R EVO	10	+30.653	12	3
14	11	(France) Jérémy Guarnoni	Kawasaki ZX-10R EVO	10	+31.266	20	2
N/A^{1}	2	(United Kingdom) Christian Iddon	Bimota BB3 EVO	10	+36.354	15	
15	59	(Italy) Niccolò Canepa	Ducati 1199 Panigale R EVO	10	+43.009	13	1
16	67	(Australia) Bryan Staring	Kawasaki ZX-10R EVO	10	+46.127	23	
17	32	(South Africa) Sheridan Morais	Kawasaki ZX-10R EVO	10	+58.167	17	
18	10	(Hungary) Imre Tóth	BMW S1000RR	10	+1:00.017	24	
19	56	(Hungary) Péter Sebestyén	BMW S1000RR EVO	10	+1:03.574	25	
20	20	(United States) Aaron Yates	EBR 1190RX	10	+1:13.522	26	
Ret	98	(France) Romain Lanusse	Kawasaki ZX-10R EVO	5	Accident	22	
Ret	21	(Italy) Alessandro Andreozzi	Kawasaki ZX-10R EVO	2	Accident	21	
Ret	9	(France) Fabien Foret	Kawasaki ZX-10R EVO	0	Retirement	19	
DNS	71	(Italy) Claudio Corti	MV Agusta F4 RR	0	Retirement (Original attempt)	14	
DNS	99	(United States) Geoff May	EBR 1190RX		Did not start		
OFFICIAL SUPERBIKE RACE 2 REPORT

Notes:

- ^1 — Bimota entries were not eligible to score points and were removed from the race results.

== Supersport ==
=== Race classification ===
Pos	No.	Rider	Bike	Laps	Time	Grid	Points
1	60	(Netherlands) Michael Van Der Mark	Honda CBR600RR	14	30:23.854	3	25
2	16	(France) Jules Cluzel	MV Agusta F3 675	14	+0.018	1	20
3	54	(Turkey) Kenan Sofuoğlu	Kawasaki ZX-6R	14	+4.526	4	16
4	44	(Italy) Roberto Rolfo	Kawasaki ZX-6R	14	+4.651	5	13
5	26	(Italy) Lorenzo Zanetti	Honda CBR600RR	14	+9.187	6	11
6	14	(Thailand) Ratthapark Wilairot	Honda CBR600RR	14	+12.494	10	10
7	35	(Italy) Raffaele De Rosa	Honda CBR600RR	14	+13.515	13	9
8	99	(United States) P. J. Jacobsen	Kawasaki ZX-6R	14	+20.400	8	8
9	20	(Malaysia) Zaqhwan Zaidi	Honda CBR600RR	14	+20.579	7	7
10	24	(Italy) Marco Bussolotti	Honda CBR600RR	14	+29.038	14	6
11	11	(Italy) Christian Gamarino	Kawasaki ZX-6R	14	+33.204	16	5
12	84	(Italy) Riccardo Russo	Honda CBR600RR	14	+39.729	17	4
13	10	(Italy) Alessandro Nocco	Kawasaki ZX-6R	14	+48.739	15	3
14	65	(Russia) Vladimir Leonov	MV Agusta F3 675	14	+50.260	18	2
15	9	(Netherlands) Tony Coveña	Kawasaki ZX-6R	14	+1:02.471	22	1
16	89	(United Kingdom) Fraser Rogers	Honda CBR600RR	14	+1:17.358	20	
Ret	5	(Italy) Roberto Tamburini	Kawasaki ZX-6R	10	Accident	12	
Ret	4	(Republic of Ireland) Jack Kennedy	Honda CBR600RR	10	Accident	9	
Ret	21	(France) Florian Marino	Kawasaki ZX-6R	10	Accident	11	
Ret	61	(Italy) Fabio Menghi	Yamaha YZF-R6	9	Retirement	19	
Ret	7	(Spain) Nacho Calero	Honda CBR600RR	7	Retirement	23	
Ret	88	(United Kingdom) Kev Coghlan	Yamaha YZF-R6	4	Accident	2	
Ret	161	(Russia) Alexey Ivanov	Yamaha YZF-R6	1	Accident	21	
OFFICIAL SUPERSPORT RACE REPORT
