= 2014 Superbike World Championship =

2014 Superbike World Championship
Previous:	2013	Next:	2015
Support series: Supersport World Championship; FIM Superstock 1000 Cup; European Superstock 600 Championship; European Junior Cup

The 2014 Superbike World Championship was the twenty-seventh season of the Superbike World Championship.

The season saw the revision of the Superpole format: riders placed from eleventh to twentieth position in the combined classification of the first three practice sessions were admitted to Superpole 1, then the two fastest SP1 riders progressed to Superpole 2, which finally awarded the pole position, joining the ten fastest riders of practice.

Sylvain Guintoli became the Superbike World Champion at the last race, prevailing over Tom Sykes by six points in the standings. But both Marco Melandri and Tom Sykes won more races than Sylvain Guintoli this season. With Sykes winning 8 and Melandri 6 compared to Guintoli's 5. A portion of the riders was entered into the EVO class, featuring Superbike motorcycles with Superstock engines and electronics, scoring points for the World Championship standings and competing for the class title; David Salom was the EVO entry who amassed the most points in the overall championship standings and was awarded the title.

== Race calendar and results ==
The Fédération Internationale de Motocyclisme released a 14-round provisional calendar on 29 November 2013. The event scheduled at the Moscow Raceway for 21 September 2014 was cancelled due to the Russian military intervention in Ukraine, while Qatar was included in the 13-round updated version of the calendar, issued by the FIM on 12 April 2014, as the venue of the last event of the season.

On 31 July 2014, the Qatar round was confirmed by the Fédération Internationale de Motocyclisme, and was to be held under floodlights for its return to the calendar. On the same date, it was announced that the South African round – due to be held on 19 October at Phakisa Freeway in Welkom – was cancelled due to delays in achieving the FIM homologation requirements. It was later announced that the round would not be replaced on the calendar, reducing the season to 12 rounds.

2014 Superbike World Championship Calendar
Round		Country	Circuit	Date	Superpole	Fastest lap	Winning rider	Winning team	Report
1	R1	Australia	Phillip Island Grand Prix Circuit	23 February	(France) Sylvain Guintoli	(United Kingdom) Chaz Davies	(Republic of Ireland) Eugene Laverty	Voltcom Crescent Suzuki	Report
1	R2	Australia	Phillip Island Grand Prix Circuit	23 February	(France) Sylvain Guintoli	(France) Sylvain Guintoli	(France) Sylvain Guintoli	Aprilia Racing Team	Report
2	R1	Spain	Motorland Aragón	13 April	(United Kingdom) Tom Sykes	(United Kingdom) Tom Sykes	(United Kingdom) Tom Sykes	Kawasaki Racing Team	Report
2	R2	Spain	Motorland Aragón	13 April	(United Kingdom) Tom Sykes	(United Kingdom) Chaz Davies	(United Kingdom) Tom Sykes	Kawasaki Racing Team	Report
3	R1	Netherlands	TT Circuit Assen	27 April	(France) Loris Baz	(France) Sylvain Guintoli	(France) Sylvain Guintoli	Aprilia Racing Team	Report
3	R2	Netherlands	TT Circuit Assen	27 April	(France) Loris Baz	(United Kingdom) Alex Lowes	(United Kingdom) Jonathan Rea	Pata Honda World Superbike	Report
4	R1	Italy	Autodromo Enzo e Dino Ferrari	11 May	(United Kingdom) Jonathan Rea	(United Kingdom) Jonathan Rea	(United Kingdom) Jonathan Rea	Pata Honda World Superbike	Report
4	R2	Italy	Autodromo Enzo e Dino Ferrari	11 May	(United Kingdom) Jonathan Rea	(United Kingdom) Jonathan Rea	(United Kingdom) Jonathan Rea	Pata Honda World Superbike	Report
5	R1	United Kingdom	Donington Park	25 May	(Italy) Davide Giugliano	(United Kingdom) Tom Sykes	(United Kingdom) Tom Sykes	Kawasaki Racing Team	Report
5	R2	United Kingdom	Donington Park	25 May	(Italy) Davide Giugliano	(United Kingdom) Alex Lowes	(United Kingdom) Tom Sykes	Kawasaki Racing Team	Report
6	R1	Malaysia	Sepang International Circuit	8 June	(France) Sylvain Guintoli	(Italy) Marco Melandri	(Italy) Marco Melandri	Aprilia Racing Team	Report
6	R2	Malaysia	Sepang International Circuit	8 June	(France) Sylvain Guintoli	(Italy) Marco Melandri	(Italy) Marco Melandri	Aprilia Racing Team	Report
7	R1	Italy	Misano World Circuit Marco Simoncelli	22 June	(United Kingdom) Tom Sykes	(United Kingdom) Tom Sykes	(United Kingdom) Tom Sykes	Kawasaki Racing Team	Report
7	R2	Italy	Misano World Circuit Marco Simoncelli	22 June	(United Kingdom) Tom Sykes	(Italy) Davide Giugliano	(United Kingdom) Tom Sykes	Kawasaki Racing Team	Report
8	R1	Portugal	Autódromo Internacional do Algarve	6 July	(United Kingdom) Tom Sykes	(United Kingdom) Tom Sykes	(United Kingdom) Tom Sykes	Kawasaki Racing Team	Report
8	R2	Portugal	Autódromo Internacional do Algarve	6 July	(United Kingdom) Tom Sykes	(United Kingdom) Chaz Davies	(United Kingdom) Jonathan Rea	Pata Honda World Superbike	Report
9	R1	United States	Mazda Raceway Laguna Seca	13 July	(United Kingdom) Tom Sykes	(France) Sylvain Guintoli	(Italy) Marco Melandri	Aprilia Racing Team	Report
9	R2	United States	Mazda Raceway Laguna Seca	13 July	(United Kingdom) Tom Sykes	(Italy) Davide Giugliano	(United Kingdom) Tom Sykes	Kawasaki Racing Team	Report
10	R1	Spain	Circuito de Jerez	7 September	(France) Loris Baz	(Italy) Davide Giugliano	(Italy) Marco Melandri	Aprilia Racing Team	Report
10	R2	Spain	Circuito de Jerez	7 September	(France) Loris Baz	(France) Sylvain Guintoli	(Italy) Marco Melandri	Aprilia Racing Team	Report
11	R1	France	Circuit de Nevers Magny-Cours	5 October	(United Kingdom) Tom Sykes	(Italy) Marco Melandri	(France) Sylvain Guintoli	Aprilia Racing Team	Report
11	R2	France	Circuit de Nevers Magny-Cours	5 October	(United Kingdom) Tom Sykes	(France) Sylvain Guintoli	(Italy) Marco Melandri	Aprilia Racing Team	Report
12	R1	Qatar	Losail International Circuit	2 November	(Italy) Davide Giugliano	(France) Loris Baz	(France) Sylvain Guintoli	Aprilia Racing Team	Report
12	R2	Qatar	Losail International Circuit	2 November	(Italy) Davide Giugliano	(France) Sylvain Guintoli	(France) Sylvain Guintoli	Aprilia Racing Team	Report

== Entry list ==
2014 entry list
Team	Constructor	Motorcycle	No.	Rider	Rounds
(Japan) Kawasaki Racing Team	Kawasaki	Kawasaki ZX-10R	1	(United Kingdom) Tom Sykes	All
(Japan) Kawasaki Racing Team	Kawasaki	Kawasaki ZX-10R	76	(France) Loris Baz	All
(Italy) Ducati Superbike Team	Ducati	Ducati 1199 Panigale R	7	(United Kingdom) Chaz Davies	All
(Italy) Ducati Superbike Team	Ducati	Ducati 1199 Panigale R	34	(Italy) Davide Giugliano	All
(Hungary) BMW Team Tóth	BMW	BMW S1000RR	10	(Hungary) Imre Tóth	1–7, 10–12
(Hungary) BMW Team Tóth	BMW	BMW S1000RR	16	(Hungary) Gábor Rizmayer	8–9
(United States) GEICO Motorcycle Road Rac.	Honda	Honda CBR1000RR	18	(United States) Chris Ulrich	9
MV Agusta RC–Yakhnich M. (Italy) MV Agusta Reparto Corse	MV Agusta	MV Agusta F4 RR	19	(United Kingdom) Leon Camier	9
MV Agusta RC–Yakhnich M. (Italy) MV Agusta Reparto Corse	MV Agusta	MV Agusta F4 RR	71	(Italy) Claudio Corti	1–8, 10–12
(United States) Team Hero EBR	EBR	EBR 1190RX	20	(United States) Aaron Yates	All
(United States) Team Hero EBR	EBR	EBR 1190RX	99	(United States) Geoff May	All
(United Kingdom) Voltcom Crescent Suzuki	Suzuki	Suzuki GSX-R1000	22	(United Kingdom) Alex Lowes	All
(United Kingdom) Voltcom Crescent Suzuki	Suzuki	Suzuki GSX-R1000	58	(Republic of Ireland) Eugene Laverty	All
(Italy) Red Devils Roma	Aprilia	Aprilia RSV4 Factory	24	(Spain) Toni Elías	All
3C Racing Team	Ducati	Ducati 1199 Panigale R	27	(Germany) Max Neukirchner	11
3C Racing Team	Ducati	Ducati 1199 Panigale R	57	(Italy) Lorenzo Lanzi	11
3C Racing Team	Ducati	Ducati 1199 Panigale R	212	(Spain) Javier Forés	11
Dream Team Company	MV Agusta	MV Agusta F4 RR	30	(Switzerland) Michaël Savary	7
Dream Team Company	MV Agusta	MV Agusta F4 RR	74	(France) Nicolas Salchaud	11
(Italy) Aprilia Racing Team	Aprilia	Aprilia RSV4 Factory	33	(Italy) Marco Melandri	All
(Italy) Aprilia Racing Team	Aprilia	Aprilia RSV4 Factory	50	(France) Sylvain Guintoli	All
(Netherlands) Pata Honda World Superbike	Honda	Honda CBR1000RR	65	(United Kingdom) Jonathan Rea	All
(Netherlands) Pata Honda World Superbike	Honda	Honda CBR1000RR	91	(United Kingdom) Leon Haslam	All
(United States) Foremost Insurance EBR	EBR	EBR 1190RX	72	(United States) Larry Pegram	9
EVO class entries
(Italy) Team Bimota Alstare	Bimota	Bimota BB3	2	(United Kingdom) Christian Iddon	2–9
(Italy) Team Bimota Alstare	Bimota	Bimota BB3	86	(Italy) Ayrton Badovini	2–9
Mahi Racing Team India	Kawasaki	Kawasaki ZX-10R	9	(France) Fabien Foret	1–8
(Italy) Team Pedercini	Kawasaki	Kawasaki ZX-10R	9	(France) Fabien Foret	11
(Italy) Team Pedercini	Kawasaki	Kawasaki ZX-10R	12	(Australia) Matthew Walters	1
(Italy) Team Pedercini	Kawasaki	Kawasaki ZX-10R	21	(Italy) Alessandro Andreozzi	All
(Italy) Team Pedercini	Kawasaki	Kawasaki ZX-10R	23	(Italy) Luca Scassa	2–4, 10
(Italy) Team Pedercini	Kawasaki	Kawasaki ZX-10R	48	(Italy) Riccardo Russo	7–8
(Italy) Team Pedercini	Kawasaki	Kawasaki ZX-10R	95	(Australia) Alex Cudlin	12
(Italy) Team Pedercini	Kawasaki	Kawasaki ZX-10R	98	(France) Romain Lanusse	5–6
MRS Kawasaki	Kawasaki	Kawasaki ZX-10R	11	(France) Jérémy Guarnoni	All
(Italy) BMW Motorrad Italia SBK	BMW	BMW S1000RR	14	(Australia) Glenn Allerton	1
(Italy) BMW Motorrad Italia SBK	BMW	BMW S1000RR	19	(United Kingdom) Leon Camier	2–6
(Italy) BMW Motorrad Italia SBK	BMW	BMW S1000RR	52	(France) Sylvain Barrier	7–12
(Italy) Grandi Corse by A.P. Racing	Ducati	Ducati 1199 Panigale R	15	(Italy) Matteo Baiocco	7
(Hungary) BMW Team Tóth	BMW	BMW S1000RR	16	(Hungary) Gábor Rizmayer	10–12
(Hungary) BMW Team Tóth	BMW	BMW S1000RR	56	(Hungary) Péter Sebestyén	1–9
Iron Brain Kawasaki SBK (Italy) Iron Brain Grillini Kawasaki	Kawasaki	Kawasaki ZX-10R	32	(South Africa) Sheridan Morais	All
Iron Brain Kawasaki SBK (Italy) Iron Brain Grillini Kawasaki	Kawasaki	Kawasaki ZX-10R	67	(Australia) Bryan Staring	5–12
Iron Brain Kawasaki SBK (Italy) Iron Brain Grillini Kawasaki	Kawasaki	Kawasaki ZX-10R	84	(Italy) Michel Fabrizio	2–4
(Japan) Kawasaki Racing Team	Kawasaki	Kawasaki ZX-10R	44	(Spain) David Salom	All
(Italy) Althea Racing	Ducati	Ducati 1199 Panigale R	59	(Italy) Niccolò Canepa	All
Winteb LiquidRubber Racing T.	Honda	Honda CBR1000RR	77	(Netherlands) Kervin Bos	3
(Italy) Barni Racing Team	Ducati	Ducati 1199 Panigale R	112	(Italy) Ivan Goi	4, 7

Key
Regular rider
Wildcard rider
Replacement rider

- All entries used Pirelli tyres.

== Championship standings ==
=== Riders' championship ===
Pos	Rider	Bike	PHI (Australia)		ARA (Spain)		ASS (Netherlands)		IMO (Italy)		DON (United Kingdom)		SEP (Malaysia)		MIS (Italy)		POR (Portugal)		LAG (United States)		JER (Spain)		MAG (France)		LOS (Qatar)		Pts
Pos	Rider	Bike	R1	R2	R1	R2	R1	R2	R1	R2	R1	R2	R1	R2	R1	R2	R1	R2	R1	R2	R1	R2	R1	R2	R1	R2	Pts
1	(France) Sylvain Guintoli	Aprilia	**3**	**1**	6	4	1	9	5	3	7	3	**2**	**2**	5	4	2	7	2	2	2	2	1	2	1	1	416
2	(United Kingdom) Tom Sykes	Kawasaki	7	3	**1**	**1**	2	4	3	5	1	1	Ret	3	**1**	**1**	**1**	**8**	**3**	**1**	5	3	**4**	**4**	3	3	410
3	(United Kingdom) Jonathan Rea	Honda	6	5	3	5	3	1	**1**	**1**	6	6	6	6	7	5	5	1	6	3	4	5	3	Ret	4	2	334
4	(Italy) Marco Melandri	Aprilia	2	8	11	3	6	6	6	11	4	17	1	1	3	3	4	Ret	1	Ret	1	1	2	1	8	4	333
5	(France) Loris Baz	Kawasaki	5	2	2	2	**4**	**7**	4	4	2	2	Ret	5	2	2	3	6	9	6	**Ret**	**7**	5	7	2	7	311
6	(United Kingdom) Chaz Davies	Ducati	8	7	4	Ret	7	8	2	2	5	5	4	8	4	Ret	18	3	Ret	DNS	3	4	Ret	9	7	5	215
7	(United Kingdom) Leon Haslam	Honda	Ret	6	9	8	8	5	10	8	8	7	7	11	10	12	11	5	7	7	7	8	6	3	11	10	187
8	(Italy) Davide Giugliano	Ducati	4	4	8	7	Ret	3	Ret	6	**Ret**	**4**	8	10	8	9	7	2	4	Ret	Ret	Ret	7	Ret	**5**	**8**	181
9	(Spain) Toni Elías	Aprilia	Ret	9	7	9	5	Ret	9	7	9	8	5	4	6	6	Ret	10	5	5	8	10	Ret	Ret	6	6	171
10	(Republic of Ireland) Eugene Laverty	Suzuki	1	Ret	5	6	Ret	Ret	7	9	Ret	13	3	7	9	7	8	9	Ret	4	6	6	19	Ret	9	Ret	161
11	(United Kingdom) Alex Lowes	Suzuki	Ret	13	10	Ret	9	2	8	10	3	9	Ret	9	Ret	8	6	4	8	DNS	Ret	9	Ret	Ret	10	9	139
12	(Spain) David Salom	Kawasaki	9	10	13	10	12	15	12	13	10	10	9	13	11	10	9	17	10	8	9	Ret	DNS	DNS	13	11	103
13	(Italy) Niccolò Canepa	Ducati	10	11	Ret	11	10	10	Ret	Ret	11	11	Ret	15	12	16	13	18	11	Ret	14	15	11	10	12	12	73
14	(France) Jérémy Guarnoni	Kawasaki	14	16	14	Ret	15	Ret	14	16	13	14	11	14	16	Ret	12	13	14	11	11	13	12	Ret	16	Ret	45
15	(France) Sylvain Barrier	BMW													15	11	10	11	12	Ret	10	11	10	Ret	14	Ret	40
16	(United Kingdom) Leon Camier	BMW			12	12	13	Ret	11	12	DNS	DNS	10	12													37
16	(United Kingdom) Leon Camier	MV Agusta																	15	10							37
17	(Italy) Claudio Corti	MV Agusta	13	18	Ret	Ret	14	Ret	18	Ret	15	12	Ret	DNS	13	17	DNS	DNS			15	Ret	13	8	Ret	14	27
18	(South Africa) Sheridan Morais	Kawasaki	15	14	15	13	16	13	17	Ret	19	16	Ret	17	Ret	Ret	Ret	12	20	13	13	12	17	Ret	DNS	DNS	24
19	(Italy) Alessandro Andreozzi	Kawasaki	Ret	17	19	16	17	Ret	15	17	14	15	12	Ret	Ret	15	15	16	16	9	12	Ret	Ret	Ret	Ret	15	22
20	(France) Fabien Foret	Kawasaki	12	12	Ret	15	Ret	Ret	16	15	12	18	Ret	Ret	Ret	Ret	Ret	DNS					15	11			20
21	(Italy) Lorenzo Lanzi	Ducati																					8	5			19
22	(Australia) Bryan Staring	Kawasaki									DNS	DNS	13	16	18	18	NC	14	13	12	Ret	Ret	14	Ret	15	13	18
23	(Germany) Max Neukirchner	Ducati																					9	6			17
24	(Italy) Luca Scassa	Kawasaki			16	14	11	12	13	14							WD	WD			DNS	DNS					16
25	(Hungary) Gábor Rizmayer	BMW															17	19	17	15	16	14	Ret	12	Ret	DNS	7
26	(Australia) Glenn Allerton	BMW	11	15																							6
27	(Netherlands) Kervin Bos	Honda					18	11																			5
28	(Hungary) Imre Tóth	BMW	16	19	18	17	20	16	20	19	18	20	14	18	DNS	DNS					18	Ret	20	13	18	17	5
29	(Italy) Ivan Goi	Ducati							Ret	Ret					14	13											5
30	(Italy) Riccardo Russo	Kawasaki													17	14	14	15									5
31	(United States) Larry Pegram	EBR																	Ret	14							2
32	(Italy) Michel Fabrizio	Kawasaki	WD	WD	Ret	Ret	Ret	14	Ret	Ret																	2
33	(France) Romain Lanusse	Kawasaki									16	19	15	Ret													1
	(United States) Aaron Yates	EBR	17	20	17	19	Ret	DNS	Ret	Ret	17	Ret	16	20	Ret	DNS	16	Ret	Ret	DNS	Ret	16	Ret	Ret	Ret	Ret	0
	(United States) Geoff May	EBR	DNS	DNS	Ret	20	19	DNS	Ret	18	DNS	DNS	DNS	DNS	Ret	Ret	Ret	Ret	18	16	17	Ret	18	Ret	17	16	0
	(France) Nicolas Salchaud	MV Agusta																					16	Ret			0
	(United States) Chris Ulrich	Honda																	19	17							0
	(Australia) Alex Cudlin	Kawasaki																							Ret	18	0
	(Hungary) Péter Sebestyén	BMW	DNQ	DNQ	20	18	Ret	DNS	19	Ret	DNS	DNS	Ret	19	19	19	Ret	Ret	Ret	DNS							0
	(Spain) Javier Forés	Ducati																					Ret	Ret			0
	(Italy) Matteo Baiocco	Ducati													Ret	Ret											0
	(Italy) Ayrton Badovini	Bimota			DSQ	DSQ	DSQ	DSQ	DSQ	DSQ	DSQ	DSQ	DSQ	DSQ	DSQ	DSQ	DSQ	DSQ	DSQ	DSQ							0
	(United Kingdom) Christian Iddon	Bimota			DSQ	DSQ	DSQ	DSQ	DSQ	DSQ	DSQ	DSQ	DSQ	DSQ	DSQ	DSQ	DSQ	DSQ	DSQ	DSQ							0
	(Switzerland) Michaël Savary	MV Agusta													DNS	DNS											0
	(Australia) Matthew Walters	Kawasaki	DNS	DNS																							0
Pos	Rider	Bike	PHI (Australia)		ARA (Spain)		ASS (Netherlands)		IMO (Italy)		DON (United Kingdom)		SEP (Malaysia)		MIS (Italy)		POR (Portugal)		LAG (United States)		JER (Spain)		MAG (France)		LOS (Qatar)		Pts

Colour	Result
Gold	Winner
Silver	Second place
Bronze	Third place
Green	Points classification
Blue	Non-points classification
Blue	Non-classified finish (NC)
Purple	Retired, not classified (Ret)
Red	Did not qualify (DNQ)
Red	Did not pre-qualify (DNPQ)
Black	Disqualified (DSQ)
White	Did not start (DNS)
White	Withdrew (WD)
White	Race cancelled (C)
Blank	Did not practice (DNP)
Blank	Did not arrive (DNA)
Blank	Excluded (EX)

**Bold** – Pole
Italics – Fastest Lap
Light blue – EVO

=== Teams' championship ===
Pos.	Team	Bike No.	PHI (Australia)		ARA (Spain)		ASS (Netherlands)		IMO (Italy)		DON (United Kingdom)		SEP (Malaysia)		MIS (Italy)		POR (Portugal)		LAG (United States)		JER (Spain)		MAG (France)		LOS (Qatar)		Pts.
Pos.	Team	Bike No.	R1	R2	R1	R2	R1	R2	R1	R2	R1	R2	R1	R2	R1	R2	R1	R2	R1	R2	R1	R2	R1	R2	R1	R2	Pts.
1	(Italy) Aprilia Racing Team	50	**3**	**1**	6	4	1	9	5	3	7	3	**2**	**2**	5	4	2	7	2	2	2	2	1	2	1	1	749
1	(Italy) Aprilia Racing Team	33	2	8	11	3	6	6	6	11	4	17	1	1	3	3	4	Ret	1	Ret	1	1	2	1	8	4	749
2	(Japan) Kawasaki Racing Team	1	7	3	**1**	**1**	2	4	3	5	1	1	Ret	3	**1**	**1**	**1**	**8**	**3**	**1**	5	3	**4**	**4**	3	3	735
2	(Japan) Kawasaki Racing Team	76	5	2	2	2	**4**	**7**	4	4	2	2	Ret	5	2	2	3	6	9	6	**Ret**	**7**	5	7	2	7	735
2	(Japan) Kawasaki Racing Team	44	9	10	13	10	12	15	12	13	10	10	9	13	11	10	9	17	10	8	9	Ret	DNS	DNS	13	11	735
3	(Netherlands) Pata Honda World Superbike	65	6	5	3	5	3	1	**1**	**1**	6	6	6	6	7	5	5	1	6	3	4	5	3	Ret	4	2	521
3	(Netherlands) Pata Honda World Superbike	91	Ret	6	9	8	8	5	10	8	8	7	7	11	10	12	11	5	7	7	7	8	6	3	11	10	521
4	(Italy) Ducati Superbike Team	7	8	7	4	Ret	7	8	2	2	5	5	4	8	4	Ret	18	3	Ret	DNS	3	4	Ret	9	7	5	396
4	(Italy) Ducati Superbike Team	34	4	4	8	7	Ret	3	Ret	6	**Ret**	**4**	8	10	8	9	7	2	4	Ret	Ret	Ret	7	Ret	**5**	**8**	396
5	(United Kingdom) Voltcom Crescent Suzuki	58	1	Ret	5	6	Ret	Ret	7	9	Ret	13	3	7	9	7	8	9	Ret	4	6	6	19	Ret	9	Ret	300
5	(United Kingdom) Voltcom Crescent Suzuki	22	Ret	13	10	Ret	9	2	8	10	3	9	Ret	9	Ret	8	6	4	8	DNS	Ret	9	Ret	Ret	10	9	300
6	(Italy) Red Devils Roma	24	Ret	9	7	9	5	Ret	9	7	9	8	5	4	6	6	Ret	10	5	5	8	10	Ret	Ret	6	6	171
7	(Italy) BMW Motorrad Italia SBK	52													15	11	10	11	12	Ret	10	11	10	Ret	14	Ret	76
7	(Italy) BMW Motorrad Italia SBK	19			12	12	13	Ret	11	12	DNS	DNS	10	12													76
7	(Italy) BMW Motorrad Italia SBK	14	11	15																							76
8	(Italy) Althea Racing	59	10	11	Ret	11	10	10	Ret	Ret	11	11	Ret	15	12	16	13	18	11	Ret	14	15	11	10	12	12	73
9	(Italy) Team Pedercini	21	Ret	17	19	16	17	Ret	15	17	14	15	12	Ret	Ret	15	15	16	16	9	12	Ret	Ret	Ret	Ret	15	50
9	(Italy) Team Pedercini	23			16	14	11	12	13	14							WD	WD			DNS	DNS					50
9	(Italy) Team Pedercini	9																					15	11			50
9	(Italy) Team Pedercini	48													17	14	14	15									50
9	(Italy) Team Pedercini	98									16	19	15	Ret													50
9	(Italy) Team Pedercini	95																							Ret	18	50
9	(Italy) Team Pedercini	12	DNS	DNS																							50
10	(France) MRS Kawasaki	11	14	16	14	Ret	15	Ret	14	16	13	14	11	14	16	Ret	12	13	14	11	11	13	12	Ret	16	Ret	45
11	(Italy) Iron Brain Grillini Kawasaki	32	15	14	15	13	16	13	17	Ret	19	16	Ret	17	Ret	Ret	Ret	12	20	13	13	12	17	Ret	DNS	DNS	44
11	(Italy) Iron Brain Grillini Kawasaki	67									DNS	DNS	13	16	18	18	NC	14	13	12	Ret	Ret	14	Ret	15	13	44
11	(Italy) Iron Brain Grillini Kawasaki	84	WD	WD	Ret	Ret	Ret	14	Ret	Ret																	44
12	(Germany) 3C Racing Team	57																					8	5			36
12	(Germany) 3C Racing Team	27																					9	6			36
12	(Germany) 3C Racing Team	212																					Ret	Ret			36
13	(Italy) MV Agusta Reparto Corse	71	13	18	Ret	Ret	14	Ret	18	Ret	15	12	Ret	DNS	13	17	DNS	DNS			15	Ret	13	8	Ret	14	34
13	(Italy) MV Agusta Reparto Corse	19																	15	10							34
14	Mahi Racing Team India	9	12	12	Ret	15	Ret	Ret	16	15	12	18	Ret	Ret	Ret	Ret	Ret	DNS									14
15	(Hungary) BMW Team Tóth	16															17	19	17	15	16	14	Ret	12	Ret	DNS	12
15	(Hungary) BMW Team Tóth	10	16	19	18	17	20	16	20	19	18	20	14	18	DNS	DNS					18	Ret	20	13	18	17	12
15	(Hungary) BMW Team Tóth	56	DNQ	DNQ	20	18	Ret	DNS	19	Ret	DNS	DNS	Ret	19	19	19	Ret	Ret	Ret	DNS							12
16	(Netherlands) Winteb LiquidRubber Racing T.	77					18	11																			5
17	(Italy) Barni Racing Team	112							Ret	Ret					14	13											5
18	(United States) Foremost Insurance EBR	72																	Ret	14							2
	(United States) Team Hero EBR	20	17	20	17	19	Ret	DNS	Ret	Ret	17	Ret	16	20	Ret	DNS	16	Ret	Ret	DNS	Ret	16	Ret	Ret	Ret	Ret	0
	(United States) Team Hero EBR	99	DNS	DNS	Ret	20	19	DNS	Ret	18	DNS	DNS	DNS	DNS	Ret	Ret	Ret	Ret	18	16	17	Ret	18	Ret	17	16	0
	(Luxembourg) Dream Team Company	74																					16	Ret			0
	(Luxembourg) Dream Team Company	30													DNS	DNS											0
	(United States) GEICO Motorcycle Road Rac.	18																	19	17							0
	(Italy) Grandi Corse by A.P. Racing	15													Ret	Ret											0
	(Belgium) Team Bimota Alstare	2			DSQ	DSQ	DSQ	DSQ	DSQ	DSQ	DSQ	DSQ	DSQ	DSQ	DSQ	DSQ	DSQ	DSQ	DSQ	DSQ							0
	(Belgium) Team Bimota Alstare	86			DSQ	DSQ	DSQ	DSQ	DSQ	DSQ	DSQ	DSQ	DSQ	DSQ	DSQ	DSQ	DSQ	DSQ	DSQ	DSQ							0
Pos.	Team	Bike No.	PHI (Australia)		ARA (Spain)		ASS (Netherlands)		IMO (Italy)		DON (United Kingdom)		SEP (Malaysia)		MIS (Italy)		POR (Portugal)		LAG (United States)		JER (Spain)		MAG (France)		LOS (Qatar)		Pts.

=== Manufacturers' championship ===
Pos	Manufacturer	PHI (Australia)		ARA (Spain)		ASS (Netherlands)		IMO (Italy)		DON (United Kingdom)		SEP (Malaysia)		MIS (Italy)		POR (Portugal)		LAG (United States)		JER (Spain)		MAG (France)		LOS (Qatar)		Pts
Pos	Manufacturer	R1	R2	R1	R2	R1	R2	R1	R2	R1	R2	R1	R2	R1	R2	R1	R2	R1	R2	R1	R2	R1	R2	R1	R2	Pts
1	(Italy) Aprilia	2	1	6	3	1	6	5	3	4	3	1	1	3	3	2	7	1	2	1	1	1	1	1	1	468
2	(Japan) Kawasaki	5	2	1	1	2	4	3	4	1	1	9	3	1	1	1	6	3	1	5	3	4	4	2	3	431
3	(Japan) Honda	6	5	3	5	3	1	1	1	6	6	6	6	7	5	5	1	6	3	4	5	3	3	4	2	350
4	(Italy) Ducati	4	4	4	7	7	3	2	2	5	4	4	8	4	9	7	2	4	Ret	3	4	7	5	5	5	291
5	(Japan) Suzuki	1	13	5	6	9	2	7	9	3	9	3	7	9	7	6	4	8	4	6	6	19	Ret	9	9	234
6	(Germany) BMW	11	15	12	12	13	16	11	12	18	20	10	12	15	11	10	11	12	15	10	11	10	12	14	17	81
7	(Italy) MV Agusta	13	18	Ret	Ret	14	Ret	18	Ret	15	12	Ret	DNS	13	17	DNS	DNS	15	10	15	Ret	13	8	Ret	14	34
8	(United States) EBR	17	20	17	19	19	DNS	Ret	18	17	Ret	16	20	Ret	Ret	16	Ret	18	14	17	16	18	Ret	17	16	2
	(Italy) Bimota			DSQ	DSQ	DSQ	DSQ	DSQ	DSQ	DSQ	DSQ	DSQ	DSQ	DSQ	DSQ	DSQ	DSQ	DSQ	DSQ							0
Pos	Manufacturer	PHI (Australia)		ARA (Spain)		ASS (Netherlands)		IMO (Italy)		DON (United Kingdom)		SEP (Malaysia)		MIS (Italy)		POR (Portugal)		LAG (United States)		JER (Spain)		MAG (France)		LOS (Qatar)		Pts
