= Alex Cudlin =

Australian motorcycle racer

Alexander Cudlin
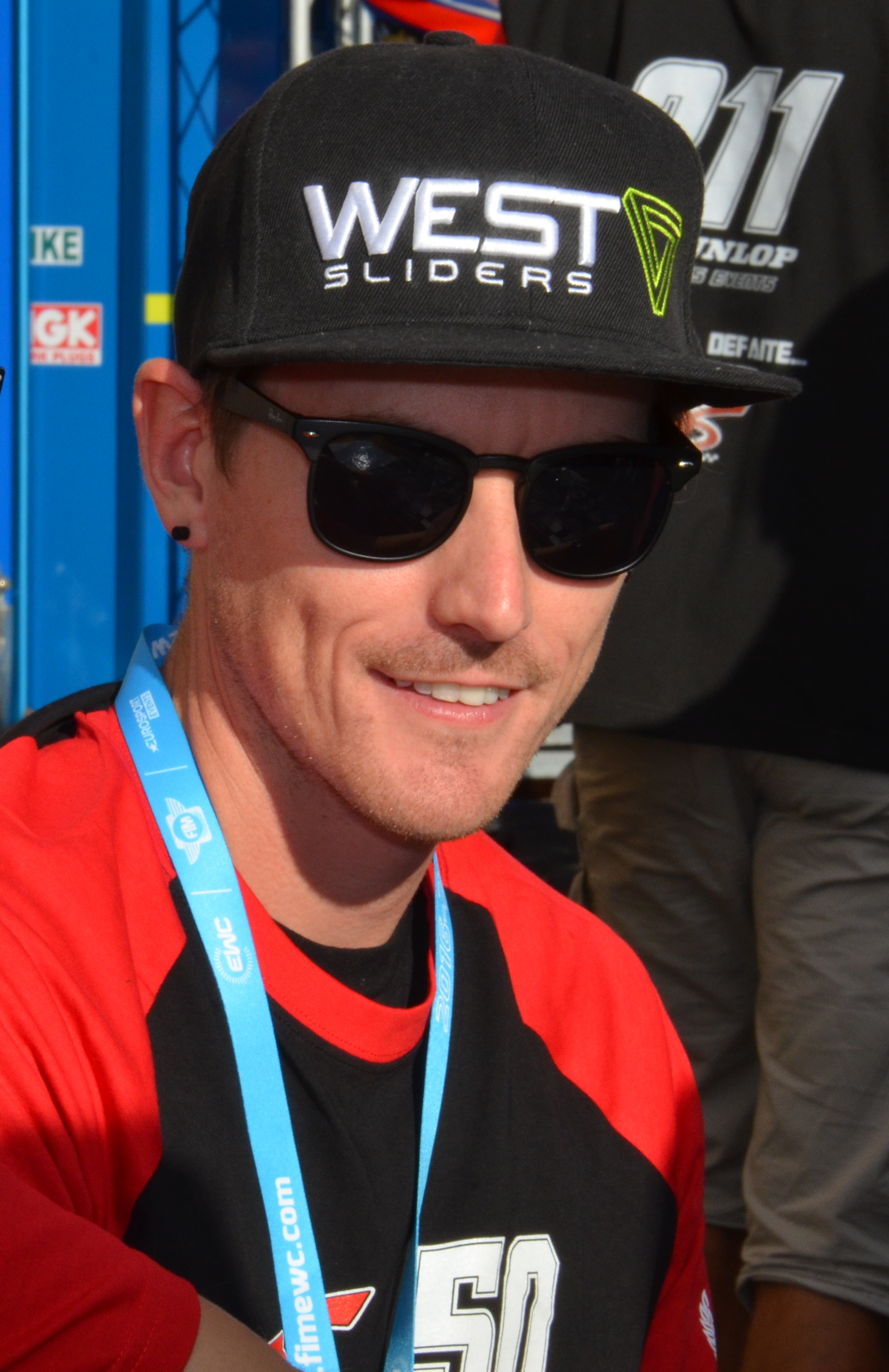
- Alex Cudlin au Bol d'Or 2016
- Nationality: Australian
- Born: Alexander Kenneth Josef Cudlin; 8 August 1986 (age 40); St Clair, New South Wales, Australia
- Current team: Suzuki Endurance Racing Team
- Bike number: 1
- Website: alexcudlin.com
Motorcycle racing career statistics
Moto2 World Championship
Active years	2010–2011
Manufacturers	BQR-Moto2, Moriwaki
Championships	0
2011 championship position	NC (0 pts)
Starts / Wins / Podiums / Poles / F. laps / Points; 2 / 0 / 0 / 0 / 0 / 0
Superbike World Championship
Active years	2014
Manufacturers	Kawasaki
Championships	0
2014 championship position	NC (0 pts)
Starts / Wins / Podiums / Poles / F. laps / Points; 2 / 0 / 0 / 0 / 0 / 0

Alexander Kenneth Josef Cudlin (born 8 August 1986) is a motorcycle racer from Australia. His elder brother, Damian Cudlin, is also a motorcycle racer. He competes in the Endurance FIM World Championship aboard a Suzuki GSX-R1000.

== Career statistics ==
2003- 2nd, Australian Superstock 600 Championship #52 Yamaha YZF-R6 / 1st, Australian FX Superstock 600 Championship #52 Yamaha YZF-R6
2004- Australian Supersport Championship #52 Yamaha YZF-R6
2005- Australian Supersport Championship #52 Yamaha YZF-R6
2006- 7th, Endurance FIM World Championship #666 Kawasaki ZX-10R
2007- 13th, Endurance FIM World Championship #666 Kawasaki ZX-10R
2008- 22nd, Endurance FIM World Championship #666 Kawasaki ZX-10R
2009- 8th, Endurance FIM World Championship #3 Yamaha YZF-R1
2010- 1st, Endurance World Cup #95 Suzuki GSX-R1000 / 1st, QIRRCH #80 Suzuki GSX-R1000
2011- 11th, Endurance World Cup #95 Suzuki GSX-R1000 / 1st, QIRRCH #1 Suzuki GSX-R1000
2012- 7th, Endurance World Cup #95 Suzuki GSX-R1000 / 1st, QIRRCH #01 Suzuki GSX-R1000
2013- 1st, QIRRCH #01 Suzuki GSX-R1000 / 1st, Le Mans 24 Hours Suzuki GSX-R1000
2014- 1st, Qatar Superbike Championship #1 Kawasaki ZX-10R / 2nd, Endurance World Cup #95 Kawasaki ZX-10R
2015- 1st, Qatar Superbike Championship #1 Kawasaki ZX-10R / 11th, Endurance World Cup #95 Kawasaki ZX-10R
2016- 1st, Qatar Superbike Championship #1 Kawasaki ZX-10R / 3rd, Endurance FIM World Championship #50 Suzuki GSX-R1000
2017- Endurance FIM World Championship #1 Suzuki GSX-R1000

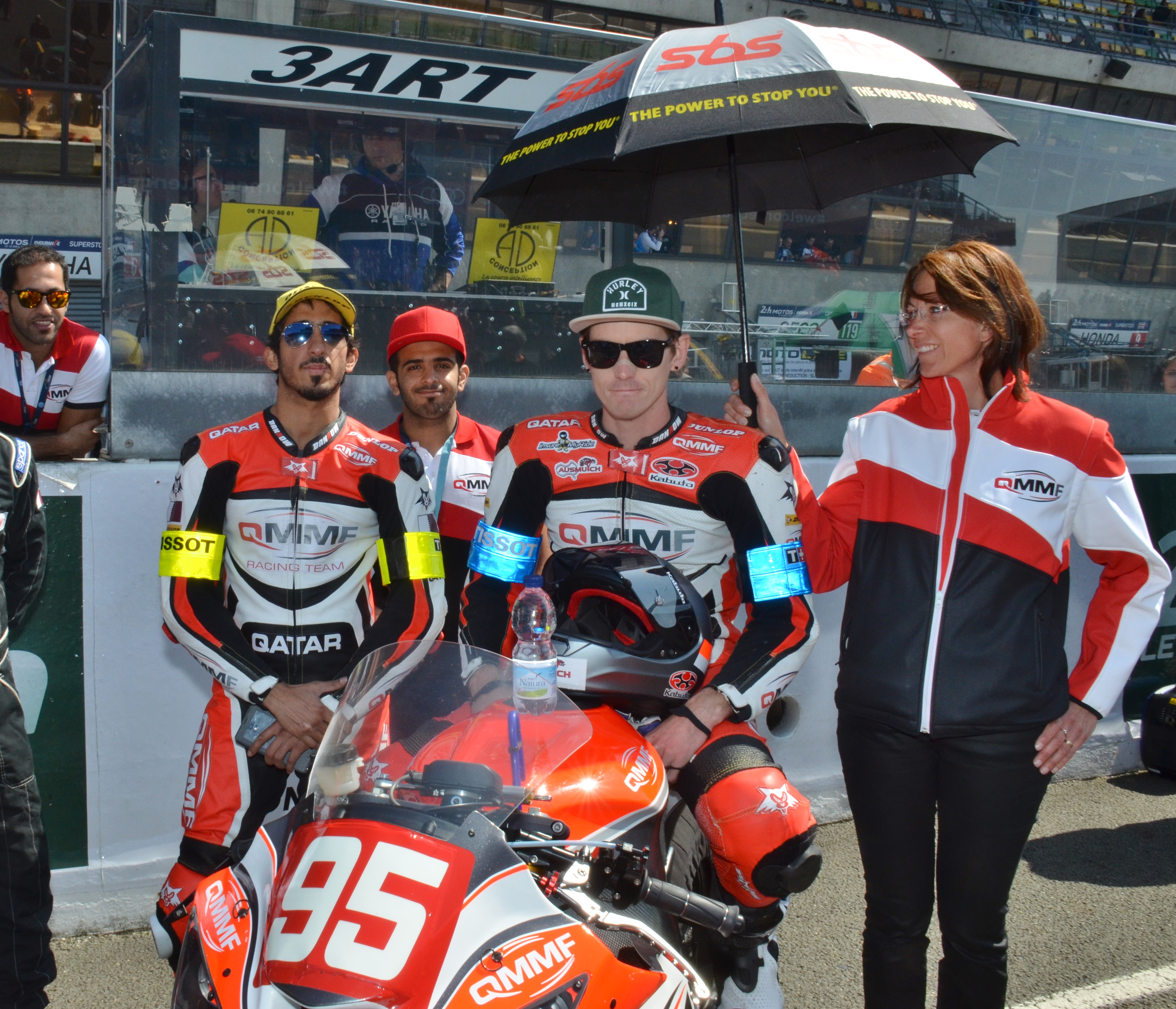
Alex Cudlin aux 24 Heures Moto 2015

=== Grand Prix motorcycle racing ===
==== By season ====
Season	Class	Motorcycle	Team	Number	Race	Win	Podium	Pole	FLap	Pts	Plcd
2010	Moto2	BQR-Moto2	Qatar Moto2 Team	49	1	0	0	0	0	0	NC
2011	Moto2	Moriwaki	QMMF Racing Team	8	1	0	0	0	0	0	NC
Total					2	0	0	0	0	0	

==== Races by year ====
(key)

Year	Class	Bike	1	2	3	4	5	6	7	8	9	10	11	12	13	14	15	16	17	Pos	Pts
2010	Moto2	Moriwaki	QAT	SPA	FRA	ITA	GBR	NED	CAT	GER	CZE	INP	RSM	ARA	JPN	MAL	AUS; 30	POR	VAL	NC	0
2011	Moto2	BQR-Moto2	QAT	SPA	POR	FRA; 32	CAT	GBR	NED	ITA	GER	CZE	INP	RSM	ARA	JPN	AUS	MAL	VAL	NC	0

=== Superbike World Championship ===
==== Races by year ====
(key)

Year	Bike	1		2		3		4		5		6		7		8		9		10		11		12		Pos	Pts
Year	Bike	R1	R2	R1	R2	R1	R2	R1	R2	R1	R2	R1	R2	R1	R2	R1	R2	R1	R2	R1	R2	R1	R2	R1	R2	Pos	Pts
2014	Kawasaki	AUS	AUS	SPA	SPA	NED	NED	ITA	ITA	GBR	GBR	MAL	MAL	SMR	SMR	POR	POR	USA	USA	SPA	SPA	FRA	FRA	QAT; Ret	QAT; 18	NC	0
