= Alessandro Andreozzi =

Italian motorcycle racer (born 1991)

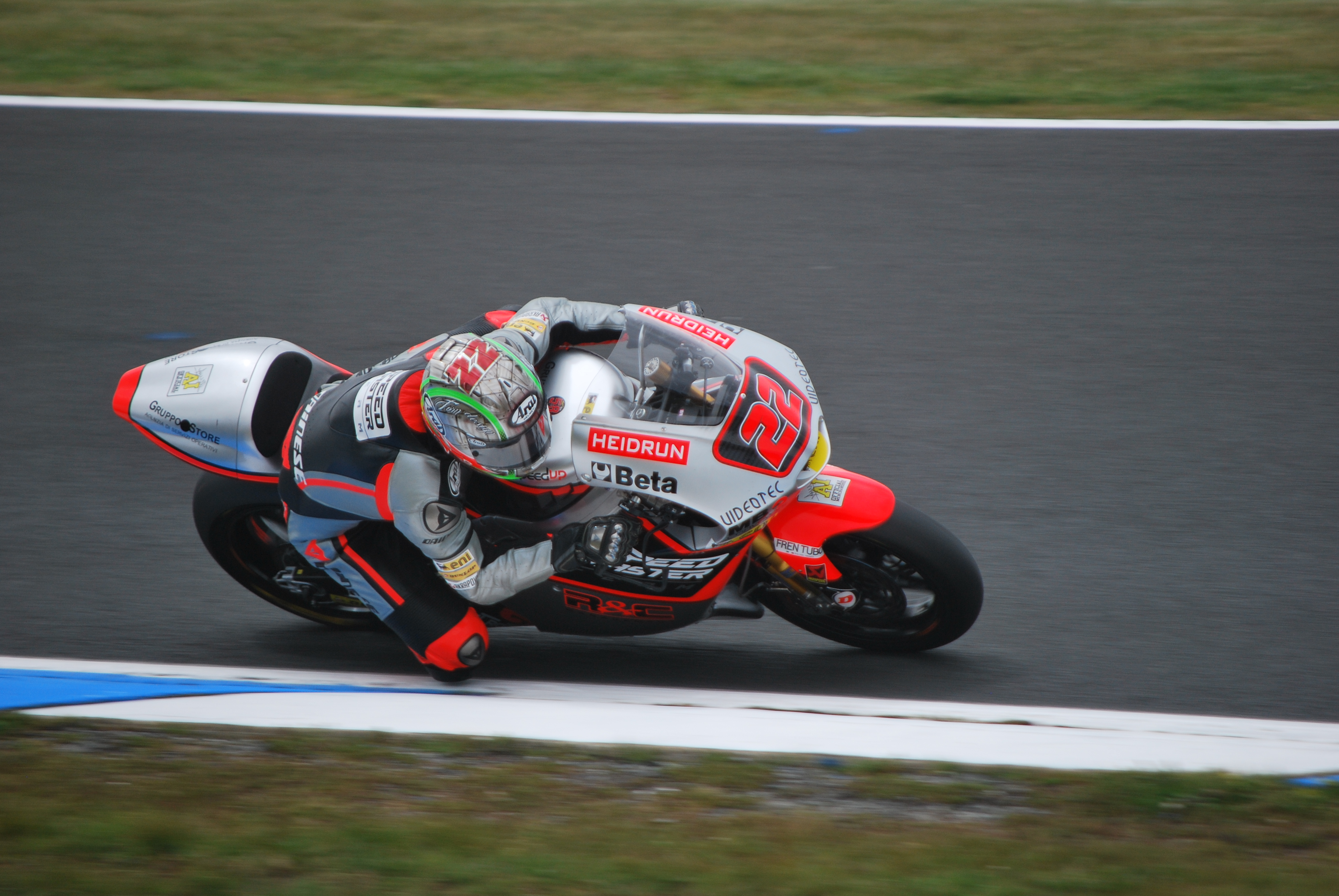
- Andreozzi at the 2012 Australian Grand Prix
- Nationality: Italian
- Born: 2 June 1991 (age 35); Macerata, Italy
- Current team: Speed Action
- Bike number: 21
Motorcycle racing career statistics
Moto2 World Championship
Active years	2011–2012
Manufacturers	FTR, Speed Up
2012 championship position	NC (0 pts)
Starts / Wins / Podiums / Poles / F. laps / Points; 12 / 0 / 0 / 0 / 0 / 0
Superbike World Championship
Active years	2014, 2017–2018
Manufacturers	Kawasaki, Yamaha
Championships	0
2018 championship position	30th (1 pt)
Starts / Wins / Podiums / Poles / F. laps / Points; 33 / 0 / 0 / 0 / 0 / 37
Supersport World Championship
Active years	2012
Manufacturers	Yamaha
Championships	0
2012 championship position	NC (0 pts)
Starts / Wins / Podiums / Poles / F. laps / Points; 1 / 0 / 0 / 0 / 0 / 0

Alessandro Andreozzi (born 2 June 1991) is an Italian motorcycle racer. He currently competes in the CIV Superbike Championship aboard a Yamaha YZF-R1. He has competed in the CIV Moto2 Championship, where he was champion in 2011, the Moto2 World Championship, the Supersport World Championship, the FIM Superstock 1000 Cup and the Superbike World Championship.

== Career statistics ==
=== Grand Prix motorcycle racing ===
==== By season ====
Season	Class	Motorcycle	Team	Race	Win	Podium	Pole	FLap	Pts	Plcd
2011	Moto2	FTR	Andreozzi Reparto Corse	1	0	0	0	0	0	NC
2012	Moto2	FTR	Andreozzi Reparto Corse	11	0	0	0	0	0	NC
2012	Moto2	Speed Up	S/Master Speed Up	11	0	0	0	0	0	NC
Total				**12**	**0**	**0**	**0**	**0**	**0**	

==== Races by year ====
(key) (Races in bold indicate pole position, races in italics indicate fastest lap)

Year	Class	Bike	1	2	3	4	5	6	7	8	9	10	11	12	13	14	15	16	17	Pos.	Pts
2011	Moto2	FTR	QAT	SPA	POR	FRA	CAT	GBR	NED	ITA	GER	CZE	INP	RSM; 29	ARA	JPN	AUS	MAL	VAL	NC	0
2012	Moto2	FTR	QAT	SPA	POR	FRA	CAT	GBR; 29	NED											NC	0
2012	Moto2	Speed Up								GER; Ret	ITA; Ret	INP; Ret	CZE; 24	RSM; 22	ARA; 30	JPN; 25	MAL; DSQ	AUS; 22	VAL; 23	NC	0

=== Supersport World Championship ===
==== Races by year ====
(key)

Year	Bike	1	2	3	4	5	6	7	8	9	10	11	12	13	Pos.	Pts
2012	Yamaha	AUS	ITA	NED	ITA	EUR	SMR; 20	SPA	CZE	GBR	RUS	GER	POR	FRA	NC	0

=== Superstock 1000 Cup ===
==== Races by year ====
(key) (Races in bold indicate pole position) (Races in italics indicate fastest lap)

Year	Bike	1	2	3	4	5	6	7	8	9	10	Pos	Pts
2013	Kawasaki	ARA; 12	NED; 14	MNZ; NC	ALG; 7	IMO; 8	SIL; 7	SIL; 5	NŰR; 12	MAG; 12	JER; 4	9th	64
2015	Aprilia	ARA	NED	IMO	DON	ALG	MIS	JER; 13	MAG; 7			21st	12
2016	Kawasaki/Ducati	ARA; 13	NED; Ret	IMO; 14	DON	MIS	LAU; 14	MAG; DNS	JER; Ret			25th	7

=== European Superstock 1000 Championship ===
==== Races by year ====
(key) (Races in bold indicate pole position) (Races in italics indicate fastest lap)

Year	Bike	1	2	3	4	5	6	7	8	9	Pos	Pts
2017	Yamaha	ARA	NED	IMO	DON	MIS; Ret	LAU	ALG	MAG	JER	NC	0
2018	Yamaha	ARA; 6	NED	IMO	DON	BRN	MIS	ALG	MAG		19th	10

=== Superbike World Championship ===
==== Races by year ====
Year	Bike	1		2		3		4		5		6		7		8		9		10		11		12		13		Pos.	Pts
Year	Bike	R1	R2	R1	R2	R1	R2	R1	R2	R1	R2	R1	R2	R1	R2	R1	R2	R1	R2	R1	R2	R1	R2	R1	R2	R1	R2	Pos.	Pts
2014	Kawasaki	AUS; Ret	AUS; 17	SPA; 19	SPA; 16	NED; 17	NED; Ret	ITA; 15	ITA; 17	GBR; 14	GBR; 15	MAL; 12	MAL; Ret	ITA; Ret	ITA; 15	POR; 15	POR; 16	USA; 16	USA; 9	SPA; 12	SPA; Ret	FRA; Ret	FRA; DNS	QAT; Ret	QAT; 15			19th	22
2017	Yamaha	AUS	AUS	THA	THA	SPA	SPA	NED	NED	ITA	ITA	GBR	GBR	ITA	ITA	USA	USA	GER	GER	POR; 17	POR; 12	FRA; 17	FRA; 13	SPA; 14	SPA; 14	QAT; Ret	QAT; 13	25th	14
2018	Yamaha	AUS	AUS	THA	THA	SPA	SPA	NED	NED	ITA	ITA	GBR	GBR	CZE	CZE	USA	USA	ITA; 15	ITA; Ret	POR	POR	FRA	FRA	ARG	ARG	QAT	QAT	30th	1

=== CIV National Superbike ===
==== Races by year ====
(key) (Races in bold indicate pole position; races in italics indicate fastest lap)

Year	Bike	1		2		3		4		5		6		Pos	Pts
Year	Bike	R1	R2	R1	R2	R1	R2	R1	R2	R1	R2	R1	R2	Pos	Pts
2022	Honda	MIS	MIS	VAL	VAL	MUG	MUG	MIS2	MIS2	MUG2; 7	MUG2; 6	IMO; 8	IMO; Ret	17th	27
