= 2015 Assen Superbike World Championship round =

(Netherlands) 2015 Assen Superbike World Championship round
Round details
- Round 4 of 13 rounds in the 2015 Superbike World Championship. and Round 4 of 12 rounds in the 2015 Supersport World Championship.
- Date: 19 April, 2015
- Location: Assen
- Course: Permanent racing facility 4.532 km (2.816 mi)

Superbike World Championship
Pole position
(United Kingdom) Tom Sykes
1:34.789
| Fastest lap race 1 | Fastest lap race 2 |
| (United Kingdom) Jonathan Rea | (United Kingdom) Chaz Davies |
| 1:35.889 | 1:35.992 |

Supersport World Championship
Pole position
(France) Jules Cluzel
1:38.015
Fastest lap
(France) Jules Cluzel
1:38.184

The 2015 Assen Superbike World Championship round was the fourth round of the 2015 Superbike World Championship and also the 2015 Supersport World Championship. It took place over the weekend of 17–19 April 2015 at the TT Circuit Assen located in Assen, Netherlands.

== Superbike race ==
=== Race 1 classification ===
| Pos | No. | Rider | Bike | Laps | Time | Grid | Points |
|---|---|---|---|---|---|---|---|
| 1 | 65 | (United Kingdom) Jonathan Rea | Kawasaki ZX-10R | 21 | 33:48.898 | 2 | 25 |
| 2 | 7 | (United Kingdom) Chaz Davies | Ducati Panigale R | 21 | +1.098 | 4 | 20 |
| 3 | 60 | (Netherlands) Michael Van Der Mark | Honda CBR1000RR SP | 21 | +4.140 | 5 | 16 |
| 4 | 91 | (United Kingdom) Leon Haslam | Aprilia RSV4 RF | 21 | +4.517 | 3 | 13 |
| 5 | 66 | (United Kingdom) Tom Sykes | Kawasaki ZX-10R | 21 | +6.140 | 1 | 11 |
| 6 | 81 | (Spain) Jordi Torres | Aprilia RSV4 RF | 21 | +11.007 | 8 | 10 |
| 7 | 112 | (Spain) Javier Forés | Ducati Panigale R | 21 | +15.029 | 7 | 9 |
| 8 | 1 | (France) Sylvain Guintoli | Honda CBR1000RR SP | 21 | +17.718 | 9 | 8 |
| 9 | 18 | (Spain) Nicolás Terol | Ducati Panigale R | 21 | +22.706 | 12 | 7 |
| 10 | 2 | (United Kingdom) Leon Camier | MV Agusta 1000 F4 | 21 | +22.867 | 11 | 6 |
| 11 | 36 | (Argentina) Leandro Mercado | Ducati Panigale R | 21 | +29.884 | 10 | 5 |
| 12 | 15 | (Italy) Matteo Baiocco | Ducati Panigale R | 21 | +36.816 | 13 | 4 |
| 13 | 40 | (Spain) Román Ramos | Kawasaki ZX-10R | 21 | +37.190 | 15 | 3 |
| 14 | 44 | (Spain) David Salom | Kawasaki ZX-10R | 21 | +46.675 | 16 | 2 |
| 15 | 59 | (Italy) Niccolò Canepa | EBR 1190 RX | 21 | +1:14.271 | 17 | 1 |
| 16 | 23 | (France) Christophe Ponsson | Kawasaki ZX-10R | 21 | +1:14.296 | 19 | |
| 17 | 51 | (Spain) Santiago Barragán | Kawasaki ZX-10R | 21 | +1:15.979 | 20 | |
| 18 | 75 | (Hungary) Gábor Rizmayer | BMW S1000RR | 20 | +1 lap | 23 | |
| Ret | 86 | (Italy) Ayrton Badovini | BMW S1000RR | 11 | Retirement | 14 | |
| Ret | 10 | (Hungary) Imre Tóth | BMW S1000RR | 9 | Technical problem | 24 | |
| Ret | 22 | (United Kingdom) Alex Lowes | Suzuki GSX-R1000 | 8 | Accident | 6 | |
| Ret | 14 | (France) Randy De Puniet | Suzuki GSX-R1000 | 8 | Accident | 18 | |
| Ret | 72 | (United States) Larry Pegram | EBR 1190 RX | 5 | Technical problem | 22 | |
| Ret | 90 | (Spain) Javier Alviz | Kawasaki ZX-10R | 0 | Accident | 21 | |
Report:

=== Race 2 classification ===
| Pos | No. | Rider | Bike | Laps | Time | Grid | Points |
|---|---|---|---|---|---|---|---|
| 1 | 65 | (United Kingdom) Jonathan Rea | Kawasaki ZX-10R | 21 | 33:51.013 | 2 | 25 |
| 2 | 7 | (United Kingdom) Chaz Davies | Ducati Panigale R | 21 | +0.439 | 4 | 20 |
| 3 | 60 | (Netherlands) Michael van der Mark | Honda CBR1000RR SP | 21 | +2.831 | 5 | 16 |
| 4 | 91 | (United Kingdom) Leon Haslam | Aprilia RSV4 RF | 21 | +2.992 | 3 | 13 |
| 5 | 66 | (United Kingdom) Tom Sykes | Kawasaki ZX-10R | 21 | +6.508 | 1 | 11 |
| 6 | 81 | (Spain) Jordi Torres | Aprilia RSV4 RF | 21 | +7.092 | 8 | 10 |
| 7 | 1 | (France) Sylvain Guintoli | Honda CBR1000RR SP | 21 | +11.190 | 9 | 9 |
| 8 | 112 | (Spain) Javier Forés | Ducati Panigale R | 21 | +15.636 | 7 | 8 |
| 9 | 22 | (United Kingdom) Alex Lowes | Suzuki GSX-R1000 | 21 | +16.402 | 6 | 7 |
| 10 | 2 | (United Kingdom) Leon Camier | MV Agusta 1000 F4 | 21 | +18.505 | 11 | 6 |
| 11 | 15 | (Italy) Matteo Baiocco | Ducati Panigale R | 21 | +21.459 | 13 | 5 |
| 12 | 86 | (Italy) Ayrton Badovini | BMW S1000RR | 21 | +21.977 | 14 | 4 |
| 13 | 44 | (Spain) David Salom | Kawasaki ZX-10R | 21 | +22.082 | 16 | 3 |
| 14 | 36 | (Argentina) Leandro Mercado | Ducati Panigale R | 21 | +22.928 | 10 | 2 |
| 15 | 40 | (Spain) Román Ramos | Kawasaki ZX-10R | 21 | +41.801 | 15 | 1 |
| 16 | 23 | (France) Christophe Ponsson | Kawasaki ZX-10R | 21 | +1:06.835 | 19 | |
| 17 | 90 | (Spain) Javier Alviz | Kawasaki ZX-10R | 20 | +1 lap | 21 | |
| 18 | 75 | (Hungary) Gábor Rizmayer | BMW S1000RR | 20 | +1 lap | 23 | |
| Ret | 59 | (Italy) Niccolò Canepa | EBR 1190 RX | 20 | Retirement | 17 | |
| Ret | 10 | (Hungary) Imre Tóth | BMW S1000RR | 15 | Retirement | 24 | |
| Ret | 51 | (Spain) Santiago Barragán | Kawasaki ZX-10R | 11 | Retirement | 20 | |
| Ret | 72 | (United States) Larry Pegram | EBR 1190 RX | 7 | Retirement | 22 | |
| Ret | 14 | (France) Randy De Puniet | Suzuki GSX-R1000 | 5 | Retirement | 18 | |
| Ret | 18 | (Spain) Nicolás Terol | Ducati Panigale R | 3 | Accident | 12 | |
Report:

== Supersport ==
=== Race classification ===
| Pos | No. | Rider | Bike | Laps | Time | Grid | Points |
|---|---|---|---|---|---|---|---|
| 1 | 54 | (Turkey) Kenan Sofuoğlu | Kawasaki ZX-6R | 18 | 29:44.434 | 2 | 25 |
| 2 | 16 | (France) Jules Cluzel | MV Agusta F3 675 | 18 | +0.879 | 1 | 20 |
| 3 | 111 | (United Kingdom) Kyle Smith | Honda CBR600RR | 18 | +0.908 | 4 | 16 |
| 4 | 99 | (United States) P. J. Jacobsen | Kawasaki ZX-6R | 18 | +3.413 | 3 | 13 |
| 5 | 44 | (Italy) Roberto Rolfo | Honda CBR600RR | 18 | +13.968 | 8 | 11 |
| 6 | 87 | (Italy) Lorenzo Zanetti | MV Agusta F3 675 | 18 | +15.093 | 5 | 10 |
| 7 | 14 | (France) Lucas Mahias | Kawasaki ZX-6R | 18 | +18.921 | 7 | 9 |
| 8 | 5 | (Italy) Marco Faccani | Kawasaki ZX-6R | 18 | +22.948 | 9 | 8 |
| 9 | 25 | (Italy) Alex Baldolini | MV Agusta F3 675 | 18 | +27.274 | 15 | 7 |
| 10 | 84 | (Italy) Riccardo Russo | Honda CBR600RR | 18 | +27.354 | 16 | 6 |
| 11 | 36 | (Colombia) Martín Cárdenas | Honda CBR600RR | 18 | +27.488 | 17 | 5 |
| 12 | 61 | (Italy) Fabio Menghi | Yamaha YZF-R6 | 18 | +32.056 | 13 | 4 |
| 13 | 6 | (Switzerland) Dominic Schmitter | Kawasaki ZX-6R | 18 | +44.517 | 14 | 3 |
| 14 | 4 | (United Kingdom) Gino Rea | Honda CBR600RR | 18 | +47.587 | 10 | 2 |
| 15 | 69 | (Italy) Luigi Morciano | Honda CBR600RR | 18 | +1:01.998 | 21 | 1 |
| 16 | 74 | (United Kingdom) Kieran Clarke | Honda CBR600RR | 18 | +1:02.051 | 19 | |
| 17 | 10 | (Spain) Nacho Calero | Honda CBR600RR | 18 | +1:15.837 | 20 | |
| 18 | 34 | (Argentina) Ezequiel Iturrioz | Kawasaki ZX-6R | 17 | +1 lap | 22 | |
| 19 | 9 | (Thailand) Ratthapark Wilairot | Honda CBR600RR | 16 | +2 lap | 11 | |
| Ret | 11 | (Italy) Christian Gamarino | Kawasaki ZX-6R | 12 | Accident | 6 | |
| Ret | 19 | (Germany) Kevin Wahr | Honda CBR600RR | 12 | Accident | 12 | |
| Ret | 68 | (Australia) Glenn Scott | Honda CBR600RR | 9 | Retirement | 18 | |
Report:
