= 2015 Sepang Superbike World Championship round =

2015 Superbike world championship

(Malaysia) 2015 Sepang Superbike World Championship round
Round details
- Round 10 of 13 rounds in the 2015 Superbike World Championship. and Round 9 of 12 rounds in the 2015 Supersport World Championship.
- Date: 2 August, 2015
- Location: Sepang
- Course: Permanent racing facility 5.543 km (3.444 mi)

Superbike World Championship
Pole position
(United Kingdom) Tom Sykes
2:03.240
Fastest lap race 1	Fastest lap race 2
(United Kingdom) Tom Sykes	(United Kingdom) Chaz Davies
2:03.654	2:04.707

Supersport World Championship
Pole position
(United States) P. J. Jacobsen
2:08.244
Fastest lap
(Turkey) Kenan Sofuoğlu
2:09.338

The 2015 Sepang Superbike World Championship round was the tenth round of the 2015 Superbike World Championship and also the ninth round of the 2015 Supersport World Championship. It took place over the weekend of 31 July–2 August 2015 at the Sepang International Circuit located in Selangor, Malaysia.

== Superbike race ==
=== Race 1 classification ===
Pos	No.	Rider	Bike	Laps	Time	Grid	Points
1	65	(United Kingdom) Jonathan Rea	Kawasaki ZX-10R	16	33:33.964	7	25
2	7	(United Kingdom) Chaz Davies	Ducati Panigale R	16	+0.121	6	20
3	3	(Italy) Max Biaggi	Aprilia RSV4 RF	16	+10.695	4	16
4	1	(France) Sylvain Guintoli	Honda CBR1000RR SP	16	+15.433	3	13
5	66	(United Kingdom) Tom Sykes	Kawasaki ZX-10R	16	+17.983	1	11
6	22	(United Kingdom) Alex Lowes	Suzuki GSX-R1000	16	+23.758	5	10
7	91	(United Kingdom) Leon Haslam	Aprilia RSV4 RF	16	+24.854	8	9
8	15	(Italy) Matteo Baiocco	Ducati Panigale R	16	+28.306	10	8
9	59	(Italy) Niccolò Canepa	Ducati Panigale R	16	+31.098	9	7
10	81	(Spain) Jordi Torres	Aprilia RSV4 RF	16	+34.105	2	6
11	44	(Spain) David Salom	Kawasaki ZX-10R	16	+37.107	16	5
12	14	(France) Randy De Puniet	Suzuki GSX-R1000	16	+37.378	11	4
13	2	(United Kingdom) Leon Camier	MV Agusta 1000 F4	16	+39.656	13	3
14	40	(Spain) Román Ramos	Kawasaki ZX-10R	16	+43.451	14	2
15	36	(Argentina) Leandro Mercado	Ducati Panigale R	16	+48.476	15	1
16	23	(France) Christophe Ponsson	Kawasaki ZX-10R	16	+1:01.166	18	
17	75	(Hungary) Gábor Rizmayer	BMW S1000RR	16	+1:24.006	19	
18	48	(Australia) Alex Phillis	Kawasaki ZX-10R	16	+1:31.093	20	
19	10	(Hungary) Imre Tóth	BMW S1000RR	16	+2:02.124	21	
Ret	45	(Italy) Gianluca Vizziello	Kawasaki ZX-10R	7	Accident	17	
Ret	60	(Netherlands) Michael Van Der Mark	Honda CBR1000RR SP	7	Technical problem	12	
DNS	86	(Italy) Ayrton Badovini	BMW S1000RR		Did not start		
Report:

=== Race 2 classification ===
Pos	No.	Rider	Bike	Laps	Time	Grid	Points
1	7	(United Kingdom) Chaz Davies	Ducati Panigale R	16	33:36.466	6	25
2	65	(United Kingdom) Jonathan Rea	Kawasaki ZX-10R	16	+0.091	7	20
3	81	(Spain) Jordi Torres	Aprilia RSV4 RF	16	+5.008	2	16
4	1	(France) Sylvain Guintoli	Honda CBR1000RR SP	16	+13.130	3	13
5	60	(Netherlands) Michael Van Der Mark	Honda CBR1000RR SP	16	+15.801	12	11
6	91	(United Kingdom) Leon Haslam	Aprilia RSV4 RF	16	+15.970	8	10
7	44	(Spain) David Salom	Kawasaki ZX-10R	16	+24.561	16	9
8	22	(United Kingdom) Alex Lowes	Suzuki GSX-R1000	16	+26.526	5	8
9	15	(Italy) Matteo Baiocco	Ducati Panigale R	16	+28.528	10	7
10	40	(Spain) Román Ramos	Kawasaki ZX-10R	16	+31.598	14	6
11	59	(Italy) Niccolò Canepa	Ducati Panigale R	16	+33.568	9	5
12	2	(United Kingdom) Leon Camier	MV Agusta 1000 F4	16	+34.906	13	4
13	14	(France) Randy De Puniet	Suzuki GSX-R1000	16	+46.521	11	3
14	66	(United Kingdom) Tom Sykes	Kawasaki ZX-10R	16	+48.964	1	2
15	36	(Argentina) Leandro Mercado	Ducati Panigale R	16	+49.865	15	1
16	23	(France) Christophe Ponsson	Kawasaki ZX-10R	16	+1:04.171	18	
17	45	(Italy) Gianluca Vizziello	Kawasaki ZX-10R	16	+1:24.837	17	
18	75	(Hungary) Gábor Rizmayer	BMW S1000RR	16	+1:25.068	19	
19	48	(Australia) Alex Phillis	Kawasaki ZX-10R	16	+1:34.051	20	
20	10	(Hungary) Imre Tóth	BMW S1000RR	16	+2:00.907	21	
Ret	3	(Italy) Max Biaggi	Aprilia RSV4 RF	1	Retirement	4	
DNS	86	(Italy) Ayrton Badovini	BMW S1000RR		Did not start		
Report:

== Supersport ==
=== Race classification ===
Pos	No.	Rider	Bike	Laps	Time	Grid	Points
1	99	(United States) P. J. Jacobsen	Honda CBR600RR	14	30:21.294	1	25
2	16	(France) Jules Cluzel	MV Agusta F3 675	14	+0.091	3	20
3	87	(Italy) Lorenzo Zanetti	MV Agusta F3 675	14	+3.387	5	16
4	54	(Turkey) Kenan Sofuoğlu	Kawasaki ZX-6R	14	+3.456	2	13
5	111	(United Kingdom) Kyle Smith	Honda CBR600RR	14	+9.507	7	11
6	44	(Italy) Roberto Rolfo	Honda CBR600RR	14	+15.835	4	10
7	36	(Colombia) Martín Cárdenas	Honda CBR600RR	14	+16.281	11	9
8	4	(United Kingdom) Gino Rea	Honda CBR600RR	14	+16.298	6	8
9	11	(Italy) Christian Gamarino	Kawasaki ZX-6R	14	+19.628	9	7
10	25	(Italy) Alex Baldolini	MV Agusta F3 675	14	+20.959	8	6
11	6	(Switzerland) Dominic Scmitter	Kawasaki ZX-6R	14	+32.332	14	5
12	61	(Italy) Fabio Menghi	Yamaha YZF-R6	14	+32.397	13	4
13	19	(Germany) Kevin Wahr	Honda CBR600RR	14	+32.387	12	3
14	41	(Australia) Aiden Wagner	Honda CBR600RR	14	+32.890	15	2
15	24	(Spain) Marcos Ramírez	Honda CBR600RR	14	+39.394	18	1
16	5	(Italy) Marco Faccani	Kawasaki ZX-6R	14	+40.426	10	
17	59	(Thailand) Ratthapong Wilairot	Honda CBR600RR	14	+40.659	16	
18	10	(Spain) Nacho Calero	Honda CBR600RR	14	+1:09.545	19	
Ret	68	(Australia) Glenn Scott	Honda CBR600RR	10	Technical problem	17	
Report:
