= 2015 Donington Park Superbike World Championship round =

(United Kingdom) 2015 Donington Park Superbike World Championship round
Round details
- Round 6 of 13 rounds in the 2015 Superbike World Championship. and Round 6 of 12 rounds in the 2015 Supersport World Championship.
- Date: 24 May, 2015
- Location: Donington Park
- Course: Permanent racing facility 4.020 km (2.498 mi)

Superbike World Championship
Pole position
(United Kingdom) Tom Sykes
1:27.071
Fastest lap race 1	Fastest lap race 2
(United Kingdom) Jonathan Rea	(United Kingdom) Tom Sykes
1:27.914	1:27.640

Supersport World Championship
Pole position
(Turkey) Kenan Sofuoğlu
1:29.925
Fastest lap
(France) Jules Cluzel
1:30.425

The 2015 Donington Park Superbike World Championship round was the sixth round of the 2015 Superbike World Championship and also the 2015 Supersport World Championship. It took place over the weekend of 22–24 May 2015 at the Donington Park located in Leicestershire, England.

== Superbike race ==
=== Race 1 classification ===
Pos	No.	Rider	Bike	Laps	Time	Grid	Points
1	66	(United Kingdom) Tom Sykes	Kawasaki ZX-10R	23	33:59.865	1	25
2	65	(United Kingdom) Jonathan Rea	Kawasaki ZX-10R	23	+3.743	2	20
3	7	(United Kingdom) Chaz Davies	Ducati Panigale R	23	+15.140	6	16
4	91	(United Kingdom) Leon Haslam	Aprilia RSV4 RF	23	+18.304	4	13
5	86	(Italy) Ayrton Badovini	BMW S1000RR	23	+20.362	11	11
6	22	(United Kingdom) Alex Lowes	Suzuki GSX-R1000	23	+20.848	5	10
7	81	(Spain) Jordi Torres	Aprilia RSV4 RF	23	+21.807	13	9
8	1	(France) Sylvain Guintoli	Honda CBR1000RR SP	23	+24.346	9	8
9	2	(United Kingdom) Leon Camier	MV Agusta 1000 F4	23	+30.570	9	7
10	44	(Spain) David Salom	Kawasaki ZX-10R	23	+39.074	10	6
11	36	(Argentina) Leandro Mercado	Ducati Panigale R	23	+44.023	15	5
12	18	(Spain) Nicolás Terol	Ducati Panigale R	23	+46.925	14	4
13	40	(Spain) Román Ramos	Kawasaki ZX-10R	23	+50.871	16	3
14	14	(France) Randy De Puniet	Suzuki GSX-R1000	23	+1:06.993	18	2
15	59	(Italy) Niccolò Canepa	Kawasaki ZX-10R	23	+1:09.883	19	1
16	23	(France) Christophe Ponsson	Kawasaki ZX-10R	23	+1:26.098	17	
17	34	(Italy) Davide Giugliano	Ducati Panigale R	22	+1 lap	3	
18	75	(Hungary) Gábor Rizmayer	BMW S1000RR	22	+1 lap	22	
19	10	(Hungary) Imre Tóth	BMW S1000RR	22	+1 lap	21	
Ret	51	(Spain) Santiago Barragán	Kawasaki ZX-10R	17	Retirement	20	
Ret	15	(Italy) Matteo Baiocco	Ducati Panigale R	13	Accident	8	
Ret	60	(Netherlands) Michael Van Der Mark	Honda CBR1000RR SP	8	Retirement	12	
Report:

=== Race 2 classification ===
Pos	No.	Rider	Bike	Laps	Time	Grid	Points
1	66	(United Kingdom) Tom Sykes	Kawasaki ZX-10R	23	33:52.649	1	25
2	65	(United Kingdom) Jonathan Rea	Kawasaki ZX-10R	23	+9.772	2	20
3	7	(United Kingdom) Chaz Davies	Ducati Panigale R	23	+12.304	6	16
4	91	(United Kingdom) Leon Haslam	Aprilia RSV4 RF	23	+15.601	4	13
5	34	(Italy) Davide Giugliano	Ducati Panigale R	23	+15.779	3	11
6	22	(United Kingdom) Alex Lowes	Suzuki GSX-R1000	23	+23.136	5	10
7	81	(Spain) Jordi Torres	Aprilia RSV4 RF	23	+26.674	13	9
8	1	(France) Sylvain Guintoli	Honda CBR1000RR SP	23	+27.206	9	8
9	86	(Italy) Ayrton Badovini	BMW S1000RR	23	+31.469	11	7
10	15	(Italy) Matteo Baiocco	Ducati Panigale R	23	+34.659	8	6
11	40	(Spain) Román Ramos	Kawasaki ZX-10R	23	+36.298	16	5
12	44	(Spain) David Salom	Kawasaki ZX-10R	23	+36.682	10	4
13	36	(Argentina) Leandro Mercado	Ducati Panigale R	23	+1:17.739	15	3
14	14	(France) Randy De Puniet	Suzuki GSX-R1000	23	+1:24.434	18	2
15	51	(Spain) Santiago Barragán	Kawasaki ZX-10R	23	+1:24.601	20	1
16	75	(Hungary) Gábor Rizmayer	BMW S1000RR	22	+1 lap	22	
17	10	(Hungary) Imre Tóth	BMW S1000RR	22	+1 lap	21	
Ret	23	(France) Christophe Ponsson	Kawasaki ZX-10R	7	Accident	17	
Ret	18	(Spain) Nicolás Terol	Ducati Panigale R	6	Accident	14	
Ret	59	(Italy) Niccolò Canepa	Kawasaki ZX-10R	4	Retirement	19	
Ret	60	(Netherlands) Michael Van Der Mark	Honda CBR1000RR SP	4	Retirement	12	
Ret	2	(United Kingdom) Leon Camier	MV Agusta 1000 F4	3	Retirement	7	
Report:

== Supersport ==
=== Race classification ===
Pos	No.	Rider	Bike	Laps	Time	Grid	Points
1	54	(Turkey) Kenan Sofuoğlu	Kawasaki ZX-6R	20	30:20.711	1	25
2	16	(France) Jules Cluzel	MV Agusta F3 675	20	+0.891	3	20
3	77	(United Kingdom) Kyle Ryde	Yamaha YZF-R6	20	+7.968	2	16
4	87	(Italy) Lorenzo Zanetti	MV Agusta F3 675	20	+8.124	5	13
5	99	(United States) P. J. Jacobsen	Kawasaki ZX-6R	20	+12.388	6	11
6	70	(United Kingdom) Luke Stapleford	Triumph 675 R	20	+16.135	4	10
7	94	(United Kingdom) Sam Hornsey	Triumph 675 R	20	+22.879	7	9
8	4	(United Kingdom) Gino Rea	Honda CBR600RR	20	+29.055	8	8
9	66	(Finland) Niki Tuuli	Yamaha YZF-R6	20	+35.607	16	7
10	67	(United Kingdom) Andy Reid	Honda CBR600RR	20	+36.043	13	6
11	44	(Italy) Roberto Rolfo	Honda CBR600RR	20	+36.758	9	5
12	84	(Italy) Riccardo Russo	Honda CBR600RR	20	+40.545	15	4
13	36	(Colombia) Martín Cárdenas	Honda CBR600RR	20	+43.813	17	3
14	11	(Italy) Christian Gamarino	Kawasaki ZX-6R	20	+47.071	14	2
15	74	(United Kingdom) Kieran Clarke	Honda CBR600RR	20	+50.450	22	1
16	68	(Australia) Glenn Scott	Honda CBR600RR	20	+50.852	21	
17	24	(Spain) Marcos Ramírez	Honda CBR600RR	20	+1:16.406	28	
18	10	(Spain) Nacho Calero	Honda CBR600RR	20	+1:19.071	25	
Ret	41	(Australia) Aiden Wagner	Kawasaki ZX-6R	17	Accident	19	
Ret	14	(France) Lucas Mahias	Kawasaki ZX-6R	16	Retirement	20	
Ret	34	(Argentina) Ezequiel Iturrioz	Kawasaki ZX-6R	14	Retirement	27	
Ret	61	(Italy) Fabio Menghi	Yamaha YZF-R6	10	Retirement	10	
Ret	5	(Italy) Marco Faccani	Kawasaki ZX-6R	10	Retirement	24	
Ret	19	(Germany) Kevin Wahr	Honda CBR600RR	7	Technical problem	11	
Ret	25	(Italy) Alex Baldolini	MV Agusta F3 675	7	Technical problem	18	
Ret	111	(United Kingdom) Kyle Smith	Honda CBR600RR	3	Accident	12 (Note: 3 place grid penalty.)	
Ret	161	(Russia) Alexey Ivanov	Yamaha YZF-R6	0	Accident	26	
Ret	6	(Switzerland) Dominic Schmitter	Kawasaki ZX-6R	0	Accident	23	
Report:
