= 2015 Aragon Superbike World Championship round =

(Spain) 2015 Aragon Superbike World Championship round
Round details
- Round 3 of 13 rounds in the 2015 Superbike World Championship. and Round 3 of 12 rounds in the 2015 Supersport World Championship.
- Date: 12 April, 2015
- Location: Aragón
- Course: Permanent racing facility 5.078 km (3.155 mi)

Superbike World Championship
Pole position
(United Kingdom) Leon Haslam
1:49.664
Fastest lap race 1	Fastest lap race 2
(United Kingdom) Tom Sykes	(United Kingdom) Chaz Davies
1:50.890	1:51.156

Supersport World Championship
Pole position
(France) Jules Cluzel
1:53.138
Fastest lap
(United States) P. J. Jacobsen
1:54.605

The 2015 Aragon Superbike World Championship round was the third round of the 2015 Superbike World Championship and also the 2015 Supersport World Championship. It took place over the weekend of 10–12 April 2015 at the Motorland Aragón located in Alcañiz, Spain.

== Superbike race ==
=== Race 1 classification ===
Pos	No.	Rider	Bike	Laps	Time	Grid	Points
1	65	(United Kingdom) Jonathan Rea	Kawasaki ZX-10R	18	33:36.937	4	25
2	7	(United Kingdom) Chaz Davies	Ducati Panigale R	18	+0.051	2	20
3	66	(United Kingdom) Tom Sykes	Kawasaki ZX-10R	18	+4.977	3	16
4	91	(United Kingdom) Leon Haslam	Aprilia RSV4 RF	18	+15.088	1	13
5	81	(Spain) Jordi Torres	Aprilia RSV4 RF	18	+15.290	7	11
6	112	(Spain) Javier Forés	Ducati Panigale R	18	+16.655	5	10
7	18	(Spain) Nicolás Terol	Ducati Panigale R	18	+17.365	9	9
8	36	(Argentina) Leandro Mercado	Ducati Panigale R	18	+25.527	10	8
9	1	(France) Sylvain Guintoli	Honda CBR1000RR SP	18	+31.464	14	7
10	2	(United Kingdom) Leon Camier	MV Agusta 1000 F4	18	+43.013	15	6
11	51	(Spain) Santiago Barragán	Kawasaki ZX-10R	18	+43.627	20	5
12	15	(Italy) Matteo Baiocco	Ducati Panigale R	18	+44.893	13	4
13	40	(Spain) Román Ramos	Kawasaki ZX-10R	18	+47.663	18	3
14	23	(France) Christophe Ponsson	Kawasaki ZX-10R	18	+1:11.843	17	2
15	59	(Italy) Niccolò Canepa	EBR 1190 RX	18	+1:15.919	16	1
16	90	(Spain) Javier Alviz	Kawasaki ZX-10R	18	+1:20.816	21	
17	72	(United States) Larry Pegram	EBR 1190 RX	18	+1:22.279	22	
18	10	(Hungary) Imre Tóth	BMW S1000RR	17	+1 lap	23	
19	75	(Hungary) Gábor Rizmayer	BMW S1000RR	17	+1 lap	24	
NC	22	(United Kingdom) Alex Lowes	Suzuki GSX-R1000	13	+5 lap	8	
Ret	86	(Italy) Ayrton Badovini	BMW S1000RR	16	Accident	6	
Ret	60	(Netherlands) Michael Van Der Mark	Honda CBR1000RR SP	9	Technical	11	
Ret	14	(France) Randy De Puniet	Suzuki GSX-R1000	7	Retirement	19	
Ret	44	(Spain) David Salom	Kawasaki ZX-10R	6	Retirement	12	
Report:

=== Race 2 classification ===
Pos	No.	Rider	Bike	Laps	Time	Grid	Points
1	7	(United Kingdom) Chaz Davies	Ducati Panigale R	18	+33:34.669	2	25
2	65	(United Kingdom) Jonathan Rea	Kawasaki ZX-10R	18	+3.190	4	20
3	91	(United Kingdom) Leon Haslam	Aprilia RSV4 RF	18	+3.712	1	16
4	81	(Spain) Jordi Torres	Aprilia RSV4 RF	18	+14.216	7	13
5	112	(Spain) Javier Forés	Ducati Panigale R	18	+20.524	5	11
6	44	(Spain) David Salom	Kawasaki ZX-10R	18	+25.878	12	10
7	36	(Argentina) Leandro Mercado	Ducati Panigale R	18	+25.939	10	9
8	60	(Netherlands) Michael Van Der Mark	Honda CBR1000RR SP	18	+26.075	11	8
9	86	(Italy) Ayrton Badovini	BMW S1000RR	18	+27.253	6	7
10	18	(Spain) Nicolás Terol	Ducati Panigale R	18	+28.666	9	6
11	15	(Italy) Matteo Baiocco	Ducati Panigale R	18	+41.038	13	5
12	40	(Spain) Román Ramos	Kawasaki ZX-10R	18	+41.983	18	4
13	14	(France) Randy De Puniet	Suzuki GSX-R1000	18	+42.961	19	3
14	22	(United Kingdom) Alex Lowes	Suzuki GSX-R1000	18	+43.057	8	2
15	2	(United Kingdom) Leon Camier	MV Agusta 1000 F4	18	+43.375	15	1
16	23	(France) Christophe Ponsson	Kawasaki ZX-10R	18	+59.139	17	
17	51	(Spain) Santiago Barragán	Kawasaki ZX-10R	18	+59.296	20	
18	59	(Italy) Niccolò Canepa	EBR 1190 RX	18	+1:16.004	16	
19	72	(United States) Larry Pegram	EBR 1190 RX	18	+1:33.714	22	
20	10	(Hungary) Imre Tóth	BMW S1000RR	17	+1 lap	23	
Ret	90	(Spain) Javier Alviz	Kawasaki ZX-10R	7	Retirement	21	
Ret	1	(France) Sylvain Guintoli	Honda CBR1000RR SP	5	Accident	14	
Ret	66	(United Kingdom) Tom Sykes	Kawasaki ZX-10R	4	Accident	3	
DNS	75	(Hungary) Gábor Rizmayer	BMW S1000RR	0	Did not start	24	
Report:

== Supersport ==
=== Race classification ===
Pos	No.	Rider	Bike	Laps	Time	Grid	Points
1	54	(Turkey) Kenan Sofuoğlu	Kawasaki ZX-6R	16	30:47.195	2	25
2	99	(United States) P. J. Jacobsen	Kawasaki ZX-6R	16	+3.224	3	20
3	111	(United Kingdom) Kyle Smith	Honda CBR600RR	16	+5.695	4	16
4	4	(United Kingdom) Gino Rea	Honda CBR600RR	16	+11.281	7	13
5	87	(Italy) Lorenzo Zanetti	MV Agusta F3 675	16	+11.334	6	11
6	25	(Italy) Alex Baldolini	MV Agusta F3 675	16	+16.639	17	10
7	61	(Italy) Fabio Menghi	Yamaha YZF-R6	16	+17.010	10	9
8	6	(Switzerland) Dominic Schmitter	Kawasaki ZX-6R	16	+18.801	11	8
9	11	(Italy) Christian Gamarino	Kawasaki ZX-6R	16	+24.178	14	7
10	44	(Italy) Roberto Rolfo	Honda CBR600RR	16	+24.655	13	6
11	84	(Italy) Riccardo Russo	Honda CBR600RR	16	+24.735	16	5
12	19	(Germany) Kevin Wahr	Honda CBR600RR	16	+25.379	15	4
13	161	(Russia) Alexey Ivanov	Yamaha YZF-R6	16	+44.591	18	3
14	24	(Spain) Marcos Ramírez	Yamaha YZF-R6	16	+44.670	20	2
15	69	(Italy) Luigi Morciano	Honda CBR600RR	16	+55.579	23	1
16	74	(United Kingdom) Kieran Clarke	Honda CBR600RR	16	+55.771	22	
17	10	(Spain) Nacho Calero	Honda CBR600RR	16	+56.061	21	
18	68	(Australia) Glenn Scott	Honda CBR600RR	16	+1:00.312	19	
19	42	(Spain) Jorge Arroyo	Yamaha YZF-R6	16	+1:18.392	24	
20	34	(Argentina) Ezequiel Iturrioz	Kawasaki ZX-6R	16	+1:29.629	25	
Ret	16	(France) Jules Cluzel	MV Agusta F3 675	10	Technical	1	
Ret	36	(Colombia) Martín Cárdenas	Honda CBR600RR	7	Retirement	12	
Ret	14	(France) Lucas Mahias	Kawasaki ZX-6R	5	Retirement	5	
Ret	5	(Italy) Marco Faccani	Kawasaki ZX-6R	4	Accident	9	
Ret	9	(Thailand) Ratthapark Wilairot	Honda CBR600RR	4	Accident	8	
Report:
