= 2015 Phillip Island Superbike World Championship round =

(Australia) 2015 Phillip Island Superbike World Championship round
Round details
- Round 1 of 13 rounds in the 2015 Superbike World Championship. and Round 1 of 12 rounds in the 2015 Supersport World Championship.
- Date: 22 February, 2015
- Location: Phillip Island
- Course: Permanent racing facility 4.445 km (2.762 mi)

Superbike World Championship
Pole position
(United Kingdom) Jonathan Rea
1:31.212
Fastest lap race 1	Fastest lap race 2
(United Kingdom) Leon Haslam	(United Kingdom) Chaz Davies
1:31.826	1:31.725

Supersport World Championship
Pole position
(France) Jules Cluzel
1:33.379
Fastest lap
(Turkey) Kenan Sofuoğlu
1:33.409

The 2015 Phillip Island Superbike World Championship round was the first round of the 2015 Superbike World Championship and also the 2015 Supersport World Championship. It took place over the weekend of 20–22 February 2015 at the Phillip Island Grand Prix Circuit located in Cowes, Victoria, Australia.

== Superbike race ==
=== Race 1 classification ===
Pos	No.	Rider	Bike	Laps	Time	Grid	Points
1	65	(United Kingdom) Jonathan Rea	Kawasaki ZX-10R	22	33.58.385	1	25
2	91	(United Kingdom) Leon Haslam	Aprilia RSV4 RF	22	+0.039	3	20
3	7	(United Kingdom) Chaz Davies	Ducati Panigale R	22	+0.496	2	16
4	81	(Spain) Jordi Torres	Aprilia RSV4 RF	22	+2.259	7	13
5	60	(Netherlands) Michael Van Der Mark	Honda CBR1000RR SP	22	+9.838	4	11
6	66	(United Kingdom) Tom Sykes	Kawasaki ZX-10R	22	+13.761	8	10
7	1	(France) Sylvain Guintoli	Honda CBR1000RR SP	22	+14.021	9	9
8	18	(Spain) Nicolás Terol	Ducati Panigale R	22	+15.954	6	8
9	22	(United Kingdom) Alex Lowes	Suzuki GSX-R1000	22	+21.106	5	7
10	2	(United Kingdom) Leon Camier	MV Agusta 1000 F4	22	+24.771	13	6
11	15	(Italy) Matteo Baiocco	Ducati Panigale R	22	+28.920	10	5
12	36	(Argentina) Leandro Mercado	Ducati Panigale R	22	+35.929	22	4
13	21	(Australia) Troy Bayliss	Ducati Panigale R	22	+40.315	12	3
14	77	(Australia) Jed Metcher	Kawasaki ZX-10R	22	+45.090	14	2
15	20	(France) Sylvain Barrier	BMW S1000RR	22	+46.444	16	1
16	40	(Spain) Román Ramos	Kawasaki ZX-10R	22	+53.331	17	
17	14	(France) Randy De Puniet	Suzuki GSX-R1000	22	+58.811	11	
18	72	(United States) Larry Pegram	EBR 1190 RX	22	+1:06.071	19	
19	51	(Spain) Santiago Barragán	Kawasaki ZX-10R	22	+1:06.110	18	
20	10	(Hungary) Imre Tóth	BMW S1000RR	21	+1 lap	21	
Ret	59	(Italy) Niccolò Canepa	EBR 1190 RX	15	Accident	16	
Ret	23	(France) Christophe Ponsson	Kawasaki ZX-10R	9	Retirement	20	
DNS	44	(Spain) David Salom	Kawasaki ZX-10R		Did not start		
DNS	12	(Australia) Matthew Walters	Kawasaki ZX-10R		Did not start		
DNS	75	(Hungary) Gábor Rizmayer	BMW S1000RR		Did not start		
Report:

=== Race 2 classification ===
Pos	No.	Rider	Bike	Laps	Time	Grid	Points
1	91	(United Kingdom) Leon Haslam	Aprilia RSV4 RF	22	33.58.711	3	25
2	65	(United Kingdom) Jonathan Rea	Kawasaki ZX-10R	22	+0.010	1	20
3	7	(United Kingdom) Chaz Davies	Ducati Panigale R	22	+0.298	2	16
4	66	(United Kingdom) Tom Sykes	Kawasaki ZX-10R	22	+5.242	8	13
5	1	(France) Sylvain Guintoli	Honda CBR1000RR SP	22	+14.649	9	11
6	18	(Spain) Nicolás Terol	Ducati Panigale R	22	+16.025	6	10
7	14	(France) Randy De Puniet	Suzuki GSX-R1000	22	+22.300	11	9
8	2	(United Kingdom) Leon Camier	MV Agusta 1000 F4	22	+23.606	13	8
9	15	(Italy) Matteo Baiocco	Ducati Panigale R	22	+23.818	10	7
10	40	(Spain) Román Ramos	Kawasaki ZX-10R	22	+35.775	16	6
11	36	(Argentina) Leandro Mercado	Kawasaki ZX-10R	22	+39.929	21	5
12	20	(France) Sylvain Barrier	BMW S1000RR	22	+46.267	15	4
13	51	(Spain) Santiago Barragán	Kawasaki ZX-10R	22	+57.893	17	3
14	72	(United States) Larry Pegram	EBR 1190 RX	22	+1:02.676	18	2
15	23	(France) Christophe Ponsson	Kawasaki ZX-10R	22	+1:05.262	19	1
16	21	(Australia) Troy Bayliss	Ducati Panigale R	21	+1 lap	12	
17	10	(Hungary) Imre Tóth	BMW S1000RR	21	+1 lap	20	
Ret	60	(Netherlands) Michael Van Der Mark	Honda CBR1000RR SP	18	Accident	4	
Ret	81	(Spain) Jordi Torres	Aprilia RSV4 RF	17	Accident	7	
Ret	77	(Australia) Jed Metcher	Kawasaki ZX-10R	3	Retirement	14	
Ret	22	(United Kingdom) Alex Lowes	Suzuki GSX-R1000	1	Retirement	5	
DNS	59	(Italy) Niccolò Canepa	EBR 1190 RX		Did not start		
DNS	44	(Spain) David Salom	Kawasaki ZX-10R		Did not start		
DNS	12	(Australia) Matthew Walters	Kawasaki ZX-10R		Did not start		
DNS	75	(Hungary) Gábor Rizmayer	BMW S1000RR		Did not start		
Report:

== Supersport ==
=== Race classification ===
Pos	No.	Rider	Bike	Laps	Time	Grid	Points
1	16	(France) Jules Cluzel	MV Agusta F3 675	18	28:19.638	1	25
2	87	(Italy) Lorenzo Zanetti	MV Agusta F3 675	18	+3.494	3	20
3	4	(United Kingdom) Gino Rea	Honda CBR600RR	18	+8.636	4	16
4	111	(United Kingdom) Kyle Smith	Honda CBR600RR	18	+8.668	5	13
5	9	(Thailand) Ratthapark Wilairot	Honda CBR600RR	18	+10.613	6	11
6	54	(Turkey) Kenan Sofuoğlu	Kawasaki ZX-6R	18	+18.608	2	10
7	25	(Italy) Alex Baldolini	MV Agusta F3 675	18	+18.701	16	9
8	44	(Italy) Roberto Rolfo	Honda CBR600RR	18	+18.741	8	8
9	6	(Switzerland) Dominic Schmitter	Kawasaki ZX-6R	18	+21.333	9	7
10	99	(United States) P. J. Jacobsen	Kawasaki ZX-6R	18	+26.448	13	6
11	11	(Italy) Christian Gamarino	Kawasaki ZX-6R	18	+26.979	19	5
12	5	(Italy) Marco Faccani	Kawasaki ZX-6R	18	+26.992	15	4
13	41	(Australia) Aiden Wagner	Yamaha YZF-R6	18	+34.058	12	3
14	68	(Australia) Glenn Scott	Honda CBR600RR	18	+36.066	18	2
15	61	(Italy) Fabio Menghi	Yamaha YZF-R6	18	+36.624	11	1
16	19	(Germany) Kevin Wahr	Honda CBR600RR	18	+37.284	17	
17	20	(Australia) Alex Phillis	Honda CBR600RR	18	+42.091	20	
18	74	(United Kingdom) Kieran Clarke	Honda CBR600RR	18	+1:07.842	21	
19	24	(Spain) Marcos Ramírez	Kawasaki ZX-6R	18	+1:07.976	22	
Ret	84	(Italy) Riccardo Russo	Honda CBR600RR	15	Retirement	10	
Ret	36	(Colombia) Martín Cárdenas	Honda CBR600RR	14	Retirement	14	
Ret	14	(France) Lucas Mahias	Kawasaki ZX-6R	13	Retirement	7	
Ret	10	(Spain) Nacho Calero	Kawasaki ZX-6R	13	Retirement	23	
DNS	27	(Australia) Sam Lambert	Triumph Daytona 675		Did not start		
Report:
