= 2015 Imola Superbike World Championship round =

(Italy) 2015 Imola Superbike World Championship round
Round details
- Round 5 of 13 rounds in the 2015 Superbike World Championship. and Round 5 of 12 rounds in the 2015 Supersport World Championship.
- Date: 10 May, 2015
- Location: Imola
- Course: Permanent racing facility 4.936 km (3.067 mi)

Superbike World Championship
Pole position
(Italy) Davide Giugliano
1:46.382
Fastest lap race 1	Fastest lap race 2
(United Kingdom) Tom Sykes	(United Kingdom) Jonathan Rea
1:46.707	1:47.198

Supersport World Championship
Pole position
(France) Jules Cluzel
1:50.856
Fastest lap
(France) Jules Cluzel
1:51.101

The 2015 Imola Superbike World Championship round was the fifth round of the 2015 Superbike World Championship and also the 2015 Supersport World Championship. It took place over the weekend of 8–10 May 2015 at the Autodromo Enzo e Dino Ferrari located in Imola, Emilia-Romagna, Italy.

== Superbike race ==
=== Race 1 classification ===
The race was stopped after 10 lap due to an accident involving David Salom, the race was later restarted for 6 laps.

Pos	No.	Rider	Bike	Laps	Time	Grid	Points
1	65	(United Kingdom) Jonathan Rea	Kawasaki ZX-10R	6	10:43.252	3	25
2	66	(United Kingdom) Tom Sykes	Kawasaki ZX-10R	6	+0.482	2	20
3	34	(Italy) Davide Giugliano	Ducati Panigale R	6	+3.945	1	16
4	91	(United Kingdom) Leon Haslam	Aprilia RSV4 RF	6	+7.455	5	13
5	1	(France) Sylvain Guintoli	Honda CBR1000RR SP	6	+11.925	15	11
6	86	(Italy) Ayrton Badovini	BMW S1000RR	6	+12.074	8	10
7	36	(Argentina) Leandro Mercado	Ducati Panigale R	6	+12.789	7	9
8	15	(Italy) Matteo Baiocco	Ducati Panigale R	6	+13.712	14	8
9	60	(Netherlands) Michael Van Der Mark	Honda CBR1000RR SP	6	+13.863	9	7
10	84	(Italy) Michel Fabrizio	Ducati Panigale R	6	+14.637	13	6
11	40	(Spain) Román Ramos	Kawasaki ZX-10R	6	+16.990	16	5
12	22	(United Kingdom) Alex Lowes	Suzuki GSX-R1000	6	+21.123	11	4
13	51	(Spain) Santiago Barragán	Kawasaki ZX-10R	6	+32.443	18	3
14	23	(France) Christophe Ponsson	Kawasaki ZX-10R	6	+32.977	19	2
15	10	(Hungary) Imre Tóth	BMW S1000RR	6	+39.711	20	1
16	75	(Hungary) Gábor Rizmayer	BMW S1000RR	6	+40.821	21	
Ret	2	(United Kingdom) Leon Camier	MV Agusta 1000 F4	3	Accident	12	
Ret	44	(Spain) David Salom	Kawasaki ZX-10R	0	Accident (Original attempt)	10	
Ret	81	(Spain) Jordi Torres	Aprilia RSV4 RF	0	Accident (Original attempt)	6	
Ret	7	(United Kingdom) Chaz Davies	Ducati Panigale R	0	Technical problem (Original attempt)	4	
Ret	14	(France) Randy De Puniet	Suzuki GSX-R1000	0	Retirement (Original attempt)	17	
DNS	59	(Italy) Niccolò Canepa	Kawasaki ZX-10R		Did not start		
Report:

=== Race 2 classification ===
Pos	No.	Rider	Bike	Laps	Time	Grid	Points
1	65	(United Kingdom) Jonathan Rea	Kawasaki ZX-10R	19	34:06.825	3	25
2	66	(United Kingdom) Tom Sykes	Kawasaki ZX-10R	19	+4.399	2	20
3	81	(Spain) Jordi Torres	Aprilia RSV4 RF	19	+26.020	6	16
4	34	(Italy) Davide Giugliano	Ducati Panigale R	19	+30.853	1	13
5	86	(Italy) Ayrton Badovini	BMW S1000RR	19	+35.379	8	11
6	15	(Italy) Matteo Baiocco	Ducati Panigale R	19	+38.818	13	10
7	40	(Spain) Román Ramos	Kawasaki ZX-10R	19	+40.663	15	9
8	36	(Argentina) Leandro Mercado	Ducati Panigale R	19	+42.067	7	8
9	84	(Italy) Michel Fabrizio	Ducati Panigale R	19	+55.722	12	7
10	22	(United Kingdom) Alex Lowes	Suzuki GSX-R1000	19	+56.990	10	6
11	51	(Spain) Santiago Barragán	Kawasaki ZX-10R	19	+1:29.613	17	5
12	10	(Hungary) Imre Tóth	BMW S1000RR	18	+1 lap	19	
13	75	(Hungary) Gábor Rizmayer	BMW S1000RR	18	+1 lap	20	
Ret	7	(United Kingdom) Chaz Davies	Ducati Panigale R	14	Technical problem	4	
Ret	91	(United Kingdom) Leon Haslam	Aprilia RSV4 RF	8	Accident	5	
Ret	60	(Netherlands) Michael Van Der Mark	Honda CBR1000RR SP	8	Retirement	9	
Ret	2	(United Kingdom) Leon Camier	MV Agusta 1000 F4	5	Retirement	11	
Ret	14	(United Kingdom) Randy De Puniet	Suzuki GSX-R1000	4	Retirement	16	
Ret	23	(France) Christophe Ponsson	Kawasaki ZX-10R	3	Retirement	18	
Ret	1	(France) Sylvain Guintoli	Honda CBR1000RR SP	0	Accident	14	
DNS	44	(Spain) David Salom	Kawasaki ZX-10R		Did not start		
DNS	59	(Italy) Niccolò Canepa	Kawasaki ZX-10R		Did not start		
Report:

== Supersport ==
=== Race classification ===
Pos	No.	Rider	Bike	Laps	Time	Grid	Points
1	54	(Turkey) Kenan Sofuoğlu	Kawasaki ZX-6R	17	31:38.539	2	25
2	16	(France) Jules Cluzel	MV Agusta F3 675	17	+0.883	1	20
3	87	(Italy) Lorenzo Zanetti	MV Agusta F3 675	17	+9.624	5	16
4	99	(United States) P. J. Jacobsen	Kawasaki ZX-6R	17	+11.116	4	13
5	5	(Italy) Marco Faccani	Kawasaki ZX-6R	17	+14.327	3	11
6	9	(Thailand) Ratthapark Wilairot	Honda CBR600RR	17	+29.276	7	10
7	4	(United Kingdom) Gino Rea	Honda CBR600RR	17	+29.760	6	9
8	84	(Italy) Riccardo Russo	Honda CBR600RR	17	+30.745	8	8
9	36	(Colombia) Martín Cárdenas	Honda CBR600RR	17	+36.262	15	7
10	44	(Italy) Roberto Rolfo	Honda CBR600RR	17	+37.478	12	6
11	11	(Italy) Christian Gamarino	Kawasaki ZX-6R	17	+45.384	14	5
12	61	(Italy) Fabio Menghi	Yamaha YZF-R6	17	+51.933	13	4
13	6	(Switzerland) Dominic Schmitter	Kawasaki ZX-6R	17	+52.148	17	3
14	41	(Australia) Aiden Wagner	Kawasaki ZX-6R	17	+57.711	20	2
15	111	(United Kingdom) Kyle Smith	Honda CBR600RR	17	+1:09.602	10	1
16	74	(United Kingdom) Kieran Clarke	Honda CBR600RR	17	+1:10.242	21	
17	34	(Argentina) Ezequiel Iturrioz	Kawasaki ZX-6R	17	+1:23.720	22	
Ret	10	(Spain) Nacho Calero	Honda CBR600RR	12	Accident	19	
Ret	68	(Australia) Glenn Scott	Honda CBR600RR	11	Technical problem	18	
Ret	25	(Italy) Alex Baldolini	MV Agusta F3 675	8	Retirement	9	
Ret	19	(Germany) Kevin Wahr	Honda CBR600RR	8	Retirement	16	
Ret	14	(France) Lucas Mahias	Kawasaki ZX-6R	4	Retirement	11	
DNS	81	(Italy) Alessandro Nocco	Honda CBR600RR		Did not start		
Report:
