= 2015 Losail Superbike World Championship round =

(Qatar) 2015 Losail Superbike World Championship round
Round details
- Round 13 of 13 rounds in the 2015 Superbike World Championship. and Round 12 of 12 rounds in the 2015 Supersport World Championship.
- Date: 18 October, 2015
- Location: Losail
- Course: Permanent racing facility 5.419 km (3.367 mi)

Superbike World Championship
Pole position
(United Kingdom) Tom Sykes
1:56.821
Fastest lap race 1	Fastest lap race 2
(United Kingdom) Tom Sykes	(United Kingdom) Leon Haslam
1:57.317	1:58.068

Supersport World Championship
Pole position
(Turkey) Kenan Sofuoğlu
2:00.989
Fastest lap
(United Kingdom) Kyle Smith
2:02.122

The 2015 Losail Superbike World Championship round was the thirteenth and final round of the 2015 Superbike World Championship and also the twelfth and final round of the 2015 Supersport World Championship. It took place over the weekend of 16–18 October 2015 at the Lusail International Circuit located in Lusail, Qatar.

== Superbike race ==
=== Race 1 classification ===
Pos	No.	Rider	Bike	Laps	Time	Grid	Points
1	81	(Spain) Jordi Torres	Aprilia RSV4 RF	17	33:40.883	6	25
2	65	(United Kingdom) Jonathan Rea	Kawasaki ZX-10R	17	+0.726	2	20
3	66	(United Kingdom) Tom Sykes	Kawasaki ZX-10R	17	+6.579	1	16
4	7	(United Kingdom) Chaz Davies	Ducati Panigale R	17	+7.889	4	13
5	60	(Netherlands) Michael Van Der Mark	Honda CBR1000RR SP	17	+13.512	9	11
6	91	(United Kingdom) Leon Haslam	Aprilia RSV4 RF	17	+17.755	5	10
7	112	(Spain) Javier Forés	Ducati Panigale R	17	+23.590	3	9
8	44	(Spain) David Salom	Kawasaki ZX-10R	17	+26.417	11	8
9	36	(Argentina) Leandro Mercado	Ducati Panigale R	17	+26.489	10	7
10	1	(France) Sylvain Guintoli	Honda CBR1000RR SP	17	+27.979	12	6
11	86	(Italy) Ayrton Badovini	BMW S1000RR	17	+28.120	14	5
12	14	(France) Randy De Puniet	Suzuki GSX-R1000	17	+34.064	8	4
13	75	(Hungary) Gábor Rizmayer	BMW S1000RR	17	+1:09.123	18	3
14	23	(France) Christophe Ponsson	Kawasaki ZX-10R	17	+1:10.996	21	2
15	45	(Italy) Gianluca Vizziello	Kawasaki ZX-10R	17	+1:13.892	17	1
16	48	(Australia) Alex Phillis	Kawasaki ZX-10R	17	+1:30.797	19	
17	10	(Hungary) Imre Tóth	BMW S1000RR	16	+1 lap	20	
Ret	59	(Italy) Niccolò Canepa	Ducati Panigale R	10	Retirement	13	
Ret	40	(Spain) Román Ramos	Kawasaki ZX-10R	7	Technical problem	16	
Ret	22	(United Kingdom) Alex Lowes	Suzuki GSX-R1000	6	Technical problem	7	
Ret	2	(United Kingdom) Leon Camier	MV Agusta F4 RR	0	Retirement	15	
DNS	15	(Italy) Matteo Baiocco	Ducati Panigale R		Did not start		
Report:

=== Race 2 classification ===
Pos	No.	Rider	Bike	Laps	Time	Grid	Points
1	91	(United Kingdom) Leon Haslam	Aprilia RSV4 RF	17	33:45.745	5	25
2	7	(United Kingdom) Chaz Davies	Ducati Panigale R	17	+0.110	4	20
3	66	(United Kingdom) Tom Sykes	Kawasaki ZX-10R	17	+0.388	1	16
4	60	(Netherlands) Michael Van Der Mark	Honda CBR1000RR SP	17	+7.653	9	13
5	1	(France) Sylvain Guintoli	Honda CBR1000RR SP	17	+14.487	12	11
6	36	(Argentina) Leandro Mercado	Ducati Panigale R	17	+19.363	10	10
7	14	(France) Randy De Puniet	Suzuki GSX-R1000	17	+22.468	8	9
8	59	(Italy) Niccolò Canepa	Ducati Panigale R	17	+22.530	13	8
9	44	(Spain) David Salom	Kawasaki ZX-10R	17	+27.596	11	7
10	86	(Italy) Ayrton Badovini	BMW S1000RR	17	+29.294	14	6
11	23	(France) Christophe Ponsson	Kawasaki ZX-10R	17	+1:02.181	21	5
12	45	(Italy) Gianluca Vizziello	Kawasaki ZX-10R	17	+1:05.246	17	4
13	75	(Hungary) Gábor Rizmayer	BMW S1000RR	17	+1:05.256	18	3
14	10	(Hungary) Imre Tóth	BMW S1000RR	17	+2:04.813	20	2
15	48	(Australia) Alex Phillis	Kawasaki ZX-10R	15	+2 lap	19	1
Ret	40	(Spain) Román Ramos	Kawasaki ZX-10R	16	Technical problem	16	
Ret	81	(Spain) Jordi Torres	Aprilia RSV4 RF	15	Accident	6	
Ret	65	(United Kingdom) Jonathan Rea	Kawasaki ZX-10R	4	Technical problem	2	
Ret	2	(United Kingdom) Leon Camier	MV Agusta F4 RR	4	Retirement	15	
Ret	22	(United Kingdom) Alex Lowes	Suzuki GSX-R1000	0	Retirement	7	
DNS	112	(Spain) Javier Forés	Ducati Panigale R	0	Did not start	3	
DNS	15	(Italy) Matteo Baiocco	Ducati Panigale R		Did not start		
Report:

== Supersport ==
=== Race classification ===
Pos	No.	Rider	Bike	Laps	Time	Grid	Points
1	111	(United Kingdom) Kyle Smith	Honda CBR600RR	15	30:44.036	5	25
2	54	(Turkey) Kenan Sofuoğlu	Kawasaki ZX-6R	15	+0.971	1	20
3	87	(Italy) Lorenzo Zanetti	MV Agusta F3 675	15	+1.074	6	16
4	14	(France) Lucas Mahias	Yamaha YZF-R6	15	+3.575	2	13
5	99	(United States) P. J. Jacobsen	Honda CBR600RR	15	+6.271	4	11
6	88	(Spain) Nicolás Terol	MV Agusta F3 675	15	+6.553	7	10
7	44	(Italy) Roberto Rolfo	Honda CBR600RR	15	+19.988	10	9
8	25	(Italy) Alex Baldolini	MV Agusta F3 675	15	+26.605	12	8
9	5	(Italy) Marco Faccani	Kawasaki ZX-6R	15	+26.901	8	7
10	61	(Italy) Fabio Menghi	Yamaha YZF-R6	15	+37.648	13	6
11	6	(Switzerland) Dominic Schmitter	Kawasaki ZX-6R	15	+37.655	14	5
12	31	(Spain) Sergio Gadea	Honda CBR600RR	15	+1:09.489	17	4
13	10	(Spain) Nacho Calero	Honda CBR600RR	15	+1:11.089	16	3
14	181	(Saudi Arabia) Abdulaziz Binladin	Kawasaki ZX-6R	15	+1:14.627	18	2
15	43	(Italy) Kevin Manfredi	Honda CBR600RR	15	+1:31.901	20	1
16	35	(United Kingdom) Stefan Hill	Honda CBR600RR	14	+1 lap	19	
Ret	11	(Italy) Christian Gamarino	Kawasaki ZX-6R	11	Accident	9	
Ret	19	(Germany) Kevin Wahr	Honda CBR600RR	11	Retirement	11	
Ret	4	(United Kingdom) Gino Rea	Honda CBR600RR	6	Accident	3	
Ret	41	(Australia) Aiden Wagner	Honda CBR600RR	0	Retirement	15	
DNS	68	(Australia) Glenn Scott	Honda CBR600RR		Did not start		
Report:
