= 2015 Buriram Superbike World Championship round =

(Thailand) 2015 Buriram Superbike World Championship round
Round details
- Round 2 of 13 rounds in the 2015 Superbike World Championship. and Round 2 of 12 rounds in the 2015 Supersport World Championship.
- Date: 22 March, 2015
- Location: Buriram
- Course: Permanent racing facility 4.554 km (2.830 mi)

Superbike World Championship
Pole position
(United Kingdom) Jonathan Rea
1:33.382
Fastest lap race 1	Fastest lap race 2
(United Kingdom) Jonathan Rea	(United Kingdom) Jonathan Rea
1:33.969	1:33.817

Supersport World Championship
Pole position
(Turkey) Kenan Sofuoğlu
1:37.345
Fastest lap
(France) Jules Cluzel
1:37.887

The 2015 Buriram Superbike World Championship round was the second round of the 2015 Superbike World Championship and also the 2015 Supersport World Championship. It took place over the weekend of 20–22 March 2015 at the Buriram International Circuit located in Buriram, Thailand. This is the first time ever the Superbike World Championship race in Thailand.

== Superbike race ==
=== Race 1 classification ===
Pos	No.	Rider	Bike	Laps	Time	Grid	Points
1	65	(United Kingdom) Jonathan Rea	Kawasaki ZX-10R	20	31:33.852	1	25
2	91	(United Kingdom) Leon Haslam	Aprilia RSV4 RF	20	+6.329	2	20
3	66	(United Kingdom) Tom Sykes	Kawasaki ZX-10R	20	+8.183	4	16
4	81	(Spain) Jordi Torres	Aprilia RSV4 RF	20	+8.513	5	13
5	1	(France) Sylvain Guintoli	Honda CBR1000RR SP	20	+20.502	9	11
6	15	(Italy) Matteo Baiocco	Ducati Panigale R	20	+26.118	12	10
7	22	(United Kingdom) Alex Lowes	Suzuki GSX-R1000	20	+26.149 (Note: Drop 1 position.)	3	9
8	44	(Spain) David Salom	Kawasaki ZX-10R	20	+27.925	11	8
9	21	(Australia) Troy Bayliss	Ducati Panigale R	20	+28.174 (Note: Drop 1 position.)	7	7
10	36	(Argentina) Leandro Mercado	Ducati Panigale R	20	+32.610	10	6
11	7	(United Kingdom) Chaz Davies	Ducati Panigale R	20	+37.330	6	5
12	18	(Spain) Nicolás Terol	Ducati Panigale R	20	+37.902	14	4
13	14	(France) Randy De Puniet	Suzuki GSX-R1000'	20	+41.722	16	3
14	20	(France) Sylvain Barrier	BMW S1000RR	20	+50.099	13	2
15	40	(Spain) Román Ramos	Kawasaki ZX-10R	20	+59.457	17	1
16	43	(South Africa) Greg Gildenhuys	Kawasaki ZX-10R	20	+1:20.519	22	
17	51	(Spain) Santiago Barragán	Kawasaki ZX-10R	20	+1:20.931	20	
18	10	(Hungary) Imre Tóth	BMW S1000RR	19	+1 lap	24	
19	5	(Poland) Ireneusz Sikora	BMW S1000RR	19	+1 lap	25	
Ret	72	(United States) Larry Pegram	EBR 1190 RX	16	Retirement	23	
Ret	9	(Thailand) Anucha Nakcharoensri	Honda CBR1000RR SP	13	Mechanical	21	
Ret	60	(Netherlands) Michael Van Der Mark	Honda CBR1000RR SP	6	Technical	8	
Ret	23	(France) Christophe Ponsson	Kawasaki ZX-10R	4	Accident	19	
Ret	59	(Italy) Niccolò Canepa	EBR 1190 RX	3	Retirement	18	
Ret	2	(United Kingdom) Leon Camier	MV Agusta 1000 F4	1	Retirement	15	
Ret	53	(Thailand) Chanon Chumjai	BMW S1000RR	0	Technical	26	
Report:

=== Race 2 classification ===
Pos	No.	Rider	Bike	Laps	Time	Grid	Points
1	65	(United Kingdom) Jonathan Rea	Kawasaki ZX-10R	20	31:31.173	1	25
2	91	(United Kingdom) Leon Haslam	Aprilia RSV4 RF	20	+4.946	2	20
3	22	(United Kingdom) Alex Lowes	Suzuki GSX-R1000	20	+8.701	3	16
4	81	(Spain) Jordi Torres	Aprilia RSV4 RF	20	+10.628	5	13
5	66	(United Kingdom) Tom Sykes	Kawasaki ZX-10R	20	+14.326	4	11
6	1	(France) Sylvain Guintoli	Honda CBR1000RR SP	20	+21.060	9	10
7	60	(Netherlands) Michael Van Der Mark	Honda CBR1000RR SP	20	+21.246	8	9
8	15	(Italy) Matteo Baiocco	Ducati Panigale R	20	+23.866	12	8
9	44	(Spain) David Salom	Kawasaki ZX-10R	20	+25.744	11	7
10	36	(Argentina) Leandro Mercado	Ducati Panigale R	20	+29.692	10	6
11	21	(Australia) Troy Bayliss	Ducati Panigale R	20	+34.533	7	5
12	18	(Spain) Nicolás Terol	Ducati Panigale R	20	+38.323	14	4
13	20	(France) Sylvain Barrier	BMW S1000RR	20	+45.834	13	3
14	40	(Spain) Román Ramos	Kawasaki ZX-10R	20	+45.955	17	2
15	7	(United Kingdom) Chaz Davies	Ducati Panigale R	20	+1:00.898	6	1
16	43	(South Africa) Greg Gildenhuys	Kawasaki ZX-10R	20	1:23.943	21	
17	9	(Thailand) Anucha Nakcharoensri	Honda CBR1000RR SP	20	+1:38.125	20	
18	10	(Hungary) Imre Tóth	BMW S1000RR	19	+1 lap	22	
19	5	(Poland) Ireneusz Sikora	BMW S1000RR	19	+1 lap	23	
20	53	(Thailand) Chanon Chumjai	BMW S1000RR	19	+1 lap	24	
Ret	51	(Spain) Santiago Barragán	Kawasaki ZX-10R	13	Retirement	19	
Ret	2	(United Kingdom) Leon Camier	MV Agusta 1000 F4	10	Technical	15	
Ret	14	(France) Randy De Puniet	Suzuki GSX-R1000	5	Technical	16	
Ret	23	(France) Christophe Ponsson	Kawasaki ZX-10R	0	Retirement	18	
DNS	59	(Italy) Niccolò Canepa	EBR 1190 RX		Did not start		
DNS	75	(United States) Larry Pegram	EBR 1190 RX		Did not start		
Report:

== Supersport ==
=== Race classification ===
Pos	No.	Rider	Bike	Laps	Time	Grid	Points
1	14	(Thailand) Ratthapark Wilairot	Honda CBR600RR	17	27:57.523	7	25
2	54	(Turkey) Kenan Sofuoğlu	Kawasaki ZX-6R	17	+1.828	1	20
3	99	(United States) P. J. Jacobsen	Kawasaki ZX-6R	17	+1.860	6	16
4	14	(France) Lucas Mahias	Kawasaki ZX-6R	17	+8.664	5	13
5	59	(Thailand) Ratthapong Wilairot	Honda CBR600RR	17	+12.110	13	11
6	44	(Italy) Roberto Rolfo	Honda CBR600RR	17	+13.599	8	10
7	5	(Italy) Marco Faccani	Kawasaki ZX-6R	17	+14.025	11	9
8	36	(Colombia) Martín Cárdenas	Honda CBR600RR	17	+14.857	12	8
9	25	(Italy) Alex Baldolini	MV Agusta F3 675	17	+21.690	15	7
10	4	(United Kingdom) Gino Rea	Honda CBR600RR	17	+30.238	9	6
11	30	(Thailand) Decha Kraisart	Yamaha YZF-R6	17	+30.639	16	5
12	19	(Germany) Kevin Wahr	Honda CBR600RR	17	+36.167	20	4
13	11	(Italy) Christian Gamarino	Kawasaki ZX-6R	17	+36.337	18	3
14	68	(Australia) Glenn Scott	Honda CBR600RR	17	+36.670	22	2
15	6	(Switzerland) Dominic Schmitter	Kawasaki ZX-6R	17	+37.587	10	1
16	27	(Thailand) Thitipong Warokorn	Honda CBR600RR	17	+38.746	19	
Ret	16	(France) Jules Cluzel	MV Agusta F3 675	14	Retirement	2	
Ret	111	(United Kingdom) Kyle Smith	Honda CBR600RR	8	Accident	3	
Ret	87	(Italy) Lorenzo Zanetti	MV Agusta F3 675	8	Retirement	4	
Ret	74	(United Kingdom) Kieran Clarke	Honda CBR600RR	6	Technical	21	
Ret	84	(Italy) Riccardo Russo	Honda CBR600RR	6	Retirement	23	
Ret	65	(Thailand) Chalermpol Polamai	Yamaha YZF-R6	5	Technical	17	
Ret	61	(Italy) Fabio Menghi	Yamaha YZF-R6	0	Accident	14	
DNS	81	(Italy) Alessandro Nocco	Honda CBR600RR		Did not start		
Report:
