= 2015 Misano Superbike World Championship round =

2015 Superbike world championship

(Italy) 2015 Misano Superbike World Championship round
Round details
- Round 8 of 13 rounds in the 2015 Superbike World Championship. and Round 8 of 12 rounds in the 2015 Supersport World Championship.
- Date: 21 June, 2015
- Location: Misano
- Course: Permanent racing facility 4.226 km (2.626 mi)

Superbike World Championship
Pole position
(United Kingdom) Tom Sykes
1:34.214
Fastest lap race 1	Fastest lap race 2
(Italy) Davide Giugliano	(United Kingdom) Jonathan Rea
1:34.855	1:34.720

Supersport World Championship
Pole position
(France) Jules Cluzel
1:37.482
Fastest lap
(France) Jules Cluzel
1:38.239

The 2015 Misano Superbike World Championship round was the eighth round of the 2015 Superbike World Championship and also the 2015 Supersport World Championship. It took place over the weekend of 19–21 June 2015 at the Misano World Circuit Marco Simoncelli located in Misano Adriatico, Italy. This race saw a returned for two times WSBK champion Max Biaggi since retiring at the end of the 2012 Magny-Cours Superbike World Championship round where he won his second and last title.

== Superbike race ==
=== Race 1 classification ===
Pos	No.	Rider	Bike	Laps	Time	Grid	Points
1	66	(United Kingdom) Tom Sykes	Kawasaki ZX-10R	21	33:30.813	1	25
2	65	(United Kingdom) Jonathan Rea	Kawasaki ZX-10R	21	+3.613	4	20
3	7	(United Kingdom) Chaz Davies	Ducati Panigale R	21	+4.178	11	16
4	34	(Italy) Davide Giugliano	Ducati Panigale R	21	+5.944	3	13
5	91	(United Kingdom) Leon Haslam	Aprilia RSV4 RF	21	+12.155	2	11
6	3	(Italy) Max Biaggi	Aprilia RSV4 RF	21	+12.352	5	10
7	86	(Italy) Ayrton Badovini	BMW S1000RR	21	+18.145	8	9
8	55	(Italy) Michele Pirro	Ducati Panigale R	21	+18.328	10	8
9	1	(France) Sylvain Guintoli	Honda CBR1000RR SP	21	+20.088	9	7
10	60	(Netherlands) Michael Van Der Mark	Honda CBR1000RR SP	21	+20.282	15	6
11	36	(Argentina) Leandro Mercado	Ducati Panigale R	21	+24.195	13	5
12	22	(United Kingdom) Alex Lowes	Suzuki GSX-R1000	21	+26.625	7	4
13	2	(United Kingdom) Leon Camier	MV Agusta 1000 F4	21	+26.719	18	3
14	40	(Spain) Román Ramos	Kawasaki ZX-10R	21	+31.898	17	2
15	15	(Italy) Matteo Baiocco	Ducati Panigale R	21	+32.643	12	1
16	11	(Germany) Markus Reiterberger	BMW S1000RR	21	+36.833	16	
17	44	(Spain) David Salom	Kawasaki ZX-10R	21	+42.514	20	
18	23	(France) Christophe Ponsson	Kawasaki ZX-10R	21	+1:10.247	23	
19	51	(Spain) Santiago Barragán	Kawasaki ZX-10R	21	+1:10.536	21	
20	45	(Italy) Gianluca Vizziello	Kawasaki ZX-10R	21	+1:28.191	22	
21	75	(Hungary) Gábor Rizmayer	BMW S1000RR	21	+1:38.856	24	
22	10	(Hungary) Imre Tóth	BMW S1000RR	20	+1 lap	25	
Ret	59	(Italy) Niccolò Canepa	Ducati Panigale R	14	Retirement	14	
Ret	14	(France) Randy De Puniet	Suzuki GSX-R1000	10	Retirement	19	
Ret	81	(Spain) Jordi Torres	Aprilia RSV4 RF	2	Accident	6	
Report:

=== Race 2 classification ===
Pos	No.	Rider	Bike	Laps	Time	Grid	Points
1	65	(United Kingdom) Jonathan Rea	Kawasaki ZX-10R	21	33:31.716	4	25
2	66	(Italy) Davide Giugliano	Ducati Panigale R	21	+1.290	3	20
3	91	(United Kingdom) Leon Haslam	Aprilia RSV4 RF	21	+2.436	2	16
4	7	(United Kingdom) Chaz Davies	Ducati Panigale R	21	+2.514	11	13
5	66	(United Kingdom) Tom Sykes	Kawasaki ZX-10R	21	+5.694	1	11
6	3	(Italy) Max Biaggi	Aprilia RSV4 RF	21	+5.911	5	10
7	81	(Spain) Jordi Torres	Aprilia RSV4 RF	21	+7.075	6	9
8	55	(Italy) Michele Pirro	Ducati Panigale R	21	+10.159	10	8
9	1	(France) Sylvain Guintoli	Honda CBR1000RR SP	21	+17.476	9	7
10	60	(Netherlands) Michael Van Der Mark	Honda CBR1000RR SP	21	+17.589	15	6
11	86	(Italy) Ayrton Badovini	BMW S1000RR	21	+21.744	8	5
12	59	(Italy) Niccolò Canepa	Ducati Panigale R	21	+26.599	14	4
13	11	(Germany) Markus Reiterberger	BMW S1000RR	21	+30.402	16	3
14	40	(Spain) Román Ramos	Kawasaki ZX-10R	21	+36.000	17	2
15	44	(Spain) David Salom	Kawasaki ZX-10R	21	+36.186	20	1
16	2	(United Kingdom) Leon Camier	MV Agusta 1000 F4	21	+37.572	18	
17	14	(France) Randy De Puniet	Suzuki GSX-R1000	21	+55.983	19	
18	23	(France) Christophe Ponsson	Kawasaki ZX-10R	21	+1:10.593	23	
19	45	(Italy) Gianluca Vizziello	Kawasaki ZX-10R	21	+1:16.119	22	
20	51	(Spain) Santiago Barragán	Kawasaki ZX-10R	21	+1:16.177	21	
21	75	(Hungary) Gábor Rizmayer	BMW S1000RR	21	+1:31.041	24	
22	10	(Hungary) Imre Tóth	BMW S1000RR	19	+2 lap	25	
Ret	15	(Italy) Matteo Baiocco	Ducati Panigale R	15	Retirement	12	
Ret	22	(United Kingdom) Alex Lowes	Suzuki GSX-R1000	8	Retirement	7	
Ret	36	(Argentina) Leandro Mercado	Ducati Panigale R	3	Technical problem	13	
Report:

== Supersport ==
=== Race classification ===
Pos	No.	Rider	Bike	Laps	Time	Grid	Points
1	16	(France) Jules Cluzel	MV Agusta F3 675	19	31:19.621	1	25
2	99	(United States) P. J. Jacobsen	Honda CBR600RR	19	+1.525	3	20
3	87	(Italy) Lorenzo Zanetti	MV Agusta F3 675	19	+8.513	4	16
4	4	(United Kingdom) Gino Rea	Honda CBR600RR	19	+23.153	5	13
5	25	(Italy) Alex Baldolini	MV Agusta F3 675	19	+23.846	7	11
6	61	(Italy) Fabio Menghi	Yamaha YZF-R6	19	+23.851	6	10
7	11	(Italy) Christian Gamarino	Kawasaki ZX-6R	19	+23.978	9	9
8	84	(Italy) Riccardo Russo	Honda CBR600RR	19	+24.691	13	8
9	5	(Italy) Marco Faccani	Kawasaki ZX-6R	19	+25.068	12	7
10	36	(Colombia) Martín Cárdenas	Honda CBR600RR	19	+25.279	14	6
11	54	(Turkey) Kenan Sofuoğlu	Kawasaki ZX-6R	19	+29.501	2	5
12	44	(Italy) Roberto Rolfo	Honda CBR600RR	19	+29.712	8	4
13	6	(Switzerland) Dominic Schmitter	Kawasaki ZX-6R	19	+39.947	17	3
14	19	(Germany) Kevin Wahr	Honda CBR600RR	19	+40.082	10	2
15	68	(Australia) Glenn Scott	Honda CBR600RR	19	+40.362	15	1
16	92	(Hungary) Dávid Juhász	Honda CBR600RR	19	+56.799	19	
17	10	(Spain) Nacho Calero	Honda CBR600RR	19	+1:05.567	21	
18	43	(Italy) Kevin Manfredi	Honda CBR600RR	19	+1:05.814	20	
19	33	(Italy) Flavio Ferroni	Kawasaki ZX-6R	19	+1:14.385	23	
Ret	161	(Russia) Alexey Ivanov	Yamaha YZF-R6	18	Technical problem	16	
Ret	119	(Hungary) János Chrobák	Honda CBR600RR	8	Accident	22	
Ret	24	(Spain) Marcos Ramírez	Honda CBR600RR	8	Accident	18	
Ret	111	(United Kingdom) Kyle Smith	Honda CBR600RR	0	Retirement	11	
Report:
