= 2015 Magny-Cours Superbike World Championship round =

2015 Superbike world championship

(France) 2015 Magny-Cours Superbike World Championship round
Round details
- Round 12 of 13 rounds in the 2015 Superbike World Championship. and Round 11 of 12 rounds in the 2015 Supersport World Championship.
- Date: 4 October, 2015
- Location: Mangy-Cours
- Course: Permanent racing facility 4.411 km (2.741 mi)

Superbike World Championship
Pole position
(United Kingdom) Leon Haslam
1:56.404
| Fastest lap race 1 | Fastest lap race 2 |
| (United Kingdom) Jonathan Rea | (United Kingdom) Jonathan Rea |
| 1:53.247 | 1:38.500 |

Supersport World Championship
Pole position
(United States) P. J. Jacobsen
2:00.197
Fastest lap
(United States) P. J. Jacobsen
1:43.569

The 2015 Magny-Cours Superbike World Championship round was the twelfth round of the 2015 Superbike World Championship and also the eleventh round of the 2015 Supersport World Championship. It took place over the weekend of 2–4 October 2015 at the Circuit de Nevers Magny-Cours located in Magny-Cours, France.

== Superbike race ==
=== Race 1 classification ===
| Pos | No. | Rider | Bike | Laps | Time | Grid | Points |
|---|---|---|---|---|---|---|---|
| 1 | 65 | (United Kingdom) Jonathan Rea | Kawasaki ZX-10R | 19 | 36:29.856 | 2 | 25 |
| 2 | 66 | (United Kingdom) Tom Sykes | Kawasaki ZX-10R | 19 | +4.711 | 9 | 20 |
| 3 | 1 | (France) Sylvain Guintoli | Honda CBR1000RR SP | 19 | +14.683 | 5 | 16 |
| 4 | 60 | (Netherlands) Michael Van Der Mark | Honda CBR1000RR SP | 19 | +22.772 | 15 | 13 |
| 5 | 2 | (United Kingdom) Leon Camier | MV Agusta F4 RR | 19 | +30.136 | 7 | 11 |
| 6 | 7 | (United Kingdom) Chaz Davies | Ducati Panigale R | 19 | +31.528 | 4 | 10 |
| 7 | 15 | (Italy) Matteo Baiocco | Ducati Panigale R | 19 | +32.129 | 13 | 9 |
| 8 | 22 | (United Kingdom) Alex Lowes | Suzuki GSX-R1000 | 19 | +39.034 | 11 | 8 |
| 9 | 36 | (Argentina) Leandro Mercado | Ducati Panigale R | 19 | +1:01.396 | 14 | 7 |
| 10 | 59 | (Italy) Niccolò Canepa | Ducati Panigale R | 19 | +1:07.845 | 3 | 6 |
| 11 | 45 | (Italy) Gianluca Vizziello | Kawasaki ZX-10R | 19 | +1:09.622 | 17 | 5 |
| 12 | 81 | (Spain) Jordi Torres | Aprilia RSV4 RF | 19 | +1:16.782 | 12 | 4 |
| 13 | 99 | (Italy) Luca Scassa | Ducati Panigale R | 19 | +1:19.531 | 6 | 3 |
| 14 | 86 | (Italy) Ayrton Badovini | BMW S1000RR | 19 | +1:26.459 | 8 | 2 |
| 15 | 40 | (Spain) Román Ramos | Kawasaki ZX-10R | 19 | +1:30.260 | 18 | 1 |
| 16 | 75 | (Hungary) Gábor Rizmayer | BMW S1000RR | 18 | +1 lap | 22 | |
| 18 | 23 | (France) Christophe Ponsson | Kawasaki ZX-10R | 18 | +1 lap | 21 | |
| 19 | 48 | (Australia) Alex Phillis | Kawasaki ZX-10R | 18 | +1 lap | 23 | |
| 20 | 10 | (Hungary) Imre Tóth | BMW S1000RR | 18 | +1 lap | 24 | |
| 21 | 11 | (Germany) Markus Reiterberger | BMW S1000RR | 17 | +2 lap | 10 | |
| Ret | 19 | (Poland) Paweł Szkopek | Yamaha YZF-R1 | 14 | Retirement | 16 | |
| Ret | 14 | (France) Randy De Puniet | Suzuki GSX-R1000 | 10 | Retirement | 19 | |
| Ret | 44 | (Spain) David Salom | Kawasaki ZX-10R | 5 | Retirement | 20 | |
Report:

=== Race 2 classification ===
| Pos | No. | Rider | Bike | Laps | Time | Grid | Points |
|---|---|---|---|---|---|---|---|
| 1 | 65 | (United Kingdom) Jonathan Rea | Kawasaki ZX-10R | 21 | 34:40.147 | 2 | 25 |
| 2 | 7 | (United Kingdom) Chaz Davies | Ducati Panigale R | 21 | +2.848 | 4 | 20 |
| 3 | 66 | (United Kingdom) Tom Sykes | Kawasaki ZX-10R | 21 | +6.551 | 9 | 16 |
| 4 | 60 | (Netherlands) Michael Van Der Mark | Honda CBR1000RR SP | 21 | +10.202 | 15 | 13 |
| 5 | 91 | (United Kingdom) Leon Haslam | Aprilia RSV4 RF | 21 | +12.921 | 1 | 11 |
| 6 | 1 | (France) Sylvain Guintoli | Honda CBR1000RR SP | 21 | +19.885 | 5 | 10 |
| 7 | 59 | (Italy) Niccolò Canepa | Ducati Panigale R | 21 | +24.248 | 3 | 9 |
| 8 | 81 | (Spain) Jordi Torres | Aprilia RSV4 RF | 21 | +27.248 | 12 | 8 |
| 9 | 99 | (Italy) Luca Scassa | Ducati Panigale R | 21 | +29.220 | 6 | 7 |
| 10 | 22 | (United Kingdom) Alex Lowes | Suzuki GSX-R1000 | 21 | +32.799 | 11 | 6 |
| 11 | 15 | (Italy) Matteo Baiocco | Ducati Panigale R | 21 | +37.183 | 13 | 5 |
| 12 | 36 | (Argentina) Leandro Mercado | Ducati Panigale R | 21 | +37.347 | 14 | 4 |
| 13 | 11 | (Germany) Markus Reiterberger | BMW S1000RR | 21 | +43.676 | 10 | 3 |
| 14 | 44 | (Spain) David Salom | Kawasaki ZX-10R | 21 | +45.943 | 20 | 2 |
| 15 | 2 | (United Kingdom) Leon Camier | MV Agusta F4 RR | 21 | +47.982 | 7 | 1 |
| 16 | 40 | (Spain) Román Ramos | Kawasaki ZX-10R | 21 | +59.663 | 18 | |
| 17 | 45 | (Italy) Gianluca Vizziello | Kawasaki ZX-10R | 21 | +1:15.160 | 17 | |
| 18 | 14 | (France) Randy De Puniet | Suzuki GSX-R1000 | 21 | +1:15.533 | 19 | |
| 19 | 23 | (France) Christophe Ponsson | Kawasaki ZX-10R | 21 | +1:35.502 | 21 | |
| 20 | 75 | (Hungary) Gábor Rizmayer | BMW S1000RR | 20 | +1 lap | 22 | |
| 21 | 10 | (Hungary) Imre Tóth | BMW S1000RR | 20 | +1 lap | 24 | |
| 22 | 48 | (Australia) Alex Phillis | Kawasaki ZX-10R | 19 | +2 lap | 23 | |
| Ret | 86 | (Italy) Ayrton Badovini | BMW S1000RR | 10 | Accident | 8 | |
| Ret | 19 | (Poland) Paweł Szkopek | Yamaha YZF-R1 | 9 | Retirement | 16 | |
Report:

== Supersport ==
=== Race classification ===
The race was stopped after 3 laps due to Kevin Manfredi's Honda CBR600RR leaking oil at the track, the race was later restarted and shortened to 11 laps from the original 19 laps.

| Pos | No. | Rider | Bike | Laps | Time | Grid | Points |
|---|---|---|---|---|---|---|---|
| 1 | 99 | (United States) P. J. Jacobsen | Honda CBR600RR | 11 | 19:14.983 | 1 | 25 |
| 2 | 54 | (Turkey) Kenan Sofuoğlu | Kawasaki ZX-6R | 11 | +3.910 | 2 | 20 |
| 3 | 14 | (France) Lucas Mahias | Yamaha YZF-R6 | 11 | +8.950 | 3 | 16 |
| 4 | 87 | (Italy) Lorenzo Zanetti | MV Agusta F3 675 | 11 | +22.021 | 7 | 13 |
| 5 | 111 | (United Kingdom) Kyle Smith | Honda CBR600RR | 11 | +22.958 | 4 | 11 |
| 6 | 19 | (Germany) Kevin Wahr | Honda CBR600RR | 11 | +34.701 | 12 | 10 |
| 7 | 4 | (United Kingdom) Gino Rea | Honda CBR600RR | 11 | +43.995 | 6 | 9 |
| 8 | 36 | (Colombia) Martín Cárdenas | Honda CBR600RR | 11 | +47.585 | 8 | 8 |
| 9 | 11 | (Italy) Christian Gamarino | Kawasaki ZX-6R | 11 | +50.960 | 15 | 7 |
| 10 | 5 | (Italy) Marco Faccani | Kawasaki ZX-6R | 11 | +53.776 | 22 | 6 |
| 11 | 44 | (Italy) Roberto Rolfo | Honda CBR600RR | 11 | +57.270 | 23 | 5 |
| 12 | 6 | (Switzerland) Dominic Schmitter | Kawasaki ZX-6R | 11 | +58.853 | 16 | 4 |
| 13 | 41 | (Australia) Aiden Wagner | Honda CBR600RR | 11 | +1:03.220 | 10 | 3 |
| 14 | 88 | (Spain) Nicolás Terol | MV Agusta F3 675 | 11 | +1:06.865 | 20 | 2 |
| 15 | 96 | (Spain) Xavier Pinsach | Honda CBR600RR | 11 | +1:08.847 | 17 | 1 |
| 16 | 23 | (France) Cédric Tangre | Suzuki GSX-R600 | 11 | +1:15.350 | 11 | |
| 17 | 119 | (Hungary) János Chrobák | Honda CBR600RR | 11 | +1:24.786 | 13 | |
| 18 | 92 | (Hungary) Dávid Juhász | Honda CBR600RR | 11 | +1:24.904 | 18 | |
| 19 | 68 | (Australia) Glenn Scott | Honda CBR600RR | 11 | +1:25.498 | 24 | |
| 20 | 61 | (Italy) Fabio Menghi | Yamaha YZF-R6 | 11 | +1:39.934 | 14 | |
| 21 | 38 | (Estonia) Hannes Soomer | Yamaha YZF-R6 | 11 | +1:42.544 | 19 | |
| 22 | 10 | (Spain) Nacho Calero | Honda CBR600RR | 10 | +1 lap | 21 | |
| DNS | 25 | (Italy) Alex Baldolini | MV Agusta F3 675 | 0 | Technical problem (First attempt) | 5 | |
| DNS | 43 | (Italy) Kevin Manfredi | Honda CBR600RR | 0 | Technical problem (First attempt) | 9 | |
Report:
