= 2015 Portimão Superbike World Championship round =

(Portugal) 2015 Portimão Superbike World Championship round
Round details
- Round 7 of 13 rounds in the 2015 Superbike World Championship. and Round 7 of 12 rounds in the 2015 Supersport World Championship.
- Date: 7 June, 2015
- Location: Portimão
- Course: Permanent racing facility 4.592 km (2.853 mi)

Superbike World Championship
Pole position
(Italy) Davide Giugliano
1:41.764
Fastest lap race 1	Fastest lap race 2
(United Kingdom) Jonathan Rea	(United Kingdom) Jonathan Rea
1:42.637	1:43.034

Supersport World Championship
Pole position
(France) Jules Cluzel
1:44.554
Fastest lap
(Turkey) Kenan Sofuoğlu
1:45.411

The 2015 Portimão Superbike World Championship round was the seventh round of the 2015 Superbike World Championship and also the 2015 Supersport World Championship. It took place over the weekend of 5–7 June 2015 at the Algarve International Circuit located in Portimão, Portugal.

== Superbike race ==
=== Race 1 classification ===
Pos	No.	Rider	Bike	Laps	Time	Grid	Points
1	65	(United Kingdom) Jonathan Rea	Kawasaki ZX-10R	20	37:10.092	8	25
2	66	(United Kingdom) Tom Sykes	Kawasaki ZX-10R	20	+9.384	2	20
3	7	(United Kingdom) Chaz Davies	Ducati Panigale R	20	+13.753	3	16
4	34	(Italy) Davide Giugliano	Ducati Panigale R	20	+27.818	1	13
5	1	(France) Sylvain Guintoli	Honda CBR1000RR SP	20	+28.141	7	11
6	15	(Italy) Matteo Baiocco	Ducati Panigale R	20	+39.665	6	10
7	86	(Italy) Ayrton Badovini	BMW S1000RR	20	+40.829	10	9
8	36	(Argentina) Leandro Mercado	Ducati Panigale R	20	+43.401	11	8
9	60	(Netherlands) Michael Van Der Mark	Honda CBR1000RR SP	20	+59.025	13	7
10	22	(United Kingdom) Alex Lowes	Suzuki GSX-R1000	20	+1:01.388	4	6
11	81	(Spain) Jordi Torres	Aprilia RSV4 RF	20	+1:02.769	9	5
12	91	(United Kingdom) Leon Haslam	Aprilia RSV4 RF	20	+1:04.152	5	4
13	14	(France) Randy De Puniet	Suzuki GSX-R1000	20	+1:39.537	16	3
14	44	(Spain) David Salom	Kawasaki ZX-10R	20	+1:43.681	12	2
15	18	(Spain) Nicolás Terol	Ducati Panigale R	20	+1:45.940	17	1
16	40	(Spain) Román Ramos	Kawasaki ZX-10R	20	+1:49.326	15	
17	59	(Italy) Niccolò Canepa	Kawasaki ZX-10R	19	+1 lap	20	
18	23	(France) Christophe Ponsson	Kawasaki ZX-10R	19	+1 lap	18	
19	75	(Hungary) Gábor Rizmayer	BMW S1000RR	19	+1 lap	21	
20	10	(Hungary) Imre Tóth	BMW S1000RR	15	+5 lap	22	
Ret	51	(Spain) Santiago Barragán	Kawasaki ZX-10R	15	Accident	19	
Ret	2	(United Kingdom) Leon Camier	MV Agusta 1000 F4	2	Retirement	14	
Report:

=== Race 2 classification ===
Pos	No.	Rider	Bike	Laps	Time	Grid	Points
1	65	(United Kingdom) Jonathan Rea	Kawasaki ZX-10R	20	34:33.783	8	25
2	34	(Italy) Davide Giugliano	Ducati Panigale R	20	+5.416	1	20
3	91	(United Kingdom) Leon Haslam	Aprilia RSV4 RF	20	+6.689	5	16
4	7	(United Kingdom) Chaz Davies	Ducati Panigale R	20	+10.445	3	13
5	60	(Netherlands) Michael Van Der Mark	Honda CBR1000RR SP	20	+14.122	13	11
6	1	(France) Sylvain Guintoli	Honda CBR1000RR SP	20	+14.265	7	10
7	81	(Spain) Jordi Torres	Aprilia RSV4 RF	20	+16.213	9	9
8	66	(United Kingdom) Tom Sykes	Kawasaki ZX-10R	20	+19.384	2	8
9	36	(Argentina) Leandro Mercado	Ducati Panigale R	20	+19.998	11	7
10	15	(Italy) Matteo Baiocco	Ducati Panigale R	20	+27.332	6	6
11	40	(Spain) Román Ramos	Kawasaki ZX-10R	20	+28.904	15	5
12	86	(Italy) Ayrton Badovini	BMW S1000RR	20	+31.138	10	4
13	22	(United Kingdom) Alex Lowes	Suzuki GSX-R1000	20	+34.252	4	3
14	23	(France) Christophe Ponsson	Kawasaki ZX-10R	20	+56.181	18	2
15	18	(Spain) Nicolás Terol	Ducati Panigale R	20	+1:02.679	17	1
16	14	(France) Randy De Puniet	Suzuki GSX-R1000	20	+1:03.200	16	
17	59	(Italy) Niccolò Canepa	Kawasaki ZX-10R	20	+1:03.488	20	
18	75	(Hungary) Gábor Rizmayer	BMW S1000RR	19	+1 lap	21	
19	10	(Hungary) Imre Tóth	BMW S1000RR	19	+1 lap	22	
Ret	51	(Spain) Santiago Barragán	Kawasaki ZX-10R	8	Retirement	19	
Ret	44	(Spain) David Salom	Kawasaki ZX-10R	4	Retirement	12	
Ret	2	(United Kingdom) Leon Camier	MV Agusta 1000 F4	1	Technical problem	14	
Report:

== Supersport ==
=== Race classification ===
Pos	No.	Rider	Bike	Laps	Time	Grid	Points
1	16	(France) Jules Cluzel	MV Agusta F3 675	18	31:54.954	1	25
2	54	(Turkey) Kenan Sofuoğlu	Kawasaki ZX-6R	18	+0.184	2	20
3	99	(United States) P. J. Jacobsen	Honda CBR600RR	18	+7.597	3	16
4	4	(United Kingdom) Gino Rea	Honda CBR600RR	18	+8.369	5	13
5	87	(Italy) Lorenzo Zanetti	MV Agusta F3 675	18	+12.451	8	11
6	111	(United Kingdom) Kyle Smith	Honda CBR600RR	18	+13.059	4	10
7	11	(Italy) Christian Gamarino	Kawasaki ZX-6R	18	+19.976	13	9
8	44	(Italy) Roberto Rolfo	Honda CBR600RR	18	+20.355	9	8
9	36	(Colombia) Martín Cárdenas	Honda CBR600RR	18	+32.141	10	7
10	61	(Italy) Fabio Menghi	Yamaha YZF-R6	18	+35.078	7	6
11	24	(Spain) Marcos Ramírez	Honda CBR600RR	18	+35.089	17	5
12	5	(Italy) Marco Faccani	Kawasaki ZX-6R	18	+35.295	12	4
13	68	(Australia) Glenn Scott	Honda CBR600RR	18	+36.058	14	3
14	6	(Switzerland) Dominic Schmitter	Kawasaki ZX-6R	18	+59.859	16	2
15	117	(Portugal) Miguel Praia	Honda CBR600RR	18	+1:02.567	18	1
16	10	(Spain) Nacho Calero	Honda CBR600RR	18	+1:18.363	19	
Ret	25	(Italy) Alex Baldolini	MV Agusta F3 675	10	Technical problem	6	
Ret	19	(Germany) Kevin Wahr	Honda CBR600RR	2	Accident	15	
Ret	84	(Italy) Riccardo Russo	Honda CBR600RR	2	Accident	11	
DNQ	34	(Argentina) Ezequiel Iturrioz	Kawasaki ZX-6R		Did not qualify		
Report:
