= 2015 Jerez Superbike World Championship round =

2015 Superbike world championship

(Spain) 2015 Jerez Superbike World Championship round
Round details
- Round 11 of 13 rounds in the 2015 Superbike World Championship. and Round 10 of 12 rounds in the 2015 Supersport World Championship.
- Date: 20 September, 2015
- Location: Jerez
- Course: Permanent racing facility 4.423 km (2.748 mi)

Superbike World Championship
Pole position
(United Kingdom) Tom Sykes
1:40.292
Fastest lap race 1	Fastest lap race 2
(United Kingdom) Jonathan Rea	(United Kingdom) Tom Sykes
1:41.136	1:42.238

Supersport World Championship
Pole position
(Turkey) Kenan Sofuoğlu
1:43.528
Fastest lap
(United States) P. J. Jacobsen
1:44.177

The 2015 Jerez Superbike World Championship round was the eleventh round of the 2015 Superbike World Championship and also the tenth round of the 2015 Supersport World Championship. It took place over the weekend of 18–20 September 2015 at the Circuito de Jerez located in Jerez de la Frontera, Spain.

== Superbike race ==
=== Race 1 classification ===
Pos	No.	Rider	Bike	Laps	Time	Grid	Points
1	66	(United Kingdom) Tom Sykes	Kawasaki ZX-10R	20	34:14.685	1	25
2	7	(United Kingdom) Chaz Davies	Ducati Panigale R	20	+2.865	6	20
3	60	(Netherlands) Michael Van Der Mark	Honda CBR1000RR SP	20	+6.665	4	16
4	65	(United Kingdom) Jonathan Rea	Kawasaki ZX-10R	20	+9.059	2	13
5	91	(United Kingdom) Leon Haslam	Aprilia RSV4 RF	20	+9.318	11	11
6	55	(Italy) Michele Pirro	Ducati Panigale R	20	+10.466	7	10
7	22	(United Kingdom) Alex Lowes	Suzuki GSX-R1000	20	+15.945	9	9
8	15	(Italy) Matteo Baiocco	Ducati Panigale R	20	+18.020	8	8
9	2	(United Kingdom) Leon Camier	MV Agusta F4 RR	20	+18.654	13	7
10	1	(France) Sylvain Guintoli	Honda CBR1000RR SP	20	+19.510	10	6
11	44	(Spain) David Salom	Kawasaki ZX-10R	20	+24.441	12	5
12	81	(Spain) Jordi Torres	Aprilia RSV4 RF	20	+29.247	5	4
13	40	(Spain) Román Ramos	Kawasaki ZX-10R	20	+35.768	16	3
14	36	(Argentina) Leandro Mercado	Ducati Panigale R	20	+37.933	14	2
15	86	(Italy) Ayrton Badovini	BMW S1000RR	20	+40.147	17	1
16	14	(France) Randy De Puniet	Suzuki GSX-R1000	20	+40.275	15	
17	59	(Italy) Niccolò Canepa	Ducati Panigale R	20	+45.846	3	
18	75	(Hungary) Gábor Rizmayer	BMW S1000RR	20	+1:15.451	20	
19	48	(Australia) Alex Phillis	Kawasaki ZX-10R	19	+1 lap	22	
20	10	(Hungary) Imre Tóth	BMW S1000RR	19	+1 lap	21	
21	23	(France) Christophe Ponsson	Kawasaki ZX-10R	17	+3 lap	18	
22	45	(Italy) Gianluca Vizziello	Kawasaki ZX-10R	17	+3 lap	19	
Report:

=== Race 2 classification ===
Pos	No.	Rider	Bike	Laps	Time	Grid	Points
1	7	(United Kingdom) Chaz Davies	Ducati Panigale R	20	34:29.546	6	25
2	81	(Spain) Jordi Torres	Aprilia RSV4 RF	20	+1.840	5	20
3	91	(United Kingdom) Leon Haslam	Aprilia RSV4 RF	20	+2.335	11	16
4	65	(United Kingdom) Jonathan Rea	Kawasaki ZX-10R	20	+7.619	2	13
5	66	(United Kingdom) Tom Sykes	Kawasaki ZX-10R	20	+11.500	1	11
6	15	(Italy) Matteo Baiocco	Ducati Panigale R	20	+12.705	8	10
7	55	(Italy) Michele Pirro	Ducati Panigale R	20	+12.995	7	9
8	2	(United Kingdom) Leon Camier	MV Agusta F4 RR	20	+15.332	13	8
9	1	(France) Sylvain Guintoli	Honda CBR1000RR SP	20	+18.411	10	7
10	36	(Argentina) Leandro Mercado	Ducati Panigale R	20	+21.544	14	6
11	59	(Italy) Niccolò Canepa	Ducati Panigale R	20	+23.448	3	5
12	44	(Spain) David Salom	Kawasaki ZX-10R	20	+27.790	12	4
13	60	(Netherlands) Michael Van Der Mark	Honda CBR1000RR SP	20	+31.948	4	3
14	86	(Italy) Ayrton Badovini	BMW S1000RR	20	+33.001	17	2
15	23	(France) Christophe Ponsson	Kawasaki ZX-10R	20	+55.363	18	1
16	75	(Hungary) Gábor Rizmayer	BMW S1000RR	20	+1:09.045	20	
17	45	(Italy) Gianluca Vizziello	Kawasaki ZX-10R	20	+1:24.797	19	
18	22	(United Kingdom) Alex Lowes	Suzuki GSX-R1000	20	+1:37.110	9	
19	48	(Australia) Alex Phillis	Kawasaki ZX-10R	20	+1:42.754	22	
20	10	(Hungary) Imre Tóth	BMW S1000RR	20	+1:43.004	21	
Ret	40	(Spain) Román Ramos	Kawasaki ZX-10R	19	Technical problem	16	
Ret	14	(France) Randy De Puniet	Suzuki GSX-R1000	5	Technical problem	15	
Report:

== Supersport ==
=== Race classification ===
Pos	No.	Rider	Bike	Laps	Time	Grid	Points
1	54	(Turkey) Kenan Sofuoğlu	Kawasaki ZX-6R	19	33:17.651	1	25
2	99	(United States) P. J. Jacobsen	Honda CBR600RR	19	+1.037	3	20
3	87	(Italy) Lorenzo Zanetti	MV Agusta F3 675	19	+2.020	2	16
4	111	(United Kingdom) Kyle Smith	Honda CBR600RR	19	+3.561	5	13
5	88	(Spain) Nicolás Terol	MV Agusta F3 675	19	+7.777	11	11
6	5	(Italy) Marco Faccani	Kawasaki ZX-6R	19	+11.391	4	10
7	25	(Italy) Alex Baldolini	MV Agusta F3 675	19	+16.822	9	9
8	11	(Italy) Christian Gamarino	Kawasaki ZX-6R	19	+28.339	13	8
9	19	(Germany) Kevin Wahr	Honda CBR600RR	19	+29.997	16	7
10	44	(Italy) Roberto Rolfo	Honda CBR600RR	19	+31.822	10	6
11	6	(Switzerland) Dominic Schmitter	Kawasaki ZX-6R	19	+41.505	15	5
12	24	(Spain) Marcos Ramírez	Honda CBR600RR	19	+41.840	19	4
13	41	(Australia) Aiden Wagner	Honda CBR600RR	19	+41.967	17	3
14	36	(Colombia) Martín Cárdenas	Honda CBR600RR	19	+47.343	12	2
15	119	(Hungary) János Chrobák	Honda CBR600RR	19	+47.582	22	1
16	68	(Australia) Glenn Scott	Honda CBR600RR	19	+50.863	23	
17	89	(Spain) Christian Palomares	Yamaha YZF-R6	19	+55.798	18	
18	95	(Czech Republic) Miroslav Popov	MV Agusta F3 675	19	+55.827	24	
19	92	(Hungary) Dávid Juhász	Honda CBR600RR	19	+1:00.942	21	
20	10	(Spain) Nacho Calero	Honda CBR600RR	19	+1:16.337	25	
21	13	(Lithuania) Šarūnas Pladas	Yamaha YZF-R6	19	+1:39.171	27	
Ret	43	(Italy) Kevin Manfredi	Honda CBR600RR	10	Retirement	20	
Ret	52	(Russia) Vladimir Leonov	Yamaha YZF-R6	9	Accident	8	
Ret	4	(United Kingdom) Gino Rea	Honda CBR600RR	6	Accident	7	
Ret	61	(Italy) Fabio Menghi	Yamaha YZF-R6	5	Retirement	14	
Ret	14	(France) Lucas Mahias	Yamaha YZF-R6	1	Technical problem	6	
DNS	53	(Italy) Nicola Jr. Morrentino	MV Agusta F3 675	0	Did not start	26	
Report:
