= 2015 Laguna Seca Superbike World Championship round =

2015 Superbike world championship

(United States) 2015 Laguna Seca Superbike World Championship round
Round details
- Round 9 of 13 rounds in the 2015 Superbike World Championship.
- Date: 19 July, 2015
- Location: Laguna Seca
- Course: Permanent racing facility 3.602 km (2.238 mi)

Superbike World Championship
Pole position
(United Kingdom) Chaz Davies
1:22.101
Fastest lap race 1	Fastest lap race 2
(United Kingdom) Chaz Davies	(United Kingdom) Tom Sykes
1:23.739	1:23.842

The 2015 Laguna Seca Superbike World Championship round was the ninth round of the 2015 Superbike World Championship. It took place over the weekend of 17–19 July 2015 at the Mazda Raceway Laguna Seca located in Monterey, California, United States.

== Superbike race ==
=== Race 1 classification ===
Pos	No.	Rider	Bike	Laps	Time	Grid	Points
1	7	(United Kingdom) Chaz Davies	Ducati Panigale R	25	35:15.693	1	25
2	66	(United Kingdom) Tom Sykes	Kawasaki ZX-10R	25	+1.798	4	20
3	65	(United Kingdom) Jonathan Rea	Kawasaki ZX-10R	25	+2.107	5	16
4	34	(Italy) Davide Giugliano	Ducati Panigale R	25	+15.954	2	13
5	81	(Spain) Jordi Torres	Aprilia RSV4 RF	25	+19.661	3	11
6	22	(United Kingdom) Alex Lowes	Suzuki GSX-R1000	25	+24.431	8	10
7	1	(France) Sylvain Guintoli	Honda CBR1000RR SP	25	+26.971	9	9
8	60	(Netherlands) Michael Van Der Mark	Honda CBR1000RR SP	25	+35.428	15	8
9	36	(Argentina) Leandro Mercado	Ducati Panigale R	25	+41.261	14	7
10	2	(United Kingdom) Leon Camier	MV Agusta 1000 F4	25	+44.383	10	6
11	14	(France) Randy De Puniet	Suzuki GSX-R1000	25	+52.748	17	5
12	40	(Spain) Román Ramos	Kawasaki ZX-10R	25	+54.906	16	4
13	91	(United Kingdom) Leon Haslam	Aprilia RSV4 RF	25	+1:18.150	6	3
14	23	(France) Christophe Ponsson	Kawasaki ZX-10R	25	+1:20.220	18	2
15	45	(Italy) Gianluca Vizziello	Kawasaki ZX-10R	24	+1 lap	21	
16	10	(Hungary) Imre Tóth	BMW S1000RR	24	+1 lap	22	
Ret	44	(Spain) David Salom	Kawasaki ZX-10R	24	Technical problem	11	
Ret	51	(Spain) Santiago Barragán	Kawasaki ZX-10R	19	Technical problem	20	
Ret	75	(Hungary) Gábor Rizmayer	BMW S1000RR	14	Accident	19	
Ret	86	(Italy) Ayrton Badovini	BMW S1000RR	3	Retirement	12	
Ret	15	(Italy) Matteo Baiocco	Ducati Panigale R	0	Accident	13	
Ret	59	(Italy) Niccolò Canepa	Ducati Panigale R	0	Technical problem	7	
Report:

=== Race 2 classification ===
Pos	No.	Rider	Bike	Laps	Time	Grid	Points
1	7	(United Kingdom) Chaz Davies	Ducati Panigale R	25	35:13.816	1	25
2	66	(United Kingdom) Tom Sykes	Kawasaki ZX-10R	25	+1.406	4	20
3	65	(United Kingdom) Jonathan Rea	Kawasaki ZX-10R	25	+1.982	5	16
4	81	(Spain) Jordi Torres	Aprilia RSV4 RF	25	+16.551	3	13
5	91	(United Kingdom) Leon Haslam	Aprilia RSV4 RF	25	+17.772	6	11
6	86	(Italy) Ayrton Badovini	BMW S1000RR	25	+31.735	12	10
7	60	(Netherlands) Michael Van Der Mark	Honda CBR1000RR SP	25	+34.446	15	9
8	59	(Italy) Niccolò Canepa	Ducati Panigale R	25	+38.048	7	8
9	36	(Argentina) Leandro Mercado	Ducati Panigale R	25	+41.755	14	7
10	2	(United Kingdom) Leon Camier	MV Agusta 1000 F4	25	+49.105	10	6
11	14	(France) Randy De Puniet	Suzuki GSX-R1000	25	+56.249	17	5
12	40	(Spain) Román Ramos	Kawasaki ZX-10R	25	+1:01.630	16	4
13	15	(Italy) Matteo Baiocco	Ducati Panigale R	25	+1:12.647	13	3
14	45	(Italy) Gianluca Vizziello	Kawasaki ZX-10R	24	+1 lap	21	2
15	23	(France) Christophe Ponsson	Kawasaki ZX-10R	24	+1 lap	18	1
16	75	(Hungary) Gábor Rizmayer	BMW S1000RR	24	+1 lap	19	
17	10	(Hungary) Imre Tóth	BMW S1000RR	23	+2 lap	22	
18	51	(Spain) Santiago Barragán	Kawasaki ZX-10R	22	+3 lap	20	
Ret	22	(United Kingdom) Alex Lowes	Suzuki GSX-R1000	6	Retirement	8	
Ret	44	(Spain) David Salom	Kawasaki ZX-10R	3	Retirement	11	
Ret	34	(Italy) Davide Giugliano	Ducati Panigale R	1	Accident	2	
Ret	1	(France) Sylvain Guintoli	Honda CBR1000RR SP	1	Accident	9	
Report:
