= 2015 Superbike World Championship =

2015 Superbike World Championship
Previous:	2014	Next:	2016
Support series: Supersport World Championship; FIM Superstock 1000 Cup; European Superstock 600 Championship; European Junior Cup

The 2015 Superbike World Championship was the twenty-eighth season of the Superbike World Championship. Jonathan Rea became 2015 World Superbike Champion.

== Race calendar and results ==
2015 Superbike World Championship Calendar
Round		Country	Circuit	Date	Superpole	Fastest lap	Winning rider	Winning team	Report
1	R1	Australia	Phillip Island Grand Prix Circuit	22 February	(United Kingdom) Jonathan Rea	(United Kingdom) Leon Haslam	(United Kingdom) Jonathan Rea	Kawasaki Racing Team	Report
1	R2	Australia	Phillip Island Grand Prix Circuit	22 February	(United Kingdom) Jonathan Rea	(United Kingdom) Chaz Davies	(United Kingdom) Leon Haslam	Aprilia Racing Team – Red Devils	Report
2	R1	Thailand	Chang International Circuit	22 March	(United Kingdom) Jonathan Rea	(United Kingdom) Jonathan Rea	(United Kingdom) Jonathan Rea	Kawasaki Racing Team	Report
2	R2	Thailand	Chang International Circuit	22 March	(United Kingdom) Jonathan Rea	(United Kingdom) Jonathan Rea	(United Kingdom) Jonathan Rea	Kawasaki Racing Team	Report
3	R1	Spain	Motorland Aragón	12 April	(United Kingdom) Leon Haslam	(United Kingdom) Tom Sykes	(United Kingdom) Jonathan Rea	Kawasaki Racing Team	Report
3	R2	Spain	Motorland Aragón	12 April	(United Kingdom) Leon Haslam	(United Kingdom) Chaz Davies	(United Kingdom) Chaz Davies	Aruba.it Racing–Ducati SBK Team	Report
4	R1	Netherlands	TT Circuit Assen	19 April	(United Kingdom) Tom Sykes	(United Kingdom) Jonathan Rea	(United Kingdom) Jonathan Rea	Kawasaki Racing Team	Report
4	R2	Netherlands	TT Circuit Assen	19 April	(United Kingdom) Tom Sykes	(United Kingdom) Chaz Davies	(United Kingdom) Jonathan Rea	Kawasaki Racing Team	Report
5	R1	Italy	Autodromo Enzo e Dino Ferrari	10 May	(Italy) Davide Giugliano	(United Kingdom) Tom Sykes	(United Kingdom) Jonathan Rea	Kawasaki Racing Team	Report
5	R2	Italy	Autodromo Enzo e Dino Ferrari	10 May	(Italy) Davide Giugliano	(United Kingdom) Jonathan Rea	(United Kingdom) Jonathan Rea	Kawasaki Racing Team	Report
6	R1	United Kingdom	Donington Park	24 May	(United Kingdom) Tom Sykes	(United Kingdom) Jonathan Rea	(United Kingdom) Tom Sykes	Kawasaki Racing Team	Report
6	R2	United Kingdom	Donington Park	24 May	(United Kingdom) Tom Sykes	(United Kingdom) Tom Sykes	(United Kingdom) Tom Sykes	Kawasaki Racing Team	Report
7	R1	Portugal	Autódromo Internacional do Algarve	7 June	(Italy) Davide Giugliano	(United Kingdom) Jonathan Rea	(United Kingdom) Jonathan Rea	Kawasaki Racing Team	Report
7	R2	Portugal	Autódromo Internacional do Algarve	7 June	(Italy) Davide Giugliano	(United Kingdom) Jonathan Rea	(United Kingdom) Jonathan Rea	Kawasaki Racing Team	Report
8	R1	Italy	Misano World Circuit Marco Simoncelli	21 June	(United Kingdom) Tom Sykes	(Italy) Davide Giugliano	(United Kingdom) Tom Sykes	Kawasaki Racing Team	Report
8	R2	Italy	Misano World Circuit Marco Simoncelli	21 June	(United Kingdom) Tom Sykes	(United Kingdom) Jonathan Rea	(United Kingdom) Jonathan Rea	Kawasaki Racing Team	Report
9	R1	United States	Mazda Raceway Laguna Seca	19 July	(United Kingdom) Chaz Davies	(United Kingdom) Chaz Davies	(United Kingdom) Chaz Davies	Aruba.it Racing–Ducati SBK Team	Report
9	R2	United States	Mazda Raceway Laguna Seca	19 July	(United Kingdom) Chaz Davies	(United Kingdom) Tom Sykes	(United Kingdom) Chaz Davies	Aruba.it Racing–Ducati SBK Team	Report
10	R1	Malaysia	Sepang International Circuit	2 August	(United Kingdom) Tom Sykes	(United Kingdom) Tom Sykes	(United Kingdom) Jonathan Rea	Kawasaki Racing Team	Report
10	R2	Malaysia	Sepang International Circuit	2 August	(United Kingdom) Tom Sykes	(United Kingdom) Chaz Davies	(United Kingdom) Chaz Davies	Aruba.it Racing–Ducati SBK Team	Report
11	R1	Spain	Circuito de Jerez	20 September	(United Kingdom) Tom Sykes	(United Kingdom) Jonathan Rea	(United Kingdom) Tom Sykes	Kawasaki Racing Team	Report
11	R2	Spain	Circuito de Jerez	20 September	(United Kingdom) Tom Sykes	(United Kingdom) Tom Sykes	(United Kingdom) Chaz Davies	Aruba.it Racing–Ducati SBK Team	Report
12	R1	France	Circuit de Nevers Magny-Cours	4 October	(United Kingdom) Leon Haslam	(United Kingdom) Jonathan Rea	(United Kingdom) Jonathan Rea	Kawasaki Racing Team	Report
12	R2	France	Circuit de Nevers Magny-Cours	4 October	(United Kingdom) Leon Haslam	(United Kingdom) Jonathan Rea	(United Kingdom) Jonathan Rea	Kawasaki Racing Team	Report
13	R1	Qatar	Losail International Circuit	18 October	(United Kingdom) Tom Sykes	(United Kingdom) Tom Sykes	(Spain) Jordi Torres	Aprilia Racing Team – Red Devils	Report
13	R2	Qatar	Losail International Circuit	18 October	(United Kingdom) Tom Sykes	(United Kingdom) Leon Haslam	(United Kingdom) Leon Haslam	Aprilia Racing Team – Red Devils	Report

== Entry list ==
2015 entry list
Team	Constructor	Motorcycle	No.	Rider	Rounds
(Italy) Aprilia Racing Team	Aprilia	Aprilia RSV4 RF	3	(Italy) Max Biaggi	8, 10
(Italy) Aprilia Racing Team – Red Devils	Aprilia	Aprilia RSV4 RF	81	(Spain) Jordi Torres	All
(Italy) Aprilia Racing Team – Red Devils	Aprilia	Aprilia RSV4 RF	91	(United Kingdom) Leon Haslam	All
(Italy) BMW Motorrad Italia SBK Team	BMW	BMW S1000RR	20	(France) Sylvain Barrier	1–2
(Italy) BMW Motorrad Italia SBK Team	BMW	BMW S1000RR	86	(Italy) Ayrton Badovini	3–13
(Hungary) BMW Team Tóth	BMW	BMW S1000RR	5	(Poland) Ireneusz Sikora	2
(Hungary) BMW Team Tóth	BMW	BMW S1000RR	10	(Hungary) Imre Tóth	All
(Hungary) BMW Team Tóth	BMW	BMW S1000RR	75	(Hungary) Gábor Rizmayer	1, 3–13
(Thailand) RAC Oil Racing Team	BMW	BMW S1000RR	53	(Thailand) Chanon Chumjai	2
(Germany) VanZon Remeha BMW	BMW	BMW S1000RR	11	(Germany) Markus Reiterberger	8, 12
(Italy) Althea Racing	Ducati	Ducati Panigale R	15	(Italy) Matteo Baiocco	All
(Italy) Althea Racing	Ducati	Ducati Panigale R	18	(Spain) Nicolás Terol	1–4, 6–7
(Italy) Althea Racing	Ducati	Ducati Panigale R	59	(Italy) Niccolò Canepa	8–13
(Italy) Althea Racing	Ducati	Ducati Panigale R	84	(Italy) Michel Fabrizio	5
(Italy) Aruba.it Racing–Ducati SBK Team	Ducati	Ducati Panigale R	7	(United Kingdom) Chaz Davies	All
(Italy) Aruba.it Racing–Ducati SBK Team	Ducati	Ducati Panigale R	21	(Australia) Troy Bayliss	1–2
(Italy) Aruba.it Racing–Ducati SBK Team	Ducati	Ducati Panigale R	34	(Italy) Davide Giugliano	5–9
(Italy) Aruba.it Racing–Ducati SBK Team	Ducati	Ducati Panigale R	55	(Italy) Michele Pirro	8
(Italy) Aruba.it Racing–Ducati SBK Team	Ducati	Ducati Panigale R	55	(Italy) Michele Pirro	11
(Italy) Aruba.it Racing–Ducati SBK Team	Ducati	Ducati Panigale R	99	(Italy) Luca Scassa	(Note: Luca Scassa was entered into the Misano round but was replaced by Michele Pirro after two practice sessions due to injury.)
(Italy) Aruba.it Racing–Ducati SBK Team	Ducati	Ducati Panigale R	99	(Italy) Luca Scassa	12
(Italy) Aruba.it Racing–Ducati SBK Team	Ducati	Ducati Panigale R	112	(Spain) Javier Forés	3–4, 13
(Italy) Barni Racing Team	Ducati	Ducati Panigale R	36	(Argentina) Leandro Mercado	All
(United States) Team Hero EBR	EBR	EBR 1190RX	59	(Italy) Niccolò Canepa	1–4
(United States) Team Hero EBR	EBR	EBR 1190RX	72	(United States) Larry Pegram	1–4
(Netherlands) Pata Honda World Superbike Team	Honda	Honda CBR1000RR SP	1	(France) Sylvain Guintoli	All
(Netherlands) Pata Honda World Superbike Team	Honda	Honda CBR1000RR SP	60	(Netherlands) Michael van der Mark	All
(Thailand) YSS TS Racing	Honda	Honda CBR1000RR SP	9	(Thailand) Anucha Nakcharoensri	2
(Italy) MV Agusta Reparto Corse	MV Agusta	MV Agusta 1000 F4	2	(United Kingdom) Leon Camier	All
(Italy) Grillini SBK Team	Kawasaki	Kawasaki ZX-10R	23	(France) Christophe Ponsson	1–4
(Italy) Grillini SBK Team	Kawasaki	Kawasaki ZX-10R	45	(Italy) Gianluca Vizziello	8–13
(Italy) Grillini SBK Team	Kawasaki	Kawasaki ZX-10R	48	(Australia) Alex Phillis	10–13
(Italy) Grillini SBK Team	Kawasaki	Kawasaki ZX-10R	51	(Spain) Santiago Barragán	1–9
(Italy) Grillini SBK Team	Kawasaki	Kawasaki ZX-10R	59	(Italy) Niccolò Canepa	5–7
(Japan) Kawasaki Racing Team	Kawasaki	Kawasaki ZX-10R	65	(United Kingdom) Jonathan Rea	All
(Japan) Kawasaki Racing Team	Kawasaki	Kawasaki ZX-10R	66	(United Kingdom) Tom Sykes	All
(Australia) Race Center – Demolition Plus	Kawasaki	Kawasaki ZX-10R	77	(Australia) Jed Metcher	1
(Italy) Team Go Eleven	Kawasaki	Kawasaki ZX-10R	40	(Spain) Román Ramos	All
(Italy) Team Pedercini	Kawasaki	Kawasaki ZX-10R	12	(Australia) Matthew Walters	1
(Italy) Team Pedercini	Kawasaki	Kawasaki ZX-10R	23	(France) Christophe Ponsson	5–13
(Italy) Team Pedercini	Kawasaki	Kawasaki ZX-10R	43	(South Africa) Greg Gildenhuys	2
(Italy) Team Pedercini	Kawasaki	Kawasaki ZX-10R	44	(Spain) David Salom	All
(Italy) Team Pedercini	Kawasaki	Kawasaki ZX-10R	90	(Spain) Javier Alviz	3–4
(United Kingdom) Voltcom Crescent Suzuki	Suzuki	Suzuki GSX-R1000	14	(France) Randy de Puniet	All
(United Kingdom) Voltcom Crescent Suzuki	Suzuki	Suzuki GSX-R1000	22	(United Kingdom) Alex Lowes	All
(Poland) Szkopek POLand Position	Yamaha	Yamaha YZF-R1	19	(Poland) Paweł Szkopek	12

Key
Regular rider
Wildcard rider
Replacement rider

- All entries used Pirelli tyres.

== Championship standings ==
=== Riders' championship ===
Pos.	Rider	Bike	PHI (Australia)		CHA (Thailand)		ARA (Spain)		ASS (Netherlands)		IMO (Italy)		DON (United Kingdom)		POR (Portugal)		MIS (Italy)		LAG (United States)		SEP (Malaysia)		JER (Spain)		MAG (France)		LOS (Qatar)		Pts
Pos.	Rider	Bike	R1	R2	R1	R2	R1	R2	R1	R2	R1	R2	R1	R2	R1	R2	R1	R2	R1	R2	R1	R2	R1	R2	R1	R2	R1	R2	Pts
1	(United Kingdom) Jonathan Rea	Kawasaki	**1**	**2**	**1**	**1**	1	2	1	1	1	1	2	2	1	1	2	1	3	3	1	2	4	4	1	1	2	Ret	548
2	(United Kingdom) Chaz Davies	Ducati	3	3	11	15	2	1	2	2	Ret	Ret	3	3	3	4	3	4	**1**	**1**	2	1	2	1	6	2	4	2	416
3	(United Kingdom) Tom Sykes	Kawasaki	6	4	3	5	3	Ret	**5**	**5**	2	2	**1**	**1**	2	8	**1**	**5**	2	2	**5**	**14**	**1**	**5**	2	3	**3**	**3**	399
4	(United Kingdom) Leon Haslam	Aprilia	2	1	2	2	**4**	**3**	4	4	4	Ret	4	4	12	3	5	3	13	5	7	6	5	3	**16**	**5**	6	1	332
5	(Spain) Jordi Torres	Aprilia	4	Ret	4	4	5	4	6	6	Ret	3	7	7	11	7	Ret	7	5	4	10	3	12	2	12	8	1	Ret	247
6	(France) Sylvain Guintoli	Honda	7	5	5	6	9	Ret	8	7	5	Ret	8	8	5	6	9	9	7	Ret	4	4	10	9	3	6	10	5	218
7	(Netherlands) Michael van der Mark	Honda	5	Ret	Ret	7	Ret	8	3	3	9	Ret	DSQ	Ret	9	5	10	10	8	7	Ret	5	3	13	4	4	5	4	194
8	(Argentina) Leandro Mercado	Ducati	12	11	10	10	8	7	11	14	7	8	11	13	8	9	11	Ret	9	9	15	15	14	10	9	12	9	6	142
9	(Italy) Matteo Baiocco	Ducati	11	9	6	8	12	11	12	11	8	6	Ret	10	6	10	15	Ret	Ret	13	8	9	8	6	7	11	DNS	DNS	139
10	(United Kingdom) Alex Lowes	Suzuki	9	Ret	7	3	NC	14	Ret	9	12	10	6	6	10	13	12	Ret	6	Ret	6	8	7	18	8	10	Ret	Ret	135
11	(Italy) Davide Giugliano	Ducati									**3**	**4**	17	5	**4**	**2**	4	2	4	Ret									119
12	(Italy) Ayrton Badovini	BMW					Ret	9	Ret	12	6	5	5	9	7	12	7	11	Ret	6	DNS	DNS	15	14	14	Ret	11	10	103
13	(United Kingdom) Leon Camier	MV Agusta	10	8	Ret	Ret	10	15	10	10	Ret	Ret	9	Ret	Ret	Ret	13	16	10	10	13	12	9	8	5	15	Ret	Ret	89
14	(Spain) David Salom	Kawasaki	DNS	DNS	8	9	Ret	6	14	13	Ret	DNS	10	12	14	Ret	17	15	Ret	Ret	11	7	11	12	Ret	14	8	9	83
15	(Spain) Román Ramos	Kawasaki	16	10	15	14	13	12	13	15	11	7	13	11	16	11	14	14	12	12	14	10	13	Ret	15	16	Ret	Ret	71
16	(Italy) Niccolò Canepa	EBR	Ret	DNS	Ret	DNS	15	18	15	Ret																			55
16	(Italy) Niccolò Canepa	Kawasaki									DNS	DNS	15	Ret	17	17													55
16	(Italy) Niccolò Canepa	Ducati															Ret	12	Ret	8	9	11	17	11	10	7	Ret	8	55
17	(Spain) Nicolás Terol	Ducati	8	6	12	12	7	10	9	Ret			12	Ret	15	15													54
18	(France) Randy de Puniet	Suzuki	17	7	13	Ret	Ret	13	Ret	Ret	Ret	Ret	14	14	13	16	Ret	17	11	11	12	13	16	Ret	Ret	18	12	7	52
19	(Spain) Javier Forés	Ducati					6	5	7	8																	7	DNS	47
20	(Italy) Max Biaggi	Aprilia															6	6			3	Ret							36
21	(Italy) Michele Pirro	Ducati															8	8					6	7					35
22	(France) Christophe Ponsson	Kawasaki	Ret	15	Ret	Ret	14	16	16	16	14	Ret	16	Ret	18	14	18	18	14	15	16	16	21	15	18	19	14	11	18
23	(Spain) Santiago Barragán	Kawasaki	19	13	17	Ret	11	17	17	Ret	13	11	Ret	15	Ret	Ret	19	20	Ret	18									17
24	(Australia) Troy Bayliss	Ducati	13	16	9	11																							15
25	(Italy) Michel Fabrizio	Ducati									10	9																	13
26	(Italy) Gianluca Vizziello	Kawasaki															20	19	15	14	Ret	17	22	17	11	17	15	12	13
27	(Italy) Luca Scassa	Ducati															WD	WD							13	9			10
28	(France) Sylvain Barrier	BMW	15	12	14	13																							10
29	(Hungary) Gábor Rizmayer	BMW	DNS	DNS			19	Ret	18	18	16	13	18	16	19	18	21	21	Ret	16	17	18	18	16	17	20	13	13	9
30	(Hungary) Imre Tóth	BMW	20	17	18	18	18	20	Ret	Ret	15	12	19	17	20	19	22	22	16	17	19	20	20	20	20	21	17	14	7
31	(Germany) Markus Reiterberger	BMW															16	13							21	13			6
32	(United States) Larry Pegram	EBR	18	14	Ret	DNS	17	19	Ret	Ret																			2
33	(Australia) Jed Metcher	Kawasaki	14	Ret																									2
34	(Australia) Alex Phillis	Kawasaki																			18	19	19	19	19	22	16	15	1
	(South Africa) Greg Gildenhuys	Kawasaki			16	16																							0
	(Spain) Javier Alviz	Kawasaki					16	Ret	Ret	17																			0
	(Thailand) Anucha Nakcharoensri	Honda			Ret	17																							0
	(Poland) Ireneusz Sikora	BMW			19	19																							0
	(Thailand) Chanon Chumjai	BMW			Ret	20																							0
	(Poland) Paweł Szkopek	Yamaha																							Ret	Ret			0
	(Australia) Matthew Walters	Kawasaki	DNS	DNS																									0
Pos.	Rider	Bike	PHI (Australia)		CHA (Thailand)		ARA (Spain)		ASS (Netherlands)		IMO (Italy)		DON (United Kingdom)		POR (Portugal)		MIS (Italy)		LAG (United States)		SEP (Malaysia)		JER (Spain)		MAG (France)		LOS (Qatar)		Pts

Colour	Result
Gold	Winner
Silver	Second place
Bronze	Third place
Green	Points classification
Blue	Non-points classification
Blue	Non-classified finish (NC)
Purple	Retired, not classified (Ret)
Red	Did not qualify (DNQ)
Red	Did not pre-qualify (DNPQ)
Black	Disqualified (DSQ)
White	Did not start (DNS)
White	Withdrew (WD)
White	Race cancelled (C)
Blank	Did not practice (DNP)
Blank	Did not arrive (DNA)
Blank	Excluded (EX)

**Bold** – Pole position
Italics – Fastest lap

=== Teams' championship ===
Pos.	Team	Bike No.	PHI (Australia)		CHA (Thailand)		ARA (Spain)		ASS (Netherlands)		IMO (Italy)		DON (United Kingdom)		POR (Portugal)		MIS (Italy)		LAG (United States)		SEP (Malaysia)		JER (Spain)		MAG (France)		LOS (Qatar)		Pts.
Pos.	Team	Bike No.	R1	R2	R1	R2	R1	R2	R1	R2	R1	R2	R1	R2	R1	R2	R1	R2	R1	R2	R1	R2	R1	R2	R1	R2	R1	R2	Pts.
1	(Japan) Kawasaki Racing Team	65	**1**	**2**	**1**	**1**	1	2	1	1	1	1	2	2	1	1	2	1	3	3	1	2	4	4	1	1	2	Ret	947
1	(Japan) Kawasaki Racing Team	66	6	4	3	5	3	Ret	**5**	**5**	2	2	**1**	**1**	2	8	**1**	**5**	2	2	**5**	**14**	**1**	**5**	2	3	**3**	**3**	947
2	(Italy) Aruba.it Racing–Ducati SBK Team	7	3	3	11	15	2	1	2	2	Ret	Ret	3	3	3	4	3	4	**1**	**1**	2	1	2	1	6	2	4	2	626
2	(Italy) Aruba.it Racing–Ducati SBK Team	34									**3**	**4**	17	5	**4**	**2**	4	2	4	Ret									626
2	(Italy) Aruba.it Racing–Ducati SBK Team	112					6	5	7	8																	7	DNS	626
2	(Italy) Aruba.it Racing–Ducati SBK Team	55															8	8					6	7					626
2	(Italy) Aruba.it Racing–Ducati SBK Team	21	13	16	9	11																							626
2	(Italy) Aruba.it Racing–Ducati SBK Team	99															WD	WD							13	9			626
3	(Italy) Aprilia Racing Team – Red Devils	91	2	1	2	2	**4**	**3**	4	4	4	Ret	4	4	12	3	5	3	13	5	7	6	5	3	**16**	**5**	6	1	564
3	(Italy) Aprilia Racing Team – Red Devils	81	4	Ret	4	4	5	4	6	6	Ret	3	7	7	11	7	Ret	7	5	4	10	3	12	2	12	8	1	Ret	564
4	(Netherlands) Pata Honda World Superbike Team	1	7	5	5	6	9	Ret	8	7	5	Ret	8	8	5	6	9	9	7	Ret	4	4	10	9	3	6	10	5	412
4	(Netherlands) Pata Honda World Superbike Team	60	5	Ret	Ret	7	Ret	8	3	3	9	Ret	DSQ	Ret	9	5	10	10	8	7	Ret	5	3	13	4	4	5	4	412
5	(Italy) Althea Racing	15	11	9	6	8	12	11	12	11	8	6	Ret	10	6	10	15	Ret	Ret	13	8	9	8	6	7	11	DNS	DNS	258
5	(Italy) Althea Racing	18	8	6	12	12	7	10	9	Ret			12	Ret	15	15													258
5	(Italy) Althea Racing	59															Ret	12	Ret	8	9	11	17	11	10	7	Ret	8	258
5	(Italy) Althea Racing	84									10	9																	258
6	(United Kingdom) Voltcom Crescent Suzuki	22	9	Ret	7	3	NC	14	Ret	9	12	10	6	6	10	13	12	Ret	6	Ret	6	8	7	18	8	10	Ret	Ret	187
6	(United Kingdom) Voltcom Crescent Suzuki	14	17	7	13	Ret	Ret	13	Ret	Ret	Ret	Ret	14	14	13	16	Ret	17	11	11	12	13	16	Ret	Ret	18	12	7	187
7	(Italy) Barni Racing Team	36	12	11	10	10	8	7	11	14	7	8	11	13	8	9	11	Ret	9	9	15	15	14	10	9	12	9	6	142
8	(Italy) BMW Motorrad Italia SBK Team	86					Ret	9	Ret	12	6	5	5	9	7	12	7	11	Ret	6	DNS	DNS	15	14	14	Ret	11	10	113
8	(Italy) BMW Motorrad Italia SBK Team	20	15	12	14	13																							113
9	(Italy) Team Pedercini	44	DNS	DNS	8	9	Ret	6	14	13	Ret	DNS	10	12	14	Ret	17	15	Ret	Ret	11	7	11	12	Ret	14	8	9	98
9	(Italy) Team Pedercini	23									14	Ret	16	Ret	18	14	18	18	14	15	16	16	21	15	18	19	14	11	98
9	(Italy) Team Pedercini	43			16	16																							98
9	(Italy) Team Pedercini	90					16	Ret	Ret	17																			98
9	(Italy) Team Pedercini	12	DNS	DNS																									98
10	(Italy) MV Agusta Reparto Corse	2	10	8	Ret	Ret	10	15	10	10	Ret	Ret	9	Ret	Ret	Ret	13	16	10	10	13	12	9	8	5	15	Ret	Ret	89
11	(Italy) Team Go Eleven	40	16	10	15	14	13	12	13	15	11	7	13	11	16	11	14	14	12	12	14	10	13	Ret	15	16	Ret	Ret	71
12	(Italy) Aprilia Racing Team	3															6	6			3	Ret							36
13	(Italy) Grillini SBK Team	51	19	13	17	Ret	11	17	17	Ret	13	11	Ret	15	Ret	Ret	19	20	Ret	18									35
13	(Italy) Grillini SBK Team	45															20	19	15	14	Ret	17	22	17	11	17	15	12	35
13	(Italy) Grillini SBK Team	23	Ret	15	Ret	Ret	14	16	16	16																			35
13	(Italy) Grillini SBK Team	57									DNS	DNS	15	Ret	17	17													35
13	(Italy) Grillini SBK Team	48																			18	19	19	19	19	22	16	15	35
14	(Hungary) BMW Team Tóth	75	DNS	DNS			19	Ret	18	18	16	13	18	16	19	18	21	21	Ret	16	17	18	18	16	17	20	13	13	16
14	(Hungary) BMW Team Tóth	10	20	17	18	18	18	20	Ret	Ret	15	12	19	17	20	19	22	22	16	17	19	20	20	20	20	21	17	14	16
14	(Hungary) BMW Team Tóth	5			19	19																							16
15	(Germany) VanZon Remeha BMW	11															16	13							21	13			6
16	(United States) Team Hero EBR	59	Ret	DNS	Ret	DNS	15	18	15	Ret																			4
16	(United States) Team Hero EBR	72	18	14	Ret	DNS	17	19	Ret	Ret																			4
17	(Australia) Race Center – Demolition Plus	77	14	Ret																									
	(Thailand) YSS TS Racing	9			Ret	17																							0
	(Thailand) RAC Oil Racing Team	53			Ret	20																							0
	(Poland) Szkopek POLand Position	19																							Ret	Ret			0
Pos.	Team	Bike No.	PHI (Australia)		CHA (Thailand)		ARA (Spain)		ASS (Netherlands)		IMO (Italy)		DON (United Kingdom)		POR (Portugal)		MIS (Italy)		LAG (United States)		SEP (Malaysia)		JER (Spain)		MAG (France)		LOS (Qatar)		Pts.

=== Manufacturers' championship ===
Pos.	Manufacturer	PHI (Australia)		CHA (Thailand)		ARA (Spain)		ASS (Netherlands)		IMO (Italy)		DON (United Kingdom)		POR (Portugal)		MIS (Italy)		LAG (United States)		SEP (Malaysia)		JER (Spain)		MAG (France)		LOS (Qatar)		Pts
Pos.	Manufacturer	R1	R2	R1	R2	R1	R2	R1	R2	R1	R2	R1	R2	R1	R2	R1	R2	R1	R2	R1	R2	R1	R2	R1	R2	R1	R2	Pts
1	(Japan) Kawasaki	1	2	1	1	1	2	1	1	1	1	1	1	1	1	1	1	2	2	1	2	1	4	1	1	2	3	599
2	(Italy) Ducati	3	3	6	8	2	1	2	2	3	4	3	3	3	2	3	2	1	1	2	1	2	1	6	2	4	2	471
3	(Italy) Aprilia	2	1	2	2	4	3	4	4	4	3	4	4	11	3	5	3	5	4	3	3	5	2	12	5	1	1	395
4	(Japan) Honda	5	5	5	6	9	8	3	3	5	Ret	8	8	5	5	9	9	7	7	4	4	3	9	3	4	5	4	273
5	(Japan) Suzuki	9	7	7	3	NC	13	Ret	9	12	10	6	6	10	13	12	17	6	11	6	8	7	18	8	10	12	7	163
6	(Germany) BMW	15	12	14	13	18	9	18	12	6	5	5	9	7	12	7	11	16	6	17	18	15	14	14	13	11	10	116
7	(Italy) MV Agusta	10	8	Ret	Ret	10	15	10	10	Ret	Ret	9	Ret	Ret	Ret	13	16	10	10	13	12	9	8	5	15	Ret	Ret	89
8	(United States) EBR	18	14	Ret	DNS	15	18	15	Ret																			4
	(Japan) Yamaha																							Ret	Ret			0
Pos.	Manufacturer	PHI (Australia)		CHA (Thailand)		ARA (Spain)		ASS (Netherlands)		IMO (Italy)		DON (United Kingdom)		POR (Portugal)		MIS (Italy)		LAG (United States)		SEP (Malaysia)		JER (Spain)		MAG (France)		LOS (Qatar)		Pts
