= Kevin Wahr =

German motorcycle racer

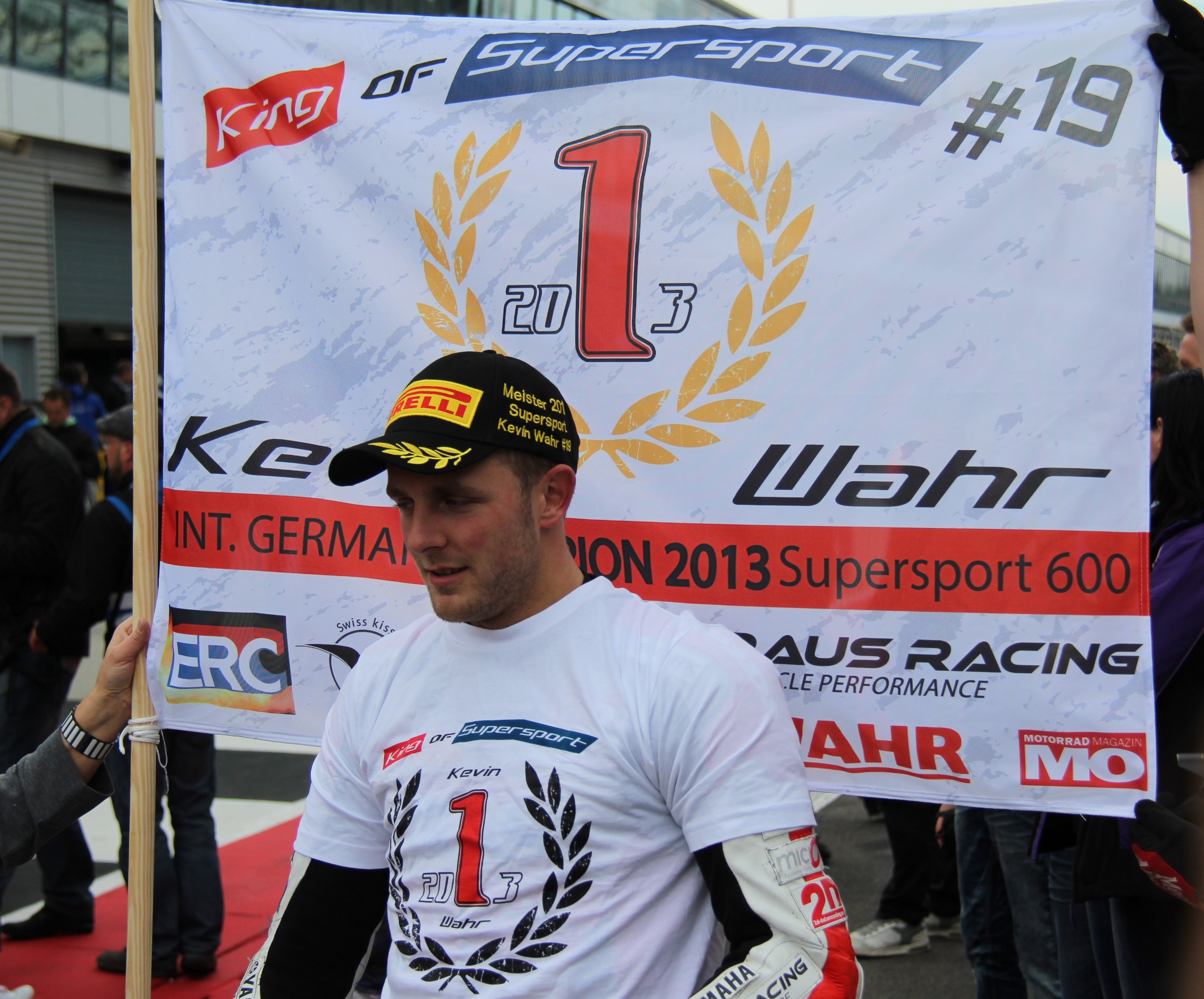
- Wahr in 2013
- Nationality: German
- Born: 24 March 1989 (age 37); Nagold, Germany
- Current team: Team Romero
- Bike number: 19
Motorcycle racing career statistics
Moto2 World Championship
| Active years | 2012 |
| Manufacturers | IAMT |
| 2012 championship position | NC (0 pts) |
Starts / Wins / Podiums / Poles / F. laps / Points; 1 / 0 / 0 / 0 / 0 / 0
Supersport World Championship
| Active years | 2009, 2013–2016 |
| Manufacturers | Triumph, Honda, Yamaha |
| 2016 championship position | 22nd (17 pts) |
Starts / Wins / Podiums / Poles / F. laps / Points; 28 / 0 / 0 / 0 / 0 / 75

Kevin Wahr (born 24 March 1989 in Nagold) is a German motorcycle racer. In 2017, he rode a Yamaha YZF-R6 in the IDM Superstock 600 Championship. He was the IDM Supersport champion in 2013. He previously competed in the Supersport World Championship.

== Career statistics ==
2007 - NC, European Superstock 600 Championship, Yamaha YZF-R6

=== European Superstock 600 ===
==== Races by year ====
(key) (Races in bold indicate pole position, races in italics indicate fastest lap)

| Year | Bike | 1 | 2 | 3 | 4 | 5 | 6 | 7 | 8 | 9 | 10 | 11 | 12 | Pos | Pts |
|---|---|---|---|---|---|---|---|---|---|---|---|---|---|---|---|
| 2007 | Yamaha | DON | SPA | ASS | MNZ | SIL | MIS | BRN | BRA | BRA | LAU; DSQ | VAL | MAG | NC | 0 |

=== Supersport World Championship ===
==== Races by year ====
(key)

| Year | Bike | 1 | 2 | 3 | 4 | 5 | 6 | 7 | 8 | 9 | 10 | 11 | 12 | 13 | 14 | Pos. | Pts |
|---|---|---|---|---|---|---|---|---|---|---|---|---|---|---|---|---|---|
| 2009 | Triumph | AUS | QAT | SPA | NED | ITA | RSA | USA | SMR | GBR | CZE | GER; 14 | ITA | FRA | POR | 33rd | 2 |
| 2013 | Honda | AUS | SPA | NED | ITA | GBR | POR | ITA | RUS | GBR | GER; Ret | TUR | FRA | SPA | | NC | 0 |
| 2014 | Yamaha | AUS; 6 | SPA; Ret | NED; 10 | ITA; 9 | GBR; Ret | MAL | ITA; 13 | POR | SPA | FRA; Ret | QAT | | | | 16th | 26 |
| 2015 | Honda | AUS; 16 | THA; 12 | SPA; 12 | NED; Ret | ITA; Ret | GBR; Ret | POR; Ret | ITA; 14 | MAL; 13 | SPA; 9 | FRA; 6 | QAT; Ret | | | 17th | 30 |
| 2016 | Honda | AUS; DNS | THA; 12 | SPA; 9 | NED; 16 | ITA; 11 | MAL; Ret | GBR | ITA; 15 | GER; 16 | FRA | SPA | QAT | | | 22nd | 17 |

=== Grand Prix motorcycle racing ===
==== By season ====
| Season | Class | Motorcycle | Team | Race | Win | Podium | Pole | FLap | Pts | Plcd |
|---|---|---|---|---|---|---|---|---|---|---|
| 2012 | Moto2 | IAMT | Kiefer Racing | 1 | 0 | 0 | 0 | 0 | 0 | NC |
| Total | | | | **1** | **0** | **0** | **0** | **0** | **0** | |

==== Races by year ====
(key)

| Year | Class | Bike | 1 | 2 | 3 | 4 | 5 | 6 | 7 | 8 | 9 | 10 | 11 | 12 | 13 | 14 | 15 | 16 | 17 | Pos. | Pts |
|---|---|---|---|---|---|---|---|---|---|---|---|---|---|---|---|---|---|---|---|---|---|
| 2012 | Moto2 | IAMT | QAT | SPA | POR | FRA | CAT | GBR | NED | GER; 23 | ITA | INP | CZE | RSM | ARA | JPN | MAL | AUS | VAL | NC | 0 |
