= Fabio Menghi =

Italian motorcycle racer

- Nationality: Italian
- Born: 19 February 1986 (age 40); Rimini, Italy
- Current team: VFT Racing
- Bike number: 61
- Website: www.fabiomenghi.com
Motorcycle racing career statistics
Superbike World Championship
Active years	2016–2017
Manufacturers	Ducati
2017 championship position	NC (0 pts)
Starts / Wins / Podiums / Poles / F. laps / Points; 4 / 0 / 0 / 0 / 0 / 0
Supersport World Championship
Active years	2010–2015
Manufacturers	Yamaha
2015 championship position	15th (44 pts)
Starts / Wins / Podiums / Poles / F. laps / Points; 44 / 0 / 0 / 0 / 0 / 70

Fabio Menghi (born 19 February 1986) is an Italian motorcycle racer. He competes in the CIV Superbike Championship aboard a Ducati Panigale. He raced in the Supersport World Championship from 2010 to 2015 and the Superbike World Championship in 2016 and 2017. His brother, Omar Menghi, is also a motorcycle racer.

== Career statistics ==
=== Supersport World Championship ===
==== Races by year ====
Year	Bike	1	2	3	4	5	6	7	8	9	10	11	12	13	Pos.	Pts
2010	Yamaha	AUS	POR	SPA	NED	ITA	RSA	USA	SMR; 17	CZE	GBR	GER	ITA	FRA	NC	0
2011	Yamaha	AUS	EUR	NED	ITA	SMR	SPA	CZE	GBR	GER	ITA; DNS	FRA	POR		NC	0
2012	Yamaha	AUS; 15	ITA; Ret	NED; Ret	ITA; 21	EUR; 24	SMR; Ret	SPA; 14	CZE; 21	GBR; 22	RUS; 17	GER; Ret	POR; Ret	FRA; 21	36th	3
2013	Yamaha	AUS; Ret	SPA; 14	NED; DNS	ITA	GBR	POR; 24	ITA; 15	RUS; C	GBR; 24	GER; 24	TUR; 16	FRA; DNS	SPA; WD	28th	3
2014	Yamaha	AUS; 9	SPA; 15	NED; 15	ITA; 6	GBR; Ret	MAL; Ret	ITA; 17	POR; 15	SPA; 17	FRA; Ret	QAT; 18			18th	20
2015	Yamaha	AUS; 15	THA; Ret	SPA; 7	NED; 12	ITA; 12	GBR; Ret	POR; 10	ITA; 6	MAL; 12	SPA; Ret	FRA; 20	QAT; 10		15th	44

=== Superbike World Championship ===
==== Races by year ====
Year	Make	1		2		3		4		5		6		7		8		9		10		11		12		13		Pos.	Pts
Year	Make	R1	R2	R1	R2	R1	R2	R1	R2	R1	R2	R1	R2	R1	R2	R1	R2	R1	R2	R1	R2	R1	R2	R1	R2	R1	R2	Pos.	Pts
2016	Ducati	AUS	AUS	THA	THA	SPA	SPA	NED	NED	ITA	ITA	MAL	MAL	GBR	GBR	ITA; 18	ITA; 17	USA; DNS	USA; DNS	GER	GER	FRA	FRA	SPA	SPA	QAT	QAT	NC	0
2017	Ducati	AUS	AUS	THA	THA	SPA	SPA	NED	NED	ITA	ITA	GBR	GBR	ITA; Ret	ITA; Ret	USA	USA	GER	GER	POR	POR	FRA	FRA	SPA	SPA	QAT	QAT	NC	0
