= Ten Kate Racing =

Motorcycle racing team

(Netherlands) Ten Kate Racing
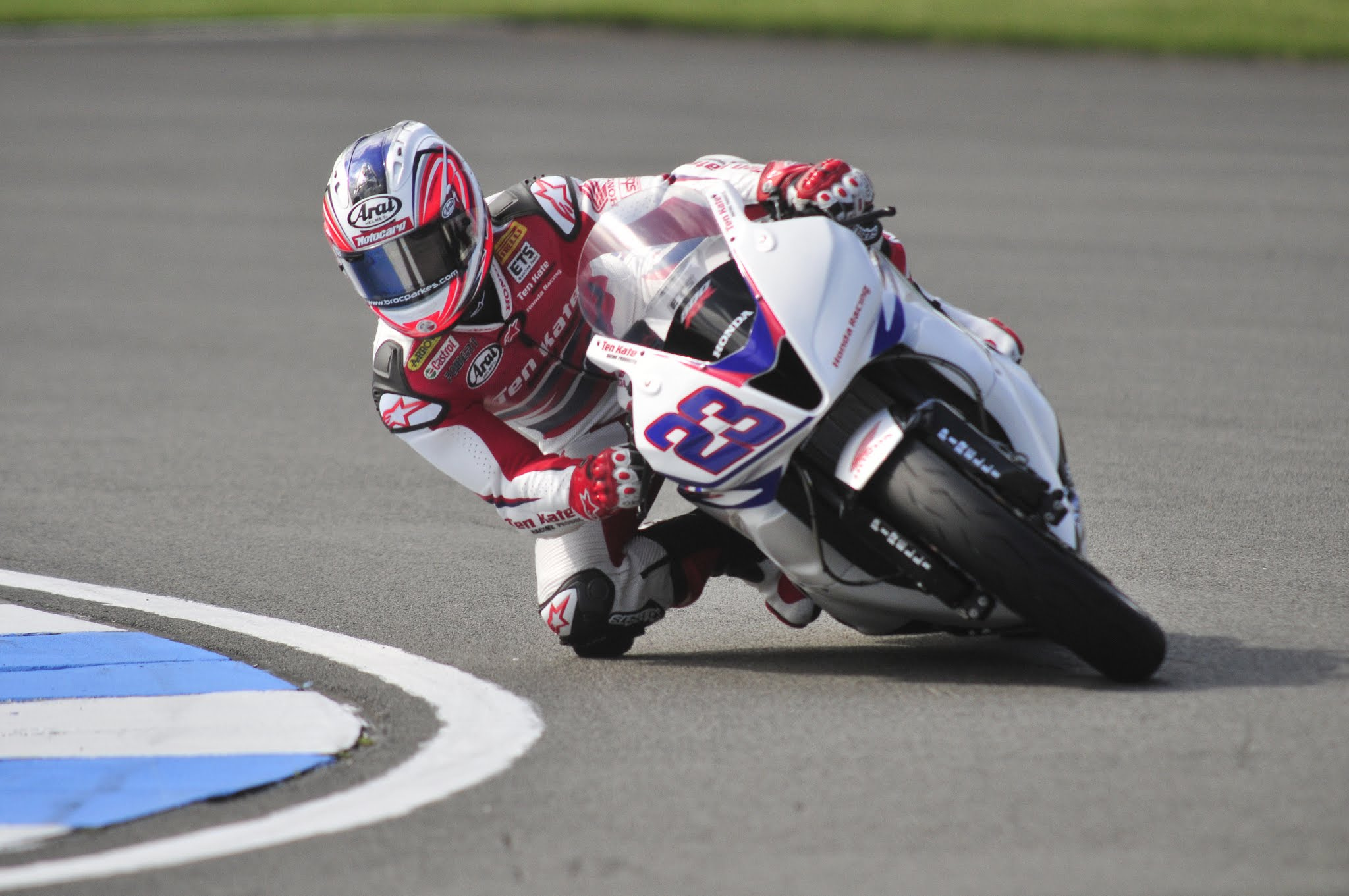
- 2025 name: Pata Yamaha Ten Kate Racing
- Base: Nieuwleusen, Netherlands
- Team principal/s: Ronald ten Kate; Kervin Bos
- Race riders: Supersport World Championship: (Japan) Yuki Okamoto (Turkey) Can Öncü
- Motorcycle: Yamaha YZF-R6; Yamaha YZF-R9; Yamaha YZF-R1
- Tyres: Pirelli
- Riders' Championships: Supersport World Championship: 2002: Fabien Foret; 2003: Chris Vermeulen; 2004: Karl Muggeridge; 2005: Sébastien Charpentier; 2006: Sébastien Charpentier; 2007: Kenan Sofuoğlu; 2008: Andrew Pitt; 2010: Kenan Sofuoğlu; 2014: Michael van der Mark; 2021: Dominique Aegerter; 2022: Dominique Aegerter; 2025: Stefano Manzi; Superbike World Championship: 2007: James Toseland

Ten Kate Racing is a motorcycle racing team competing in the Supersport World Championship, currently fielding Can Öncü and Yuki Okamoto. They previously competed in the Superbike World Championship with 2019 rider Loris Baz, and previously with Gulf Althea Racing BMW Motorrad.

The re-built team participated in a part-season from June.

Ten Kate had the official backing of Honda for 18 years until late 2018, being their presence in both World Superbikes and World Supersport series, with reports of Honda's sudden withdrawal causing team bankruptcy.

Ten Kate raced a team as the Red Bull Honda World Superbike Team, a squad sponsored by Red Bull, using Honda superbike motorcycles in the Superbike World Championship.

== History ==
=== Foundation ===
Gerrit ten Kate was a full-time motocross rider, who like many undertook his own mechanics. After semi-retirement from his own career, he guided his nephew Ronald ten Kate through regional motocross series to fourth place in the Dutch national championship. Having founded a workshop undertaking mechanics for other riders during his career, it was noticed that Ronald's bike was fast, which resulted in Gerrit expanding his workshop to the point where he was selling and maintaining 50/60 bikes per annum.

In 1993, Gerrit gave up his own motocross activities to concentrate on developing his motorcycle dealership Ten Kate Motorcycles in Nieuwleusen, near Zwolle in the north of the Netherlands. Soon after foundation, local road racing rider Harry van Beek came to the showroom looking for help, so Gerrit fixed it. Van Beek got a wildcard entry in the European Superstock round at Hockenheim, where he found he had the fastest bike. As a result, from 1994 Ten Kate entered road racing maintenance.

=== Road Racing ===
From 1995, the team entered its own team in regional Dutch road racing. Managed by Ronald ten Kate, each season Ten Kate Racing has increased in scope and size, and now takes a team of 28 - including technicians, administrative staff and four riders - to contest the World Superbike and Supersport champ:

With four engine builders, we are always looking to increase the performance of the motors. But there is a lot more to it than that. I would much rather have five horsepower less in a good chassis than five horsepower more that cannot be used. For that reason we have brought data-logging and suspension specialists into the team over the past few years to help us develop the whole package.

The team first entered the Supersport World Championship full-time in 2001, using Honda CBR600F4i motorcycles. In 2002 Ten Kate rider Fabien Foret won the championship, Honda's first in Supersport.

The team went on to win all of the last six Supersport World Championships using the Honda CBR600RR. In 2003 Chris Vermeulen won the title, followed by Karl Muggeridge in 2004, Sébastien Charpentier in 2005, who retained his title in 2006, the first rider ever to do so, and Kenan Sofuoğlu who won the championship in 2007. Also in 2008 Ten Kate wins with Andrew Pitt.

In 2004 the team also moved up to the Superbike World Championship using the Honda CBR1000RR and Chris Vermeulen as its single rider. Despite being a privateer entry with no support from Honda who had withdrawn its support from the Superbike World Championship, Chris Vermeulen finished fourth in the championship with four wins and was in contention for the title until the final round of the season.

The team expanded into a two motorcycles operation in 2005 with Karl Muggeridge joining Chris Vermeulen. Vermeulen managed 6 wins and finished the championship runner-up while Muggeridge had a poorer season and finished 11th.

Chris Vermeulen moved to MotoGP in 2006 and was replaced by 2004 Superbike World Champion James Toseland. Toseland finished the season runner-up with 3 race wins, while teammate Karl Muggeridge once again had a poorer season finishing 12th.

In 2007 James Toseland was joined in the team by Roberto Rolfo. Toseland got 8 race wins and won the championship in the final race of the season by a margin of 2 points. Rolfo finished 8th overall.

For 2008 the team continues to use Honda motorcycles, CBR1000RR in Superbikes, and CBR600RR for Supersport.

With James Toseland moving to MotoGP, former MotoGP rider Carlos Checa and 2 times British Superbike Champion Ryuichi Kiyonari join the team, while 2007 Supersport World Champion Kenan Sofuoğlu will ride a third motorcycle under the banner of Hannspree Ten Kate Honda Jr.

Kenan Sofuoğlu and 2001 Supersport World Champion Andrew Pitt ride for the team in the 2009 Supersport World Championship.

Honda has announced its plans for the 2013 World Superbike and World Supersport championships, which include a new four-rider line-up, a comprehensive technical development and testing programme and a new title sponsor.

In the World Superbike championship, current rider Jonathan Rea has signed with the team once more and will team-up with fellow Briton Leon Haslam on the Honda CBR1000RR Fireblade. In the World Supersport championship, Italian Lorenzo Zanetti will ride Honda's CBR600RR alongside Michael van der Mark from the Netherlands.

Italian snack manufacturer Pata is the new title sponsor of the reinvigorated squad which will be known as the Pata Honda World Superbike and Pata Honda World Supersport teams. Both groups will once again be run by the Netherlands-based Ten Kate organisation.

For Jonathan Rea, 2013 marked a fifth year on Honda's CBR1000RR Fireblade and his sixth season of racing with Ten Kate. The 25-year-old enjoyed a busy 2012, combining his World Superbike duties – including wins at Assen and Donington Park - with winning the Suzuka 8-hour race.

More recently, Northern Irishman Rea has replaced the injured Casey Stoner in the Repsol Honda MotoGP team, riding back-to-back Grands Prix with the final three rounds of World Superbike.

Ten Kate had the backing of the Honda factory until the 2019 season

Haslam, 29, returns to Honda's CBR machinery after a three-year absence to continue a strong family link to the Japanese manufacturer. It was begun by his father, Ron, who won Formula 1 world championships and raced with Honda in 500cc Grands Prix.

With his own 250cc and 500cc GP experience, the younger Haslam, from Derbyshire in the UK, has been racing in the World Superbike championship since 2009 and was runner-up in the 2010 series. He has amassed a total of 28 podium finishes, including three race wins.

Lorenzo Zanetti is from Brescia in Italy and has been in the World Superbike paddock for three years, but began his career with Honda, winning the RS125 GP Cup in Italy in 2004. The 25-year-old finished third in the 2011 Superstock 1000 Championship and has spent the 2012 season competing in the World Superbike series with a best result of eighth last time out at the Nurburgring in Germany.

Michael van der Mark, the 19-year-old from Gouda in the Netherlands began his career racing in the Dutch 125cc Junior Cup and has spent the last five years on Honda machinery.

== World Superbike ==
=== Results ===
(key) (Races in bold indicate pole position; races in italics indicate fastest lap)

Year	Team	Bike	Tyres	No.	Riders	1		2		3		4		5		6		7		8		9		10		11		12		13		14		RC	Points	TC	Points	MC	Points
Year	Team	Bike	Tyres	No.	Riders	R1	R2	R1	R2	R1	R2	R1	R2	R1	R2	R1	R2	R1	R2	R1	R2	R1	R2	R1	R2	R1	R2	R1	R2	R1	R2	R1	R2	RC	Points	TC	Points	MC	Points
2004	Ten Kate Honda	Honda CBR1000RR	P			SPA	SPA	AUS	AUS	ITA	ITA	ITA	ITA	GER	GER	GBR	GBR	USA	USA	GBR	GBR	NED	NED	ITA	ITA	FRA	FRA												
2004	Ten Kate Honda	Honda CBR1000RR	P	17	(Australia) Chris Vermeulen	12	5	2	2	5	12	4	DSQ	15	8	2	1	1	1	4	3	5	1	2	6	Ret	Ret							4th	282	—N/a	—N/a	2nd	289
2005	Winston Ten Kate Honda	Honda CBR1000RR	P			QAT	QAT	AUS	AUS	SPA	SPA	ITA	ITA	GBR	GBR	ITA	ITA	CZE	CZE	GBR	GBR	NED	NED	GER	GER	ITA	ITA	FRA	FRA										
2005	Winston Ten Kate Honda	Honda CBR1000RR	P	31	(Australia) Karl Muggeridge	9	Ret	8	Ret	Ret	Ret	6	4	10	10	10	7	13	9	6	Ret	9	8	Ret	5	Ret	C	4	DNS					11th	124	—N/a	—N/a	2nd	403
2005	Winston Ten Kate Honda	Honda CBR1000RR	P	77	(Australia) Chris Vermeulen	8	4	3	4	2	2	Ret	1	4	4	2	2	8	3	4	3	**1**	**1**	1	2	**1**	**C**	**1**	**Ret**					2nd	379	—N/a	—N/a	2nd	403
2006	Winston Ten Kate Honda	Honda CBR1000RR	P			QAT	QAT	AUS	AUS	SPA	SPA	ITA	ITA	GBR	GBR	ITA	ITA	CZE	CZE	GBR	GBR	NED	NED	GER	GER	ITA	ITA	FRA	FRA										
2006	Winston Ten Kate Honda	Honda CBR1000RR	P	31	(Australia) Karl Muggeridge	12	9	Ret	Ret			6	7	8	9	11	14	11	7	Ret	Ret	9	13	6	5	8	8	Ret	6					12th	123	—N/a	—N/a	2nd	414
2006	Winston Ten Kate Honda	Honda CBR1000RR	P	52	(United Kingdom) James Toseland	1	4	3	2	9	11	Ret	5	3	3	**2**	**8**	2	5	2	5	10	9	9	1	2	5	1	3					2nd	336	—N/a	—N/a	2nd	414
2006	Winston Ten Kate Honda	Honda CBR1000RR	P	200	(Italy) Giovanni Bussei					18	20																							NC	0	—N/a	—N/a	2nd	414
2007	HANNspree Ten Kate Honda	Honda CBR1000RR	P			QAT	QAT	AUS	AUS	GBR	GBR	SPA	SPA	NED	NED	ITA	ITA	GBR	GBR	ITA	ITA	CZE	CZE	GBR	GBR	GER	GER	ITA	ITA	FRA	FRA								
2007	HANNspree Ten Kate Honda	Honda CBR1000RR	P	44	(Italy) Roberto Rolfo	7	Ret	11	10	9	7	10	12	9	5	Ret	4	4	C	5	8	5	5	6	11	5	7	Ret	5	10	7			8th	192	2nd	607	2nd	439
2007	HANNspree Ten Kate Honda	Honda CBR1000RR	P	52	(United Kingdom) James Toseland	2	1	2	1	1	Ret	5	1	**1**	**2**	4	2	8	C	4	6	1	2	1	1	9	4	3	11	**7**	**6**			1st	415	2nd	607	2nd	439
2008	HANNspree Ten Kate Honda	Honda CBR1000RR	P			QAT	QAT	AUS	AUS	SPA	SPA	NED	NED	ITA	ITA	USA	USA	GER	GER	ITA	ITA	CZE	CZE	GBR	GBR	GBR	GBR	ITA	ITA	FRA	FRA	POR	POR						
2008	HANNspree Ten Kate Honda	Honda CBR1000RR	P	7	(Spain) Carlos Checa	6	11	6	2	5	3	2	3	8	Ret	**1**	**1**	5	5	5	8	8	Ret	6	8	Ret	9	5	5	7	4	2	7	4th	313	4th	567	3rd	415
2008	HANNspree Ten Kate Honda	Honda CBR1000RR	P	23	(Japan) Ryuichi Kiyonari	22	19	9	6	Ret	4	7	Ret	6	3	10	7	12	11	14	13	5	6	1	1	Ret	1	Ret	13			8	11	9th	206	4th	567	3rd	415
2008	HANNspree Ten Kate Honda	Honda CBR1000RR	P	32	(Austria) Martin Bauer																									17	Ret			NC	0	4th	567	3rd	415
2008	HANNspree Ten Kate Honda Jr.	Honda CBR1000RR	P	54	(Turkey) Kenan Sofuoğlu	12	10	14	11	12	15	12	19	DNS	DNS	12	14	Ret	21	18	Ret	10	10	13	17	Ret	DNS	Ret	Ret	9	19			18th	54	4th	567	3rd	415
2008	HANNspree Ten Kate Honda Jr.	Honda CBR1000RR	P	65	(United Kingdom) Jonathan Rea																											4	15	26th	14	4th	567	3rd	415
2009	HANNspree Ten Kate Honda	Honda CBR1000RR	P			AUS	AUS	QAT	QAT	SPA	SPA	NED	NED	ITA	ITA	RSA	RSA	USA	USA	ITA	ITA	GBR	GBR	CZE	CZE	GER	GER	ITA	ITA	FRA	FRA	POR	POR						
2009	HANNspree Ten Kate Honda	Honda CBR1000RR	P	7	(Spain) Carlos Checa	12	13	5	13	Ret	6	Ret	7	9	10	6	6	2	Ret	11	5	11	Ret	2	5	3	3	Ret	10	6	9	7	Ret	7th	209	3rd	524	3rd	431
2009	HANNspree Ten Kate Honda	Honda CBR1000RR	P	65	(United Kingdom) Jonathan Rea	5	9	12	8	Ret	13	7	5	5	4	4	3	5	3	7	1	7	15	3	4	4	1	7	6	Ret	3	2	3	5th	315	3rd	524	3rd	431
2009	Ten Kate Honda Racing	Honda CBR1000RR	P	9	(Japan) Ryuichi Kiyonari	Ret	23	8	4	12	9	15	Ret	3	3	12	13	4	5	Ret	14	10	7	13	13	14	7	5	17	Ret	DNS	DNS	DNS	11th	141	10th	141	3rd	431
2010	HANNspree Ten Kate Honda	Honda CBR1000RR	P			AUS	AUS	POR	POR	SPA	SPA	NED	NED	ITA	ITA	RSA	RSA	USA	USA	ITA	ITA	CZE	CZE	GBR	GBR	GER	GER	ITA	ITA	FRA	FRA								
2010	HANNspree Ten Kate Honda	Honda CBR1000RR	P	65	(United Kingdom) Jonathan Rea	4	6	3	Ret	6	5	**1**	**1**	Ret	Ret	5	2	14	8	13	12	1	2	2	2	1	2	DNS	DNS	12	DNS			4th	292	6th	346	5th	313
2010	HANNspree Ten Kate Honda	Honda CBR1000RR	P	76	(Germany) Max Neukirchner	12	16	Ret	15	13	17	20	9	12	12	19	17	12	12	14	14	Ret	Ret	11	Ret	Ret	15	14	12	13	12			18th	54	6th	346	5th	313
2011	Castrol Honda	Honda CBR1000RR	P			AUS	AUS	GBR	GBR	NED	NED	ITA	ITA	USA	USA	ITA	ITA	SPA	SPA	CZE	CZE	GBR	GBR	GER	GER	ITA	ITA	FRA	FRA	POR	POR								
2011	Castrol Honda	Honda CBR1000RR	P	4	(United Kingdom) Jonathan Rea	12	4	5	6	1	3	6	Ret	Ret	11	DNS	DNS							10	4	1	Ret	**Ret**	**Ret**	**3**	**3**			9th	170	6th	220	6th	194
2011	Castrol Honda	Honda CBR1000RR	P	22	(United Kingdom) Alex Lowes															15	Ret	Ret	Ret											33rd	1	6th	220	6th	194
2011	Castrol Honda	Honda CBR1000RR	P	31	(Australia) Karl Muggeridge																									18	17			NC	0	6th	220	6th	194
2011	Castrol Honda	Honda CBR1000RR	P	32	(Italy) Fabrizio Lai																	Ret	16											34th	0 (1)	6th	220	6th	194
2011	Castrol Honda	Honda CBR1000RR	P	100	(Japan) Makoto Tamada																			17	Ret									NC	0	6th	220	6th	194
2011	Castrol Honda	Honda CBR1000RR	P	111	(Spain) Rubén Xaus	16	10	12	10	8	14	15	12	Ret	18	11	8	16	Ret	Ret	DNS					17	11	DNS	DNS					17th	49	6th	220	6th	194
2012	Honda World Superbike Team	Honda CBR1000RR	P			AUS	AUS	ITA	ITA	NED	NED	ITA	ITA	GBR	GBR	USA	USA	ITA	ITA	SPA	SPA	CZE	CZE	GBR	GBR	RUS	RUS	GER	GER	POR	POR	FRA	FRA						
2012	Honda World Superbike Team	Honda CBR1000RR	P	4	(Japan) Hiroshi Aoyama	8	9	18	Ret	12	13	C	11	17	10	17	DNS	16	12	14	15	Ret	Ret	13	14	13	Ret	10	15	8	Ret	Ret	14	18th	61.5	5th	340	5th	293.5
2012	Honda World Superbike Team	Honda CBR1000RR	P	65	(United Kingdom) Jonathan Rea	7	4	9	5	Ret	1	C	6	4	1	4	2	5	2	16	5	Ret	12	4	9	Ret	7	Ret	4	6	2	13	2	5th	278.5	5th	340	5th	293.5
2013	Pata Honda World Superbike	Honda CBR1000RR	P			AUS	AUS	SPA	SPA	NED	NED	ITA	ITA	GBR	GBR	POR	POR	ITA	ITA	RUS	RUS	GBR	GBR	GER	GER	TUR	TUR	USA	USA	FRA	FRA	SPA	SPA						
2013	Pata Honda World Superbike	Honda CBR1000RR	P	65	(United Kingdom) Jonathan Rea	8	8	4	15	2	4	8	Ret	4	11	Ret	3	Ret	2	4	C	1	4	Ret	DNS									9th	176	5th	301	5th	236
2013	Pata Honda World Superbike	Honda CBR1000RR	P	72	(Japan) Kousuke Akiyoshi							14	Ret																					40th	2	5th	301	5th	236
2013	Pata Honda World Superbike	Honda CBR1000RR	P	84	(Italy) Michel Fabrizio																					10	10	13	10	7	Ret	17	14	7th	32 (188)	5th	301	5th	236
2013	Pata Honda World Superbike	Honda CBR1000RR	P	91	(United Kingdom) Leon Haslam	7	10	9	9	DNS	DNS			DNS	DNS	Ret	DNS	10	9	Ret	C	7	Ret	7	13	9	8	Ret	11	8	Ret	Ret	Ret	13th	91	5th	301	5th	236
2014	Pata Honda World Superbike	Honda CBR1000RR	P			AUS	AUS	SPA	SPA	NED	NED	ITA	ITA	GBR	GBR	MAL	MAL	ITA	ITA	POR	POR	USA	USA	SPA	SPA	FRA	FRA	QAT	QAT										
2014	Pata Honda World Superbike	Honda CBR1000RR	P	65	(United Kingdom) Jonathan Rea	6	5	3	5	3	1	**1**	**1**	6	6	6	6	7	5	5	1	6	3	4	5	3	Ret	4	2					3rd	334	3rd	521	3rd	350
2014	Pata Honda World Superbike	Honda CBR1000RR	P	91	(United Kingdom) Leon Haslam	Ret	6	9	8	8	5	10	8	8	7	7	11	10	12	11	5	7	7	7	8	6	3	11	10					7th	187	3rd	521	3rd	350
2015	Pata Honda World Superbike Team	Honda CBR1000RR SP	P			AUS	AUS	THA	THA	SPA	SPA	NED	NED	ITA	ITA	GBR	GBR	POR	POR	ITA	ITA	USA	USA	MAL	MAL	SPA	SPA	FRA	FRA	QAT	QAT								
2015	Pata Honda World Superbike Team	Honda CBR1000RR SP	P	1	(France) Sylvain Guintoli	7	5	5	6	9	Ret	8	7	5	Ret	8	8	5	6	9	9	7	Ret	4	4	10	9	3	6	10	5			6th	218	4th	412	4th	273
2015	Pata Honda World Superbike Team	Honda CBR1000RR SP	P	60	(Netherlands) Michael van der Mark	5	Ret	Ret	7	Ret	8	3	3	9	Ret	DSQ	Ret	9	5	10	10	8	7	Ret	5	3	13	4	4	5	4			7th	194	4th	412	4th	273
2016	Honda World Superbike Team	Honda CBR1000RR SP	P			AUS	AUS	THA	THA	SPA	SPA	NED	NED	ITA	ITA	MAL	MAL	GBR	GBR	ITA	ITA	USA	USA	GER	GER	FRA	FRA	SPA	SPA	QAT	QAT								
2016	Honda World Superbike Team	Honda CBR1000RR SP	P	60	(Netherlands) Michael van der Mark	3	2	**3**	**4**	Ret	7	Ret	3	7	9	7	6	8	8	3	10	4	7	6	8	2	5	5	6	9	11			4th	267	3rd	515	3rd	342
2016	Honda World Superbike Team	Honda CBR1000RR SP	P	69	(United States) Nicky Hayden	9	4	Ret	5	6	Ret	3	6	9	8	8	1	5	6	Ret	6	3	5	3	10	Ret	9	4	4	5	7			5th	248	3rd	515	3rd	342
2017	Red Bull Honda World Superbike Team	Honda CBR1000RR	P			AUS	AUS	THA	THA	SPA	SPA	NED	NED	ITA	ITA	GBR	GBR	ITA	ITA	USA	USA	GER	GER	POR	POR	FRA	FRA	SPA	SPA	QAT	QAT								
2017	Red Bull Honda World Superbike Team	Honda CBR1000RR	P	6	(Germany) Stefan Bradl	15	15	10	Ret	9	12	6	10	10	14	Ret	11	NC	10	11	11	DNS	13	Ret	DNS									14th	67	8th	142	7th	113
2017	Red Bull Honda World Superbike Team	Honda CBR1000RR	P	34	(Italy) Davide Giugliano																	Ret	17			8	11	Ret	17	Ret	DNS			26th	13	8th	142	7th	113
2017	Red Bull Honda World Superbike Team	Honda CBR1000RR	P	45	(United States) Jake Gagne															15	15					Ret	12			12	12			24th	14	8th	142	7th	113
2017	Red Bull Honda World Superbike Team	Honda CBR1000RR	P	69	(United States) Nicky Hayden	11	Ret	9	7	10	Ret	14	9	Ret	12																			17th	40	8th	142	7th	113
2017	Red Bull Honda World Superbike Team	Honda CBR1000RR	P	72	(Japan) Takumi Takahashi																			15	10			16	15					29th	8	8th	142	7th	113
2018	Red Bull Honda World Superbike Team	Honda CBR1000RR	P			AUS	AUS	THA	THA	SPA	SPA	NED	NED	ITA	ITA	GBR	GBR	CZE	CZE	USA	USA	ITA	ITA	POR	POR	FRA	FRA	ARG	ARG	QAT	QAT								
2018	Red Bull Honda World Superbike Team	Honda CBR1000RR	P	2	(United Kingdom) Leon Camier	7	6	4	6	Ret	DNS			WD	WD	10	8	9	7	Ret	13	9	10	Ret	14	11	9	10	Ret	Ret	C			12th	108	6th	172	5th	151
2018	Red Bull Honda World Superbike Team	Honda CBR1000RR	P	20	(Australia) Jason O'Halloran									Ret	DNS																			NC	0	6th	172	5th	151
2018	Red Bull Honda World Superbike Team	Honda CBR1000RR	P	45	(United States) Jake Gagne	12	13	18	14	12	12	DNS	DNS	16	Ret	16	13	Ret	12	10	9	14	14	13	12	13	16	Ret	10	9	C			17th	64	6th	172	5th	151

Year	Team	Bike	Tyres	No.	Riders	1			2			3			4			5			6			7			8			9			10			11			12			13			RC	Points	TC	Points	MC	Points
Year	Team	Bike	Tyres	No.	Riders	R1	SR	R2	R1	SR	R2	R1	SR	R2	R1	SR	R2	R1	SR	R2	R1	SR	R2	R1	SR	R2	R1	SR	R2	R1	SR	R2	R1	SR	R2	R1	SR	R2	R1	SR	R2	R1	SR	R2	RC	Points	TC	Points	MC	Points
2019	Ten Kate Racing Yamaha	Yamaha YZF-R1	**P**			AUS	AUS	AUS	THA	THA	THA	SPA	SPA	SPA	NED	NED	NED	ITA	ITA	ITA	SPA	SPA	SPA	ITA	ITA	ITA	GBR	GBR	GBR	USA	USA	USA	POR	POR	POR	FRA	FRA	FRA	ARG	ARG	ARG	QAT	QAT	QAT						
2019	Ten Kate Racing Yamaha	Yamaha YZF-R1	**P**	76	(France) Loris Baz																12	Ret	9	4	12	12	4	5	6	8	7	7	16	9	6	4	7	5	DNS	Ret	12	7	7	8	10th	138	7th	138	3rd	451
2020	Ten Kate Racing Yamaha	Yamaha YZF-R1	**P**			AUS	AUS	AUS	SPA	SPA	SPA	POR	POR	POR	SPA	SPA	SPA	SPA	SPA	SPA	SPA	SPA	SPA	FRA	FRA	FRA	POR	POR	POR																					
2020	Ten Kate Racing Yamaha	Yamaha YZF-R1	**P**	76	(France) Loris Baz	7	7	8	5	4	17	6	3	Ret	7	9	Ret	12	11	8	14	3	10	2	6	2	9	Ret	Ret																8th	142	8th	142	3rd	330

== World Supersport ==
=== Results ===
(key) (Races in bold indicate pole position; races in italics indicate fastest lap)

Year	Team	Bike	Tyres	No.	Riders	1	2	3	4	5	6	7	8	9	10	11	12	13	14	RC	Points	TC	Points	MC	Points
1999	Ten Kate Arbizu	Honda CBR600F				RSA	GBR	SPA	ITA	GER	ITA	USA	GBR	AUT	NED	GER									
1999	Ten Kate Arbizu	Honda CBR600F		32	(Spain) José David de Gea	9	Ret	Ret	15	20	17		14							26th	10	—N/a	—N/a	4th	112
1999	Ten Kate Arbizu	Honda CBR600F		76	(Australia) Karl Muggeridge										4	Ret				23rd	13	—N/a	—N/a	4th	112
2000	Ten Kate Honda	Honda CBR600F				AUS	JPN	GBR	ITA	GER	ITA	SPA	GBR	NED	GER	GBR									
2000	Ten Kate Honda	Honda CBR600F		31	(Australia) Karl Muggeridge	Ret	6	**Ret**	3	10	4	Ret	**2**	13	**2**	1				5th	113	—N/a	—N/a	4th	155
2000	Ten Kate Honda	Honda CBR600F		33	(South Africa) Greg Dreyer	17	Ret													NC	0	—N/a	—N/a	4th	155
2000	Ten Kate Honda	Honda CBR600F		39	(Australia) Nigel Arnold			Ret	Ret	21	Ret	DNS								NC	0	—N/a	—N/a	4th	155
2000	Ten Kate Honda	Honda CBR600F		79	(United Kingdom) Phil Giles											17				NC	0	—N/a	—N/a	4th	155
2000	Ten Kate Honda	Honda CBR600F		83	(United Kingdom) James Ellison								23	15	11					33rd	6	—N/a	—N/a	4th	155
2001	Ten Kate Honda	Honda CBR600F	P			SPA	AUS	JPN	ITA	GBR	GER	ITA	GBR	GER	NED	ITA									
2001	Ten Kate Honda	Honda CBR600F	P	7	(Spain) Pere Riba	1	5	4	Ret	12	Ret	Ret	6	2	Ret	5				6th	94	—N/a	—N/a	2nd	184
2001	Ten Kate Honda	Honda CBR600F	P	99	(France) Fabien Foret	**15**	19	8	Ret	11	**Ret**	4	9	**1**	10	1				8th	90	—N/a	—N/a	2nd	184
2002	Ten Kate Honda	Honda CBR600F	P			SPA	AUS	RSA	JPN	ITA	GBR	GER	ITA	GBR	GER	NED	ITA								
2002	Ten Kate Honda	Honda CBR600F	P	9	(United Kingdom) Iain MacPherson	Ret	8	8	Ret	8	5	10	Ret	4	Ret	2	7			9th	83	—N/a	—N/a	2nd	209
2002	Ten Kate Honda	Honda CBR600F	P	99	(France) Fabien Foret	**1**	9	5	3	1	**7**	**DSQ**	**1**	**2**	6	1	**4**			1st	186	—N/a	—N/a	2nd	209
2003	Ten Kate Honda	Honda CBR600RR				SPA	AUS	JPN	ITA	GER	GBR	ITA	GBR	NED	ITA	FRA									
2003	Ten Kate Honda	Honda CBR600RR	P	7	(Australia) Chris Vermeulen	2	**1**	5	1	1	1	Ret	6	**2**	2	**2**				1st	201	—N/a	—N/a	1st	247
2003	Ten Kate Honda	Honda CBR600RR	D	23	(Australia) Broc Parkes											Ret				13th	0 (47)	—N/a	—N/a	1st	247
2003	Ten Kate Honda	Honda CBR600RR	P	31	(Australia) Karl Muggeridge	6	7	6	**Ret**	**15**	3	Ret	4	1	**1**	1				4th	134	—N/a	—N/a	1st	247
2004	Ten Kate Honda	Honda CBR600RR	P			SPA	AUS	SMR	ITA	GER	GBR	GBR	NED	ITA	FRA										
2004	Ten Kate Honda	Honda CBR600RR	P	23	(Australia) Broc Parkes	Ret	4	Ret	2	2	3	4	4	2	**2**					2nd	135	—N/a	—N/a	1st	212
2004	Ten Kate Honda	Honda CBR600RR	P	31	(Australia) Karl Muggeridge	**8**	**12**	1	**1**	**1**	**2**	**1**	**1**	**1**	1					1st	207	—N/a	—N/a	1st	212
2005	Winston Ten Kate Honda	Honda CBR600RR	P			QAT	AUS	SPA	ITA	GBR	ITA	CZE	GBR	NED	GER	ITA	FRA								
2005	Winston Ten Kate Honda	Honda CBR600RR	P	16	(France) Sébastien Charpentier	**2**	**1**	**1**	**2**	**1**	1	**1**	**1**	**2**	**Ret**	DNS				1st	210	—N/a	—N/a	1st	270
2005	Winston Ten Kate Honda	Honda CBR600RR	P	21	(Japan) Katsuaki Fujiwara	1	4	2	1	9	3		6	5	4	WD	7			3rd	149	—N/a	—N/a	1st	270
2005	Winston Ten Kate Honda	Honda CBR600RR	P	81	(Netherlands) Arie Vos												11			18th	5 (17)	—N/a	—N/a	1st	270
2005	Winston Ten Kate Honda	Honda CBR600RR	P	83	(United Kingdom) Craig Jones							6								16th	10 (18)	—N/a	—N/a	1st	270
2005	Ten Kate Kobutex Honda	Honda CBR600RR	P	36	(Slovenia) Luka Nedog							27								NC	0	—N/a	—N/a	1st	270
2006	Winston Ten Kate Honda	Honda CBR600RR	P			QAT	AUS	SPA	ITA	GBR	ITA	CZE	GBR	NED	GER	ITA	FRA								
2006	Winston Ten Kate Honda	Honda CBR600RR	P	16	(France) Sébastien Charpentier	**1**	**1**	**1**	**3**	**1**		11	6	**4**	Ret	**1**	**1**			1st	194	—N/a	—N/a	1st	277
2006	Winston Ten Kate Honda	Honda CBR600RR	P	54	(Turkey) Kenan Sofuoğlu	3	Ret	Ret	5	20	8	3	3	1	1	2	2			3rd	157	—N/a	—N/a	1st	277
2006	Winston Ten Kate Honda	Honda CBR600RR	P	28	(Netherlands) Arie Vos						14									28th	13	—N/a	—N/a	1st	277
2006	J&E Sport Ten Kate Honda	Honda CBR600RR	P	28	(Netherlands) Arie Vos									5						28th	13	—N/a	—N/a	1st	277
2007	HANNspree Ten Kate Honda	Honda CBR600RR	P			QAT	AUS	GBR	SPA	NED	ITA	GBR	SMR	CZE	GBR	GER	ITA	FRA							
2007	HANNspree Ten Kate Honda	Honda CBR600RR	P	15	(Australia) Andrew Pitt				2	2										17th	40	—N/a	—N/a	1st	296
2007	HANNspree Ten Kate Honda	Honda CBR600RR	P	16	(France) Sébastien Charpentier	Ret	4			6	Ret	**Ret**	10	8	**DSQ**	**9**	9	Ret		11th	51	—N/a	—N/a	1st	296
2007	HANNspree Ten Kate Honda	Honda CBR600RR	P	54	(Turkey) Kenan Sofuoğlu	1	2	1	**1**	**1**	**1**	Ret	3	**1**	2	2	1	**1**		1st	276	—N/a	—N/a	1st	296
2008	HANNspree Ten Kate Honda	Honda CBR600RR	P			QAT	AUS	ESP	NED	ITA	GER	ITA	CZE	GBR	GBR	ITA	FRA	POR							
2008	HANNspree Ten Kate Honda	Honda CBR600RR	P	54	(Turkey) Kenan Sofuoğlu													**1**		19th	25	—N/a	—N/a	1st	315
2008	HANNspree Ten Kate Honda	Honda CBR600RR	P	65	(United Kingdom) Jonathan Rea	Ret	5	6	2	Ret	6	3	1	1	3	1	10			2nd	164	—N/a	—N/a	1st	315
2008	HANNspree Ten Kate Honda	Honda CBR600RR	P	88	(Australia) Andrew Pitt	Ret	**1**	**19**	1	4	1	1	2	3	2	Ret	1	2		1st	214	—N/a	—N/a	1st	315
2009	HANNspree Ten Kate Honda	Honda CBR600RR	P			AUS	QAT	SPA	NED	ITA	RSA	USA	ITA	GBR	CZE	GER	ITA	FRA	POR						
2009	HANNspree Ten Kate Honda	Honda CBR600RR	P	1	(Australia) Andrew Pitt	2	2	13	Ret	5	6	7	Ret	10	10	7	6	6	11	6th	119	—N/a	—N/a	1st	297
2009	HANNspree Ten Kate Honda	Honda CBR600RR	P	54	(Turkey) Kenan Sofuoğlu	**1**	4	3	5	9	5	1	Ret	4	9	Ret	1	3	2	3rd	189	—N/a	—N/a	1st	297
2010	HANNspree Ten Kate Honda	Honda CBR600RR	P			AUS	POR	SPA	NED	ITA	RSA	USA	SMR	CZE	GBR	GER	ITA	FRA							
2010	HANNspree Ten Kate Honda	Honda CBR600RR	P	34	(South Africa) Ronan Quarmby										18					NC	0	—N/a	—N/a	1st	320
2010	HANNspree Ten Kate Honda	Honda CBR600RR	P	51	(Italy) Michele Pirro	Ret	3	11	Ret	4	4	5	**Ret**	Ret		8	1	8		5th	99	—N/a	—N/a	1st	320
2010	HANNspree Ten Kate Honda	Honda CBR600RR	P	54	(Turkey) Kenan Sofuoğlu	3	1	2	**3**	**2**	2	**1**	3	1	2	2	**2**	**2**		1st	263	—N/a	—N/a	1st	320
2010	HANNspree Ten Kate Honda	Honda CBR600RR	P	121	(France) Florian Marino													12		29th	4	—N/a	—N/a	1st	320
2011	HANNspree Ten Kate Honda	Honda CBR600RR	P			AUS	GBR	NED	ITA	SMR	SPA	CZE	GBR	GER	ITA	FRA	POR								
2011	HANNspree Ten Kate Honda	Honda CBR600RR	P	21	(France) Florian Marino	7	8	Ret	7	11	10	9	9	9	4	9	5			8th	89	3rd	237	2nd	230
2011	HANNspree Ten Kate Honda	Honda CBR600RR	P	99	(France) Fabien Foret	Ret	DNS	2	3	2	7	**2**	3	**6**	1	8	12			3rd	148	3rd	237	2nd	230
2012	Ten Kate Racing Products	Honda CBR600RR	P			AUS	ITA	NED	ITA	GBR	ITA	SPA	CZE	GBR	RUS	GER	POR	FRA							
2012	Ten Kate Racing Products	Honda CBR600RR	P	23	(Australia) Broc Parkes	**3**	20	4	Ret	4	5	4	3	3	5	4	**4**	**27**		5th	135	6th	135	1st	287
2012	Ten Kate Racing Products	Honda CBR600RR	P	60	(Netherlands) Michael van der Mark										DNS					NC	0	—N/a	—N/a	1st	287
2012	Ten Kate Racing Products	Honda CBR600RR	P	117	(Portugal) Miguel Praia											16	17	22		NC	0	—N/a	—N/a	1st	287
2013	Pata Honda World Supersport	Honda CBR600RR	P			AUS	SPA	NED	ITA	GBR	POR	ITA	RUS	GBR	GER	TUR	FRA	SPA							
2013	Pata Honda World Supersport	Honda CBR600RR	P	26	(Italy) Lorenzo Zanetti	8	6	10	3	4	14	4	C	11	4	4	7	5		5th	119	3rd	249	3rd	165
2013	Pata Honda World Supersport	Honda CBR600RR	P	60	(Netherlands) Michael van der Mark	3	2	4	DNS	20	4	5	C	9	5	3	6	4		4th	130	3rd	249	3rd	165
2014	Pata Honda World Supersport Team	Honda CBR600RR	P			AUS	SPA	NED	ITA	GBR	MAL	ITA	POR	SPA	FRA	QAT									
2014	Pata Honda World Supersport Team	Honda CBR600RR	P	26	(Italy) Lorenzo Zanetti	DNS	4	5	1	Ret	5	6	6	6	4	7				4th	112	1st	342	1st	251
2014	Pata Honda World Supersport Team	Honda CBR600RR	P	60	(Netherlands) Michael van der Mark	Ret	2	1	2	**1**	1	2	1	**1**	2	1				1st	230	1st	342	1st	251
2015	Pata Honda World Supersport Team	Honda CBR600RR	P			AUS	THA	SPA	NED	ITA	GBR	POR	ITA	MAL	SPA	FRA	QAT								
2015	Pata Honda World Supersport Team	Honda CBR600RR	P	111	(United Kingdom) Kyle Smith	4	Ret	3	3	15	Ret	6	Ret	5	4	5	1			5th	116	5th	116	2nd	222
2016	Honda World Supersport Team	Honda CBR600RR	P			AUS	THA	SPA	NED	ITA	MAL	GBR	ITA	GER	FRA	SPA	QAT								
2016	Honda World Supersport Team	Honda CBR600RR	P	2	(United States) P. J. Jacobsen	5	3	Ret	Ret	3	4	2	2	4	Ret	4	4			4th	135	4th	135	2nd	221

Year	Team	Bike	Tyres	No.	Riders	1		2		3		4		5		6		7		8		9		10		11		12		RC	Points	TC	Points	MC	Points
Year	Team	Bike	Tyres	No.	Riders	R1	R2	R1	R2	R1	R2	R1	R2	R1	R2	R1	R2	R1	R2	R1	R2	R1	R2	R1	R2	R1	R2	R1	R2	RC	Points	TC	Points	MC	Points
2020	EAB Ten Kate Racing	Yamaha YZF-R6	P			AUS		SPA	SPA	POR	POR	ARA	ARA	ARA	ARA	SPA	SPA	FRA	FRA	POR	POR														
2020	EAB Ten Kate Racing	Yamaha YZF-R6	P	4	(South Africa) Steven Odendaal	6		6	8	8	4	6	8	Ret	9	6	5	12	4	5	4									5th	136	6th	136	1st	365
2021	Ten Kate Racing Yamaha	Yamaha YZF-R6	P			SPA	SPA	POR	POR	ITA	ITA	NED	NED	CZE	CZE	SPA	SPA	FRA	FRA	SPA	SPA	SPA	SPA	POR	POR	ARG	ARG	INA	INA						
2021	Ten Kate Racing Yamaha	Yamaha YZF-R6	P	9	(Denmark) Simon Jespersen											9	8			11	14									22nd	22	1st	456	1st	570
2021	Ten Kate Racing Yamaha	Yamaha YZF-R6	P	24	(Italy) Leonardo Taccini																					17	11			31st	9	1st	456	1st	570
2021	Ten Kate Racing Yamaha	Yamaha YZF-R6	P	55	(Indonesia) Galang Hendra Pratama	15	10	20	19	13	14	14	Ret	14	DNS	11	Ret	Ret	20	13	22	C	Ret	22	21			Ret	13	21st	27	1st	456	1st	570
2021	Ten Kate Racing Yamaha	Yamaha YZF-R6	P	77	(Switzerland) Dominique Aegerter	2	5	4	1	**1**	**1**	**1**	**1**	4	1	**1**	**1**	1	2			C	1	3	5	5	3	**2**	**3**	1st	417	1st	456	1st	570
2022	Ten Kate Racing Yamaha	Yamaha YZF-R6	P			SPA	SPA	NED	NED	POR	POR	ITA	ITA	GBR	GBR	CZE	CZE	FRA	FRA	SPA	SPA	POR	POR	ARG	ARG	INA	INA	AUS	AUS						
2022	Ten Kate Racing Yamaha	Yamaha YZF-R6	P	24	(Italy) Leonardo Taccini	18	Ret	10	13	14	DNS	14	Ret	13	15	16	13	14	Ret	11	9	Ret	DNS			15	18	17	19	21st	35	1st	535	1st	571
2022	Ten Kate Racing Yamaha	Yamaha YZF-R6	P	57	(United Kingdom) Bradley Smith																			14	Ret					33rd	2	1st	535	1st	571
2022	Ten Kate Racing Yamaha	Yamaha YZF-R6	P	77	(Switzerland) Dominique Aegerter	2	1	**1**	**1**	**1**	**1**	**1**	**1**	**1**	**1**	Ret	EX	3	1	**1**	**1**	**4**	**1**	**1**	**1**	4	1	5	1	1st	498	1st	535	1st	571
2023	Ten Kate Racing Yamaha	Yamaha YZF-R6	P			AUS	AUS	INA	INA	NED	NED	SPA	SPA	EMI	EMI	GBR	GBR	ITA	ITA	CZE	CZE	FRA	FRA	SPA	SPA	POR	POR	SPA	SPA						
2023	Ten Kate Racing Yamaha	Yamaha YZF-R6	P	9	(Spain) Jorge Navarro	9	6	12	8	10	7	7	9	8	18	12	11	Ret	6	9	Ret	Ret	9	7	6	3	7	4	11	7th	163	1st	571	2nd	445
2023	Ten Kate Racing Yamaha	Yamaha YZF-R6	P	62	(Italy) Stefano Manzi	**6**	**2**	7	2	5	2	6	3	2	1	2	5	1	1	2	Ret	2	3	11	2	2	1	2	2	2nd	408	1st	571	2nd	445
2024	Ten Kate Racing Yamaha	Yamaha YZF-R6	P			AUS	AUS	SPA	SPA	NED	NED	ITA	ITA	GBR	GBR	CZE	CZE	POR	POR	FRA	FRA	ITA	ITA	SPA	SPA	POR	POR	SPA	SPA						
2024	Ten Kate Racing Yamaha	Yamaha YZF-R6	P	28	(Netherlands) Glenn van Straalen	18	20	14	10	4	1	10	14	12	7	9	7	9	6	3	6	Ret	15	9	10	9	7	11	12	8th	165	1st	580	2nd	474
2024	Ten Kate Racing Yamaha	Yamaha YZF-R6	P	62	(Italy) Stefano Manzi	2	Ret	2	1	**2**	21	3	4	2	4	3	**2**	3	2	Ret	2	2	1	2	**2**	3	1	1	1	2nd	415	1st	580	2nd	474
2025	Pata Yamaha Ten Kate Racing	Yamaha YZF-R9	P			AUS	AUS	POR	POR	NED	NED	ITA	ITA	CZE	CZE	EMI	EMI	GBR	GBR	HUN	HUN	FRA	FRA	ARA	ARA	POR	POR	SPA	SPA						
2025	Pata Yamaha Ten Kate Racing	Yamaha YZF-R9	P	31	(Japan) Yuki Okamoto			24	21	17	16	16	14	17	31	24	20	DNS	DNS			17	18	25	26	24	25	25	Ret	30th	2	2nd	468	1st	561
2025	Pata Yamaha Ten Kate Racing	Yamaha YZF-R9	P	62	(Italy) Stefano Manzi	1	2	2	2	2	**2**	1	1	26	6	1	Ret	**1**	**7**	1	**1**	1	1	3	2	2	1	1	3	1st	466	2nd	468	1st	561
2026	Pata Yamaha Ten Kate Racing	Yamaha YZF-R9	P			AUS	AUS	POR	POR	NED	NED	HUN	HUN	CZE	CZE	ARA	ARA	EMI	EMI	GBR	GBR	FRA	FRA	ITA	ITA	POR	POR	SPA	SPA						
2026	Pata Yamaha Ten Kate Racing	Yamaha YZF-R9	P	31	(Japan) Yuki Okamoto	17	22	22	21																					20th*	0*	6th*	22*	2nd*	38*
2026	Pata Yamaha Ten Kate Racing	Yamaha YZF-R9	P	61	(Turkey) Can Öncü	5	5	25	8																					6th*	22*	6th*	22*	2nd*	38*

* Season still in progress.
