= 2014 Misano Superbike World Championship round =

(Italy) 2014 Misano Superbike World Championship round
Round details
- Round 7 of 12 rounds in the 2014 Superbike World Championship. and Round 7 of 11 rounds in the 2014 Supersport World Championship.
- Date: 22 June, 2014
- Location: Misano
- Course: Permanent racing facility 4.226 km (2.626 mi)

Superbike World Championship
Pole position
(United Kingdom) Tom Sykes
1:34.883
| Fastest lap race 1 | Fastest lap race 2 |
| (United Kingdom) Tom Sykes | (Italy) Davide Giugliano |
| 1:35.629 | 1:36.033 |

Supersport World Championship
Pole position
(France) Jules Cluzel
1:38.616
Fastest lap
(United States) P. J. Jacobsen
1:39.436

The 2014 Misano Superbike World Championship round was the seventh round of the 2014 Superbike World Championship. it took place over the weekend of 20–22 June 2014 at the Misano World Circuit located in Misano Adriatico, Italy.

== Superbike ==
=== Race 1 classification ===
| Pos | No. | Rider | Bike | Laps | Time | Grid | Points |
|---|---|---|---|---|---|---|---|
| 1 | 1 | (United Kingdom) Tom Sykes | Kawasaki ZX-10R | 21 | 33:46.932 | 1 | 25 |
| 2 | 76 | (France) Loris Baz | Kawasaki ZX-10R | 21 | +5.012 | 4 | 20 |
| 3 | 33 | (Italy) Marco Melandri | Aprilia RSV4 Factory | 21 | +6.417 | 5 | 16 |
| 4 | 7 | (United Kingdom) Chaz Davies | Ducati 1199 Panigale R | 21 | +7.783 | 7 | 13 |
| 5 | 50 | (France) Sylvain Guintoli | Aprilia RSV4 Factory | 21 | +16.248 | 3 | 11 |
| 6 | 24 | (Spain) Toni Elias | Aprilia RSV4 Factory | 21 | +17.399 | 6 | 10 |
| 7 | 65 | (United Kingdom) Jonathan Rea | Honda CBR1000RR | 21 | +21.162 | 8 | 9 |
| 8 | 34 | (Italy) Davide Giugliano | Ducati 1199 Panigale R | 21 | +26.393 | 2 | 8 |
| 9 | 58 | (Republic of Ireland) Eugene Laverty | Suzuki GSX-R1000 | 21 | +26.842 | 9 | 7 |
| 10 | 91 | (United Kingdom) Leon Haslam | Honda CBR1000RR | 21 | +40.600 | 12 | 6 |
| 11 | 44 | (Spain) David Salom | Kawasaki ZX-10R EVO | 21 | +42.064 | 13 | 5 |
| N/A^{1} | 86 | (Italy) Ayrton Badovini | Bimota BB3 EVO | 21 | +46.219 | 15 | |
| 12 | 59 | (Italy) Niccolò Canepa | Ducati 1199 Panigale R EVO | 21 | +46.804 | 10 | 4 |
| 13 | 71 | (Italy) Claudio Corti | MV Agusta F4 RR | 21 | +48.909 | 16 | 3 |
| 14 | 112 | (Italy) Ivan Goi | Ducati 1199 Panigale R EVO | 21 | +50.429 | 18 | 2 |
| 15 | 52 | (France) Sylvain Barrier | BMW S1000RR EVO | 21 | +52.452 | 17 | 1 |
| N/A^{1} | 2 | (United Kingdom) Christian Iddon | Bimota BB3 EVO | 21 | +53.155 | 21 | |
| 16 | 11 | (France) Jérémy Guarnoni | Kawasaki ZX-10R EVO | 21 | +1:02.476 | 22 | |
| 17 | 48 | (Italy) Riccardo Russo | Kawasaki ZX-10R EVO | 21 | +1:11.815 | 23 | |
| 18 | 67 | (Australia) Bryan Staring | Kawasaki ZX-10R EVO | 21 | +1:23.649 | 25 | |
| 19 | 56 | (Hungary) Péter Sebestyén | BMW S1000RR EVO | 20 | +1 lap | 27 | |
| Ret | 32 | (South Africa) Sheridan Morais | Kawasaki ZX-10R EVO | 18 | Retirement | 19 | |
| Ret | 22 | (United Kingdom) Alex Lowes | Suzuki GSX-R1000 | 12 | Accident | 11 | |
| Ret | 20 | (United States) Aaron Yates | EBR 1190 RX | 10 | Retirement | 26 | |
| Ret | 9 | (France) Fabien Foret | Kawasaki ZX-10R EVO | 9 | Retirement | 20 | |
| Ret | 15 | (Italy) Matteo Baiocco | Ducati 1199 Panigale R EVO | 7 | Retirement | 14 | |
| Ret | 21 | (Italy) Alessandro Andreozzi | Kawasaki ZX-10R EVO | 5 | Accident | 24 | |
| Ret | 99 | (United States) Geoff May | EBR 1190 RX | 4 | Retirement | 28 | |
| DNS | 10 | (Hungary) Imre Tóth | BMW S1000RR | | Did not start | | |
| DNS | 30 | (Switzerland) Michaël Savary | MV Agusta F4 RR | | Did not start | | |
OFFICIAL SUPERBIKE RACE 1 REPORT

Notes:

- ^1 — Bimota entries were not eligible to score points and were removed from the race results.

=== Race 2 classification ===
| Pos | No. | Rider | Bike | Laps | Time | Grid | Points |
|---|---|---|---|---|---|---|---|
| 1 | 1 | (United Kingdom) Tom Sykes | Kawasaki ZX-10R | 21 | 33:55.695 | 1 | 25 |
| 2 | 76 | (France) Loris Baz | Kawasaki ZX-10R | 21 | +3.083 | 4 | 20 |
| 3 | 33 | (Italy) Marco Melandri | Aprilia RSV4 Factory | 21 | +3.413 | 5 | 16 |
| 4 | 50 | (France) Sylvain Guintoli | Aprilia RSV4 Factory | 21 | +5.092 | 3 | 13 |
| 5 | 65 | (United Kingdom) Jonathan Rea | Honda CBR1000RR | 21 | +18.975 | 8 | 11 |
| 6 | 24 | (Spain) Toni Elias | Aprilia RSV4 Factory | 21 | +19.365 | 6 | 10 |
| 7 | 58 | (Republic of Ireland) Eugene Laverty | Suzuki GSX-R1000 | 21 | +20.177 | 9 | 9 |
| 8 | 22 | (United Kingdom) Alex Lowes | Suzuki GSX-R1000 | 21 | +20.439 | 11 | 8 |
| 9 | 34 | (Italy) Davide Giugliano | Ducati 1199 Panigale R | 21 | +33.820 | 2 | 7 |
| 10 | 44 | (Spain) David Salom | Kawasaki ZX-10R EVO | 21 | +42.156 | 13 | 6 |
| N/A^{1} | 86 | (Italy) Ayrton Badovini | Bimota BB3 EVO | 21 | +43.176 | 15 | |
| 11 | 52 | (France) Sylvain Barrier | BMW S1000RR EVO | 21 | +43.581 | 17 | 5 |
| 12 | 91 | (United Kingdom) Leon Haslam | Honda CBR1000RR | 21 | +51.993 | 12 | 4 |
| 13 | 112 | (Italy) Ivan Goi | Ducati 1199 Panigale R EVO | 21 | +53.714 | 18 | 3 |
| 14 | 48 | (Italy) Riccardo Russo | Kawasaki ZX-10R EVO | 21 | +59.316 | 23 | 2 |
| 15 | 21 | (Italy) Alessandro Andreozzi | Kawasaki ZX-10R EVO | 21 | +1:00.914 | 24 | 1 |
| 16 | 59 | (Italy) Niccolò Canepa | Ducati 1199 Panigale R EVO | 21 | +1:01.839 | 10 | |
| 17 | 71 | (Italy) Claudio Corti | MV Agusta F4 RR | 21 | +1:07.178 | 16 | |
| 18 | 67 | (Australia) Bryan Staring | Kawasaki ZX-10R EVO | 21 | +1:13.510 | 25 | |
| 19 | 56 | (Hungary) Péter Sebestyén | BMW S1000RR EVO | 21 | +1:31.715 | 26 | |
| Ret | 11 | (France) Jérémy Guarnoni | Kawasaki ZX-10R EVO | 17 | Retirement | 22 | |
| Ret | 99 | (United States) Geoff May | EBR 1190 RX | 16 | Retirement | 27 | |
| Ret | 7 | (United Kingdom) Chaz Davies | Ducati 1199 Panigale R | 15 | Retirement | 7 | |
| Ret | 32 | (South Africa) Sheridan Morais | Kawasaki ZX-10R EVO | 10 | Retirement | 19 | |
| N/A^{1} | 2 | (United Kingdom) Christian Iddon | Bimota BB3 EVO | 2 | Retirement | 21 | |
| DNS | 15 | (Italy) Matteo Baiocco | Ducati 1199 Panigale R EVO | 0 | Did not start | 14 | |
| DNS | 9 | (France) Fabien Foret | Kawasaki ZX-10R EVO | 0 | Did not start | 20 | |
| DNS | 20 | (United States) Aaron Yates | EBR 1190 RX | | Did not start | | |
| DNS | 10 | (Hungary) Imre Tóth | BMW S1000RR | | Did not start | | |
| DNS | 30 | (Switzerland) Michaël Savary | MV Agusta F4 RR | | Did not start | | |
OFFICIAL SUPERBIKE RACE 2 REPORT

Notes:

- ^1 — Bimota entries were not eligible to score points and were removed from the race results.

== Supersport ==
=== Race classification ===
| Pos | No. | Rider | Bike | Laps | Time | Grid | Points |
|---|---|---|---|---|---|---|---|
| 1 | 16 | (France) Jules Cluzel | MV Agusta F3 675 | 19 | 31:40.587 | 1 | 25 |
| 2 | 60 | (Netherlands) Michael Van Der Mark | Honda CBR600RR | 19 | +1:537 | 2 | 20 |
| 3 | 99 | (United States) P. J. Jacobsen | Kawasaki ZX-6R | 19 | +3.400 | 8 | 16 |
| 4 | 54 | (Turkey) Kenan Sofuoğlu | Kawasaki ZX-6R | 19 | +5.638 | 4 | 13 |
| 5 | 5 | (Italy) Roberto Tamburini | Kawasaki ZX-6R | 19 | +9.923 | 9 | 11 |
| 6 | 26 | (Italy) Lorenzo Zanetti | Honda CBR600RR | 19 | +11:018 | 6 | 10 |
| 7 | 21 | (France) Florian Marino | Kawasaki ZX-6R | 19 | +14.714 | 7 | 9 |
| 8 | 88 | (United Kingdom) Kev Coghlan | Yamaha YZF-R6 | 19 | +17.365 | 12 | 8 |
| 9 | 14 | (Thailand) Ratthapark Wilairot | Honda CBR600RR | 19 | +21.337 | 5 | 7 |
| 10 | 44 | (Italy) Roberto Rolfo | Kawasaki ZX-6R | 19 | +22.215 | 13 | 6 |
| 11 | 10 | (Italy) Alessandro Nocco | Kawasaki ZX-6R | 19 | +22.407 | 14 | 5 |
| 12 | 4 | (Republic of Ireland) Jack Kennedy | Honda CBR600RR | 19 | +22.641 | 10 | 4 |
| 13 | 19 | (Germany) Kevin Wahr | Yamaha YZF-R6 | 19 | +28.443 | 16 | 3 |
| 14 | 155 | (Italy) Massimo Roccoli | MV Agusta F3 675 | 19 | +30.202 | 11 | 2 |
| 15 | 11 | (Italy) Christian Gamarino | Kawasaki ZX-6R | 19 | +33.760 | 20 | 1 |
| 16 | 53 | (France) Valentin Debise | Honda CBR600RR | 19 | +40.917 | 21 | |
| 17 | 61 | (Italy) Fabio Menghi | Yamaha YZF-R6 | 19 | +40.926 | 19 | |
| 18 | 9 | (Netherlands) Tony Coveña | Kawasaki ZX-6R | 19 | +41.457 | 24 | |
| 19 | 25 | (Italy) Alex Baldolini | MV Agusta F3 675 | 19 | +45.086 | 17 | |
| 20 | 35 | (Italy) Raffaele De Rosa | Honda CBR600RR | 19 | +50.237 | 3 | |
| 21 | 87 | (Italy) Luca Marconi | Honda CBR600RR | 19 | +53.122 | 23 | |
| 22 | 28 | (Italy) Ferruccio Lamborghini | Honda CBR600RR | 19 | +53.129 | 18 | |
| 23 | 7 | (Spain) Nacho Calero | Yamaha YZF-R6 | 19 | +1:22.010 | 25 | |
| Ret | 24 | (Italy) Marco Bussolotti | Honda CBR600RR | 11 | Retirement | 15 | |
| Ret | 161 | (Russia) Alexey Ivanov | Yamaha YZF-R6 | 2 | Retirement | 22 | |
OFFICIAL SUPERSPORT RACE REPORT

== Superstock ==
=== STK1000 race classification ===
The race was stopped after 10 laps due to an incident involving Federico Sandi, the race wasn't resumed, and the results were taken from lap 10.

| Pos | No. | Rider | Bike | Laps | Time | Grid | Points |
|---|---|---|---|---|---|---|---|
| 1 | 32 | (Italy) Lorenzo Savadori | Kawasaki ZX-10R | 10 | 16:43.398 | 1 | 25 |
| 2 | 36 | (Argentina) Leandro Mercado | Ducati 1199 Panigale R | 10 | +5.534 | 2 | 20 |
| 3 | 43 | (Italy) Fabio Massei | Ducati 1199 Panigale R | 10 | +5.666 | 3 | 16 |
| 4 | 69 | (Czech Republic) Ondřej Ježek | Ducati 1199 Panigale R | 10 | 6.897 | 4 | 13 |
| 5 | 169 | (South Africa) David McFadden | Kawasaki ZX-10R | 10 | +8.492 | 7 | 11 |
| 6 | 41 | (Italy) Federico D'Annunzio | BMW S1000RR HP4 | 10 | +8.627 | 6 | 10 |
| 7 | 98 | (France) Romain Lanusse | Kawasaki ZX-10R | 10 | +14.038 | 9 | 9 |
| 8 | 94 | (France) Mathieu Lussiana | Kawasaki ZX-10R | 10 | +14.396 | 8 | 8 |
| 9 | 18 | (Netherlands) Kevin Valk | Kawasaki ZX-10R | 10 | +16.683 | 13 | 7 |
| 10 | 11 | (United Kingdom) Kyle Smith | Honda CBR1000RR | 10 | +17.205 | 10 | 6 |
| 11 | 34 | (Hungary) Balázs Németh | Kawasaki ZX-10R | 10 | +18.848 | 12 | 5 |
| 12 | 74 | (Italy) Kevin Calia | Aprilia RSV4 APRC | 10 | +18.964 | 11 | 4 |
| 13 | 5 | (Romania) Robert Mureșan | BMW S1000RR | 10 | +22.066 | 14 | 3 |
| 14 | 24 | (France) Stéphane Egea | Kawasaki ZX-10R | 10 | +23.302 | 17 | 2 |
| 15 | 53 | (Spain) Antonio Alarcos | Kawasaki ZX-10R | 10 | +24.930 | 15 | 1 |
| 16 | 3 | (Switzerland) Sébastien Suchet | Kawasaki ZX-10R | 10 | +25.414 | 20 | |
| 17 | 22 | (Italy) Raffaele Vargas | Kawasaki ZX-10R | 10 | +29.685 | 19 | |
| 18 | 59 | (Denmark) Alex Schacht | Ducati 1199 Panigale R | 10 | +29.950 | 22 | |
| 19 | 39 | (France) Randy Pagaud | Kawasaki ZX-10R | 10 | +36.859 | 24 | |
| 20 | 95 | (Austria) Julian Mayer | Kawasaki ZX-10R | 10 | +39.271 | 28 | |
| 21 | 16 | (Italy) Remo Castellarin | BMW S1000RR HP4 | 10 | +40.560 | 23 | |
| 22 | 55 | (Slovakia) Tomáš Svitok | Ducati 1199 Panigale R | 10 | +59.661 | 26 | |
| Ret | 23 | (Italy) Federico Sandi | BMW S1000RR HP4 | 10 | Accident | 5 | |
| Ret | 93 | (Italy) Alberto Butti | Kawasaki ZX-10R | 8 | Retirement | 25 | |
| Ret | 4 | (United States) Joshua Day | Honda CBR1000RR | 3 | Technical problem | 16 | |
| Ret | 7 | (Switzerland) Jérémy Ayer | Kawasaki ZX-10R | 2 | Accident | 27 | |
| Ret | 15 | (Italy) Simone Grotzkyj | Kawasaki ZX-10R | 1 | Accident | 21 | |
| Ret | 28 | (Germany) Marc Moser | Ducati 1199 Panigale R | 1 | Technical problem | 18 | |
| DNS | 12 | (Switzerland) Jonathan Crea | Kawasaki ZX-10R | | Did not start | | |
OFFICIAL SUPERSTOCK 1000 RACE REPORT
