= 2016 Donington Park Superbike World Championship round =

(United Kingdom) 2016 Donington Park Superbike World Championship round
Round details
- Round 7 of 13 rounds in the 2016 Superbike World Championship. and Round 7 of 12 rounds in the 2016 Supersport World Championship.
- Date: 28–29 May, 2016
- Location: Donington Park
- Course: Permanent racing facility 4.023 km (2.500 mi)

Superbike World Championship
Pole position
(United Kingdom) Tom Sykes
1:26.712
Fastest lap race 1	Fastest lap race 2
(United Kingdom) Jonathan Rea	(United Kingdom) Jonathan Rea
1:27.988	1:27.605

Supersport World Championship
Pole position
(Turkey) Kenan Sofuoğlu
1:30.298
Fastest lap
(United Kingdom) Kyle Smith
1:30.887

The 2016 Donington Park Superbike World Championship round was the seventh round of the 2016 Superbike World Championship. It took place over the weekend of 27–29 May 2016 at the Donington Park.

== Championship standings after the round ==
Superbike Championship standings after Race 1

Pos.	Rider	Points
1	(United Kingdom) Jonathan Rea	273
2	(United Kingdom) Chaz Davies	215
3	(United Kingdom) Tom Sykes	212
4	(Italy) Davide Giugliano	138
5	(Netherlands) Michael van der Mark	133
6	(United States) Nicky Hayden	126
7	(Spain) Jordi Torres	112
8	(United Kingdom) Leon Camier	86
9	(Italy) Lorenzo Savadori	76
10	(United Kingdom) Alex Lowes	70
11	(Spain) Javier Forés	60
12	(France) Sylvain Guintoli	58
13	(Germany) Markus Reiterberger	58
14	(San Marino) Alex de Angelis	41
15	(Australia) Josh Brookes	41

Superbike Championship standings after Race 2

Pos.	Rider	Points
1	(United Kingdom) Jonathan Rea	293
2	(United Kingdom) Tom Sykes	237
3	(United Kingdom) Chaz Davies	231
4	(Italy) Davide Giugliano	147
5	(Netherlands) Michael van der Mark	141
6	(United States) Nicky Hayden	136
7	(Spain) Jordi Torres	117
8	(United Kingdom) Leon Camier	97
9	(Italy) Lorenzo Savadori	89
10	(United Kingdom) Alex Lowes	70
11	(Spain) Javier Forés	62
12	(France) Sylvain Guintoli	58
13	(Germany) Markus Reiterberger	58
14	(Australia) Josh Brookes	48
15	(San Marino) Alex de Angelis	42

Supersport Championship standings

Pos.	Rider	Points
1	(Turkey) Kenan Sofuoğlu	121
2	(Switzerland) Randy Krummenacher	95
3	(United States) P. J. Jacobsen	76
4	(France) Jules Cluzel	75
5	(United Kingdom) Kyle Smith	68
6	(United Kingdom) Gino Rea	65
7	(Italy) Alex Baldolini	60
8	(Italy) Federico Caricasulo	54
9	(Italy) Ayrton Badovini	49
10	(Malaysia) Zulfahmi Khairuddin	40
11	(Czech Republic) Ondřej Ježek	33
12	(Spain) Nicolás Terol	31
13	(Italy) Christian Gamarino	30
14	(Italy) Alessandro Zaccone	26
15	(Italy) Axel Bassani	21
