= Van der Mark =

Van der Mark or Vandermark is a surname. Notable people with the surname include:

- Ken Vandermark (born 1964), American composer, saxophonist, and clarinetist
- Michael van der Mark (born 1992), Dutch motorcycle racer
