= 2016 Sepang Superbike World Championship round =

(Malaysia) 2016 Sepang Superbike World Championship round
Round details
- Round 6 of 13 rounds in the 2016 Superbike World Championship. and Round 6 of 12 rounds in the 2016 Supersport World Championship.
- Date: 14–15 May, 2016
- Location: Sepang
- Course: Permanent racing facility 5.543 km (3.444 mi)

Superbike World Championship
Pole position
(United Kingdom) Tom Sykes
2:02.246
Fastest lap race 1	Fastest lap race 2
(United Kingdom) Tom Sykes	(Italy) Davide Giugliano
2:03.637	2:16.716

Supersport World Championship
Pole position
(Turkey) Kenan Sofuoğlu
2:08.055
Fastest lap
(United States) P. J. Jacobsen
2:21.142

The 2016 Sepang Superbike World Championship round was the sixth round of the 2016 Superbike World Championship. It took place over the weekend of 13–15 May 2016 at the Sepang International Circuit.

== Championship standings after the round ==
Superbike Championship standings after Race 1

Pos.	Rider	Points
1	(United Kingdom) Jonathan Rea	241
2	(United Kingdom) Chaz Davies	202
3	(United Kingdom) Tom Sykes	179
4	(Netherlands) Michael van der Mark	115
5	(Spain) Jordi Torres	100
6	(Italy) Davide Giugliano	98
7	(United States) Nicky Hayden	90
8	(United Kingdom) Alex Lowes	70
9	(United Kingdom) Leon Camier	66
10	(Italy) Lorenzo Savadori	64
11	(France) Sylvain Guintoli	58
12	(Spain) Javier Forés	51
13	(Germany) Markus Reiterberger	47
14	(Spain) Román Ramos	36
15	(Australia) Josh Brookes	35

Superbike Championship standings after Race 2

Pos.	Rider	Points
1	(United Kingdom) Jonathan Rea	257
2	(United Kingdom) Chaz Davies	215
3	(United Kingdom) Tom Sykes	187
4	(Netherlands) Michael van der Mark	125
5	(Italy) Davide Giugliano	118
6	(United States) Nicky Hayden	115
7	(Spain) Jordi Torres	103
8	(United Kingdom) Leon Camier	73
9	(United Kingdom) Alex Lowes	70
10	(Italy) Lorenzo Savadori	66
11	(France) Sylvain Guintoli	58
12	(Spain) Javier Forés	56
13	(Germany) Markus Reiterberger	53
14	(San Marino) Alex de Angelis	41
15	(Australia) Josh Brookes	39

Supersport Championship standings

Pos.	Rider	Points
1	(Turkey) Kenan Sofuoğlu	96
2	(Switzerland) Randy Krummenacher	79
3	(France) Jules Cluzel	67
4	(United Kingdom) Kyle Smith	58
5	(United States) P. J. Jacobsen	56
6	(United Kingdom) Gino Rea	52
7	(Italy) Alex Baldolini	51
8	(Italy) Federico Caricasulo	49
9	(Italy) Ayrton Badovini	42
10	(Malaysia) Zulfahmi Khairuddin	40
11	(Czech Republic) Ondřej Ježek	33
12	(Spain) Nicolás Terol	31
13	(Italy) Christian Gamarino	30
14	(Italy) Alessandro Zaccone	22
15	(Italy) Axel Bassani	21
