= 2016 Laguna Seca Superbike World Championship round =

(United States) 2016 Laguna Seca Superbike World Championship round
Round details
- Round 9 of 13 rounds in the 2016 Superbike World Championship.
- Date: 9–10 July, 2016
- Location: Laguna Seca
- Course: Permanent racing facility 3.610 km (2.243 mi)

Superbike World Championship
Pole position
(United Kingdom) Tom Sykes
1:22.155
Fastest lap race 1	Fastest lap race 2
(United Kingdom) Chaz Davies	(United Kingdom) Tom Sykes
1:23.443	1:23.552

The 2016 Laguna Seca Superbike World Championship round was the ninth round of the 2016 Superbike World Championship. It took place over the weekend of 8–10 July 2016 at the Mazda Raceway Laguna Seca.

== Championship standings after the round ==
Superbike Championship standings after Race 1

Pos.	Rider	Points
1	(United Kingdom) Jonathan Rea	368
2	(United Kingdom) Tom Sykes	297
3	(United Kingdom) Chaz Davies	244
4	(Netherlands) Michael van der Mark	176
5	(Italy) Davide Giugliano	165
6	(United States) Nicky Hayden	162
7	(Spain) Jordi Torres	145
8	(United Kingdom) Leon Camier	110
9	(Italy) Lorenzo Savadori	110
10	(United Kingdom) Alex Lowes	92
11	(Spain) Javier Forés	84
12	(Germany) Markus Reiterberger	68
13	(France) Sylvain Guintoli	58
14	(Australia) Josh Brookes	58
15	(San Marino) Alex de Angelis	56

Superbike Championship standings after Race 2

Pos.	Rider	Points
1	(United Kingdom) Jonathan Rea	368
2	(United Kingdom) Tom Sykes	322
3	(United Kingdom) Chaz Davies	260
4	(Italy) Davide Giugliano	185
5	(Netherlands) Michael van der Mark	185
6	(United States) Nicky Hayden	173
7	(Spain) Jordi Torres	155
8	(United Kingdom) Leon Camier	110
9	(Italy) Lorenzo Savadori	110
10	(Spain) Javier Forés	97
11	(United Kingdom) Alex Lowes	94
12	(Germany) Markus Reiterberger	68
13	(Spain) Román Ramos	60
14	(France) Sylvain Guintoli	58
15	(Australia) Josh Brookes	58
