= 2016 Buriram Superbike World Championship round =

(Thailand) 2016 Buriram Superbike World Championship round
Round details
- Round 2 of 13 rounds in the 2016 Superbike World Championship. and Round 2 of 12 rounds in the 2016 Supersport World Championship.
- Date: 12–13 March, 2016
- Location: Chang International Circuit
- Course: Permanent racing facility 4.554 km (2.830 mi)

Superbike World Championship
Pole position
(Netherlands) Michael van der Mark
1:33.452
Fastest lap race 1	Fastest lap race 2
(United Kingdom) Jonathan Rea	(United Kingdom) Jonathan Rea
1:33.936	1:33.997

Supersport World Championship
Pole position
(France) Jules Cluzel
1:38.383
Fastest lap
(United Kingdom) Kyle Smith
1:38.618

The 2016 Buriram Superbike World Championship round was the second round of the 2016 Superbike World Championship. It took place over the weekend of 11–13 March 2016 at the Chang International Circuit.

== Championship standings after the round ==
Superbike Championship standings after Race 1

Pos.	Rider	Points
1	(United Kingdom) Jonathan Rea	75
2	(Netherlands) Michael van der Mark	52
3	(United Kingdom) Tom Sykes	41
4	(United Kingdom) Chaz Davies	39
5	(France) Sylvain Guintoli	30
6	(Italy) Davide Giugliano	29
7	(Spain) Jordi Torres	25
8	(United States) Nicky Hayden	20
9	(Germany) Markus Reiterberger	19
10	(United Kingdom) Leon Camier	14
11	(Australia) Josh Brookes	14
12	(Spain) Román Ramos	13
13	(United Kingdom) Alex Lowes	12
14	(San Marino) Alex de Angelis	10
15	(Italy) Lorenzo Savadori	10

Superbike Championship standings after Race 2

Pos.	Rider	Points
1	(United Kingdom) Jonathan Rea	95
2	(United Kingdom) Tom Sykes	66
3	(Netherlands) Michael van der Mark	65
4	(United Kingdom) Chaz Davies	55
5	(France) Sylvain Guintoli	40
6	(Italy) Davide Giugliano	35
7	(Spain) Jordi Torres	33
8	(United States) Nicky Hayden	31
9	(Germany) Markus Reiterberger	28
10	(United Kingdom) Leon Camier	19
11	(Italy) Lorenzo Savadori	17
12	(Spain) Román Ramos	17
13	(Australia) Josh Brookes	14
14	(United Kingdom) Alex Lowes	12
15	(San Marino) Alex de Angelis	12

Supersport Championship standings

Pos.	Rider	Points
1	(Switzerland) Randy Krummenacher	38
2	(United States) P. J. Jacobsen	27
3	(France) Jules Cluzel	25
4	(Turkey) Kenan Sofuoğlu	20
5	(Italy) Federico Caricasulo	20
6	(Italy) Alex Baldolini	20
7	(Australia) Anthony West	16
8	(United Kingdom) Gino Rea	16
9	(Czech Republic) Ondřej Ježek	14
10	(Italy) Christian Gamarino	13
11	(Malaysia) Zulfahmi Khairuddin	12
12	(United Kingdom) Kyle Smith	11
13	(Italy) Lorenzo Zanetti	8
14	(Italy) Roberto Rolfo	7
15	(Australia) Aiden Wagner	7
