= 2016 Superbike World Championship =

2016 Superbike World Championship
Previous:	2015	Next:	2017
Support series: Supersport World Championship; FIM Superstock 1000 Cup; European Junior Cup

The 2016 Superbike World Championship was the 29th season of the Superbike World Championship. Jonathan Rea won his second consecutive Superbike World Championship title at the first race of the last round at Losail, while Kawasaki had secured the manufacturers' title at the previous event at Jerez. Chaz Davies won the most races this season with Davies winning 11 races to Rea's 9.

== Race calendar and results ==
In comparison with the previous season, the calendar saw the discontinuation of the Algarve round and the return of Lausitzring; Autodromo Nazionale Monza, which was also due to reappear on 23–24 July as the tenth round—subject to track homologation—was removed from the calendar on 1 April 2016; the round was definitively cancelled the following 29 April, as no replacement venue had ultimately been found.

After changes in the standard weekend timetable, the first race, which was previously run on Sunday along with the second one, was scheduled to be held on Saturday.

2016 Superbike World Championship Calendar
Round			Circuit	Date	Superpole	Fastest lap	Winning rider	Winning team
1	R1	(Australia) Australian	Phillip Island Grand Prix Circuit	27 February	(United Kingdom) Tom Sykes	(Italy) Davide Giugliano	(United Kingdom) Jonathan Rea	Kawasaki Racing Team
1	R2	(Australia) Australian	Phillip Island Grand Prix Circuit	28 February	(United Kingdom) Tom Sykes	(United Kingdom) Chaz Davies	(United Kingdom) Jonathan Rea	Kawasaki Racing Team
2	R1	(Thailand) Thai	Chang International Circuit	12 March	(Netherlands) Michael van der Mark	(United Kingdom) Jonathan Rea	(United Kingdom) Jonathan Rea	Kawasaki Racing Team
2	R2	(Thailand) Thai	Chang International Circuit	13 March	(Netherlands) Michael van der Mark	(United Kingdom) Jonathan Rea	(United Kingdom) Tom Sykes	Kawasaki Racing Team
3	R1	(Spain) Aragón	Motorland Aragón	2 April	(United Kingdom) Tom Sykes	(United Kingdom) Chaz Davies	(United Kingdom) Chaz Davies	Aruba.it Racing – Ducati
3	R2	(Spain) Aragón	Motorland Aragón	3 April	(United Kingdom) Tom Sykes	(United Kingdom) Chaz Davies	(United Kingdom) Chaz Davies	Aruba.it Racing – Ducati
4	R1	(Netherlands) Dutch	TT Circuit Assen	16 April	(United Kingdom) Tom Sykes	(United Kingdom) Chaz Davies	(United Kingdom) Jonathan Rea	Kawasaki Racing Team
4	R2	(Netherlands) Dutch	TT Circuit Assen	17 April	(United Kingdom) Tom Sykes	(United Kingdom) Jonathan Rea	(United Kingdom) Jonathan Rea	Kawasaki Racing Team
5	R1	(Italy) Italian	Autodromo Enzo e Dino Ferrari	30 April	(United Kingdom) Chaz Davies	(United Kingdom) Chaz Davies	(United Kingdom) Chaz Davies	Aruba.it Racing – Ducati
5	R2	(Italy) Italian	Autodromo Enzo e Dino Ferrari	1 May	(United Kingdom) Chaz Davies	(United Kingdom) Chaz Davies	(United Kingdom) Chaz Davies	Aruba.it Racing – Ducati
6	R1	(Malaysia) Malaysian	Sepang International Circuit	14 May	(United Kingdom) Tom Sykes	(United Kingdom) Tom Sykes	(United Kingdom) Tom Sykes	Kawasaki Racing Team
6	R2	(Malaysia) Malaysian	Sepang International Circuit	15 May	(United Kingdom) Tom Sykes	(Italy) Davide Giugliano	(United States) Nicky Hayden	Honda World Superbike Team
7	R1	(United Kingdom) UK	Donington Park	28 May	(United Kingdom) Tom Sykes	(United Kingdom) Jonathan Rea	(United Kingdom) Tom Sykes	Kawasaki Racing Team
7	R2	(United Kingdom) UK	Donington Park	29 May	(United Kingdom) Tom Sykes	(United Kingdom) Jonathan Rea	(United Kingdom) Tom Sykes	Kawasaki Racing Team
8	R1	(Italy) Riviera di Rimini	Misano World Circuit Marco Simoncelli	18 June	(United Kingdom) Tom Sykes	(United Kingdom) Tom Sykes	(United Kingdom) Jonathan Rea	Kawasaki Racing Team
8	R2	(Italy) Riviera di Rimini	Misano World Circuit Marco Simoncelli	19 June	(United Kingdom) Tom Sykes	(United Kingdom) Alex Lowes	(United Kingdom) Jonathan Rea	Kawasaki Racing Team
9	R1	(United States) US	Mazda Raceway Laguna Seca	9 July	(United Kingdom) Tom Sykes	(United Kingdom) Chaz Davies	(United Kingdom) Jonathan Rea	Kawasaki Racing Team
9	R2	(United States) US	Mazda Raceway Laguna Seca	10 July	(United Kingdom) Tom Sykes	(United Kingdom) Tom Sykes	(United Kingdom) Tom Sykes	Kawasaki Racing Team
10	R1	(Germany) German	Lausitzring	17 September	(United Kingdom) Chaz Davies	(United Kingdom) Chaz Davies	(United Kingdom) Chaz Davies	Aruba.it Racing – Ducati
10	R2	(Germany) German	Lausitzring	18 September	(United Kingdom) Chaz Davies	(Spain) Javier Forés	(United Kingdom) Jonathan Rea	Kawasaki Racing Team
11	R1	(France) French	Circuit de Nevers Magny-Cours	1 October	(United Kingdom) Jonathan Rea	(United Kingdom) Tom Sykes	(United Kingdom) Chaz Davies	Aruba.it Racing – Ducati
11	R2	(France) French	Circuit de Nevers Magny-Cours	2 October	(United Kingdom) Jonathan Rea	(United Kingdom) Tom Sykes	(United Kingdom) Chaz Davies	Aruba.it Racing – Ducati
12	R1	(Spain) Spanish	Circuito de Jerez	15 October	(United Kingdom) Tom Sykes	(United Kingdom) Tom Sykes	(United Kingdom) Chaz Davies	Aruba.it Racing – Ducati
12	R2	(Spain) Spanish	Circuito de Jerez	16 October	(United Kingdom) Tom Sykes	(United Kingdom) Chaz Davies	(United Kingdom) Chaz Davies	Aruba.it Racing – Ducati
13	R1	Qatar	Losail International Circuit	29 October	(United Kingdom) Jonathan Rea	(United Kingdom) Chaz Davies	(United Kingdom) Chaz Davies	Aruba.it Racing – Ducati
13	R2	Qatar	Losail International Circuit	30 October	(United Kingdom) Jonathan Rea	(United Kingdom) Jonathan Rea	(United Kingdom) Chaz Davies	Aruba.it Racing – Ducati

== Entry list ==
2016 entry list
Team	Constructor	Motorcycle	No.	Rider	Rounds
(Japan) Kawasaki Racing Team	Kawasaki	Kawasaki ZX-10R	1	(United Kingdom) Jonathan Rea	All
(Japan) Kawasaki Racing Team	Kawasaki	Kawasaki ZX-10R	66	(United Kingdom) Tom Sykes	All
(Italy) MV Agusta Reparto Corse	MV Agusta	MV Agusta 1000 F4	2	(United Kingdom) Leon Camier	All
(Italy) Team GoEleven	Kawasaki	Kawasaki ZX-10R	4	(Italy) Gianluca Vizziello	5–6
(Italy) Team GoEleven	Kawasaki	Kawasaki ZX-10R	40	(Spain) Román Ramos	1–4, 7–13 (Note: Román Ramos was also entered into round 5 but was replaced by Gianluca Vizziello after two practice sessions due to injury.)
(Italy) Grillini Racing Team	Kawasaki	Kawasaki ZX-10R	4	(Italy) Gianluca Vizziello	8–13
(Italy) Grillini Racing Team	Kawasaki	Kawasaki ZX-10R	9	(Switzerland) Dominic Schmitter	All
(Italy) Grillini Racing Team	Kawasaki	Kawasaki ZX-10R	16	(Australia) Josh Hook	3–6
(Italy) Grillini Racing Team	Kawasaki	Kawasaki ZX-10R	19	(Thailand) Sahustchai Kaewjaturaporn	2
(Italy) Grillini Racing Team	Kawasaki	Kawasaki ZX-10R	54	(Turkey) Toprak Razgatlıoğlu	1
(Italy) Grillini Racing Team	Kawasaki	Kawasaki ZX-10R	86	(South Africa) Sheridan Morais	7
(Japan) Pata Yamaha Official WorldSBK Team	Yamaha	Yamaha YZF-R1	6	(United States) Cameron Beaubier	7
(Japan) Pata Yamaha Official WorldSBK Team	Yamaha	Yamaha YZF-R1	22	(United Kingdom) Alex Lowes	All
(Japan) Pata Yamaha Official WorldSBK Team	Yamaha	Yamaha YZF-R1	50	(France) Sylvain Guintoli	1–5, 10–13
(Japan) Pata Yamaha Official WorldSBK Team	Yamaha	Yamaha YZF-R1	59	(Italy) Niccolò Canepa	8–9
(Italy) Aruba.it Racing – Ducati	Ducati	Ducati 1199 Panigale R	7	(United Kingdom) Chaz Davies	All
(Italy) Aruba.it Racing – Ducati	Ducati	Ducati 1199 Panigale R	34	(Italy) Davide Giugliano	All
(Hungary) Team Tóth	Yamaha	Yamaha YZF-R1	10	(Hungary) Imre Tóth	1–3, 6–7, 11
(Hungary) Team Tóth	Yamaha	Yamaha YZF-R1	56	(Hungary) Péter Sebestyén	1–5, 8–13
(Hungary) Team Tóth	Yamaha	Yamaha YZF-R1	82	(Czech Republic) Karel Pešek	12
(Hungary) Team Tóth	Yamaha	Yamaha YZF-R1	119	(Poland) Paweł Szkopek	4–10, 13
(Italy) Pedercini Racing	Kawasaki	Kawasaki ZX-10R	11	(Qatar) Saeed Al Sulaiti	All
(Italy) Pedercini Racing	Kawasaki	Kawasaki ZX-10R	13	(Australia) Anthony West	6–10, 12
(Italy) Pedercini Racing	Kawasaki	Kawasaki ZX-10R	20	(France) Sylvain Barrier	1–3
(Italy) Pedercini Racing	Kawasaki	Kawasaki ZX-10R	44	(France) Lucas Mahias	4–5
(Italy) Pedercini Racing	Kawasaki	Kawasaki ZX-10R	76	(France) Matthieu Lagrive	11
(Italy) Pedercini Racing	Kawasaki	Kawasaki ZX-10R	91	(United Kingdom) Leon Haslam	13
(Italy) Barni Racing Team	Ducati	Ducati 1199 Panigale R	12	(Spain) Javier Forés	All
Yamaha Thailand Racing Team	Yamaha	Yamaha YZF-R1	14	(Thailand) Anucha Nakcharoensri	2
(Italy) IodaRacing Team	Aprilia	Aprilia RSV4 RF	15	(San Marino) Alex de Angelis	All
(Italy) IodaRacing Team	Aprilia	Aprilia RSV4 RF	32	(Italy) Lorenzo Savadori	All
(United Kingdom) Milwaukee BMW	BMW	BMW S1000RR	17	(Czech Republic) Karel Abraham	1–11, 13
(United Kingdom) Milwaukee BMW	BMW	BMW S1000RR	25	(Australia) Josh Brookes	All
(Italy) Althea BMW Racing Team	BMW	BMW S1000RR	21	(Germany) Markus Reiterberger	1–8, 10–13
(Italy) Althea BMW Racing Team	BMW	BMW S1000RR	35	(Italy) Raffaele De Rosa	9
(Italy) Althea BMW Racing Team	BMW	BMW S1000RR	35	(Italy) Raffaele De Rosa	13
(Italy) Althea BMW Racing Team	BMW	BMW S1000RR	81	(Spain) Jordi Torres	All
(Australia) Desmo Sport Ducati	Ducati	Ducati 1199 Panigale R	46	(Australia) Mike Jones	1
(France) 3ART	Yamaha	Yamaha YZF-R1	57	(France) Alex Plancassagne	11
(Netherlands) Honda World Superbike Team	Honda	Honda CBR1000RR SP	60	(Netherlands) Michael van der Mark	All
(Netherlands) Honda World Superbike Team	Honda	Honda CBR1000RR SP	69	(United States) Nicky Hayden	All
(Italy) VFT Racing	Ducati	Ducati 1199 Panigale R	61	(Italy) Fabio Menghi	8–9
(Italy) VFT Racing	Ducati	Ducati 1199 Panigale R	99	(Italy) Luca Scassa	6–7, 10–13
(Italy) VFT Racing	Ducati	Ducati 1199 Panigale R	151	(Italy) Matteo Baiocco	2–5
(France) Team ASPI	BMW	BMW S1000RR	94	(France) Matthieu Lussiana	3–4, 7, 11–12

Key
Regular rider
Wildcard rider
Replacement rider

- All entries used Pirelli tyres.

== Championship standings ==
=== Riders' championship ===
Pos.	Rider	Bike	PHI (Australia)		CHA (Thailand)		ARA (Spain)		ASS (Netherlands)		IMO (Italy)		SEP (Malaysia)		DON (United Kingdom)		MIS (Italy)		LAG (United States)		LAU (Germany)		MAG (France)		JER (Spain)		LOS (Qatar)		Pts
Pos.	Rider	Bike	R1	R2	R1	R2	R1	R2	R1	R2	R1	R2	R1	R2	R1	R2	R1	R2	R1	R2	R1	R2	R1	R2	R1	R2	R1	R2	Pts
1	(United Kingdom) Jonathan Rea	Kawasaki	1	1	1	2	2	3	1	1	2	2	2	3	3	2	1	1	1	Ret	Ret	1	**4**	**2**	3	2	**2**	**3**	498
2	(United Kingdom) Tom Sykes	Kawasaki	**5**	**6**	2	1	**3**	**2**	**Ret**	**2**	3	3	**1**	**8**	**1**	**1**	**2**	**2**	**2**	**1**	2	12	3	3	**2**	**3**	4	2	447
3	(United Kingdom) Chaz Davies	Ducati	2	10	4	3	1	1	2	5	**1**	**1**	3	4	Ret	3	4	Ret	Ret	3	**1**	**6**	1	1	1	1	1	1	445
4	(Netherlands) Michael van der Mark	Honda	3	2	**3**	**4**	Ret	7	Ret	3	7	9	7	6	8	8	3	10	4	7	6	8	2	5	5	6	9	11	267
5	(United States) Nicky Hayden	Honda	9	4	Ret	5	6	Ret	3	6	9	8	8	1	5	6	Ret	6	3	5	3	10	Ret	9	4	4	5	7	248
6	(Spain) Jordi Torres	BMW	8	7	8	8	7	5	5	15	4	7	4	13	7	11	5	7	8	6	4	Ret	14	7	8	8	8	6	213
7	(Italy) Davide Giugliano	Ducati	4	3	18	10	5	6	Ret	8	5	4	6	2	2	7	14	3	Ret	2	7	Ret	DNS	DNS	Ret	13	Ret	DNS	197
8	(United Kingdom) Leon Camier	MV Agusta	7	Ret	11	11	Ret	16	4	9	6	5	10	9	4	5	8	Ret	11	Ret	5	4	7	4	7	Ret	18	13	168
9	(Spain) Javier Forés	Ducati	Ret	DNS	14	Ret	4	4	13	10	10	10	14	11	12	14	Ret	4	7	4	10	3	8	10	Ret	Ret	6	8	151
10	(Italy) Lorenzo Savadori	Aprilia	12	Ret	10	9	10	11	6	4	8	11	Ret	14	6	4	Ret	5	6	Ret	Ret	Ret	5	6	13	10	10	12	150
11	(France) Sylvain Guintoli	Yamaha	6	5	7	6	9	10	Ret	11	DNS	DNS									9	5	9	8	6	5	3	4	141
12	(United Kingdom) Alex Lowes	Yamaha	Ret	14	6	Ret	8	9	8	7	11	6	5	Ret	DNS	DNS	13	8	5	14	8	Ret	11	19	Ret	7	7	10	131
13	(San Marino) Alex de Angelis	Aprilia	Ret	13	9	14	11	8	12	DNS	15	14	Ret	7	Ret	15	12	13	9	Ret	12	2	10	14	11	Ret	13	Ret	96
14	(Australia) Josh Brookes	BMW	10	9	15	16	13	13	11	Ret	14	13	11	12	14	9	11	14	13	Ret	14	7	12	11	10	12	15	Ret	89
15	(Spain) Román Ramos	Kawasaki	11	12	12	12	12	12	9	12	WD	WD			13	13	9	12	15	10	13	9	13	13	12	11	14	14	89
16	(Germany) Markus Reiterberger	BMW	Ret	8	5	7	14	15	7	16	13	12	Ret	10	11	16	6	Ret			Ret	Ret	17	12	9	14	Ret	15	82
17	(Australia) Anthony West	Kawasaki											9	5	10	12	10	11	12	9	11	Ret			14	9			64
18	(Czech Republic) Karel Abraham	BMW	13	11	Ret	15	15	14	Ret	14	16	Ret	12	Ret	9	Ret	Ret	15	14	12	Ret	15	16	16			Ret	Ret	33
19	(Italy) Niccolò Canepa	Yamaha															7	9	10	8									30
20	(United Kingdom) Leon Haslam	Kawasaki																									11	5	16
21	(Italy) Raffaele De Rosa	BMW																	Ret	11							12	9	16
22	(Italy) Matteo Baiocco	Ducati			13	13	Ret	17	14	Ret	12	Ret																	12
23	(France) Matthieu Lagrive	Kawasaki																					6	15					11
24	(Italy) Luca Scassa	Ducati											13	17	Ret	17					15	11	15	Ret	Ret	16	16	16	10
25	(France) Lucas Mahias	Kawasaki							10	13	DNS	DNS																	9
26	(United States) Cameron Beaubier	Yamaha													Ret	10													6
27	(Switzerland) Dominic Schmitter	Kawasaki	16	16	19	19	18	19	DNQ	20	Ret	15	16	19	15	18	17	16	16	13	16	Ret	Ret	DNS	17	18	19	18	5
28	(Italy) Gianluca Vizziello	Kawasaki									DNQ	Ret	18	16			20	Ret	NC	17	19	13	21	17	16	15	21	17	4
29	(Poland) Paweł Szkopek	Yamaha							17	18	18	17	Ret	18	16	19	15	20	18	Ret	17	14					DNS	20	3
30	(Australia) Mike Jones	Ducati	14	Ret																									2
31	(Australia) Joshua Hook	Kawasaki					Ret	Ret	16	DNS	17	Ret	15	15															2
32	(France) Sylvain Barrier	Kawasaki	15	15	16	17	16	Ret																					2
33	(Hungary) Péter Sebestyén	Yamaha	18	18	20	20	19	20	DNQ	19	Ret	DNS					16	18	17	16	18	16	19	18	15	Ret	20	19	1
34	(Qatar) Saeed Al Sulaiti	Kawasaki	17	17	17	Ret	Ret	21	DNQ	DNQ	Ret	16	17	20	17	Ret	19	19	Ret	15	Ret	Ret	18	Ret	Ret	Ret	17	Ret	1
35	(France) Matthieu Lussiana	BMW					17	18	15	17					Ret	Ret							20	Ret	Ret	17			1
	(Italy) Fabio Menghi	Ducati															18	17	DNS	DNS									0
	(Hungary) Imre Tóth	Yamaha	19	19	22	21	20	22					19	21	18	Ret							Ret	21					0
	(Czech Republic) Karel Pešek	Yamaha																							18	19			0
	(Thailand) Anucha Nakcharoensri	Yamaha			23	18																							0
	(France) Alex Plancassagne	Yamaha																					22	20					0
	(Thailand) Sahustchai Kaewjaturaporn	Kawasaki			21	22																							0
	(South Africa) Sheridan Morais	Kawasaki													DNS	DNS													0
	(Turkey) Toprak Razgatlıoğlu	Kawasaki	DNS	DNS																									0
Pos.	Rider	Bike	PHI (Australia)		CHA (Thailand)		ARA (Spain)		ASS (Netherlands)		IMO (Italy)		SEP (Malaysia)		DON (United Kingdom)		MIS (Italy)		LAG (United States)		LAU (Germany)		MAG (France)		JER (Spain)		LOS (Qatar)		Pts

Colour	Result
Gold	Winner
Silver	Second place
Bronze	Third place
Green	Points classification
Blue	Non-points classification
Blue	Non-classified finish (NC)
Purple	Retired, not classified (Ret)
Red	Did not qualify (DNQ)
Red	Did not pre-qualify (DNPQ)
Black	Disqualified (DSQ)
White	Did not start (DNS)
White	Withdrew (WD)
White	Race cancelled (C)
Blank	Did not practice (DNP)
Blank	Did not arrive (DNA)
Blank	Excluded (EX)

**Bold** – Pole position
Italics – Fastest lap

=== Teams' championship ===
Pos.	Team	Bike No.	PHI (Australia)		CHA (Thailand)		ARA (Spain)		ASS (Netherlands)		IMO (Italy)		SEP (Malaysia)		DON (United Kingdom)		MIS (Italy)		LAG (United States)		LAU (Germany)		MAG (France)		JER (Spain)		LOS (Qatar)		Pts.
Pos.	Team	Bike No.	R1	R2	R1	R2	R1	R2	R1	R2	R1	R2	R1	R2	R1	R2	R1	R2	R1	R2	R1	R2	R1	R2	R1	R2	R1	R2	Pts.
1	(Japan) Kawasaki Racing Team	1	1	1	1	2	2	3	1	1	2	2	2	3	3	2	1	1	1	Ret	Ret	1	**4**	**2**	3	2	**2**	**3**	945
1	(Japan) Kawasaki Racing Team	66	**5**	**6**	2	1	**3**	**2**	**Ret**	**2**	3	3	**1**	**8**	**1**	**1**	**2**	**2**	**2**	**1**	2	12	3	3	**2**	**3**	4	2	945
2	(Italy) Aruba.it Racing – Ducati	7	2	10	4	3	1	1	2	5	**1**	**1**	3	4	Ret	3	4	Ret	Ret	3	**1**	**6**	1	1	1	1	1	1	642
2	(Italy) Aruba.it Racing – Ducati	34	4	3	18	10	5	6	Ret	8	5	4	6	2	2	7	14	3	Ret	2	7	Ret	DNS	DNS	Ret	13	Ret	DNS	642
3	(Netherlands) Honda World Superbike Team	60	3	2	**3**	**4**	Ret	7	Ret	3	7	9	7	6	8	8	3	10	4	7	6	8	2	5	5	6	9	11	515
3	(Netherlands) Honda World Superbike Team	69	9	4	Ret	5	6	Ret	3	6	9	8	8	1	5	6	Ret	6	3	5	3	10	Ret	9	4	4	5	7	515
4	(Italy) Althea BMW Racing Team	81	8	7	8	8	7	5	5	15	4	7	4	13	7	11	5	7	8	6	4	Ret	14	7	8	8	8	6	311
4	(Italy) Althea BMW Racing Team	21	Ret	8	5	7	14	15	7	16	13	12	Ret	10	11	16	6	Ret			Ret	Ret	17	12	9	14	Ret	15	311
4	(Italy) Althea BMW Racing Team	35																	Ret	11							12	9	311
5	(Japan) Pata Yamaha Official WorldSBK Team	50	6	5	7	6	9	10	Ret	11	DNS	DNS									9	5	9	8	6	5	3	4	308
5	(Japan) Pata Yamaha Official WorldSBK Team	22	Ret	14	6	Ret	8	9	8	7	11	6	5	Ret	DNS	DNS	13	8	5	14	8	Ret	11	19	Ret	7	7	10	308
5	(Japan) Pata Yamaha Official WorldSBK Team	59															7	9	10	8									308
5	(Japan) Pata Yamaha Official WorldSBK Team	6													Ret	10													308
6	(Italy) IodaRacing Team	32	12	Ret	10	9	10	11	6	4	8	11	Ret	14	6	4	Ret	5	6	Ret	Ret	Ret	5	6	13	10	10	12	246
6	(Italy) IodaRacing Team	15	Ret	13	9	14	11	8	12	DNS	15	14	Ret	7	Ret	15	12	13	9	Ret	12	2	10	14	11	Ret	13	Ret	246
7	(Italy) MV Agusta Reparto Corse	2	7	Ret	11	11	Ret	16	4	9	6	5	10	9	4	5	8	Ret	11	Ret	5	4	7	4	7	Ret	18	13	168
8	(Italy) Barni Racing Team	12	Ret	DNS	14	Ret	4	4	13	10	10	10	14	11	12	14	Ret	4	7	4	10	3	8	10	Ret	Ret	6	8	151
9	(United Kingdom) Milwaukee BMW	25	10	9	15	16	13	13	11	Ret	14	13	11	12	14	9	11	14	13	Ret	14	7	12	11	10	12	15	Ret	122
9	(United Kingdom) Milwaukee BMW	17	13	11	Ret	15	15	14	Ret	14	16	Ret	12	Ret	9	Ret	Ret	15	14	12	Ret	15	16	16			Ret	Ret	122
10	(Italy) Pedercini Racing	13											9	5	10	12	10	11	12	9	11	Ret			14	9			103
10	(Italy) Pedercini Racing	91																									11	5	103
10	(Italy) Pedercini Racing	76																					6	15					103
10	(Italy) Pedercini Racing	44							10	13	DNS	DNS																	103
10	(Italy) Pedercini Racing	20	15	15	16	17	16	Ret																					103
10	(Italy) Pedercini Racing	11	17	17	17	Ret	Ret	21	DNQ	DNQ	Ret	16	17	20	17	Ret	19	19	Ret	15	Ret	Ret	18	Ret	Ret	Ret	17	Ret	103
11	(Italy) Team GoEleven	40	11	12	12	12	12	12	9	12	WD	WD			13	13	9	12	15	10	13	9	13	13	12	11	14	14	89
11	(Italy) Team GoEleven	4									DNQ	Ret	18	16															89
12	(Italy) VFT Racing	151			13	13	Ret	17	14	Ret	12	Ret																	22
12	(Italy) VFT Racing	99											13	17	Ret	17					15	11	15	Ret	Ret	16	16	16	22
12	(Italy) VFT Racing	61															18	17	DNS	DNS									22
13	(Italy) Grillini Racing Team	9	16	16	19	19	18	19	DNQ	20	Ret	15	16	19	15	18	17	16	16	13	16	Ret	Ret	DNS	17	18	19	18	11
13	(Italy) Grillini Racing Team	4															20	Ret	NC	17	19	13	21	17	16	15	21	17	11
13	(Italy) Grillini Racing Team	16					Ret	Ret	16	DNS	17	Ret	15	15															11
13	(Italy) Grillini Racing Team	19			21	22																							11
13	(Italy) Grillini Racing Team	54	DNS	DNS																									11
13	(Italy) Grillini Racing Team	86													DNS	DNS													11
14	(Hungary) Team Tóth	119							17	18	18	17	Ret	18	16	19	15	20	18	Ret	17	14					DNS	20	4
14	(Hungary) Team Tóth	56	18	18	20	20	19	20	DNQ	19	Ret	DNS					16	18	17	16	18	16	19	18	15	Ret	20	19	4
14	(Hungary) Team Tóth	10	19	19	22	21	20	22					19	21	18	Ret							Ret	21					4
14	(Hungary) Team Tóth	82																							18	19			4
15	(Australia) Desmo Sport Ducati	46	14	Ret																									2
16	(France) Team ASPI	94					17	18	15	17					Ret	Ret							20	Ret	Ret	17			1
	Yamaha Thailand Racing Team	14			23	18																							0
	(France) 3ART	57																					22	20					0
Pos.	Team	Bike No.	PHI (Australia)		CHA (Thailand)		ARA (Spain)		ASS (Netherlands)		IMO (Italy)		SEP (Malaysia)		DON (United Kingdom)		MIS (Italy)		LAG (United States)		LAU (Germany)		MAG (France)		JER (Spain)		LOS (Qatar)		Pts.

=== Manufacturers' championship ===
Pos.	Manufacturer	PHI (Australia)		CHA (Thailand)		ARA (Spain)		ASS (Netherlands)		IMO (Italy)		SEP (Malaysia)		DON (United Kingdom)		MIS (Italy)		LAG (United States)		LAU (Germany)		MAG (France)		JER (Spain)		LOS (Qatar)		Pts
Pos.	Manufacturer	R1	R2	R1	R2	R1	R2	R1	R2	R1	R2	R1	R2	R1	R2	R1	R2	R1	R2	R1	R2	R1	R2	R1	R2	R1	R2	Pts
1	(Japan) Kawasaki	1	1	1	1	2	2	1	1	2	2	1	3	1	1	1	1	1	1	2	1	3	2	2	2	2	2	582
2	(Italy) Ducati	2	3	4	3	1	1	2	5	1	1	3	2	2	3	4	3	7	2	1	3	1	1	1	1	1	1	517
3	(Japan) Honda	3	2	3	4	6	7	3	3	7	8	7	1	5	6	3	6	3	5	3	8	2	5	4	4	5	7	342
4	(Germany) BMW	8	7	5	7	7	5	5	14	4	7	4	10	7	9	5	7	8	6	4	7	12	7	8	8	8	6	234
5	(Japan) Yamaha	6	5	6	6	8	9	8	7	11	6	5	18	16	10	7	8	5	8	8	5	9	8	6	5	3	4	225
6	(Italy) Aprilia	12	13	9	9	10	8	6	4	8	11	Ret	7	6	4	12	5	6	Ret	12	2	5	6	11	10	10	12	194
7	(Italy) MV Agusta	7	Ret	11	11	Ret	16	4	9	6	5	10	9	4	5	8	Ret	11	Ret	5	4	7	4	7	Ret	18	13	168
Pos.	Manufacturer	PHI (Australia)		CHA (Thailand)		ARA (Spain)		ASS (Netherlands)		IMO (Italy)		SEP (Malaysia)		DON (United Kingdom)		MIS (Italy)		LAG (United States)		LAU (Germany)		MAG (France)		JER (Spain)		LOS (Qatar)		Pts
