= Alex Lowes =

British motorcycle racer (born 1990)

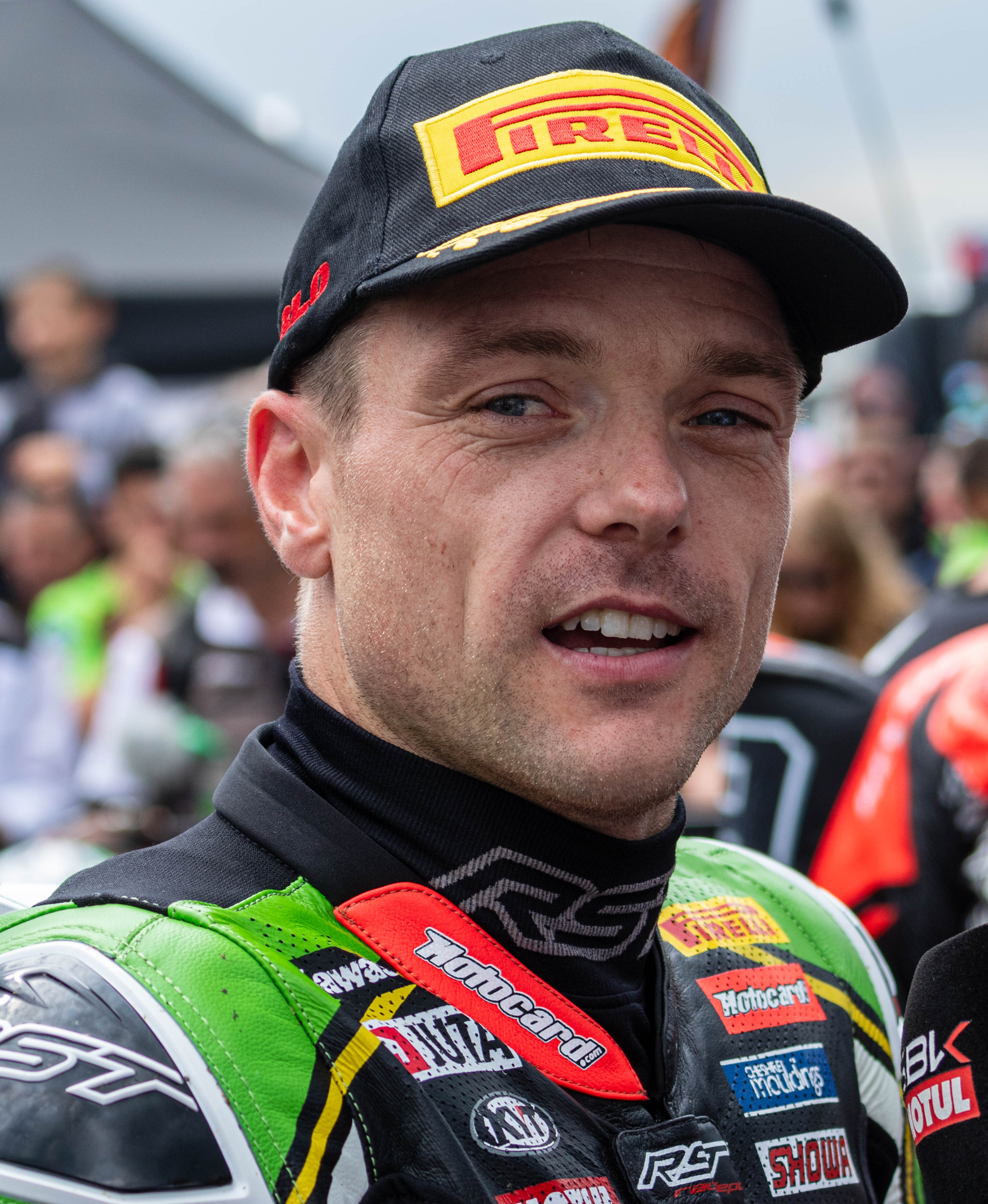
- Lowes in 2024
- Nationality: British
- Born: 14 September 1990 (age 36); Lincoln, Lincolnshire, England
- Current team: Bimota by Kawasaki Racing Team
- Bike number: 22
Motorcycle racing career statistics
MotoGP World Championship
Active years	2016
Manufacturers	Yamaha
Championships	0
2016 championship position	24th (3 pts)
Starts / Wins / Podiums / Poles / F. laps / Points; 2 / 0 / 0 / 0 / 0 / 3
125cc World Championship
Active years	2006
Manufacturers	Honda
Championships	0
2006 championship position	NC (0 pts)
Starts / Wins / Podiums / Poles / F. laps / Points; 1 / 0 / 0 / 0 / 0 / 0
Superbike World Championship
Active years	2011, 2014–
Manufacturers	Honda (2011); Suzuki (2014–2015); Yamaha (2016–2019); Kawasaki (2020–2024); Bimota (2025–)
Championships	0
2026 championship position	5th (259 pts)
Starts / Wins / Podiums / Poles / F. laps / Points; 360 / 4 / 51 / 2 / 9 / 2642
Supersport World Championship
Active years	2010
Manufacturers	Yamaha
Championships	0
2010 championship position	NC (0 pts)
Starts / Wins / Podiums / Poles / F. laps / Points; 1 / 0 / 0 / 0 / 0 / 0
British Superbike Championship
Active years	2010–2013
Manufacturers	KTM, Honda, Kawasaki, Yamaha
Championships	1 (2013)
2013 championship position	1st (643 pts)
Starts / Wins / Podiums / Poles / F. laps / Points; 77 / 10 / 26 / 12 / 15 / 1288

Alexander Thomas Lowes (born 14 September 1990) is an English motorcycle racer. He signed in October 2019 for the Kawasaki Racing Team in Superbike World Championship as team-mate to multi-world champion Jonathan Rea.

Lowes competed in World Superbike on a Yamaha YZF-R1 for Pata Yamaha Official WorldSBK Team, but learned of the loss of his position from 2020 to Toprak Razgatlioglu in August 2019.

Lowes won 2016, 2017 and 2018 Suzuka 8 Hours and was the 2013 title holder of the British Superbike Championship riding a Honda CBR1000RR for Samsung Honda. He previously raced in the British Supersport Championship and the FIM Superstock 1000 Cup. He is the identical twin brother of fellow rider Sam Lowes.

== Career ==
=== Early career ===
Born in Lincoln, England, Lowes began racing motorcycles at the age of six years old. In 1998, he switched to motocross and raced there until 2001, racing in various championships around England. In 2002, he made the switch to road racing in the JRA Championship, racing a Cagiva finishing second overall. In 2003, he raced in the Aprilia Superteen Championship despite only being 12 years old at the beginning of the season. Despite everybody else taking part in the championship being between the age of 13 to 19 years old, Lowes managed to finished fourth overall.

In 2004, Lowes made the switch to the GP125 MRO Championship, he also raced in two events in the German championship, and one event in the British Championship. At the end of the year, he finished runner-up in the GP125 championship, including a win in the Pembrey Circuit at Wales. He switched to the British 125cc championship the following year, racing there until 2006, he also made his debut in the 125cc World Championship racing as a wildcard in Donington Park but he did not finish the race. In 2007, he switched to the British Supersport Championship riding a Honda CBR600RR, where he was the youngest racer in the Championship at the time, making some good results like a tenth place in Thruxton and Croft, finishing behind various experienced racers in the championship.

=== Superstock Championship ===
For 2008, Lowes switched to the European Superstock 600 championship riding a Kawasaki for Kawasaki Italia. During the year, he had a best finish of second, finishing 16th overall. In 2009, he switched to the FIM Superstock 1000 Championship riding a MV Agusta for the factory, but he struggled during the season, finishing in the points twice, and he and the team missed the final race of the season, due to MV Agusta owners Harley-Davidson putting the marque for sale. His struggles continued for 2010, when he signed with a new Suzuki team, but the team folded before the season began. After this, he received an offer from Seton Tuning Yamaha team and he finished 12th in the final standings with 41 points, despite missing three races. He also made his British Superbike debut riding a KTM in the then new EVO class, where he finished 35th in the points scoring one point. He also made his debut as Wildcard in the World Supersport Championship riding a Yamaha, for Silverstone but he retired due to an accident in the race.

=== British Superbike Championship ===
In 2011, Lowes raced for four different teams in the year, he began the year with Team WFR in the EVO class riding a Honda, after three rounds with a best finish of fifth, he replaced Stuart Easton in the MSS Colchester Kawasaki team he had a best finish of seventh with the team, later he replaced an injured Jonathan Rea in Ten Kate Racing for the Brno and Silverstone rounds, He had a best finish of 15th in Brno in Race 1, but he retired in the next three races, returning to the British Championship, he lost his ride with the MSS Colchester Kawasaki team, he finished the season with the Motorpoint Yamaha team finishing the season with 60 points with a best finish of fifth with WFR Honda and seventh with Motorpoint Yamaha.

For 2012, Lowes returned to race with Team WFR in the championship, he had a highly successful season, finishing fourth making a double win at Silverstone Circuit and entering the championship Showdown he finished the season with 584 points.

For 2013, Lowes joined Samsung Honda, the works team for Honda in BSB. He was highly successful, winning the championship over three-times champion Shane Byrne at the last race at Brands Hatch in October 2013. He then announced that he would be leaving BSB in 2014 to join the World Superbike Championship, resulting in Honda closing down their BSB team for 2014.

== Career statistics ==
=== Career highlights ===
- 2008 - 16th, European Superstock 600 Championship, Kawasaki ZX-6R
- 2009 - 26th, FIM Superstock 1000 Cup, MV Agusta F4 312 R

=== European Superstock 600 ===
==== Races by year ====
(key) (Races in bold indicate pole position, races in italics indicate fastest lap)

Year	Bike	1	2	3	4	5	6	7	8	9	10	Pos	Pts
2008	Kawasaki	VAL; 25	ASS; Ret	MNZ; Ret	NÜR; 27	MIS; 21	BRN; 26	BRA; 20	DON; 2	MAG; 21	POR	16th	20

=== FIM Superstock 1000 Cup ===
==== Races by year ====
(key) (Races in bold indicate pole position) (Races in italics indicate fastest lap)

Year	Bike	1	2	3	4	5	6	7	8	9	10	Pos	Pts
2009	MV Agusta	VAL; Ret	NED; Ret	MNZ; Ret	SMR; 25	DON; Ret	BRN; 13	NŰR; Ret	IMO; 11	MAG; 16	ALG	26th	8

=== British Supersport Championship ===
(key) (Races in bold indicate pole position, races in italics indicate fastest lap)

Year	Bike	1	2	3	4	5	6	7	8	9	10	11	12	Pos	Pts
2010	Yamaha	BHI	THR; Ret	OUL	CAD	MAL; Ret	KNO; 5	SNE; 10	BHGP; 16	CAD; Ret	CRO; 4	SIL; 7	OUL; 14	12th	41

=== British Superbike Championship ===
==== Races by year ====
(key)

Year	Bike	1		2		3			4		5		6			7			8			9			10		11		12			Pos	Pts
Year	Bike	R1	R2	R1	R2	R1	R2	R3	R1	R2	R1	R2	R1	R2	R3	R1	R2	R3	R1	R2	R3	R1	R2	R3	R1	R2	R1	R2	R1	R2	R3	Pos	Pts
2010	KTM	BHI	BHI	THR	THR	OUL; Ret	OUL; 20		CAD; DNS	CAD; 15	MAL	MAL	KNO	KNO		SNE	SNE	SNE	BHGP	BHGP	BHGP	CAD	CAD		CRO	CRO	SIL	SIL	OUL	OUL	OUL	35th	1
2011	Honda	BHI; 12	BHI; 12	OUL; 12	OUL; 14	CRO; 5	CRO; 11																									20th	60
2011	Kawasaki								THR; 7	THR; Ret	KNO; Ret	KNO; DNS	SNE; 16	SNE; DNS		OUL; 13	OUL; C		BHGP; 21	BHGP; 20	BHGP; 16	CAD; 12	CAD; Ret	CAD; Ret								20th	60
2011	Yamaha																								DON; 16	DON; Ret	SIL; 7	SIL; 12	BHGP; 15	BHGP; Ret	BHGP; DNS	20th	60
2012	Honda	BHI; 17	BHI; C	THR; 22	THR; 8	OUL; DNS	OUL; 10	OUL; 10	SNE; 5	SNE; 6	KNO; 9	KNO; 8	OUL; Ret	OUL; 9	OUL; 6	BHGP; 7	BHGP; 6		CAD; 2	CAD; 4		DON; 6	DON; 5		ASS; 3	ASS; 3	SIL; 1	SIL; 1	BHGP; Ret	BHGP; Ret	BHGP; Ret	4th	584
2013	Honda	BHI; 2	BHI; 2	THR; 3	THR; 2	OUL; 1	OUL; 3		KNO; Ret	KNO; 4	SNE; 1	SNE; 2	BHGP; 2	BHGP; 3		OUL; 3	OUL; Ret	OUL; 3	CAD; 1	CAD; 1		DON; 1	DON; 1		ASS; 1	ASS; DSQ	SIL; 1	SIL; 2	BHGP; 2	BHGP; Ret	BHGP; 2	1st	643

=== Supersport World Championship ===
==== Races by year ====
(key) (Races in bold indicate pole position; races in italics indicate fastest lap)

Year	Bike	1	2	3	4	5	6	7	8	9	10	11	12	13	Pos	Pts
2010	Yamaha	AUS	POR	SPA	NED	ITA	RSA	USA	SMR	CZE	GBR; Ret	GER	ITA	FRA	NC	0

=== Superbike World Championship ===
==== By season ====
Season	Motorcycle	Team	Race	Win	Podium	Pole	FLap	Pts	Plcd
2011	Honda CBR1000RR	Castrol Honda	4	0	0	0	0	1	33rd
2014	Suzuki GSX-R1000	Voltcom Crescent Suzuki	24	0	2	0	2	139	11th
2015	Suzuki GSX-R1000	Voltcom Crescent Suzuki	26	0	1	0	0	135	10th
2016	Yamaha YZF-R1	Pata Yamaha WorldSBK Official Team	24	0	0	0	1	131	12th
2017	Yamaha YZF-R1	Pata Yamaha WorldSBK Official Team	26	0	4	0	0	242	5th
2018	Yamaha YZF-R1	Pata Yamaha WorldSBK Official Team	25	1	4	1	0	248	6th
2019	Yamaha YZF-R1	Pata Yamaha WorldSBK Official Team	37	0	9	0	2	341	**3rd**
2020	Kawasaki Ninja ZX-10RR	Kawasaki Racing Team WorldSBK	24	1	4	0	1	189	6th
2021	Kawasaki Ninja ZX-10RR	Kawasaki Racing Team WorldSBK	30	0	5	0	0	213	8th
2022	Kawasaki Ninja ZX-10RR	Kawasaki Racing Team WorldSBK	35	0	4	0	2	272	6th
2023	Kawasaki Ninja ZX-10RR	Kawasaki Racing Team WorldSBK	30	0	1	0	0	149	11th
2024	Kawasaki Ninja ZX-10RR	Kawasaki Racing Team WorldSBK	35	2	12	1	1	316	4th
2025	Bimota KB998	Bimota by Kawasaki Racing Team	34	0	4	0	0	218	6th
2026	Bimota KB998	Bimota by Kawasaki Racing Team	6	0	1	0	0	259	5th
Total			**360**	**4**	**51**	**2**	**9**	**2853**	

==== Races by year ====
(key) (Races in bold indicate pole position; races in italics indicate fastest lap)

Year	Bike	1		2		3		4		5		6		7		8		9		10		11		12		13		Pos	Pts
Year	Bike	R1	R2	R1	R2	R1	R2	R1	R2	R1	R2	R1	R2	R1	R2	R1	R2	R1	R2	R1	R2	R1	R2	R1	R2	R1	R2	Pos	Pts
2011	Honda	AUS	AUS	EUR	EUR	NED	NED	ITA	ITA	USA	USA	SMR	SMR	SPA	SPA	CZE; 15	CZE; Ret	GBR; Ret	GBR; Ret	GER	GER	ITA	ITA	FRA	FRA	POR	POR	33rd	1
2014	Suzuki	AUS; Ret	AUS; 13	SPA; 10	SPA; Ret	NED; 9	NED; 2	ITA; 8	ITA; 10	GBR; 3	GBR; 9	MAL; Ret	MAL; 9	ITA; Ret	ITA; 8	POR; 6	POR; 4	USA; 8	USA; Ret	SPA; Ret	SPA; 9	FRA; Ret	FRA; Ret	QAT; 10	QAT; 9			11th	139
2015	Suzuki	AUS; 9	AUS; Ret	THA; 7	THA; 3	SPA; NC	SPA; 14	NED; Ret	NED; 9	ITA; 12	ITA; 10	GBR; 6	GBR; 6	POR; 10	POR; 13	ITA; 12	ITA; Ret	USA; 6	USA; Ret	MAL; 6	MAL; 8	SPA; 7	SPA; 18	FRA; 8	FRA; 10	QAT; Ret	QAT; Ret	10th	135
2016	Yamaha	AUS; Ret	AUS; 14	THA; 6	THA; Ret	SPA; 8	SPA; 9	NED; 8	NED; 7	ITA; 11	ITA; 6	MAL; 5	MAL; Ret	GBR; DNS	GBR; DNS	ITA; 13	ITA; 8	USA; 5	USA; 14	GER; 8	GER; Ret	FRA; 11	FRA; 19	SPA; Ret	SPA; 7	QAT; 7	QAT; 10	12th	131
2017	Yamaha	AUS; 4	AUS; 4	THA; 6	THA; 4	SPA; 4	SPA; 13	NED; Ret	NED; 5	ITA; 8	ITA; 6	GBR; 3	GBR; 5	ITA; 2	ITA; Ret	USA; Ret	USA; 9	GER; 6	GER; 5	POR; 18	POR; Ret	FRA; 5	FRA; 2	SPA; 4	SPA; 4	QAT; Ret	QAT; 3	5th	242
2018	Yamaha	AUS; 6	AUS; 5	THA; 5	THA; 3	SPA; 7	SPA; 4	**NED**; 12	NED; 14	ITA; 10	ITA; 6	GBR; 4	GBR; 4	CZE; 5	CZE; 1	USA; 3	USA; 4	ITA; Ret	ITA; 6	POR; 10	POR; 11	FRA; 18	FRA; 7	ARG; 7	ARG; 6	QAT; 3	QAT; C	6th	248

Year	Bike	1			2			3			4			5			6			7			8			9			10			11			12			13			Pos	Pts
Year	Bike	R1	SR	R2	R1	SR	R2	R1	SR	R2	R1	SR	R2	R1	SR	R2	R1	SR	R2	R1	SR	R2	R1	SR	R2	R1	SR	R2	R1	SR	R2	R1	SR	R2	R1	SR	R2	R1	SR	R2	Pos	Pts
2019	Yamaha	AUS; 4	AUS; 4	AUS; 5	THA; 3	THA; 3	THA; 3	SPA; 4	SPA; 3	SPA; 5	NED; 4	NED; C	NED; 4	ITA; 7	ITA; 5	ITA; C	SPA; 16	SPA; Ret	SPA; 14	ITA; Ret	ITA; 2	ITA; 4	GBR; 5	GBR; 6	GBR; 4	USA; 5	USA; 6	USA; 4	POR; 7	POR; 3	POR; 4	FRA; 6	FRA; 6	FRA; 3	ARG; 5	ARG; 5	ARG; 6	QAT; 3	QAT; 3	QAT; 4	3rd	341
2020	Kawasaki	AUS; 2	AUS; 4	AUS; 1	SPA; 9	SPA; 7	SPA; 5	POR; 4	POR; 4	POR; Ret	SPA; Ret	SPA; 6	SPA; 9	SPA; 6	SPA; 6	SPA; 5	SPA; 9	SPA; 7	SPA; 8	FRA; 3	FRA; 2	FRA; 9	POR; 6	POR; Ret	POR; Ret																6th	189
2021	Kawasaki	SPA; 2	SPA; 2	SPA; 3	POR; 19	POR; 6	POR; 4	ITA; 5	ITA; 5	ITA; 6	GBR; 3	GBR; 14	GBR; 6	NED; Ret	NED; 6	NED; 7	CZE; 13	CZE; 7	CZE; 6	SPA; 5	SPA; 5	SPA; 6	FRA; Ret	FRA; 3	FRA; Ret	SPA; 6	SPA; 4	SPA; Ret	SPA; 9	SPA; Ret	SPA; DNS	POR; DNS	POR; DNS	POR; DNS	ARG; 4	ARG; 9	ARG; DNS	INA; DNS	INA; C	INA; DNS	8th	213
2022	Kawasaki	SPA; Ret	SPA; 6	SPA; 5	NED; Ret	NED; Ret	NED; 4	POR; 7	POR; 6	POR; 4	ITA; 5	ITA; 8	ITA; 8	GBR; 3	GBR; 5	GBR; 6	CZE; 9	CZE; Ret	CZE; DNS	FRA; 4	FRA; 4	FRA; 4	SPA; 7	SPA; 3	SPA; Ret	POR; 5	POR; 4	POR; 5	ARG; 6	ARG; 5	ARG; 4	INA; 9	INA; 7	INA; 9	AUS; 3	AUS; 4	AUS; 3				6th	272
2023	Kawasaki	AUS; Ret	AUS; 4	AUS; Ret	INA; 10	INA; 3	INA; 13	NED; 7	NED; 4	NED; 9	SPA; Ret	SPA; 5	SPA; 4	ITA; 7	ITA; 6	ITA; Ret	GBR; 6	GBR; 6	GBR; 6	ITA; 9	ITA; 7	ITA; Ret	CZE; 9	CZE; 7	CZE; 14	FRA; 8	FRA; Ret	FRA; DNS	SPA	SPA	SPA	POR; 5	POR; Ret	POR; DNS	SPA; 7	SPA; Ret	SPA; DNS				11th	149
2024	Kawasaki	AUS; 4	AUS; 1	AUS; 1	SPA; 6	SPA; 5	SPA; 6	NED; 5	NED; 3	NED; Ret	ITA; 5	ITA; 3	ITA; 4	GBR; 2	GBR; 5	GBR; 3	CZE; Ret	CZE; 3	CZE; 9	POR; 5	POR; 3	POR; 3	**FRA**; Ret	**FRA**; 2	FRA; 4	ITA; 20	ITA; 2	ITA; 5	SPA; 7	SPA; Ret	SPA; DNS	POR; 4	POR; 6	POR; 12	SPA; 4	SPA; 3	SPA; 5				4th	316
2025	Bimota	AUS; 4	AUS; 4	AUS; 8	POR; Ret	POR; 13	POR; Ret	NED; 11	NED; 11	NED; 6	ITA; 11	ITA; 12	ITA; 11	CZE; 4	CZE; 7	CZE; 15	EMI; 4	EMI; 2	EMI; 14	GBR; Ret	GBR; DNS	GBR; DNS	HUN; 6	HUN; 12	HUN; 6	FRA; 3	FRA; 3	FRA; 3	ARA; 5	ARA; 6	ARA; 6	POR; 5	POR; 15	POR; 4	SPA; 6	SPA; 5	SPA; 6				6th	218
2026	Bimota	AUS; 7	AUS; 3	AUS; Ret	POR; 4	POR; 4	POR; 4	NED; 5	NED; 5	NED; 11	HUN; 6	HUN; 7	HUN; Ret	CZE; 7	CZE; 9	CZE; 7	ARA; 4	ARA; 5	ARA; 4	EMI; 5	EMI; Ret	EMI; 4	GBR; 7	GBR; 4	GBR; 5	FRA; 5	FRA; 5	FRA; 13	ITA; 6	ITA; 6	ITA; 5	POR; 5	POR; 11	POR; Ret	SPA; 8	SPA; 5	SPA; 7				5th	259

=== Grand Prix motorcycle racing ===
==== By season ====
Season	Class	Motorcycle	Team	Race	Win	Podium	Pole	FLap	Pts	Plcd
2006	125cc	Honda	Double Vision Racing	1	0	0	0	0	0	NC
2016	MotoGP	Yamaha	Monster Yamaha Tech 3	2	0	0	0	0	3	24th
Total				**3**	**0**	**0**	**0**	**0**	**3**	

==== Races by year ====
(key) (Races in bold indicate pole position, races in italics indicate fastest lap)

Year	Class	Bike	1	2	3	4	5	6	7	8	9	10	11	12	13	14	15	16	17	18	Pos	Pts
2006	125cc	Honda	SPA	QAT	TUR	CHN	FRA	ITA	CAT	NED	GBR; Ret	GER	CZE	MAL	AUS	JPN	POR	VAL			NC	0
2016	MotoGP	Yamaha	QAT	ARG	AME	SPA	FRA	ITA	CAT	NED	GER	AUT	CZE	GBR; 13	RSM; Ret	ARA; DNS	JPN	AUS	MAL	VAL	24th	3

=== Suzuka 8 Hours results ===
Year	Team	Co-riders	Bike	Pos
2015	(Japan) Yoshimura Suzuki Shell Advance	(Japan) Takuya Tsuda (Australia) Josh Waters	Suzuki GSX-R1000	5th
2016	(Japan) Yamaha Factory Racing Team	(Spain) Pol Espargaró (Japan) Katsuyuki Nakasuga	Yamaha YZF-R1	1st
2017	(Japan) Yamaha Factory Racing Team	(Netherlands) Michael van der Mark (Japan) Katsuyuki Nakasuga	Yamaha YZF-R1	1st
2018	(Japan) Yamaha Factory Racing Team	(Netherlands) Michael van der Mark (Japan) Katsuyuki Nakasuga	Yamaha YZF-R1	1st
2019	(Japan) Yamaha Factory Racing Team	(Netherlands) Michael van der Mark (Japan) Katsuyuki Nakasuga	Yamaha YZF-R1	2nd
