= Michael van der Mark =

Dutch motorcycle racer (born 1992)

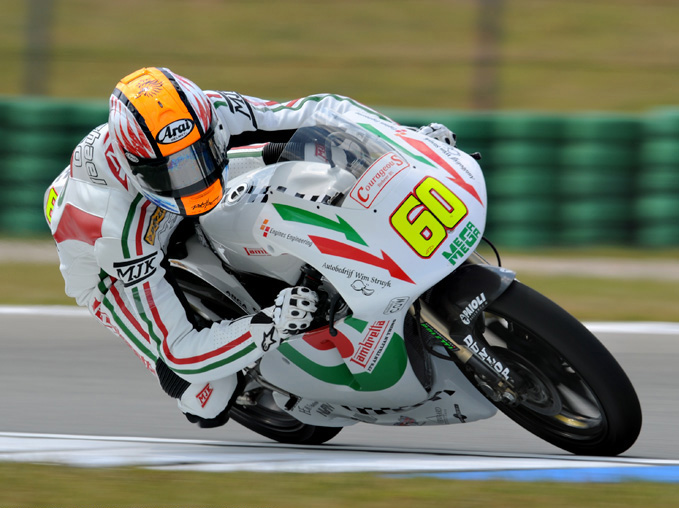
- Van der Mark at the 2010 Dutch TT
- Nationality: Dutch
- Born: 26 October 1992 (age 34); Gouda, Netherlands
- Current team: ROKiT BMW Motorrad WorldSBK
- Bike number: 60
- Website: michaelvandermark.com
Motorcycle racing career statistics
MotoGP World Championship
Active years	2017
Manufacturers	Yamaha
Championships	0
2017 championship position	28th (0 pts)
Starts / Wins / Podiums / Poles / F. laps / Points; 2 / 0 / 0 / 0 / 0 / 0
Moto2 World Championship
Active years	2011
Manufacturers	Ten Kate
Championships	0
2011 championship position	NC (0 pts)
Starts / Wins / Podiums / Poles / F. laps / Points; 1 / 0 / 0 / 0 / 0 / 0
125cc World Championship
Active years	2008–2010
Manufacturers	Honda (2008–2009); Aprilia (2010); Lambretta (2010)
Championships	0
2010 championship position	NC (0 pts)
Starts / Wins / Podiums / Poles / F. laps / Points; 9 / 0 / 0 / 0 / 0 / 0
Superbike World Championship
Active years	2015–2026
Manufacturers	Honda (2015–2016); Yamaha (2017–2020); BMW (2021–2026)
Championships	0
2026 championship position	20th (23 pts)
Starts / Wins / Podiums / Poles / F. laps / Points; 324 / 6 / 42 / 1 / 5 / 2304
Supersport World Championship
Active years	2012–2014
Manufacturers	Honda
Championships	1 (2014)
2014 championship position	1st (230 pts)
Starts / Wins / Podiums / Poles / F. laps / Points; 22 / 6 / 13 / 2 / 3 / 360

Michael van der Mark (born 26 October 1992) is a motorcycle road racer based in the Netherlands. He competes in the Superbike World Championship with a BMW M1000RR. He was the 2012 European Superstock 600 champion. In 2013 and 2014, he won the Suzuka 8 Hours with Takumi Takahashi and Leon Haslam in the Endurance FIM World Championship on a Honda CBR1000RRW. In 2014, he won the Supersport World Championship with PATA Honda.

In 2015, van der Mark moved to the Superbike level continuing with the Pata Honda team. In 2017, he made his debut in the MotoGP class of Grand Prix motorcycle racing at Sepang as a replacement for ill rider Jonas Folger in the Tech 3 satellite Yamaha team. In the same year, he won his third Suzuka 8 Hours, this time on a Yamaha YZF-R1 with Alex Lowes and Katsuyuki Nakasuga.

== Career statistics ==
2010 - 30th, European Superstock 600 Championship, Honda CBR600RR
2011 - 3rd, European Superstock 600 Championship, Honda CBR600RR
2012 - 1st, European Superstock 600 Championship, Honda CBR600RR

=== Grand Prix motorcycle racing ===
==== By season ====
Season	Class	Motorcycle	Team	Race	Win	Podium	Pole	FLap	Pts	Plcd
2008	125cc	Honda	Dutch Racing Team	1	0	0	0	0	0	NC
2009	125cc	Honda	Dutch Racing Team	1	0	0	0	0	0	NC
2010	125cc	Aprilia	Team Sachsenring	6	0	0	0	0	0	NC
2010	125cc	Lambretta	Lambretta Reparto Corse	1	0	0	0	0	0	NC
2011	Moto2	Ten Kate	EAB Racing	1	0	0	0	0	0	NC
2017	MotoGP	Yamaha	Monster Yamaha Tech 3	2	0	0	0	0	0	28th
Total				**12**	**0**	**0**	**0**	**0**	**0**	

==== Races by year ====
(key) (Races in bold indicate pole position; races in italics indicate fastest lap)

Year	Class	Bike	1	2	3	4	5	6	7	8	9	10	11	12	13	14	15	16	17	18	Pos	Pts
2008	125cc	Honda	QAT	SPA	POR	CHN	FRA	ITA	CAT	GBR	NED; 26	GER	CZE	RSM	IND	JPN	AUS	MAL	VAL		NC	0
2009	125cc	Honda	QAT	JPN	SPA	FRA	ITA	CAT	NED; 18	GER	GBR	CZE	IND	RSM	POR	AUS	MAL	VAL			NC	0
2010	125cc	Aprilia	QAT	SPA; Ret																	NC	0
2010	125cc	Lambretta			FRA; 22	ITA; 22	GBR; 22	NED; 21	CAT; 20	GER; Ret	CZE	IND	RSM	ARA	JPN	MAL	AUS	POR	VAL		NC	0
2011	Moto2	Ten Kate	QAT	SPA	POR	FRA	CAT	GBR	NED; 22	ITA	GER	CZE	IND	RSM	ARA	JPN	AUS	MAL	VAL		NC	0
2017	MotoGP	Yamaha	QAT	ARG	AME	SPA	FRA	ITA	CAT	NED	GER	CZE	AUT	GBR	RSM	ARA	JPN	AUS	MAL; 16	VAL; 17	28th	0

=== European Superstock 600 ===
==== Races by year ====
(key) (Races in bold indicate pole position, races in italics indicate fastest lap)

Year	Bike	1	2	3	4	5	6	7	8	9	10	Pos	Pts
2010	Honda	POR	VAL	NED	ITA	MIS	CZE	GBR	GER	IMO	FRA; 7	30th	9
2011	Honda	NED; 1	ITA; 10	MIS; Ret	SPA; 6	CZE; 6	GBR; Ret	GER; 1	IMO; 5	FRA; 1	POR; 1	3rd	137
2012	Honda	IMO; 3	NED; 1	ITA; 4	MIS; 1	SPA; 2	CZE; 1	GBR; 2	GER; 1	POR; 1	FRA; 1	1st	219

=== Supersport World Championship ===
==== Races by year ====
(key) (Races in bold indicate pole position; races in italics indicate fastest lap)

Year	Bike	1	2	3	4	5	6	7	8	9	10	11	12	13	Pos	Pts
2012	Honda	AUS	ITA	NED	ITA	EUR	SMR	SPA	CZE	GBR	RUS; DNS	GER	POR	FRA	NC	0
2013	Honda	AUS; 3	SPA; 2	NED; 4	ITA; DNS	GBR; 20	POR; 4	ITA; 5	RUS; C	GBR; 9	GER; 5	TUR; 3	FRA; 6	SPA; 4	4th	130
2014	Honda	AUS; Ret	SPA; 2	NED; 1	ITA; 2	**GBR**; 1	MAL; 1	ITA; 2	POR; 1	**SPA**; 1	FRA; 2	QAT; 1			1st	230

=== Superbike World Championship ===
==== Races by year ====
(key) (Races in bold indicate pole position; races in italics indicate fastest lap)

Year	Bike	1		2		3		4		5		6		7		8		9		10		11		12		13		Pos	Pts
Year	Bike	R1	R2	R1	R2	R1	R2	R1	R2	R1	R2	R1	R2	R1	R2	R1	R2	R1	R2	R1	R2	R1	R2	R1	R2	R1	R2	Pos	Pts
2015	Honda	AUS; 5	AUS; Ret	THA; Ret	THA; 7	SPA; Ret	SPA; 8	NED; 3	NED; 3	ITA; 9	ITA; Ret	GBR; DSQ	GBR; Ret	POR; 9	POR; 5	ITA; 10	ITA; 10	USA; 8	USA; 7	MAL; Ret	MAL; 5	SPA; 3	SPA; 13	FRA; 4	FRA; 4	QAT; 5	QAT; 4	7th	194
2016	Honda	AUS; 3	AUS; 2	**THA**; 3	**THA**; 4	SPA; Ret	SPA; 7	NED; Ret	NED; 3	ITA; 7	ITA; 9	MAL; 7	MAL; 6	GBR; 8	GBR; 8	ITA; 3	ITA; 10	USA; 4	USA; 7	GER; 6	GER; 8	FRA; 2	FRA; 5	SPA; 5	SPA; 6	QAT; 9	QAT; 11	4th	267
2017	Yamaha	AUS; 9	AUS; 7	THA; 5	THA; Ret	SPA; 5	SPA; 5	NED; Ret	NED; 4	ITA; 7	ITA; 9	GBR; 5	GBR; 4	ITA; Ret	ITA; 4	USA; 8	USA; 10	GER; 15	GER; 11	POR; 5	POR; 2	FRA; 9	FRA; 3	SPA; 5	SPA; 6	QAT; Ret	QAT; 4	6th	223
2018	Yamaha	AUS; 9	AUS; 7	THA; 7	THA; 2	SPA; 5	SPA; 5	NED; 2	NED; 3	ITA; 6	ITA; Ret	GBR; 1	GBR; 1	CZE; 4	CZE; 2	USA; 8	USA; 5	ITA; 4	ITA; 2	POR; 3	POR; 2	FRA; 7	FRA; 3	ARG; 8	ARG; 9	QAT; 7	QAT; C	3rd	333

Year	Bike	1			2			3			4			5			6			7			8			9			10			11			12			13			Pos	Pts
Year	Bike	R1	SR	R2	R1	SR	R2	R1	SR	R2	R1	SR	R2	R1	SR	R2	R1	SR	R2	R1	SR	R2	R1	SR	R2	R1	SR	R2	R1	SR	R2	R1	SR	R2	R1	SR	R2	R1	SR	R2	Pos	Pts
2019	Yamaha	AUS; 5	AUS; 5	AUS; 4	THA; 4	THA; 4	THA; 4	SPA; 6	SPA; 15	SPA; 8	NED; 3	NED; C	NED; 2	ITA; 4	ITA; 4	ITA; C	SPA; 2	SPA; 2	SPA; 1	ITA; DNS	ITA; DNS	ITA; DNS	GBR; 8	GBR; 8	GBR; 8	USA; 7	USA; 10	USA; Ret	POR; 3	POR; 6	POR; 7	FRA; 13	FRA; 3	FRA; 2	ARG; 4	ARG; 6	ARG; 4	QAT; 6	QAT; 6	QAT; 7	4th	327
2020	Yamaha	AUS; 4	AUS; 5	AUS; 4	SPA; Ret	SPA; 3	SPA; 7	POR; 3	POR; 7	POR; 3	SPA; 5	SPA; 3	SPA; 6	SPA; 4	SPA; 10	SPA; 6	SPA; 4	SPA; 1	SPA; 2	FRA; 9	FRA; 3	FRA; 5	POR; Ret	POR; 3	POR; 4																5th	221
2021	BMW	SPA; 11	SPA; 5	SPA; 5	POR; 7	POR; 13	POR; 6	ITA; 10	ITA; Ret	ITA; 10	GBR; 5	GBR; 3	GBR; 5	NED; 4	NED; Ret	NED; 6	CZE; Ret	CZE; 11	CZE; 7	SPA; 7	SPA; 8	SPA; 9	FRA; 5	FRA; 6	FRA; 8	SPA; 5	SPA; Ret	SPA; 9	SPA; 7	SPA; C	SPA; 8	POR; Ret	POR; 1	POR; 6	ARG; 6	ARG; 5	ARG; 6	INA; 6	INA; C	INA; 3	6th	262
2022	BMW	SPA	SPA	SPA	NED; 13	NED; 10	NED; 8	POR; WD	POR; WD	POR; WD	ITA	ITA	ITA	GBR	GBR	GBR	CZE	CZE	CZE	FRA; 12	FRA; 13	FRA; Ret	SPA; Ret	SPA; Ret	SPA; 13	POR; 14	POR; 8	POR; 12	ARG; 10	ARG; 11	ARG; 10	INA; Ret	INA; 10	INA; 12	AUS; Ret	AUS; 21	AUS; 12				15th	46
2023	BMW	AUS; Ret	AUS; 10	AUS; 12	INA; 6	INA; 8	INA; Ret	NED; 13	NED; 10	NED; Ret	SPA	SPA	SPA	EMI	EMI	EMI	GBR	GBR	GBR	ITA	ITA	ITA	CZE; 13	CZE; 14	CZE; 15	FRA; 16	FRA; 13	FRA; Ret	SPA; 13	SPA; 13	SPA; 11	POR; 7	POR; 7	POR; 11	SPA; Ret	SPA; 8	SPA; 12				17th	54
2024	BMW	AUS; 7	AUS; 16	AUS; 8	SPA; 9	SPA; 6	SPA; 4	NED; 7	NED; 8	NED; 9	ITA; 8	ITA; 12	ITA; Ret	GBR; 9	GBR; 12	GBR; 12	CZE; 9	CZE; 9	CZE; 5	POR; 6	POR; 4	POR; 7	FRA; 1	FRA; 8	FRA; 5	ITA; 7	ITA; 12	ITA; 7	SPA; 9	SPA; 8	SPA; 7	POR; 7	POR; 12	POR; 5	SPA; 6	SPA; 6	SPA; 3				6th	245
2025	BMW	AUS; Ret	AUS; 14	AUS; 14	POR; 6	POR; 7	POR; 5	NED; 9	NED; 5	NED; 17	ITA; 8	ITA; 9	ITA; 9	CZE; Ret	CZE; 13	CZE; 14	EMI; Ret	EMI; 12	EMI; 10	GBR; 13	GBR; Ret	GBR; Ret	HUN; 11	HUN; 15	HUN; 16	FRA; Ret	FRA; 5	FRA; 5	ARA; 10	ARA; 9	ARA; Ret	POR; 15	POR; 9	POR; 10	SPA; 10	SPA; 9	SPA; 13				12th	111
2026	BMW	AUS	AUS	AUS	POR	POR	POR	NED	NED	NED	HUN	HUN	HUN	CZE; 14	CZE; 10	CZE; 13	ARA; 11	ARA; 11	ARA; Ret	EMI; 11	EMI; 9	EMI; 10	GBR	GBR	GBR	FRA	FRA	FRA	ITA	ITA	ITA	POR	POR	POR	SPA	SPA	SPA				20th	23

=== Suzuka 8 Hours results ===
Year	Team	Co-riders	Bike	Pos
2013	(Japan) MuSASHi RT HARC-PRO.	(United Kingdom) Leon Haslam (Japan) Takumi Takahashi	Honda CBR1000RR	1st
2014	(Japan) MuSASHi RT HARC-PRO.	(United Kingdom) Leon Haslam (Japan) Takumi Takahashi	Honda CBR1000RR	1st
2015	(Japan) MuSASHi RT HARC-PRO.	(Australia) Casey Stoner (Japan) Takumi Takahashi	Honda CBR1000RR	Ret
2016	(Japan) MuSASHi RT HARC-PRO.	(United States) Nicky Hayden (Japan) Takumi Takahashi	Honda CBR1000RR	Ret
2017	(Japan) Yamaha Factory Racing Team	(United Kingdom) Alex Lowes (Japan) Katsuyuki Nakasuga	Yamaha YZF-R1	1st
2018	(Japan) Yamaha Factory Racing Team	(United Kingdom) Alex Lowes (Japan) Katsuyuki Nakasuga	Yamaha YZF-R1	1st
2019	(Japan) Yamaha Factory Racing Team	(United Kingdom) Alex Lowes (Japan) Katsuyuki Nakasuga	Yamaha YZF-R1	2nd
2025	(Germany) BMW Motorrad World Endurance Team	(Germany) Markus Reiterberger (South Africa) Steven Odendaal	BMW M1000RR	5th
2026	(Germany) BMW Motorrad World Endurance Team	(Germany) Markus Reiterberger (South Africa) Steven Odendaal	BMW M1000RR	TBD
