= List of fastest production motorcycles =

The fastest production motorcycle for a given year is the unmodified motorcycle with the highest tested top speed that was manufactured in series and available for purchase by the general public. Modified or specially produced motorcycles are a different class, motorcycle land-speed record. Unlike those records, which are officially sanctioned by the Fédération Internationale de Motocyclisme (FIM), production model tests were conducted under a variety of unequal or undefined conditions, and tested by numerous different sources, mainly motorcycling magazines. This has led to inconsistent and sometimes contradictory speed statistics from various sources.

== Fastest production motorcycles ==
Several models went out of production before being surpassed by a contemporary with a higher top speed. Until a model was introduced that was faster than any previous motorcycle, the fastest bike on the market for a given year was actually slower than an earlier, out of production bike. Models which are actual top speed record holders have their make, model, and speed in bold font, while slower models which were the fastest only in their own time are in italic. For example, in 1956, the Vincent Black Shadow remained the fastest motorcycle to date, with a 125 mph (201 km/h) top speed, but it was no longer in production. The fastest model on the market in 1956 was the BSA Gold Star Clubman, which at 110 mph (180 km/h) was not a record holder, but is listed for the sake of illustrating a more complete timeline.

Make & model	Model years	Engine	Displacement	Power	Top speed	Image	Notes
BMW S 1000 RR (second generation)	2019–present	Inline four	999 cc (61.0 cu in)	205 hp (153 kW)	193 mph (310 km/h)		By some measures, faster than MV Agusta F4 R 312.
BMW S 1000 RR (first generation)	2009–2018	Inline four	999 cc (61.0 cu in)	199 bhp (148 kW)	188 mph (303 km/h)		By some measures, faster than MV Agusta F4 R 312. BMW considered to have initiated the "gentlemen's agreement"; first party to agreement to exceed self-imposed limit.
MV Agusta F4 R 312	2007–08	Inline four	998 cc (60.9 cu in)	183 bhp (136 kW)	185–193 mph (298–311 km/h)		First European motorcycle exceeding "gentlemen's agreement"; MV Agusta not known to have been a party.
Kawasaki ZX-14	2006–	Inline four	1,352 cc (82.5 cu in)	163.3 hp (121.8 kW)^{†}	186 mph (300 km/h)		Speed limited
Kawasaki ZX-12R	2000–05	Inline four	1,199 cc (73.2 cu in)	178 bhp (133 kW)	186 mph (300 km/h)		Speed limited
Suzuki Hayabusa (first generation)	2000–2007	Inline four	1,299 cc (79.3 cu in)	173 bhp (129 kW)	186 mph (300 km/h)		Speed limited
**Suzuki Hayabusa (first generation)**	1999	Inline four	1,299 cc (79.3 cu in)	173 bhp (129 kW)	**188–194 mph (303–312 km/h)**		Last model before gentlemen's agreement.
**Honda CBR1100XX Super Blackbird**	1996–2007	Inline four	1,137 cc (69.4 cu in)	162 bhp (121 kW)	**170–180 mph (270–290 km/h)**		
Bimota YB8 Furano	1992–1993	Inline four	1,002 cc (61.1 cu in)	164 hp (122 kW)	172 mph (277 km/h)		By some measures, faster than Kawasaki Ninja ZX-11.
**Kawasaki Ninja ZX-11**	1990–2001	Inline four	1,052 cc (64.2 cu in)	145 bhp (108 kW)	**169–176 mph (272–283 km/h)**		
**Bimota YB6 EXUP**	1989–1990	Inline four	1,002 cc (61.1 cu in)	147 bhp (110 kW)	**170 mph (270 km/h)**		
**Yamaha FZR1000 "EXUP"**	1989–1995	Inline four	1,003 cc (61.2 cu in)	145 hp (108 kW)	**167 mph (269 km/h)**		
**Kawasaki Tomcat ZX-10**	1988–1990	Inline four	997 cc (60.8 cu in)	135 hp (101 kW)	**165 mph (266 km/h)**		
Yamaha FZR1000 "Genesis"	1987–1988	Inline four	989 cc (60.4 cu in)	135 hp (101 kW)	158.4–160 mph (254.9–257.5 km/h)		By some measures, faster than Honda CBR1000F.
**Honda CBR1000F**	1987–1999	Inline four	998 cc (60.9 cu in)	132 hp (98 kW)	**154–164 mph (248–264 km/h)**		
**Suzuki GSX-R 1100 (G-H-J)**	1986–1988	Inline four	1,052 cc (64.2 cu in)	125 hp (93 kW)	**160 mph (257 km/h)**		
**Kawasaki GPZ900R Ninja**	1984–1996	Inline four	908 cc (55.4 cu in)	113–115 bhp (84–86 kW)	**151–158 mph (243–254 km/h)**		
Honda VF1000R	1984–1988	V-four	998 cc (60.9 cu in)	122 bhp (91 kW)	150 mph (240 km/h)		First to exceed Vincent Black Lightning after 35 years
Laverda Jota	1976–1981	Inline three	981 cc (59.9 cu in)	90 bhp (67 kW)	140–146 mph (225–235 km/h)		
Ducati 900SS	1975–1982	V-twin	864 cc (52.7 cu in)	79 bhp (59 kW)	135 mph (217 km/h)		
Kawasaki Z1	1972–1975	Inline four	903 cc (55.1 cu in)	82 bhp (61 kW)	132 mph (212 km/h)		
BSA Rocket 3/Triumph Trident	1968–1975	Inline three	740 cc (45 cu in)	58 bhp (43 kW)	125 mph (201 km/h)^{*}		
Harley-Davidson XLCH Sportster	1958–1971	V-twin	883 cc (53.9 cu in)	55 bhp (41 kW)	122 mph (196 km/h)		
BSA Gold Star Clubman	1956–1963	Single	499 cc (30.5 cu in)	42 bhp (31 kW)	110 mph (180 km/h)		
**Vincent Black Lightning**	1949–1952	V-twin	998 cc (60.9 cu in)	70 bhp (52 kW)	**150 mph (240 km/h)**		First to exceed Brough Superior SS100 Pendine after 22 years. Record held for 35 years.
Vincent Series A Rapide	1936–1940	V-twin	998 cc (60.9 cu in)	45 bhp (34 kW)	110 mph (180 km/h)		
Crocker V-twin	1936–ca. 1941	V-twin	998 cc (60.9 cu in)	50 bhp (37 kW)	110 mph (180 km/h)		
Brough Superior SS100 Alpine Grand Sports	1934–1940	V-twin	996 cc (60.8 cu in)	75 bhp (56 kW)	110 mph (180 km/h)		
**Brough Superior SS100 Pendine**	1927–1940	V-twin	981 cc (59.9 cu in)	45 bhp (34 kW)	**110 mph (180 km/h)**		Record held for 22 years
**Brough Superior SS100**	1925–1940	V-twin	988 cc (60.3 cu in)	45 bhp (34 kW)	**100 mph (160 km/h)**		
Excelsior V-twin	1918–1931	V-twin	992 cc (60.5 cu in)	20 bhp (15 kW)	80 mph (130 km/h)		
**Cyclone V-twin**	1916–1917	V-twin	996 cc (60.8 cu in)	25 bhp (19 kW)	**85 mph (137 km/h)**		
**Pope Model L**	1914–1920	V-twin	999 cc (61.0 cu in)	12 bhp (8.9 kW)	**70 mph (110 km/h)**		
**Williamson Flat Twin**	1913–1920	Flat twin	964 cc (58.8 cu in)		**55 mph (89 km/h)**		
**Scott two speed**	1912–	Parallel twin	532 cc (32.5 cu in)	3 bhp (2.2 kW)	**50 mph (80 km/h)**		
**FN Four**	1911–1931	Inline four	491 cc (30.0 cu in)	4 bhp (3.0 kW)	**40 mph (64 km/h)**		
**Werner** **New Werner**	1901–1908	Single	230–333 cc (14.0–20.3 cu in)	2–3.25 bhp (1.49–2.42 kW)	**30 mph (48 km/h)**		
Werner Motocyclette	1898–1900	Single	216 cc (13.2 cu in)		15.5–22 mph (25–35 km/h)		
**Hildebrand & Wolfmüller**	1894–1897	Parallel twin	1,500 cc (92 cu in)	2.5 hp (1.9 kW)	**25–28 mph (40–45 km/h)**		First production motorcycle.

*Other models that tied the Trident at 125 mph (201 km/h) are the 1972 Laverda SFC and Moto Guzzi V7 Sport.
†Rear wheel horsepower. See Motorcycle testing and measurement.

== Motorcycles not meeting all criteria ==
These motorcycles are mentioned here because they meet some of this list's criteria, and are often discussed in media in the same context as production, street-legal motorcycles, but they do not strictly meet all of the criteria, being limited production or made to order, or not generally available for immediate sale to the public, or are track-only and not generally street legal in Europe, Asia, and North America.

Make & model	Model years	Engine	Displacement	Power	Top speed	Image	Notes
Lightning LS-218	2014–present	Electric motor	N/A	200 bhp (150 kW)	216 mph (348 km/h)		The 216 mph record was set using an LS-218 modified from street-legal form, with "high-speed gearing and fairing". The top speed of the stock production vehicle has not been clearly defined by an independent, verifiable source. Otherwise, first electric vehicle to be considered for the position of the world's fastest street-legal production motorcycle, to have won against ICE motorcycles in a professional road-based event and to have won any such race using only solar power.
Kawasaki Ninja H2R	2015–present	Inline 4	998 cc (60.9 cu in)	310 / 326 hp (231 / 243 kW) (without/with ram air)	Over 215 mph (346 km/h) (stock, standing mile)		Excluded as the record-beating H2R variant is track-only and not street-legal.
Ducati Panigale R	2013-2017	V-twin	1,198 cc (73.1 cu in)	202 bhp (151 kW)	202 mph (325 km/h)		Top speed achieved with OEM track-only exhaust system.

== Gentlemen's agreement to end competition ==
After just over a century of one-upmanship by motorcycle manufacturers, beginning with the 1894–1897 Hildebrand & Wolfmüller, the competition to create the fastest production motorcycle reached a truce, with the arrival of the 1999 Suzuki Hayabusa, that lasted about 8 years. A gentlemen's agreement was made among the major motorcycle manufacturers to limit the speed of their machines to 300 km/h (186 mph), starting with 2000 models.

After the 1999 Hayabusa sent shockwaves by exceeding the Honda CBR1100XX's record by more than 10 mph (16 km/h), and rumors and leaks from Kawasaki hinted that their upcoming 2000 Ninja ZX-12R would pass the 200 mph (322 km/h) milestone, some regulators and politicians in Europe called for an import ban against high speed motorcycles. There were fears that there would be "an outbreak of illegal racing as riders try to break the 200 mph barrier". To preempt regulation and avoid negative publicity, the manufacturers voluntarily ended the race to ever higher speeds.

Sources vary as to whether this unofficial agreement is precise or only approximate, and whether it is defined as 300 km/h or as 186 mph, though the European and Japanese manufacturers normally use metric units. While Honda did announce that its motorcycles would not go faster than 300 km/h, Suzuki and Kawasaki would not speak on record about this issue. The agreement between them and the other brands has never been officially acknowledged by the manufacturers, though media sources report it via unnamed informants, and by testing the top speed of motorcycles known to be capable of exceeding the arbitrary maximum. So for 2000 models and later motorcycles, the question of which brand's bike was fastest could only be answered by tampering with the speed limiting system, meaning that it was no longer a contest between stock, production motorcycles, absolving the manufacturer of blame and letting those not quite as fast avoid losing face. But the speed war continued underground, out of the spotlight, with fierce competition among enthusiasts of the "200 mph club", albeit with the slight technical modification necessary to bypass the speed limiter, separating that war from the ostensibly at-peace world of stock motorcycles.

=== Breakaways from the agreement ===
MV Agusta advertised their 2007 F4 R 312 as capable of 312 km/h (194 mph), hence the "312" in the name, "because MV sees no reason to abide by the manufacturers' agreement ... Politics be damned: MV is Italian and the Italians have a national imperative to make their bikes as fast as possible," in the opinion of motoring journalist Roland Brown. Italian magazine Motociclismo claimed to have achieved 193.24 mph (310.99 km/h) testing the F4 R 312, more or less confirming the claimed speed and tying, if not exceeding, the 1999 Suzuki Hayabusa's tested speeds of 188–194 mph (303–312 km/h), whereas Sport Rider were only able to achieve a 185.4 mph (298.4 km/h) top speed, stating that "it would take a major horsepower boost in order to make up the 8 mph deficit".

Cycle World reported that "the same BMW who instigated the 'agreement' in the first place" had broken it with the 188-mile-per-hour (303 km/h) BMW S1000RR, whose top speed was reported in July, 2010.

The 2013 Ducati 1199 Panigale R was delivered with an electronic speedometer that blanked when the motorcycle exceeded 186 mph (300 km/h), leading commentators to question if Ducati was signaling their withdrawal from the gentlemen's agreement.

In 2014, Kawasaki announced that the upcoming Ninja H2 will have a non-street legal "track-only" version (Ninja H2R) making 296 hp (221 kW) that will not have a speed limiter, reaching 210 mph (340 km/h) in testing, but Kawasaki did not specify whether they planned to speed limit the street-legal version, which has about 200 hp (150 kW), to conform to the gentlemen's agreement.

== See also ==
- Motorcycle testing and measurement
- Motorcycle land-speed record
- List of fastest production motorcycles by acceleration
