= Pope Model L =

American motorcycle model

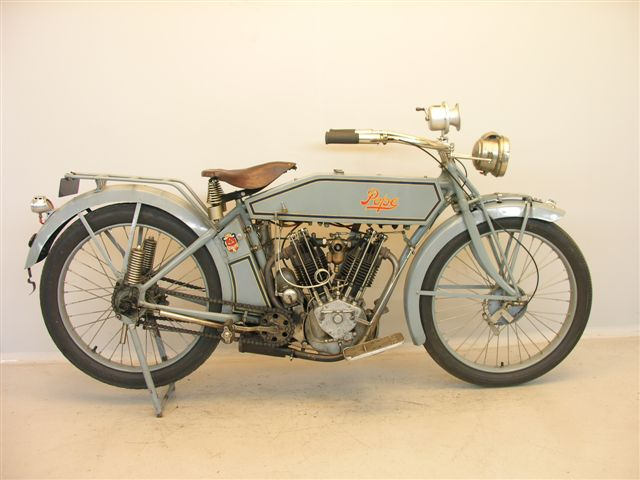
- Manufacturer: Pope Manufacturing Company
- Production: 1914–1920
- Engine: 61 cu in (1,000 cm^{3}) OHV carbureted V-twin; Iron cylinders, aluminum crankcase
- Bore / stroke: 3.328125 in × 3.5 in (84.5344 mm × 88.9000 mm)
- Power: 15.4 hp (11.5 kW)
- Ignition type: Bosch magneto
- Transmission: Three speed, chain drive Eclipse multiple-disk clutch; lever on left side of chassis
- Suspension: Front: Leaf spring Rear:Twin coil springs
- Brakes: V-band brake actuated by backpedaling
- Tires: 28 in × 3 in (711 mm × 76 mm) clinchers
- Wheelbase: 56.25 in (1,429 mm)

The Pope Model L was a motorcycle produced by Pope Manufacturing Company in Westfield, Massachusetts, between 1914 and 1920.

The Model L was, at 70 miles per hour (110 km/h), the fastest motorcycle in the world when introduced.

It was technologically advanced for its time, with features not found on other motorcycles, such as overhead valves, chain drive (from 1918) and multi-speed transmission. It was also expensive at $250, as much then as a Model T automobile. (Another source of competition were cyclecars)

== Specifications ==
Specifications in infobox to the right are from the Smithsonian Institution.

== Postage stamp ==
A five cent United States postage stamp was issued in October, 1983, with an engraved image of the Pope Model L.

== See also ==
- List of motorcycles of the 1910s
- FN Four
- Sears Dreadnought
- Thor Model U
- List of fastest production motorcycles

Records
Preceded by Williamson Flat Twin	Fastest production motorcycle 1914–1916	Succeeded by Cyclone V-twin
