= Williamson Flat Twin =

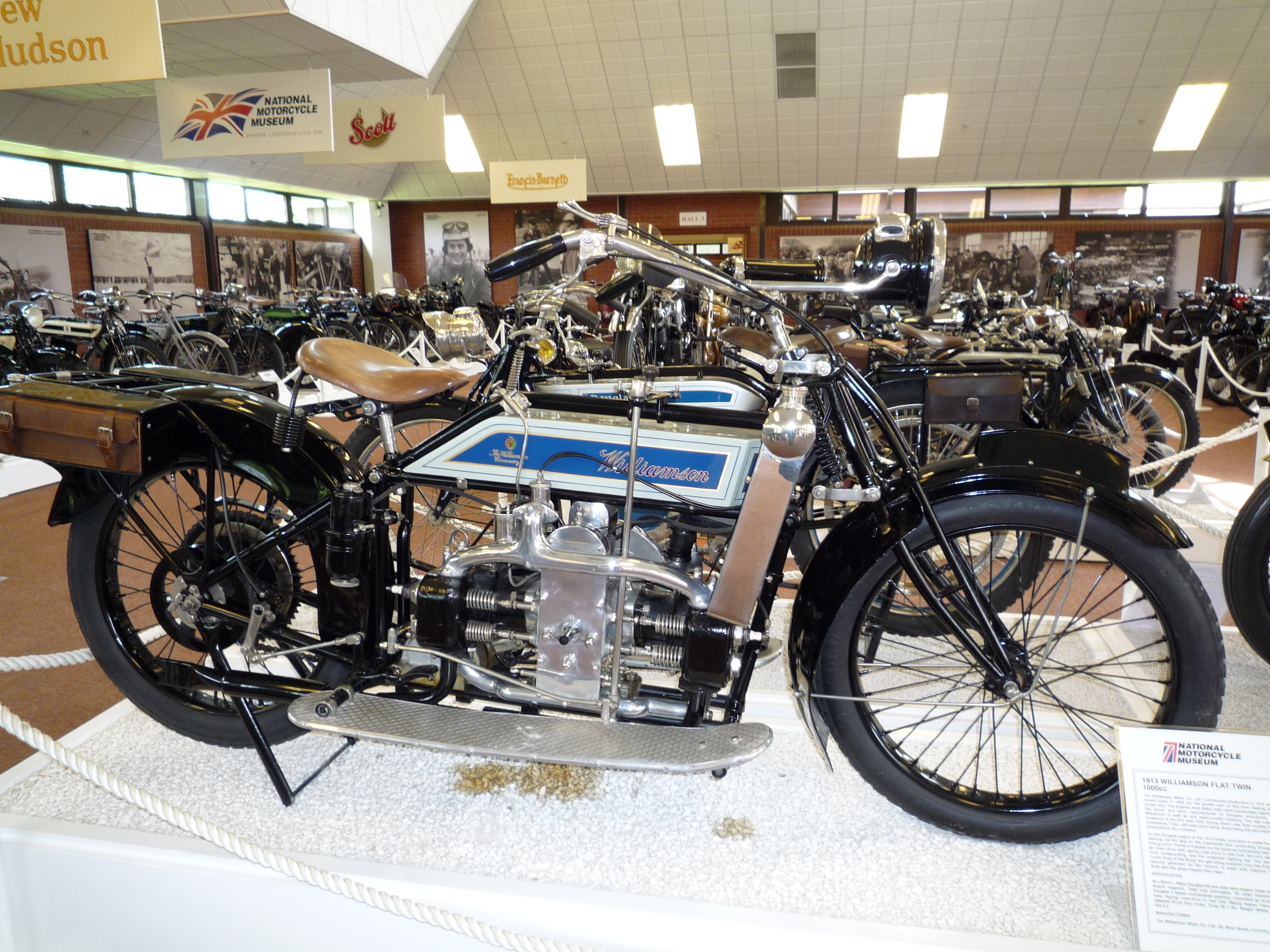
- Manufacturer: Williamson Motor Company
- Production: 1912-1920
- Engine: 964cc water-cooled twin
- Wheelbase: 60.5 inches (154 cm)
- Weight: 300 pounds (140 kg) (dry)

The Williamson Flat Twin was motorcycle made in Coventry, UK by William ('Billy') Williamson, who had been managing director of the Coventry-based Rex company. He teamed up with William Douglas (of Douglas Motorcycles to develop new prototype motorcycles under the name Williamson-Douglas and employed Billy's brother Harold as a test rider. Douglas had been developing a 964 cc water-cooled flat twin engine that could be used either for light cars or motorcycles. Billy Williamson fitted this engine into a frame with Douglas-Druid girder forks and a Douglas two-speed gearbox and a foot-operated clutch which was launched in 1912 at a cost of £82. In 1913 an air-cooled version was added to the range and in 1914 a kick starter was added. Production was halted by World War I and in 1919 the only engines available were JAP 980 cc air-cooled side valves, so Williamson redesigned the frame to fit. Unfortunately Billy Williamson suffered a fatal heart attack in 1920 after only twenty motorcycles had been produced.

== See also ==
- List of motorcycles of the 1910s
- List of motorcycles by type of engine
- List of fastest production motorcycles

Records
Preceded by Scott two speed	Fastest production motorcycle 1913–1914	Succeeded by Pope Model L
