= MV Agusta F4 series =

Four-cylinder sport bike

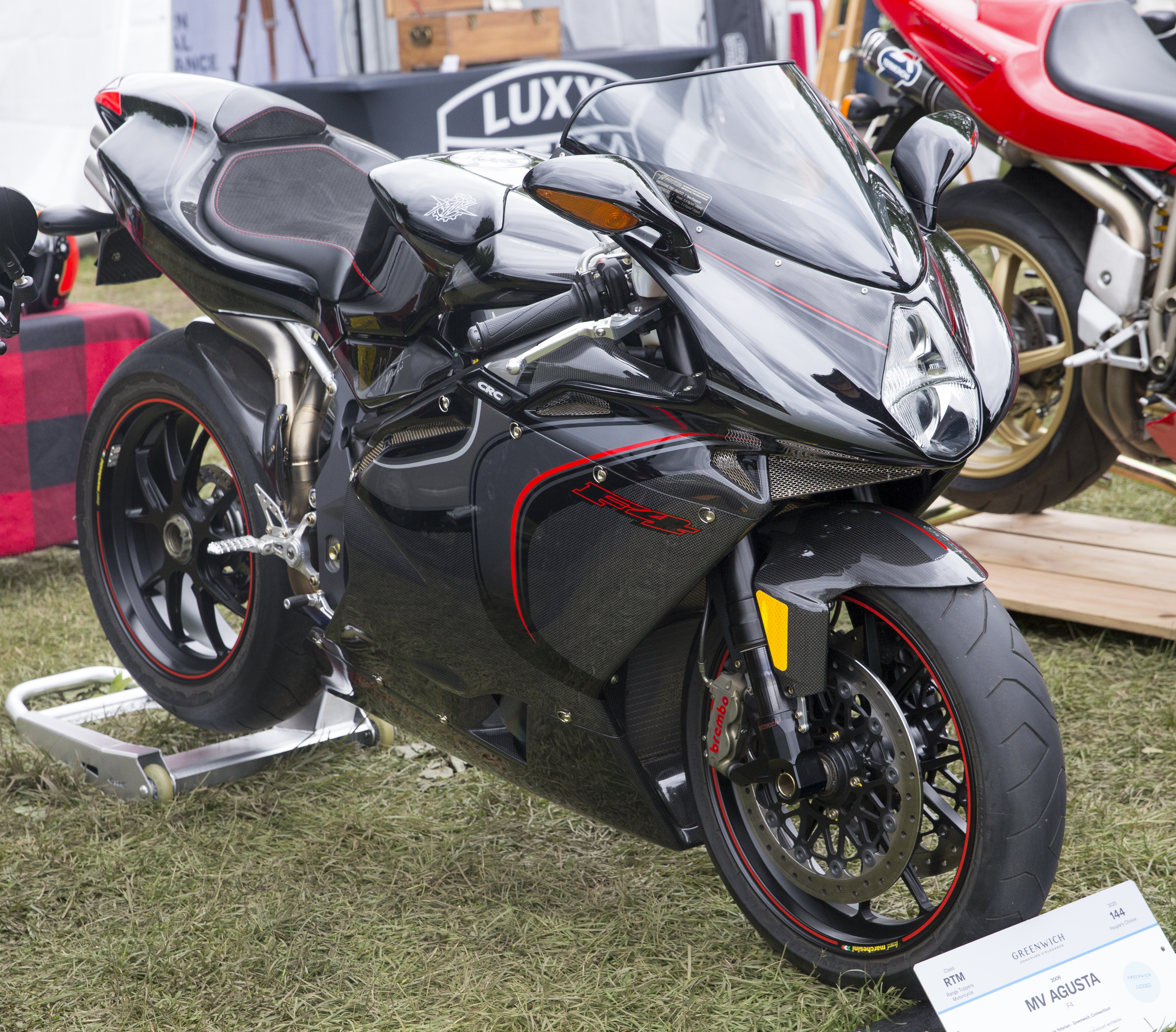
- 2006 MV Agusta F4 CC
- Manufacturer: MV Agusta
- Production: 1999–2018
- Class: Sport bike
- Engine: Four cylinder, 4 stroke 749.5 cc (46 cu in); 998 cc (61 cu in); 1,078 cc (66 cu in)
- Bore / stroke: 73.8 mm × 43.8 mm (2.91 in × 1.72 in); 76 mm × 55 mm (3.0 in × 2.2 in); 79 mm × 50.9 mm (3.11 in × 2.00 in); 79 mm × 55 mm (3.1 in × 2.2 in)
- Power: 137–190 hp (102–142 kW)
- Related: MV Agusta Brutale

The MV Agusta F4 is an inline four-cylinder sport bike made by MV Agusta from 1999 until 2018. It was the motorcycle that launched the resurrection of the brand in 1998. The F4 was created by motorcycle designer Massimo Tamburini at CRC (Cagiva Research Center), following his work on the Ducati 916. The F4 has a single-sided swingarm, large diameter (49 or 50 mm (1.9 or 2.0 in)) front forks and traditional MV Agusta red and silver livery. The F4 engine is also one of the few production superbikes to have a hemi-spherical cylinder head chamber design with 4 valves per cylinder.

== Engine ==
The F4 engine is a liquid cooled inline four cylinder four-stroke set across the frame with two overhead camshafts (DOHC), 16 'radial' valves, electronic multipoint fuel injection, and induction discharge electronic ignition having engine displacements of 749.5 cc (45.74 cu in), 998 cc (60.9 cu in), and 1,078 cc (65.8 cu in). The engine was derived from the 1990–1992 Ferrari Formula One engine. Early in the design process Ferrari engineers assisted in the development of the engine. MV (Cagiva at the time) quickly deviated from the Ferrari design, but they kept one important feature, the radial valves. The F4 engine is unique in the sense that it is the only recently produced radial-valved multicylinder motorcycle engine.

=== Torque Shift System ===
The F4 Tamburini, F4 Veltro, and F4 CC models are equipped with variable length intake ducts known as the "TSS" system. The "TSS" system is designed to increase torque in the low to midrange, while still allowing for maximum horsepower at the top of the rev range (usually two mutually exclusive properties of an engine). The "TSS" system has two positions, it is not able to vary the height of the intake ducts continuously. "TSS" is able to lower peak torque from the 10000 rpm to 9000 rpm while maintaining maximum power. This system debuted on the F4 Tamburini and was lauded by independent motorcycling publications such as Australian Motorcycle News.

== F4 750 ==
The 750 cc F4 went into production 1999 and continued, through various models, until 2004 when it was discontinued in favour of the newly introduced 1,000 cc models.

=== F4 750 Serie Oro ===
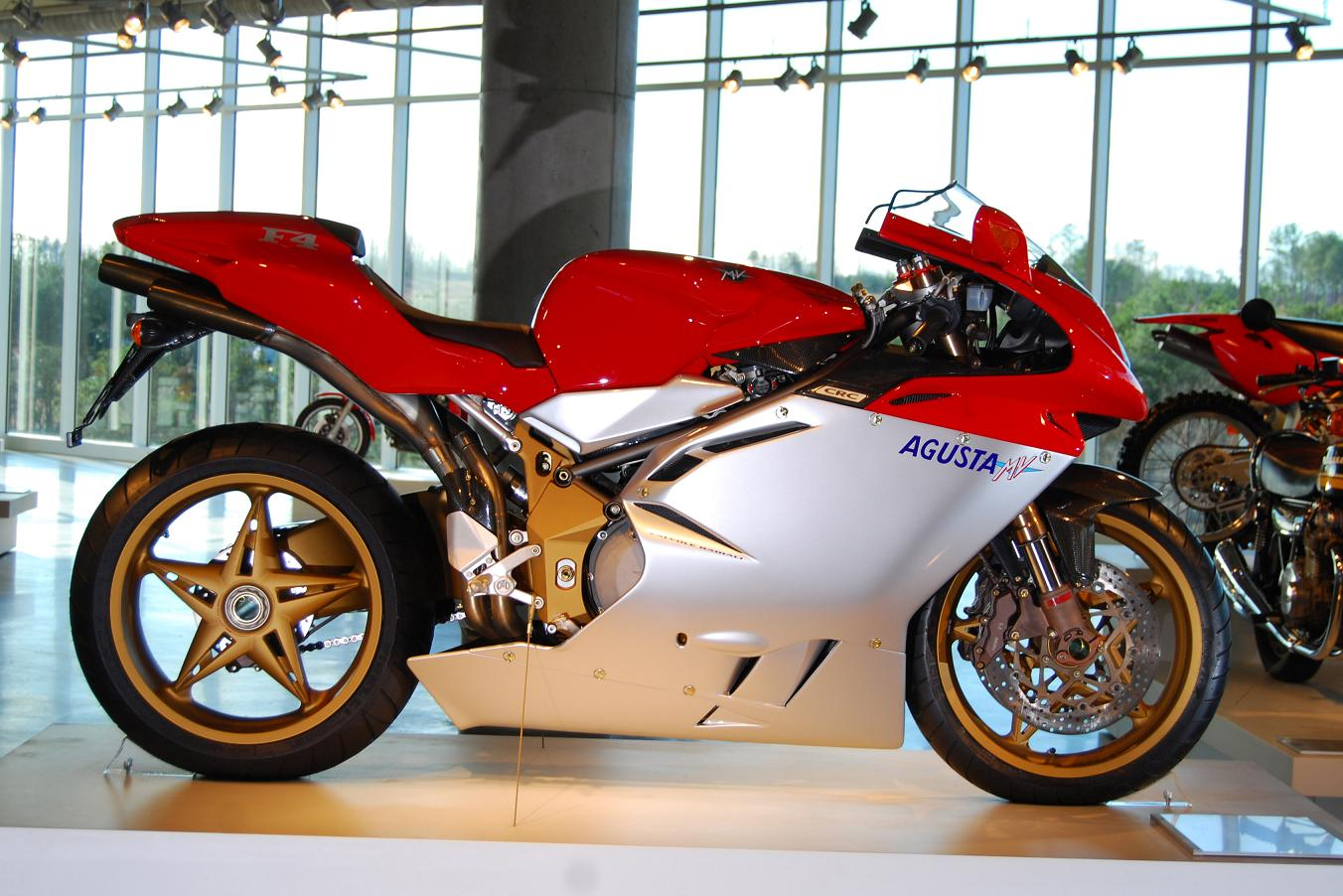
F4 750 Serie Oro

The first model of the rebirth of MV Agusta was the F4 750 Serie Oro, first revealed at the 1997 Milan EICMA Motorcycle show. The first production models were released to the public in May 1999. Production was limited to 300 examples, all of which were pre-sold. Many parts such as the swinging arm, frame side plates and wheels were made from magnesium. These magnesium parts were anodized gold for consistency with the name 'Oro' (Italian for gold). All painted parts, such as fairings, seat cover, front mudguard, fuel tank and air box are made of carbon fibre. Using these materials the weight was kept under 181 kg (399 lb) (later beaten by the F4 Veltro). The Showa fork specially made for MV Agusta has fast-detach axle clamps. The six piston (front) and 4 piston (rear) brake calipers are made by Nissin. The exclusive model came with a Certificate of Authenticity and a 24-carat gold badge with the serial number on. Amongst the original owners were MV World Champion Giacomo Agostini and King Juan Carlos of Spain.

=== F4 750 S ===
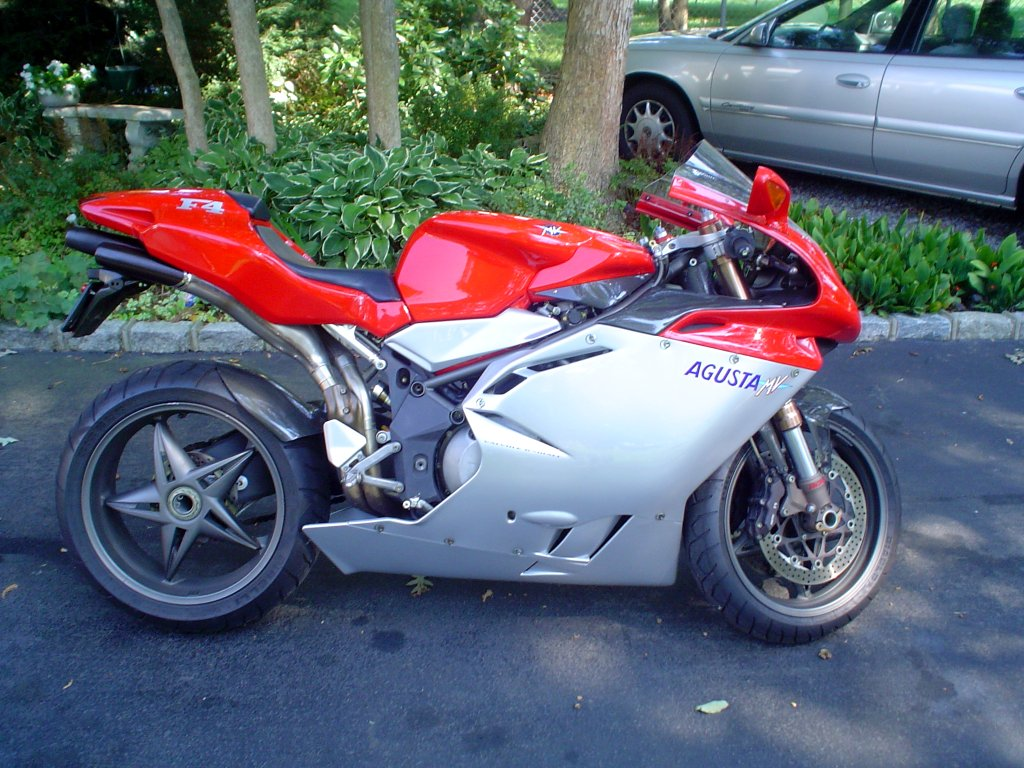
1999 MV Agusta F4 750 S

The mass production model, the F4 750 S (for Strada), released in October 1999. It was essentially the same bike as the F4 750 Oro but with aluminium components in place of magnesium and ABS parts instead of carbon fibre. These changes add approximately 20 pounds to the weight of the bike. The bike has a trellis frame made of steel tubing and aluminium castings. Front forks are upside-down 49 mm from Showa, and a fully adjustable Sachs shock absorber controls the single-sided swinging arm.

Sharing the same engine as the Oro, the engine produced 126 hp (94 kW) at 12,500 rpm. This, combined with a wet weight of 480 pounds (220 kg), gave the bike a 162 mph (261 km/h) top speed and a standing quarter-mile of 11.09 sec at 128 mph.

The F4 750 was a single-seater (monoposto) and in 2000, the F4 750 S 1+1 (Biposto) model was introduced, which has provisions for a pillion passenger.

=== F4 750 S Neiman Marcus Edition ===
The F4 750 S Neiman Marcus Edition produced for American luxury department stores chain Neiman Marcus. It was only available only from the Neiman Marcus 2000 Christmas catalog silver book ("gifts for guys"). Virtually identical to the F4 750 S except for a special brass plate with the Neiman Marcus logo stamped on the triple clamp. There were only 10 available through the Christmas Book and with each purchase, Neiman Marcus included VIP tickets to the International Superbike Classic at Laguna Seca Raceway followed by one day of California Superbike School conducted by Keith Code.

=== F4 750 S Evo 02 ===
In 2002, the F4 750 S Evo 02 model was released. This model had an upgraded engine (originally intended for a SPR version that was cancelled) with reworked combustion chamber, valves and springs. New Mahle forged pistons were used in an updated block. These modification increased power by 11 to 137 bhp (8.2 to 102.2 kW) at 10,500 rpm.

=== F4 750 Senna ===
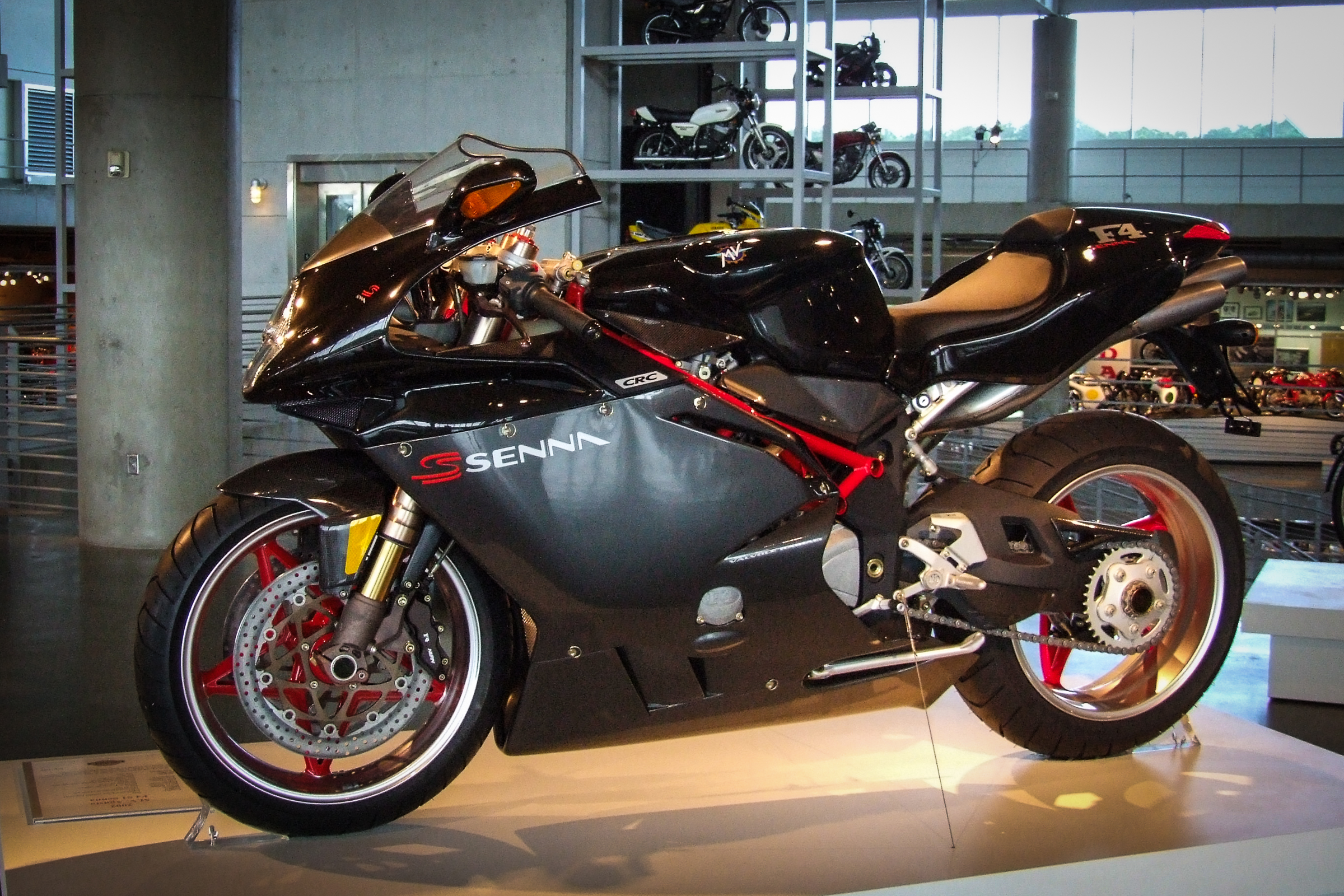
MV Agusta F4 Senna in the Barber Vintage Motorsports Museum, Birmingham, Alabama, USA

The F4 750 Senna was also released in 2002. MV CEO, Claudio Castiglioni, was a close personal friend of Ayrton Senna and introduced this special to help the Instituto Ayrton Senna, a charity founded by Senna to aid the children and young people of Brazil. Production was limited to 300 machines.

The Senna used the 136 bhp from the Evo 02 model. The cylinder heads were carefully selected to provide closer tolerances, and combined with a modified eprom, allowed the red-line to be raised to 13,900 rpm. Much of the bodywork replaced with carbon fibre items, the suspension was upgraded and distinctive wheels were fitted. The bike was finished in black with red highlighting and had a silver numbered plaque.

=== F4 750 S Evo 03 ===
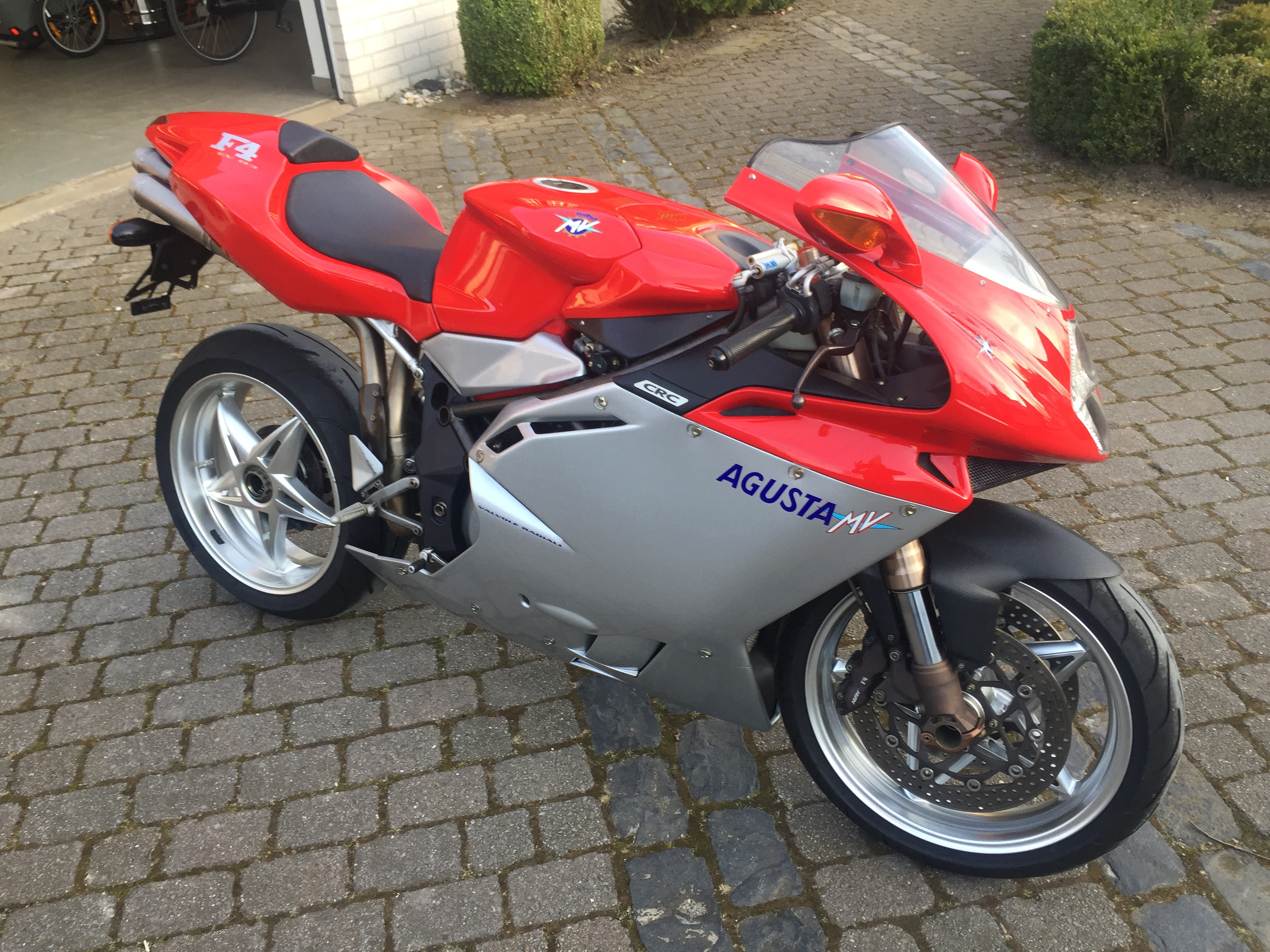
MV Agusta F4 Evo 03

In 2003, the F4 750 S Evo 03 was released, which was mostly a cosmetic upgrade.

=== F4 750 SPR ===
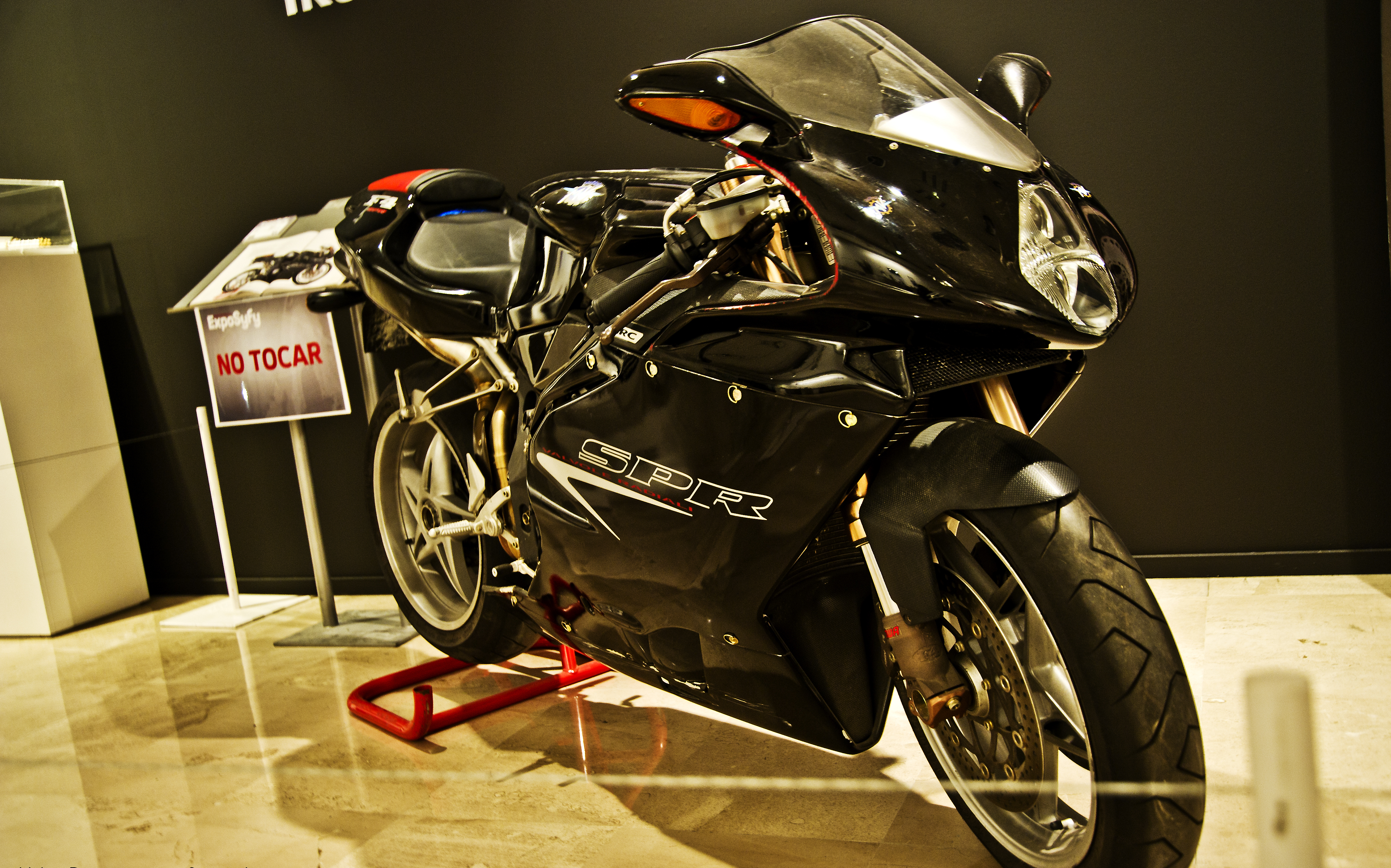
MV Agusta F4 750 SPR as used in the film I, Robot

The F4 750 SPR was released in 2003 and was intended to be the final evolution on the F4 750 platform, mainly aimed at track use. The engine was uprated from the 750 Senna with higher compression pistons, redesigned inlet and exhaust post, refrofiled combustion chamber and hand polished inlet port. Additionally, the camshaft, tappets and valve springs were also changed. These modifications allowed the SPR to produce 143 bhp (107 kW) at 13,000 rpm (146 hp; 109 kW with the optional race exhaust and chip). The clutch was uprated and a close ratio gearbox fitted.

The bike had uprated suspension, 50mm Marzocchi Titanium nitride coated forks were used at the front and a race quality Sachs shock absorber on the rear. Much of the bodywork was in carbon fibre. The bike was finished in black with polished aluminium wheels. This was a limited-edition model with only 300 units made.

=== F4 750 SR ===
A limited-edition F4 AGO had been planned based on the SPR, but a change in plan saw the AGO use the new 1,000 cc engine. To use the 750 SPR engines that were intended to go into the AGO, the SPR engines were put into 750S chassis and the model designated the F4 750 SR. Gold exhausts similar to the Serie Oro were added, and white faced instruments which displays Agostini's signature in red, as later used on the AGO model, were added. The machine was painted in the traditional MV livery of red and silver. This 2004 limited-edition model was the last F4 750 to go into production, which was limited to 300 units.

=== F4 SP-01 Viper ===
The F4 SP-01 Viper was a limited-edition upgrade kit that could be fitted to the F4 750S, produced by MV's Reparto Corse department. The kit could also be fitted to the F4 1000S. The kit consisted of carbon fibre bodywork, a titanium treated windshield, magnesium wheels, embroidered Alcantara seat and side mirrors. The kit was finished in silver and blue and came with an 18 carat gold plaque engraved with the number of the kit and a certificate of authenticity signed by designer Massimo Tamburini. The upgrade was limited to 50 units.

== F4 1000 ==
The F4 engine was originally designed to meet the then 750 cc limit of the Superbike World Championship, although an experimental 898 cc version was produced in 1998. With the sports bike market moving towards 1,000 cc machines, the motore grosso (big engine) project was revived by MV's head of engine development, Andrea Goggi, in 2001. MV had previously been approached by Steven Casaer of Maxim Experience team, to enter an MV in the FIM Endurance World Championship. An agreement was reached for the team to enter the 2001 & 2002 WEC, using the motore grosso. Various engines of 898, 952 and 998 cc were used. With the experience and development from the partnership with the Maxim Team, MV entered Andrea Mazzali in the Italian Superbike Championship on a 1,000 cc machine, which was code-named the F5, for further development and testing. (Rule changes to the Superbike Championship allowed 4 cylinder machines for 2003)

The 1,000 engine was first used in production machine in 2005 with the introduction of the F4 1000 AGO.

=== F4 1000 AGO ===
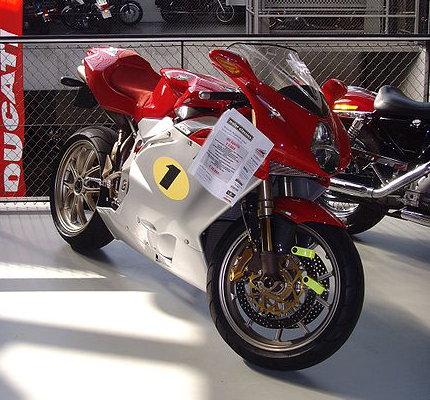
2005 MV Agusta F4 AGO

Like the F4 750 and the Oro, the new F4 1000 product line began with a special edition F4 1000 called the F4 1000 AGO in 2005. The machine was a tribute to multiple champion, Giacomo Agostini, who had won most of his championships on an MV. It premiered the new 998cc engine, which produced 166 HP (122 kW) at 11,750 rpm and had a red-line at 12,700 rpm. The frame was derived from the 750 cc item, 49 mm titanium nitride coated Showa front fork were used and a Sachs Racing shock absorber controlled the rear. Brakes were the same as used on the Oro, Nissin 6 pot calipers and discs with a gold flange. Wheels were a new design from Marchesini, forged in aluminium alloy.

Finished in classic MV Agusta red and silver, the single-seater bike came with special graphics prominently displaying the number "1" in a yellow oval in reference to MV Agusta's racing heritage and rider Agostini. The seat was finished in red Alcantara, with an F4 logo embroidered on it. The instruments had white faces with blue markings, and the rev-counter featured Agostini's signature. Production was limited to 300 bikes.

=== F4 1000 S ===
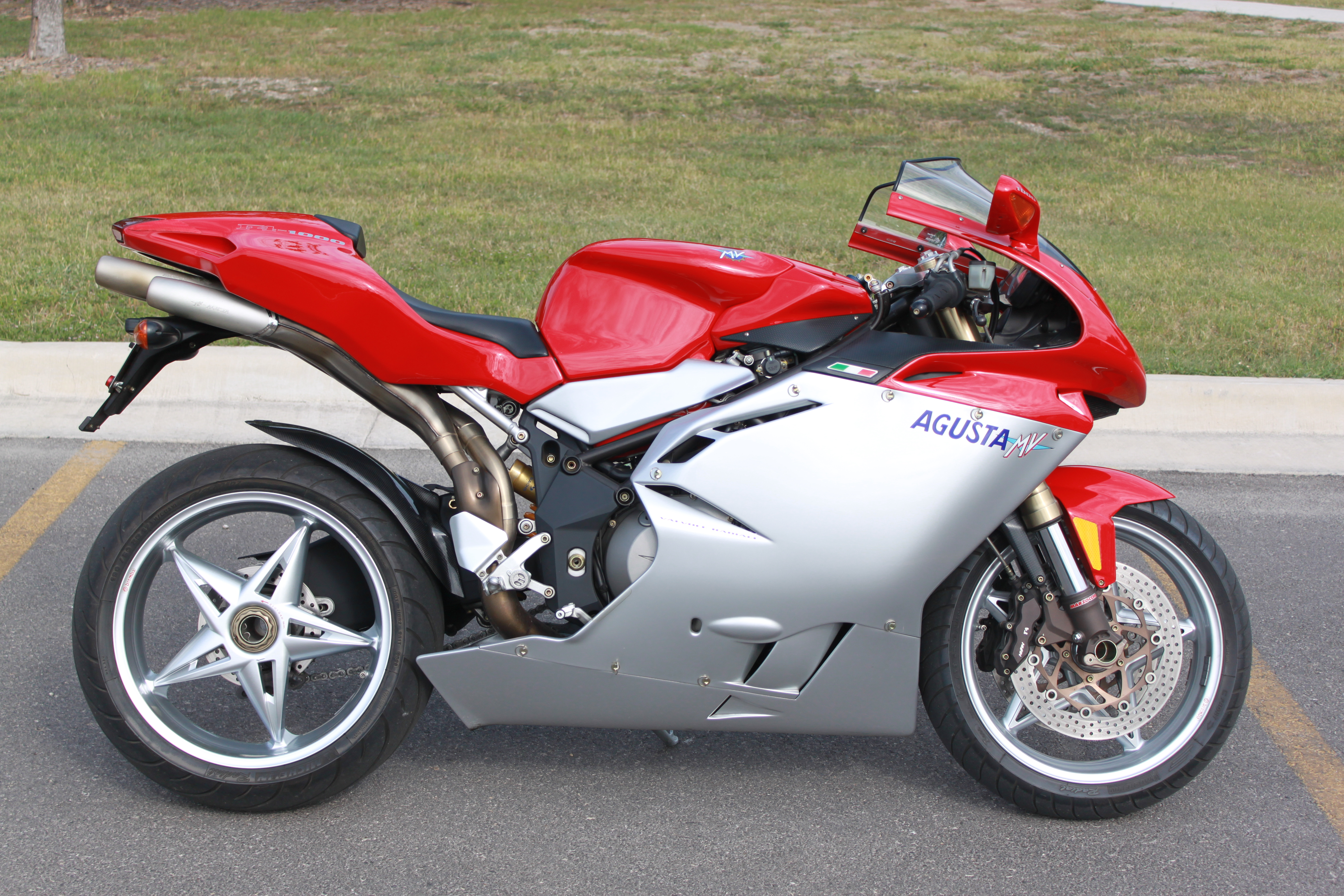
2005 MV Agusta F4 1000 S

The first mass-produced F4 1000, the F4 1000 S, was released in 2005 and came with the same 166 bhp engine of the AGO model. Compared to the previous 750 cc models, the 1000 S was fitted with 50 mm Marzocchi front upside-down fork and Sachs rear shock absorber with hydraulic control of spring pre-load. The screen had been re-profiled and adjustable footrests fitted. The machine was available in red/silver, silver/yellow, Silver/Blue and Matte Black. Top Speed was 184 mph (296 km/h) and a standing quarter mile in 11.4 seconds.

The 1000 S was a single-seater, but was available as the F4 1000 S 1+1 version with provision for a pillion a passenger.

=== F4 Tamburini ===
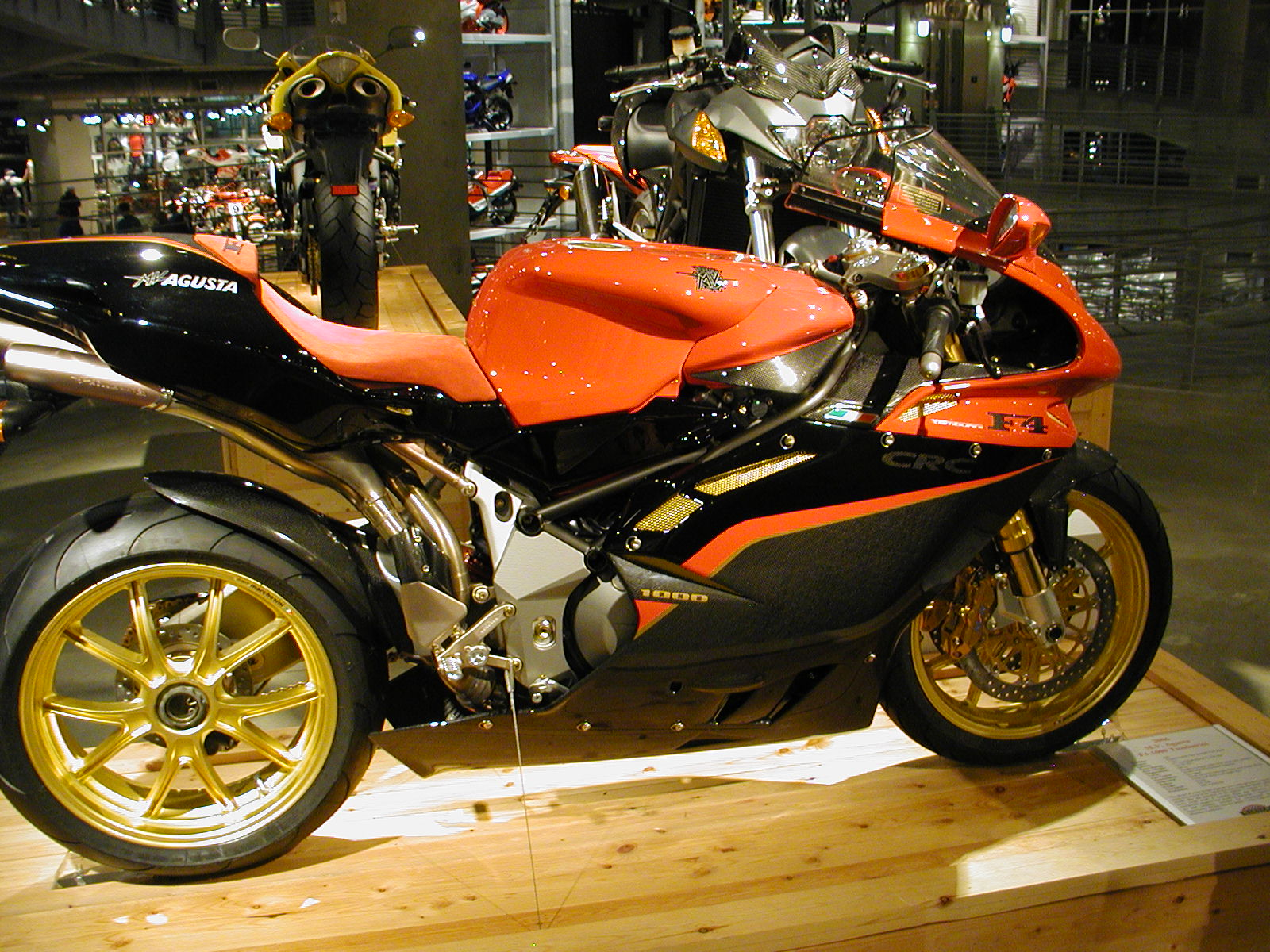
2005 MV Agusta F4 1000 Tamburini

The F4 Tamburini was a special edition of the F4 1000 S released in 2005. It was the first F4 to be equipped with the Torque Shift System (TSS), which varies the length of the intake trumpets with speed in order to provide optimum torque at low and high engine speeds. Engine output was a claimed 173 bhp (129 kW) at 11,750 rpm and claimed top speed was 190.6 mph (306.7 km/h). All the bodywork was carbon fibre except for the fuel tank. Only 300 were produced. The bike is named after its designer Massimo Tamburini.

Motorcycles make us dream. They have different colors, they have different sounds. They have shapes that sometimes show what inspired their designers. Sometimes these creations are real works of art that turn the designer into an artist. This is the case with Massimo Tamburini, a design engineer who has revolutionized the concepts of sports motorcycles by raising them to new limits of performance and granting them unparalleled beauty. To pay tribute to this unique individual, I wanted his latest creation to be called after him with a limited production edition with very specific features. This machine has that look that all motorcyclists love along with the mechanical sophistication that they have always dreamed of. It has the heart of a racing bike yet all the glamour of an individual work of art. It has all of our history and passion in its soul.

— Claudio Castiglioni

=== F4 1000 Mamba ===
First shown at the 2003 Milan EICMA Motorcycle show, the F4 1000 Mamba was a collection of three kits to upgrade the F4 1000 S. The livery was red and black (and clear coated carbon fibre on the limited edition kits). The colours were inspired by the black mamba snake. The three versions were:

Standard Kit	Basic Kit	Full Option Kit
Unlimited production	Production limited to 300 units	Production limited to 300 units
Plastic bodywork in red/black Black painted metal fuel tank Black Alcantara seat	Carbon fibre bodywork in clear/red/black Black painted metal fuel tank Black Alcantara seat Engraved plaque with the number of the bike	Carbon fibre bodywork in clear/red/black Carbon fibre air ducts, wiring covers, air-box panels, chain & footrest guards Black painted metal fuel tank Black Alcantara seat Silver Marchesini ten-spoke forged aluminium Engraved plaque with the number of the bike

=== F4 1000 Nero ===
At the request of Australian MV Agusta distributor and former motorcycle champion Paul Feeney, the limited edition F4 1000 Nero was produced. The all black bike was limited to 21 examples.

=== F4 Veltro ===
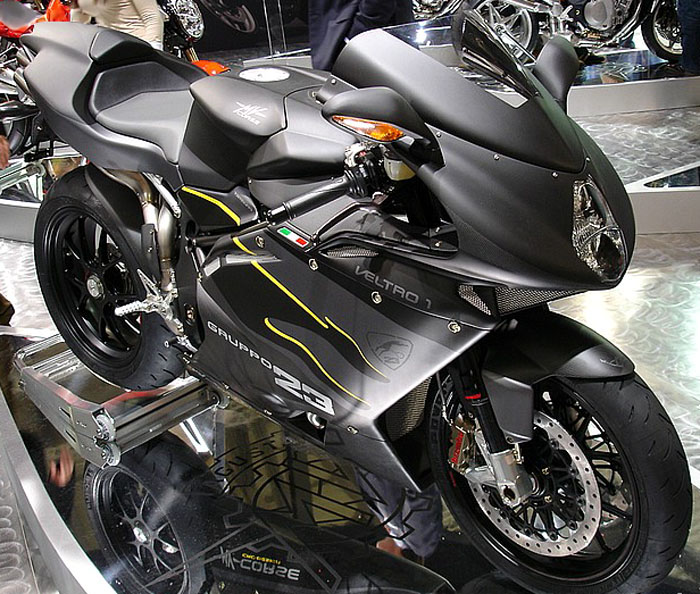
MV Agusta F4 Veltro Strada

The 2006 F4 Veltro came in two models, the F4 Veltro Strada (road) and F4 Veltro Pista (race). Ninety-nine examples of the Strada were produced, as well as 23 examples of the Pista. The engine is from the Tamburini, producing 173 bhp (129 kW) in the Strada, and 185 bhp (138 kW) in the Pista, with a racing exhaust fitted. The Veltro models engines feature the TSS system from the Tamburini. The machines were built at the Cagiva Research Center in San Marino. These are considered by to be the most race-oriented F4's made.

The Veltro Strada is equipped with a full complement of carbon fibre (fairings, tail, airbox, mud guards, fenders, air ducts, heat shield) and magnesium frame plates.

In addition to the parts found on the Veltro Strada, the Veltro Pista is equipped with an oversized radiator, carbon fibre fuel tank, and a magnesium triple clamp and swinging arm, which brings the weight down to 350 pounds (160 kg). Being for track use only, the Pista is not equipped with lights.

Veltro is Italian for greyhound, and is also the mascot of Gruppo 23 of the Aeronautica Militare (Italian Air Force), whose logo features on the bike. Finish is matt black and there are graphics in the style of a WWII Italian fighter plane.

=== F4 CC ===
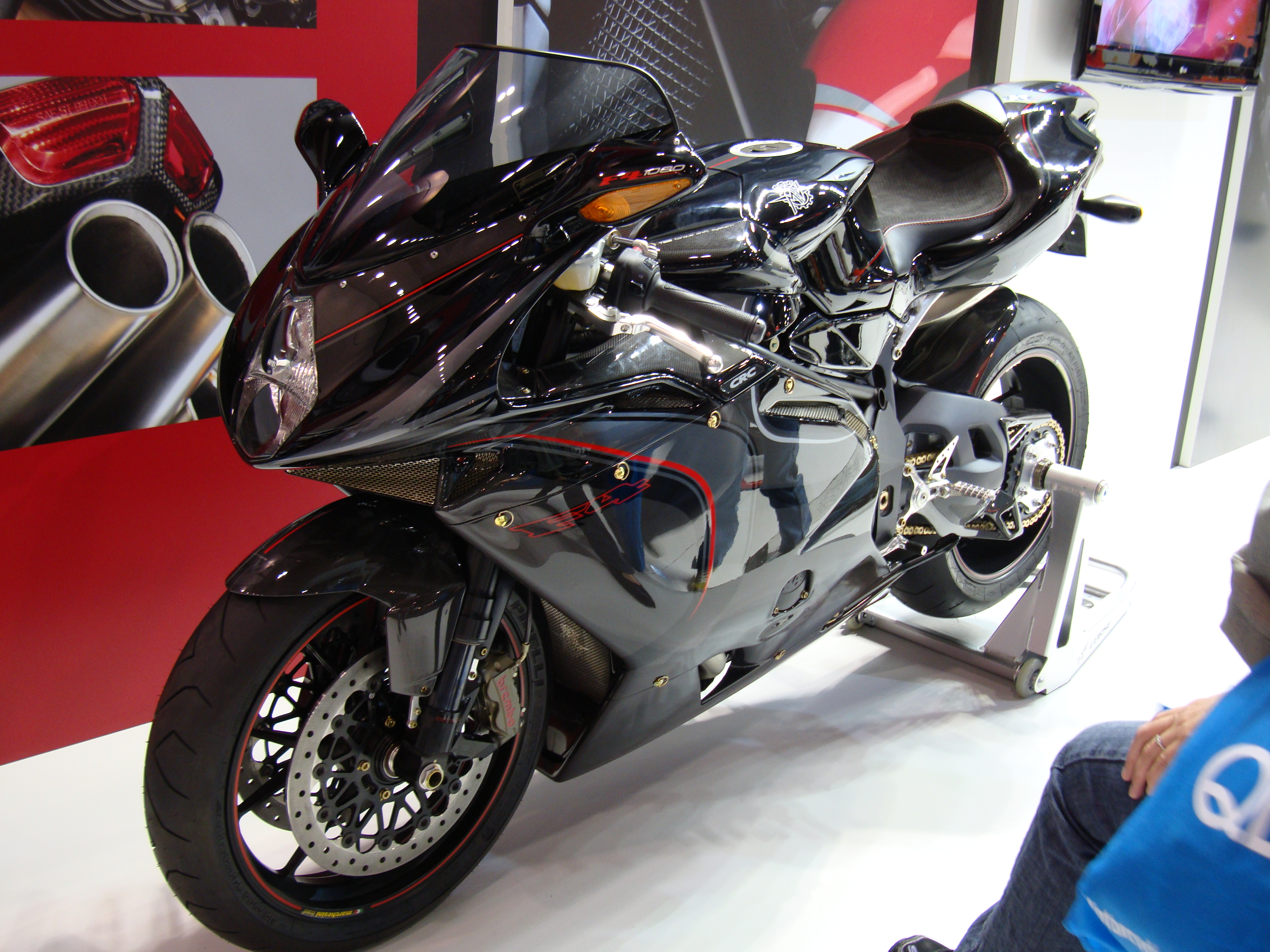
2007 MV Agusta F4 CC

The F4 CC, named after Claudio Castiglioni, the managing director of MV Agusta, was first shown at the Milan EICMA in 2006.

I decided to put my name to this bike as I originally dreamed of it for myself

— Claudio Castiglioni

The F4 CC uses a new 1,078 cc engine that delivers 200 hp (147 kW) at 12,200 rpm. The engine has a 3 mm larger bore than the 998 cc engines to produce the extra displacement. Inlet valves are of a bigger diameter and the valve train is manufactured by American specialists Del West. The MV Agusta racing department led by Andea Goggi polished and lightened many of the internal components, many being made from exotic metals. The engine is 4 kg lighter than the 1,000 R engine.

The frame is the standard F4 item, but with magnesium frame plates and swinging arm. Front forks are carbon nitride treated 50 mm Marzocchi units with a Sachs racing shock absorber at the rear. Brakes are Brembo racing items and Brembo Super Light Y-spoked wheels are fitted. Bodywork features extensive use of carbon fibre. Top speed was limited to 315 km/h (196 mph) as no road tire was available that could exceed that speed.

The model had a price tag of $120,000, and came with a matching, numbered Girard-Perregaux watch and a Trussardi special leather jacket. Only 100 machines were made available.

=== F4 1000 Senna ===
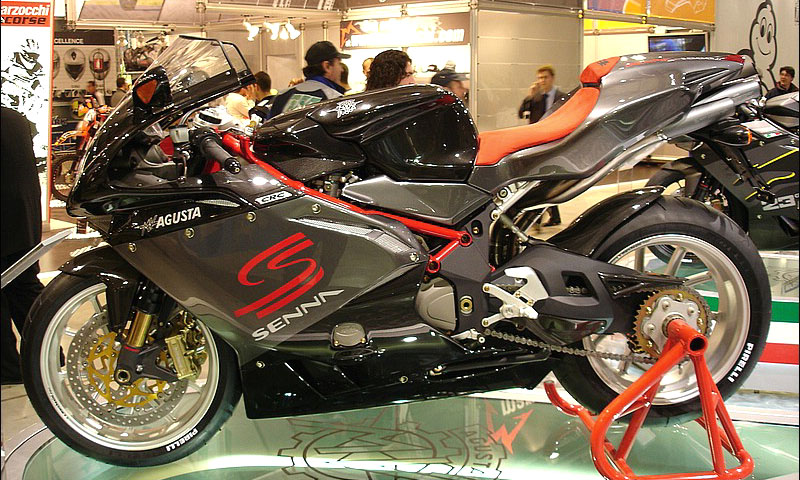
2006 MV Agusta F4 1000 Senna

The F4 1000 Senna was a special edition of the F4 1000 R released in 2006. The model used the same 174 bhp as the 1000 R. Visually it was similar to the 2002 F4 750 Senna and again proceeds from its sales went to Senna's foundation Instituto Ayrton Senna. Front forks were black titanium nitride treated 50 mm upside-down Marzocchi items. The gold, 4-pot, radial, Brembo Racing “Serie Oro” front brake calipers were exclusive to this model. Silver Marchesini wheels with Y-shaped spokes were fitted.

The livery was black/grey over a metallic silver base, with red highlighting, including the Senna logo. A red Alcantara seat was fitted, embroidered with the F4 logo.

=== F4 1000 R ===
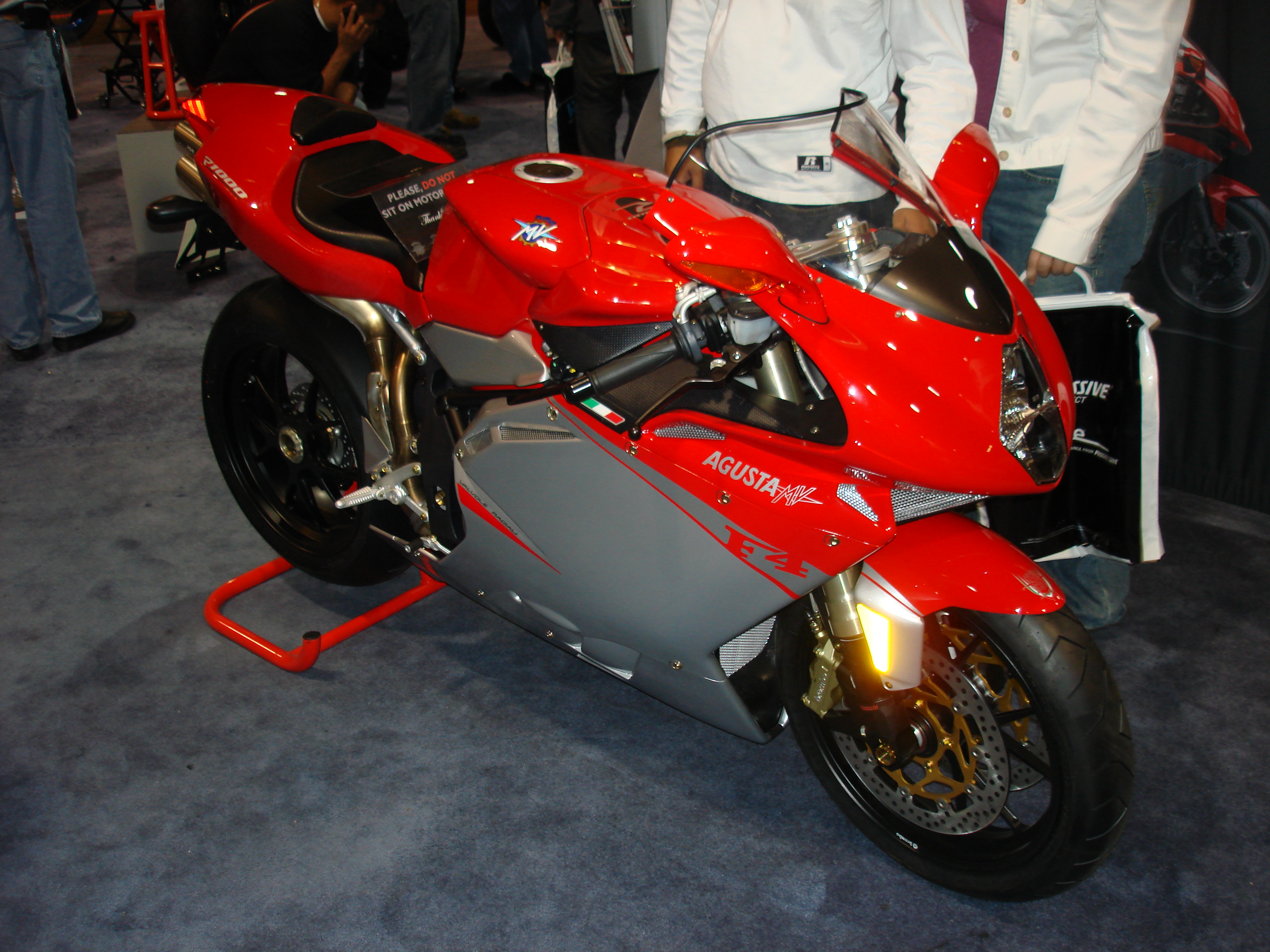
2007 MV Agusta F4 1000 R

The second mass-produced F4 1000, the F4 1000 R was released in 2007 and came with an updated 174 bhp (130 kW) engine. The engine had been extensively re-worked compared to previous models. A new frame was used on the 1000 R, which was an evolution of the frame used on previous models. The bike also has upgraded Brembo Monobloc radial brakes, forged black Brembo wheels, carbon-nitride coated Marzocchi upside down fork and an upgraded Sachs rear shock absorber (compression & rebound damping adjustable in high & low speed range). The 1000 R engine does not utilize the TSS system. The bike was available in black "Bodoni" livery, or an upgrade of the traditional red/silver “Corse” racing livery. The machine was intended to lie between the 1000 S and the limited edition F4 Senna.

In August 2006 an F4 1000 R was used to set a record for the fastest production class 1000 cc motorcycle of 185.882 mph (299.148 km/h) at Bonneville Salt Flats.

An F4 1000 R 1+1 (Biposto) version was available that added provision for a pillion passenger.

=== F4 Corse ===
A limited edition kit was available for the F4 1000 R, the F4 Corse, that added carbon fibre bodywork, a new exhaust and silver wheels. 300 kits were available for the 1000 R, and a similar number for the 1+1. The kits came with a certificate of authenticity and a numbered silver plaque for the top yoke.

=== F4 R 312 ===
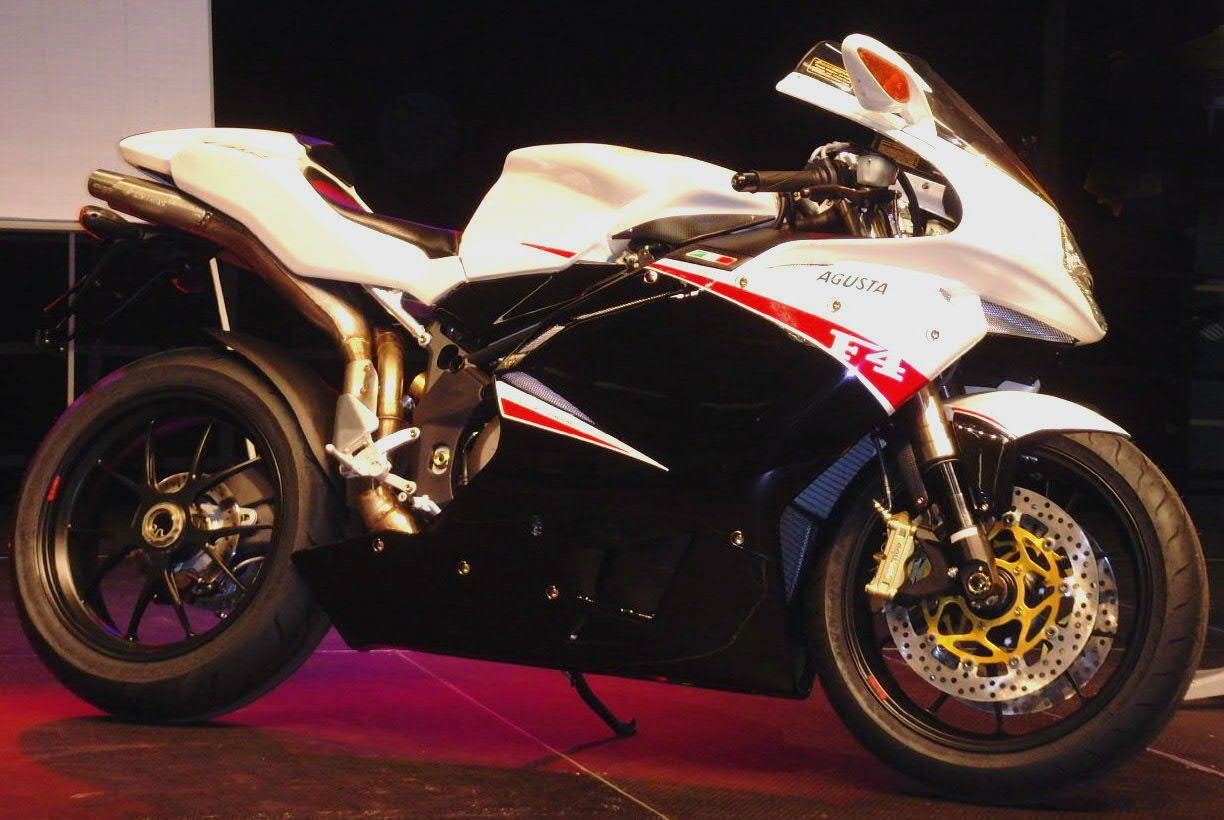
2008 MV Agusta F4 1000 R 312

The F4 R 312 was released in late 2007 as a 2008 model. It is an evolution of the F4 1000 R model, which it replaced. The engine had been uprated to comply with the Euro 3 emissions standard. It also produced an additional 9 bhp, to give a total of 183 hp (136 kW) and 115 Nm (85 lbf⋅ft) torque. This is due to 30 mm titanium intake valves, modified camshafts and 48 mm throttle bodies.

The chassis, suspension, brakes and wheels were from the 1000 R. The bike was offered in a gloss black/grey, pearl white/black or "Corsa" red/silver finish.

A two-seater version, the F4 R 312 1+1 was also available.

The "312" in the name refers to the bike's claimed top speed of 312 km/h (194 mph). Italy's Motociclismo magazine verified MV Agusta's claim, achieving a top speed of 193.24 mph (310.99 km/h) at the Nardò Ring, and beating the Suzuki Hayabusa in top speed.

=== F4 RR 312 ===
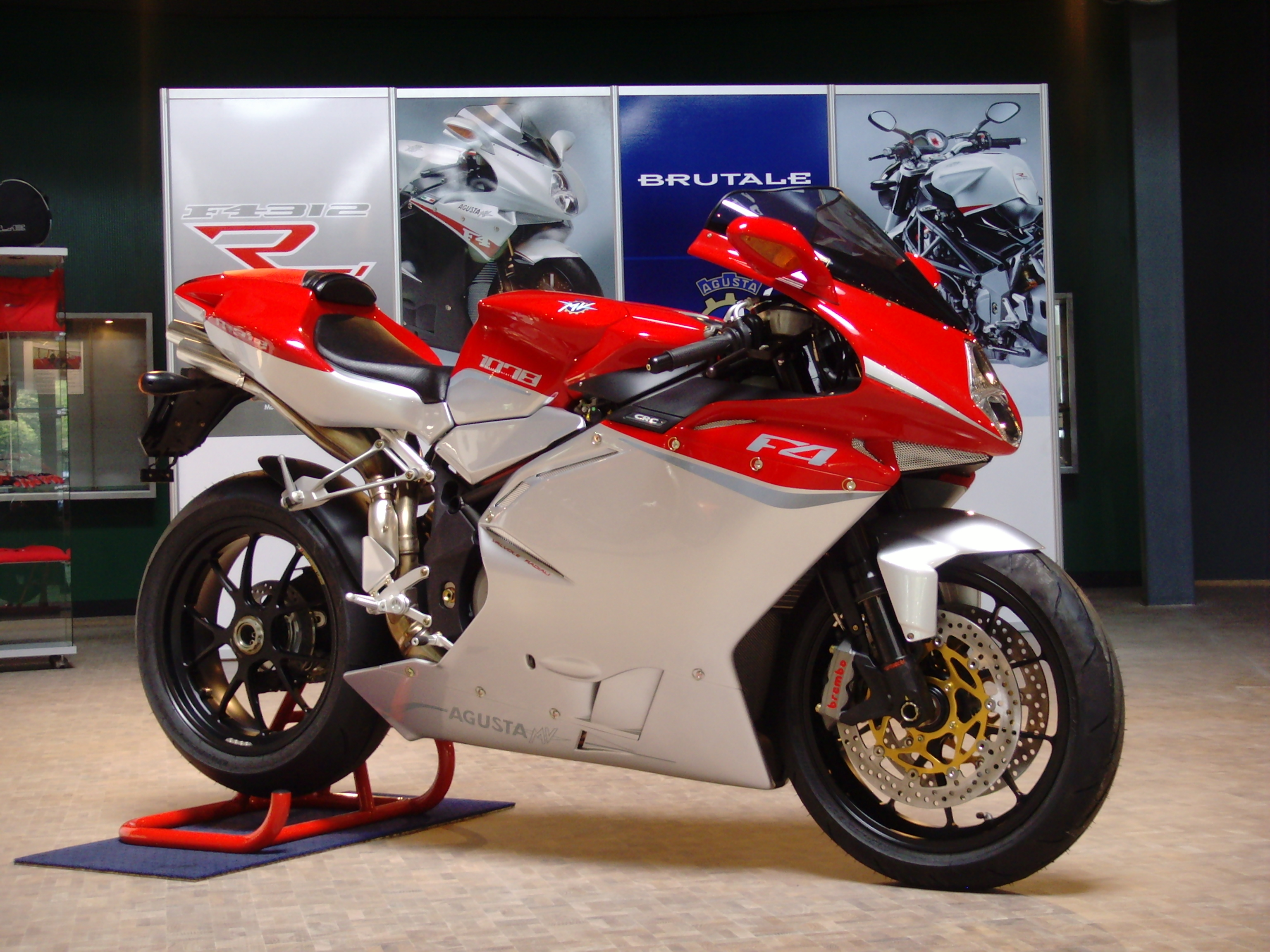
2009 MV Agusta F4 1078 RR 312

For 2009, MV Agusta replaced the F4 R 312 with the 1,078 cc F4 RR 312. A 1,078 engine had previously been used in the F4 CC. The engine in the RR produced 190 hp (140 kW) at 12,200 rpm. The engine had a wide spread of power, maximum torque being produced at 8,200 rpm. A new slipper clutch was fitted, and also a new instrument panel. Chassis parts were carried over from the R 312 model and the bike was available in racing red/Silver, pearl white/gloss black or black/anthracite grey finishes.

The bike was known for its "hyper acceleration".

A two-seater version, the F4 RR 312 1+1 was also available.

=== F4 1078 RR 312 Edizione Finale ===
In 2010 the F4 1078 RR 312 Edizione Finale was released as the final model of the original F4 series. The model featured a custom quilted leather saddle and a special identification plaque. Only 30 units were made, all of which were sold in Japan.

== Second generation ==
=== F4 ===
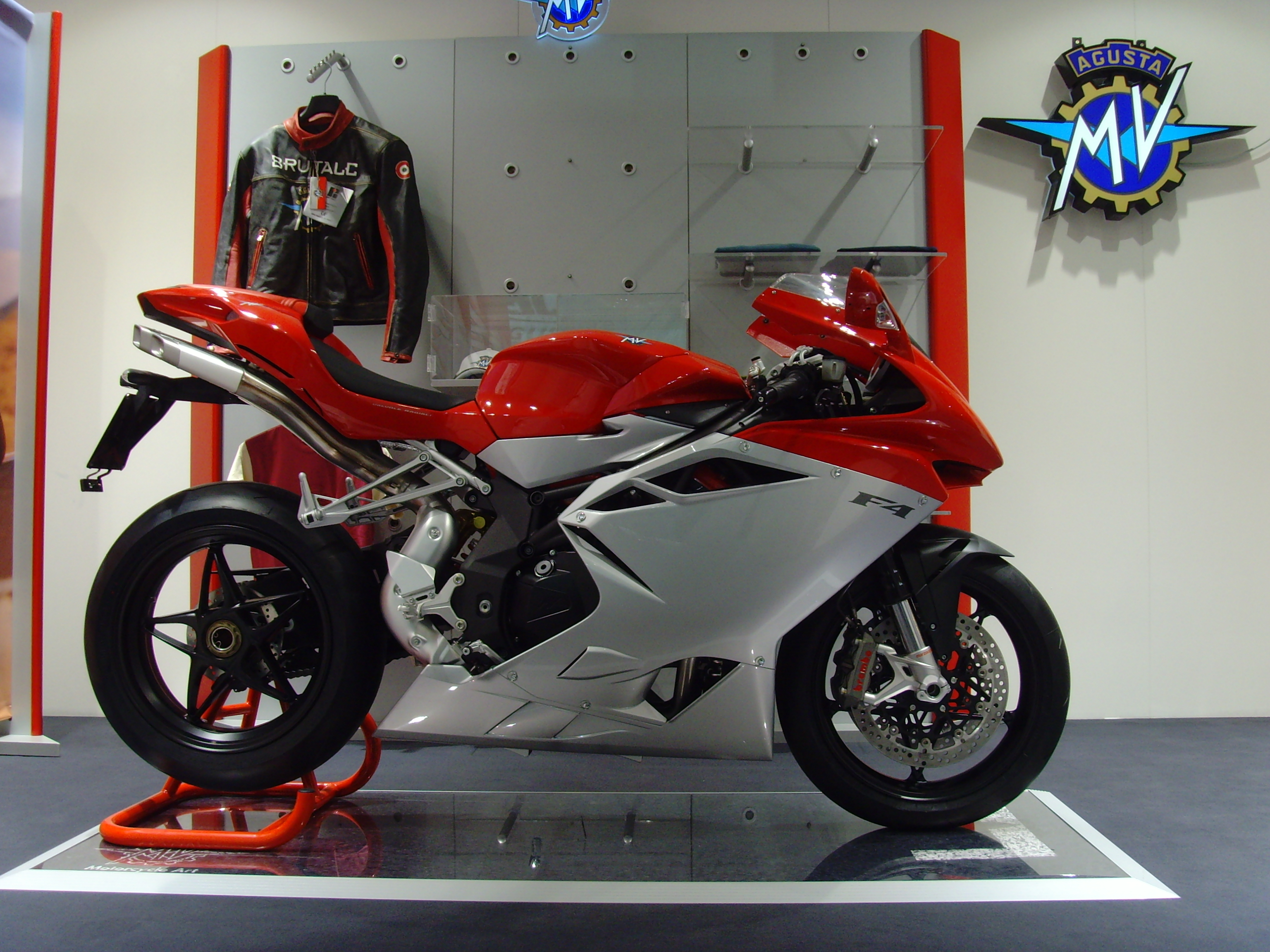
2010 MV Agusta F4

In 2010, the new F4 was introduced. The engine, whilst retaining the bore and stroke and 16 radial valve layout of the previous engines, was extensively redesigned. Changes include a new crankshaft, lighter conrods, shorter inlet tracts, titanium inlet valves, twin injectors, oil pump, deeper sump, cooling system and generator. The new unit produces 186 bhp (139 kW) at 12,900 rpm.

A new frame was used that was lighter but more rigid than previous models. The swing arm pivot mas been relocated to allow a longer swinging arm without increasing the wheelbase. 50 mm Upside down Marzocchi forks are fitted to the front and a fully adjustable Sachs shock absorber is fitted to the rear. Ride height is adjustable. Twin 320 mm disc brakes are fitted on the front with radial Brembo 4-pot calipers, and a 210mm rear disc with Nissin 4-pot caliper on the rear.

The bike was available in pastel red/metallic silver, gloss black/matt black or titanium grey/admiral grey and was 10 kg lighter and 40 mm narrower than its predecessors.

In 2013, the F4 received a 195 bhp version of the short-stroke "Corsacorta" engine that had previously been used on the F4 R and F4 RR models.

=== F4 Frecce Tricolori ===
The F4 Frecce Tricolori was a limited-edition motorcycle released in late 2010 to commemorate the 50th anniversary of the Frecce Tricolori, the aerobatic demonstration team of the Italian Aeronautica Militare. 11 machines were produced, reflecting the 11 aircraft of the display team. The machines featured titanium and carbon fibre parts, and were finished in the blue/white/red Tricolori livery of the display aircraft.

Each machine carries a silver plate with the number and designation of the aircraft it was associated with. The machines were delivered at a dedicated event day at the Rivolto Air Force Base, home of the Frecce Tricolori.

=== F4 RR ===
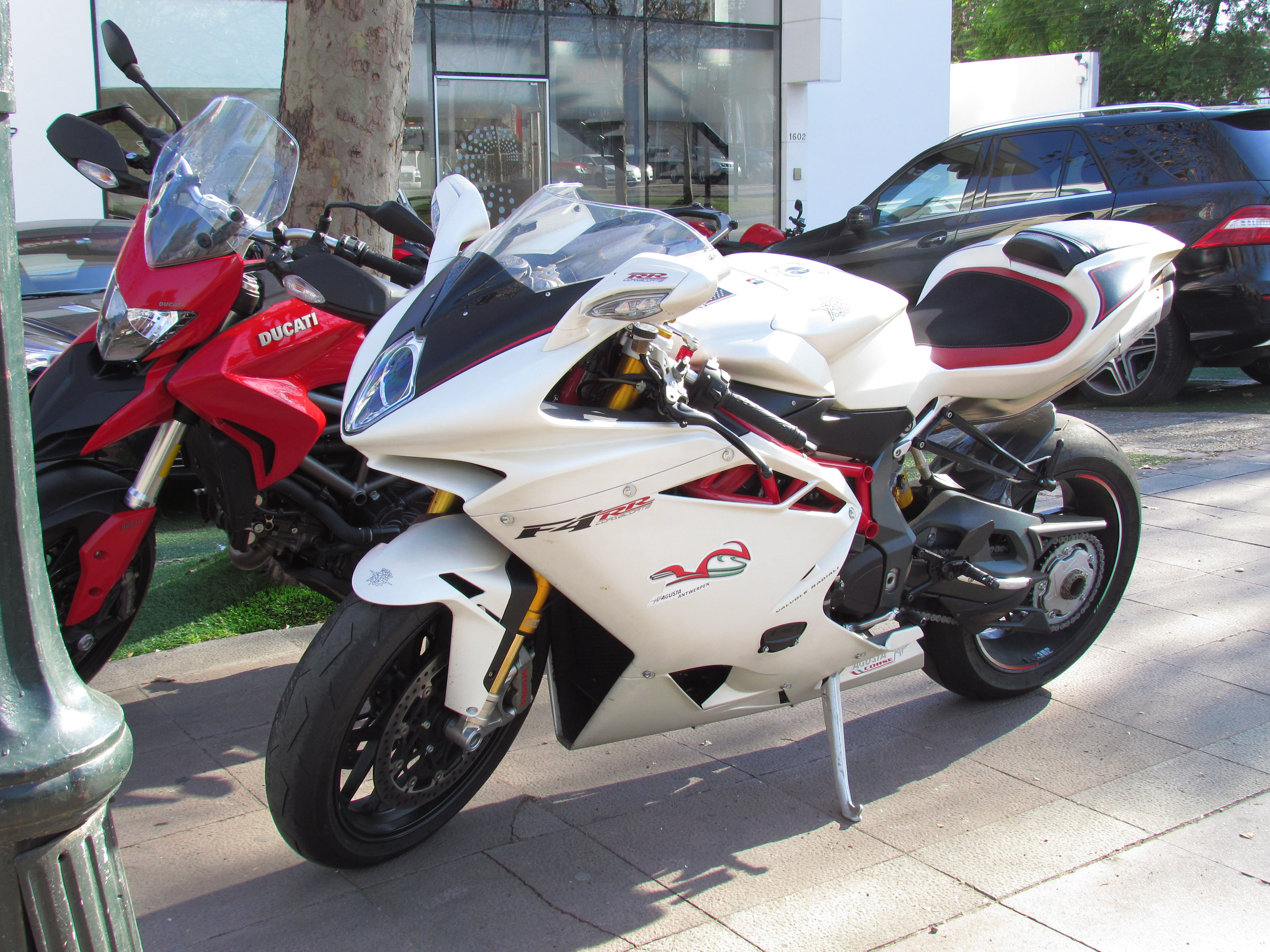
MV Agusta F4 RR in pearl white finish

The F4 RR, also known as the F4 RR Corsacorta (short stroke) was first introduced in 2011. It featured a new short-stroke version of F4 engine, with an output of 201 bhp (150 kW) at 13,400 rpm. Bore was increased from 76 to 79 mm and stroke reduced from 55 to 50.9 mm. Virtually every component in the engine was new, including: primary drive; cylinder head; larger titanium valves; lightweight forged pistons in "aerospace RR alloy" and two fuel injectors per cylinder. The "TSS" variable length intake ducts system was used. A close-ratio gearbox was fitted.

The frame had an adjustable steering head and an adjustable swinging arm pivot. Front forks were 43 mm, titanium nitride coated Öhlins NIX upside-down units. At the rear was an Öhlins Racing TTX 36 rear shock, with multiple adjustments, including ride height. Lightweight forged aluminium wheels and Brembo racing brakes were fitted.

The model was available in pastel red/white or matt pearl white finish.

=== F4 R ===
In 2012, MV introduced a more affordable version of the F4 RR, the F4 R. The "R" was introduced at a cost of €18,500, €4,100 less than the F4 RR.

A variant of the "Corsacorta" short-stroke engine was used, which gave 195 bhp (145 kW) at 13,500 rpm. Frame was from the F4 as were the 50 mm Marzocchi forks, rear Sach shock absorber, Brembo front brakes and cast wheels.

The machine was available in a red/grey or white/medium grey finish.

=== F4 RC ===
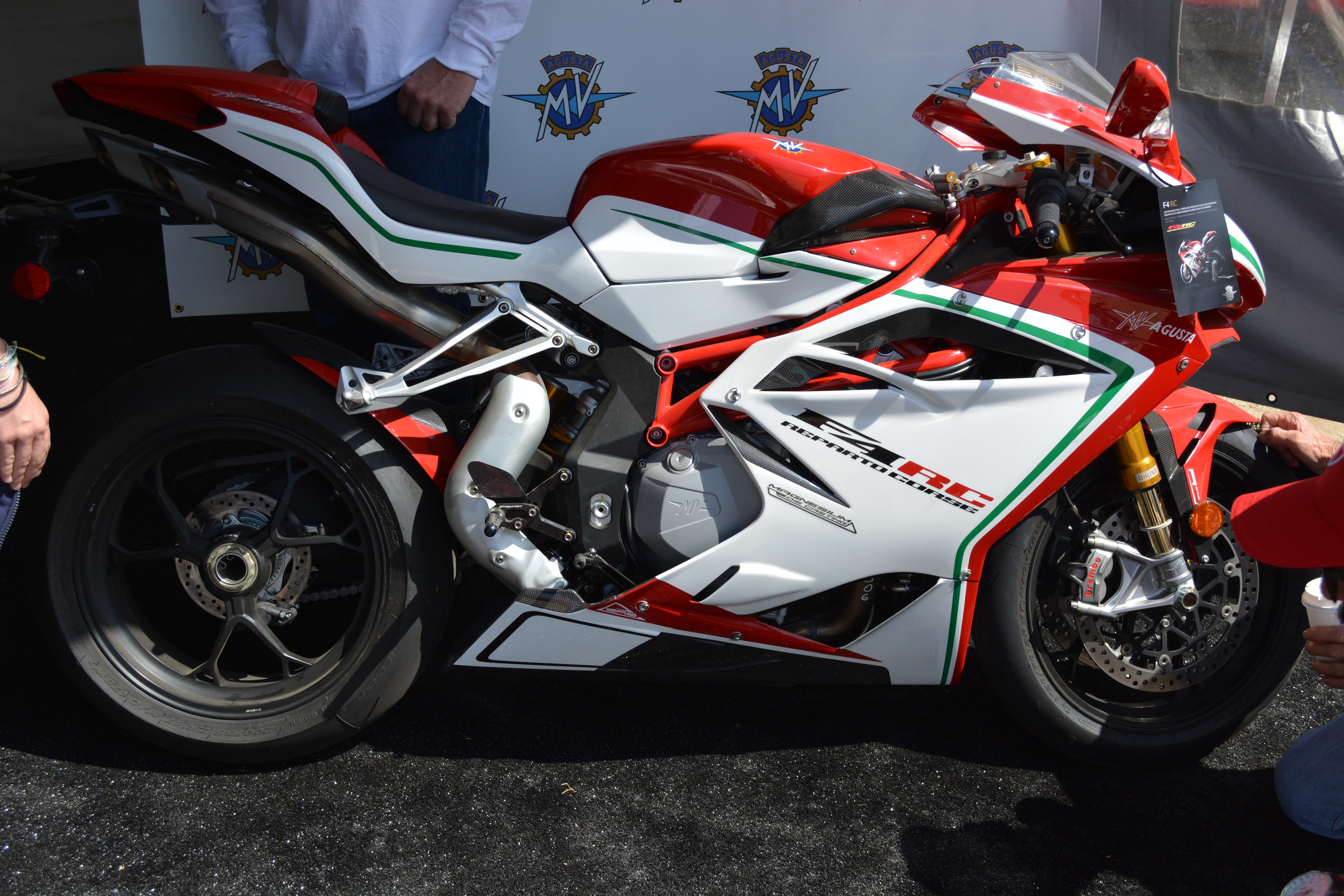
MV Agusta F4 RC (Pre-Production)

The limited edition F4 RC (Reparto Corse) was introduced in 2015 and manufactured to Superbike World Championship specifications. An updated version of the short-stroke "Corsacorta" engine was fitted. Output was increased to 205 bhp at 13,450 rpm with the road exhaust, and 212 bhp with the supplied race kit which includes Termignoni full system titanium exhaust and matching ECU (For later year further F4 RC race kit included with SC-Project slip-on titanium single exit exhaust instead).

Much use was made of magnesium, titanium and carbon fibre to reduce the weight 7 kg compared to the F4 RR. The race kit reduced weight by a further 6 kg. Ohlins suspension and Brembo bakes were fitted, both the same as fitted to the RR model.

The livery was the same red, white and green as used by Leon Camier in the Superbike Championship. Production was limited to 250 machines.

Following the termination of the partnership between MV Agusta and Mercedes-AMG in 2016, the machine was relaunched in 2017 without the AMG graphics in the livery. A further change to the livery in 2018 to reflect the colours used in WSBK that season.

=== F4 LH44 ===
In 2017, the limited edition F4 LH44 was announced. Based on the F4 RC, the machine features a livery designed by F1 world champion Lewis Hamilton, in conjunction with the CRC (Castiglioni Research Center). The machine is finished in red and black with a white frame. Suspension, Öhlins USD NIX 30 TiN-coated forks and TTX 36 rear shock, has been anodised in black by special arrangement with Öhlins. Special edition Pirelli DIABLO Supercorsa SP tyres are fitted which feature red sidewalls and the LH44 logo. Production is limited to 44 machines, 44 being Hamilton's race number in F1.

=== F4 Claudio ===
The F4 Claudio, named after Claudio Castiglioni, was released in November 2018 at EICMA. It is a limited-edition model based on the F4 RC and marks the last update that will be given to the F4 series due to the Euro4 emissions laws. It shares many of the features seen on the MV Agusta model that competes in the World Superbike Championship. The engine has titanium connecting rods, the crankshaft has been specifically designed and balanced, and the combustion chamber is fitted with radially set valves. In track set-up, claimed maximum power is rated at 158 kW (212 hp; 215 PS) at 13,600 rpm, with a peak torque of 115 N⋅m (85 lbf⋅ft) at 9,300 rpm. In standard road-legal set-up, maximum power still rated at 153 kW (205 hp; 208 PS).

The F4 Claudio uses exclusively dual exit titanium SC-Project racing exhaust system with a dedicated control unit. Also equipped with an AiM MXS racing dashboard with data acquisition, integrated GPS and dedicated software. There is a wide range of electronics with four maps on offer, which can be selected instantaneously via the racing push-buttons. The upgrade also includes Brembo T-Drive floating dual 320 mm (13 in) front disc brakes, and Black Öhlins NIX30 shock absorbers.

Further, More carbon fiber has been used extensively to keep the bike's weight lower than F4 RC, including a BST full carbon fiber fairing and lightweight carbon wheels. The weight figure stands at 174.5 kg (385 lb) dry with the race kit on, and 183 kg (403 lb) in street trim. The bolts and screws are made from titanium, with CNC-machined aluminium alloys used extensively on functional components such as the triple clamp, height-adjustable footpegs, brake and clutch levers, and brake fluid reservoir plugs and filler cap. The F4 Claudio is limited to 100 bikes, with the price starting from $83,000.

== Comparison of F4 models ==
Model	Year introduced	Displacement	Power	Torque	Redline (RPM)	Dry Weight (lb)	# Produced
F4 750
F4 750 Series Oro	1999	749 cc	126 bhp (93 kW) @ 12,500 rpm	74 Nm @ 10,500 rpm	13,300	396.8	300
F4 750 S	1999	749 cc	126 bhp (94 kW) @ 12,500 rpm	74 Nm @ 10,500 rpm	13,300	421.1	
F4 750 S Evo 02 F4 750 S Evo 03	2002; 2003	749 cc	136 bhp (101 kW) @ 12,600 rpm	81 Nm @ 10,500 rpm	13,300	421.1	
F4 Senna	2002	749 cc	136 bhp (101 kW) @ 12,600 rpm	81 Nm @ 10,500 rpm	13,900	413.6	300
F4 SPR	2004	749 cc	146 bhp (109 kW) @ 13,000 rpm	80 Nm @ 11,000 rpm	13,900	413.6	300
F4 SR	2004	749 cc	146 bhp (109 kW) @ 13,000 rpm	80 Nm @ 11,000 rpm	13,900	421.1	300
F4 1000
F4 1000 AGO	2005	998 cc	166 bhp (124 kW) @ 11,750 rpm	109 Nm @ 10,200 rpm	12,700	418.8	300
F4 1000 S F4 1000 S 1+1	2005	998 cc	166 bhp (124 kW) @ 11,750 rpm	109 Nm @ 10,200 rpm	12,700	423.3	
F4 1000 Tamburini	2005	998 cc	173 bhp (129 kW) @ 11,750 rpm	113 Nm @ 9,200 rpm	12,850	412.3	300
F4 Veltro Strada	2006	998 cc	173 bhp (129 kW) @ 11,750 rpm	113 Nm @ 9,200 rpm	13,000	374.8	99
F4 Veltro Pista	2006	998 cc	185 bhp (138 kW) @12,100	121 Nm @ 9,000 rpm	13,000	350.5	23
F4 CC	2006	1,078 cc	200 bhp (150 kW) @ 12,200 rpm	125 Nm @ 9,000 rpm	13,000	412.6	100
F4 1000 Senna	2006	998 cc	174 bhp (130 kW) @ 11,900 rpm	111 Nm @ 10,000 rpm	13,000	418.8	300
F4 1000 R F4 1000 R 1+1	2007	998 cc	174 bhp (130 kW) @ 11,900 rpm	111 Nm @ 10,000 rpm	13,000	423.3	
F4 R 312 F4 R 312 1+1	2008	998 cc	183 bhp (136 kW) @ 13,000 rpm	115 Nm @10,000	13,000	423.3; 425.5	
F4 RR 312 F4 RR 312 1+1 F4 1078 RR 312 Edizione Finale	2009	1,078 cc	190 bhp (140 kW) @ 12,200 rpm	124 Nm @ 8,200 rpm	13,000	423.3; 425.5; 423.3	30
Second generation
F4	2010; 2013	998 cc	186 bhp (139 kW) @ 12,900 rpm 195 bhp (145 kW) @ 13,400 rpm	114 Nm @ 9,500 rpm 110 Nm @ 9,600 rpm	13,500	423	
F4 Frecce Tricolori	2010	998 cc	186 bhp (139 kW) @ 12,900 rpm	: 114 Nm @ 9,500 rpm	13,500		11
F4 RR	2011	998 cc	201 bhp (150 kW) @ 13,400 rpm	114 Nm @ 9,200 rpm	13,700	423	
F4 R	2012	998 cc	195 bhp (145 kW) @ 13,500 rpm	110 Nm @ 9,600 rpm	13,500	423	
F4 RC	2015	998 cc	212 bhp (158 kW) @ 13,600 rpm	115 Nm @ 9,300 rpm		395	250
F4 LH44	2017	998 cc	212 bhp (158 kW) @ 13,600 rpm	115 Nm @ 9,300 rpm		395	44
F4 Claudio	2018	998 cc	212 bhp (158 kW) @ 13,600 rpm	115 Nm @ 9,300 rpm		395	100

== Racing ==
Giovanni Castiglioni, chairman and President of MV Agusta, signed an agreement with Alexander Yakhnich, Chairman of Yakhnich Motorsport, to establish the new MV Agusta Reparto Corse for the 2014 season. The team was operated by Yakhnich Motorsport and competed in the World Supersport, using the MV Agusta F3, and World Superbike Championships, using the F4 In June 2014 Castiglioni and Yakhnich signed an agreement that stipulated MV Agusta would take over all operations concerning the racing team.

For the 2014 WSBK Season, Claudio Corti rode for the team and finished 17th in the championship. Leon Camier substituted for Corti at Laguna Seca and a privately entered F4 ridden by Nicolas Salchaud competed at Magny-Cours.

In 2015, 2016 and 2017, Leon Camier was the rider for the team, finishing 13th, 8th and 8th in the Championship in these years.

MV Agusta Reparto Corse partnered with Team Vamag in late 2017 in preparation for the 2018 Supersport World Championship. The team was known as MV Agusta Reparto Corse by Vamag that season. Jordi Torres was the team's rider except for the last two races, where Maximilian Scheib rode. Torres finished 13th in the championship.

Records
Preceded by Kawasaki Ninja ZX-14	Fastest production motorcycle 2007–2010^{1}	Succeeded by Ducati 1199 Panigale R
Notes and references
1. Fastest in production during its lifetime, but not record holder
