= Cyclone (motorcycle) =

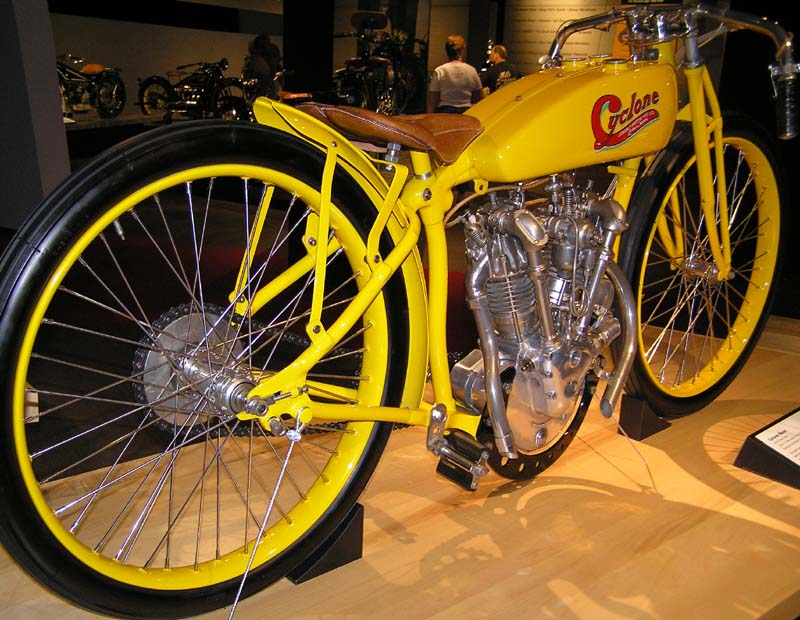
- 1914 Cyclone at The Art of the Motorcycle in Memphis
- Manufacturer: Joerns Motor Manufacturing Company
- Production: 1912–1917
- Engine: 61 cu in (1,000 cc) 45° SOHC V-Twin
- Power: 45 horsepower (34 kW)

Cyclone is a motorcycle that was manufactured by Joerns Motor Manufacturing Company located in St. Paul, Minnesota from 1912 through 1917. Later manufacture was moved to Sheboygan, Wisconsin.

== History ==
The Cyclone was a short-lived brand but made its mark by doing very well on the board track racing circuits of 1910s through the 1920s. Cyclones also did well on the dirt track racing circuit of the day winning many races. In 1914, an Excelsior lost its one-mile speed record title to a Cyclone.

In 2025, a 1915 Cyclone Board Track Racer restored by Stephen Wright was sold for US$1,330,000 at auction.It was the highest price paid for a motorcycle at auction at that time.

== Engine ==
Designed by engineer Andrew Strand, a powerful 61 cubic inch (996cc) 45 degree V-Twin SOHC, 45 horsepower engine was the powerplant chosen for the Cyclone. The overhead cams were driven by a vertical shaft via bevel gears and the cylinder head had a hemispherical head combustion chamber. All internal bearings were self-aligning rollers made by SKF, in an era when many motorcycle engines still used plain bushes on shafts. The Cyclone was capable of over 100 mph top speed, although the engine lubrication was crude, and it was fragile over long-distance races of 100 miles or more that were popular on the board tracks of the era. The Cyclone had no positive lubrication of its overhead camshaft, relying on a small metal well of oil to drip into the cambox, which led to overheating of the camshaft and valves in a long race.

Joerns Motor Co. sold the original Cyclone for $350.00. The Cyclone's demise came in 1917, when the Joerns Motor Co. determined that they could not compete with lower cost competition. The design was sold to Ignaz Schwinn of the Excelsior Motor Co., and a few Excelsior SOHC racers based on the Cyclone engine were built, but it was found Excelsior's Big Valve F-head (inlet-over-exhaust) racer could be made faster and more reliable, and the SOHC project was dropped in 1922.

These motorcycles were often painted in Joerns' signature canary-yellow color, however they were also available in dark blue.

Records
Preceded by Pope Model L	Fastest production motorcycle 1916–1925	Succeeded by Brough Superior SS100
