= Barry Veneman =

Dutch motorcycle racer

- Nationality: Dutch
Motorcycle racing career statistics
Grand Prix motorcycle racing
Active years	2001
First race	2001 Japanese motorcycle Grand Prix
Last race	2001 Rio de Janeiro motorcycle Grand Prix
Championships	0
Starts / Wins / Podiums / Poles / F. laps / Points; 15 / 0 / 0 / 0 / 0 / 4

Barry Veneman (born 22 March 1977) is a Dutch former motorcycle racer. He was born in Zwolle, Netherlands.

== Career statistics ==
=== Superstock European Championship ===
==== Races by year ====
(key) (Races in bold indicate pole position) (Races in italics indicate fastest lap)

Year	Bike	1	2	3	4	5	6	7	8	9	Pos	Pts
2000	Yamaha	DON; 4	MNZ	HOC; Ret	SMR; 7	VAL; 5	BRA; 9	OSC; Ret	NED; 9	BRA2; 5	9th	58

=== Grand Prix motorcycle racing ===
==== By season ====
Season	Class	Motorcycle	Race	Win	Podium	Pole	FLap	Pts	Plcd
2001	500cc	Honda	15	0	0	0	0	4	NC
Total			**15**	**0**	**0**	**0**	**0**	**4**	

===== Races by year =====
(key) (Races in bold indicate pole position) (Races in italics indicate fastest lap)

Year	Class	Bike	1	2	3	4	5	6	7	8	9	10	11	12	13	14	15	16	Pos.	Pts
2001	500cc	Honda	JPN; Ret	RSA; 19	SPA; Ret	FRA; 14	ITA; Ret	CAT	NED; 17	GBR; Ret	GER; Ret	CZE; 16	POR; 15	VAL; 15	PAC; 16	AUS; 18	MAL; Ret	BRA; 17	24th	4

=== Supersport World Championship ===
==== Races by year ====
(key) (Races in bold indicate pole position) (Races in italics indicate fastest lap)

Year	Team	1	2	3	4	5	6	7	8	9	10	11	12	13	14	Pos.	Pts
2002	Yamaha	SPA	AUS	RSA	JPN	ITA	GBR	GER	SMR	GBR	GER	NED; 20	ITA			NC	0
2003	Honda	SPA	AUS	JPN	ITA; 13	GER; 14	GBR	SMR	GBR; 19	NED; 10	ITA	FRA				24th	11
2004	Suzuki	SPA	AUS	SMR	ITA	GER; 11	GBR	GBR	NED; 10	ITA	FRA; 12					20th	15
2005	Suzuki	QAT	AUS	SPA; 7	ITA; 12	EUR; 6	SMR; 12	CZE; 10	GBR; DNS	NED	GER	ITA	FRA			14th	33
2006	Suzuki	QAT; 25	AUS; Ret	SPA; 10	ITA; Ret	EUR; 18	SMR; 16	CZE; Ret	GBR; 15	NED; 6	GER; DNS	ITA; 13	FRA; Ret			20th	22
2007	Suzuki	QAT; 9	AUS; 8	EUR; 14	SPA; Ret	NED; 4	ITA; 5	GBR; 10	SMR; 13	CZE; 10	GBR; 8	GER; 10	ITA; Ret	FRA; 23		8th	70
2008	Suzuki	QAT; 6	AUS; 20	SPA; Ret	NED; 7	ITA; Ret	GER; DNS	SMR; 8	CZE; 5	GBR; 6	EUR; 4	ITA; 5	FRA; 2	POR; Ret		8th	92
2009	Suzuki	AUS; 13	QAT; 10	SPA; 8	NED; 8	ITA; 13	RSA; Ret	USA; 14								13th	58
2009	Honda								SMR; Ret	GBR; 6	CZE; 11	GER; 12	ITA; 14	FRA; Ret	POR; 9	13th	58

=== Superbike World Championship ===
==== Races by year ====
(key) (Races in bold indicate pole position) (Races in italics indicate fastest lap)

Year	Make	1		2		3		4		5		6		7		8		9		10		11		12		13		Pos.	Pts
Year	Make	R1	R2	R1	R2	R1	R2	R1	R2	R1	R2	R1	R2	R1	R2	R1	R2	R1	R2	R1	R2	R1	R2	R1	R2	R1	R2	Pos.	Pts
2011	BMW	AUS	AUS	EUR	EUR	NED; 13	NED; 17	ITA	ITA	USA	USA	SMR	SMR	SPA	SPA	CZE	CZE	GBR	GBR	GER	GER	ITA	ITA	FRA	FRA	POR	POR	30th	3
