= Brno Superbike World Championship round =

Brno Superbike World Championship round may refer to:

- 2006 Brno Superbike World Championship round
- 2007 Brno Superbike World Championship round
- 2008 Brno Superbike World Championship round
- 2009 Brno Superbike World Championship round
- 2010 Brno Superbike World Championship round
- 2011 Brno Superbike World Championship round

== See also ==
- Brno Circuit
