= Lorenzo Lanzi =

Italian motorcycle racer

- Lorenzo Lanzi
- Nationality: Italian
- Born: October 26, 1981 (age 45); Cesena, Italy
- Current team: Tutapista Corse
- Bike number: 57
- Website: lorenzolanzi.it
Motorcycle racing career statistics
Superbike World Championship
Active years	2005–2014
Manufacturers	Ducati (2005–2010), BMW (2011), Ducati (2012–2014)
Championships	0
2014 championship position	21st (19 pts)
Starts / Wins / Podiums / Poles / F. laps / Points; 138 / 3 / 7 / 1 / 2 / 773
Supersport World Championship
Active years	2004, 2012
Manufacturers	Ducati, Honda
Championships	0
2012 championship position	17th (25 pts)
Starts / Wins / Podiums / Poles / F. laps / Points; 11 / 1 / 1 / 0 / 1 / 107

Lorenzo Lanzi (born October 26, 1981, in Cesena, Italy) is a professional motorcycle racer most known for competing in the Superbike World championship. He currently competes in the CIV Superbike Championship aboard a BMW S1000RR.

Lanzi first started racing in 1996 at the age of 15 in the Italian 125 Sport class, winning the title two years later before moving up to 125GP in the Italian and European championships. In 2001, he moved to 250GP, but his season was not a successful and he was forced to take a one-year break from racing in 2002.

2003 saw Lanzi racing for Rox Ducati in the FIM Superstock 1000 Cup. He lost out on the title by three points. In 2004, he moved to the Supersport World Championship riding for Ducati Breil, finishing the season in fifth place.

In 2005, Lanzi joined the Caracchi Ducati team in the Superbike World Championship. He had a poor start of the season and injury kept him out of two rounds. A series of eight successive top-ten finishes earned him a promotion at the EuroSpeedway Lausitz round where he raced for the Xerox sponsored Ducati factory team in place of the injured Régis Laconi. He took pole position for the races. In race one, he overshot the first corner and had to go down an escape road, seeing him cut several corners. He rejoined third, but had missed enough of the track to earn a ride-through penalty, dropping him down the field, although he fought back to eighth. However in race 2, he took the win ahead of Chris Vermeulen and Noriyuki Haga. He got his second superbike win at Magny-Cours race 2 later that year.

Lanzi's 2005 performance was enough to earn him a place on the factory team for 2006. However, whilst team-mate Troy Bayliss dominated the season, Lanzi did not win any races. He finished the season eighth overall. He remained in the team for 2007, but he was once again overshadowed by his teammate and he was often behind Ruben Xaus who was riding a 2006-spec Ducati.

Lanzi was dropped by the factory Xerox Ducati team for 2008 but continued riding a Ducati, for Team RG. He took victory in Valencia race 1 - he overtook Troy Bayliss for third on the final lap, just before Max Neukirchner and Carlos Checa collided while battling for the lead. However, this was his only top-five finish of the season, and he came 14th overall.

== Career statistics ==
=== Grand Prix motorcycle racing ===
==== Races by year ====
(key)

Year	Class	Team	1	2	3	4	5	6	7	8	9	10	11	12	13	14	15	16	Pos.	Pts
1999	125cc	Aprilia	MAL	JPN	SPA	FRA	ITA; Ret	CAT	NED	GBR	GER	CZE	IMO	VAL	AUS	RSA	BRA	ARG	NC	0
2001	250cc	Aprilia	JPN; 17	RSA; 17	SPA; 15	FRA; Ret	ITA; 11	CAT; 19	NED; 16	GBR; 14	GER; 12	CZE; 15	POR; Ret	VAL; Ret	PAC; 15	AUS; 11	MAL; Ret	BRA; 12	20th	23

=== CIV Championship (Campionato Italiano Velocita) ===
==== Races by year ====
(key) (Races in bold indicate pole position; races in italics indicate fastest lap)

Year	Class	Bike	1	2	3	4	5	Pos	Pts
2003	Stock 1000	Ducati	MIS1; 1	**MUG1**; 1	**MIS1**; Ret	**MUG2**; 1	**VAL**; 1	1st	100
2004	Supersport	Ducati	MUG	IMO; 3	VAL1	MIS	VAL2	14th	16

=== Superstock European Championship ===
==== Races by year ====
(key) (Races in bold indicate pole position) (Races in italics indicate fastest lap)

Year	Bike	1	2	3	4	5	6	7	8	9	Pos	Pts
2003	Ducati	VAL; 1	MNZ; 3	OSC; 1	SIL; Ret	SMR; 3	BRA; 11	NED; 1	IMO; 16	MAG; 1	2nd	137

=== Supersport World Championship ===
==== Races by year ====
Year	Team	1	2	3	4	5	6	7	8	9	10	11	12	13	Pos.	Pts
2004	Ducati	SPA; 4	AUS; 9	SMR; 6	ITA; 15	GER; 10	GBR; 4	GBR; 10	NED; 20	ITA; 4	FRA; 4				5th	82
2012	Honda	AUS	ITA	NED; 1	ITA	EUR	SMR	SPA	CZE	GBR	RUS	GER	POR	FRA	17th	25

=== Superbike World Championship ===
==== Races by year ====
Year	Make	1		2		3		4		5		6		7		8		9		10		11		12		13		14		Pos.	Pts
Year	Make	R1	R2	R1	R2	R1	R2	R1	R2	R1	R2	R1	R2	R1	R2	R1	R2	R1	R2	R1	R2	R1	R2	R1	R2	R1	R2	R1	R2	Pos.	Pts
2005	Ducati	QAT; Ret	QAT; 12	AUS; DSQ	AUS; 13	SPA; Ret	SPA; DNS	ITA	ITA	EUR; Ret	EUR; 11	SMR; 5	SMR; 9	CZE; 6	CZE; 6	GBR; 8	GBR; 8	NED; 7	NED; 6	**GER**; 8	**GER**; 1	ITA; Ret	ITA; C	FRA; 9	FRA; 1					9th	150
2006	Ducati	QAT; Ret	QAT; 6	AUS; 11	AUS; Ret	SPA; 3	SPA; 3	ITA; 9	ITA; 11	EUR; 13	EUR; 16	SMR; 7	SMR; 7	CZE; Ret	CZE; 9	GBR; 12	GBR; 11	NED; 7	NED; 6	GER; 8	GER; 6	ITA; 6	ITA; 7	FRA; 8	FRA; 7					8th	169
2007	Ducati	QAT; 3	QAT; 7	AUS; 6	AUS; 7	EUR; 5	EUR; 5	SPA; 6	SPA; 5	NED; 5	NED; Ret	ITA; 7	ITA; Ret	GBR; 7	GBR; C	SMR; 6	SMR; 9	CZE; 8	CZE; 7	GBR; 9	GBR; 12	GER; 8	GER; 12	ITA; 6	ITA; 7	FRA; Ret	FRA; DNS			7th	192
2008	Ducati	QAT; 16	QAT; 6	AUS; 13	AUS; 20	SPA; 1	SPA; 12	NED; DNS	NED; DNS	ITA; 14	ITA; 11	USA; 11	USA; 10	GER; Ret	GER; 20	SMR; 6	SMR; 6	CZE; Ret	CZE; 13	GBR; 11	GBR; 10	EUR; Ret	EUR; 11	ITA; 11	ITA; 18	FRA; Ret	FRA; 11	POR	POR	14th	109
2009	Ducati	AUS	AUS	QAT	QAT	SPA	SPA	NED	NED	ITA	ITA	RSA	RSA	USA; 17	USA; 14	SMR; 19	SMR; 18	GBR; 14	GBR; 11	CZE; Ret	CZE; 15	GER	GER	ITA; Ret	ITA; 11	FRA	FRA	POR	POR	26th	15
2010	Ducati	AUS; 10	AUS; 13	POR; 12	POR; 14	SPA; 8	SPA; 13	NED; 16	NED; Ret	ITA; 17	ITA; Ret	RSA	RSA	USA	USA	SMR; 12	SMR; 13	CZE; 10	CZE; 11	GBR; 15	GBR; 15	GER; 11	GER; 13	ITA; 2	ITA; 7	FRA; 11	FRA; Ret			16th	88
2011	BMW	AUS	AUS	EUR	EUR	NED	NED	ITA	ITA	USA	USA	SMR; 15	SMR; 11	SPA; Ret	SPA; 15	CZE; 17	CZE; 13	GBR	GBR	GER	GER	ITA	ITA	FRA	FRA	POR	POR			24th	10
2012	Ducati	AUS	AUS	ITA	ITA	NED	NED	ITA	ITA	EUR	EUR	USA	USA	SMR	SMR	SPA	SPA	CZE	CZE	GBR	GBR	RUS	RUS	GER; 14	GER; 16	POR; 18	POR; 10	FRA	FRA	27th	8
2013	Ducati	AUS	AUS	SPA	SPA	NED	NED	ITA	ITA	GBR	GBR	POR	POR	ITA	ITA	RUS	RUS	GBR	GBR	GER	GER	TUR	TUR	USA	USA	FRA; 10	FRA; 9	SPA; 15	SPA; 7	20th	23
2014	Ducati	AUS	AUS	SPA	SPA	NED	NED	ITA	ITA	GBR	GBR	MAL	MAL	SMR	SMR	POR	POR	USA	USA	SPA	SPA	FRA; 8	FRA; 5	QAT	QAT					21st	19

- * Season still in progress.
