= Fennema =

Fennema is a surname. Notable people with this name

- Antony Fennema (1902–84)
- Carl Fennema (1926–2022)
- Elizabeth Fennema (1928–2021), American educator
- Joanna Fennema (born 1995)
- Meindert Fennema (1946–2023), Dutch political scientist

== See also ==
- Fenneman
