= Veneman =

Veneman is a Dutch surname. Notable people with the surname include:

- Ann Veneman (born 1949), American lawyer
- Barry Veneman (born 1972), Dutch motorcycle racer
- John Veneman (1925–1982), American politician

== See also ==
- Venema
