= Miller Superbike World Championship round =

Miller Superbike World Championship round may refer to:

- 2008 Miller Superbike World Championship round
- 2009 Miller Superbike World Championship round
- 2010 Miller Superbike World Championship round
- 2011 Miller Superbike World Championship round
- 2012 Miller Superbike World Championship round

== See also ==
- Miller Motorsports Park
