= Vennemann =

Vennemann, Veneman
Origin
- Languages: Low German, Dutch
- Region of origin: northern Germany

Other names
- Variant forms: Venn, Venne

Vennemann may refer to:

- Kevin Vennemann (born 1977), German author
- Theo Vennemann (born 1937), German linguist

== Fenneman ==
- George Watt Fenneman (1919 - 1997), an American radio and television announcer
- Nevin Melancthon Fenneman (1865–1945), American geologist

== See also ==
- Veneman, a Dutch surname
