= 2003 Superstock European Championship =

2003 FIM Superstock 1000 Cup
Previous:	2002	Next:	2004
Support series: Superbike World Championship; Supersport World Championship

The 2003 Superstock European Championship was the fifth season of the FIM Superstock championship. The FIM Superstock European Championship followed the same calendar as the Superbike World Championship, missing out the none European rounds of the championship. Starting on 2 March in Circuit Ricardo Tormo and ending on 19 October in Circuit de Nevers Magny-Cours.

Michel Fabrizio won the title after beating closest rival Lorenzo Lanzi.

== Race calendar and results ==
2003 Calendar
Round	Date	Round	Circuit	Pole position	Fastest lap	Race winner	Winning team	Winning constructor
1	2 March	Spain	Circuit Ricardo Tormo	(Italy) Lorenzo Alfonsi	(Italy) Lorenzo Lanzi	(Italy) Lorenzo Lanzi	Rox Racing Team	Ducati
2	18 May	Italy	Autodromo Nazionale Monza	(Italy) Ilario Dionisi	(Italy) Michel Fabrizio	(Italy) Michel Fabrizio	Alstare Suzuki Italia	Suzuki
3	1 June	Germany	Motorsport Arena Oschersleben	(Germany) Stefan Nebel	(Italy) Lorenzo Lanzi	(Italy) Lorenzo Lanzi	Rox Racing Team	Ducati
4	15 June	United Kingdom	Silverstone Circuit	(Italy) Lorenzo Lanzi	(Italy) Lorenzo Lanzi	(Italy) Michel Fabrizio	Alstare Suzuki Italia	Suzuki
5	22 June	San Marino	Misano Adriatico	(Italy) Ilario Dionisi	(Italy) Lorenzo Lanzi	(Italy) Michel Fabrizio	Alstare Suzuki Italia	Suzuki
6	27 July	(European Union) Europe	Brands Hatch	(Italy) Michel Fabrizio	(United Kingdom) James Ellison	(United Kingdom) James Ellison	HAP Racing	Suzuki
7	7 September	Netherlands	TT Circuit Assen	(Italy) Lorenzo Lanzi	(Italy) Lorenzo Lanzi	(Italy) Lorenzo Lanzi	Rox Racing Team	Ducati
8	28 September	Italy	Autodromo Enzo e Dino Ferrari	(Italy) Michel Fabrizio	(Italy) Michel Fabrizio	(Italy) Michel Fabrizio	Alstare Suzuki Italia	Suzuki
9	19 October	France	Circuit de Nevers Magny-Cours	(Italy) Michel Fabrizio	(Italy) Lorenzo Lanzi	(Italy) Lorenzo Lanzi	Rox Racing Team	Ducati

== Entry list ==
Team	Constructor	Motorcycle	No.	Rider	Rounds
Biassono R.T. EVR Corse	Aprilia	Aprilia RSV 1000R	74	(Italy) Dario Tosolini	2
FbC Racing	Aprilia	Aprilia RSV 1000R	25	(Italy) Alessandro Brannetti	2–9
La Marca Team	Aprilia	Aprilia RSV 1000R	72	(Italy) Marco Tonini	2, 5, 8
Biassono R.T. EVR Corse	Ducati	Ducati 999S	79	(Australia) Damian Cudlin	9
Biassono R.T. EVR Corse	Ducati	Ducati 999S	86	(Italy) Ayrton Badovini	All
D.F.X. Racing	Ducati	Ducati 999S	10	(Italy) Riccardo Chiarello	All
MCT Flanders	Ducati	Ducati 999S	61	(Netherlands) Ghisbert Van Ginhoven	7–8
Rox Racing Team	Ducati	Ducati 999S	22	(Italy) Christian Dal Corso	All
Rox Racing Team	Ducati	Ducati 999S	37	(San Marino) William De Angelis	All
Rox Racing Team	Ducati	Ducati 999S	38	(Italy) Lorenzo Lanzi	All
STK Czech Accr Team	Honda	Honda CBR900RR	85	(Czech Republic) Tomáš Mikšovský	All
STK Czech Accr Team	Honda	Honda CBR900RR	96	(Czech Republic) Matěj Smrž	All
Van Zon Honda Sitra	Honda	Honda CBR900RR	77	(Belgium) Nicolas Saelens	1–5, 7–9
Alstare Suzuki Italia	Suzuki	Suzuki GSX-1000R	84	(Italy) Michel Fabrizio	All
Ben Wilson Racing	Suzuki	Suzuki GSX-1000R	93	(United Kingdom) Ben Wilson	4, 6
Beowulf Motorsports.com	Suzuki	Suzuki GSX-1000R	7	(United Kingdom) David Gatenby	All
Black Racing	Suzuki	Suzuki GSX-1000R	23	(Belgium) Gerry Gepts	1–8
Borselli Racing	Suzuki	Suzuki GSX-1000R	65	(Italy) Enrico Pasini	8
Buildbase Knotts M/C	Suzuki	Suzuki GSX-1000R	92	(United Kingdom) Luke Quigley	4, 6–7
Celani Team	Suzuki	Suzuki GSX-1000R	15	(Spain) Alex Martinez	All
Celani Team	Suzuki	Suzuki GSX-1000R	57	(Italy) Ilario Dionisi	All
CRT - Suzuki	Suzuki	Suzuki GSX-1000R	63	(Netherlands) Robert De Vries	7
DGD Motorsport	Suzuki	Suzuki GSX-1000R	27	(Belgium) Raphael De Saver	1–2
Electrolombar Racing	Suzuki	Suzuki GSX-1000R	16	(Spain) Enrique Rocamora	All
Electrolombar Racing	Suzuki	Suzuki GSX-1000R	18	(Spain) Jose Lombardo	1–2, 4–9
Elf Yoshimura Schafer M.	Suzuki	Suzuki GSX-1000R	87	(Germany) Stefan Nebel	3
EMS Racing	Suzuki	Suzuki GSX-1000R	4	(Republic of Ireland) Michael Laverty	1
EMS Racing	Suzuki	Suzuki GSX-1000R	44	(Republic of Ireland) John Laverty	All
Engel Racing	Suzuki	Suzuki GSX-1000R	89	(Germany) Stefan Kittel	3
Future Racing	Suzuki	Suzuki GSX-1000R	94	(United Kingdom) Ben Wylie	4, 6
Hans Knopper Motoren	Suzuki	Suzuki GSX-1000R	62	(Netherlands) Rafael Sinke	7
HAP Racing	Suzuki	Suzuki GSX-1000R	8	(United Kingdom) James Ellison	2–9
ICSAT Team	Suzuki	Suzuki GSX-1000R	12	(Belgium) Leroy Verboven	All
Junior Team L.M.S. Suzuki	Suzuki	Suzuki GSX-1000R	68	(France) Denis Bouan	9
Junior Team L.M.S. Suzuki	Suzuki	Suzuki GSX-1000R	69	(France) Guillaume Dietrich	9
Junior Team L.M.S. Suzuki	Suzuki	Suzuki GSX-1000R	70	(France) David Fouloi	9
K.S. Racing	Suzuki	Suzuki GSX-1000R	46	(Belgium) Tom Van Looy	All
Lloyds Autobodies	Suzuki	Suzuki GSX-1000R	91	(United Kingdom) Steve Brogan	4
Magnum Motorsport	Suzuki	Suzuki GSX-1000R	95	(United Kingdom) Kelvin Reilly	6
MIR Racing	Suzuki	Suzuki GSX-1000R	34	(Spain) Jose Manuel Hurtado	All
MIR Racing	Suzuki	Suzuki GSX-1000R	73	(Spain) Bernat Martinez	All
RRT Motorsport	Suzuki	Suzuki GSX-1000R	27	(Belgium) Raphael De Saver	3–7, 9
Schafer Motorsport	Suzuki	Suzuki GSX-1000R	88	(Germany) Max Weymann	3
Team Moto Racing	Suzuki	Suzuki GSX-1000R	76	(Italy) Fabrizio De Noni	2, 5
Team Moto Racing	Suzuki	Suzuki GSX-1000R	78	(Italy) Alessandro Buzzi	5
Team Plein Gaz	Suzuki	Suzuki GSX-1000R	41	(France) Pierrot Vanstaen	All
Team Special X Gear	Suzuki	Suzuki GSX-1000R	28	(Italy) Giacomo Romanelli	All
Team Special X Gear	Suzuki	Suzuki GSX-1000R	40	(Italy) Maurizio Bottalico	1–5
Team Special X Gear	Suzuki	Suzuki GSX-1000R	76	(Italy) Fabrizio De Noni	7–9
Italia Lorenzini by Leoni	Yamaha	Yamaha YZF-R1	5	(Italy) Alessio Velini	All
Italia Lorenzini by Leoni	Yamaha	Yamaha YZF-R1	6	(Italy) Lorenzo Alfonsi	All
Magic Bike Ducci F.R.	Yamaha	Yamaha YZF-R1	11	(Italy) Massimo Bisconti	1–4, 6–9
Magic Bike Ducci F.R.	Yamaha	Yamaha YZF-R1	21	(Italy) Fabrizio De Marco	5
UnionBike GiMotorsport	Yamaha	Yamaha YZF-R1	3	(Italy) Gianluca Vizziello	All
UnionBike GiMotorsport	Yamaha	Yamaha YZF-R1	9	(Italy) Ciro Ranieri	1–6
UnionBike GiMotorsport	Yamaha	Yamaha YZF-R1	97	(Italy) Giovanni Scillieri	7–9
Zone Rouge	Yamaha	Yamaha YZF-R1	20	(Belgium) Geoffrey Naze	1, 4–9

Key
Regular rider
Wildcard rider
Replacement rider

- All entries used Pirelli tyres.

== Championship' standings ==
=== Riders' standings ===
Pos	Rider	Bike	VAL (Spain)	MNZ (Italy)	OSC (Germany)	SIL (United Kingdom)	MIS (San Marino)	BRA (Europe)	ASS (Netherlands)	IMO (Italy)	MAG (France)	Pts
1	(Italy) Michel Fabrizio	Suzuki	17	1^{F}	Ret	1	1	3^{P}	5	1^{PF}	4^{P}	140
2	(Italy) Lorenzo Lanzi	Ducati	1^{F}	3	1^{F}	Ret^{PF}	3^{F}	11	1^{PF}	16	1^{F}	137
3	(United Kingdom) James Ellison	Suzuki		6	6	5	10	1^{F}	2	6	2	112
4	(Italy) Lorenzo Alfonsi	Yamaha	3^{P}	4	3	3	4	10	4	Ret	11	98
5	(Italy) Riccardo Chiarello	Ducati	5	7	5	8	2	17	11	2	5	95
6	(Italy) Gianluca Vizziello	Yamaha	12	Ret	2	2	Ret	5	3	8	Ret	79
7	(Italy) Ilario Dionisi	Suzuki	4	2^{P}	Ret	9	5^{P}	8	6	19	7	78
8	(Spain) Enrique Rocamora	Suzuki	2	5	Ret	DNS	9	12	10	5	3	75
9	(Spain) Bernat Martinez	Suzuki	8	Ret	7	4	6	15	8	4	6	72
10	(San Marino) William De Angelis	Ducati	13	9	10	7	7	16	9	7	Ret	50
11	(Spain) Alex Martinez	Suzuki	6	8	4	Ret	Ret	4	Ret	11	Ret	49
12	(Italy) Alessio Velini	Yamaha	10	12	Ret	12	8	20	13	9	8	40
13	(United Kingdom) Luke Quigley	Suzuki				10		2	7			35
14	(Republic of Ireland) John Laverty	Suzuki	14	Ret	WD	19	18	9	14	3	10	33
15	(France) Pierrot Vanstaen	Suzuki	16	13	8	13	16	13	17	10	9	30
16	(Spain) Jose Manuel Hurtado	Suzuki	9	10	9	Ret	Ret	21	15	Ret	16	21
17	(United Kingdom) Ben Wilson	Suzuki				11		6				15
18	(Italy) Massimo Bisconti	Yamaha	11	11	11	Ret		Ret	23	18	22	15
19	(Italy) Alessandro Brannetti	Aprilia		15	15	14	13	18	12	Ret	18	11
20	(United Kingdom) Steve Brogan	Suzuki				6						10
21	(Republic of Ireland) Michael Laverty	Suzuki	7									9
22	(United Kingdom) Ben Wylie	Suzuki				20		7				9
23	(Italy) Giacomo Romanelli	Suzuki	15	Ret	DNS	15	11	19	20	Ret	Ret	7
24	(Italy) Ayrton Badovini	Ducati	Ret	Ret	16	Ret	Ret	Ret	18	13	12	7
25	(Italy) Maurizio Bottalico	Suzuki	22	14	13	17	14					7
26	(Italy) Alessandro Buzzi	Suzuki					12					4
27	(Italy) Enriqo Pasini	Suzuki								12		4
28	(Italy) Christian Dal Corso	Ducati	20	Ret	12	18	17	Ret	25	22	Ret	4
29	(Australia) Damian Cudlin	Ducati									13	3
30	(United Kingdom) Kelvin Reilly	Suzuki						14				2
31	(France) Guillaume Dietrich	Suzuki									14	2
32	(Belgium) Nicolas Saelens	Honda	19	18	14	21	19		Ret	17	25	2
33	(Italy) Giovanni Scillieri	Yamaha							24	14	20	2
34	(Italy) Fabrizio De Marco	Yamaha					15					1
35	(Czech Republic) Matěj Smrž	Honda	21	Ret	18	WD	Ret	23	19	Ret	15	1
36	(Italy) Marco Tonini	Aprilia		20			22			15		1
	(Italy) Ciro Ranieri	Yamaha	18	16	21	16	Ret	22				0
	(Netherlands) Ghisbert Van Ginhoven	Ducati							16	WD		0
	(Italy) Dario Tosolini	Aprilia		17								0
	(France) David Fouloi	Suzuki									17	0
	(Czech Republic) Tomáš Mikšovský	Honda	Ret	19	17	22	WD	24	22	21	24	0
	(France) Denis Bouan	Suzuki									19	0
	(Belgium) Raphael De Saver	Suzuki	25	Ret	19	24	26	28	26		26	0
	(Germany) Max Weymann	Suzuki			20							0
	(Spain) Jose Lombardo	Suzuki	23	21		26	21	27	28	20	23	0
	(Belgium) Gerry Gepts	Suzuki	26	Ret	DNQ	23	20	DNQ	WD	WD		0
	(Netherlands) Robert De Vries	Suzuki							21			0
	(Italy) Fabrizio De Noni	Suzuki		22			Ret		Ret	Ret	21	0
	(Belgium) Tom Van Looy	Suzuki	DNQ	DNQ	22	DNQ	27	DNQ	29	DNQ	DNQ	0
	(Germany) Stefan Kittel	Suzuki			23							0
	(Belgium) Geoffrey Naze	Yamaha	24			DNQ	24	26	Ret	23	Ret	0
	(United Kingdom) David Gatenby	Suzuki	DNQ	DNQ	DNQ	25	23	25	27	DNS	Ret	0
	(Belgium) Leroy Verboven	Suzuki	Ret	DNQ	DNQ	27	25	29	DNQ	24	27	0
	(Netherlands) Rafael Sinke	Suzuki							Ret			0
	(Germany) Stefan Nebel	Suzuki			DSQ^{P}							0
Pos	Rider	Bike	VAL (Spain)	MNZ (Italy)	OSC (Germany)	SIL (United Kingdom)	MIS (San Marino)	BRA (Europe)	ASS (Netherlands)	IMO (Italy)	MAG (France)	Pts

Colour	Result
Gold	Winner
Silver	Second place
Bronze	Third place
Green	Points classification
Blue	Non-points classification
Blue	Non-classified finish (NC)
Purple	Retired, not classified (Ret)
Red	Did not qualify (DNQ)
Red	Did not pre-qualify (DNPQ)
Black	Disqualified (DSQ)
White	Did not start (DNS)
White	Withdrew (WD)
White	Race cancelled (C)
Blank	Did not practice (DNP)
Blank	Did not arrive (DNA)
Blank	Excluded (EX)

P – Pole position
F – Fastest lap
Source :
