= Michel Fabrizio =

Italian motorcycle racer

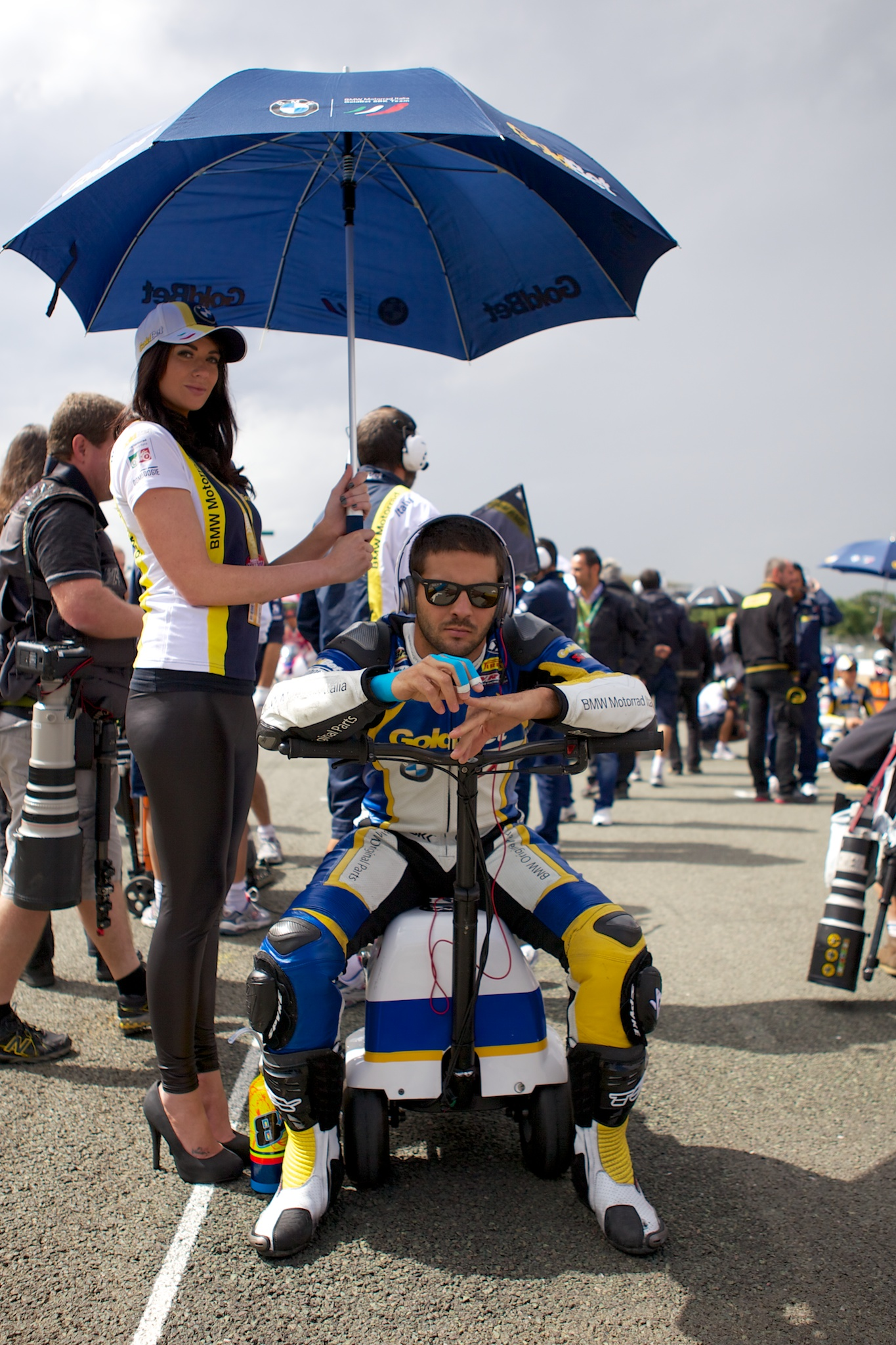
- Fabrizio at the Silverstone round of the 2012 Superbike World Championship
- Nationality: Italian
- Born: 17 September 1984 (age 42); Frascati, Italy
- Current team: G.A.P. Motozoo Racing by Puccetti
- Bike number: 84
Motorcycle racing career statistics
MotoGP World Championship
Active years	2004, 2006–2007, 2009, 2014
Manufacturers	Harris WCM, Aprilia, Honda, Ducati, ART
Championships	0
2014 championship position	NC (0 pts)
Starts / Wins / Podiums / Poles / F. laps / Points; 14 / 0 / 0 / 0 / 0 / 14
125cc World Championship
Active years	2002
Manufacturers	Gilera
Championships	0
2002 championship position	31st (4 pts)
Starts / Wins / Podiums / Poles / F. laps / Points; 16 / 0 / 0 / 0 / 0 / 4
Superbike World Championship
Active years	2006–2015
Manufacturers	Honda, Ducati, Suzuki, BMW, Aprilia, Kawasaki
Championships	0
2015 championship position	25th (13 pts)
Starts / Wins / Podiums / Poles / F. laps / Points; 218 / 4 / 35 / 1 / 11 / 1549.5
Supersport World Championship
Active years	2004–2005, 2021
Manufacturers	Honda, Kawasaki
Championships	0
2021 championship position	37th (6 pts)
Starts / Wins / Podiums / Poles / F. laps / Points; 29 / 0 / 5 / 1 / 3 / 153

Michel Fabrizio (born 17 September 1984) is a former professional motorcycle road racer. From 2006 to 2015, he raced in the Superbike World Championship.

In 2021, Fabrizio competed in the Supersport World Championship aboard a Kawasaki ZX-6R, before retiring on September 26 from motorsport as a sign of protest after Dean Berta Viñales' fatal crash in Jerez.

== Career ==
=== Personal life and early career ===
Born in Frascati, near Rome, Fabrizio first raced in Minimoto at the age of six, winning several titles before reaching his teens. He won the Aprilia Challenge in 2001, and raced in the 125 cc World Championship for Gilera in 2002, with little success.

Fabrizio won the 2003 European Superstock championship aboard a Suzuki GSXR 1000.

=== MotoGP and World Supersport ===
In 2004, Fabrizio made his first appearance in MotoGP, with the Harris WCM team. Despite his lack of experience and riding with inferior equipment compared to his racing rivals, Fabrizio managed to impress the paddock with several point scoring finishes and by consistently outpacing his teammate, Chris Burns. His most notable result came in the wet at Jerez, where he scored 10th place despite a small crash during the race. Further points scoring finishes occurred in Italy and Germany.

During the Dutch grand prix at Assen, Fabrizio fractured his ankle in a spectacular crash, forcing him to miss the next round in Brazil. He was replaced by 2003 Harris WCM rider David De Gea. For the Portuguese round in Estoril, Fabrizio was presented with an opportunity to ride for Italian manufacturer Aprilia on the RS Cube. Regular rider Shane Byrne was suffering from a broken wrist, leading Aprilia to fly both Fabrizio and Anthony West out to Mugello to test the bike alongside Jeremy McWilliams. After impressing the team during the test, Fabrizio was selected to replace Byrne at Estoril. In turn, Fabrizio was replaced by British rider James Ellison for the race.

Realizing his dream of riding for a factory team ended up becoming an unravelling for Fabrizio, as he suffered a violent headshake from the much-maligned RS Cube during the first lap of the race. Despite continuing for 11 laps, the pain became too much and forced Fabrizio to retire from the race. Luckily, no serious injury was suffered, but this proved to not be the end of Fabrizio's problems during the year.

With expectations to return to the Harris WCM team for the next round at Motegi in Japan, Fabrizio suddenly found himself without a ride, being replaced by 125cc rider Youichi Ui. With no options left, Fabrizio retired from the MotoGP season, finishing a disappointing 22nd.

To end his 2004 season, Fabrizio took a ride with Team Italia Megabike in the Supersport World Championship, competing in the final two rounds of the series. In his first appearance, at his home track of Imola, Fabrizio took an impressive seventh place. At the series finale in France, he gained further notoriety after qualifying second in only his second World Supersport appearance. He failed to finish the race, but had done enough to prove himself.

In 2005, Fabrizio raced his first full season in the Supersport World Championship, on a factory Honda. He was fifth overall, with nine top-five results in the 12 races, although without a win.

=== Superbike World Championship ===
For 2006, Fabrizio was teamed with the veteran Pierfrancesco Chili on privateer Honda machinery. He started his career with fifth and eighth at Qatar. He stood in for Toni Elías on MotoGP Fortuna Honda at Donington Park, but crashed in practice and broke his collarbone. He replaced the injured Elías again for the same team in the 2007 German Grand Prix at Sachsenring on July 15, 2007.

At Brno in the 2006 Superbike World Championship, Fabrizio started tenth, but chose hard-compound tyres, which remained on the pace as other riders faded. In the first race he passed a fading Andrew Pitt as well as Fonsi Nieto, Troy Corser and Noriyuki Haga in the closing laps to score his first Superbike World Championship podium finish. In race two, he fared even better - after passing James Toseland for fourth towards the end, he caught the battle for second between Haga and Corser. As Corser attempted a move, Fabrizio dived down the inside of both, slithering and nearly hitting Haga, before edging ahead of them both to the line, immediately improving on his career-best result with a second. His best results of 2007 were two third places, at Assen and Brno. In both seasons, he was 11th overall.

In 2008, Fabrizio raced alongside Troy Bayliss for Ducati Xerox Team on the new Ducati 1098. He came third in race one at Philip Island, Australia, despite a huge crash at the original start. At Miller Motorsports Park, he qualified on the front row and took a pair of third places, despite dropping to 11th on lap one of the first race. He had a double-DNF at Assen, shortly before an arm operation, and finished a career-best 8th overall.

For 2009, Fabrizio stayed on at Ducati Xerox, partnering Noriyuki Haga after Bayliss' retirement. His first WSBK win (in his 94th start) came at Monza after Ben Spies ran out of fuel. Seven successive podiums followed, cementing his third place in the standings behind Haga and Spies. This run ended at Brno when he took Spies down as they battled for the lead. He finished the season third overall.

Fabrizio and Haga both continued with the team for 2010. The bike dominated pre-season testing at Phillip Island.

After Ducati announced that they would be ending support for their World Superbike operations at the end of the 2010 season, Fabrizio agreed a contract with Team Suzuki Alstare to race in the 2011 Superbike World Championship season.

=== MotoGP World Championship ===
In August 2009, after Casey Stoner announced his intention to withdraw from the next three Grand Prix, it was announced that his place in the Ducati Marlboro team would be taken by Mika Kallio whilst the Finn's place at Pramac Racing would be taken by Fabrizio. His race was marred by physical difficulties, which caused him to retire from the first race in Brno. Fabrizio then being unavailable for the next race in Indianapolis the ride was given to Aleix Espargaró for the remaining two races.

=== CIV Superbike Championship ===
Fabrizio took part in the CIV championship as wildcard entries at Mugello in 2021.

== Career statistics ==
=== Career highlights ===
- 2003 - 1st, Superstock European Championship, Suzuki GSX-R1000
- 2021 : G.A.P. MotoZoo Racing by Puccetti Kawasaki (CIV Supersport 600) #84

=== Career summary ===
Season	Series	Team	Races	Poles	Wins	Points	Position
2002	125cc	Team Italia Gilera	16	0	0	4	31st
2003	European Stock 1000	Team Alstare Corona	9	3	4	152	**1st**
2004	MotoGP	WCM	10	0	0	8	22nd
2004	MotoGP	MS Aprilia Racing	10	0	0	8	22nd
2004	World Supersport	Italia Megabike	2	0	0	9	27th
2005	World Supersport	Team Megabike	12	1	0	138	5th
2006	World Superbike	D.F.X. Treme	24	0	0	125	11th
2007	World Superbike	D.F.X. Corse	25	0	0	132	11th
2007	MotoGP	Honda Gresini	1	0	0	6	21st
2008	World Superbike	Ducati Xerox	28	0	0	223	8th
2009	World Superbike	Ducati Xerox	28	1	3	382	**3rd**
2009	MotoGP	Pramac Racing	1	0	0	0	20th
2010	World Superbike	Ducati Xerox	26	0	1	195	8th
2011	World Superbike	Alstare Suzuki	26	0	0	152	12th
2012	World Superbike	BMW Motorrad Italia	26	0	0	137.5	11th
2013	World Superbike	Red Devils Roma	27	0	0	188	7th
2013	World Superbike	Pata Honda World Superbike	27	0	0	188	7th
2014	World Superbike	Iron Brain Grillini Kawasaki	6	0	0	2	32nd
2014	MotoGP	Octo IodaRacing Team	2	0	0	0	NC
2015	World Superbike	Althea Racing	2	0	0	13	25th

=== CIV 125cc Championship ===
==== Races by year ====
(key) (Races in bold indicate pole position; races in italics indicate fastest lap)

Year	Bike	1	2	3	4	5	Pos	Pts
2001	Aprilia	MIS1	MON	VAL; Ret	MIS2; 10	MIS3; 9	16th	13

=== Grand Prix motorcycle racing ===
==== Races by year ====
(key) (Races in bold indicate pole position, races in italics indicate fastest lap)

Year	Class	Bike	1	2	3	4	5	6	7	8	9	10	11	12	13	14	15	16	17	18	Pos	Pts
2002	125cc	Gilera	JPN; Ret	RSA; 15	SPA; 18	FRA; 17	ITA; 16	CAT; Ret	NED; Ret	GBR; Ret	GER; 23	CZE; 25	POR; Ret	BRA; 23	PAC; 13	MAL; 26	AUS; Ret	VAL; 20			31st	4
2004	MotoGP	Harris WCM	RSA; 18	SPA; 10	FRA; 16	ITA; 15	CAT; 16	NED; Ret	BRA	GER; 15	GBR; 20	CZE; 17									22nd	8
2004	MotoGP	Aprilia											POR; Ret	JPN	QAT	MAL	AUS	VAL			22nd	8
2006	MotoGP	Honda	SPA	QAT	TUR	CHN	FRA	ITA	CAT	NED	GBR; WD	GER	USA	CZE	MAL	AUS	JPN	POR	VAL		NC	0
2007	MotoGP	Honda	QAT	ESP	TUR	CHN	FRA	ITA	CAT	GBR	NED	GER; 10	USA	CZE	RSM	POR	JPN	AUS	MAL	VAL	21st	6
2009	MotoGP	Ducati	QAT	JPN	SPA	FRA	ITA	CAT	NED	USA	GER	GBR	CZE; Ret	INP	RSM	POR	AUS	MAL	VAL		NC	0
2014	MotoGP	ART	QAT	AME	ARG	SPA	FRA	ITA; Ret	CAT; 20	NED	GER	INP	CZE	GBR	RSM	ARA	JPN	AUS	MAL	VAL	NC	0

=== Superstock European Championship ===
==== Races by year ====
(key) (Races in bold indicate pole position) (Races in italics indicate fastest lap)

Year	Bike	1	2	3	4	5	6	7	8	9	Pos	Pts
2003	Suzuki	VAL; 17	MNZ; 1	OSC; Ret	SIL; 1	SMR; 1	BRA; 3	NED; 5	IMO; 1	MAG; 4	1st	140

=== Supersport World Championship ===
==== Races by year ====
(key) (Races in bold indicate pole position, races in italics indicate fastest lap)

Year	Bike	1	2	3	4	5	6	7	8	9	10	11	12	13	14	15	16	17	18	19	20	21	22	23	24	Pos	Pts
2004	Honda	SPA	AUS	SMR	ITA	GER	GBR	GBR	NED	ITA; 7	FRA; Ret															27th	9
2005	Honda	QAT; 3	AUS; Ret	SPA; 4	ITA; 4	EUR; Ret	SMR; Ret	CZE; 2	GBR; 2	NED; 3	GER; 5	ITA; 4	**FRA**; 3													5th	138
2021	Kawasaki	SPA; 14	SPA; 21	POR; 16	POR; Ret	ITA; Ret	ITA; Ret	NED; 13	NED; 15	CZE; 22	CZE; Ret	SPA; Ret	SPA; 20	FRA; Ret	FRA; DNS	SPA; 21	SPA; 21	SPA; C	SPA; DNS	POR	POR	ARG	ARG	INA	INA	37th	6

=== Superbike World Championship ===
==== Races by year ====
(key) (Races in bold indicate pole position, races in italics indicate fastest lap)

Year	Bike	1		2		3		4		5		6		7		8		9		10		11		12		13		14		Pos	Pts
Year	Bike	R1	R2	R1	R2	R1	R2	R1	R2	R1	R2	R1	R2	R1	R2	R1	R2	R1	R2	R1	R2	R1	R2	R1	R2	R1	R2	R1	R2	Pos	Pts
2006	Honda	QAT; 5	QAT; 8	AUS; 15	AUS; 11	SPA; 13	SPA; 10	ITA; Ret	ITA; 14	EUR; Ret	EUR; 15	SMR; Ret	SMR; 6	CZE; 3	CZE; 2	GBR; Ret	GBR; 12	NED; 3	NED; 10	GER; Ret	GER; 8	ITA; Ret	ITA; Ret	FRA; 11	FRA; 13					11th	125
2007	Honda	QAT; Ret	QAT; 12	AUS; Ret	AUS; 9	EUR; 13	EUR; 12	SPA; 7	SPA; 11	NED; 12	NED; 6	ITA; 8	ITA; 11	GBR; Ret	GBR; C	SMR; Ret	SMR; Ret	CZE; 6	CZE; 3	GBR; 5	GBR; 4	GER; Ret	GER; 13	ITA; 5	ITA; Ret	FRA; 14	FRA; 9			11th	132
2008	Ducati	QAT; 9	QAT; 5	AUS; 3	AUS; 19	SPA; Ret	SPA; 13	NED; Ret	NED; Ret	ITA; 9	ITA; 5	USA; 3	USA; 3	GER; 7	GER; 6	SMR; Ret	SMR; 11	CZE; 3	CZE; 2	GBR; 12	GBR; 6	EUR; Ret	EUR; 5	ITA; 7	ITA; 2	FRA; Ret	FRA; 14	POR; Ret	POR; 2	8th	223
2009	Ducati	AUS; 4	AUS; 5	QAT; Ret	QAT; Ret	SPA; 2	SPA; 3	NED; 9	NED; 4	ITA; 1	ITA; 2	RSA; 2	RSA; 2	USA; 3	USA; 2	SMR; 3	SMR; 2	GBR; 12	GBR; 3	CZE; Ret	CZE; 3	GER; 7	GER; 9	**ITA**; 3	**ITA**; 1	FRA; 4	FRA; 13	POR; 5	POR; 1	**3rd**	**382**
2010	Ducati	AUS; 2	AUS; 3	POR; 11	POR; 11	SPA; Ret	SPA; Ret	NED; 13	NED; 12	ITA; 7	ITA; Ret	RSA; 1	RSA; 8	USA; Ret	USA; 9	SMR; 4	SMR; 3	CZE; Ret	CZE; 3	GBR; 4	GBR; Ret	GER; Ret	GER; 19	ITA; 7	ITA; Ret	FRA; 6	FRA; 3			8th	195
2011	Suzuki	AUS; 6	AUS; 8	EUR; Ret	EUR; 7	NED; 5	NED; 7	ITA; 5	ITA; 3	USA; Ret	USA; 5	SMR; Ret	SMR; 6	SPA; Ret	SPA; 4	CZE; 4	CZE; 4	GBR; Ret	GBR; 9	GER; 16	GER; Ret	ITA; Ret	ITA; Ret	FRA; 12	FRA; Ret	POR; 11	POR; 14			12th	152
2012	BMW	AUS; 6	AUS; Ret	ITA; Ret	ITA; Ret	NED; 6	NED; 10	ITA; C	ITA; DNS	EUR; 10	EUR; 13	USA; 9	USA; 12	SMR; 14	SMR; 6	SPA; 6	SPA; 11	CZE; 8	CZE; 10	GBR; 2	GBR; 13	RUS; 5	RUS; Ret	GER; Ret	GER; Ret	POR; 10	POR; 8	FRA; 12	FRA; Ret	11th	137.5
2013	Aprilia	AUS; 3	AUS; 4	SPA; 8	SPA; 11	NED; 12	NED; 9	ITA; 6	ITA; 5	GBR; 10	GBR; 10	POR; 7	POR; 10	ITA; 5	ITA; 8	RUS; 5	RUS; C	GBR; 14	GBR; 11	GER; 6	GER; 8									7th	188
2013	Honda																					TUR; 10	TUR; 10	USA; 13	USA; 10	FRA; 7	FRA; Ret	SPA; 17	SPA; 14	7th	188
2014	Kawasaki	AUS; WD	AUS; WD	SPA; Ret	SPA; Ret	NED; Ret	NED; 14	ITA; Ret	ITA; Ret	GBR	GBR	MAL	MAL	SMR	SMR	POR	POR	USA	USA	SPA	SPA	FRA	FRA	QAT	QAT					32nd	2
2015	Ducati	AUS	AUS	THA	THA	SPA	SPA	NED	NED	ITA; 10	ITA; 9	GBR	GBR	POR	POR	SMR	SMR	USA	USA	MAL	MAL	SPA	SPA	FRA	FRA	QAT	QAT			25th	13
