= 2004 Supersport World Championship =

2004 Supersport World Championship
Previous:	2003	Next:	2005
Support series: Superbike World Championship; Superstock European Championship

The 2004 Supersport World Championship was the sixth FIM Supersport World Championship season—the eight taking into account the two held under the name of Supersport World Series. The season started on 29 February at Valencia and finished on 3 October at Magny-Cours after 10 races.

The riders' championship was won by Karl Muggeridge and the manufacturers' championship was won by Honda. Karl Muggeridge won a total of 7 races, a new record for the class.

== Race calendar and results ==
2004 calendar
Round	Date	Round	Circuit	Pole position	Fastest lap	Winner	Report
1	29 February	Spain	Valencia	(Australia) Karl Muggeridge	(Australia) Broc Parkes	(Netherlands) Jurgen van den Goorbergh	Report
2	28 March	Australia	Phillip Island	(Australia) Karl Muggeridge	(Netherlands) Jurgen van den Goorbergh	(Australia) Josh Brookes	Report
3	18 April	San Marino	Misano	(France) Sébastien Charpentier	(Australia) Broc Parkes	(Australia) Karl Muggeridge	Report
4	16 May	Italy	Monza	(Australia) Karl Muggeridge	(Australia) Karl Muggeridge	(Australia) Karl Muggeridge	Report
5	30 May	Germany	Oschersleben	(Australia) Karl Muggeridge	(Australia) Broc Parkes	(Australia) Karl Muggeridge	Report
6	13 June	Great Britain	Silverstone	(Australia) Karl Muggeridge	(France) Sébastien Charpentier	(France) Fabien Foret	Report
7	1 August	Europe	Brands Hatch	(Australia) Karl Muggeridge	(France) Fabien Foret	(Australia) Karl Muggeridge	Report
8	5 September	Netherlands	Assen	(Australia) Karl Muggeridge	(Australia) Andrew Pitt	(Australia) Karl Muggeridge	Report
9	26 September	Italy	Imola	(Australia) Karl Muggeridge	(Australia) Karl Muggeridge	(Australia) Karl Muggeridge	Report
10	3 October	France	Magny-Cours	(Australia) Broc Parkes	(Australia) Broc Parkes	(Australia) Karl Muggeridge	Report

== Championship standings ==
=== Riders' standings ===
2004 final riders' standings
Pos.	Rider	Bike	ESP (Spain)	AUS (Australia)	SMR (San Marino)	ITA (Italy)	GER (Germany)	GBR (United Kingdom)	EUR (Europe)	NED (Netherlands)	ITA (Italy)	FRA (France)	Pts
1	(Australia) Karl Muggeridge	Honda	**8**	**12**	1	**1**	**1**	**2**	**1**	**1**	**1**	1	207
2	(Australia) Broc Parkes	Honda	Ret	4	Ret	2	2	3	4	4	2	**2**	135
3	(Netherlands) Jurgen van den Goorbergh	Yamaha	1	3	3	3	7	6	3	5	Ret	5	130
4	(France) Sébastien Charpentier	Honda	DSQ	5	**Ret**	4	3	8	2	2	3	3	120
5	(Italy) Lorenzo Lanzi	Ducati	4	9	6	15	10	4	10	20	4	4	82
6	(Australia) Kevin Curtain	Yamaha	9	2	2	Ret	Ret	5	5	Ret	Ret	Ret	69
7	(France) Fabien Foret	Yamaha	2	6	Ret	DSQ	Ret	1	Ret	Ret	5	Ret	66
8	(France) Stéphane Chambon	Suzuki	5	10	7	Ret	4	10	8	13	8	Ret	64
9	(Germany) Max Neukirchner	Honda	14	8	Ret	6	5	11	11	7	11	8	63
10	(Japan) Katsuaki Fujiwara	Suzuki	3	11	4	Ret	6	Ret	7	Ret	14	Ret	55
11	(Italy) Alessio Corradi	Honda	Ret	7	5	Ret	9	9	6	DNS			44
12	(Australia) Andrew Pitt	Yamaha								3	6	6	36
13	(Germany) Christian Kellner	Yamaha	Ret	Ret	Ret	5	8	Ret	Ret	9	15	13	30
14	(France) Matthieu Lagrive	Suzuki	11	15	13	9	16	15	15	14	19	9	27
15	(Australia) Josh Brookes	Honda		1									25
16	(Italy) Vittorio Iannuzzo	Suzuki	6	13	9	DSQ	Ret	Ret	Ret	Ret			20
17	(Italy) Matteo Baiocco	Yamaha	13	Ret	Ret	Ret	17	13	16	15	9	10	20
18	(Italy) Giovanni Bussei	Ducati	Ret	Ret	8	7	Ret	Ret					17
19	(Sweden) Jan Hanson	Honda				10				6			16
20	(Netherlands) Barry Veneman	Suzuki					11			10		12	15
21	(Italy) Massimo Roccoli	Yamaha			11	11						11	15
22	(Australia) Craig Coxhell	Yamaha									12	7	13
23	(Italy) Stefano Cruciani	Kawasaki	10	14	Ret	Ret	Ret	Ret	19	12	Ret		12
24	(Italy) Denis Sacchetti	Honda	Ret	17	14	12	13	16	18	17	13	Ret	12
25	(Belgium) Werner Daemen	Honda	7				14			Ret			11
26	(Norway) Kai Borre Andersen	Kawasaki	15				12			11			10
27	(Italy) Michel Fabrizio	Honda									7	Ret	9
28	(Spain) Pere Riba	Kawasaki						7					9
29	(Netherlands) Arie Vos	Kawasaki								8			8
30	(Italy) Vittoriano Guareschi	Ducati				8							8
31	(Italy) Walter Tortoroglio	Suzuki	Ret	16	10	Ret	18	Ret	14	DNS			8
31	(Italy) Walter Tortoroglio	Kawasaki										Ret	8
32	(Australia) Anthony West	Honda							9				7
33	(Italy) Alessandro Antonello	Kawasaki									10		6
34	(United Kingdom) Luke Quigley	Suzuki						Ret	12				4
35	(United Kingdom) Craig Jones	Triumph	Ret					12					4
36	(Italy) Antonio Carlacci	Yamaha			12								4
37	(Germany) Arne Tode	Yamaha	12				Ret	Ret					4
38	(United Kingdom) Tom Tunstall	Honda							13				3
39	(Italy) Diego Giugovaz	Honda				13							3
40	(Belgium) Sébastien Le Grelle	Honda	16				15	14	17	19	17	Ret	3
41	(Sweden) Jimmy Lindström	Honda									Ret	14	2
42	(Netherlands) Ron van Steenbergen	Honda				14				DNS			2
43	(France) Philippe Donischal	Suzuki									16	15	1
44	(Israel) Eli Chen	Honda	DNQ		15	DNQ		17	DNQ	DNQ	DNQ	DNQ	1
	(Netherlands) Jarno Janssen	Suzuki					Ret			Ret		16	0
	(United Kingdom) Iain MacPherson	Honda					Ret						0
	(United Kingdom) Iain MacPherson	Ducati								16	Ret		0
	(United States) Nicky Wimbauer	Yamaha			16	Ret					Ret		0
	(France) Yann Lussiana	Yamaha										17	0
	(Italy) Andrea Berta	Honda				Ret				Ret	18		0
	(Switzerland) Roman Stamm	Suzuki					Ret			18			0
	(Spain) Roberto Pandilla	Kawasaki										18	0
	(Israel) Yaniv Peleg	Honda		18									0
	(United Kingdom) Dean Ellison	Honda					19	Ret	Ret				0
	(Norway) Tage Solberg	Yamaha										19	0
	(Spain) Iván Silva	Honda								Ret		Ret	0
	(France) Yoann Tiberio	Yamaha							Ret			Ret	0
	(Germany) Tobias Kirmeier	Honda	Ret							Ret			0
	(United Kingdom) Steve Brogan	Honda		Ret	Ret								0
	(Italy) Alessandro Melone	Suzuki									Ret	DNS	0
	(Switzerland) Hervé Gantner	Honda										Ret	0
	(Netherlands) Jeroen Turkstra	Honda								Ret			0
	(United Kingdom) Luke Quigley	Suzuki						Ret					0
	(Japan) Tekkyu Kayoh	Yamaha					Ret						0
	(Germany) Jesco Günther	Honda					Ret						0
	(Italy) Cristiano Migliorati	Kawasaki				Ret							0
	(Italy) Gilles Boccolini	Honda				Ret							0
	(Italy) Maurizio Tumminello	Yamaha			Ret								0
	(Australia) Mark Stanley	Yamaha		Ret									0
	(Spain) Javier Forés	Suzuki	Ret										0
	(Spain) Víctor Carrasco	Honda	Ret										0
	(France) David Muscat	Ducati										DNS	0
	(Australia) Brendan Clarke	Yamaha		DNS									0
	(Israel) Sahar Zvik	Honda				DNQ	DNQ						0
	(Israel) Yaron Salinger	Honda	DNQ										0
Pos.	Rider	Bike	ESP (Spain)	AUS (Australia)	SMR (San Marino)	ITA (Italy)	GER (Germany)	GBR (United Kingdom)	EUR (Europe)	NED (Netherlands)	ITA (Italy)	FRA (France)	Pts

Colour	Result
Gold	Winner
Silver	Second place
Bronze	Third place
Green	Points classification
Blue	Non-points classification
Blue	Non-classified finish (NC)
Purple	Retired, not classified (Ret)
Red	Did not qualify (DNQ)
Red	Did not pre-qualify (DNPQ)
Black	Disqualified (DSQ)
White	Did not start (DNS)
White	Withdrew (WD)
White	Race cancelled (C)
Blank	Did not practice (DNP)
Blank	Did not arrive (DNA)
Blank	Excluded (EX)

**Bold** – Pole position
Italics – Fastest lap

=== Manufacturers' standings ===
2004 final manufacturers' standings
Pos.	Manufacturer	ESP (Spain)	AUS (Australia)	SMR (San Marino)	ITA (Italy)	GER (Germany)	GBR (United Kingdom)	EUR (Europe)	NED (Netherlands)	ITA (Italy)	FRA (France)	Pts
1	(Japan) Honda	7	1	1	1	8 (1)	2	1	1	1	1	212
2	(Japan) Yamaha	1	2	2	3	3 (7)	1	3	3	5	5	176
3	(Japan) Suzuki	3	10	4	9	1 (4)	10	7	10	8	9	103
4	(Italy) Ducati	4	9	6	7	5 (10)	4	10	16	4	4	95
5	(Japan) Kawasaki	10	14	Ret	Ret	7 (12)	7	19	8	10	18	40
6	(United Kingdom) Triumph	Ret					12					4
Pos.	Manufacturer	ESP (Spain)	AUS (Australia)	SMR (San Marino)	ITA (Italy)	GER (Germany)	GBR (United Kingdom)	EUR (Europe)	NED (Netherlands)	ITA (Italy)	FRA (France)	Pts

- The top six Honda riders were disqualified from the Oschersleben race results after discrepancies were found in the homologation weight of the rear wheel spindle. The Honda factory informed the FIM that an error was made when filling in the homologation documents. The FIM verified Honda's claim and decided to revoke the decision for the riders. However the points were withdrawn from Honda in the manufacturers' championship.

== Entry list ==
2004 entry list
Team	Constructor	Motorcycle	No.	Rider	Rounds
Suzuki Alstare Corona Extra	Suzuki	Suzuki GSX 600R	2	(France) Stéphane Chambon	All
Suzuki Alstare Corona Extra	Suzuki	Suzuki GSX 600R	20	(Italy) Vittorio Iannuzzo	1–8
Suzuki Alstare Corona Extra	Suzuki	Suzuki GSX 600R	37	(Japan) Katsuaki Fujiwara	All
Yamaha Italia	Yamaha	Yamaha YZF-R6	4	(Netherlands) Jurgen van den Goorbergh	All
Yamaha Italia	Yamaha	Yamaha YZF-R6	9	(Japan) Tekkyu Kayoh	5
Yamaha Italia	Yamaha	Yamaha YZF-R6	88	(Australia) Andrew Pitt	8–10
Yamaha Italia	Yamaha	Yamaha YZF-R6	99	(France) Fabien Foret	All
Italia Megabike	Honda	Honda CBR600RR	8	(Italy) Alessio Corradi	1–8
Italia Megabike	Honda	Honda CBR600RR	14	(Australia) Anthony West	7
Italia Megabike	Honda	Honda CBR600RR	18	(Italy) Denis Sacchetti	All
Italia Megabike	Honda	Honda CBR600RR	35	(Italy) Gilles Boccolini	4
Italia Megabike	Honda	Honda CBR600RR	84	(Italy) Michel Fabrizio	9–10
Kawasaki Docshop Racing	Kawasaki	Kawasaki ZX-6RR	10	(Norway) Kai Borre Andersen	1, 5, 8
Yamaha Motor Deutschland	Yamaha	Yamaha YZF-R6	11	(Australia) Kevin Curtain	All
Yamaha Motor Deutschland	Yamaha	Yamaha YZF-R6	33	(Australia) Craig Coxhell	9–10
Yamaha Motor Deutschland	Yamaha	Yamaha YZF-R6	93	(Germany) Christian Kellner	All
Mega Bike	Suzuki	Suzuki GSX 600R	12	(Spain) Javier Forés	1
Lorenzini by Leoni	Yamaha	Yamaha YZF-R6	15	(Italy) Matteo Baiocco	All
Lorenzini by Leoni	Yamaha	Yamaha YZF-R6	55	(Italy) Massimo Roccoli	10
Klaffi Honda	Honda	Honda CBR600RR	16	(France) Sébastien Charpentier	All
Klaffi Honda	Honda	Honda CBR600RR	61	(Switzerland) Hervé Gantner	10
Klaffi Honda	Honda	Honda CBR600RR	69	(Sweden) Jimmy Lindström	9–10
Klaffi Honda	Honda	Honda CBR600RR	76	(Germany) Max Neukirchner	All
Alpha Technik - Van Zon	Honda	Honda CBR600RR	17	(Germany) Tobias Kirmeier	1, 8
Alpha Technik - Van Zon	Honda	Honda CBR600RR	44	(United Kingdom) Iain MacPherson	5
Alpha Technik - Van Zon	Honda	Honda CBR600RR	71	(Belgium) Werner Daemen	1, 5, 8
Celani - Suzuki Italia	Suzuki	Suzuki GSX 600R	19	(Italy) Walter Tortoroglio	1–8
Celani - Suzuki Italia	Suzuki	Suzuki GSX 600R	90	(Italy) Alessandro Melone	9–10
Kawasaki Bertocchi	Kawasaki	Kawasaki ZX-6RR	19	(Italy) Walter Tortoroglio	10
Kawasaki Bertocchi	Kawasaki	Kawasaki ZX-6RR	22	(Italy) Stefano Cruciani	1–9
Kawasaki Bertocchi	Kawasaki	Kawasaki ZX-6RR	30	(Italy) Alessandro Antonello	9
Ducati Breil	Ducati	Ducati 749 R	21	(Italy) Vittoriano Guareschi	4
Ducati Breil	Ducati	Ducati 749 R	57	(Italy) Lorenzo Lanzi	All
Ten Kate Honda	Honda	Honda CBR600RR	23	(Australia) Broc Parkes	All
Ten Kate Honda	Honda	Honda CBR600RR	31	(Australia) Karl Muggeridge	All
Moto 1	Suzuki	Suzuki GSX 600R	24	(France) Matthieu Lagrive	All
Moto 1	Suzuki	Suzuki GSX 600R	82	(France) Philippe Donischal	9–10
SL Racing	Ducati	Ducati 749 R	25	(Italy) Giovanni Bussei	1–6
SL Racing	Ducati	Ducati 749 R	44	(United Kingdom) Iain MacPherson	8–9
SL Racing	Ducati	Ducati 749 R	87	(France) David Muscat	10
Kawasaki Pro Racing Osasuma	Kawasaki	Kawasaki ZX-6RR	26	(Spain) Roberto Pandilla	10
Lightspeed	Kawasaki	Kawasaki ZX-6RR	27	(Italy) Cristiano Migliorati	4
Start Team	Yamaha	Yamaha YZF-R6	38	(Italy) Antonio Carlacci	3
Team Trasimeno	Yamaha	Yamaha YZF-R6	39	(United States) Nicky Wimbauer	3–4, 9
Rine Racing Team	Yamaha	Yamaha YZF-R6	40	(Italy) Maurizio Tumminello	3
Velox Team	Honda	Honda CBR600RR	41	(Italy) Diego Giugovaz	4
Biassono Racing Team	Honda	Honda CBR600RR	43	(Italy) Andrea Berta	4, 8–9
LeGrelle Dholda Moto P.	Honda	Honda CBR600RR	45	(Belgium) Sébastien Le Grelle	1, 5–10
Team Suzuki Nederland	Suzuki	Suzuki GSX 600R	46	(Netherlands) Barry Veneman	5, 8, 10
Team Suzuki Nederland	Suzuki	Suzuki GSX 600R	64	(Netherlands) Jarno Janssen	5, 8, 10
MSS Discovery	Kawasaki	Kawasaki ZX-6RR	48	(Spain) Pere Riba	6
Kobutex Honda	Honda	Honda CBR600RR	49	(Netherlands) Ron van Steenbergen	4, 8
Kobutex Honda	Honda	Honda CBR600RR	54	(Sweden) Jan Hanson	4, 8
IRT Honda Israel	Honda	Honda CBR600RR	50	(United Kingdom) Steve Brogan	2–3
IRT Honda Israel	Honda	Honda CBR600RR	56	(Israel) Sahar Zvik	4–5
IRT Honda Israel	Honda	Honda CBR600RR	70	(Israel) Yaniv Peleg	2
IRT Honda Israel	Honda	Honda CBR600RR	91	(Spain) Iván Silva	8, 10
IRT Honda Israel	Honda	Honda CBR600RR	94	(Israel) Yaron Salinger	1
IRT Honda Israel	Honda	Honda CBR600RR	95	(Israel) Eli Chen	1, 3–4, 6–10
IRT Honda Israel	Honda	Honda CBR600RR	96	(United Kingdom) Dean Ellison	5–7
Suzuki Swiss	Suzuki	Suzuki GSX 600R	51	(Switzerland) Roman Stamm	5, 8
Pajic-Kawasak	Kawasaki	Kawasaki ZX-6RR	52	(Netherlands) Arie Vos	8
Koerhuls - RRTH	Honda	Honda CBR600RR	53	(Netherlands) Jeroen Turkstra	8
Bike Service	Yamaha	Yamaha YZF-R6	55	(Italy) Massimo Roccoli	3–4
Ecko Racing Team	Yamaha	Yamaha YZF-R6	72	(Germany) Arne Tode	1, 5–6
Alphar Technik	Honda	Honda CBR600RR	73	(Germany) Jesco Günther	5
Nikon Yamaha Racing	Yamaha	Yamaha YZF-R6	74	(Australia) Brendan Clarke	2
Castrol Honda Racing	Honda	Honda CBR600RR	75	(Australia) Josh Brookes	2
MSR Liscycles.com	Yamaha	Yamaha YZF-R6	77	(Australia) Mark Stanley	2
Buildbase Knotts Racing	Suzuki	Suzuki GSX 600R	78	(United Kingdom) Luke Quigley	6–7
Vitrans / Hardinge M.T	Honda	Honda CBR600RR	79	(United Kingdom) Tom Tunstall	7
Aspi Lussiana	Yamaha	Yamaha YZF-R6	80	(France) Yann Lussiana	10
Valmoto Triumph	Triumph	Triumph Daytona 600	81	(United Kingdom) Craig Jones	1, 6
Solberg Racing	Yamaha	Yamaha YZF-R6	85	(Norway) Tage Solberg	10
Monlau Repsol Honda	Honda	Honda CBR600RR	86	(Spain) Víctor Carrasco	1
Yamaha France	Yamaha	Yamaha YZF-R6	132	(France) Yoann Tiberio	7, 10

Key
Regular rider
Wildcard rider
Replacement rider
