= 2005 Supersport World Championship =

2005 Supersport World Championship
Previous:	2004	Next:	2006
Support series: Superbike World Championship; FIM Superstock 1000 Cup; European Superstock 600 Championship

The 2005 Supersport World Championship was the seventh FIM Supersport World Championship season—the tenth taking into account the two held under the name of Supersport World Series. The season started on 26 February at Losail and finished on 9 October at Magny-Cours after 12 races.

Sébastien Charpentier won the title after beating closest rival Kevin Curtain.

== Race calendar and results ==
2005 Calendar
Round	Date	Round	Circuit	Pole position	Fastest lap	Race winner	Winning team
1	26 February	Qatar	Losail	(France) Sébastien Charpentier	(France) Sébastien Charpentier	(Japan) Katsuaki Fujiwara	Winston Ten Kate Honda
2	3 April	Australia	Phillip Island	(France) Sébastien Charpentier	(France) Sébastien Charpentier	(France) Sébastien Charpentier	Winston Ten Kate Honda
3	24 April	Spain	Valencia	(France) Sébastien Charpentier	(France) Sébastien Charpentier	(France) Sébastien Charpentier	Winston Ten Kate Honda
4	8 May	Italy	Monza	(France) Sébastien Charpentier	(France) Sébastien Charpentier	(Japan) Katsuaki Fujiwara	Winston Ten Kate Honda
5	29 May	Europe	Silverstone	(France) Sébastien Charpentier	(France) Sébastien Charpentier	(France) Sébastien Charpentier	Winston Ten Kate Honda
6	26 June	San Marino	Misano	(France) Fabien Foret	(France) Sébastien Charpentier	(France) Sébastien Charpentier	Winston Ten Kate Honda
7	17 July	Czech Republic	Brno	(France) Sébastien Charpentier	(France) Sébastien Charpentier	(France) Sébastien Charpentier	Winston Ten Kate Honda
8	7 August	(United Kingdom) Great Britain	Brands Hatch	(France) Sébastien Charpentier	(France) Sébastien Charpentier	(France) Sébastien Charpentier	Winston Ten Kate Honda
9	4 September	Netherlands	Assen	(France) Sébastien Charpentier	(Japan) Katsuaki Fujiwara	(France) Fabien Foret	Team Megabike
10	11 September	Germany	Lausitzring	(France) Sébastien Charpentier	(Australia) Kevin Curtain	(Australia) Kevin Curtain	Yamaha Motor Germany
11	2 October	Italy	Imola	(France) Fabien Foret	(Italy) Michel Fabrizio	(Italy) Gianluca Nannelli	Ducati SC Caracchi
12	9 October	France	Magny-Cours	(Italy) Michel Fabrizio	(Italy) Michel Fabrizio	(Australia) Broc Parkes	Yamaha Motor Germany

== Entry list ==
Team	Constructor	Motorcycle	No.	Rider	Rounds
Ducati Selmat	Ducati	Ducati 749 R	3	(Netherlands) Jurgen van den Goorbergh	1–3
Ducati Selmat	Ducati	Ducati 749 R	13	(Italy) Alessio Corradi	4–5, 7–12
Ducati Selmat	Ducati	Ducati 749 R	14	(Italy) Andrea Berta	1–9, 11
Ducati Selmat	Ducati	Ducati 749 R	46	(Italy) Piergiorgio Bontempi	6
Ducati SC Caracchi	Ducati	Ducati 749 R	69	(Italy) Gianluca Nannelli	All
Ajo Promotion	Honda	Honda CBR600RR	28	(Finland) Sami Penna	3–12
Ajo Promotion	Honda	Honda CBR600RR	100	(Finland) Topi Haarala	3–12
Alapont Competition	Honda	Honda CBR600RR	34	(Spain) Jose Manuel Hurtado	11–12
Alapont Competition	Honda	Honda CBR600RR	65	(Spain) Garcia Forner	12
Alpha Technik Van Zon Honda	Honda	Honda CBR600RR	95	(Germany) jesco günther	10
Duntep Racing Team	Honda	Honda CBR600RR	92	(Netherlands) Joan Veijer	9
Gil Motorsport	Honda	Honda CBR600RR	8	(France) Stéphane Chambon	All
Glaner Castrol Honda	Honda	Honda CBR600RR	62	(Spain) Joan Lascorz	11
Hardinge Bridgeport	Honda	Honda CBR600RR	27	(United Kingdom) Tom Tunstall	5, 8–9
Improve Racing	Honda	Honda CBR600RR	161	(Italy) Simone Sanna	4, 6, 11
Intermoto Czech Republic	Honda	Honda CBR600RR	56	(Austria) Christian Zaiser	10, 12
Intermoto Czech Republic	Honda	Honda CBR600RR	58	(Czech Republic) Tomáš Mikšovský	1–9, 11
Intermoto Czech Republic	Honda	Honda CBR600RR	59	(Poland) Paweł Szkopek	1–10
Intermoto Czech Republic	Honda	Honda CBR600RR	68	(Thailand) Suhathai Chaemsup	11–12
Intermoto Czech Republic	Honda	Honda CBR600RR	161	(Italy) Simone Sanna	7
Italia Megabike	Honda	Honda CBR600RR	84	(Italy) Michel Fabrizio	All
J&E Sport Racing; Kunstgnas.com Racing Team	Honda	Honda CBR600RR	81	(Netherlands) Arie Vos	9, 11
Klaffi Honda	Honda	Honda CBR600RR	25	(Finland) Tatu Lauslehto	All
Klaffi Honda	Honda	Honda CBR600RR	67	(Denmark) Nicolai Sørensen	9
Klaffi Honda	Honda	Honda CBR600RR	76	(Germany) Steve Mizera	10
Le Grelle Dholda in Action	Honda	Honda CBR600RR	45	(Belgium) Sebastien Le Grelle	3–8, 10
Midland Racing Motoworld	Honda	Honda CBR600RR	90	(Czech Republic) Pavel Ouda	7
Northpoint Ekerold Honda	Honda	Honda CBR600RR	83	(United Kingdom) Craig Jones	5, 8
Northpoint Ekerold Honda	Honda	Honda CBR600RR	85	(United Kingdom) Cal Crutchlow	5, 8
R.A. Racing	Honda	Honda CBR600RR	80	(Italy) Alessio Anello	6
Start Team	Honda	Honda CBR600RR	82	(Italy) Camillo Mariottini	6, 11
Stiggy Motorsports	Honda	Honda CBR600RR	72	(Sweden) Stefan Folkesson	2
Stiggy Motorsports	Honda	Honda CBR600RR	116	(Sweden) Johan Stigefelt	2–12
Stiggy Motorsports	Honda	Honda CBR600RR	127	(Denmark) Robbin Harms	3–12
Team Megabike	Honda	Honda CBR600RR	99	(France) Fabien Foret	All
Ten Kate Kobutex Honda	Honda	Honda CBR600RR	36	(Slovenia) Luka Nedog	7
Van Zon Honda	Honda	Honda CBR600RR	71	(Belgium) Werner Daemen	3, 7, 10
Van Zon Honda	Honda	Honda CBR600RR	94	(Germany) Arne Tode	10
Winston Ten Kate Honda	Honda	Honda CBR600RR	16	(France) Sébastien Charpentier	1–11
Winston Ten Kate Honda	Honda	Honda CBR600RR	21	(Japan) Katsuaki Fujiwara	1–6, 8–12
Winston Ten Kate Honda	Honda	Honda CBR600RR	81	(Netherlands) Arie Vos	12
Winston Ten Kate Honda	Honda	Honda CBR600RR	83	(United Kingdom) Craig Jones	7
Kawasaki Bertocchi	Kawasaki	Kawasaki ZX-6RR	30	(Italy) Alessandro Antonello	1–8, 11
Kawasaki DocShop Racing	Kawasaki	Kawasaki ZX-6RR	49	(Norway) Kai Børre Andersen	10
Lightspeed Kawasaki	Kawasaki	Kawasaki ZX-6RR	15	(Italy) Matteo Baiocco	1–6
Lightspeed Kawasaki	Kawasaki	Kawasaki ZX-6RR	18	(Italy) Cristiano Migliorati	6–9
Lightspeed Kawasaki	Kawasaki	Kawasaki ZX-6RR	48	(Spain) David García	1–3, 5
Lightspeed Kawasaki	Kawasaki	Kawasaki ZX-6RR	51	(Italy) Robert Gianfardoni	7–12
Lightspeed Kawasaki	Kawasaki	Kawasaki ZX-6RR	55	(Italy) Niccolò Canepa	10–12
Lightspeed Kawasaki	Kawasaki	Kawasaki ZX-6RR	64	(France) Julien Da Costa	4
Lightspeed Kawasaki	Kawasaki	Kawasaki ZX-6RR	64	(France) Julien Da Costa	5
Pajic Kawasaki Racing Team	Kawasaki	Kawasaki ZX-6RR	97	(Netherlands) Mile Pajic	9
Passione Moto	Kawasaki	Kawasaki ZX-6RR	89	(Italy) Juri Proietto	6
Alstare Suzuki Corona Extra	Suzuki	Suzuki GSX 600RR	12	(Spain) Xavi Forés	All
Moto 1 - Suzuki	Suzuki	Suzuki GSX 600RR	24	(France) Christophe Cogan	1–5
Moto 1 - Suzuki	Suzuki	Suzuki GSX 600RR	31	(Canada) Chris Peris	6
Moto 1 - Suzuki	Suzuki	Suzuki GSX 600RR	42	(France) Matthieu Lagrive	7–12
Moto 1 - Suzuki	Suzuki	Suzuki GSX 600RR	78	(South Africa) Hudson Kennaugh	11–12
Suzuki Nederland	Suzuki	Suzuki GSX 600RR	19	(Netherlands) Jarno Jansen	3–12
Suzuki Nederland	Suzuki	Suzuki GSX 600RR	47	(Netherlands) Jarno Van Der Marel	9–10
Suzuki Nederland	Suzuki	Suzuki GSX 600RR	74	(Netherlands) Ron Van Steenbergen	11–12
Suzuki Nederland	Suzuki	Suzuki GSX 600RR	77	(Netherlands) Barry Veneman	3–8
Team Moto Vitesse Réunion	Suzuki	Suzuki GSX 600RR	61	(France) Thomas Metro	12
Team Oliveira Suzuki	Suzuki	Suzuki GSX 600RR	93	(Netherlands) Allard Kerkhoven	9
Bike Service	Yamaha	Yamaha YZF-R6	33	(Italy) Ivan Goi	4, 6, 11–12
LaGlisse	Yamaha	Yamaha YZF-R6	86	(Spain) Victor Carrasco	3
Promoracing	Yamaha	Yamaha YZF-R6	43	(Spain) Pablo Henrique	3
Promoracing	Yamaha	Yamaha YZF-R6	87	(Spain) Arturo Tizón	3
Solberg Racing	Yamaha	Yamaha YZF-R6	98	(Norway) Tage Solberg	10, 12
Tati Team Beaujolais Racing	Yamaha	Yamaha YZF-R6	73	(France) Gregory Lefort	12
Tati Team Beaujolais Racing	Yamaha	Yamaha YZF-R6	88	(France) Julian Enjolras	3–12
Tienne Racing Team	Yamaha	Yamaha YZF-R6	15	(Italy) Matteo Baiocco	11
VMN Racing	Yamaha	Yamaha YZF-R6	57	(Italy) Sergio Ruggiero	11
Yamaha Motor Germany	Yamaha	Yamaha YZF-R6	11	(Australia) Kevin Curtain	All
Yamaha Motor Germany	Yamaha	Yamaha YZF-R6	23	(Australia) Broc Parkes	All
Yamaha Racing Support	Yamaha	Yamaha YZF-R6	50	(Finland) Vesa Kallio	9
Yamaha Racing Support	Yamaha	Yamaha YZF-R6	81	(Netherlands) Arie Vos	6–8

Key
Regular rider
Wildcard rider
Replacement rider

- All entries used Pirelli tyres.

== Championship' standings ==
=== Riders' standings ===
Pos	Rider	Bike	LOS (Qatar)	PHI (Australia)	VAL (Spain)	MNZ (Italy)	SIL (Europe)	MIS (San Marino)	BRN (Czech Republic)	BRA (United Kingdom)	ASS (Netherlands)	LAU (Germany)	IMO (Italy)	MAG (France)	Pts
1	(France) Sébastien Charpentier	Honda	**2**	**1**	**1**	**2**	**1**	1	**1**	**1**	**2**	**Ret**	DNS		210
2	(Australia) Kevin Curtain	Yamaha	4	2	3	5	2	4	Ret	3	4	1	2	2	187
3	(Japan) Katsuaki Fujiwara	Honda	1	4	2	1	9	3		6	5	4	WD	7	149
4	(France) Fabien Foret	Honda	5	3	5	WD	3	**2**	Ret	5	1	3	**11**	4	144
5	(Italy) Michel Fabrizio	Honda	3	Ret	4	4	Ret	Ret	2	2	3	5	4	**3**	138
6	(Australia) Broc Parkes	Yamaha	6	7	6	7	5	5	Ret	Ret	7	2	5	1	125
7	(France) Stéphane Chambon	Honda	7	8	9	8	4	15	7	4	8	6	Ret	8	94
8	(Italy) Gianluca Nannelli	Ducati	9	Ret	8	3	7	Ret	3	Ret	DNS	DNS	1	9	88
9	(Spain) Xavi Forés	Suzuki	8	11	11	11	12	7	5	11	10	14	Ret	5	71
10	(Finland) Tatu Lauslehto	Honda	10	9	15	6	10	10	12	14	9	9	16	12	60
11	(Sweden) Johan Stigefelt	Honda		6	10	13	Ret	13	11	15	12	8	8	6	58
12	(Italy) Alessio Corradi	Ducati				DSQ	8		8	7	Ret	7	3	Ret	50
13	(Denmark) Robbin Harms	Honda			Ret	Ret	17	11	4	13	6	13	Ret	DNS	34
14	(Netherlands) Barry Veneman	Suzuki			7	12	6	12	10	DNS					33
15	(France) Mathieu Lagrive	Suzuki							14	9	11	Ret	10	10	26
16	(United Kingdom) Craig Jones	Honda					Ret		6	8					18
17	(Italy) Alessandro Antonello	Kawasaki	Ret	Ret	Ret	Ret	18	8	18	WD			6		18
18	(Netherlands) Arie Vos	Yamaha						18	21	19					17
18	(Netherlands) Arie Vos	Honda									13		7	11	17
19	(Belgium) Werner Daemen	Honda			12				9			10			17
20	(Belgium) Sebastien Le Grelle	Honda			13	10	11	WD	15	17		WD			15
21	(Czech Republic) Tomáš Mikšovský	Honda	12	13	19	14	19	Ret	20	20	Ret		13		12
22	(Netherlands) Jurgen van den Goorbergh	Ducati	Ret	5	DNS										11
23	(Italy) Simone Sanna	Honda				Ret		6	19				Ret		10
24	(Italy) Ivan Goi	Yamaha				9		16					Ret	13	10
25	(Italy) Cristiano Migliorati	Kawasaki						9	13	16	Ret				10
26	(Italy) Camilo Mariottini	Honda						14					9		9
27	(France) Christophe Cogan	Suzuki	Ret	10	16	Ret	16								6
28	(United Kingdom) Cal Crutchlow	Honda					Ret			10					6
29	(United Kingdom) Tom Tunstall	Honda					14			12	17				6
30	(Netherlands) Jarno Jansen	Suzuki			17	Ret	15	17	17	Ret	14	15	17	14	6
31	(Italy) Andrea Berta	Ducati	11	Ret	Ret	Ret	Ret	19	23	23	DNS		Ret		5
32	(Germany) Arne Tode	Honda										11			5
33	(Poland) Paweł Szkopek	Honda	13	14	Ret	19	Ret	23	24	21	21	Ret			5
34	(Spain) David García	Kawasaki	Ret	12	DNS		WD								4
35	(Norway) Kai Børre Andersen	Kawasaki										12			4
36	(France) Julien Enjolras	Yamaha			Ret	16	Ret	24	26	22	Ret	19	12	Ret	4
37	(France) Julien Da Costa	Kawasaki				DNS	13								3
38	(Italy) Matteo Baiocco	Kawasaki	14	Ret	Ret	15	DNS	Ret							3
38	(Italy) Matteo Baiocco	Yamaha											Ret		3
39	(Finland) Sami Penna	Honda			18	17	20	21	16	18	Ret	17	14	15	3
40	(Spain) Arturo Tizón	Yamaha			14										2
41	(Finland) Vesa Kallio	Yamaha									15				1
42	(Italy) Niccolò Canepa	Kawasaki										16	15	Ret	1
	(Netherlands) Jarno Van Der Marel	Suzuki									16	21			0
	(Spain) Javier Hurtado	Honda											Ret	16	0
	(France) Thomas Metro	Suzuki												17	0
	(Finland) Topi Haarala	Honda			Ret	18	Ret	22	22	Ret	Ret	Ret	Ret	19	0
	(Denmark) Nicolai Sørensen	Honda									18				0
	(Germany) Jesco Günther	Honda										18			0
	(South Africa) Hudson Kennaugh	Suzuki											18	Ret	0
	(Netherlands) Ron Van Steenbergen	Suzuki											Ret	18	0
	(Netherlands) Joan Veijer	Honda									19				0
	(Spain) Joan Lascorz	Honda											19		0
	(Italy) Piergiorgio Bontempi	Ducati						20							0
	(Netherlands) Mile Pajic	Kawasaki									20				0
	(Norway) Tage Solberg	Yamaha										20		WD	0
	(Thailand) Suhathai Chaemsup	Honda											20	Ret	0
	(Netherlands) Allard Kerkhoven	Suzuki									22				0
	(Germany) Steve Mizera	Honda										22			0
	(Italy) Robert Gianfardoni	Kawasaki							DNQ	DNQ	23	DNQ	Ret	Ret	0
	(Canada) Chris Peris	Suzuki						25							0
	(Czech Republic) Pavel Ouda	Honda							25						0
	(Italy) Alessio Anello	Honda						26							0
	(Slovenia) Luka Nedog	Honda							27						0
	(Spain) Pablo Henrique	Yamaha			Ret										0
	(Spain) Victor Carrasco	Yamaha			Ret										0
	(Italy) Juri Proietto	Kawasaki						Ret							0
	(Austria) Christian Zaiser	Honda										Ret		Ret	0
	(Italy) Sergio Ruggiero	Yamaha											Ret		0
	(Spain) Garcia Forner	Honda												Ret	0
	(France) Gregory Lefort	Yamaha												Ret	0
	(Sweden) Stefan Folkesson	Honda		WD											
Pos	Rider	Bike	LOS (Qatar)	PHI (Australia)	VAL (Spain)	MNZ (Italy)	SIL (Europe)	MIS (San Marino)	BRN (Czech Republic)	BRA (United Kingdom)	ASS (Netherlands)	LAU (Germany)	IMO (Italy)	MAG (France)	Pts

Colour	Result
Gold	Winner
Silver	Second place
Bronze	Third place
Green	Points classification
Blue	Non-points classification
Blue	Non-classified finish (NC)
Purple	Retired, not classified (Ret)
Red	Did not qualify (DNQ)
Red	Did not pre-qualify (DNPQ)
Black	Disqualified (DSQ)
White	Did not start (DNS)
White	Withdrew (WD)
White	Race cancelled (C)
Blank	Did not practice (DNP)
Blank	Did not arrive (DNA)
Blank	Excluded (EX)

**Bold** – Pole position
Italics – Fastest lap
Source :
