= 2010 Phillip Island Superbike World Championship round =

(Australia) 2010 Phillip Island Superbike World Championship round
Round details
- Round 1 of 13 rounds in the 2010 Superbike World Championship. and Round 1 of 13 rounds in the 2010 Supersport World Championship.
- Date: 28 February, 2010
- Location: Phillip Island
- Course: Permanent racing facility 4.445 km (2.762 mi)

Superbike World Championship
Pole position
(United Kingdom) Leon Haslam
1:31.229
Fastest lap race 1	Fastest lap race 2
(United Kingdom) Leon Haslam	(France) Sylvain Guintoli
1:32.193	1:32.236

Supersport World Championship
Pole position
(Spain) Joan Lascorz
1:33.847
Fastest lap
(Republic of Ireland) Eugene Laverty
1:35.204

The 2010 Phillip Island Superbike World Championship round was the first round of the 2010 Superbike World Championship season. It took place over the weekend of 26–28 February 2010, at the Phillip Island Grand Prix Circuit near Cowes, Victoria, Australia.

== Results ==
=== Superbike race 1 classification ===
Pos	No	Rider	Manufacturer	Laps	Time	Grid	Points
1	91	(United Kingdom) Leon Haslam	Suzuki GSX-R1000	22	34:13.435	1	25
2	84	(Italy) Michel Fabrizio	Ducati 1098R	22	+0.004	2	20
3	41	(Japan) Noriyuki Haga	Ducati 1098R	22	+0.769	10	16
4	65	(United Kingdom) Jonathan Rea	Honda CBR1000RR	22	+10.201	7	13
5	3	(Italy) Max Biaggi	Aprilia RSV4 1000 F	22	+10.782	11	11
6	50	(France) Sylvain Guintoli	Suzuki GSX-R1000	22	+11.079	5	10
7	7	(Spain) Carlos Checa	Ducati 1098R	22	+11.208	4	9
8	96	(Czech Republic) Jakub Smrž	Ducati 1098R	22	+16.522	6	8
9	11	(Australia) Troy Corser	BMW S1000RR	22	+20.291	13	7
10	57	(Italy) Lorenzo Lanzi	Ducati 1098R	22	+26.352	9	6
11	2	(United Kingdom) Leon Camier	Aprilia RSV4 1000 F	22	+29.775	16	5
12	76	(Germany) Max Neukirchner	Honda CBR1000RR	22	+30.155	17	4
13	66	(United Kingdom) Tom Sykes	Kawasaki ZX-10R	22	+31.951	12	3
14	67	(United Kingdom) Shane Byrne	Ducati 1098R	22	+31.957	18	2
15	88	(Australia) Andrew Pitt	BMW S1000RR	22	+55.082	19	1
16	31	(Italy) Vittorio Iannuzzo	Honda CBR1000RR	22	+1:10.932	22	
17	15	(Italy) Matteo Baiocco	Kawasaki ZX-10R	22	+1:11.237	23	
18	95	(United States) Roger Lee Hayden	Kawasaki ZX-10R	22	+1:17.357	24	
19	25	(Australia) Josh Brookes	Honda CBR1000RR	16	+6 Laps	21	
Ret	35	(United Kingdom) Cal Crutchlow	Yamaha YZF-R1	5	Accident	3	
Ret	77	(Australia) Chris Vermeulen	Kawasaki ZX-10R	3	Accident	14	
Ret	52	(United Kingdom) James Toseland	Yamaha YZF-R1	2	Accident	8	
DNS	111	(Spain) Rubén Xaus	BMW S1000RR		Injured during warm-up	15	
DNS	123	(Austria) Roland Resch	BMW S1000RR		Did not start	20	
OFFICIAL SUPERBIKE RACE 1 REPORT

=== Superbike race 2 classification ===
Pos	No	Rider	Manufacturer	Laps	Time	Grid	Points
1	7	(Spain) Carlos Checa	Ducati 1098R	22	34:16.428	4	25
2	91	(United Kingdom) Leon Haslam	Suzuki GSX-R1000	22	+0.307	1	20
3	84	(Italy) Michel Fabrizio	Ducati 1098R	22	+0.434	2	16
4	50	(France) Sylvain Guintoli	Suzuki GSX-R1000	22	+0.837	5	13
5	41	(Japan) Noriyuki Haga	Ducati 1098R	22	+3.453	10	11
6	65	(United Kingdom) Jonathan Rea	Honda CBR1000RR	22	+11.530	7	10
7	11	(Australia) Troy Corser	BMW S1000RR	22	+12.026	13	9
8	3	(Italy) Max Biaggi	Aprilia RSV4 1000 F	22	+13.068	11	8
9	35	(United Kingdom) Cal Crutchlow	Yamaha YZF-R1	22	+14.401	3	7
10	52	(United Kingdom) James Toseland	Yamaha YZF-R1	22	+14.707	8	6
11	2	(United Kingdom) Leon Camier	Aprilia RSV4 1000 F	22	+14.743	16	5
12	67	(United Kingdom) Shane Byrne	Ducati 1098R	22	+14.851	18	4
13	57	(Italy) Lorenzo Lanzi	Ducati 1098R	22	+15.143	9	3
14	25	(Australia) Josh Brookes	Honda CBR1000RR	22	+30.947	21	2
15	88	(Australia) Andrew Pitt	BMW S1000RR	22	+41.855	19	1
16	76	(Germany) Max Neukirchner	Honda CBR1000RR	22	+48.844	17	
17	31	(Italy) Vittorio Iannuzzo	Honda CBR1000RR	22	+1:06.866	22	
18	95	(United States) Roger Lee Hayden	Kawasaki ZX-10R	22	+1:07.751	24	
Ret	15	(Italy) Matteo Baiocco	Kawasaki ZX-10R	17	Retirement	23	
Ret	66	(United Kingdom) Tom Sykes	Kawasaki ZX-10R	13	Retirement	12	
Ret	77	(Australia) Chris Vermeulen	Kawasaki ZX-10R	7	Accident	14	
Ret	96	(Czech Republic) Jakub Smrž	Ducati 1098R	6	Accident	6	
DNS	111	(Spain) Rubén Xaus	BMW S1000RR		Injured during warm-up	15	
DNS	123	(Austria) Roland Resch	BMW S1000RR		Did not start	20	
OFFICIAL SUPERBIKE RACE 2 REPORT

=== Supersport race classification ===
Pos	No	Rider	Manufacturer	Laps	Time	Grid	Points
1	50	(Republic of Ireland) Eugene Laverty	Honda CBR600RR	21	33:37.836	4	25
2	26	(Spain) Joan Lascorz	Kawasaki ZX-6R	21	+4.359	1	20
3	54	(Turkey) Kenan Sofuoğlu	Honda CBR600RR	21	+4.500	2	16
4	25	(Spain) David Salom	Triumph Daytona 675	21	+11.779	6	13
5	99	(France) Fabien Foret	Kawasaki ZX-6R	21	+17.266	10	11
6	55	(Italy) Massimo Roccoli	Honda CBR600RR	21	+25.034	9	10
7	127	(Denmark) Robbin Harms	Honda CBR600RR	21	+27.834	8	9
8	40	(United States) Jason DiSalvo	Triumph Daytona 675	21	+30.102	12	8
9	117	(Portugal) Miguel Praia	Honda CBR600RR	21	+31.931	11	7
10	4	(United Kingdom) Gino Rea	Honda CBR600RR	21	+31.991	14	6
11	37	(Japan) Katsuaki Fujiwara	Kawasaki ZX-6R	21	+40.552	5	5
12	7	(United Kingdom) Chaz Davies	Triumph Daytona 675	21	+40.556	7	4
13	16	(France) Sébastien Charpentier	Triumph Daytona 675	21	+1:28.553	13	3
14	33	(Italy) Paola Cazzola	Honda CBR600RR	20	+1 Lap	17	2
15	9	(Italy) Danilo Dell'Omo	Honda CBR600RR	19	+2 Laps	16	1
Ret	51	(Italy) Michele Pirro	Honda CBR600RR	13	Mechanical	3	
Ret	5	(Sweden) Alexander Lundh	Honda CBR600RR	7	Accident	15	
OFFICIAL SUPERSPORT RACE REPORT
