= 2009 Brno Superbike World Championship round =

(Czech Republic) 2009 Brno Superbike World Championship round
Round details
- Round 10 of 14 rounds in the 2009 Superbike World Championship. and Round 10 of 14 rounds in the 2009 Supersport World Championship.
- Date: July 26, 2009
- Location: Masaryk Circuit
- Course: Permanent racing facility 5.403 km (3.357 mi)

Superbike World Championship
Pole position
(United States) Ben Spies
1:58.868
Fastest lap race 1	Fastest lap race 2
(Italy) Michel Fabrizio	(Italy) Max Biaggi
2:00.116	1:59.961

Supersport World Championship
Pole position
(United Kingdom) Cal Crutchlow
2:02.060
Fastest lap
(United Kingdom) Cal Crutchlow
2:02.708

The 2009 Brno Superbike World Championship round was the tenth round of the 2009 Superbike World Championship season. It took place on the weekend of July 24-26, 2009 at the Masaryk Circuit located in Brno. Ben Spies, Michel Fabrizio and Max Biaggi were the three dominant riders on pace all weekend - Fabrizio took Spies out in a collision in race one (handing Aprilia their first win since returning to WSBK at the start of the season), before all three were on the race two podium. Checa and Rea gave Ten Kate their first ever double WSBK podium finish in race one. Championship leader Noriyuki Haga was still not 100% fit following his huge crash at Mugello in the previous round, but Spies' non-finish in race one reduced the damage to his championship. Troy Corser made flying starts to lead both races on the BMW, while his teammate Rubén Xaus suffered a broken leg in a big crash on lap one of race one.

== Results ==
=== Superbike race 1 ===
Pos	No	Rider	Bike	Laps	Time	Grid	Points
1	3	(Italy) Max Biaggi	Aprilia RSV4	20	40:18.306	3	25
2	7	(Spain) Carlos Checa	Honda CBR1000RR	20	+3.631	10	20
3	65	(United Kingdom) Jonathan Rea	Honda CBR1000RR	20	+9.948	4	16
4	67	(United Kingdom) Shane Byrne	Ducati 1098R	20	+12.952	5	13
5	11	(Australia) Troy Corser	BMW S1000RR	20	+14.599	6	11
6	96	(Czech Republic) Jakub Smrž	Ducati 1098R	20	+19.359	12	10
7	91	(United Kingdom) Leon Haslam	Honda CBR1000RR	20	+19.680	17	9
8	41	(Japan) Noriyuki Haga	Ducati 1098R	20	+20.731	14	8
9	14	(France) Matthieu Lagrive	Honda CBR1000RR	20	+21.923	16	7
10	100	(Japan) Makoto Tamada	Kawasaki ZX-10R	20	+27.807	11	6
11	10	(Spain) Fonsi Nieto	Ducati 1098R	20	+35.263	21	5
12	23	(Australia) Broc Parkes	Kawasaki ZX-10R	20	+36.535	19	4
13	9	(Japan) Ryuichi Kiyonari	Honda CBR1000RR	20	+38.586	18	3
14	71	(Japan) Yukio Kagayama	Suzuki GSX-R1000 K9	20	+40.061	13	2
15	77	(Italy) Vittorio Iannuzzo	Honda CBR1000RR	20	+40.280	24	1
16	99	(Italy) Luca Scassa	Kawasaki ZX-10R	20	+40.641	23	
17	25	(Spain) David Salom	Kawasaki ZX-10R	20	+1'10.529	22	
18	94	(Spain) David Checa	Yamaha YZF-R1	20	+1:14.874	26	
19	88	(Austria) Roland Resch	Suzuki GSX-R1000 K9	20	+1:42.979	27	
20	51	(Czech Republic) Miloš Čihák	Suzuki GSX-R1000 K9	20	+1:43.111	28	
Ret	66	(United Kingdom) Tom Sykes	Yamaha YZF-R1	19	Retirement	8	
Ret	53	(Italy) Alex Polita	Suzuki GSX-R1000 K9	14	Accident	25	
Ret	121	(United States) John Hopkins	Honda CBR1000RR	10	Accident	20	
Ret	56	(Japan) Shinya Nakano	Aprilia RSV4	8	Retirement	15	
Ret	19	(United States) Ben Spies	Yamaha YZF-R1	4	Accident	1	
Ret	84	(Italy) Michel Fabrizio	Ducati 1098R	4	Accident	2	
Ret	57	(Italy) Lorenzo Lanzi	Ducati 1098R	2	Accident	9	
Ret	111	(Spain) Rubén Xaus	BMW S1000RR	0	Accident	7	

=== Superbike race 2 ===
Pos	No	Rider	Bike	Laps	Time	Grid	Points
1	19	(United States) Ben Spies	Yamaha YZF-R1	20	40:15.420	1	25
2	3	(Italy) Max Biaggi	Aprilia RSV4	20	+0.213	3	20
3	84	(Italy) Michel Fabrizio	Ducati 1098R	20	+0.657	2	16
4	65	(United Kingdom) Jonathan Rea	Honda CBR1000RR	20	+8.311	4	13
5	7	(Spain) Carlos Checa	Honda CBR1000RR	20	+8.915	10	11
6	41	(Japan) Noriyuki Haga	Ducati 1098R	20	+21.175	14	10
7	66	(United Kingdom) Tom Sykes	Yamaha YZF-R1	20	+21.384	8	9
8	67	(United Kingdom) Shane Byrne	Ducati 1098R	20	+21.599	5	8
9	96	(Czech Republic) Jakub Smrž	Ducati 1098R	20	+21.726	12	7
10	11	(Australia) Troy Corser	BMW S1000RR	20	+25.180	6	6
11	56	(Japan) Shinya Nakano	Aprilia RSV4	20	+25.612	15	5
12	91	(United Kingdom) Leon Haslam	Honda CBR1000RR	20	+25.622	17	4
13	9	(Japan) Ryuichi Kiyonari	Honda CBR1000RR	20	+26.246	18	3
14	14	(France) Matthieu Lagrive	Honda CBR1000RR	20	+31.098	16	2
15	57	(Italy) Lorenzo Lanzi	Ducati 1098R	20	+32.706	9	1
16	23	(Australia) Broc Parkes	Kawasaki ZX-10R	20	+33.173	19	
17	10	(Spain) Fonsi Nieto	Ducati 1098R	20	+34.953	21	
18	77	(Italy) Vittorio Iannuzzo	Honda CBR1000RR	20	+57.751	24	
19	94	(Spain) David Checa	Yamaha YZF-R1	20	+1:00.273	26	
20	88	(Austria) Roland Resch	Suzuki GSX-R1000 K9	20	+1:29.794	27	
Ret	53	(Italy) Alex Polita	Suzuki GSX-R1000 K9	12	Retirement	25	
Ret	99	(Italy) Luca Scassa	Kawasaki ZX-10R	7	Accident	23	
Ret	51	(Czech Republic) Miloš Čihák	Suzuki GSX-R1000 K9	7	Mechanical	28	
Ret	121	(United States) John Hopkins	Honda CBR1000RR	6	Retirement	20	
Ret	71	(Japan) Yukio Kagayama	Suzuki GSX-R1000 K9	6	Accident	13	
Ret	25	(Spain) David Salom	Kawasaki ZX-10R	5	Retirement	22	
Ret	100	(Japan) Makoto Tamada	Kawasaki ZX-10R	3	Accident	11	
DNS	111	(Spain) Rubén Xaus	BMW S1000RR			7	

=== Supersport race ===
Pos	No	Rider	Bike	Laps	Time	Grid	Points
1	99	(France) Fabien Foret	Yamaha YZF-R6	18	37:14.367	7	25
2	13	(Australia) Anthony West	Honda CBR600RR	18	+0.148	10	20
3	26	(Spain) Joan Lascorz	Kawasaki ZX-6R	18	+0.289	3	16
4	21	(Japan) Katsuaki Fujiwara	Kawasaki ZX-6R	18	+0.400	4	13
5	50	(Republic of Ireland) Eugene Laverty	Honda CBR600RR	18	+6.823	2	11
6	132	(South Africa) Sheridan Morais	Yamaha YZF-R6	18	+14.896	13	10
7	55	(Italy) Massimo Roccoli	Honda CBR600RR	18	+15.092	9	9
8	24	(Australia) Garry McCoy	Triumph Daytona 675	18	+15.634	6	8
9	54	(Turkey) Kenan Sofuoğlu	Honda CBR600RR	18	+18.592	14	7
10	1	(Australia) Andrew Pitt	Honda CBR600RR	18	+29.679	24	6
11	77	(Netherlands) Barry Veneman	Honda CBR600RR	18	+29.803	17	5
12	9	(Italy) Danilo Dell'Omo	Honda CBR600RR	18	+30.215	15	4
13	25	(United Kingdom) Michael Laverty	Honda CBR600RR	18	+30.517	20	3
14	105	(Italy) Gianluca Vizziello	Honda CBR600RR	18	+40.163	21	2
15	30	(Germany) Jesco Günther	Honda CBR600RR	18	+46.026	18	1
16	22	(Romania) Robert Mureșan	Triumph Daytona 675	18	+52.714	26	
17	28	(Netherlands) Arie Vos	Honda CBR600RR	18	+54.285	19	
18	16	(United Kingdom) Sam Lowes	Honda CBR600RR	18	+1'26.735	27	
19	88	(Spain) Yannick Guerra	Yamaha YZF-R6	18	+1'30.289	28	
20	66	(Czech Republic) Jiří Brož	Honda CBR600RR	18	+1'57.684	29	
Ret	35	(United Kingdom) Cal Crutchlow	Yamaha YZF-R6	16	Retirement	1	
Ret	15	(Australia) Jason O'Halloran	Honda CBR600RR	15	Accident	25	
Ret	96	(Czech Republic) Matěj Smrž	Triumph Daytona 675	14	Mechanical	23	
Ret	7	(Czech Republic) Patrik Vostárek	Honda CBR600RR	9	Mechanical	22	
Ret	69	(Italy) Gianluca Nannelli	Triumph Daytona 675	9	Retirement	5	
Ret	117	(Portugal) Miguel Praia	Honda CBR600RR	8	Retirement	12	
Ret	127	(Denmark) Robbin Harms	Honda CBR600RR	6	Accident	16	
Ret	8	(Australia) Mark Aitchison	Honda CBR600RR	6	Retirement	11	
Ret	51	(Italy) Michele Pirro	Yamaha YZF-R6	1	Retirement	8	

== Superstock 1000 race ==
Pos.	No.	Rider	Bike	Laps	Time/Retired	Grid	Points
1	19	(Belgium) Xavier Simeon	Ducati 1098R	12	24:52.839	1	25
2	112	(Spain) Javier Forés	Kawasaki ZX-10R	12	+8.022	3	20
3	69	(Czech Republic) Ondřej Ježek	Honda CBR1000RR	12	+8.079	5	16
4	20	(France) Sylvain Barrier	Yamaha YZF-R1	12	+9.607	6	13
5	29	(Italy) Daniele Beretta	Ducati 1098R	12	+9.666	8	11
6	71	(Italy) Claudio Corti	Suzuki GSX-R1000 K9	12	+9.922	4	10
7	3	(Sweden) Alexander Lundh	Honda CBR1000RR	12	+18.270	10	9
8	7	(Austria) René Mähr	Suzuki GSX-R1000 K9	12	+19.494	11	8
9	34	(Italy) Davide Giugliano	Suzuki GSX-R1000 K9	12	+24.679	12	7
10	51	(Spain) Santiago Barragán	Honda CBR1000RR	12	+24.936	15	6
11	30	(Switzerland) Michaël Savary	Honda CBR1000RR	12	+30.534	18	5
12	23	(Italy) Federico Sandi	Aprilia RSV4 Factory	12	+30.733	16	4
13	22	(United Kingdom) Alex Lowes	MV Agusta F4 312 R	12	+30.739	7	3
14	117	(Italy) Denis Sacchetti	Honda CBR1000RR	12	+32.616	19	2
15	84	(Italy) Fabio Massei	Yamaha YZF-R1	12	+38.379	25	1
16	93	(France) Mathieu Lussiana	Yamaha YZF-R1	12	+38.599	23	
17	11	(Spain) Pere Tutusaus	KTM RC8 R	12	+40.930	29	
18	57	(Norway) Kim Arne Sletten	Yamaha YZF-R1	12	+46.815	28	
19	72	(France) Nicolas Pouhair	Yamaha YZF-R1	12	+47.024	31	
20	12	(Italy) Nico Vivarelli	KTM RC8 R	12	+47.108	30	
21	41	(Italy) Lorenzo Baroni	Yamaha YZF-R1	12	+50.166	32	
22	120	(Poland) Marcin Walkowiak	Yamaha YZF-R1	12	+53.286	21	
23	36	(Brazil) Philippe Thiriet	Honda CBR1000RR	12	+1:02.486	33	
24	14	(Italy) Federico Biaggi	Aprilia RSV4 Factory	12	+1:18.020	34	
25	64	(Italy) Danilo Andric	Yamaha YZF-R1	12	+1:18.885	35	
Ret	21	(France) Maxime Berger	Honda CBR1000RR	11	Accident	2	
Ret	25	(United Kingdom) Gregg Black	Yamaha YZF-R1	8	Retirement	26	
Ret	111	(Spain) Ismael Ortega	Kawasaki ZX-10R	7	Retirement	24	
Ret	63	(Sweden) Per Björk	Honda CBR1000RR	6	Technical problem	20	
Ret	77	(United Kingdom) Barry Burrell	Honda CBR1000RR	5	Retirement	17	
Ret	65	(France) Loris Baz	Yamaha YZF-R1	3	Accident	9	
Ret	8	(Italy) Andrea Antonelli	Yamaha YZF-R1	3	Retirement	13	
Ret	16	(Netherlands) Raymond Schouten	Yamaha YZF-R1	2	Accident	14	
Ret	107	(Italy) Niccolò Rosso	Yamaha YZF-R1	1	Accident	27	
DNS	53	(Germany) Dominic Lammert	Suzuki GSX-R1000 K9	0	Did not start	22	
EX	91	(Sweden) Hampus Johansson	Yamaha YZF-R1		Excluded		
WD	2	(Italy) Luca Morelli	Kawasaki ZX-10R		Withdrew		
WD	66	(Poland) Mateusz Stoklosa	Honda CBR1000RR		Withdrew		

== Superstock 600 race classification ==
Pos.	No.	Rider	Bike	Laps	Time/Retired	Grid	Points
1	55	(Belgium) Vincent Lonbois	Yamaha YZF-R6	9	19:19.920	1	25
2	9	(Italy) Danilo Petrucci	Yamaha YZF-R6	9	+0.191	4	20
3	47	(Italy) Eddi La Marra	Honda CBR600RR	9	+0.247	3	16
4	11	(France) Jérémy Guarnoni	Yamaha YZF-R6	9	+0.315	5	13
5	72	(Norway) Fredrik Karlsen	Yamaha YZF-R6	9	+1.087	8	11
6	4	(United Kingdom) Gino Rea	Honda CBR600RR	9	+1.207	2	10
7	5	(Italy) Marco Bussolotti	Yamaha YZF-R6	9	+1.262	6	9
8	89	(Austria) Stefan Kerschbaumer	Yamaha YZF-R6	9	+5.866	7	8
9	7	(France) Bapiste Guittet	Honda CBR600RR	9	+5.900	11	7
10	23	(Switzerland) Christian Von Gunten	Suzuki GSX-R600	9	+32.579	16	6
11	6	(France) Jonathan Martinez	Honda CBR600RR	9	+32.920	18	5
12	191	(Slovakia) Tomáš Krajči	Yamaha YZF-R6	9	+33.035	13	4
13	10	(Spain) Nacho Calero	Yamaha YZF-R6	9	+33.059	19	3
14	65	(Slovakia) Tomáš Svitok	Honda CBR600RR	9	+33.235	15	2
15	26	(Romania) Mircea Vrăjitoru	Yamaha YZF-R6	9	+33.499	17	1
16	81	(Czech Republic) David Látr	Honda CBR600RR	9	+40.365	21	
17	48	(South Africa) James Waterman	Yamaha YZF-R6	9	+52.416	22	
18	12	(Italy) Riccardo Cecchini	Honda CBR600RR	9	+56.216 (Note: 20 second penalty.)	12	
19	132	(Italy) Daniele Manfrinati	Honda CBR600RR	9	+1:05.032	20	
20	30	(Romania) Bogdan Vrăjitoru	Yamaha YZF-R6	9	+1:43.414	23	
Ret	36	(Poland) Andrzej Chmielewski	Yamaha YZF-R6	3	Retirement	14	
Ret	19	(Italy) Nico Morelli	Honda CBR600RR	1	Accident	9	
Ret	99	(Czech Republic) Michal Salač	Yamaha YZF-R6	0	Accident	10	
WD	13	(Italy) Dino Lombardi	Yamaha YZF-R6		Withdrew		
