= 2011 Misano Superbike World Championship round =

(San Marino) 2011 Misano Superbike World Championship round
Round details
- Round 6 of 13 rounds in the 2011 Superbike World Championship. and Round 5 of 12 rounds in the 2011 Supersport World Championship.
- Date: June 12, 2011
- Location: Misano
- Course: Permanent racing facility 4.226 km (2.626 mi)

Superbike World Championship
Pole position
(United Kingdom) Tom Sykes
1:55.197
Fastest lap race 1	Fastest lap race 2
(Spain) Carlos Checa	(Spain) Carlos Checa
1:36.660	1:36.520

Supersport World Championship
Pole position
(United Kingdom) Sam Lowes
1:39.541
Fastest lap
(France) Fabien Foret
1:40.054

The 2011 Misano Superbike World Championship round was the sixth round of the 2011 Superbike World Championship. It took place on the weekend of June 10–12, 2011 at the Misano Adriatico circuit in Misano Adriatico, Italy.

== Results ==
=== Superbike race 1 classification ===
Pos.	No.	Rider	Bike	Laps	Time/Retired	Grid	Points
1	7	(Spain) Carlos Checa	Ducati 1098R	24	39:03.132	2	25
2	1	(Italy) Max Biaggi	Aprilia RSV4 Factory	24	+0.984	7	20
3	33	(Italy) Marco Melandri	Yamaha YZF-R1	24	+17.124	4	16
4	66	(United Kingdom) Tom Sykes	Kawasaki ZX-10R	24	+18.652	1	13
5	58	(Republic of Ireland) Eugene Laverty	Yamaha YZF-R1	24	+18.929	10	11
6	2	(United Kingdom) Leon Camier	Aprilia RSV4 Factory	24	+21.003	15	10
7	50	(France) Sylvain Guintoli	Ducati 1098R	24	+22.942	8	9
8	86	(Italy) Ayrton Badovini	BMW S1000RR	24	+23.117	9	8
9	17	(Spain) Joan Lascorz	Kawasaki ZX-10R	24	+31.729	11	7
10	121	(France) Maxime Berger	Ducati 1098R	24	+34.466	13	6
11	111	(Spain) Rubén Xaus	Honda CBR1000RR	24	+36.683	14	5
12	15	(Italy) Matteo Baiocco	Ducati 1098R	24	+37.692	17	4
13	53	(Italy) Alessandro Polita	Ducati 1098R	24	+37.984	19	3
14	77	(Australia) Chris Vermeulen	Kawasaki ZX-10R	24	+41.016	21	2
15	57	(Italy) Lorenzo Lanzi	BMW S1000RR	24	+43.514	18	1
Ret	8	(Australia) Mark Aitchison	Kawasaki ZX-10R	20	Retirement	22	
Ret	44	(Italy) Roberto Rolfo	Kawasaki ZX-10R	14	Retirement	20	
Ret	91	(United Kingdom) Leon Haslam	BMW S1000RR	9	Accident	5	
Ret	11	(Australia) Troy Corser	BMW S1000RR	5	Retirement	6	
Ret	41	(Japan) Noriyuki Haga	Aprilia RSV4 Factory	4	Retirement	16	
Ret	96	(Czech Republic) Jakub Smrž	Ducati 1098R	3	Accident	3	
Ret	84	(Italy) Michel Fabrizio	Suzuki GSX-R 1000	1	Accident	12	
DNS	4	(United Kingdom) Jonathan Rea	Honda CBR1000RR		Injured		
OFFICIAL SUPERBIKE RACE 1 REPORT

=== Superbike race 2 classification ===
Pos.	No.	Rider	Bike	Laps	Time/Retired	Grid	Points
1	7	(Spain) Carlos Checa	Ducati 1098R	14	22:44.117	2	25
2	1	(Italy) Max Biaggi	Aprilia RSV4 Factory	14	+1.484	6	20
3	41	(Japan) Noriyuki Haga	Aprilia RSV4 Factory	14	+7.772	15	16
4	86	(Italy) Ayrton Badovini	BMW S1000RR	14	+7.856	8	13
5	91	(United Kingdom) Leon Haslam	BMW S1000RR	14	+9.714	5	11
6	84	(Italy) Michel Fabrizio	Suzuki GSX-R 1000	14	+10.777	11	10
7	50	(France) Sylvain Guintoli	Ducati 1098R	14	+10.875	7	9
8	111	(Spain) Rubén Xaus	Honda CBR1000RR	14	+13.483	13	8
9	17	(Spain) Joan Lascorz	Kawasaki ZX-10R	14	+13.576	10	7
10	77	(Australia) Chris Vermeulen	Kawasaki ZX-10R	14	+17.962	20	6
11	57	(Italy) Lorenzo Lanzi	BMW S1000RR	14	+22.768	17	5
12	44	(Italy) Roberto Rolfo	Kawasaki ZX-10R	14	+24.535	19	4
13	58	(Republic of Ireland) Eugene Laverty	Yamaha YZF-R1	14	+51.895	9	3
14	66	(United Kingdom) Tom Sykes	Kawasaki ZX-10R	14	+1:04.134	1	2
Ret	121	(France) Maxime Berger	Ducati 1098R	8	Retirement	12	
Ret	96	(Czech Republic) Jakub Smrž	Ducati 1098R	5	Accident	3	
Ret	15	(Italy) Matteo Baiocco	Ducati 1098R	3	Accident	16	
Ret	33	(Italy) Marco Melandri	Yamaha YZF-R1	0	Not restarted	4	
Ret	2	(United Kingdom) Leon Camier	Aprilia RSV4 Factory	0	Not restarted	14	
Ret	53	(Italy) Alessandro Polita	Ducati 1098R	0	Retired in 1st part	18	
Ret	8	(Australia) Mark Aitchison	Kawasaki ZX-10R	0	Retired in 1st part	21	
DNS	11	(Australia) Troy Corser	BMW S1000RR		Did not start		
DNS	4	(United Kingdom) Jonathan Rea	Honda CBR1000RR		Injured		
OFFICIAL SUPERBIKE RACE 2 REPORT

=== Supersport race classification ===
Pos.	No.	Rider	Bike	Laps	Time/Retired	Grid	Points
1	23	(Australia) Broc Parkes	Kawasaki ZX-6R	22	37:00.851	4	25
2	99	(France) Fabien Foret	Honda CBR600RR	22	+1.933	5	20
3	11	(United Kingdom) Sam Lowes	Honda CBR600RR	22	+2.890	1	16
4	44	(Spain) David Salom	Kawasaki ZX-6R	22	+3.262	3	13
5	157	(Italy) Ilario Dionisi	Honda CBR600RR	22	+4.976	6	11
6	7	(United Kingdom) Chaz Davies	Yamaha YZF-R6	22	+7.024	2	10
7	77	(United Kingdom) James Ellison	Honda CBR600RR	22	+7.344	10	9
8	127	(Denmark) Robbin Harms	Honda CBR600RR	22	+16.093	7	8
9	22	(Italy) Roberto Tamburini	Yamaha YZF-R6	22	+16.353	11	7
10	4	(United Kingdom) Gino Rea	Honda CBR600RR	22	+16.427	14	6
11	21	(France) Florian Marino	Honda CBR600RR	22	+29.225	8	5
12	117	(Portugal) Miguel Praia	Honda CBR600RR	22	+35.517	21	4
13	51	(Italy) Alessio Velini	Honda CBR600RR	22	+36.188	13	3
14	114	(Switzerland) Roman Stamm	Honda CBR600RR	22	+36.368	29	2
15	5	(Sweden) Alexander Lundh	Honda CBR600RR	22	+41.190	22	1
16	60	(Ukraine) Vladimir Ivanov	Honda CBR600RR	22	+44.311	15	
17	65	(Russia) Vladimir Leonov	Yamaha YZF-R6	22	+48.359	20	
18	38	(Hungary) Balázs Németh	Honda CBR600RR	22	+58.136	28	
19	25	(Slovenia) Marko Jerman	Triumph Daytona 675	22	+58.741	31	
20	10	(Hungary) Imre Tóth	Honda CBR600RR	22	+1:08.274	24	
21	34	(South Africa) Ronan Quarmby	Triumph Daytona 675	22	+1:10.559	30	
22	82	(Italy) Iuri Vigilucci	Yamaha YZF-R6	22	+1:29.418	26	
23	73	(Russia) Oleg Pozdneev	Yamaha YZF-R6	21	+1 lap	37	
24	12	(Italy) Stefano Cruciani	Kawasaki ZX-6R	19	+3 laps	14	
Ret	32	(Italy) Mirko Giansanti	Kawasaki ZX-6R	20	Accident	12	
Ret	31	(Italy) Vittorio Iannuzzo	Kawasaki ZX-6R	19	Accident	19	
Ret	30	(Russia) Valery Yurchenko	Yamaha YZF-R6	19	Accident	35	
Ret	24	(Russia) Eduard Blokhin	Yamaha YZF-R6	11	Retirement	36	
Ret	87	(Italy) Luca Marconi	Yamaha YZF-R6	8	Accident	25	
Ret	55	(Italy) Massimo Roccoli	Kawasaki ZX-6R	6	Mechanical	9	
Ret	33	(Austria) Yves Polzer	Yamaha YZF-R6	6	Retirement	34	
Ret	121	(Italy) William Marconi	Yamaha YZF-R6	4	Mechanical	27	
Ret	91	(Italy) Danilo Dell'Omo	Triumph Daytona 675	2	Retirement	17	
Ret	69	(Czech Republic) Ondřej Ježek	Honda CBR600RR	0	Retirement	23	
Ret	28	(Poland) Paweł Szkopek	Honda CBR600RR	0	Accident	18	
DNS	79	(Italy) Giuliano Rovelli	Yamaha YZF-R6		Did not start	32	
DNS	19	(Australia) Mitchell Pirotta	Honda CBR600RR		Did not start	33	
OFFICIAL SUPERSPORT RACE REPORT

=== Superstock 1000 race classification ===
The race was stopped after an accident involving Michal Salač at turn 14, the race wasn't resumed and the results were taken from lap 10, full points were awarded.

Pos.	No.	Rider	Bike	Laps	Time/Retired	Grid	Points
1	34	(Italy) Davide Giugliano	Ducati 1098R	10	16.36.317	2	25
2	9	(Italy) Danilo Petrucci	Ducati 1098R	10	+3.180	1	20
3	87	(Italy) Lorenzo Zanetti	BMW S1000RR	10	+5.253	6	16
4	20	(France) Sylvain Barrier	BMW S1000RR	10	+10.668	3	13
5	59	(Italy) Niccolò Canepa	Kawasaki ZX-10R	10	+11.559	5	11
6	119	(Italy) Michele Magnoni	BMW S1000RR	10	+14.552	8	10
7	15	(Italy) Fabio Massei	BMW S1000RR	10	+15.413	12	9
8	47	(Italy) Eddi La Marra	Honda CBR1000RR	10	+16.063	13	8
9	5	(Italy) Marco Bussolotti	Kawasaki ZX-10R	10	+19.916	9	7
10	6	(Italy) Lorenzo Savadori	Kawasaki ZX-10R	10	+19.988	14	6
11	67	(Australia) Bryan Staring	Kawasaki ZX-10R	10	+20.758	11	5
12	14	(Italy) Lorenzo Baroni	Ducati 1098R	10	+21.188	10	4
13	32	(South Africa) Sheridan Morais	Kawasaki ZX-10R	10	+21.851	7	3
14	23	(Italy) Luca Verdini	Honda CBR1000RR	10	+24.372	16	2
15	36	(Argentina) Leandro Mercado	Kawasaki ZX-10R	10	+29.333	21	1
16	11	(France) Jérémy Guarnoni	Yamaha YZF-R1	10	+33.023	25	
17	55	(Slovakia) Tomáš Svitok	Ducati 1098R	10	+34.736	23	
18	12	(Italy) Nico Vivarelli	Kawasaki ZX-10R	10	+35.561	19	
19	21	(Germany) Markus Reiterberger	BMW S1000RR	10	+35.697	17	
20	71	(Netherlands) Roy Ten Napel	Honda CBR1000RR	10	+36.236	24	
21	86	(Australia) Beau Beaton	BMW S1000RR	10	+45.255	22	
22	120	(Poland) Marcin Walkowiak	Honda CBR1000RR	10	+51.017	30	
23	39	(France) Randy Pagaud	BMW S1000RR	10	+51.198	28	
24	27	(Switzerland) Thomas Caiani	Kawasaki ZX-10R	10	+51.768	29	
25	58	(Switzerland) Gabriel Berclaz	Honda CBR1000RR	10	+51.854	27	
26	30	(Romania) Bogdan Vrăjitoru	Yamaha YZF-R1	10	+1:08.343	34	
27	141	(Portugal) Sérgio Batista	Kawasaki ZX-10R	10	+1:19.510	33	
Ret	89	(Czech Republic) Michal Salač	BMW S1000RR	10	Accident	32	
Ret	29	(Italy) Daniele Beretta	Honda CBR1000RR	9	Accident	20	
Ret	93	(France) Mathieu Lussiana	BMW S1000RR	4	Accident	18	
Ret	40	(Hungary) Alen Győrfi	Honda CBR1000RR	1	Accident	31	
Ret	24	(Italy) Roberto Anastasia	Honda CBR1000RR	1	Accident	26	
Ret	37	(Italy) Andrea Boscoscuro	Ducati 1098R	0	Retirement	15	
Ret	8	(Italy) Andrea Antonelli	Honda CBR1000RR	0	Accident	4	
OFFICIAL SUPERSTOCK 1000 RACE REPORT

=== Superstock 600 race classification ===
Pos.	No.	Rider	Bike	Laps	Time/Retired	Grid	Points
1	33	(Italy) Giuliano Gregorini	Yamaha YZF-R6	12	24:53.471	1	25
2	3	(Australia) Jed Metcher	Yamaha YZF-R6	12	+4.532	6	20
3	98	(France) Romain Lanusse	Yamaha YZF-R6	12	+9.187	17	16
4	53	(Italy) Nicola Jr. Morrentino	Yamaha YZF-R6	12	+9.992	15	13
5	52	(Belgium) Gauthier Duwelz	Yamaha YZF-R6	12	+11.601	12	11
6	64	(Italy) Riccardo Cecchini	Triumph Daytona 675	12	+43.906	28	10
7	26	(Romania) Mircea Vrajitoru	Yamaha YZF-R6	12	+59.209	24	9
8	825	(United States) Joey Pascarella	Honda CBR600RR	12	+1:01.555	18	8
9	18	(Italy) Christian Gamarino	Kawasaki ZX-6R	12	+1:10.339	3	7
10	92	(Australia) Adrian Nestorovic	Yamaha YZF-R6	12	+1:18.294	21	6
11	8	(United Kingdom) Joshua Elliott	Yamaha YZF-R6	12	+1:24.204	19	5
12	96	(Italy) Gennaro Romano	Yamaha YZF-R6	12	+1:32.214	30	4
13	69	(France) Nelson Major	Yamaha YZF-R6	12	+1:34.199	10	3
14	10	(Spain) Nacho Calero	Yamaha YZF-R6	12	+1:37.076	9	2
15	23	(Luxembourg) Christophe Ponsson	Yamaha YZF-R6	12	+1:42.051	31	1
16	77	(Italy) Stefano Casalotti	Yamaha YZF-R6	12	+1:45.604	14	
17	72	(Italy) Marco Ravaioli	Yamaha YZF-R6	12	+1:47.018	27	
18	78	(Netherlands) Tristan Lentink	Honda CBR600RR	11	+1 lap	32	
19	4	(United States) Joshua Day	Kawasaki ZX-6R	11	+1 lap	13	
Ret	56	(United States) Austin Dehaven	Yamaha YZF-R6	9	Accident	29	
Ret	99	(Netherlands) Tony Coveña	Yamaha YZF-R6	7	Accident	25	
Ret	13	(Italy) Dino Lombardi	Yamaha YZF-R6	5	Accident	2	
Ret	84	(Italy) Riccardo Russo	Yamaha YZF-R6	3	Accident	8	
Ret	17	(Italy) Luca Salvadori	Yamaha YZF-R6	2	Accident	23	
Ret	70	(Italy) Luca Vitali	Yamaha YZF-R6	2	Accident	4	
Ret	43	(France) Stéphane Egea	Yamaha YZF-R6	1	Accident	5	
Ret	12	(Italy) Franco Morbidelli	Yamaha YZF-R6	1	Accident	16	
Ret	60	(Netherlands) Michael Van Der Mark	Honda CBR600RR	1	Accident	11	
Ret	59	(Denmark) Alex Schacht	Honda CBR600RR	1	Accident	26	
Ret	71	(United Kingdom) Max Wadsworth	Yamaha YZF-R6	0	Retirement	33	
Ret	415	(Italy) Federico Dittadi	Yamaha YZF-R6	0	Accident	20	
Ret	75	(Italy) Francesco Cocco	Yamaha YZF-R6	0	Accident	7	
OFFICIAL SUPERSTOCK 600 RACE REPORT
