= Venema =

Venema is a West Frisian patronymic surname most common in the northeast Netherlands. Notable people with the surname include:

- Anneke Venema (born 1971), Dutch rower
- Melissa Venema (born 1995), Dutch trumpet player
- Nick Venema (born 1999), Dutch football forward
- Wietse Venema (born 1951), Dutch programmer and physicist
- Xander Venema (born 1985), Dutch pop singer
