= 2011 Brno Superbike World Championship round =

(Czech Republic) 2011 Brno Superbike World Championship round
Round details
- Round 8 of 13 rounds in the 2011 Superbike World Championship. and Round 7 of 12 rounds in the 2011 Supersport World Championship.
- Date: July 10, 2011
- Location: Masaryk Circuit
- Course: Permanent racing facility 5.403 km (3.357 mi)

Superbike World Championship
Pole position
(Italy) Max Biaggi
1:58.580
Fastest lap race 1	Fastest lap race 2
(Italy) Marco Melandri	(Italy) Marco Melandri
2:00.118	2:00.058

Supersport World Championship
Pole position
(France) Fabien Foret
2:03.548
Fastest lap
(United Kingdom) Gino Rea
2:04.352

The 2011 Brno Superbike World Championship round was the eighth round of the 2011 Superbike World Championship. It took place on the weekend of 8–10 July 2011 at the Masaryk Circuit, near Brno, Czech Republic. 65,000 spectators attended the three-day event. Marco Melandri won the first race and Max Biaggi won the second race, with each rider finishing second in the other race. Carlos Checa finished third in both races. It was Biaggi's eleventh race win at Brno's Masaryk Circuit. The Supersport race concluded three laps earlier than scheduled, after a crash caused by oil on the track. It was won by Gino Rea.

== Results ==
=== Superbike race 1 classification ===
Pos.	No.	Rider	Bike	Laps	Time/Retired	Grid	Points
1	33	(Italy) Marco Melandri	Yamaha YZF-R1	20	40:23.699	2	25
2	1	(Italy) Max Biaggi	Aprilia RSV4 Factory	20	+0.241	1	20
3	7	(Spain) Carlos Checa	Ducati 1098R	20	+0.436	3	16
4	84	(Italy) Michel Fabrizio	Suzuki GSX-R 1000	20	+8.448	6	13
5	58	(Republic of Ireland) Eugene Laverty	Yamaha YZF-R1	20	+11.863	4	11
6	86	(Italy) Ayrton Badovini	BMW S1000RR	20	+16.374	9	10
7	2	(United Kingdom) Leon Camier	Aprilia RSV4 Factory	20	+20.075	7	9
8	91	(United Kingdom) Leon Haslam	BMW S1000RR	20	+21.399	13	8
9	17	(Spain) Joan Lascorz	Kawasaki ZX-10R	20	+21.555	19	7
10	66	(United Kingdom) Tom Sykes	Kawasaki ZX-10R	20	+22.330	8	6
11	96	(Czech Republic) Jakub Smrž	Ducati 1098R	20	+22.494	5	5
12	41	(Japan) Noriyuki Haga	Aprilia RSV4 Factory	20	+24.710	14	4
13	121	(France) Maxime Berger	Ducati 1098R	20	+27.958	12	3
14	44	(Italy) Roberto Rolfo	Kawasaki ZX-10R	20	+31.724	18	2
15	22	(United Kingdom) Alex Lowes	Honda CBR1000RR	20	+31.998	21	1
16	8	(Australia) Mark Aitchison	Kawasaki ZX-10R	20	+34.771	11	
17	57	(Italy) Lorenzo Lanzi	BMW S1000RR	20	+36.582	15	
18	77	(Australia) Chris Vermeulen	Kawasaki ZX-10R	20	+45.690	20	
19	13	(Hungary) Viktor Kispataki	Honda CBR1000RR	20	+1:28.907	22	
20	50	(France) Sylvain Guintoli	Ducati 1098R	19	+1 lap	10	
Ret	15	(Italy) Matteo Baiocco	Ducati 1098R	12	Retirement	16	
Ret	111	(Spain) Rubén Xaus	Honda CBR1000RR	0	Accident	17	
OFFICIAL SUPERBIKE RACE 1 REPORT

=== Superbike race 2 classification ===
Pos.	No.	Rider	Bike	Laps	Time/Retired	Grid	Points
1	1	(Italy) Max Biaggi	Aprilia RSV4 Factory	20	40:21.646	1	25
2	33	(Italy) Marco Melandri	Yamaha YZF-R1	20	+0.222	2	20
3	7	(Spain) Carlos Checa	Ducati 1098R	20	+3.558	3	16
4	84	(Italy) Michel Fabrizio	Suzuki GSX-R 1000	20	+7.863	6	13
5	58	(Republic of Ireland) Eugene Laverty	Yamaha YZF-R1	20	+8.534	4	11
6	86	(Italy) Ayrton Badovini	BMW S1000RR	20	+18.085	9	10
7	91	(United Kingdom) Leon Haslam	BMW S1000RR	20	+21.650	13	9
8	17	(Spain) Joan Lascorz	Kawasaki ZX-10R	20	+21.862	18	8
9	50	(France) Sylvain Guintoli	Ducati 1098R	20	+25.306	10	7
10	41	(Japan) Noriyuki Haga	Aprilia RSV4 Factory	20	+27.366	14	6
11	44	(Italy) Roberto Rolfo	Kawasaki ZX-10R	20	+33.716	18	5
12	8	(Australia) Mark Aitchison	Kawasaki ZX-10R	20	+36.549	11	4
13	57	(Italy) Lorenzo Lanzi	BMW S1000RR	20	+37.468	15	3
14	66	(United Kingdom) Tom Sykes	Kawasaki ZX-10R	20	+46.878	8	2
15	13	(Hungary) Viktor Kispataki	Honda CBR1000RR	20	+1:38.074	21	1
Ret	121	(France) Maxime Berger	Ducati 1098R	15	Retirement	12	
Ret	2	(United Kingdom) Leon Camier	Aprilia RSV4 Factory	14	Retirement	7	
Ret	96	(Czech Republic) Jakub Smrž	Ducati 1098R	12	Accident	5	
Ret	15	(Italy) Matteo Baiocco	Ducati 1098R	9	Retirement	16	
Ret	22	(United Kingdom) Alex Lowes	Honda CBR1000RR	5	Accident	20	
DNS	77	(Australia) Chris Vermeulen	Kawasaki ZX-10R	0	Did not start	19	
DNS	111	(Spain) Rubén Xaus	Honda CBR1000RR		Did not start		
OFFICIAL SUPERBIKE RACE 2 REPORT

=== Supersport race classification ===
Pos.	No.	Rider	Bike	Laps	Time/Retired	Grid	Points
1	4	(United Kingdom) Gino Rea	Honda CBR600RR	15	31:21.642	4	25
2	99	(France) Fabien Foret	Honda CBR600RR	15	+0.448	1	20
3	7	(United Kingdom) Chaz Davies	Yamaha YZF-R6	15	+0.857	7	16
4	44	(Spain) David Salom	Kawasaki ZX-6R	15	+2.375	3	13
5	22	(Italy) Roberto Tamburini	Yamaha YZF-R6	15	+5.505	9	11
6	11	(United Kingdom) Sam Lowes	Honda CBR600RR	15	+6.890	6	10
7	9	(Italy) Luca Scassa	Yamaha YZF-R6	15	+7.721	12	9
8	77	(United Kingdom) James Ellison	Honda CBR600RR	15	+15.495	13	8
9	21	(France) Florian Marino	Honda CBR600RR	15	+16.665	11	7
10	31	(Italy) Vittorio Iannuzzo	Kawasaki ZX-6R	15	+26.381	15	6
11	91	(Italy) Danilo Dell'Omo	Triumph Daytona 675	15	+30.985	18	5
12	5	(Sweden) Alexander Lundh	Honda CBR600RR	15	+31.735	16	4
13	10	(Hungary) Imre Tóth	Honda CBR600RR	15	+33.352	21	3
14	87	(Italy) Luca Marconi	Yamaha YZF-R6	15	+33.797	25	2
15	55	(Italy) Massimo Roccoli	Kawasaki ZX-6R	15	+36.251	5	1
16	34	(South Africa) Ronan Quarmby	Triumph Daytona 675	15	+49.438	23	
17	114	(Switzerland) Roman Stamm	Honda CBR600RR	15	+49.656	22	
18	52	(Italy) Michele Conti	Honda CBR600RR	15	+1:02.815	27	
19	78	(Ukraine) Konstantin Pisarev	Honda CBR600RR	15	+1:12.672	32	
20	19	(Australia) Mitchell Pirotta	Honda CBR600RR	15	+1:19.529	33	
21	45	(Romania) Cătălin Cazacu	Honda CBR600RR	15	+1:19.912	30	
22	119	(Hungary) János Chrobák	Honda CBR600RR	15	+1:27.070	26	
23	24	(Russia) Eduard Blokhin	Yamaha YZF-R6	15	+1:41.818	36	
24	73	(Russia) Oleg Pozdneev	Yamaha YZF-R6	15	+1:52.058	37	
25	35	(Hungary) Ferenc Kurucz	Yamaha YZF-R6	15	+1:57.616	35	
Ret	127	(Denmark) Robbin Harms	Honda CBR600RR	15	(+7.986)	8	
Ret	69	(Czech Republic) Ondřej Ježek	Honda CBR600RR	15	(+25.363)	14	
Ret	117	(Portugal) Miguel Praia	Honda CBR600RR	14	Accident	10	
Ret	30	(Russia) Valery Yurchenko	Yamaha YZF-R6	8	Accident	34	
Ret	32	(Italy) Mirko Giansanti	Kawasaki ZX-6R	7	Retirement	20	
Ret	28	(Poland) Paweł Szkopek	Honda CBR600RR	4	Retirement	19	
Ret	25	(Slovenia) Marko Jerman	Triumph Daytona 675	3	Accident	28	
Ret	23	(Australia) Broc Parkes	Kawasaki ZX-6R	2	Accident	2	
Ret	17	(Czech Republic) Patrik Vostárek	Honda CBR600RR	2	Retirement	17	
Ret	33	(Austria) Yves Polzer	Yamaha YZF-R6	1	Accident	29	
Ret	60	(Ukraine) Vladimir Ivanov	Honda CBR600RR	0	Accident	24	
DNS	74	(Slovenia) Boštjan Skubic	Yamaha YZF-R6		Did not start	31	
OFFICIAL SUPERSPORT RACE REPORT

=== Superstock 1000 race classification ===
Pos.	No.	Rider	Bike	Laps	Time/Retired	Grid	Points
1	20	(France) Sylvain Barrier	BMW S1000RR	12	24:54.052	3	25
2	34	(Italy) Davide Giugliano	Ducati 1098R	12	+0.070	2	20
3	87	(Italy) Lorenzo Zanetti	BMW S1000RR	12	+0.722	7	16
4	21	(Germany) Markus Reiterberger	BMW S1000RR	12	+1.257	4	13
5	59	(Italy) Niccolò Canepa	Ducati 1098R	12	+13.181	6	11
6	15	(Italy) Fabio Massei	BMW S1000RR	12	+13.413	8	10
7	14	(Italy) Lorenzo Baroni	Ducati 1098R	12	+17.913	5	9
8	32	(South Africa) Sheridan Morais	Kawasaki ZX-10R	12	+19.058	9	8
9	8	(Italy) Andrea Antonelli	Honda CBR1000RR	12	+19.461	10	7
10	6	(Italy) Lorenzo Savadori	Kawasaki ZX-10R	12	+21.265	15	6
11	55	(Slovakia) Tomáš Svitok	Ducati 1098R	12	+22.790	19	5
12	28	(Italy) Ferruccio Lamborghini	Honda CBR1000RR	12	+25.314	14	4
13	5	(Italy) Marco Bussolotti	Kawasaki ZX-10R	12	+27.444	13	3
14	86	(Australia) Beau Beaton	BMW S1000RR	12	+27.512	12	2
15	23	(Italy) Luca Verdini	Kawasaki ZX-10R	12	+31.448	16	1
16	11	(France) Jérémy Guarnoni	Yamaha YZF-R1	12	+31.632	23	
17	36	(Argentina) Leandro Mercado	Kawasaki ZX-10R	12	+31.706	17	
18	39	(France) Randy Pagaud	BMW S1000RR	12	+33.487	20	
19	71	(Netherlands) Roy Ten Napel	Honda CBR1000RR	12	+36.395	25	
20	19	(Italy) Davide Fanelli	Honda CBR1000RR	12	+43.404	27	
21	27	(Switzerland) Thomas Caiani	Kawasaki ZX-10R	12	+54.719	26	
22	120	(Poland) Marcin Walkowiak	Honda CBR1000RR	12	+54.949	28	
23	30	(Romania) Bogdan Vrăjitoru	Yamaha YZF-R1	12	+1:35.012	29	
Ret	40	(Hungary) Alen Győrfi	Honda CBR1000RR	10	Accident	24	
Ret	16	(Czech Republic) Michal Šembera	BMW S1000RR	7	Accident	22	
Ret	47	(Italy) Eddi La Marra	Honda CBR1000RR	6	Retirement	11	
Ret	9	(Italy) Danilo Petrucci	Ducati 1098R	5	Accident	1	
Ret	67	(Australia) Bryan Staring	Kawasaki ZX-10R	2	Technical	18	
Ret	93	(France) Mathieu Lussiana	BMW S1000RR	2	Retirement	21	
DNS	96	(Italy) Jonathan Gallina	BMW S1000RR		Did not start		
DNS	83	(United Kingdom) Danny Buchan	Kawasaki ZX-10R		Did not start		
OFFICIAL SUPERSTOCK 1000 RACE REPORT

=== Superstock 600 race classification ===
Pos.	No.	Rider	Bike	Laps	Time/Retired	Grid	Points
1	13	(Italy) Dino Lombardi	Yamaha YZF-R6	10	21:27.702	1	25
2	4	(United States) Joshua Day	Kawasaki ZX-6R	10	+0.280	2	20
3	19	(Slovakia) Tomáš Krajči	Yamaha YZF-R6	10	+1.133	7	16
4	52	(Belgium) Gauthier Duwelz	Yamaha YZF-R6	10	+1.450	6	13
5	43	(France) Stéphane Egea	Yamaha YZF-R6	10	+6.653	12	11
6	60	(Netherlands) Michael Van Der Mark	Honda CBR600RR	10	+6.797	5	10
7	84	(Italy) Riccardo Russo	Yamaha YZF-R6	10	+7.292	9	9
8	10	(Spain) Nacho Calero	Yamaha YZF-R6	10	+10.117	4	8
9	75	(Italy) Francesco Cocco	Yamaha YZF-R6	10	+13.181	14	7
10	99	(Netherlands) Tony Coveña	Yamaha YZF-R6	10	+15.081	19	6
11	92	(Australia) Adrian Nestorovic	Yamaha YZF-R6	10	+15.088	17	5
12	59	(Denmark) Alex Schacht	Honda CBR600RR	10	+15.104	18	4
13	64	(Italy) Riccardo Cecchini	Triumph Daytona 675	10	+15.242	13	3
14	8	(United Kingdom) Joshua Elliott	Yamaha YZF-R6	10	+15.688	15	2
15	6	(France) Richard De Tournay	Yamaha YZF-R6	10	+21.518	22	1
16	26	(Romania) Mircea Vrajitoru	Yamaha YZF-R6	10	+23.719	20	
17	16	(Poland) Artur Wielebski	Yamaha YZF-R6	10	+24.216	23	
18	56	(United States) Austin Dehaven	Yamaha YZF-R6	10	+40.265	21	
19	44	(Australia) Matt Davies	Kawasaki ZX-6R	10	+44.678	24	
20	78	(Netherlands) Tristan Lentink	Honda CBR600RR	10	+44.754	26	
21	23	(Luxembourg) Christophe Ponsson	Yamaha YZF-R6	10	+47.466	25	
Ret	29	(Italy) Daniele Beretta	Yamaha YZF-R6	4	Retirement	16	
Ret	3	(Australia) Jed Metcher	Yamaha YZF-R6	3	Retirement	8	
Ret	98	(France) Romain Lanusse	Yamaha YZF-R6	1	Accident	11	
Ret	69	(France) Nelson Major	Yamaha YZF-R6	0	Retirement	10	
Ret	18	(Italy) Christian Gamarino	Kawasaki ZX-6R	0	Retirement	3	
OFFICIAL SUPERSTOCK 600 RACE REPORT
