= 2011 Miller Superbike World Championship round =

(United States) 2011 Miller Superbike World Championship round
Round details
- Round 5 of 13 rounds in the 2011 Superbike World Championship.
- Date: 30 May, 2011
- Location: Miller Motorsports Park
- Course: Permanent racing facility 4.907 km (3.049 mi)

Superbike World Championship
Pole position
(Spain) Carlos Checa
1:58.315
Fastest lap race 1	Fastest lap race 2
(Spain) Carlos Checa	(Spain) Carlos Checa
1:49.779	1:48.827

The 2011 Miller Superbike World Championship round was the fifth round of the 2011 Superbike World Championship. It took place on the weekend of May 28–30, 2011 at Miller Motorsports Park, in Tooele, Utah, United States. The races were held on Memorial Day Monday.

== Results ==
=== Superbike race 1 classification ===
Pos.	No.	Rider	Bike	Laps	Time/Retired	Grid	Points
1	7	(Spain) Carlos Checa	Ducati 1098R	21	38:46.915	1	25
2	96	(Czech Republic) Jakub Smrž	Ducati 1098R	21	+2.766	2	20
3	50	(France) Sylvain Guintoli	Ducati 1098R	21	+4.093	5	16
4	2	(United Kingdom) Leon Camier	Aprilia RSV4 Factory	21	+8.885	11	13
5	58	(Republic of Ireland) Eugene Laverty	Yamaha YZF R1	21	+15.718	4	11
6	66	(United Kingdom) Tom Sykes	Kawasaki ZX 10R	21	+20.477	10	10
7	86	(Italy) Ayrton Badovini	BMW S1000RR	21	+22.170	8	9
8	91	(United Kingdom) Leon Haslam	BMW S1000RR	21	+22.267	12	8
9	41	(Japan) Noriyuki Haga	Aprilia RSV4 Factory	21	+24.087	9	7
10	33	(Italy) Marco Melandri	Yamaha YZF R1	21	+27.150	3	6
11	121	(France) Maxime Berger	Ducati 1098R	21	+29.422	20	5
12	12	(Australia) Josh Waters	Suzuki GSX-R1000	21	+33.428	16	4
13	11	(Australia) Troy Corser	BMW S1000RR	21	+36.573	6	3
14	17	(Spain) Joan Lascorz	Kawasaki ZX 10R	21	+1:05.369	17	2
15	52	(United Kingdom) James Toseland	BMW S1000RR	21	+1:14.382	18	1
16	8	(Australia) Mark Aitchison	Kawasaki ZX 10R	21	+1:14.736	19	
17	44	(Italy) Roberto Rolfo	Kawasaki ZX 10R	19	+2 laps	21	
Ret	84	(Italy) Michel Fabrizio	Suzuki GSX-R1000	3	Accident	15	
Ret	111	(Spain) Rubén Xaus	Honda CBR1000RR	3	Accident	14	
Ret	4	(United Kingdom) Jonathan Rea	Honda CBR1000RR	0	Accident	13	
Ret	1	(Italy) Max Biaggi	Aprilia RSV4 Factory	0	Accident	7	
OFFICIAL SUPERBIKE RACE 1 REPORT

=== Superbike race 2 classification ===
Pos	No	Rider	Bike	Laps	Time	Grid	Points
1	7	(Spain) Carlos Checa	Ducati 1098R	21	38:22.082	1	25
2	2	(United Kingdom) Leon Camier	Aprilia RSV4 Factory	21	+7.194	11	20
3	1	(Italy) Max Biaggi	Aprilia RSV4 Factory	21	+8.734	7	16
4	58	(Republic of Ireland) Eugene Laverty	Yamaha YZF R1	21	+14.214	4	13
5	84	(Italy) Michel Fabrizio	Suzuki GSX-R1000	21	+14.750	15	11
6	33	(Italy) Marco Melandri	Yamaha YZF R1	21	+21.634	3	10
7	50	(France) Sylvain Guintoli	Ducati 1098R	21	+24.079	5	9
8	96	(Czech Republic) Jakub Smrž	Ducati 1098R	21	+25.688	2	8
9	86	(Italy) Ayrton Badovini	BMW S1000RR	21	+29.621	8	7
10	66	(United Kingdom) Tom Sykes	Kawasaki ZX 10R	21	+30.681	10	6
11	4	(United Kingdom) Jonathan Rea	Honda CBR1000RR	21	+31.033	13	5
12	17	(Spain) Joan Lascorz	Kawasaki ZX 10R	21	+37.063	17	4
13	91	(United Kingdom) Leon Haslam	BMW S1000RR	21	+37.455	12	3
14	121	(France) Maxime Berger	Ducati 1098R	21	+40.509	19	2
15	12	(Australia) Josh Waters	Suzuki GSX-R1000	21	+40.894	16	1
16	44	(Italy) Roberto Rolfo	Kawasaki ZX 10R	21	+48.989	20	
17	8	(Australia) Mark Aitchison	Kawasaki ZX 10R	21	+52.388	18	
18	111	(Spain) Rubén Xaus	Honda CBR1000RR	21	+1:18.485	14	
Ret	41	(Japan) Noriyuki Haga	Aprilia RSV4 Factory	2	Accident	9	
Ret	11	(Australia) Troy Corser	BMW S1000RR	2	Accident	6	
DNS	52	(United Kingdom) James Toseland	BMW S1000RR		Did not start		
OFFICIAL SUPERBIKE RACE 2 REPORT
