= Broc Parkes =

Australian motorcycle racer

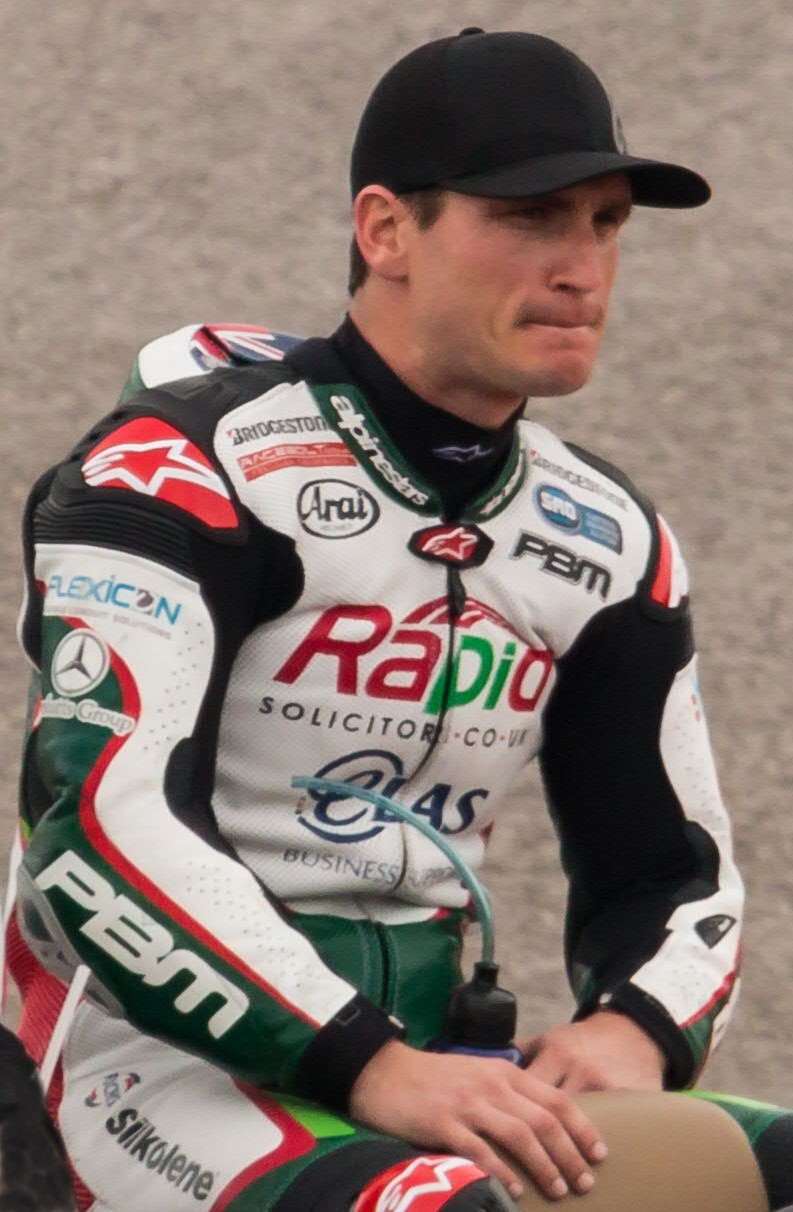
- Parkes wearing Paul Bird Motorsport colours on an open-top car parade at the 2014 Motorcycle Grand Prix of the Americas
- Nationality: Australian
- Born: 24 December 1981 (age 44); Hunter Valley, New South Wales, Australia
- Current team: Yamaha Austria Racing Team
- Bike number: 23
- Website: 23 Parkes
Motorcycle racing career statistics
MotoGP World Championship
Active years	2014–2015, 2017
Manufacturers	PBM, ART, Yamaha
Championships	0
2017 championship position	31st (0 pts)
Starts / Wins / Podiums / Poles / F. laps / Points; 19 / 0 / 0 / 0 / 0 / 9
125cc World Championship
Active years	1999
Manufacturers	Honda
Starts / Wins / Podiums / Poles / F. laps / Points; 1 / 0 / 0 / 0 / 0 / 0

Broc Parkes (born 24 December 1981) is an Australian motorcycle racer, best known for his success in the Supersport World Championship. He currently races in the Endurance FIM World Championship aboard a Yamaha YZF-R1.

During 2015, Parkes raced in British Superbikes for half the season, then competed in the Endurance FIM World Championship aboard a YART Yamaha YZF-R1, before being drafted-in to MotoGP on the ART machine for the last race of the season at Valencia, held on 8 November at the Circuit Ricardo Tormo, Spain.

== Early years ==
Born in the Hunter Valley of New South Wales, resulting in the nickname 'The Boy From the Bush', Parkes was originally inspired to race as a four-year-old, when he saw countryman Wayne Gardner winning a race. Gardner ultimately became his manager.

Parkes began racing on dirt tracks a year later, with great success. He also raced junior motorcycle speedway and finished second in the 1997 Australian Under-16 Championship in Adelaide. He then switched to circuit racing at the age of 16 – the legal limit in Australia – going on to win the Australian 125cc title and Australian 250cc Production title in 1999, on Honda machinery.

== Going International ==
Parkes then spent a season in Japan with the Moriwaki squad's Honda equipment, finishing third in the All Japan X Formula series. Parkes then moved to Europe to join the NCR Ducati team for the 2001 World Superbike Championship. He experienced a mechanical failure while running strongly in one race, but he took 16th overall. In 2002, he finished up 11th.

== Supersport World Championship ==
For 2003, Parkes moved to the Supersport World Championship for the BKM Honda team, but the team was late getting race equipment, and did not complete the year due to financial problems. He moved to the crack Ten Kate team for 2004, finishing as championship runner-up behind teammate Karl Muggeridge. For 2005, he joined Yamaha's factory team, struggling for most of the year but ending with a victory to come fifth overall. In 2006, he challenged for the title before a crash at Assen left him critically injured – although he returned before the end of the season to come third overall. He finished a distant second to Kenan Sofuoğlu in 2007, with back-to-back wins at Brands Hatch and Lausitzring despite a broken collarbone early in the season, and finished fourth in 2008 despite a series-high six poles and a season-opening victory in Losail.

== Back to World Superbikes ==
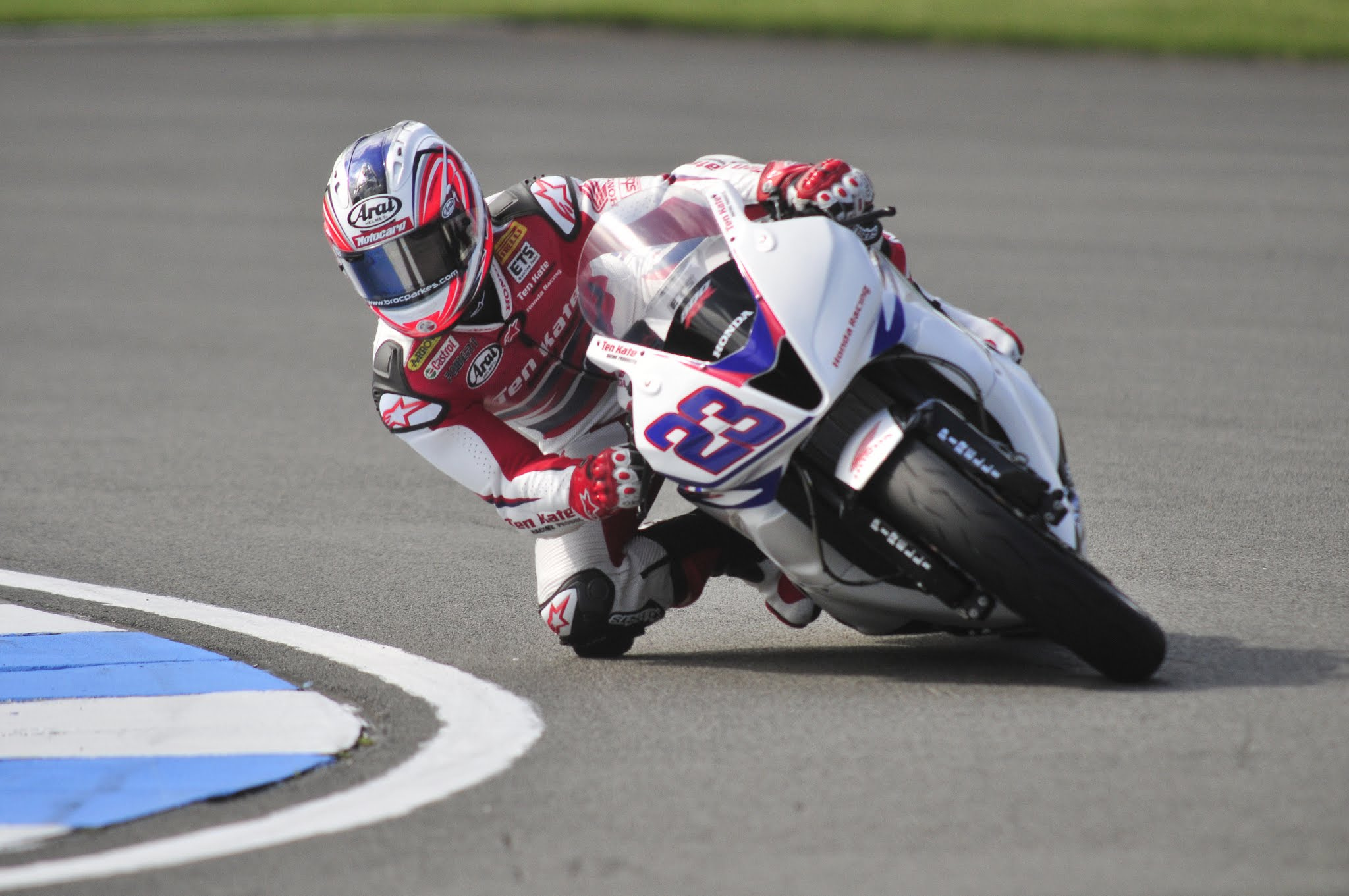
Parkes at Donington Park Supersport in 2012

For 2009, Parkes returns to World Superbike – on factory Kawasakis ran by Paul Bird Motorsport, teamed with former Grand Prix winner Makoto Tamada. His team often struggled for results, but he shone in a one-off appearance at the British Superbike Championship round at Brands Hatch. Parkes qualified second and finished second in all of the three races held there, only behind the dominant Leon Camier each time.

2010 was also a struggle for Parkes, who joined the new Echo CRS Honda team. He crashed heavily in pre-season and missed the first three rounds, and was usually a backmarker once he returned. Three races before the end of the season, Parkes announced that he separated ways with Echo CRS Honda, and he joined the Motocard Kawasaki team, as the replacement of the injured Joan Lascorz. He also raced a few races at the end of the season in World Supersports with the same team.

Parkes continued in Supersports the next two seasons riding a Kawasaki and a Honda, finishing top five both years. In 2013, Parkes returned to Australia and raced for the factory Yamaha team, winning the Australian FX-Superbike Championship.

== Move to MotoGP ==
In December 2013, it was announced that Parkes would ride for Paul Bird Motorsport alongside Michael Laverty for the 2014 MotoGP season. He effectively replaced his countryman Damian Cudlin and continued a 31-year streak of Australia's representation in the premier class of motorcycle racing.

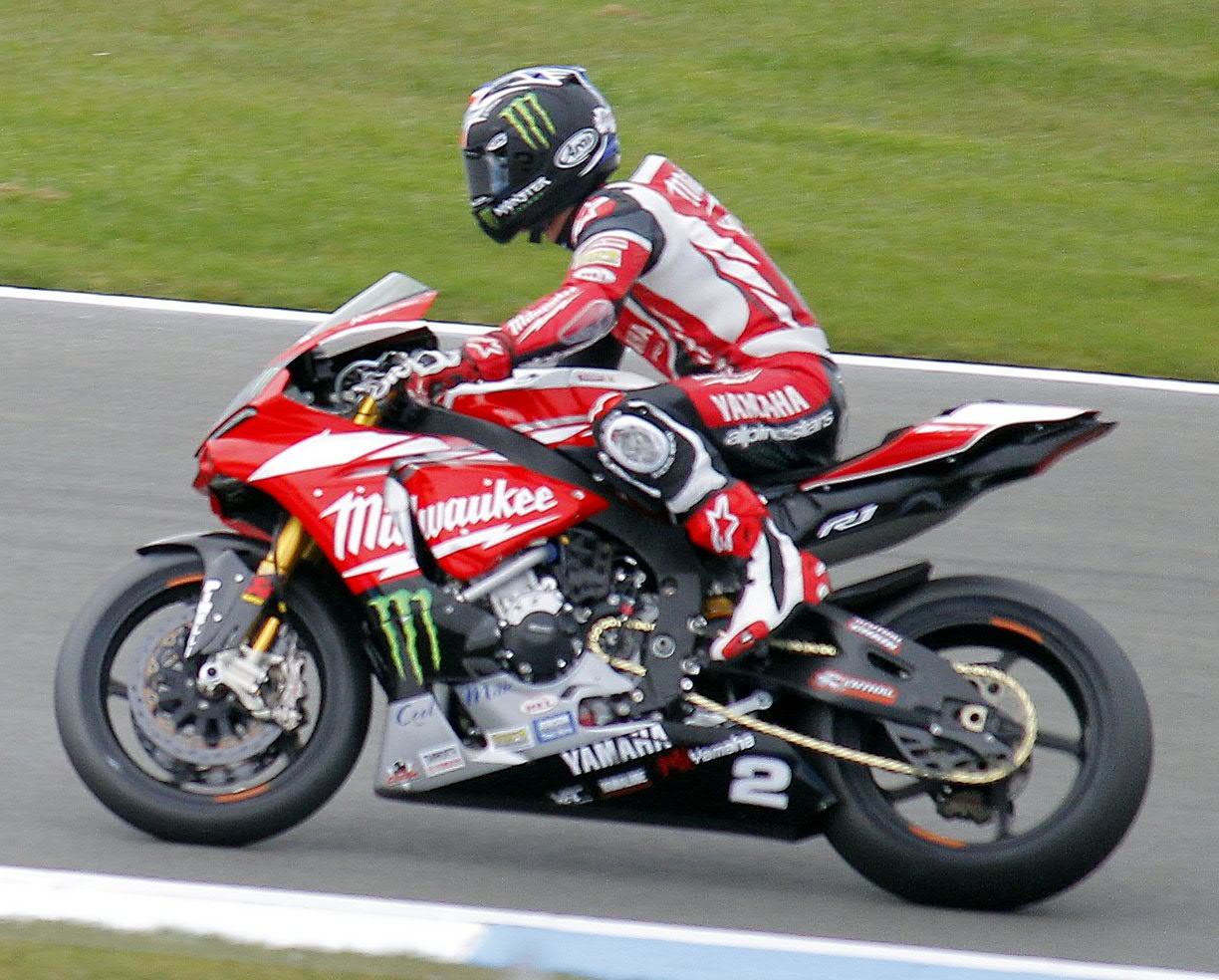
Parkes on a Milwaukee Yamaha Superbike in early 2015

== 2015 season ==
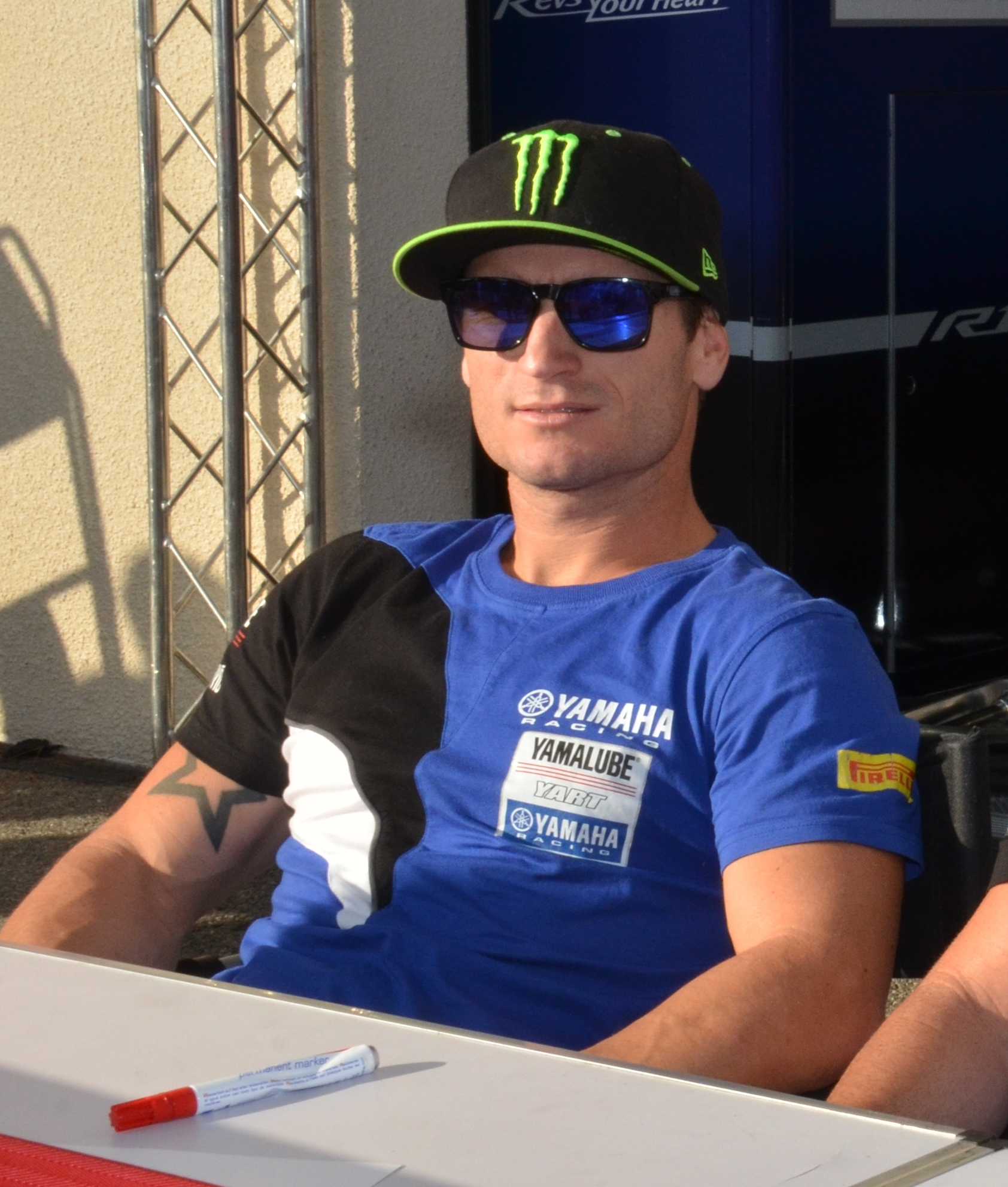
Broc Parkes in the Bol d'Or 2016

For the early part of 2015, Parkes rode for Shaun Muir Racing's Milwaukee Yamaha team in the British Superbike Championship, until he became unable to continue due to the after-effects of arm-pump surgery. Parkes then competed in Endurance FIM World Championship races on a Yamaha Austria Racing Team machine, with his final race of the season, a one-off riding for ART at Valencia, held on 8 November at the Circuit Ricardo Tormo, Spain, when he retired after completing two-thirds of the race.

== Career statistics ==
=== Grand Prix motorcycle racing ===
==== By season ====
Season	Class	Motorcycle	Team	Race	Win	Podium	Pole	FLap	Pts	Plcd
1999	125cc	Honda	Scot Walker Racing	1	0	0	0	0	0	NC
2014	MotoGP	PBM	Paul Bird Motorsport	18	0	0	0	0	9	23rd
2015	MotoGP	ART	E-Motion IodaRacing Team	1	0	0	0	0	0	NC
2017	MotoGP	Yamaha	Monster Yamaha Tech3	1	0	0	0	0	0	31st
Total				**21**	**0**	**0**	**0**	**0**	**9**	

==== Races by year ====
(key) (Races in bold indicate pole position, races in italics indicate fastest lap)

Year	Class	Bike	1	2	3	4	5	6	7	8	9	10	11	12	13	14	15	16	17	18	Pos	Pts
1999	125cc	Honda	MAL	JPN	SPA	FRA	ITA	CAT	NED	GBR	GER	CZE	IMO	VAL	AUS; 23	RSA	BRA	ARG			NC	0
2014	MotoGP	PBM	QAT; 15	AME; Ret	ARG; 21	SPA; 17	FRA; 18	ITA; 17	CAT; 16	NED; 11	GER; 21	INP; 15	CZE; 19	GBR; 21	RSM; 18	ARA; 18	JPN; 20	AUS; Ret	MAL; 14	VAL; 20	23rd	9
2015	MotoGP	ART	QAT	AME	ARG	SPA	FRA	ITA	CAT	NED	GER	INP	CZE	GBR	RSM	ARA	JPN	AUS	MAL	VAL; Ret	NC	0
2017	MotoGP	Yamaha	QAT	ARG	AME	SPA	FRA	ITA	CAT	NED	GER	CZE	AUT	GBR	RSM	ARA	JPN	AUS; 22	MAL	VAL	31st	0

=== Superbike World Championship ===
==== Races by year ====
Year	Make	1		2		3		4		5		6		7		8		9		10		11		12		13		14		Pos	Pts
Year	Make	R1	R2	R1	R2	R1	R2	R1	R2	R1	R2	R1	R2	R1	R2	R1	R2	R1	R2	R1	R2	R1	R2	R1	R2	R1	R2	R1	R2	Pos	Pts
2001	Ducati	SPA; Ret	SPA; 13	RSA; 12	RSA; 11	AUS; 5	AUS; C	JPN; 16	JPN; 17	ITA; DNS	ITA; DNS	GBR; 20	GBR; 14	GER; 14	GER; Ret	SMR; Ret	SMR; 7	USA; 13	USA; 14	EUR; DNS	EUR; DNS	GER; Ret	GER; 18	NED; 22	NED; Ret	ITA; Ret	ITA; 8			16th	49
2002	Ducati	SPA; 15	SPA; DNS	AUS; Ret	AUS; 13	RSA; 11	RSA; 14	JPN; Ret	JPN; Ret	ITA; Ret	ITA; 8	GBR; Ret	GBR; 12	GER; 11	GER; Ret	SMR; Ret	SMR; 14	USA; 15	USA; 12	GBR; Ret	GBR; 18	GER; 10	GER; 10	NED; 9	NED; 8	ITA; 9	ITA; 8			11th	77
2009	Kawasaki	AUS; Ret	AUS; 18	QAT; 14	QAT; 16	SPA; 10	SPA; 17	NED	NED	ITA; 10	ITA; 13	RSA; 15	RSA; 14	USA; Ret	USA; 11	SMR; 17	SMR; 17	GBR; 18	GBR; 14	CZE; 12	CZE; 16	GER; Ret	GER; 13	ITA; 10	ITA; 15	FRA; Ret	FRA; 15	POR; 11	POR; 12	18th	51
2010	Honda	AUS	AUS	POR	POR	SPA	SPA	NED; Ret	NED; 17	ITA; 20	ITA; 15	RSA; Ret	RSA; 18	USA; 17	USA; 15	SMR; DSQ	SMR; 17	CZE; 13	CZE; 12	GBR; Ret	GBR; Ret	GER	GER	ITA	ITA	FRA	FRA			22nd	9
2013	Yamaha	AUS	AUS	SPA	SPA	NED	NED	ITA	ITA	GBR	GBR	POR	POR	ITA	ITA	RUS	RUS	GBR	GBR	GER	GER	TUR	TUR	USA	USA	FRA	FRA	SPA; 18	SPA; 12	35th	4

=== Supersport World Championship ===
==== Races by year ====
Year	Bike	1	2	3	4	5	6	7	8	9	10	11	12	13	Pos	Pts
2003	Honda	SPA; 7	AUS; Ret	JPN; 7	ITA; 15	GER; 5	GBR; Ret	SMR; 3	GBR; 15	NED	ITA	FRA; Ret			13th	47
2004	Honda	SPA; Ret	AUS; 4	SMR; Ret	ITA; 2	GER; 2	GBR; 3	GBR; 4	NED; 4	ITA; 2	**FRA**; 2				**2nd**	**135**
2005	Yamaha	QAT; 6	AUS; 7	SPA; 6	ITA; 7	EUR; 5	SMR; 5	CZE; Ret	GBR; Ret	NED; 7	GER; 2	ITA; 5	FRA; 1		6th	125
2006	Yamaha	QAT; Ret	AUS; 3	SPA; 4	ITA; 7	EUR; 2	**SMR**; 3	CZE; 2	**GBR**; 1	NED; Ret	GER	ITA; 6	FRA; 3		4th	145
2007	Yamaha	QAT; Ret	AUS; 3	EUR; DNS	SPA; 5	NED; Ret	ITA; Ret	GBR; Ret	**SMR**; 2	CZE; 13	GBR; 1	GER; 1	ITA; 4	FRA; 2	**2nd**	**133**
2008	Yamaha	QAT; 1	AUS; Ret	SPA; 4	**NED**; 5	**ITA**; 3	**GER**; 3	**SMR**; 10	**CZE**; 4	GBR; 4	EUR; 10	**ITA**; 2	**FRA**; Ret	POR; 5	4th	150
2010	Kawasaki	AUS	POR	SPA	NED	ITA	RSA	USA	SMR	CZE	GBR	GER; 3	ITA; 4	FRA; Ret	15th	29
2011	Kawasaki	AUS; 2	EUR; 5	NED; 3	ITA; 4	SMR; 1	**SPA**; Ret	CZE; Ret	GBR; 6	GER; 7	**ITA**; 3	**FRA**; 3	POR; Ret		4th	136
2012	Honda	**AUS**; 3	ITA; 20	NED; 4	ITA; Ret	EUR; 4	SMR; 5	SPA; 4	CZE; 3	GBR; 3	RUS; 5	GER; 4	**POR**; 4	**FRA**; 27	5th	135

=== British Superbike Championship ===
==== By year ====
(key) (Races in bold indicate pole position; races in italics indicate fastest lap)

Year	Make	1			2			3			4			5			6			7			8			9			10			11			12			Pos	Pts
Year	Make	R1	R2	R3	R1	R2	R3	R1	R2	R3	R1	R2	R3	R1	R2	R3	R1	R2	R3	R1	R2	R3	R1	R2	R3	R1	R2	R3	R1	R2	R3	R1	R2	R3	R1	R2	R3	Pos	Pts
2009	Kawasaki	BHI	BHI		OUL	OUL		DON	DON		THR	THR		SNE	SNE		KNO	KNO		MAL	MAL		BHGP; 2	BHGP; 2	BHGP; 2	CAD	CAD		CRO	CRO		SIL	SIL		OUL	OUL	OUL	**17th**	**60**
2011	Kawasaki	BHI	BHI		OUL	OUL		CRO	CRO		THR	THR		KNO	KNO		SNE	SNE		OUL	OUL; C		BHGP; 18	BHGP; 13	BHGP; 12	CAD	CAD	CAD	DON	DON		SIL	SIL		BHGP	BHGP	BHGP	31st	7

(key) (Races in bold indicate pole position; races in italics indicate fastest lap)

Year	Make	1		2		3			4		5		6			7		8			9			10		11		12			Pos	Pts
Year	Make	R1	R2	R1	R2	R1	R2	R3	R1	R2	R1	R2	R1	R2	R3	R1	R2	R1	R2	R3	R1	R2	R3	R1	R2	R1	R2	R1	R2	R3	Pos	Pts
2015	Yamaha	DON; 16	DON; Ret	BHI; 8	BHI; 11	OUL; Ret	OUL; 22		SNE; 11	SNE; 11	KNO; 14	KNO; 14	BHGP; 11	BHGP; 10		THR; DNS	THR; DNS	CAD	CAD		OUL	OUL	OUL	ASS	ASS	SIL	SIL	BHGP	BHGP	BHGP	21st	38
2016	Yamaha	SIL	SIL	OUL	OUL	BHI	BHI		KNO	KNO	SNE; Ret	SNE; Ret	THR	THR		BHGP; 6	BHGP; 13	CAD	CAD		OUL; 14	OUL; 14	OUL; 10	DON	DON	ASS; 9	ASS; 9	BHGP; DNS	BHGP; 14	BHGP; 10	19th	45

=== FIM Endurance World Championship ===
==== By team ====
Year	Team	Bike	Rider	TC
2013	Yamaha Austria Racing Team	Yamaha YZF-R1	(Australia) Broc Parkes (Slovenia) Igor Jerman (South Africa) Sheridan Morais (Australia) Josh Waters (Japan) Katsuyuki Nakasuga (United States) Josh Hayes	5th
2014	Yamaha Austria Racing Team	Yamaha YZF-R1	(Australia) Broc Parkes (United Kingdom) Michael Laverty (Slovenia) Igor Jerman (South Africa) Sheridan Morais (Australia) Ricky Olson (Australia) Wayne Maxwell (United Kingdom) Tommy Bridewell	6th
2015	Yamaha Austria Racing Team	Yamaha YZF-R1	(Australia) Broc Parkes (Germany) Max Neukirchner (Spain) Iván Silva (South Africa) Sheridan Morais	10th
2016	Yamaha Austria Racing Team	Yamaha YZF-R1	(Australia) Broc Parkes (Germany) Max Neukirchner (Spain) Iván Silva (Germany) Marvin Fritz (Japan) Kohta Nozane (Japan) Takuya Fujita (South Africa) Sheridan Morais	6th
2016–17	Yamaha Austria Racing Team	Yamaha YZF-R1	(Australia) Broc Parkes (Spain) Iván Silva (Germany) Marvin Fritz (Japan) Kohta Nozane	3rd
2017	Yamaha Austria Racing Team	Yamaha YZF-R1	(United States) Josh Hayes (Australia) Broc Parkes (Spain) Iván Silva (Japan) Kohta Nozane (South Africa) Sheridan Morais	3rd
2017–18	Yamaha Austria Racing Team	Yamaha YZF-R1	(Germany) Marvin Fritz (Germany) Max Neukirchner (Australia) Broc Parkes (Japan) Takuya Fujita (Japan) Kohta Nozane	16th
2019–20	Yamaha Austria Racing Team	Yamaha YZF-R1	(Germany) Marvin Fritz (Italy) Niccolò Canepa (Australia) Broc Parkes (Czech Republic) Karel Hanika (France) Loris Baz	2nd
