= 2008 Portimão Superbike World Championship round =

(Portugal) 2008 Portimão Superbike World Championship round
Round details
- Round 14 of 14 rounds in the 2008 Superbike World Championship. and Round 13 of 13 rounds in the 2008 Supersport World Championship.
- Date: November 2, 2008
- Location: Portimão, Autódromo Internacional do Algarve
- Course: Permanent racing facility 4.592 km (2.853 mi)

Superbike World Championship
Pole position
(Australia) Troy Bayliss
1:58.548
Fastest lap race 1	Fastest lap race 2
(Australia) Troy Bayliss	(Australia) Troy Bayliss
1:44.776	1:43.787

Supersport World Championship
Pole position
(Turkey) Kenan Sofuoğlu
1:45.156
Fastest lap
(Turkey) Kenan Sofuoğlu
1:46.082

The 2008 Portimão Superbike World Championship round was the last round of the 2008 Superbike World Championship season. It took place on the weekend of October 31-November 2, 2008, at the Autódromo Internacional do Algarve.

== Superbike race 1 classification ==
Pos	No	Rider	Bike	Laps	Time	Grid	Points
1	21	(Australia) Troy Bayliss	Ducati 1098 F08	22	38:48.373	1	25
2	7	(Spain) Carlos Checa	Honda CBR1000RR	22	+2.207	11	20
3	11	(Australia) Troy Corser	Yamaha YZF-R1	22	+6.972	7	16
4	65	(United Kingdom) Jonathan Rea	Honda CBR1000RR	22	+15.228	3	13
5	10	(Spain) Fonsi Nieto	Suzuki GSX-R1000	22	+16.126	16	11
6	36	(Spain) Gregorio Lavilla	Honda CBR1000RR	22	+18.152	17	10
7	91	(United Kingdom) Leon Haslam	Honda CBR1000RR	22	+18.939	6	9
8	23	(Japan) Ryuichi Kiyonari	Honda CBR1000RR	22	+20.942	19	8
9	111	(Spain) Rubén Xaus	Ducati 1098 RS 08	22	+32.018	8	7
10	55	(France) Régis Laconi	Kawasaki ZX-10R	22	+32.871	9	6
11	86	(Italy) Ayrton Badovini	Kawasaki ZX-10R	22	+36.778	14	5
12	44	(Italy) Roberto Rolfo	Honda CBR1000RR	22	+36.848	20	4
13	38	(Japan) Shinichi Nakatomi	Yamaha YZF-R1	22	+41.667	22	3
14	31	(Australia) Karl Muggeridge	Honda CBR1000RR	22	+41.806	21	2
15	34	(Japan) Yukio Kagayama	Suzuki GSX-R1000	22	+48.337	13	1
16	194	(France) Sébastien Gimbert	Yamaha YZF-R1	22	+50.295	18	
17	9	(United Kingdom) Chris Walker	Honda CBR1000RR	22	+50.840	28	
18	88	(Japan) Shuhei Aoyama	Honda CBR1000RR	22	+1:05.928	24	
19	100	(Japan) Makoto Tamada	Kawasaki ZX-10R	22	+1:06.813	26	
20	94	(Spain) David Checa	Yamaha YZF-R1	22	+1:07.007	23	
21	14	(Portugal) Luís Carreira	Suzuki GSX-R1000 K8	21	+1 Lap	29	
Ret	35	(United Kingdom) Cal Crutchlow	Honda CBR1000RR	18	Retirement	2	
Ret	41	(Japan) Noriyuki Haga	Yamaha YZF-R1	17	Retirement	10	
Ret	96	(Czech Republic) Jakub Smrž	Ducati 1098 RS 08	14	Accident	12	
Ret	18	(United Kingdom) Tommy Bridewell	Suzuki GSX-R1000 K8	12	Retirement	25	
Ret	99	(Italy) Luca Scassa	Honda CBR1000RR	10	Retirement	30	
Ret	73	(Austria) Christian Zaiser	Yamaha YZF-R1	9	Retirement	31	
Ret	13	(Italy) Vittorio Iannuzzo	Kawasaki ZX-10R	7	Retirement	27	
Ret	76	(Germany) Max Neukirchner	Suzuki GSX-R1000	5	Accident	15	
Ret	84	(Italy) Michel Fabrizio	Ducati 1098 F08	0	Accident	5	
Ret	3	(Italy) Max Biaggi	Ducati 1098 RS 08	0	Accident	4	

== Superbike race 2 classification ==
Pos	No	Rider	Bike	Laps	Time	Grid	Points
1	21	(Australia) Troy Bayliss	Ducati 1098 F08	22	38:26.125	1	25
2	84	(Italy) Michel Fabrizio	Ducati 1098 F08	22	+3.638	5	20
3	91	(United Kingdom) Leon Haslam	Honda CBR1000RR	22	+4.356	6	16
4	76	(Germany) Max Neukirchner	Suzuki GSX-R1000	22	+4.983	15	13
5	10	(Spain) Fonsi Nieto	Suzuki GSX-R1000	22	+6.775	16	11
6	11	(Australia) Troy Corser	Yamaha YZF-R1	22	+7.403	7	10
7	7	(Spain) Carlos Checa	Honda CBR1000RR	22	+7.578	11	9
8	36	(Spain) Gregorio Lavilla	Honda CBR1000RR	22	+16.113	17	8
9	35	(United Kingdom) Cal Crutchlow	Honda CBR1000RR	22	+16.284	2	7
10	55	(France) Régis Laconi	Kawasaki ZX-10R	22	+16.446	9	6
11	23	(Japan) Ryuichi Kiyonari	Honda CBR1000RR	22	+21.633	19	5
12	96	(Czech Republic) Jakub Smrž	Ducati 1098 RS 08	22	+22.098	12	4
13	3	(Italy) Max Biaggi	Ducati 1098 RS 08	22	+24.089	4	3
14	41	(Japan) Noriyuki Haga	Yamaha YZF-R1	22	+24.117	10	2
15	65	(United Kingdom) Jonathan Rea	Honda CBR1000RR	22	+31.003	3	1
16	86	(Italy) Ayrton Badovini	Kawasaki ZX-10R	22	+31.136	14	
17	38	(Japan) Shinichi Nakatomi	Yamaha YZF-R1	22	+31.330	22	
18	44	(Italy) Roberto Rolfo	Honda CBR1000RR	22	+32.272	20	
19	9	(United Kingdom) Chris Walker	Honda CBR1000RR	22	+34.049	28	
20	194	(France) Sébastien Gimbert	Yamaha YZF-R1	22	+35.028	18	
21	31	(Australia) Karl Muggeridge	Honda CBR1000RR	22	+41.669	21	
22	94	(Spain) David Checa	Yamaha YZF-R1	22	+44.889	23	
23	34	(Japan) Yukio Kagayama	Suzuki GSX-R1000	22	+47.366	13	
24	100	(Japan) Makoto Tamada	Kawasaki ZX-10R	22	+48.733	26	
25	18	(United Kingdom) Tommy Bridewell	Suzuki GSX-R1000	22	1:07.702	25	
26	88	(Japan) Shuhei Aoyama	Honda CBR1000RR	22	+1:14.242	24	
27	99	(Italy) Luca Scassa	Honda CBR1000RR	22	+1:34.781	30	
28	14	(Portugal) Luís Carreira	Suzuki GSX-R1000 K8	22	+1:37.326	29	
29	73	(Austria) Christian Zaiser	Yamaha YZF-R1	21	+1 Lap	31	
Ret	13	(Italy) Vittorio Iannuzzo	Kawasaki ZX-10R	10	Retirement	27	
Ret	111	(Spain) Rubén Xaus	Ducati 1098 RS 08	9	Accident	8	

== Supersport race classification ==
Pos	No	Rider	Bike	Laps	Time	Grid	Points
1	54	(Turkey) Kenan Sofuoğlu	Honda CBR600RR	20	35:39.851	1	25
2	88	(Australia) Andrew Pitt	Honda CBR600RR	20	+3.844	4	20
3	26	(Spain) Joan Lascorz	Honda CBR600RR	20	+7.403	6	16
4	41	(United States) Josh Hayes	Honda CBR600RR	20	+7.445	8	13
5	23	(Australia) Broc Parkes	Yamaha YZF-R6	20	+17.271	2	11
6	69	(Italy) Gianluca Nannelli	Honda CBR600RR	20	+17.297	5	10
7	116	(Italy) Simone Sanna	Honda CBR600RR	20	+25.803	15	9
8	105	(Italy) Gianluca Vizziello	Honda CBR600RR	20	+29.749	10	8
9	8	(Australia) Mark Aitchison	Triumph 675	20	+29.960	11	7
10	99	(France) Fabien Foret	Yamaha YZF-R6	20	+30.155	16	6
11	25	(Australia) Josh Brookes	Honda CBR600RR	20	+30.697	7	5
12	17	(Portugal) Miguel Praia	Honda CBR600RR	20	+30.719	18	4
13	24	(Australia) Garry McCoy	Triumph 675	20	+40.033	20	3
14	11	(Australia) Russell Holland	Honda CBR600RR	20	+40.839	12	2
15	83	(Belgium) Didier van Keymeulen	Suzuki GSX-R600	20	+44.266	17	1
16	44	(Spain) David Salom	Yamaha YZF-R6	20	+45.672	14	
17	30	(Germany) Jesco Günther	Honda CBR600RR	20	+46.765	23	
18	122	(Spain) Iván Silva	Yamaha YZF-R6	20	+51.205	21	
19	34	(Hungary) Balázs Németh	Honda CBR600RR	20	+51.626	22	
20	7	(Czech Republic) Patrik Vostárek	Honda CBR600RR	20	+57.092	26	
21	47	(Italy) Ivan Clementi	Triumph 675	20	+57.584	25	
22	21	(Japan) Katsuaki Fujiwara	Kawasaki ZX-6R	20	+1:04.848	24	
23	51	(Spain) Santiago Barragán	Honda CBR600RR	20	+1:26.940	30	
24	126	(United Kingdom) Chris Martin	Kawasaki ZX-6R	20	+1:27.010	28	
25	155	(Portugal) Tiago Dias	Yamaha YZF-R6	19	+1 Lap	31	
26	20	(Portugal) Hélder Silva	Honda CBR600RR	19	+1 Lap	32	
Ret	240	(Spain) Arturo Tizón	Suzuki GSX-R600	12	Accident	27	
Ret	127	(Denmark) Robbin Harms	Honda CBR600RR	10	Accident	13	
Ret	77	(Netherlands) Barry Veneman	Suzuki GSX-R600	9	Accident	3	
Ret	55	(Italy) Massimo Roccoli	Yamaha YZF-R6	7	Retirement	19	
Ret	14	(France) Matthieu Lagrive	Honda CBR600RR	5	Accident	9	
Ret	117	(Italy) Denis Sacchetti	Honda CBR600RR	4	Retirement	29	

== Superstock 1000 race classification ==
Pos	No	Rider	Bike	Laps	Time	Grid	Points
1	155	(Australia) Brendan Roberts	Ducati 1098R	12	22:23.040	1	25
2	23	(Australia) Chris Seaton	Suzuki GSX-R1000 K8	12	+2.995	2	20
3	21	(France) Maxime Berger	Honda CBR1000RR	12	+3.938	7	16
4	51	(Italy) Michele Pirro	Yamaha YZF-R1	12	+4.773	3	13
5	96	(Czech Republic) Matěj Smrž	Honda CBR1000RR	12	+17.166	4	11
6	53	(Italy) Alessandro Polita	Ducati 1098R	12	+17.482	18	10
7	20	(France) Sylvain Barrier	Yamaha YZF-R1	12	+19.452	10	9
8	71	(Italy) Claudio Corti	Yamaha YZF-R1	12	+19.878	21	8
9	78	(France) Freddy Foray	Suzuki GSX-R1000 K8	12	+22.892	9	7
10	77	(United Kingdom) Barry Burrell	Honda CBR1000RR	12	+23.050	13	6
11	19	(Belgium) Xavier Simeon	Suzuki GSX-R1000 K8	12	+31.698	5	5
12	73	(Italy) Simone Saltarelli	Suzuki GSX-R1000 K8	12	+32.952	8	4
13	74	(France) Julien Millet	Yamaha YZF-R1	12	+35.502	22	3
14	14	(Sweden) Filip Backlund	Suzuki GSX-R1000 K8	12	+37.798	25	2
15	113	(South Africa) Sheridan Morais	Kawasaki ZX-10R	12	+42.098	15	1
16	88	(France) Kenny Foray	Yamaha YZF-R1	12	+45.953	11	
17	7	(Austria) René Mähr	KTM 1190 RC8	12	+1:00.432	19	
18	69	(Czech Republic) Ondrej Ježek	Honda CBR1000RR	12	+1:00.595	16	
19	24	(Slovenia) Marko Jerman	Honda CBR1000RR	12	+1:02.708	27	
20	5	(Netherlands) Danny De Boer	Suzuki GSX-R1000 K8	12	+1:04.134	26	
21	66	(Netherlands) Branko Srdanov	Yamaha YZF-R1	12	+1:05.601	24	
22	87	(Australia) Gareth Jones	Suzuki GSX-R1000 K8	12	+1:12.642	29	
23	18	(United Kingdom) Matt Bond	Suzuki GSX-R1000 K8	12	+1:12.690	30	
24	30	(Switzerland) Michaël Savary	Suzuki GSX-R1000 K8	12	+1:12.821	20	
25	107	(Italy) Niccolò Rosso	Honda CBR1000RR	12	+1:18.918	41	
26	86	(Netherlands) Lennart Van Houwelingen	Yamaha YZF-R1	12	+1:23.809	36	
27	90	(Czech Republic) Michal Drobný	Honda CBR1000RR	12	+1:24.144	33	
28	92	(Slovenia) Jure Stibilj	Honda CBR1000RR	12	+1:26.189	38	
29	99	(Netherlands) Roy Ten Napel	Suzuki GSX-R1000 K8	12	+1:28.272	14	
30	81	(Finland) Pauli Pekkanen	KTM 1190 RC8	12	+1:28.903	28	
31	41	(Switzerland) Gregory Junod	Yamaha YZF-R1	12	+1:28.989	32	
32	154	(Italy) Tommaso Lorenzetti	Suzuki GSX-R1000 K8	12	+1:32.965	34	
33	13	(Italy) Vittorio Bortone	Kawasaki ZX-10R	12	+1:41.068	37	
DSQ	8	(Italy) Andrea Antonelli	Yamaha YZF-R1	12	(+17.570)	17	
Ret	34	(Italy) Davide Giugliano	Suzuki GSX-R1000 K8	11	Retirement	6	
Ret	89	(Italy) Domenico Colucci	Ducati 1098R	8	Accident	12	
Ret	60	(United Kingdom) Peter Hickman	Yamaha YZF-R1	7	Retirement	31	
Ret	15	(Italy) Matteo Baiocco	Kawasaki ZX-10R	5	Accident	35	
Ret	119	(Italy) Michele Magnoni	Yamaha YZF-R1	4	Retirement	23	
Ret	26	(Italy) Andrea Liberini	Suzuki GSX-R1000 K8	2	Retirement	39	
Ret	11	(Spain) Javier Oliver	Yamaha YZF-R1	0	Retirement	40	

== Superstock 600 race classification ==
Pos	No	Rider	Bike	Laps	Time	Grid	Points
1	44	(United Kingdom) Gino Rea	Yamaha YZF-R6	10	18:18.478	1	25
2	65	(France) Loris Baz	Yamaha YZF-R6	10	+0.060	4	20
3	5	(Italy) Marco Bussolotti	Yamaha YZF-R6	10	+3.161	5	16
4	55	(Belgium) Vincent Lonbois	Suzuki GSX-R600	10	+3.819	7	13
5	64	(United States) Josh Day	Honda CBR600RR	10	+10.038	8	11
6	24	(Italy) Daniele Beretta	Suzuki GSX-R600	10	+12.283	11	10
7	119	(Italy) Danilo Petrucci	Yamaha YZF-R6	10	+14.822	9	9
8	34	(Italy) Fabio Massei	Honda CBR600RR	10	+15.215	6	8
9	93	(France) Mathieu Lussiana	Yamaha YZF-R6	10	+16.046	13	7
10	11	(France) Jérémy Guarnoni	Yamaha YZF-R6	10	+16.416	10	6
11	45	(United Kingdom) Dan Linfoot	Yamaha YZF-R6	10	+24.940	3	5
12	73	(Netherlands) Joey Litjens	Yamaha YZF-R6	10	+25.267	19	4
13	57	(Denmark) Kenny Tirsgaard	Suzuki GSX-R600	10	+26.040	18	3
14	94	(France) Mathieu Gines	Yamaha YZF-R6	10	+27.131	2	2
15	72	(Norway) Fredrik Karlsen	Yamaha YZF-R6	10	+30.629	23	1
16	42	(Italy) Leonardo Biliotti	Honda CBR600RR	10	+31.394	20	
17	117	(Portugal) André Carvalho	Yamaha YZF-R6	10	+32.626	14	
18	63	(Republic of Ireland) BJ Toal	Honda CBR600RR	10	+32.677	21	
19	88	(Spain) Yannick Guerra	Yamaha YZF-R6	10	+32.969	17	
20	7	(Italy) Renato Costantini	Yamaha YZF-R6	10	+42.691	22	
21	23	(Switzerland) Christian Von Gunten	Suzuki GSX-R600	10	+46.860	24	
22	15	(Netherlands) Hugo Van Den Berg	Honda CBR600RR	10	+49.356	28	
23	18	(France) Nicolas Pouhair	Yamaha YZF-R6	10	+50.016	26	
24	47	(Italy) Eddi La Marra	Suzuki GSX-R600	10	+50.051	27	
25	91	(Sweden) Hampus Johansson	Yamaha YZF-R6	10	+51.441	25	
26	99	(United Kingdom) Gregg Black	Yamaha YZF-R6	10	+57.821	15	
27	10	(Spain) Nacho Calero	Yamaha YZF-R6	10	+1:09.962	29	
28	12	(United Kingdom) Sam Lowes	Honda CBR600RR	10	+1:12.333	12	
29	66	(Poland) Mateusz Stoklosa	Honda CBR600RR	10	+1:19.413	30	
DSQ	141	(Portugal) Sérgio Batista	Honda CBR600RR	10	(+29.978)	16	
