= Max Neukirchner =

German motorcycle racer

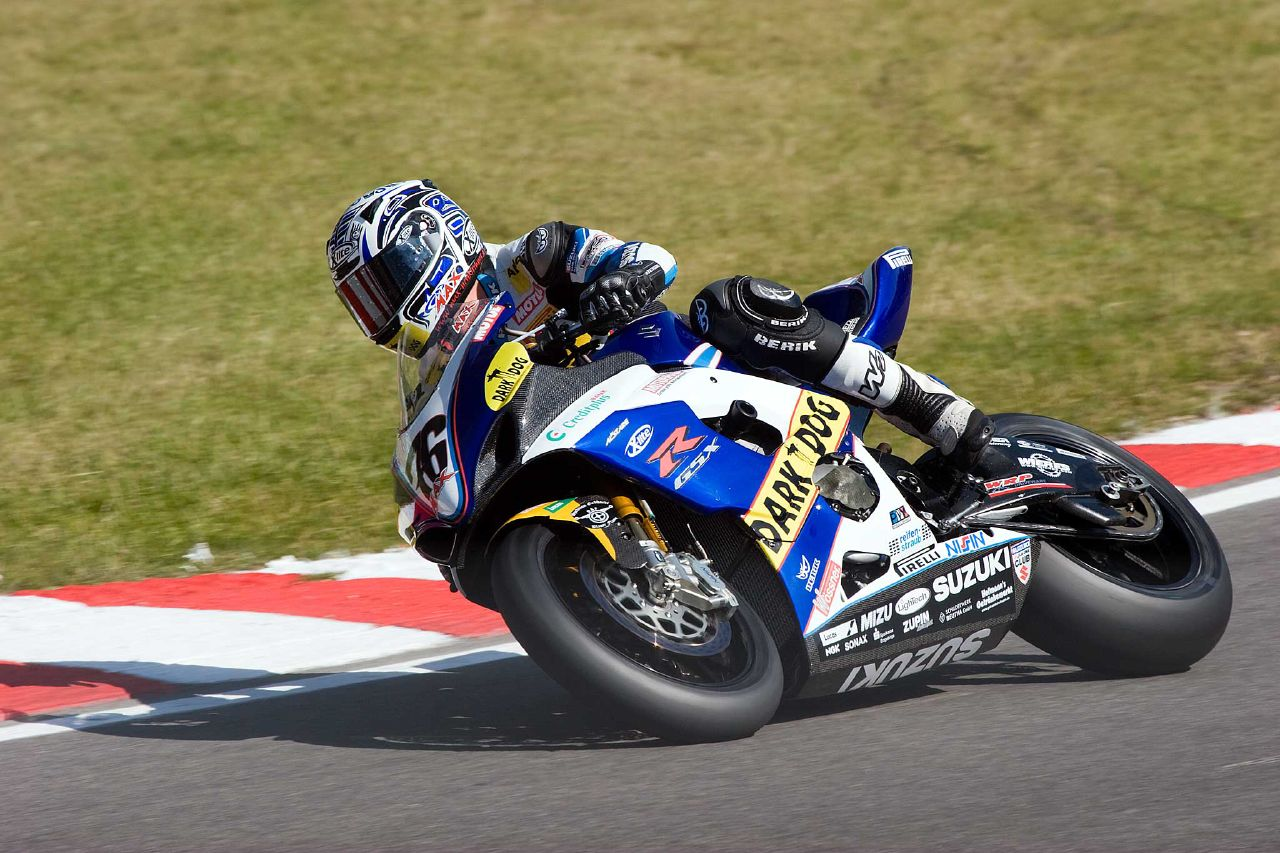
- Max Neukirchner
- Nationality: German
- Born: 20 April 1983 (age 43); Stollberg, Bezirk Karl-Marx-Stadt, East Germany
- Current team: YART Yamaha Official EWC Team
- Bike number: 7
- Website: max-neukirchner.de
Motorcycle racing career statistics
Moto2 World Championship
Active years	2011–2012
Manufacturers	MZ-RE-Honda, Kalex-Honda
Championships	0
2012 championship position	26th (9 pts)
Starts / Wins / Podiums / Poles / F. laps / Points; 26 / 0 / 0 / 0 / 0 / 51
250cc World Championship
Active years	2001–2003,
Manufacturers	Honda
Championships	0
2003 championship position	31st (1 pt)
Starts / Wins / Podiums / Poles / F. laps / Points; 3 / 0 / 0 / 0 / 0 / 1
Superbike World Championship
Active years	2005–2010, 2013–2014
Manufacturers	Honda, Ducati, Suzuki
Championships	0
2014 championship position	23rd (17 pts)
Starts / Wins / Podiums / Poles / F. laps / Points; 150 / 2 / 10 / 2 / 2 / 848

Max Neukirchner (born 20 April 1983 in Stollberg, East Germany) is a professional motorcycle racer currently competing in the Endurance FIM World Championship aboard a Yamaha YZF-R1.

== Career ==
=== Supersport & Superbike World Championship ===
In 2004, Neukirchner competed in the Supersport World Championship riding for Klaffi Honda, finishing the season ranked ninth with 63 points.

For 2005, Neukirchner, along with the Klaffi Honda team, moved to the Superbike World Championship. He got a third place podium finish at Phillip Island (but broke his hand at the next round in Valencia ) and finished the season 12th with 123 points.

Neukirchner looked set to remain with Klaffi Honda in 2006 but the ride eventually went to Alex Barros. Klaffi wasn't able to find the money to run a second bike for Neukirchner and he was left without a ride. He joined Pedercini Ducati but after a poor first half of the season Neukirchner and Pedercini announced their split. Neukirchner went on to replace Fabien Foret at Alstare Eng. Corona Extra. He finished the season 18th with 28 points.

For 2007, Neukirchner rode for Suzuki Germany and finished the season ranked ninth overall. The team used the 2006-spec works Suzuki GSX-R1000 K6.

For 2008, Neukirchner rode a 2007-spec Suzuki GSX-R1000 motorcycle for Team Alstare Suzuki. At Valencia he took his first career pole , and lead until the final corner, where he was hit by Carlos Checa, Neukirchner breaking his collarbone. On 27 April 2008 at Assen, he achieved his second World Superbike podium finish, finishing behind Troy Bayliss and Checa in the first race..

Neukirchner took his maiden victory (and the first for a German rider) in the first race at Monza, his 70th race in SBK. He won by just 0.058 seconds from Noriyuki Haga. In race 2, he achieved another podium, finishing second to Haga, missing out on victory by 0.009 seconds in a three-way blanket finish. At Miller Motorsport Park he was helped to learn the fastest line through the early part of the track by video of Suzuki's AMA Superbike champion Ben Spies . He did not score another podium that season, but consistent points finishes including four further fourth places allowed him to finish as the top Suzuki in 5th overall.

At Monza, Neukirchner suffered a broken femur in a first-corner crash for which he was blameless.

Although Suzuki Alstare announced in May that Neukirchner would remain with the team for 2009 and 2010 , doubts later surfaced over his future with the team. On 12 October 2009, Suzuki Alstare announced that they would not be offering Neukirchner a contract extension for the 2010 championship after he failed to provide medical evidence that he was fit to race.

On 14 October 2009, it was confirmed that Neukirchner would race for the HANNspree Ten Kate Honda team for the 2010 season.

=== Moto2 World Championship ===
For the 2011 season, Neukirchner rode for the MZ Racing Team with a 2010 FTR chassis at the Moto2 World Championship under the technical direction of the Italian company Pro Ride Motorsports (www.proridegp.com).

For the 2012 season, Neukirchner was riding for the Kiefer Racing Team with a Kalex chassis at the Moto2 World Championship, but left the series after sustained injury in Brno. Neukirchner achieved his best result and his only point scoring finish of the year at Le Mans with seventh place.

== Career highlights ==
2003- 9th, IDM Supersport Championship #7 Honda CBR600RR
2004- 9th, Supersport World Championship #76 Honda CBR600RR
2005- 12th, Superbike World Championship #76 Ducati 999R
2006- 18th, Superbike World Championship #76 Ducati 999R / Suzuki GSX-R1000
2007- 9th, Superbike World Championship #76 Suzuki GSX-R1000
2008- 5th, Superbike World Championship #76 Suzuki GSX-R1000
2009- 16th, Superbike World Championship #76 Suzuki GSX-R1000
2010- 18th, Superbike World Championship #76 Honda CBR1000RR
2011- 20th, Moto2 World Championship #76 MZ-RE Honda
2012- 26th, Moto2 World Championship #76 Kalex
2013- 14th, Superbike World Championship #27 Ducati 1199 Panigale
2014- 2nd, IDM Superbike Championship #76 Ducati 1199 Panigale
2015- 6th, IDM Superbike Championship #76 Yamaha YZF-R1
2016- 7th, IDM Superbike Championship #76 / 6th, Endurance FIM World Championship #7 Yamaha YZF-R1
2017- Endurance FIM World Championship #7 Yamaha YZF-R1

== Career statistics ==
=== Grand Prix motorcycle racing ===
==== By season ====
Season	Class	Motorcycle	Team	Number	Race	Win	Podium	Pole	FLap	Pts	Plcd
2011	Moto2	MZ-RE-Honda	MZ Racing Team	76	16	0	0	0	0	42	20th
2012	Moto2	Kalex-Honda	Kiefer Racing	76	10	0	0	0	0	9	26th
Total					**26**	**0**	**0**	**0**	**0**	**51**	

=== By class ===
Class	Seasons	1st GP	1st Pod	1st Win	Race	Win	Podiums	Pole	FLap	Pts	WChmp
Moto2	2011–2012	2011 Qatar			26	0	0	0	0	51	0

=== Grand Prix motorcycle racing ===
==== Races by year ====
(key) (Races in bold indicate pole position) (Races in italics indicate fastest lap)

Year	Class	Bike	1	2	3	4	5	6	7	8	9	10	11	12	13	14	15	16	17	Pos.	Pts
2001	250cc	Honda	JPN	RSA	SPA	FRA	ITA	CAT	NED	GBR	GER; 18	CZE	POR	VAL	PAC	AUS	MAL	BRA		NC	0
2002	250cc	Honda	JPN	RSA	SPA	FRA	ITA	CAT	NED	GBR	GER; 19	CZE	POR	BRA	PAC	MAL	AUS	VAL		NC	0
2003	250cc	Honda	JPN	RSA	SPA	FRA	ITA	CAT	NED	GBR	GER; 15	CZE	POR	BRA	PAC	MAL	AUS	VAL		31st	1
2011	Moto2	MZ-RE-Honda	QAT; 15	SPA; 10	POR; DNS	FRA; 15	CAT; 10	GBR; 12	NED; 10	ITA; 8	GER; Ret	CZE; Ret	INP; 24	RSM; Ret	ARA; 13	JPN; 18	AUS; Ret	MAL; Ret	VAL; 9	20th	42
2012	Moto2	Kalex	QAT; 30	SPA; Ret	POR; 20	FRA; 7	CAT; 17	GBR; 17	NED; Ret	GER; 18	ITA; Ret	INP; 21	CZE; DNS	RSM	ARA	JPN	MAL	AUS	VAL	26th	9

=== Supersport World Championship ===
==== Races by year ====
(key) (Races in bold indicate pole position) (Races in italics indicate fastest lap)

Year	Bike	1	2	3	4	5	6	7	8	9	10	Pos	Pts
2004	Honda	SPA; 14	AUS; 8	SMR; Ret	ITA; 6	GER; 5	GBR; 11	EUR; 11	NED; 7	ITA; 11	FRA; 8	9th	63

=== Superbike World Championship ===
==== Races by year ====
(key) (Races in bold indicate pole position) (Races in italics indicate fastest lap)

Year	Bike	1		2		3		4		5		6		7		8		9		10		11		12		13		14		Pos	Pts
Year	Bike	R1	R2	R1	R2	R1	R2	R1	R2	R1	R2	R1	R2	R1	R2	R1	R2	R1	R2	R1	R2	R1	R2	R1	R2	R1	R2	R1	R2	Pos	Pts
2005	Honda	QAT; Ret	QAT; 8	AUS; 4	AUS; 3	SPA; Ret	SPA; 12	ITA; Ret	ITA; Ret	EUR; 7	EUR; 18	SMR; Ret	SMR; Ret	CZE; 14	CZE; Ret	GBR; 10	GBR; 11	NED; 8	NED; 7	GER; 7	GER; 7	ITA; 7	ITA; C	FRA; 8	FRA; 8					12th	123
2006	Ducati	QAT; 10	QAT; Ret	AUS; 18	AUS; 13	ESP; Ret	ESP; 18	ITA; Ret	ITA; Ret	EUR; 16	EUR; Ret	SMR	SMR	CZE	CZE	GBR	GBR													18th	28
2006	Suzuki																	NED; 6	NED; Ret	GER; 13	GER; Ret	ITA; Ret	ITA; Ret	FRA; 12	FRA; 14					18th	28
2007	Suzuki	QAT; 6	QAT; 10	AUS; 8	AUS; 8	EUR; 8	EUR; 10	SPA; 12	SPA; 10	NED; 10	NED; 7	ITA; 10	ITA; 12	GBR; 10	GBR; C	SMR; 9	SMR; 10	CZE; 9	CZE; 12	GBR; 10	GBR; 10	GER; Ret	GER; 10	ITA; Ret	ITA; 10	FRA; 4	FRA; Ret			9th	149
2008	Suzuki	QAT; 5	QAT; 8	AUS; 7	AUS; 5	**SPA**; Ret	**SPA**; DNS	NED; 3	NED; 5	ITA; 1	ITA; 2	USA; 4	USA; 2	**GER**; 3	**GER**; 3	SMR; 1	SMR; 7	CZE; 7	CZE; 5	GBR; 7	GBR; 4	EUR; Ret	EUR; 14	ITA; 4	ITA; 4	FRA; 5	FRA; 9	POR; Ret	POR; 4	5th	311
2009	Suzuki	AUS; 2	AUS; 6	QAT; Ret	QAT; 6	SPA; 3	SPA; 7	NED; 13	NED; 9	ITA; DNS	ITA; DNS	RSA	RSA	USA	USA	SMR	SMR	GBR	GBR	CZE	CZE	GER	GER	ITA	ITA	FRA	FRA	POR	POR	16th	75
2010	Honda	AUS; 12	AUS; 16	POR; Ret	POR; 15	SPA; 13	SPA; 17	NED; 20	NED; 9	ITA; 12	ITA; 12	RSA; 19	RSA; 17	USA; 12	USA; 12	SMR; 14	SMR; 14	CZE; Ret	CZE; Ret	GBR; 11	GBR; Ret	GER; Ret	GER; 15	ITA; 14	ITA; 12	FRA; 13	FRA; 12			18th	54
2013	Ducati	AUS; 10	AUS; 11	SPA; 11	SPA; 12	NED; 11	NED; 12	ITA; 12	ITA; 10	GBR; 14	GBR; 12	POR; 13	POR; 11	ITA; 12	ITA; 13	RUS; 7	RUS; C	GBR; 12	GBR; 12	GER; Ret	GER; 9	TUR; DNS	TUR; DNS	USA	USA	FRA	FRA	SPA; 14	SPA; 11	14th	91
2014	Ducati	AUS	AUS	SPA	SPA	NED	NED	ITA	ITA	GBR	GBR	MAL	MAL	SMR	SMR	POR	POR	USA	USA	SPA	SPA	FRA; 9	FRA; 6	QAT	QAT					23rd	17

=== FIM Endurance World Championship ===
==== By team ====
Year	Team	Bike	Rider	TC
2015	Yamaha Austria Racing Team	Yamaha YZF-R1	(Australia) Broc Parkes (Germany) Max Neukirchner (Spain) Iván Silva (South Africa) Sheridan Morais	10th
2016	Yamaha Austria Racing Team	Yamaha YZF-R1	(Australia) Broc Parkes (Germany) Max Neukirchner (Spain) Iván Silva (Germany) Marvin Fritz (Japan) Kohta Nozane (Japan) Takuya Fujita (South Africa) Sheridan Morais	6th
2017–18	Yamaha Austria Racing Team	Yamaha YZF-R1	(Germany) Marvin Fritz (Germany) Max Neukirchner (Australia) Broc Parkes (Japan) Takuya Fujita (Japan) Kohta Nozane	16th
