= 2009 Valencia Superbike World Championship round =

(Spain) 2009 Valencia Superbike World Championship round
Round details
- Round 3 of 14 rounds in the 2009 Superbike World Championship. and Round 3 of 14 rounds in the 2009 Supersport World Championship.
- Date: April 5, 2009
- Location: Valencia
- Course: Permanent racing facility 4.005 km (2.489 mi)

Superbike World Championship
Pole position
(United States) Ben Spies
1:33.270
Fastest lap race 1	Fastest lap race 2
(Japan) Noriyuki Haga	(Japan) Noriyuki Haga
1:34.862	1:34.618

Supersport World Championship
Pole position
(United Kingdom) Cal Crutchlow
1:35.865
Fastest lap
(United Kingdom) Cal Crutchlow
1:36.865

The 2009 Valencia Superbike World Championship round was the third round of the 2009 Superbike World Championship season. It took place on the weekend of April 3–5, 2009 at the Circuit de Valencia in Valencia, Spain.

== Results ==
=== Superbike race 1 ===
Pos	No	Rider	Bike	Laps	Time	Grid	Points
1	41	(Japan) Noriyuki Haga	Ducati 1098R	23	36:44.766	3	25
2	84	(Italy) Michel Fabrizio	Ducati 1098R	23	+3.677	4	20
3	76	(Germany) Max Neukirchner	Suzuki GSX-R1000 K9	23	+3.959	6	16
4	55	(France) Régis Laconi	Ducati 1098R	23	+4.210	2	13
5	91	(United Kingdom) Leon Haslam	Honda CBR1000RR	23	+13.824	10	11
6	71	(Japan) Yukio Kagayama	Suzuki GSX-R1000 K9	23	+14.562	5	10
7	66	(United Kingdom) Tom Sykes	Yamaha YZF-R1	23	+15.155	17	9
8	3	(Italy) Max Biaggi	Aprilia RSV 4	23	+16.316	18	8
9	67	(United Kingdom) Shane Byrne	Ducati 1098R	23	+20.361	12	7
10	23	(Australia) Broc Parkes	Kawasaki ZX-10R	23	+23.878	13	6
11	121	(United States) John Hopkins	Honda CBR1000RR	23	+30.902	16	5
12	9	(Japan) Ryuichi Kiyonari	Honda CBR1000RR	23	+31.298	9	4
13	111	(Spain) Ruben Xaus	BMW S1000RR	23	+32.660	19	3
14	100	(Japan) Makoto Tamada	Kawasaki ZX-10R	23	+42.156	24	2
15	33	(United Kingdom) Tommy Hill	Honda CBR1000RR	23	+43.040	22	1
16	31	(Australia) Karl Muggeridge	Suzuki GSX-R1000 K9	23	+45.204	23	
17	86	(Italy) Ayrton Badovini	Kawasaki ZX-10R	23	+52.023	27	
18	99	(Italy) Luca Scassa	Kawasaki ZX-10R	23	+52.474	25	
19	25	(Spain) David Salom	Kawasaki ZX-10R	23	+55.775	21	
20	15	(Italy) Matteo Baiocco	Kawasaki ZX-10R	23	+56.202	29	
Ret	7	(Spain) Carlos Checa	Honda CBR1000RR	21	Retirement	8	
Ret	94	(Spain) David Checa	Yamaha YZF-R1	13	Retirement	26	
Ret	24	(Australia) Brendan Roberts	Ducati 1098R	12	Accident	15	
Ret	19	(United States) Ben Spies	Yamaha YZF-R1	9	Accident	1	
Ret	77	(Italy) Vittorio Iannuzzo	Honda CBR1000RR	9	Accident	28	
Ret	88	(Austria) Roland Resch	Suzuki GSX-R1000 K9	6	Mechanical	30	
Ret	96	(Czech Republic) Jakub Smrž	Ducati 1098R	5	Accident	11	
Ret	11	(Australia) Troy Corser	BMW S1000RR	1	Accident	14	
Ret	65	(United Kingdom) Jonathan Rea	Honda CBR1000RR	1	Accident	7	
DNS	56	(Japan) Shinya Nakano	Aprilia RSV 4		Injured	20	

=== Superbike race 2 ===
Pos	No	Rider	Bike	Laps	Time	Grid	Points
1	41	(Japan) Noriyuki Haga	Ducati 1098R	23	36:46.927	3	25
2	19	(United States) Ben Spies	Yamaha YZF-R1	23	+5.105	1	20
3	84	(Italy) Michel Fabrizio	Ducati 1098R	23	+6.386	4	16
4	55	(France) Régis Laconi	Ducati 1098R	23	+6.573	2	13
5	91	(United Kingdom) Leon Haslam	Honda CBR1000RR	23	+14.075	10	11
6	7	(Spain) Carlos Checa	Honda CBR1000RR	23	+17.333	8	10
7	76	(Germany) Max Neukirchner	Suzuki GSX-R1000 K9	23	+19.207	6	9
8	3	(Italy) Max Biaggi	Aprilia RSV 4	23	+20.697	18	8
9	9	(Japan) Ryuichi Kiyonari	Honda CBR1000RR	23	+21.015	9	7
10	66	(United Kingdom) Tom Sykes	Yamaha YZF-R1	23	+22.581	17	6
11	67	(United Kingdom) Shane Byrne	Ducati 1098R	23	+22.604	12	5
12	121	(United States) John Hopkins	Honda CBR1000RR	23	+23.952	16	4
13	65	(United Kingdom) Jonathan Rea	Honda CBR1000RR	23	+29.082	7	3
14	96	(Czech Republic) Jakub Smrž	Ducati 1098R	23	+29.277	11	2
15	11	(Australia) Troy Corser	BMW S1000RR	23	+32.384	14	1
16	111	(Spain) Ruben Xaus	BMW S1000RR	23	+35.125	19	
17	23	(Australia) Broc Parkes	Kawasaki ZX-10R	23	+38.344	13	
18	24	(Australia) Brendan Roberts	Ducati 1098R	23	+39.161	15	
19	31	(Australia) Karl Muggeridge	Suzuki GSX-R1000 K9	23	+39.374	23	
20	94	(Spain) David Checa	Yamaha YZF-R1	23	+49.904	26	
21	25	(Spain) David Salom	Kawasaki ZX-10R	23	+52.631	21	
22	33	(United Kingdom) Tommy Hill	Honda CBR1000RR	23	+52.966	22	
23	77	(Italy) Vittorio Iannuzzo	Honda CBR1000RR	23	+53.196	28	
24	99	(Italy) Luca Scassa	Kawasaki ZX-10R	23	+53.491	25	
25	88	(Austria) Roland Resch	Suzuki GSX-R1000 K9	23	+1:19.946	30	
Ret	71	(Japan) Yukio Kagayama	Suzuki GSX-R1000 K9	21	Retirement	5	
Ret	15	(Italy) Matteo Baiocco	Kawasaki ZX-10R	20	Retirement	29	
Ret	100	(Japan) Makoto Tamada	Kawasaki ZX-10R	11	Retirement	24	
Ret	86	(Italy) Ayrton Badovini	Kawasaki ZX-10R	7	Retirement	27	
DNS	56	(Japan) Shinya Nakano	Aprilia RSV 4		Injured	20	

=== Supersport race ===
Pos	No	Rider	Bike	Laps	Time	Grid	Points
1	35	(United Kingdom) Cal Crutchlow	Yamaha YZF-R6	23	38:15.613	1	25
2	13	(Australia) Anthony West	Honda CBR600RR	23	+0.171	3	20
3	54	(Turkey) Kenan Sofuoglu	Honda CBR600RR	23	+8.408	11	16
4	8	(Australia) Mark Aitchison	Honda CBR600RR	23	+12.421	6	13
5	21	(Japan) Katsuaki Fujiwara	Kawasaki ZX-6R	23	+16.529	4	11
6	14	(France) Matthieu Lagrive	Honda CBR600RR	23	+19.242	7	10
7	51	(Italy) Michele Pirro	Yamaha YZF-R6	23	+26.124	5	9
8	77	(Netherlands) Barry Veneman	Suzuki GSX-R600	23	+34.525	12	8
9	50	(Republic of Ireland) Eugene Laverty	Honda CBR600RR	23	+35.436	13	7
10	99	(France) Fabien Foret	Yamaha YZF-R6	23	+38.337	8	6
11	105	(Italy) Gianluca Vizziello	Honda CBR600RR	23	+39.759	16	5
12	127	(Denmark) Robbin Harms	Honda CBR600RR	23	+39.970	10	4
13	1	(Australia) Andrew Pitt	Honda CBR600RR	23	+50.532	9	3
14	55	(Italy) Massimo Roccoli	Honda CBR600RR	23	+51.506	14	2
15	5	(Indonesia) Doni Tata Pradita	Yamaha YZF-R6	23	+1:02.755	18	1
16	7	(Czech Republic) Patrik Vostárek	Honda CBR600RR	23	+1:12.275	23	
17	28	(Netherlands) Arie Vos	Honda CBR600RR	23	+1:24.237	24	
18	117	(Portugal) Miguel Praia	Honda CBR600RR	23	+1:31.250	19	
19	26	(Spain) Joan Lascorz	Kawasaki ZX-6R	22	+1 Lap	2	
20	88	(Spain) Yannick Guerra	Yamaha YZF-R6	22	+1 Lap	27	
21	32	(Italy) Fabrizio Lai	Honda CBR600RR	18	+5 Laps	26	
Ret	78	(Australia) Shaun Geronimi	Suzuki GSX-R600	18	Retirement	28	
Ret	83	(Australia) Russell Holland	Honda CBR600RR	15	Retirement	20	
Ret	9	(Italy) Danilo dell'Omo	Honda CBR600RR	14	Retirement	22	
Ret	24	(Australia) Garry McCoy	Triumph Daytona 675	13	Retirement	17	
Ret	69	(Italy) Gianluca Nannelli	Triumph Daytona 675	11	Mechanical	15	
Ret	96	(Czech Republic) Matej Smrž	Triumph Daytona 675	11	Accident	25	
Ret	30	(Germany) Jesco Günther	Honda CBR600RR	4	Retirement	21	

== Superstock 1000 race classification ==
Pos.	No.	Rider	Bike	Laps	Time/Retired	Grid	Points
1	71	(Italy) Claudio Corti	Suzuki GSX-R1000 K9	13	21:18.839	2	25
2	19	(Belgium) Xavier Simeon	Ducati 1098R	13	+4.939	3	20
3	21	(France) Maxime Berger	Honda CBR1000RR	13	+7.339	5	16
4	112	(Spain) Javier Forés	Kawasaki ZX-10R	13	+11.388	8	13
5	77	(United Kingdom) Barry Burrell	Honda CBR1000RR	13	+15.167	17	11
6	29	(Italy) Daniele Beretta	Ducati 1098R	13	+16.927	12	10
7	69	(Czech Republic) Ondřej Ježek	Honda CBR1000RR	13	+17.129	6	9
8	119	(Italy) Michele Magnoni	Yamaha YZF-R1	13	+17.855	14	8
9	111	(Spain) Ismael Ortega	Kawasaki ZX-10R	13	+27.934	23	7
10	8	(Italy) Andrea Antonelli	Yamaha YZF-R1	13	+28.101	15	6
11	7	(Austria) René Mähr	Suzuki GSX-R1000 K9	13	+29.031	13	5
12	30	(Switzerland) Michaël Savary	Honda CBR1000RR	13	+29.418	19	4
13	46	(United Kingdom) Tommy Bridewell	Yamaha YZF-R1	13	+42.639	22	3
14	72	(France) Nicolas Pouhair	Yamaha YZF-R1	13	+43.580	29	2
15	53	(Germany) Dominic Lammert	Suzuki GSX-R1000 K9	13	+48.918	21	1
16	93	(France) Matthieu Lussiana	Yamaha YZF-R1	13	+51.384	28	
17	5	(Netherlands) Danny De Boer	Yamaha YZF-R1	13	+52.590	26	
18	117	(Italy) Denis Sacchetti	KTM RC8 R	13	+53.445	24	
19	16	(Netherlands) Raymond Schouten	Yamaha YZF-R1	13	+55.472	11	
20	11	(Spain) Pere Tutusaus	KTM RC8 R	13	+56.456	27	
21	107	(Italy) Niccolò Rosso	Yamaha YZF-R1	13	+57.086	30	
22	63	(Sweden) Per Björk	Honda CBR1000RR	13	+57.095	34	
23	36	(Brazil) Philippe Thiriet	Honda CBR1000RR	13	+59.182	31	
24	64	(Brazil) Danilo Andric	Yamaha YZF-R1	13	+1:00.038	35	
Ret	14	(Italy) Federico Biaggi	Aprilia RSV4 Factory	12	Retirement	36	
Ret	22	(United Kingdom) Alex Lowes	MV Agusta F4 312 R	11	Technical problem	18	
Ret	2	(Italy) Luca Morelli	Kawasaki ZX-10R	11	Retirement	33	
Ret	65	(France) Loris Baz	Yamaha YZF-R1	10	Accident	7	
Ret	20	(France) Sylvain Barrier	Yamaha YZF-R1	9	Accident	4	
Ret	44	(Hungary) Balázs Németh	Honda CBR1000RR	9	Accident	9	
Ret	86	(France) Loïc Napoleone	Suzuki GSX-R1000 K9	7	Accident	10	
Ret	34	(Italy) Davide Giugliano	MV Agusta F4 312 R	4	Retirement	1	
Ret	51	(Spain) Santiago Barragán	Honda CBR1000RR	3	Retirement	16	
Ret	25	(United Kingdom) Gregg Black	Yamaha YZF-R1	3	Retirement	25	
DNS	91	(Sweden) Hampus Johansson	Yamaha YZF-R1	0	Did not start	20	
DNS	66	(Poland) Mateusz Stoklosa	Honda CBR1000RR	0	Did not start	32	
DNS	23	(Italy) Federico Sandi	Aprilia RSV4 Factory		Did not start		
WD	12	(Italy) Nico Vivarelli	Honda CBR1000RR		Withdrew		

== Superstock 600 race classification ==
Pos.	No.	Rider	Bike	Laps	Time/Retired	Grid	Points
1	9	(Italy) Danilo Petrucci	Yamaha YZF-R6	11	18:31.326	1	25
2	55	(Belgium) Vincent Lonbois	Yamaha YZF-R6	11	+3.923	2	20
3	4	(United Kingdom) Gino Rea	Honda CBR600RR	11	+4.871	3	16
4	5	(Italy) Marco Bussolotti	Yamaha YZF-R6	11	+5.108	4	13
5	11	(France) Jérémy Guarnoni	Yamaha YZF-R6	11	+9.444	6	11
6	37	(Netherlands) Joey Litjens	Yamaha YZF-R6	11	+14.817	8	10
7	89	(Austria) Stefan Kerschbaumer	Yamaha YZF-R6	11	+16.528	7	9
8	7	(France) Baptiste Guittet	Honda CBR600RR	11	+16.743	12	8
9	36	(Poland) Andrzej Chmielewski	Yamaha YZF-R6	11	+16.995	10	7
10	13	(Italy) Dino Lombardi	Kawasaki ZX-6R	11	+17.224	9	6
11	10	(Spain) Nacho Calero	Kawasaki ZX-6R	11	+35.794	13	5
12	23	(Switzerland) Christian Von Gunten	Suzuki GSX-R600	11	+42.308	15	4
13	132	(Italy) Daniele Manfrinati	Honda CBR600RR	11	+47.218	16	3
14	12	(Italy) Riccardo Cecchini	Honda CBR600RR	11	+47.449	14	2
Ret	19	(Italy) Nico Morelli	Honda CBR600RR	3	Retirement	11	
Ret	26	(Romania) Mircea Vrăjitoru	Yamaha YZF-R6	2	Accident	17	
Ret	81	(Czech Republic) David Látr	Honda CBR600RR	2	Accident	18	
Ret	47	(Italy) Eddi La Marra	Honda CBR600RR	0	Accident	5	
DNQ	30	(Romania) Bogdan Vrăjitoru	Yamaha YZF-R6		Did not qualify		
