= 2009 Monza Superbike World Championship round =

(Italy) 2009 Monza Superbike World Championship round
Round details
- Round 5 of 14 rounds in the 2009 Superbike World Championship. and Round 5 of 14 rounds in the 2009 Supersport World Championship.
- Date: May 10, 2009
- Location: Monza
- Course: Permanent racing facility 5.793 km (3.600 mi)

Superbike World Championship
Pole position
(United States) Ben Spies
1:44.073
Fastest lap race 1	Fastest lap race 2
(Italy) Michel Fabrizio	(United States) Ben Spies
1:45.336	1:45.344

Supersport World Championship
Pole position
(United Kingdom) Cal Crutchlow
1:49.706
Fastest lap
(United Kingdom) Cal Crutchlow
1:49.728

The 2009 Monza Superbike World Championship round was the fifth round of the 2009 Superbike World Championship season. It took place on the weekend of May 8–10, 2009 at Monza.

== Results ==
=== Superbike race 1 ===
Race 1 was stopped before the end of the first lap because of an accident on the first corner that left debris and oil on the track. It was later restarted but Max Neukirchner, Brendan Roberts and Makoto Tamada were not able to restart due to the injuries suffered in the crash. Neukirchner suffered a broken right femur and a dislocation to his right foot, while Roberts suffered bruising, and Tamada suffered a broken wrist. All three riders have been ruled out of the next round at Kyalami.

Max Biaggi was given a 20-second penalty for cutting a chicane.

Pos	No	Rider	Bike	Laps	Time	Grid	Points
1	84	(Italy) Michel Fabrizio	Ducati 1098R	18	31:50.758	2	25
2	41	(Japan) Noriyuki Haga	Ducati 1098R	18	+0.239	5	20
3	9	(Japan) Ryuichi Kiyonari	Honda CBR1000RR	18	+8.175	3	16
4	71	(Japan) Yukio Kagayama	Suzuki GSX-R1000 K9	18	+11.001	8	13
5	65	(United Kingdom) Jonathan Rea	Honda CBR1000RR	18	+12.447	6	11
6	66	(United Kingdom) Tom Sykes	Yamaha YZF-R1	18	+13.693	10	10
7	111	(Spain) Ruben Xaus	BMW S1000RR	18	+19.172	14	9
8	55	(France) Régis Laconi	Ducati 1098R	18	+24.989	12	8
9	7	(Spain) Carlos Checa	Honda CBR1000RR	18	+26.930	9	7
10	23	(Australia) Broc Parkes	Kawasaki ZX-10R	18	+27.418	13	6
11	3	(Italy) Max Biaggi	Aprilia RSV 4	18	+27.752	7	5
12	96	(Czech Republic) Jakub Smrž	Ducati 1098R	18	+29.545	20	4
13	56	(Japan) Shinya Nakano	Aprilia RSV 4	18	+30.952	16	3
14	67	(United Kingdom) Shane Byrne	Ducati 1098R	18	+31.414	15	2
15	19	(United States) Ben Spies	Yamaha YZF-R1	18	+36.998	1	1
16	31	(Australia) Karl Muggeridge	Suzuki GSX-R1000 K9	18	+42.732	19	
17	15	(Italy) Matteo Baiocco	Kawasaki ZX-10R	18	+48.835	24	
18	98	(United States) Jake Zemke	Honda CBR1000RR	18	+48.888	25	
19	25	(Spain) David Salom	Kawasaki ZX-10R	18	+50.612	27	
20	33	(United Kingdom) Tommy Hill	Honda CBR1000RR	18	+51.706	21	
21	77	(Italy) Vittorio Iannuzzo	Honda CBR1000RR	18	+55.510	28	
22	94	(Spain) David Checa	Yamaha YZF-R1	18	+58.214	26	
23	99	(Italy) Luca Scassa	Kawasaki ZX-10R	18	+1:01.130	18	
24	88	(Austria) Roland Resch	Suzuki GSX-R1000 K9	18	+1:16.850	29	
Ret	91	(United Kingdom) Leon Haslam	Honda CBR1000RR	17	Mechanical	17	
Ret	11	(Australia) Troy Corser	BMW S1000RR	0	Accident	11	
DNS	76	(Germany) Max Neukirchner	Suzuki GSX-R1000 K9		Injured in first start	4	
DNS	24	(Australia) Brendan Roberts	Ducati 1098R		Injured in first start	22	
DNS	100	(Japan) Makoto Tamada	Kawasaki ZX-10R		Injured in first start	23	

=== Superbike race 2 ===
Shane Byrne was given a 20-second penalty for cutting a chicane. Ride through penalties were given for the same reason to Yukio Kagayama, Vittorio Iannuzzo, David Checa and David Salom. Iannuzzo was black-flagged for ignoring the penalty. Troy Corser did not race due to injuries suffered in both starts of the first race, and also missed the following round at Kyalami.

Pos	No	Rider	Bike	Laps	Time	Grid	Points
1	19	(United States) Ben Spies	Yamaha YZF-R1	18	31:49.252	1	25
2	84	(Italy) Michel Fabrizio	Ducati 1098R	18	+2.665	2	20
3	9	(Japan) Ryuichi Kiyonari	Honda CBR1000RR	18	+2.810	3	16
4	65	(United Kingdom) Jonathan Rea	Honda CBR1000RR	18	+7.706	6	13
5	3	(Italy) Max Biaggi	Aprilia RSV 4	18	+7.863	7	11
6	66	(United Kingdom) Tom Sykes	Yamaha YZF-R1	18	+10.383	10	10
7	91	(United Kingdom) Leon Haslam	Honda CBR1000RR	18	+11.586	17	9
8	96	(Czech Republic) Jakub Smrž	Ducati 1098R	18	+21.112	20	8
9	111	(Spain) Ruben Xaus	BMW S1000RR	18	+22.112	14	7
10	7	(Spain) Carlos Checa	Honda CBR1000RR	18	+22.261	9	6
11	55	(France) Régis Laconi	Ducati 1098R	18	+23.453	12	5
12	56	(Japan) Shinya Nakano	Aprilia RSV 4	18	+32.956	16	4
13	23	(Australia) Broc Parkes	Kawasaki ZX-10R	18	+37.166	13	3
14	99	(Italy) Luca Scassa	Kawasaki ZX-10R	18	+43.085	18	2
15	15	(Italy) Matteo Baiocco	Kawasaki ZX-10R	18	+43.088	24	1
16	33	(United Kingdom) Tommy Hill	Honda CBR1000RR	18	+43.825	21	
17	71	(Japan) Yukio Kagayama	Suzuki GSX-R1000 K9	18	+53.211	8	
18	67	(United Kingdom) Shane Byrne	Ducati 1098R	18	+1:00.917	15	
19	94	(Spain) David Checa	Yamaha YZF-R1	18	+1:17.915	26	
20	98	(United States) Jake Zemke	Honda CBR1000RR	18	+1:28.545	25	
21	25	(Spain) David Salom	Kawasaki ZX-10R	18	+1:29.016	27	
Ret	88	(Austria) Roland Resch	Suzuki GSX-R1000 K9	17	Retirement	29	
Ret	31	(Australia) Karl Muggeridge	Suzuki GSX-R1000 K9	3	Accident	19	
Ret	41	(Japan) Noriyuki Haga	Ducati 1098R	2	Accident	5	
DSQ	77	(Italy) Vittorio Iannuzzo	Honda CBR1000RR	5	Ignored ride through	28	
DNS	11	(Australia) Troy Corser	BMW S1000RR		Injured in race 1	11	
DNS	76	(Germany) Max Neukirchner	Suzuki GSX-R1000 K9		Injured	4	
DNS	24	(Australia) Brendan Roberts	Ducati 1098R		Injured	22	
DNS	100	(Japan) Makoto Tamada	Kawasaki ZX-10R		Injured	23	

=== Supersport race ===
Pos	No	Rider	Bike	Laps	Time	Grid	Points
1	35	(United Kingdom) Cal Crutchlow	Yamaha YZF-R6	16	29:34.605	1	25
2	26	(Spain) Joan Lascorz	Kawasaki ZX-6R	16	+2.660	2	20
3	99	(France) Fabien Foret	Yamaha YZF-R6	16	+2.716	3	16
4	50	(Republic of Ireland) Eugene Laverty	Honda CBR600RR	16	+2.780	4	13
5	1	(Australia) Andrew Pitt	Honda CBR600RR	16	+9.270	7	11
6	21	(Japan) Katsuaki Fujiwara	Kawasaki ZX-6R	16	+9.332	10	10
7	51	(Italy) Michele Pirro	Yamaha YZF-R6	16	+20.178	12	9
8	24	(Australia) Garry McCoy	Triumph Daytona 675	16	+20.221	9	8
9	54	(Turkey) Kenan Sofuoğlu	Honda CBR600RR	16	+22.681	6	7
10	69	(Italy) Gianluca Nannelli	Triumph Daytona 675	16	+26.993	8	6
11	12	(Italy) Franco Battaini	Yamaha YZF-R6	16	+31.343	13	5
12	117	(Portugal) Miguel Praia	Honda CBR600RR	16	+32.236	15	4
13	77	(Netherlands) Barry Veneman	Suzuki GSX-R600	16	+32.695	17	3
14	105	(Italy) Gianluca Vizziello	Honda CBR600RR	16	+33.216	18	2
15	53	(Italy) Alex Polita	Suzuki GSX-R600	16	+33.652	19	1
16	14	(France) Matthieu Lagrive	Honda CBR600RR	16	+37.937	11	
17	5	(Indonesia) Doni Tata Pradita	Yamaha YZF-R6	16	+44.249	23	
18	30	(Germany) Jesco Günther	Honda CBR600RR	16	+44.860	22	
19	9	(Italy) Danilo dell'Omo	Honda CBR600RR	16	+56.772	16	
20	28	(Netherlands) Arie Vos	Honda CBR600RR	16	+1'13.876	25	
21	32	(Italy) Fabrizio Lai	Honda CBR600RR	16	+1:14.344	24	
22	71	(Spain) José Morillas	Yamaha YZF-R6	16	+1:45.778	28	
Ret	55	(Italy) Massimo Roccoli	Honda CBR600RR	15	Accident	14	
Ret	83	(Australia) Russell Holland	Honda CBR600RR	13	Accident	26	
Ret	8	(Australia) Mark Aitchison	Honda CBR600RR	10	Accident	5	
Ret	88	(Spain) Yannick Guerra	Yamaha YZF-R6	8	Accident	27	
Ret	13	(Australia) Anthony West	Honda CBR600RR	2	Accident	20	

== Superstock 1000 race classification ==
Loïc Napoleone, Ismael Ortega, and Domenico Colucci were given a 20-second time penalty after failing to complete the Ride through penalties before the end of the race.

Pos.	No.	Rider	Bike	Laps	Time/Retired	Grid	Points
1	71	(Italy) Claudio Corti	Suzuki GSX-R1000 K9	11	20:10.356	2	25
2	19	(Belgium) Xavier Simeon	Ducati 1098R	11	+0.010	1	20
3	112	(Spain) Javier Forés	Kawasaki ZX-10R	11	+4.560	5	16
4	29	(Italy) Daniele Beretta	Ducati 1098R	11	+6.777	6	13
5	20	(France) Sylvain Barrier	Yamaha YZF-R1	11	+7.406	8	11
6	69	(Czech Republic) Ondřej Ježek	Honda CBR1000RR	11	+17.620	10	10
7	45	(Italy) Luca Verdini	Honda CBR1000RR	11	+20.616	12	9
8	23	(Italy) Federico Sandi	Aprilia RSV4 Factory	11	+22.373	15	8
9	131	(Italy) Patrizio Valsecchi	Yamaha YZF-R1	11	+24.066	18	7
10	65	(France) Loris Baz	Yamaha YZF-R1	11	+27.481	24	6
11	30	(Switzerland) Michaël Savary	Honda CBR1000RR	11	+27.905	19	5
12	86	(France) Loïc Napoleone	Suzuki GSX-R1000 K9	11	+30.363	11	4
13	14	(Italy) Federico Biaggi	Aprilia RSV4 Factory	11	+30.706	21	3
14	111	(Spain) Ismael Ortega	Kawasaki ZX-10R	11	+31.437	13	2
15	2	(Italy) Luca Morelli	Kawasaki ZX-10R	11	+33.391	27	1
16	107	(Italy) Niccolò Rosso	Yamaha YZF-R1	11	+33.555	28	
17	93	(France) Mathieu Lussiana	Yamaha YZF-R1	11	+38.235	23	
18	117	(Italy) Denis Sacchetti	KTM RC8 R	11	+39.461	36	
19	91	(Sweden) Hampus Johansson	Yamaha YZF-R1	11	+39.531	22	
20	46	(United Kingdom) Tommy Bridewell	Yamaha YZF-R1	11	+43.356	33	
21	72	(France) Nicolas Pouhair	Yamaha YZF-R1	11	+44.041	34	
22	64	(Brazil) Danilo Andric	Yamaha YZF-R1	11	+44.504	31	
23	5	(Netherlands) Danny De Boer	Yamaha YZF-R1	11	+44.636	26	
24	12	(Italy) Nico Vivarelli	Honda CBR1000RR	11	+49.522	32	
25	36	(Brazil) Philippe Thiriet	Honda CBR1000RR	11	+54.339	35	
26	89	(Italy) Domenico Colucci	Ducati 1098R	11	+57.966	4	
27	11	(Spain) Pere Tutusaus	KTM RC8 R	10	+1 lap	38	
28	53	(Germany) Dominic Lammert	Suzuki GSX-R1000 K9	8	+3 lap	20	
29	7	(Austria) René Mähr	Suzuki GSX-R1000 K9	8	+3 lap	16	
NC	16	(Netherlands) Raymond Schouten	Yamaha YZF-R1	4	+7 lap	9	
Ret	63	(Sweden) Per Björk	Honda CBR1000RR	9	Retirement	30	
Ret	66	(Poland) Mateusz Stoklosa	Honda CBR1000RR	9	Retirement	39	
Ret	34	(Italy) Davide Giugliano	MV Agusta F4 312 R	7	Retirement	7	
Ret	8	(Italy) Andrea Antonelli	Yamaha YZF-R1	6	Retirement	14	
Ret	22	(United Kingdom) Alex Lowes	MV Agusta F4 312 R	4	Retirement	37	
Ret	25	(United Kingdom) Gregg Black	Yamaha YZF-R1	4	Retirement	17	
Ret	77	(United Kingdom) Barry Burrell	Honda CBR1000RR	3	Retirement	29	
Ret	21	(France) Maxime Berger	Honda CBR1000RR	2	Retirement	3	
Ret	51	(Spain) Santiago Barragán	Honda CBR1000RR	1	Technical problem	25	

== Superstock 600 race classification ==
Pos.	No.	Rider	Bike	Laps	Time/Retired	Grid	Points
1	9	(Italy) Danilo Petrucci	Yamaha YZF-R6	8	15:17.215	2	25
2	55	(Belgium) Vincent Lonbois	Yamaha YZF-R6	8	+5.375	6	20
3	11	(France) Jérémy Guarnoni	Yamaha YZF-R6	8	+5.429	10	16
4	5	(Italy) Marco Bussolotti	Yamaha YZF-R6	8	+5.457	3	13
5	47	(Italy) Eddi La Marra	Honda CBR600RR	8	+5.709	8	11
6	133	(Italy) Giuliano Gregorini	Yamaha YZF-R6	8	+11.133	5	10
7	4	(United Kingdom) Gino Rea	Honda CBR600RR	8	+14.007	7	9
8	37	(Netherlands) Joey Litjens	Yamaha YZF-R6	8	+20.721	9	8
9	36	(Poland) Andrzej Chmielewski	Yamaha YZF-R6	8	+20.868	12	7
10	12	(Italy) Riccardo Checchini	Honda CBR600RR	8	+22.803	17	6
11	13	(Italy) Dino Lombardi	Kawasaki ZX-6R	8	+22.892	15	5
12	7	(France) Baptiste Guittet	Honda CBR600RR	8	+23.265	11	4
13	89	(Austria) Stefan Kerschbaumer	Yamaha YZF-R6	8	+25.016	14	3
14	19	(Italy) Nico Morelli	Honda CBR600RR	8	+30.702	16	2
15	10	(Spain) Nacho Calero	Yamaha YZF-R6	8	+41.939	19	1
16	81	(Czech Republic) David Látr	Honda CBR600RR	8	+50.254	20	
17	26	(Romania) Mircea Vrăjitoru	Yamaha YZF-R6	8	+54.113	21	
18	30	(Romania) Bogdan Vrăjitoru	Yamaha YZF-R6	8	+1:41.997	22	
DSQ	28	(Italy) Ferruccio Lamborghini	Yamaha YZF-R6	8	(+0.054)	1	
DSQ	84	(Italy) Fabio Massei	Yamaha YZF-R6	8	(+4.695)	4	
Ret	132	(Italy) Daniele Manfrinati	Honda CBR600RR	0	Accident	18	
Ret	23	(Switzerland) Christian Von Gunten	Suzuki GSX-R600	0	Accident	13	
