= 2019–20 FIM Endurance World Championship =

Motorcycle endurance racing season

The 2019–20 FIM Endurance World Championship was the 41st season of the FIM Endurance World Championship, a motorcycle racing series co–organised by the Fédération Internationale de Motocyclisme (FIM) and Eurosport. The season started at the Bol d'Or on the 21 September 2019 and ended with the 12 Hours of Estoril on the 27 September 2020.

== Calendar ==
The calendar for the 2019–2020 season was released on 18 July 2019.

Rnd	Race	Circuit	Location	Date
1	Bol d'Or	(France) Circuit Paul Ricard	Le Castellet, France	21–22 September 2019
2	8 Hours of Sepang	(Malaysia) Sepang International Circuit	Selangor, Malaysia	14 December 2019
3	24 Hours Moto	(France) Bugatti Circuit	Le Mans, France	29-30 August 2020
4	12 Hours of Estoril	(Portugal) Autodromo do Estoril	Cascais, Portugal	27 September 2020
Cancelled due to the COVID-19 pandemic
	8 Hours of Oschersleben	(Germany) Motorsport Arena Oschersleben	Saxony-Anhalt, Germany	6 June 2020
	Suzuka 8 Hours	(Japan) Suzuka International Racing Course	Suzuka, Japan	19 July 2020
	Bol d'Or	(France) Circuit Paul Ricard	Le Castellet, France	19–20 September 2020

=== Calendar changes ===
- The 8 Hours of Slovakia Ring was replaced by the new 8 Hours of Sepang.
- Due to the coronavirus, the Oschersleben round was cancelled, and Le Mans and Suzuka were postponed to a later date.
- The 2020 Bol d'Or was included in the updated calendar.
- Further calendar changes saw the 2020 Bol d'Or & Suzuka 8 Hours cancelled. The former was replaced by the 12 Hours of Estoril.

== Results and standings ==
=== Race results ===
Bold indicates the overall race winner.

Rnd.	Circuit	Formula EWC Winners	Superstock Winners	Experimental Winners	Report
1	Le Castellet	**(France) No. 2 Suzuki Endurance Racing Team**	(France) No. 96 MOTO AIN	(France) No. 17 ITeM17	
1	Le Castellet	**(France) Gregg Black** **(France) Etienne Masson** **(France) Vincent Philippe**	(France) Hugo Clere (Switzerland) Robin Mulhauser (Italy) Roberto Rolfo	(Italy) Jacopo Cretaro (Japan) Hikari Okubo (France) Gabriel Pons	
2	Sepang	**(Austria) No. 7 YART - Yamaha**	(France) No. 96 MOTO AIN	No Entries	
2	Sepang	**(Italy) Niccolò Canepa** **(Czech Republic) Karel Hanika** **(Australia) Broc Parkes**	(France) Hugo Clere (Switzerland) Robin Mulhauser (Italy) Roberto Rolfo	No Entries	
3	Le Mans	**No. 5 F.C.C. TSR Honda France**	(Germany) No. 56 GERT56 by GS YUASA	No Finishers	
3	Le Mans	**(Australia) Joshua Hook** **(France) Freddy Foray** **(France) Mike Di Meglio**	(Germany) Toni Finsterbusch (Germany) Lucy Glöckner (Austria) Stefan Kerschbaumer	No Finishers	
4	Estoril	**(Austria) No. 7 YART - Yamaha**	(France) No. 96 MOTO AIN	No Entries	
4	Estoril	**(Italy) Niccolò Canepa** **(Germany) Marvin Fritz** **(Czech Republic) Karel Hanika**	(France) Hugo Clere (Switzerland) Robin Mulhauser (Italy) Roberto Rolfo	No Entries	

=== Championship standings ===
Points systems

Rounds	1st	2nd	3rd	4th	5th	6th	7th	8th	9th	10th	11th	12th	13th	14th	15th	16th	17th	18th	19th	20th
1 & 3	40	33	28	24	21	19	17	15	13	11	10	9	8	7	6	5	4	3	2	1
2	30	24	21	19	17	15	14	13	12	11	10	9	8	7	6	5	4	3	2	1
4	52.5	43.5	37.5	31.5	27	24	21	19.5	18	16.5	15	13.5	12	10.5	9	7.5	6	4.5	3	1.5
Bonus	10	9	8	7	6	5	4	3	2	1	—N/a									
Grid	5	4	3	2	1	—N/a														

==== EWC Team's World Championship ====
Pos	Team	Bike	LEC (France)	SEP (Malaysia)	LMS (France)	EST (Portugal)	Points
1	(France) Suzuki Endurance Racing Team	Suzuki	60	19	48	40.5	167.5
2	(Austria) YART - Yamaha	Yamaha	13	30	39	67.5	149.5
3	(Japan) F.C.C. TSR Honda France	Honda	13	12	62	56.5	143.5
4	(Poland) Wójcik Racing Team	Yamaha	48		22	44.5	114.5
5	Webike SRC Kawasaki France	Kawasaki	11	19	50	32	112
6	(Belgium) BMW Motorrad World Endurance Team	BMW	42	22	18	26	108
7	(France) VRD Igol Pierret Experiences	Yamaha	29	2	31	32	94
8	(France) 3ART - Moto Team 95	Yamaha	20	13	29	21	83
9	(Slovakia) MACO Racing Team	Yamaha	30	0	16	17.5	63.5
10	Team LRP Poland	BMW	7	6	14	23.5	50.5
11	(France) Tati Team Beaujolais Racing	Kawasaki	24	1	10		35
12	Bolliger Team Switzerland	Kawasaki	11	8	11		30
13	(Japan) Honda Asia-Dream Racing with SHOWA	Honda		28			28
14	(Germany) Motobox Kremer Racing #65	Yamaha		0	13	13.5	26.5
15	(France) Tecmas BMW GMC	BMW	26				26
16	(United Kingdom) British Endurance Racing Team	Suzuki	3	0	8	15	26
17	(France) National Motos	Honda	15	7			22
18	(Malaysia) Yamaha Sepang Racing	Yamaha		20			20
19	(Malaysia) BMW Sepang Racing	BMW		14			14
20	(Germany) Team ERC Endurance	Ducati		12	2		14
21	(Spain) Suzuki JEG - Kagayama	Suzuki	12	0			12
22	(Japan) Team Plusone	BMW		11			11
23	(Belgium) Mototech EWC Team	Yamaha	11				11
24	(France) Sun Chlorella by R2CL	Suzuki		10			10
25	(Switzerland) Zuff Racing Honda Swiss Team	Honda	8				8
26	(Austria) Bertl K. Racing Team	BMW	5	3			8
27	(Portugal) FSB Matt Racing	Yamaha	6				6
28	(Japan) Team Kodoma	Yamaha		5			5
29	(Japan) KRP Sanyokougyou & will raise RS-ITOH	Kawasaki		4			4
30	(France) EMRT	Yamaha	4				4

==== EWC Manufacturer's World Championship ====
Pos	Manufacturer	LEC (France)	SEP (Malaysia)	LMS (France)	EST (Portugal)	Points
1	(Japan) Yamaha	57	45	45	90	237
2	(Japan) Suzuki	49	29	36	46.5	160.5
3	(Japan) Honda	21	33	40	43.5	137.5
4	(Germany) BMW	45	35	11	40.5	131.5
5	(Japan) Kawasaki	30	25	43	24	122
6	(Italy) Ducati		12	0		12

==== Superstock Team's World Cup ====
Pos	Team	Bike	LEC (France)	SEP (Malaysia)	LMS (France)	EST (Portugal)	Points
1	(France) MOTO AIN	Yamaha	64	34	50	67.5	215.5
2	(Italy) No Limits Motor Team	Suzuki	28	17	51	38	134
3	(Germany) GERT56 by GS Yuasa	BMW	34	27	61		122
4	(Poland) Wójcik Racing Team 2	Yamaha	41	12	3	47.5	103.5
5	(France) JMA Motos Action Bike	Suzuki	10	13	26	38.5	87.5
6	(France) Team 33 Coyote Louit Moto	Kawasaki	14	20	41		75
7	(France) BMRT 3D Maxxess Nevers	Kawasaki	52	11	7		70
8	(France) AM Moto Racing Competition	Kawasaki	25	9	18		62
9	(Italy) Team Aviobike	Yamaha		5		53.5	58.5
10	(France) Motors Events	Suzuki	41	2			43
11	(France) Energie Endurance 91	Kawasaki	19	7	9		35
12	(France) Junior Team LMS Suzuki	Suzuki	16		16		32
13	(France) Rac 41	Honda	15	15			30
14	(France) OG Motorsport by Sarazin	Yamaha		8	22		30
15	(Japan) Tone RT Syncedge 4413 BMW	BMW		26			26
16	(France) ARTEC #199	Kawasaki				29	29
17	(France) Slider Endurance	Yamaha			23		23
18	(France) LCR Endurance	Yamaha	1			25	26
19	(France) Falcon Racing Rennes Motos	Yamaha	0		18		18
20	(France) Pitlane Endurance	Yamaha	5	10		2	17
21	(France) Dunlop Motors Events	Suzuki	6		10		16
22	(France) Team 202	Yamaha	4	6	6		16
23	(Japan) Team Hanshin Riding School	Kawasaki		14			14
24	(France) Players	Kawasaki	13				13
25	(France) Aprilia Le Mans 2 Roues	Aprilia			8		8
26	(France) Moto Sport Endurance	Yamaha			7		7
27	(France) Girls Racing Team	Yamaha	7				7
28	(France) Atlantic Racing Team	Honda			5		5
29	(France) Team Racing 85	Kawasaki			4		4
30	(France) PLR	Yamaha	3				3
31	(Switzerland) Pecable Racing Team	Kawasaki	2				2
32	(France) Space Moto 37	Suzuki	1				1

==== Superstock Manufacturer's World Cup ====
Pos	Manufacturer	LEC (France)	SEP (Malaysia)	LMS (France)	EST (Portugal)	Points
1	(Japan) Yamaha	64	42	47	96	249
2	(Japan) Suzuki	47	30	54	58.5	189.5
3	(Japan) Kawasaki	50	33	41	24	148
4	(Germany) BMW	21	45	40		106
5	(Japan) Honda	13	15	5		33
	(Italy) Aprilia			8		8

==== Independent Team's Championship ====
Pos	No.	Team	Bike	Points
1	333	VRD Igol Pierret Experiences	Yamaha	122.5
2	77	Wójcik Racing Team	Yamaha	120.5
3	96	Team MOTO AIN	Yamaha	110.5
4	36	3ART - Best of Bike	Yamaha	99
5	14	Maco Racing Team	Yamaha	68
6	44	No Limits Motor Team	Suzuki	60.5
7	90	Team LRP Poland	BMW	55.5
8	777	Wójcik Racing Team 2	Yamaha	40
9	34	JMA Motos Action Bike	Suzuki	38
10	65	Motobox Kremer Racing #65	Yamaha	37
11	8	Bolliger Team Switzerland	Kawasaki	33
12	31	British Endurance Racing Team	Suzuki	28.5
13	55	National Motos	Honda	28
