= 2009 Imola Superbike World Championship round =

(Italy) 2009 Imola Superbike World Championship round
Round details
- Round 12 of 14 rounds in the 2009 Superbike World Championship. and Round 12 of 14 rounds in the 2009 Supersport World Championship.
- Date: September 27, 2009
- Location: Autodromo Enzo e Dino Ferrari
- Course: Permanent racing facility 4.936 km (3.067 mi)

Superbike World Championship
Pole position
(Italy) Michel Fabrizio
1:47.735
| Fastest lap race 1 | Fastest lap race 2 |
| (Italy) Michel Fabrizio | (Japan) Noriyuki Haga |
| 1:49.282 | 1:48.982 |

Supersport World Championship
Pole position
(United Kingdom) Cal Crutchlow
1:50.680
Fastest lap
(United Kingdom) Cal Crutchlow
1:51.645

The 2009 Imola Superbike World Championship round was the twelfth round of the 2009 Superbike World Championship season. It took place on the weekend of September 25–27, 2009, at the Imola circuit.

== Results ==
=== Superbike race 1 classification ===
| Pos | No | Rider | Manufacturer | Laps | Time | Grid | Points |
|---|---|---|---|---|---|---|---|
| 1 | 41 | (Japan) Noriyuki Haga | Ducati 1098R | 21 | 38:32.199 | 4 | 25 |
| 2 | 3 | (Italy) Max Biaggi | Aprilia RSV4 | 21 | +2.074 | 6 | 20 |
| 3 | 84 | (Italy) Michel Fabrizio | Ducati 1098R | 21 | +2.190 | 1 | 16 |
| 4 | 19 | (United States) Ben Spies | Yamaha YZF-R1 | 21 | +5.438 | 2 | 13 |
| 5 | 9 | (Japan) Ryuichi Kiyonari | Honda CBR1000RR | 21 | +14.470 | 14 | 11 |
| 6 | 91 | (United Kingdom) Leon Haslam | Honda CBR1000RR | 21 | +14.685 | 10 | 10 |
| 7 | 65 | (United Kingdom) Jonathan Rea | Honda CBR1000RR | 21 | +26.822 | 3 | 9 |
| 8 | 96 | (Czech Republic) Jakub Smrž | Ducati 1098R | 21 | +32.694 | 5 | 8 |
| 9 | 66 | (United Kingdom) Tom Sykes | Yamaha YZF-R1 | 21 | +33.817 | 16 | 7 |
| 10 | 23 | (Australia) Broc Parkes | Kawasaki ZX-10R | 21 | +34.801 | 18 | 6 |
| 11 | 11 | (Australia) Troy Corser | BMW S1000RR | 21 | +35.286 | 9 | 5 |
| 12 | 111 | (Spain) Rubén Xaus | BMW S1000RR | 21 | +36.442 | 19 | 4 |
| 13 | 31 | (Australia) Karl Muggeridge | Suzuki GSX-R1000 K9 | 21 | +38.698 | 20 | 3 |
| 14 | 15 | (Italy) Matteo Baiocco | Ducati 1098R | 21 | +42.147 | 22 | 2 |
| 15 | 71 | (Japan) Yukio Kagayama | Suzuki GSX-R1000 K9 | 21 | +46.510 | 17 | 1 |
| 16 | 99 | (Italy) Luca Scassa | Kawasaki ZX-10R | 21 | +46.628 | 23 | |
| 17 | 94 | (Spain) David Checa | Yamaha YZF-R1 | 21 | +1:16.121 | 25 | |
| 18 | 25 | (Spain) David Salom | Kawasaki ZX-10R | 21 | +1:16.398 | 26 | |
| Ret | 77 | (Italy) Vittorio Iannuzzo | Honda CBR1000RR | 13 | Retirement | 27 | |
| Ret | 58 | (Italy) Marco Simoncelli | Aprilia RSV4 | 9 | Accident | 8 | |
| Ret | 67 | (United Kingdom) Shane Byrne | Ducati 1098R | 8 | Accident | 7 | |
| Ret | 7 | (Spain) Carlos Checa | Honda CBR1000RR | 7 | Accident | 13 | |
| Ret | 10 | (Spain) Fonsi Nieto | Ducati 1098R | 7 | Retirement | 12 | |
| Ret | 100 | (Japan) Makoto Tamada | Kawasaki ZX-10R | 5 | Accident | 21 | |
| Ret | 124 | (Italy) Luca Conforti | Ducati 1098R | 5 | Accident | 24 | |
| Ret | 14 | (France) Matthieu Lagrive | Honda CBR1000RR | 3 | Accident | 15 | |
| Ret | 57 | (Italy) Lorenzo Lanzi | Ducati 1098R | 2 | Mechanical | 11 | |

=== Superbike race 2 classification ===
| Pos | No | Rider | Manufacturer | Laps | Time | Grid | Points |
|---|---|---|---|---|---|---|---|
| 1 | 84 | (Italy) Michel Fabrizio | Ducati 1098R | 21 | 38:23.143 | 1 | 25 |
| 2 | 41 | (Japan) Noriyuki Haga | Ducati 1098R | 21 | +3.592 | 4 | 20 |
| 3 | 58 | (Italy) Marco Simoncelli | Aprilia RSV4 | 21 | +6.510 | 8 | 16 |
| 4 | 3 | (Italy) Max Biaggi | Aprilia RSV4 | 21 | +7.445 | 6 | 13 |
| 5 | 19 | (United States) Ben Spies | Yamaha YZF-R1 | 21 | +14.678 | 2 | 11 |
| 6 | 65 | (United Kingdom) Jonathan Rea | Honda CBR1000RR | 21 | +16.396 | 3 | 10 |
| 7 | 67 | (United Kingdom) Shane Byrne | Ducati 1098R | 21 | +17.110 | 7 | 9 |
| 8 | 91 | (United Kingdom) Leon Haslam | Honda CBR1000RR | 21 | +22.502 | 10 | 8 |
| 9 | 96 | (Czech Republic) Jakub Smrž | Ducati 1098R | 21 | +25.268 | 5 | 7 |
| 10 | 7 | (Spain) Carlos Checa | Honda CBR1000RR | 21 | +30.203 | 13 | 6 |
| 11 | 57 | (Italy) Lorenzo Lanzi | Ducati 1098R | 21 | +32.589 | 11 | 5 |
| 12 | 66 | (United Kingdom) Tom Sykes | Yamaha YZF-R1 | 21 | +36.243 | 16 | 4 |
| 13 | 111 | (Spain) Rubén Xaus | BMW S1000RR | 21 | +36.368 | 19 | 3 |
| 14 | 31 | (Australia) Karl Muggeridge | Suzuki GSX-R1000 K9 | 21 | +38.809 | 20 | 2 |
| 15 | 23 | (Australia) Broc Parkes | Kawasaki ZX-10R | 21 | +42.435 | 18 | 1 |
| 16 | 15 | (Italy) Matteo Baiocco | Ducati 1098R | 21 | +49.349 | 22 | |
| 17 | 9 | (Japan) Ryuichi Kiyonari | Honda CBR1000RR | 21 | +1:01.823 | 14 | |
| 18 | 99 | (Italy) Luca Scassa | Kawasaki ZX-10R | 21 | +1:06.854 | 23 | |
| Ret | 14 | (France) Matthieu Lagrive | Honda CBR1000RR | 16 | Retirement | 15 | |
| Ret | 94 | (Spain) David Checa | Yamaha YZF-R1 | 14 | Retirement | 25 | |
| Ret | 71 | (Japan) Yukio Kagayama | Suzuki GSX-R1000 K9 | 12 | Retirement | 17 | |
| Ret | 10 | (Spain) Fonsi Nieto | Ducati 1098R | 11 | Retirement | 12 | |
| Ret | 77 | (Italy) Vittorio Iannuzzo | Honda CBR1000RR | 9 | Retirement | 27 | |
| Ret | 11 | (Australia) Troy Corser | BMW S1000RR | 4 | Retirement | 9 | |
| Ret | 25 | (Spain) David Salom | Kawasaki ZX-10R | 3 | Retirement | 26 | |
| DNS | 100 | (Japan) Makoto Tamada | Kawasaki ZX-10R | | Injured | 21 | |
| DNS | 124 | (Italy) Luca Conforti | Ducati 1098R | | Injured | 24 | |

=== Supersport race classification ===
| Pos | No | Rider | Manufacturer | Laps | Time | Grid | Points |
|---|---|---|---|---|---|---|---|
| 1 | 54 | (Turkey) Kenan Sofuoğlu | Honda CBR600RR | 19 | 35:51.342 | 2 | 25 |
| 2 | 50 | (Republic of Ireland) Eugene Laverty | Honda CBR600RR | 19 | +5.372 | 7 | 20 |
| 3 | 99 | (France) Fabien Foret | Yamaha YZF-R6 | 19 | +6.450 | 8 | 16 |
| 4 | 23 | (United Kingdom) Chaz Davies | Triumph Daytona 675 | 19 | +15.847 | 11 | 13 |
| 5 | 24 | (Australia) Garry McCoy | Triumph Daytona 675 | 19 | +15.944 | 5 | 11 |
| 6 | 1 | (Australia) Andrew Pitt | Honda CBR600RR | 19 | +16.001 | 9 | 10 |
| 7 | 21 | (Japan) Katsuaki Fujiwara | Kawasaki ZX-6R | 19 | +27.097 | 12 | 9 |
| 8 | 13 | (Australia) Anthony West | Honda CBR600RR | 19 | +27.835 | 15 | 8 |
| 9 | 117 | (Portugal) Miguel Praia | Honda CBR600RR | 19 | +32.846 | 13 | 7 |
| 10 | 9 | (Italy) Danilo Dell'Omo | Honda CBR600RR | 19 | +33.315 | 14 | 6 |
| 11 | 51 | (Italy) Michele Pirro | Yamaha YZF-R6 | 19 | +33.576 | 10 | 5 |
| 12 | 33 | (Italy) Cristiano Migliorati | Kawasaki ZX-6R | 19 | +44.958 | 20 | 4 |
| 13 | 199 | (France) Olivier Four | Honda CBR600RR | 19 | +59.645 | 23 | 3 |
| 14 | 77 | (Netherlands) Barry Veneman | Honda CBR600RR | 19 | +1:06.270 | 16 | 2 |
| 15 | 40 | (Italy) Flavio Gentile | Honda CBR600RR | 19 | +1:14.735 | 22 | 1 |
| 16 | 28 | (Netherlands) Arie Vos | Honda CBR600RR | 19 | +1:18.933 | 24 | |
| 17 | 34 | (Italy) Emanuele Russo | Yamaha YZF-R6 | 19 | +1:25.012 | 26 | |
| Ret | 35 | (United Kingdom) Cal Crutchlow | Yamaha YZF-R6 | 16 | Accident | 1 | |
| Ret | 26 | (Spain) Joan Lascorz | Kawasaki ZX-6R | 10 | Mechanical | 3 | |
| Ret | 5 | (Indonesia) Doni Tata Pradita | Yamaha YZF-R6 | 10 | Accident | 21 | |
| Ret | 47 | (Italy) Luca Pedersoli | Triumph Daytona 675 | 8 | Retirement | 27 | |
| Ret | 55 | (Italy) Massimo Roccoli | Honda CBR600RR | 6 | Accident | 4 | |
| Ret | 22 | (Romania) Robert Mureșan | Triumph Daytona 675 | 4 | Retirement | 25 | |
| Ret | 16 | (United Kingdom) Sam Lowes | Honda CBR600RR | 2 | Accident | 19 | |
| Ret | 25 | (United Kingdom) Michael Laverty | Honda CBR600RR | 1 | Accident | 17 | |
| Ret | 8 | (Australia) Mark Aitchison | Honda CBR600RR | 0 | Accident | 6 | |
| DNS | 127 | (Denmark) Robbin Harms | Honda CBR600RR | | Not started | 18 | |
| DNS | 30 | (Germany) Jesco Günther | Honda CBR600RR | | Not started | 28 | |
| DNS | 74 | (United Kingdom) Glenn Irwin | Honda CBR600RR | | Not started | 30 | |

== Superstock 1000 race ==
Both Ayrton Badovini and Federico Sandi were disqualified after the race for technical infringement.

| Pos. | No. | Rider | Bike | Laps | Time/Retired | Grid | Points |
|---|---|---|---|---|---|---|---|
| 1 | 19 | (Belgium) Xavier Simeon | Ducati 1098R | 12 | 22:40.939 | 2 | 25 |
| 2 | 71 | (Italy) Claudio Corti | Suzuki GSX-R1000 K9 | 12 | +1.689 | 3 | 20 |
| 3 | 119 | (Italy) Michele Magnoni | Yamaha YZF-R1 | 12 | +4.947 | 4 | 16 |
| 4 | 29 | (Italy) Daniele Beretta | Ducati 1098R | 12 | +13.737 | 7 | 13 |
| 5 | 53 | (Germany) Dominic Lammert | Suzuki GSX-R1000 K9 | 12 | +16.487 | 9 | 11 |
| 6 | 73 | (Italy) Simone Saltarelli | Suzuki GSX-R1000 K9 | 12 | +17.4031 | 20 | 10 |
| 7 | 41 | (Italy) Lorenzo Baroni | Yamaha YZF-R1 | 12 | +17.661 | 12 | 9 |
| 8 | 69 | (Czech Republic) Ondřej Ježek | Honda CBR1000RR | 12 | +26.448 | 22 | 8 |
| 9 | 112 | (Spain) Javier Forés | Kawasaki ZX-10R | 12 | +29.235 | 14 | 7 |
| 10 | 65 | (France) Loris Baz | Yamaha YZF-R1 | 12 | +32.603 | 11 | 6 |
| 11 | 22 | (United Kingdom) Alex Lowes | MV Agusta F4 312 R | 12 | +35.135 | 15 | 5 |
| 12 | 7 | (Austria) René Mähr | Suzuki GSX-R1000 K9 | 12 | +35.330 | 24 | 4 |
| 13 | 84 | (Italy) Fabio Massei | Yamaha YZF-R1 | 12 | +36.006 | 17 | 3 |
| 14 | 30 | (Switzerland) Michaël Savary | Honda CBR1000RR | 12 | +36.058 | 21 | 2 |
| 15 | 39 | (France) Julien Millet | Yamaha YZF-R1 | 12 | +41.732 | 28 | 1 |
| 16 | 20 | (France) Sylvain Barrier | Yamaha YZF-R1 | 12 | +44.709 | 5 | |
| 17 | 16 | (Netherlands) Raymond Schouten | Yamaha YZF-R1 | 12 | +46.327 | 26 | |
| 18 | 91 | (Sweden) Hampus Johansson | Yamaha YZF-R1 | 12 | +57.468 | 32 | |
| 19 | 57 | (Norway) Kim Arne Sletten | Yamaha YZF-R1 | 12 | +57.485 | 34 | |
| 20 | 11 | (Spain) Pere Tutusaus | KTM RC8 R | 12 | +1:01.112 | 35 | |
| 21 | 12 | (Italy) Nico Vivarelli | KTM RC8 R | 12 | +1:08.846 | 31 | |
| 22 | 64 | (Brazil) Danilo Andric | Yamaha YZF-R1 | 12 | +1:09.030 | 36 | |
| 23 | 14 | (Italy) Federico Biaggi | Aprilia RSV4 Factory | 12 | +1:09.149 | 27 | |
| 24 | 56 | (Slovakia) Tomáš Svitok | MV Agusta F4 312 R | 12 | +1:16.607 | 37 | |
| 25 | 191 | (Slovakia) Tomáš Krajčí | Honda CBR1000RR | 12 | +1:16.899 | 39 | |
| 26 | 36 | (Brazil) Philippe Thiriet | Honda CBR1000RR | 12 | +1:22.818 | 38 | |
| DSQ | 23 | (Italy) Federico Sandi | Aprilia RSV4 Factory | 12 | (+20.563) | 10 | |
| DSQ | 81 | (Italy) Ayrton Badovini | Aprilia RSV4 Factory | 11 | (+1 lap) | 1 | |
| Ret | 8 | (Italy) Andrea Antonelli | Yamaha YZF-R1 | 11 | Accident | 8 | |
| Ret | 63 | (Sweden) Per Björk | Honda CBR1000RR | 11 | Accident | 30 | |
| Ret | 111 | (Spain) Ismael Ortega | Kawasaki ZX-10R | 10 | Technical problem | 23 | |
| Ret | 51 | (Spain) Santiago Barragán | Honda CBR1000RR | 9 | Retirement | 18 | |
| Ret | 86 | (France) Loïc Napoleone | Yamaha YZF-R1 | 8 | Retirement | 19 | |
| Ret | 117 | (Italy) Denis Sacchetti | Honda CBR1000RR | 7 | Retirement | 16 | |
| Ret | 34 | (Italy) Davide Giugliano | Suzuki GSX-R1000 K9 | 5 | Retirement | 13 | |
| Ret | 131 | (Italy) Patrizio Valsecchi | Yamaha YZF-R1 | 3 | Accident | 29 | |
| Ret | 93 | (France) Mathieu Lussiana | Yamaha YZF-R1 | 3 | Technical problem | 33 | |
| Ret | 21 | (France) Maxime Berger | Honda CBR1000RR | 0 | Technical problem | 6 | |
| Ret | 77 | (United Kingdom) Barry Burrell | Honda CBR1000RR | 0 | Retirement | 25 | |
| DNQ | 141 | (Italy) Gabriele Perri | Honda CBR1000RR | | Did not qualify | | |

== Superstock 600 race classification ==
| Pos. | No. | Rider | Bike | Laps | Time/Retired | Grid | Points |
|---|---|---|---|---|---|---|---|
| 1 | 47 | (Italy) Eddi La Marra | Honda CBR600RR | 10 | 19:36.935 | 5 | 25 |
| 2 | 4 | (United Kingdom) Gino Rea | Honda CBR600RR | 10 | +0.286 | 6 | 20 |
| 3 | 5 | (Italy) Marco Bussolotti | Yamaha YZF-R6 | 10 | +0.715 | 2 | 16 |
| 4 | 9 | (Italy) Danilo Petrucci | Yamaha YZF-R6 | 10 | +0.988 | 1 | 13 |
| 5 | 11 | (France) Jérémy Guarnoni | Yamaha YZF-R6 | 10 | +9.605 | 7 | 11 |
| 6 | 55 | (Italy) Vincent Lonbois | Yamaha YZF-R6 | 10 | +11.034 | 9 | 10 |
| 7 | 133 | (Italy) Giuliano Gregorini | Yamaha YZF-R6 | 10 | +11.203 | 7 | 9 |
| 8 | 40 | (Italy) Roberto Tamburini | Yamaha YZF-R6 | 10 | +11.237 | 3 | 8 |
| 9 | 28 | (Italy) Ferruccio Lamborghini | Yamaha YZF-R6 | 10 | +14.591 | 10 | 7 |
| 10 | 21 | (France) Florian Marino | Honda CBR600RR | 10 | +18.348 | 11 | 6 |
| 11 | 72 | (Norway) Fredrik Karlsen | Yamaha YZF-R6 | 10 | +18.429 | 15 | 5 |
| 12 | 19 | (Italy) Nico Morelli | Honda CBR600RR | 10 | +21.243 | 8 | 4 |
| 13 | 89 | (Austria) Stefan Kerschbaumer | Yamaha YZF-R6 | 10 | +21.612 | 14 | 3 |
| 14 | 7 | (France) Baptiste Guittet | Honda CBR600RR | 10 | +21.656 | 12 | 2 |
| 15 | 36 | (Poland) Andrzej Chmielewski | Yamaha YZF-R6 | 10 | +27.195 | 13 | 1 |
| 16 | 12 | (Italy) Riccardo Cecchini | Honda CBR600RR | 10 | +36.727 | 16 | |
| 17 | 39 | (France) Randy Pagaud | Honda CBR600RR | 10 | +42.584 | 20 | |
| 18 | 23 | (Switzerland) Christian Von Gunten | Suzuki GSX-R600 | 10 | +43.366 | 19 | |
| 19 | 17 | (Croatia) Luca Nervo | Yamaha YZF-R6 | 10 | +44.833 | 18 | |
| 20 | 35 | (Italy) Nicola Jr. Morrentino | Yamaha YZF-R6 | 10 | +52.194 | 23 | |
| 21 | 99 | (Czech Republic) Michal Salač | Yamaha YZF-R6 | 10 | +54.181 | 24 | |
| 22 | 22 | (Italy) Raffaele Vargas | Honda CBR600RR | 10 | +55.772 | 25 | |
| 23 | 31 | (Italy) Marco Ferroni | Kawasaki ZX-6R | 10 | +55.841 | 22 | |
| 24 | 26 | (Romania) Mircea Vrăjitoru | Yamaha YZF-R6 | 10 | +56.652 | 21 | |
| 25 | 81 | (Czech Republic) David Látr | Honda CBR600RR | 10 | +1:21.354 | 26 | |
| 26 | 30 | (Romania) Bogdan Vrăjitoru | Yamaha YZF-R6 | 10 | +1:44.058 | 27 | |
| Ret | 25 | (Italy) Roberto Farinelli | Yamaha YZF-R6 | 0 | Retirement | 17 | |
