= 2009 Assen Superbike World Championship round =

(Netherlands) 2009 Assen Superbike World Championship round
Round details
- Round 4 of 14 rounds in the 2009 Superbike World Championship. and Round 4 of 14 rounds in the 2009 Supersport World Championship.
- Date: April 26, 2009
- Location: Assen
- Course: Permanent racing facility 4.555 km (2.830 mi)

Superbike World Championship
Pole position
(United States) Ben Spies
1:37.626
Fastest lap race 1	Fastest lap race 2
(United Kingdom) Leon Haslam	(Japan) Noriyuki Haga
1:38.730	1:38.680

Supersport World Championship
Pole position
(United Kingdom) Cal Crutchlow
1:40.313
Fastest lap
(United Kingdom) Cal Crutchlow
1:40.836

The 2009 Assen Superbike World Championship round will be the fourth round of the 2009 Superbike World Championship season. It took place on the weekend of April 24–26, 2009 at the TT Circuit Assen located in Assen, Netherlands.

== Results ==
=== Superbike race 1 ===
Pos	No	Rider	Bike	Laps	Time	Grid	Points
1	19	(United States) Ben Spies	Yamaha YZF-R1	22	36:31.338	1	25
2	41	(Japan) Noriyuki Haga	Ducati 1098R	22	+0.154	4	20
3	91	(United Kingdom) Leon Haslam	Honda CBR1000RR	22	+0.779	3	16
4	66	(United Kingdom) Tom Sykes	Yamaha YZF-R1	22	+8.775	8	13
5	3	(Italy) Max Biaggi	Aprilia RSV 4	22	+11.275	10	11
6	96	(Czech Republic) Jakub Smrž	Ducati 1098R	22	+16.126	2	10
7	65	(United Kingdom) Jonathan Rea	Honda CBR1000RR	22	+19.555	11	9
8	55	(France) Régis Laconi	Ducati 1098R	22	+19.760	12	8
9	84	(Italy) Michel Fabrizio	Ducati 1098R	22	+23.006	5	7
10	11	(Australia) Troy Corser	BMW S1000RR	22	+24.285	15	6
11	67	(United Kingdom) Shane Byrne	Ducati 1098R	22	+26.003	14	5
12	31	(Australia) Karl Muggeridge	Suzuki GSX-R1000 K9	22	+27.814	13	4
13	76	(Germany) Max Neukirchner	Suzuki GSX-R1000 K9	22	+36.962	6	3
14	111	(Spain) Ruben Xaus	BMW S1000RR	22	+39.025	20	2
15	9	(Japan) Ryuichi Kiyonari	Honda CBR1000RR	22	+41.505	16	1
16	24	(Australia) Brendan Roberts	Ducati 1098R	22	+41.810	18	
17	100	(Japan) Makoto Tamada	Kawasaki ZX-10R	22	+50.186	25	
18	32	(United Kingdom) Stuart Easton	Kawasaki ZX-10R	22	+55.567	23	
19	94	(Spain) David Checa	Yamaha YZF-R1	22	+56.425	21	
20	25	(Spain) David Salom	Kawasaki ZX-10R	22	+1:05.169	22	
21	88	(Austria) Roland Resch	Suzuki GSX-R1000 K9	22	+1:37.663	28	
Ret	99	(Italy) Luca Scassa	Kawasaki ZX-10R	18	Mechanical	27	
Ret	56	(Japan) Shinya Nakano	Aprilia RSV 4	13	Accident	19	
Ret	77	(Italy) Vittorio Iannuzzo	Honda CBR1000RR	13	Retirement	24	
Ret	15	(Italy) Matteo Baiocco	Kawasaki ZX-10R	12	Retirement	26	
Ret	7	(Spain) Carlos Checa	Honda CBR1000RR	4	Accident	7	
Ret	71	(Japan) Yukio Kagayama	Suzuki GSX-R1000 K9	1	Accident	9	
Ret	33	(United Kingdom) Tommy Hill	Honda CBR1000RR	0	Accident	17	

=== Superbike race 2 ===
Pos	No	Rider	Bike	Laps	Time	Grid	Points
1	41	(Japan) Noriyuki Haga	Ducati 1098R	22	36:31.712	4	25
2	91	(United Kingdom) Leon Haslam	Honda CBR1000RR	22	+2.678	3	20
3	96	(Czech Republic) Jakub Smrž	Ducati 1098R	22	+4.603	2	16
4	84	(Italy) Michel Fabrizio	Ducati 1098R	22	+8.981	5	13
5	65	(United Kingdom) Jonathan Rea	Honda CBR1000RR	22	+12.104	11	11
6	66	(United Kingdom) Tom Sykes	Yamaha YZF-R1	22	+14.575	8	10
7	7	(Spain) Carlos Checa	Honda CBR1000RR	22	+17.449	7	9
8	67	(United Kingdom) Shane Byrne	Ducati 1098R	22	+17.729	14	8
9	76	(Germany) Max Neukirchner	Suzuki GSX-R1000 K9	22	+18.167	6	7
10	11	(Australia) Troy Corser	BMW S1000RR	22	+25.056	15	6
11	111	(Spain) Ruben Xaus	BMW S1000RR	22	+32.617	20	5
12	71	(Japan) Yukio Kagayama	Suzuki GSX-R1000 K9	22	+32.688	9	4
13	24	(Australia) Brendan Roberts	Ducati 1098R	22	+37.415	18	3
14	15	(Italy) Matteo Baiocco	Kawasaki ZX-10R	22	+55.088	26	2
15	99	(Italy) Luca Scassa	Kawasaki ZX-10R	22	+55.325	27	1
16	55	(France) Régis Laconi	Ducati 1098R	22	+1:18.514	12	
17	88	(Austria) Roland Resch	Suzuki GSX-R1000 K9	22	+1:30.780	28	
Ret	33	(United Kingdom) Tommy Hill	Honda CBR1000RR	20	Mechanical	17	
Ret	100	(Japan) Makoto Tamada	Kawasaki ZX-10R	10	Retirement	25	
Ret	9	(Japan) Ryuichi Kiyonari	Honda CBR1000RR	7	Mechanical	16	
Ret	94	(Spain) David Checa	Yamaha YZF-R1	5	Accident	21	
Ret	25	(Spain) David Salom	Kawasaki ZX-10R	5	Retirement	22	
Ret	31	(Australia) Karl Muggeridge	Suzuki GSX-R1000 K9	3	Accident	13	
Ret	32	(United Kingdom) Stuart Easton	Kawasaki ZX-10R	3	Accident	23	
Ret	19	(United States) Ben Spies	Yamaha YZF-R1	1	Accident	1	
Ret	77	(Italy) Vittorio Iannuzzo	Honda CBR1000RR	1	Mechanical	24	
Ret	3	(Italy) Max Biaggi	Aprilia RSV 4	1	Mechanical	10	
DNS	56	(Japan) Shinya Nakano	Aprilia RSV 4		Injured	19	

=== Supersport race ===
Pos	No	Rider	Bike	Laps	Time	Grid	Points
1	50	(Republic of Ireland) Eugene Laverty	Honda CBR600RR	21	35:45.160	4	25
2	35	(United Kingdom) Cal Crutchlow	Yamaha YZF-R6	21	+0.107	1	20
3	26	(Spain) Joan Lascorz	Kawasaki ZX-6R	21	+0.178	2	16
4	99	(France) Fabien Foret	Yamaha YZF-R6	21	+1.777	5	13
5	54	(Turkey) Kenan Sofuoğlu	Honda CBR600RR	21	+1.901	3	11
6	8	(Australia) Mark Aitchison	Honda CBR600RR	21	+5.492	12	10
7	13	(Australia) Anthony West	Honda CBR600RR	21	+12.551	8	9
8	77	(Netherlands) Barry Veneman	Suzuki GSX-R600	21	+12.841	11	8
9	127	(Denmark) Robbin Harms	Honda CBR600RR	21	+13.567	9	7
10	51	(Italy) Michele Pirro	Yamaha YZF-R6	21	+19.657	7	6
11	7	(Czech Republic) Patrik Vostárek	Honda CBR600RR	21	+24.316	17	5
12	69	(Italy) Gianluca Nannelli	Triumph Daytona 675	21	+25.803	19	4
13	55	(Italy) Massimo Roccoli	Honda CBR600RR	21	+26.255	13	3
14	21	(Japan) Katsuaki Fujiwara	Kawasaki ZX-6R	21	+26.439	15	2
15	24	(Australia) Garry McCoy	Triumph Daytona 675	21	+44.902	6	1
16	28	(Netherlands) Arie Vos	Honda CBR600RR	21	+52.814	20	
17	83	(Australia) Russell Holland	Honda CBR600RR	21	+52.959	21	
18	9	(Italy) Danilo dell'Omo	Honda CBR600RR	21	+58.793	22	
19	57	(Netherlands) Kevin Bos	Yamaha YZF-R6	21	+1:04.653	28	
20	94	(Netherlands) Marcel van Nieuwenhuizen	Yamaha YZF-R6	21	+1:08.049	29	
21	32	(Italy) Fabrizio Lai	Honda CBR600RR	21	+1:08.111	25	
22	88	(Spain) Yannick Guerra	Yamaha YZF-R6	21	+1:08.389	30	
23	27	(Netherlands) Twan van Poppel	Yamaha YZF-R6	21	+1:25.061	31	
Ret	53	(Italy) Alex Polita	Suzuki GSX-R600	19	Mechanical	24	
Ret	117	(Portugal) Miguel Praia	Honda CBR600RR	16	Retirement	16	
Ret	1	(Australia) Andrew Pitt	Honda CBR600RR	15	Accident	10	
Ret	105	(Italy) Gianluca Vizziello	Honda CBR600RR	14	Retirement	18	
Ret	30	(Germany) Jesco Günther	Honda CBR600RR	10	Retirement	23	
Ret	14	(France) Matthieu Lagrive	Honda CBR600RR	4	Accident	14	
Ret	5	(Indonesia) Doni Tata Pradita	Yamaha YZF-R6	3	Retirement	26	
Ret	96	(Czech Republic) Matej Smrž	Triumph Daytona 675	2	Retirement	27	

== Superstock 1000 race classification ==
Pos.	No.	Rider	Bike	Laps	Time/Retired	Grid	Points
1	21	(France) Maxime Berger	Honda CBR1000RR	13	22:19.407	1	25
2	19	(Belgium) Xavier Simeon	Ducati 1098R	13	+3.431	9	20
3	20	(France) Sylvain Barrier	Yamaha YZF-R1	13	+4.240	3	16
4	112	(Spain) Javier Forés	Kawasaki ZX-10R	13	+4.369	7	13
5	71	(Italy) Claudio Corti	Suzuki GSX-R1000 K9	13	+7.504	4	11
6	65	(France) Loris Baz	Yamaha YZF-R1	13	+10.191	5	10
7	87	(Australia) Gareth Jones	Yamaha YZF-R1	13	+10.604	13	9
8	34	(Italy) Davide Giugliano	MV Agusta F4 312 R	13	+11.050	2	8
9	77	(United Kingdom) Barry Burrell	Honda CBR1000RR	13	+11.287	6	7
10	16	(Netherlands) Raymond Schouten	Yamaha YZF-R1	13	+11.378	8	6
11	29	(Italy) Daniele Beretta	Ducati 1098R	13	+18.964	20	5
12	8	(Italy) Andrea Antonelli	Yamaha YZF-R1	13	+20.246	10	4
13	69	(Czech Republic) Ondřej Ježek	Honda CBR1000RR	13	+20.811	19	3
14	53	(Germany) Dominic Lammert	Suzuki GSX-R1000 K9	13	+21.381	16	2
15	111	(Spain) Ismael Ortega	Kawasaki ZX-10R	13	+21.498	17	1
16	7	(Austria) René Mähr	Suzuki GSX-R1000 K9	13	+21.868	11	
17	119	(Italy) Michele Magnoni	Yamaha YZF-R1	13	+22.719	14	
18	35	(Netherlands) Allard Kerkhoven	Yamaha YZF-R1	13	+23.394	25	
19	5	(Netherlands) Danny De Boer	Yamaha YZF-R1	13	+23.784	21	
20	46	(United Kingdom) Tommy Bridewell	Yamaha YZF-R1	13	+26.965	26	
21	25	(United Kingdom) Gregg Black	Yamaha YZF-R1	13	+28.241	22	
22	51	(Spain) Santiago Barragán	Honda CBR1000RR	13	+30.458	18	
23	2	(Italy) Luca Morelli	Kawasaki ZX-10R	13	+31.643	23	
24	86	(France) Loïc Napoleone	Suzuki GSX-R1000 K9	13	+36.205	12	
25	44	(Hungary) Balázs Németh	Honda CBR1000RR	13	+36.955	40	
26	91	(Sweden) Hampus Johansson	Yamaha YZF-R1	13	+40.076	27	
27	72	(France) Nicolas Pouhair	Yamaha YZF-R1	13	+45.824	31	
28	63	(Sweden) Per Björk	Honda CBR1000RR	13	+46.530	28	
29	23	(Italy) Federico Sandi	Aprilia RSV4 Factory	13	+46.705	32	
30	11	(Spain) Pere Tutusaus	KTM RC8 R	13	+48.241	33	
31	12	(Italy) Nico Vivarelli	Honda CBR1000RR	13	+1:17.713	38	
32	36	(Brazil) Philippe Thiriet	Honda CBR1000RR	13	+1:22.681	34	
33	66	(Poland) Mateusz Stoklosa	Honda CBR1000RR	13	+1:24.660	39	
Ret	30	(Switzerland) Michaël Savary	Honda CBR1000RR	11	Retirement	24	
Ret	107	(Italy) Niccolò Rosso	Yamaha YZF-R1	8	Retirement	36	
Ret	22	(United Kingdom) Alex Lowes	MV Agusta F4 312 R	8	Retirement	15	
Ret	14	(Italy) Federico Biaggi	Aprilia RSV4 Factory	6	Accident	37	
Ret	93	(France) Mathieu Lussiana	Yamaha YZF-R1	4	Retirement	29	
Ret	117	(Italy) Denis Sacchetti	KTM RC8 R	2	Technical problem	30	
Ret	64	(Brazil) Danilo Andric	Yamaha YZF-R1	2	Accident	35	

== Superstock 600 race classification ==
Pos.	No.	Rider	Bike	Laps	Time/Retired	Grid	Points
1	4	(United Kingdom) Gino Rea	Honda CBR600RR	10	17:36.124	5	25
2	37	(Netherlands) Joey Litjens	Yamaha YZF-R6	10	+0.363	2	20
3	11	(France) Jérémy Guarnoni	Yamaha YZF-R6	10	+4.877	11	16
4	89	(Austria) Stefan Kerschbaumer	Yamaha YZF-R6	10	+10.028	6	13
5	47	(Italy) Eddi La Marra	Honda CBR600RR	10	+12.345	7	11
6	13	(Italy) Dino Lombardi	Kawasaki ZX-6R	10	+13.139	8	10
7	7	(France) Baptiste Guittet	Honda CBR600RR	10	+15.734	10	9
8	34	(Netherlands) Kevin Van Leuven	Yamaha YZF-R6	10	+16.738	12	8
9	36	(Poland) Andrzej Chmielewski	Yamaha YZF-R6	10	+17.375	9	7
10	19	(Italy) Nico Morelli	Honda CBR600RR	10	+17.853	14	6
11	91	(Netherlands) Alex Ott	Yamaha YZF-R6	10	+18.127	13	5
12	12	(Italy) Riccardo Cecchini	Honda CBR600RR	10	+28.240	16	4
13	23	(Switzerland) Christian Von Gunten	Suzuki GSX-R600	10	+31.546	15	3
14	119	(Netherlands) Jardo Van Huisstede	Suzuki GSX-R600	10	+44.833	17	2
15	132	(Italy) Daniele Manfrinati	Honda CBR600RR	10	+53.374	19	1
16	10	(Spain) Nacho Calero	Yamaha YZF-R6	10	+53.498	20	
17	81	(Czech Republic) David Látr	Honda CBR600RR	10	+58.199	18	
18	26	(Romania) Mircea Vrăjitoru	Yamaha YZF-R6	10	+1:31.789	21	
19	30	(Romania) Bogdan Vrăjitoru	Yamaha YZF-R6	10	+1:56.419	22	
Ret	55	(Belgium) Vincent Lonbois	Yamaha YZF-R6	9	Accident	3	
Ret	9	(Italy) Danilo Petrucci	Yamaha YZF-R6	8	Retirement	1	
Ret	5	(Italy) Marco Bussolotti	Yamaha YZF-R6	7	Accident	4	
