= Luís Carreira =

Portuguese motorcycle racer

Luis Carreira
- Nationality: Portuguese
- Born: 31 December 1976; Lisbon, Portugal
- Died: 15 November 2012 (aged 35); Macau
- Current team: Team Benimoto Suzuki Cetelem
- Bike number: 1
- Website: luiscarreira.com

Luis Filipe de Sousa Carreira (31 December 1976 – 15 November 2012) was a Portuguese motorcycle road racer. He died on 15 November 2012 after an accident during qualifying in the 2012 Macau Motorcycle Grand Prix.

== Career highlights ==
- 1998 – 1st place in Troféu Super CBR 600 (Portuguese championship)
- 2000 – 2nd place in Troféu Honda Hornet (Portuguese championship)
- 2001 – 1st place in Troféu Honda CBR 600 (Portuguese championship)
- 2002 – 7th place in Portuguese Stocksport 1000 (Portuguese championship)
- 2003 – 3rd place in Portuguese Stocksport 1000 (Portuguese championship)
- 2004 – 4th place in Portuguese Stocksport 1000 (Portuguese championship)
- 2004 – 21st place in GP Macau
- 2005 – 1st place in I GP Internacional de Angola
- 2005 – 2nd place in II GP Internacional de Angola
- 2004 – 3rd place in Portuguese Stocksport 1000 (Portuguese championship)
- 2006 – 14th place in GP Macau
- 2007 – 1st place in Troféu Resistência Vodafone (Portuguese Trophy)
- 2007 – 9th place in GP Macau
- 2007 – 2nd place in Portuguese Stocksport 1000 (Portuguese championship)
- 2008 – 1st place in Portuguese Stocksport 1000 (Portuguese championship)
- 2008 – 4th place in GP Macau
- 2008 – Wild Card at WSBK Portimão
- 2009 – 1st place in Portuguese Stocksport 1000 (Portuguese championship)
- 2009 – 1st place in Troféu Resistência Vodafone (Portuguese Trophy)
- 2009 – 8th place in GP Macau
- 2009 – 12th place in Albacete European Championship
- 2009 – 18th place in Sénior Isle of Man TT (Best Rookie)
- 2010 – 1st place in Portuguese Stocksport 1000 (Portuguese championship)
- 2010 – 1st place in Resistência Estoril 500 km – Angotruck
- 2010 – 17th place in Sénior Isle of Man TT (Superstock class)
- 2010 – 22nd place in Sénior Isle of Man TT (Superbike class)
- 2011 – 11th place in NW 200 (Best Rookie)
- 2011 – 13th place in Isle of Man TT (Superstock class)
- 2011 – 16th place in Isle of Man TT (Supersport class)
