= Federico Biaggi =

Italian motorcycle racer

- Nationality: Italian
- Born: 24 October 1987 (age 39); Rome, Italy
Motorcycle racing career statistics
125cc World Championship
Active years	2007
Manufacturers	Friba
Starts / Wins / Podiums / Poles / F. laps / Points; 1 / 0 / 0 / 0 / 0 / 0

Federico Mandatori, also known as Federico Biaggi, is a Grand Prix motorcycle racer from Italy. He is Max Biaggi's nephew.

== Career statistics ==
- 2009 - 32nd, FIM Superstock 1000 Cup, Aprilia RSV4
- 2012 - NC, FIM Superstock 1000 Cup, Suzuki GSX-R1000

=== Grand Prix motorcycle racing ===
==== By season ====
Season	Class	Motorcycle	Team	Number	Race	Win	Podium	Pole	FLap	Pts	Plcd
2007	125cc	Friba	Friba	80	1	0	0	0	0	0	NC
Total					**1**	**0**	**0**	**0**	**0**	**0**	

==== Races by year ====
Year	Class	Bike	1	2	3	4	5	6	7	8	9	10	11	12	13	14	15	16	17	Pos	Points
2007	125cc	Friba	QAT	SPA	TUR	CHN	FRA	ITA	CAT	GBR	NED	GER	CZE	RSM; 32	POR	JPN	AUS	MAL	VAL	NC	0

=== FIM Superstock 1000 Cup ===
==== Races by year ====
(key) (Races in bold indicate pole position) (Races in italics indicate fastest lap)

Year	Bike	1	2	3	4	5	6	7	8	9	10	Pos	Pts
2009	Aprilia	VAL; Ret	NED; Ret	MNZ; 12	SMR; 24	DON; DNS	BRN; 24	NŰR	IMO; 23	MAG	ALG; 26	32nd	4
2012	Suzuki	IMO	NED	MNZ	SMR; 23	ARA	BRN	SIL	NŰR	ALG	MAG	NC	0
