= 2011 Monza Superbike World Championship round =

(Italy) 2011 Monza Superbike World Championship round
Round details
- Round 4 of 13 rounds in the 2011 Superbike World Championship. and Round 4 of 12 rounds in the 2011 Supersport World Championship.
- Date: May 8, 2011
- Location: Monza
- Course: Permanent racing facility 5.777 km (3.590 mi)

Superbike World Championship
Pole position
(Italy) Max Biaggi
1:41.745
| Fastest lap race 1 | Fastest lap race 2 |
| (Italy) Michel Fabrizio | (Italy) Max Biaggi |
| 1:43.275 | 1:43.023 |

Supersport World Championship
Pole position
(United Kingdom) Chaz Davies
1:47.809
Fastest lap
(United Kingdom) Chaz Davies
1:48.526

The 2011 Monza Superbike World Championship round was the fourth round of the 2011 Superbike World Championship. It took place on the weekend of May 6–8, 2011 at the Autodromo Nazionale Monza located in Monza, Italy.

== Results ==
=== Superbike race 1 classification ===
| Pos. | No. | Rider | Bike | Laps | Time/Retired | Grid | Points |
|---|---|---|---|---|---|---|---|
| 1 | 58 | (Republic of Ireland) Eugene Laverty | Yamaha YZF R1 | 18 | 31:09.584 | 2 | 25 |
| 2 | 1 | (Italy) Max Biaggi | Aprilia RSV4 Factory | 18 | +1.575 | 1 | 20 |
| 3 | 91 | (United Kingdom) Leon Haslam | BMW S1000RR | 18 | +3.078 | 6 | 16 |
| 4 | 33 | (Italy) Marco Melandri | Yamaha YZF R1 | 18 | +3.255 | 5 | 13 |
| 5 | 84 | (Italy) Michel Fabrizio | Suzuki GSX-R1000 | 18 | +11.812 | 7 | 11 |
| 6 | 4 | (United Kingdom) Jonathan Rea | Honda CBR1000RR | 18 | +12.371 | 3 | 10 |
| 7 | 11 | (Australia) Troy Corser | BMW S1000RR | 18 | +13.280 | 4 | 9 |
| 8 | 2 | (United Kingdom) Leon Camier | Aprilia RSV4 Factory | 18 | +17.419 | 10 | 8 |
| 9 | 7 | (Spain) Carlos Checa | Ducati 1098R | 18 | +17.569 | 11 | 7 |
| 10 | 96 | (Czech Republic) Jakub Smrž | Ducati 1098R | 18 | +18.420 | 15 | 6 |
| 11 | 86 | (Italy) Ayrton Badovini | BMW S1000RR | 18 | +20.031 | 9 | 5 |
| 12 | 50 | (France) Sylvain Guintoli | Ducati 1098R | 18 | +20.405 | 12 | 4 |
| 13 | 66 | (United Kingdom) Tom Sykes | Kawasaki ZX 10R | 18 | +26.693 | 14 | 3 |
| 14 | 121 | (France) Maxime Berger | Ducati 1098R | 18 | +38.429 | 16 | 2 |
| 15 | 111 | (Spain) Rubén Xaus | Honda CBR1000RR | 18 | +40.164 | 17 | 1 |
| 16 | 41 | (Japan) Noriyuki Haga | Aprilia RSV4 Factory | 18 | +49.081 | 8 | |
| 17 | 8 | (Australia) Mark Aitchison | Kawasaki ZX 10R | 18 | +57.930 | 19 | |
| 18 | 32 | (Italy) Fabrizio Lai | Honda CBR1000RR | 18 | +1:03.039 | 20 | |
| Ret | 17 | (Spain) Joan Lascorz | Kawasaki ZX 10R | 9 | Accident | 13 | |
| Ret | 44 | (Italy) Roberto Rolfo | Kawasaki ZX 10R | 6 | Retirement | 18 | |
| DNS | 52 | (United Kingdom) James Toseland | BMW S1000RR | | Did not start | | |
| DNS | 77 | (Australia) Chris Vermeulen | Kawasaki ZX 10R | | Did not start | | |
OFFICIAL SUPERBIKE RACE 1 REPORT

=== Superbike race 2 classification ===
| Pos. | No. | Rider | Bike | Laps | Time/Retired | Grid | Points |
|---|---|---|---|---|---|---|---|
| 1 | 58 | (Republic of Ireland) Eugene Laverty | Yamaha YZF R1 | 18 | 31:19.948 | 2 | 25 |
| 2 | 33 | (Italy) Marco Melandri | Yamaha YZF R1 | 18 | +0.327 | 5 | 20 |
| 3 | 84 | (Italy) Michel Fabrizio | Suzuki GSX-R1000 | 18 | +2.466 | 7 | 16 |
| 4 | 41 | (Japan) Noriyuki Haga | Aprilia RSV4 Factory | 18 | +2.583 | 8 | 13 |
| 5 | 11 | (Australia) Troy Corser | BMW S1000RR | 18 | +4.502 | 4 | 11 |
| 6 | 86 | (Italy) Ayrton Badovini | BMW S1000RR | 18 | +10.865 | 9 | 10 |
| 7 | 50 | (France) Sylvain Guintoli | Ducati 1098R | 18 | +11.038 | 12 | 9 |
| 8 | 1 | (Italy) Max Biaggi | Aprilia RSV4 Factory | 18 | +18.724 | 1 | 8 |
| 9 | 17 | (Spain) Joan Lascorz | Kawasaki ZX 10R | 18 | +20.093 | 13 | 7 |
| 10 | 7 | (Spain) Carlos Checa | Ducati 1098R | 18 | +20.376 | 11 | 6 |
| 11 | 66 | (United Kingdom) Tom Sykes | Kawasaki ZX 10R | 18 | +21.111 | 14 | 5 |
| 12 | 111 | (Spain) Rubén Xaus | Honda CBR1000RR | 18 | +28.608 | 17 | 4 |
| 13 | 44 | (Italy) Roberto Rolfo | Kawasaki ZX 10R | 18 | +33.459 | 18 | 3 |
| 14 | 8 | (Australia) Mark Aitchison | Kawasaki ZX 10R | 18 | +42.810 | 19 | 2 |
| 15 | 32 | (Italy) Fabrizio Lai | Honda CBR1000RR | 18 | +55.759 | 20 | 1 |
| Ret | 121 | (France) Maxime Berger | Ducati 1098R | 13 | Retirement | 16 | |
| Ret | 2 | (United Kingdom) Leon Camier | Aprilia RSV4 Factory | 7 | Accident | 10 | |
| Ret | 96 | (Czech Republic) Jakub Smrž | Ducati 1098R | 0 | Accident | 15 | |
| Ret | 91 | (United Kingdom) Leon Haslam | BMW S1000RR | 0 | Accident | 6 | |
| Ret | 4 | (United Kingdom) Jonathan Rea | Honda CBR1000RR | 0 | Accident | 3 | |
| DNS | 52 | (United Kingdom) James Toseland | BMW S1000RR | | Did not start | | |
| DNS | 77 | (Australia) Chris Vermeulen | Kawasaki ZX 10R | | Did not start | | |
OFFICIAL SUPERBIKE RACE 2 REPORT

=== Supersport race classification ===
| Pos. | No. | Rider | Bike | Laps | Time/Retired | Grid | Points |
|---|---|---|---|---|---|---|---|
| 1 | 7 | (United Kingdom) Chaz Davies | Yamaha YZF-R6 | 16 | 29:05.363 | 1 | 25 |
| 2 | 9 | (Italy) Luca Scassa | Yamaha YZF-R6 | 16 | +4.734 | 6 | 20 |
| 3 | 99 | (France) Fabien Foret | Honda CBR600RR | 16 | +7.977 | 4 | 16 |
| 4 | 23 | (Australia) Broc Parkes | Kawasaki ZX-6R | 16 | +19.246 | 3 | 13 |
| 5 | 11 | (United Kingdom) Sam Lowes | Honda CBR600RR | 16 | +19.882 | 2 | 11 |
| 6 | 22 | (Italy) Roberto Tamburini | Yamaha YZF-R6 | 16 | +20.148 | 5 | 10 |
| 7 | 21 | (France) Florian Marino | Honda CBR600RR | 16 | +21.090 | 7 | 9 |
| 8 | 44 | (Spain) David Salom | Kawasaki ZX-6R | 16 | +31.595 | 14 | 8 |
| 9 | 55 | (Italy) Massimo Roccoli | Kawasaki ZX-6R | 16 | +31.599 | 10 | 7 |
| 10 | 127 | (Denmark) Robbin Harms | Honda CBR600RR | 16 | +35.406 | 12 | 6 |
| 11 | 91 | (Italy) Danilo Dell'Omo | Triumph Daytona 675 | 16 | +35.564 | 16 | 5 |
| 12 | 32 | (Italy) Mirko Giansanti | Kawasaki ZX-6R | 16 | +35.946 | 13 | 4 |
| 13 | 25 | (Slovenia) Marko Jerman | Triumph Daytona 675 | 16 | +1:00.245 | 25 | 3 |
| 14 | 38 | (Hungary) Balázs Németh | Honda CBR600RR | 16 | +1:00.256 | 22 | 2 |
| 15 | 87 | (Italy) Luca Marconi | Yamaha YZF-R6 | 16 | +1:00.528 | 21 | 1 |
| 16 | 77 | (United Kingdom) James Ellison | Honda CBR600RR | 16 | +1:03.395 | 8 | |
| 17 | 34 | (South Africa) Ronan Quarmby | Triumph Daytona 675 | 16 | +1:12.021 | 26 | |
| 18 | 19 | (Australia) Mitchell Pirotta | Honda CBR600RR | 16 | +1:17.015 | 27 | |
| 19 | 5 | (Sweden) Alexander Lundh | Honda CBR600RR | 16 | +1:37.501 | 20 | |
| 20 | 33 | (Austria) Yves Polzer | Yamaha YZF-R6 | 16 | +1:45.103 | 28 | |
| 21 | 24 | (Russia) Eduard Blokhin | Yamaha YZF-R6 | 15 | +1 lap | 31 | |
| 22 | 30 | (Russia) Valery Yurchenko | Yamaha YZF-R6 | 15 | +1 lap | 30 | |
| 23 | 80 | (Italy) Giovanni Altomonte | Honda CBR600RR | 15 | +1 lap | 29 | |
| Ret | 60 | (Ukraine) Vladimir Ivanov | Honda CBR600RR | 15 | Accident | 18 | |
| Ret | 31 | (Italy) Vittorio Iannuzzo | Kawasaki ZX-6R | 15 | Accident | 19 | |
| Ret | 95 | (Romania) Robert Mureșan | Honda CBR600RR | 14 | Retirement | 24 | |
| Ret | 4 | (United Kingdom) Gino Rea | Honda CBR600RR | 9 | Accident | 9 | |
| Ret | 117 | (Portugal) Miguel Praia | Honda CBR600RR | 8 | Accident | 11 | |
| Ret | 73 | (Russia) Oleg Pozdneev | Yamaha YZF-R6 | 8 | Retirement | 32 | |
| Ret | 28 | (Poland) Paweł Szkopek | Honda CBR600RR | 7 | Retirement | 23 | |
| Ret | 10 | (Hungary) Imre Tóth | Honda CBR600RR | 4 | Retirement | 17 | |
| DSQ | 69 | (Czech Republic) Ondřej Ježek | Honda CBR600RR | 16 | Disqualified | 15 | |
OFFICIAL SUPERSPORT RACE REPORT

=== Superstock 1000 race classification ===
The race was stopped after 4 laps due to oil spillage at turn 4, the race was later restarted and shortened to 5 laps.

| Pos. | No. | Rider | Bike | Laps | Time/Retired | Grid | Points |
|---|---|---|---|---|---|---|---|
| 1 | 87 | (Italy) Lorenzo Zanetti | BMW S1000RR | 5 | 8:56.130 | 4 | 25 |
| 2 | 34 | (Italy) Davide Giugliano | Ducati 1098R | 5 | +0.065 | 1 | 20 |
| 3 | 119 | (Italy) Michele Magnoni | BMW S1000RR | 5 | +1.728 | 3 | 16 |
| 4 | 9 | (Italy) Danilo Petrucci | Ducati 1098R | 5 | +3.634 | 7 | 13 |
| 5 | 15 | (Italy) Fabio Massei | BMW S1000RR | 5 | +4.750 | 11 | 11 |
| 6 | 21 | (Germany) Markus Reiterberger | BMW S1000RR | 5 | +9.341 | 10 | 10 |
| 7 | 5 | (Italy) Marco Bussolotti | Kawasaki ZX-10R | 5 | +9.418 | 8 | 9 |
| 8 | 8 | (Italy) Andrea Antonelli | Honda CBR1000RR | 5 | +10.734 | 12 | 8 |
| 9 | 59 | (Italy) Niccolò Canepa | Kawasaki ZX-10R | 5 | +10.845 | 17 | 7 |
| 10 | 93 | (France) Mathieu Lussiana | BMW S1000RR | 5 | +10.915 | 20 | 6 |
| 11 | 23 | (Italy) Luca Verdini | Honda CBR1000RR | 5 | +12.033 | 16 | 5 |
| 12 | 91 | (Italy) Riccardo Fusco | BMW S1000RR | 5 | +16.451 | 19 | 4 |
| 13 | 6 | (Italy) Lorenzo Savadori | Kawasaki ZX-10R | 5 | +16.750 | 18 | 3 |
| 14 | 29 | (Italy) Daniele Beretta | Honda CBR1000RR | 5 | +16.792 | 23 | 2 |
| 15 | 86 | (Australia) Beau Beaton | BMW S1000RR | 5 | +19.120 | 25 | 1 |
| 16 | 40 | (Hungary) Alen Győrfi | Honda CBR1000RR | 5 | +20.956 | 29 | |
| 17 | 55 | (Slovakia) Tomáš Svitok | Ducati 1098R | 5 | +21.145 | 27 | |
| 18 | 58 | (Switzerland) Gabriel Berclaz | Honda CBR1000RR | 5 | +22.541 | 28 | |
| 19 | 12 | (Italy) Nico Vivarelli | Kawasaki ZX-10R | 5 | +22.550 | 24 | |
| 20 | 27 | (Switzerland) Thomas Caiani | Kawasaki ZX-10R | 5 | +24.579 | 30 | |
| 21 | 71 | (Netherlands) Roy Ten Napel | Honda CBR1000RR | 5 | +24.605 | 26 | |
| 22 | 89 | (Czech Republic) Michal Salač | BMW S1000RR | 5 | +31.467 | 32 | |
| 23 | 30 | (Romania) Bogdan Vrăjitoru | Yamaha YZF-R1 | 5 | +39.845 | 33 | |
| Ret | 14 | (Italy) Lorenzo Baroni | Ducati 1098R | | Accident | 6 | |
| Ret | 11 | (France) Jérémy Guarnoni | Yamaha YZF-R1 | | Accident | 15 | |
| DNS | 39 | (France) Randy Pagaud | BMW S1000RR | 0 | Accident (original attempt) | 22 | |
| DNS | 37 | (Italy) Andrea Boscoscuro | Ducati 1098R | 0 | Acicdent (original attempt) | 21 | |
| DNS | 36 | (Argentina) Leandro Mercado | Kawasaki ZX-10R | 0 | Accident (original attempt) | 14 | |
| DNS | 47 | (Italy) Eddi La Marra | Honda CBR1000RR | 0 | Accident (original attempt) | 13 | |
| DNS | 32 | (South Africa) Sheridan Morais | Kawasaki ZX-10R | 0 | Accident (original attempt) | 9 | |
| DNS | 20 | (France) Sylvain Barrier | BMW S1000RR | 0 | Retirement (original attempt) | 2 | |
| DNS | 120 | (Poland) Marcin Walkowiak | Honda CBR1000RR | 0 | Retirement (original attempt) | 31 | |
| DNS | 67 | (Australia) Bryan Staring | Kawasaki ZX-10R | 0 | Accident (original attempt) | 5 | |
| DNS | 141 | (Portugal) Sérgio Batista | Kawasaki ZX-10R | 0 | Acicdent (original attempt) | 34 | |
OFFICIAL SUPERSTOCK 1000 MONZA RACE REPORT

== Superstock 600 race classification ==
| Pos. | No. | Rider | Bike | Laps | Time/Retired | Grid | Points |
|---|---|---|---|---|---|---|---|
| 1 | 98 | (France) Romain Lanusse | Yamaha YZF-R6 | 10 | 18:43.803 | 1 | 25 |
| 2 | 13 | (Italy) Dino Lombardi | Yamaha YZF-R6 | 10 | +6.167 | 4 | 20 |
| 3 | 4 | (United States) Joshua Day | Kawasaki ZX-6R | 10 | +6.662 | 14 | 16 |
| 4 | 12 | (Italy) Franco Morbidelli | Yamaha YZF-R6 | 10 | +6.665 | 9 | 13 |
| 5 | 84 | (Italy) Riccardo Russo | Yamaha YZF-R6 | 10 | +6.685 | 2 | 11 |
| 6 | 33 | (Italy) Giuliano Gregorini | Yamaha YZF-R6 | 10 | +6.829 | 3 | 10 |
| 7 | 70 | (Italy) Luca Vitali | Yamaha YZF-R6 | 10 | +7.500 | 10 | 9 |
| 8 | 69 | (France) Nelson Major | Yamaha YZF-R6 | 10 | +8.398 | 6 | 8 |
| 9 | 10 | (Spain) Nacho Calero | Yamaha YZF-R6 | 10 | +8.446 | 8 | 7 |
| 10 | 60 | (Netherlands) Michael Van Der Mark | Honda CBR600RR | 10 | +10.774 | 11 | 6 |
| 11 | 415 | (Italy) Federico Dittadi | Yamaha YZF-R6 | 10 | +14.150 | 13 | 5 |
| 12 | 99 | (Netherlands) Tony Coveña | Yamaha YZF-R6 | 10 | +20.789 | 20 | 4 |
| 13 | 52 | (Belgium) Gauthier Duwelz | Yamaha YZF-R6 | 10 | +20.847 | 19 | 3 |
| 14 | 8 | (United Kingdom) Joshua Elliott | Yamaha YZF-R6 | 10 | +20.912 | 26 | 2 |
| 15 | 43 | (France) Stéphane Egea | Yamaha YZF-R6 | 10 | +22.137 | 16 | 1 |
| 16 | 19 | (Slovakia) Tomáš Krajči | Yamaha YZF-R6 | 10 | +30.857 | 23 | |
| 17 | 26 | (Romania) Mircea Vrajitoru | Yamaha YZF-R6 | 10 | +32.137 | 25 | |
| 18 | 92 | (Australia) Adrian Nestorovic | Yamaha YZF-R6 | 10 | +32.266 | 24 | |
| 19 | 64 | (Italy) Riccardo Cecchini | Triumph Daytona 675 | 10 | +32.821 | 27 | |
| 20 | 71 | (United Kingdom) Max Wadsworth | Yamaha YZF-R6 | 10 | +1:09.383 | 28 | |
| 21 | 3 | (Australia) Jed Metcher | Yamaha YZF-R6 | 10 | +1:11.312 | 18 | |
| 22 | 56 | (United States) Austin Dehaven | Yamaha YZF-R6 | 10 | +1:23.757 | 15 | |
| 23 | 23 | (Luxembourg) Christophe Ponsson | Yamaha YZF-R6 | 10 | +1:24.371 | 22 | |
| 24 | 78 | (Netherlands) Tristan Lentink | Honda CBR600RR | 10 | 1:30.936 | 29 | |
| Ret | 18 | (Italy) Christian Gamarino | Kawasaki ZX-6R | 4 | Accident | 7 | |
| Ret | 17 | (Italy) Luca Salvadori | Yamaha YZF-R6 | 3 | Accident | 21 | |
| Ret | 77 | (Italy) Stefano Casalotti | Yamaha YZF-R6 | 3 | Retirement | 12 | |
| Ret | 75 | (Italy) Francesco Cocco | Yamaha YZF-R6 | 0 | Accident | 5 | |
| Ret | 59 | (Denmark) Alex Schacht | Honda CBR600RR | 0 | Accident | 17 | |
OFFICIAL SUPERSTOCK 600 RACE REPORT
