= Jakub Smrž =

Czech motorcycle racer

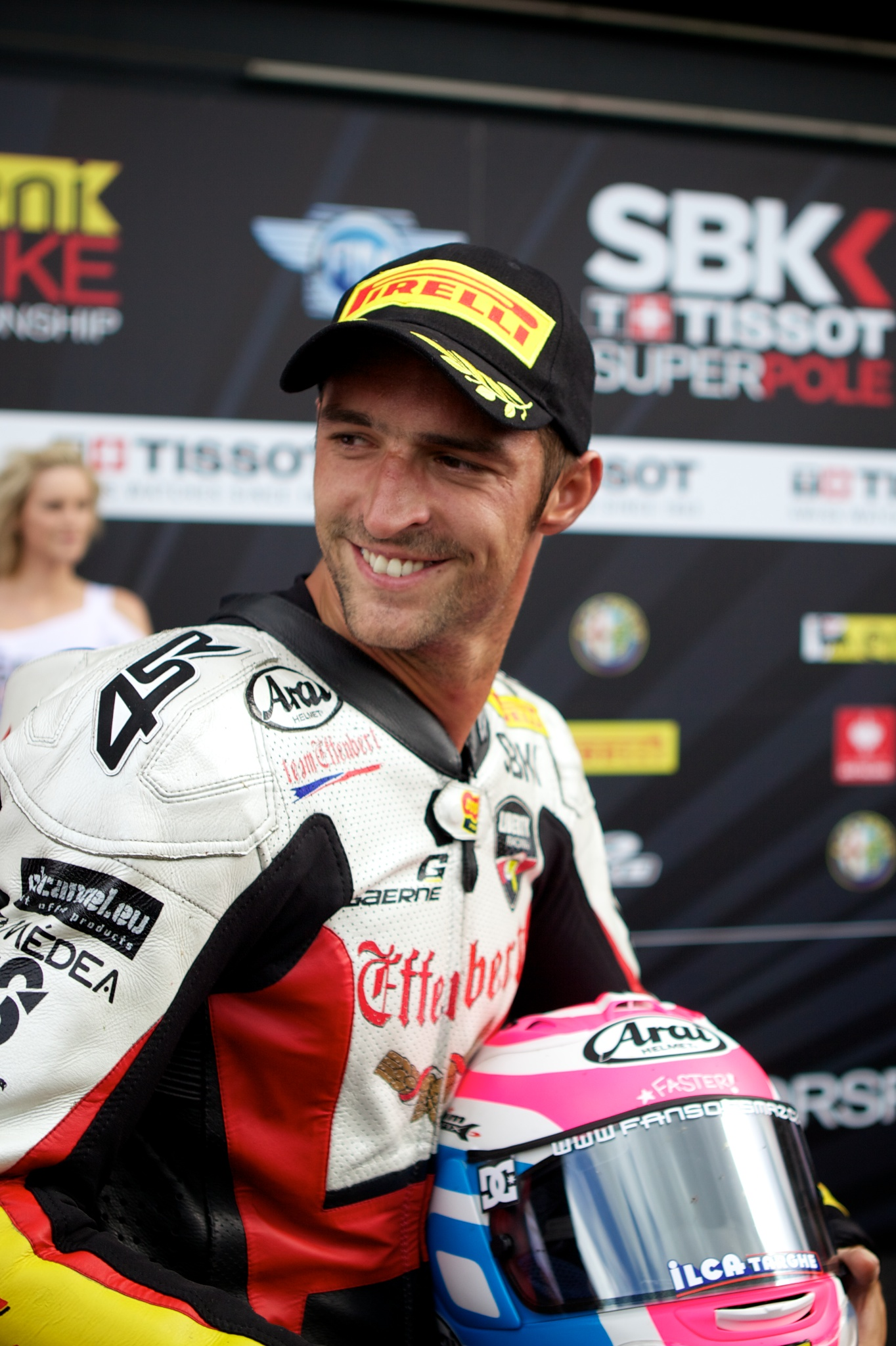
- Smrž at Silverstone in 2012
- Nationality: Czech
- Born: 7 April 1983 (age 43); České Budějovice, Czechoslovakia
- Current team: Guandalini Racing
- Bike number: 96
- Website: fansofsmrz.cz
Motorcycle racing career statistics
250cc World Championship
Active years	2002–2006
Manufacturers	Honda, Aprilia
Starts / Wins / Podiums / Poles / F. laps / Points; 66 / 0 / 0 / 0 / 0 / 112
125cc World Championship
Active years	1998–2002
Manufacturers	Honda
Starts / Wins / Podiums / Poles / F. laps / Points; 27 / 0 / 0 / 0 / 0 / 58
Superbike World Championship
Active years	2007–2012, 2017–2018
Manufacturers	Ducati, Aprilia, Yamaha
Starts / Wins / Podiums / Poles / F. laps / Points; 158 / 0 / 5 / 3 / 2 / 684.5
British Superbike Championship
Active years	2012–2018
Manufacturers	Aprilia, Honda, Ducati, Yamaha, BMW
Starts / Wins / Podiums / Poles / F. laps / Points; 117 / 0 / 0 / 1 / 0 / 319

Jakub 'Kuba' Smrž (born 7 April 1983 in České Budějovice, Czechoslovakia) is a professional motorcycle road racer. He competed in the Superbike World Championship, aboard a Yamaha YZF-R1. For 2017 and 2018, he rode a BMW S1000RR in the British Superbike Championship, but in June 2018 he suffered a serious shoulder injury when guest-riding for Czech BMW team Mercury Racing in the Oschersleben eight-hour event in Germany. Luke Hedger rode Smrž' machine in his absence.

For 2015, Smrž was contracted to ride a Ducati Panigale in the British Superbike Championship for Moto Rapido Racing, but after a crash and injury in the fourth round at Snetterton, was replaced mid-season by John Hopkins. For the last three races of 2015, Smrž was drafted-in by Shaun Muir Racing to compete aboard a Yamaha YZF-R1. Smrž was the MEZ 125 Champion from 1998 to 2000.

== Career ==
Smrž first entered the 125cc World Championship in 2000. He was 17th overall in 2001, then divided his time between 125cc and the 250cc championships in 2002. He remained in the 250cc World Championship until 2006, finishing 12th overall with a best of seventh that year.

For 2007, Smrž was the surprise choice to replace Roberto Rolfo at the formerly race-winning SC Caracchi Ducati team in the Superbike World Championship. On a customer Ducati 999 F05, he frequently troubled the top sixteen in qualifying. He finished the season 14th with a best race result of eighth.

For 2008, Smrž rode a customer Ducati 1098 RS 08 for the Guandalini Racing by Grifo's team. He finished the 2008 season in 13th place in the championship.

For 2009, Smrž continued with the Guandalini Racing Team, gaining his first podium finish (third) in the fourth round of the season at Assen and first pole position in the eighth round at Misano Adriatico. This time, he finished tenth overall.

Smrž remained with the team in 2010, running under the B&G moniker after a partnership deal with the former Sterilgarda Ducati team. After a string of mechanical failures midseason, the team switched to an Aprilia bike, marking the first time Smrž had ridden anything other than a Ducati in the class. He was the fastest Aprilia in qualifying at Silverstone.

Smrž lives in Zlín.

== Career statistics ==
=== Grand Prix motorcycle racing ===
==== By season ====
Season	Class	Motorcycle	Team	Race	Win	Podium	Pole	FLap	Pts	Plcd
1998	125cc	Honda	Wernberger - Team Hanusch	1	0	0	0	0	0	NC
1999	125cc	Honda	Budweiser budvar elit hanush	1	0	0	0	0	0	NC
2000	125cc	Honda	Budweiser Budvar Elit Team Hanusch	2	0	0	0	0	5	28th
2001	125cc	Honda	Budweiser Budvar Hanusch	16	0	0	0	0	50	17th
2002	125cc	Honda	Elit Grand Prix	7	0	0	0	0	3	32nd
2002	250cc	Honda	DeGraaf Grand Prix Team	5	0	0	0	0	1	36th
2003	250cc	Honda	Elit Grand Prix	13	0	0	0	0	14	24th
2004	250cc	Honda	Molenaar Racing	16	0	0	0	0	20	20th
2005	250cc	Honda	Arie Molenaar Racing	16	0	0	0	0	19	20th
2006	250cc	Aprilia	Cardion AB Motoracing	16	0	0	0	0	58	12th
Total				**93**	**0**	**0**	**0**	**0**	**170**	

==== By class ====
Class	Seasons	1st GP	1st Pod	1st Win	Race	Win	Podiums	Pole	FLap	Pts	WChmp
125cc	1998–2002	1998 Czech Republic			27	0	0	0	0	58	0
250cc	2002–2006	2002 Rio de Janeiro			66	0	0	0	0	112	0
Total	1998–2006				**93**	**0**	**0**	**0**	**0**	**170**	**0**

==== Races by year ====
(key) (Races in bold indicate pole position) (Races in italics indicate fastest lap)

Year	Class	Bike	1	2	3	4	5	6	7	8	9	10	11	12	13	14	15	16	Pos	Pts
1998	125cc	Honda	JPN	MAL	SPA	ITA	FRA	MAD	NED	GBR	GER	CZE; Ret	IMO	CAT	AUS	ARG			NC	0
1999	125cc	Honda	MAL	JPN	SPA	FRA	ITA	CAT	NED	GBR	GER	CZE; 21	IMO	VAL	AUS	RSA	BRA	ARG	NC	0
2000	125cc	Honda	RSA	MAL	JPN	SPA	FRA	ITA	CAT	NED	GBR	GER; 18	CZE; 11	POR	VAL	BRA	PAC	AUS	28th	5
2001	125cc	Honda	JPN; 21	RSA; Ret	SPA; 15	FRA; 18	ITA; Ret	CAT; 19	NED; 5	GBR; 13	GER; 9	CZE; 6	POR; 6	VAL; 21	PAC; Ret	AUS; 19	MAL; Ret	BRA; 8	17th	50
2002	125cc	Honda	JPN; Ret	RSA; Ret	SPA; 13	FRA; Ret	ITA; Ret	CAT; 16	NED; 22	GBR	GER	CZE	POR						32nd	3
2002	250cc	Honda												BRA; 15	PAC; 24	MAL; 16	AUS; 17	VAL; Ret	36th	1
2003	250cc	Honda	JPN; 15	RSA; Ret	SPA; 17	FRA; 19	ITA; 14	CAT; Ret	NED; 12	GBR; 14	GER; 13	CZE; Ret	POR; Ret	BRA	PAC; 18	MAL	AUS	VAL; 14	24th	14
2004	250cc	Honda	RSA; 21	SPA; Ret	FRA; 11	ITA; Ret	CAT; 15	NED; Ret	BRA; Ret	GER; 15	GBR; 15	CZE; 14	POR; 14	JPN; Ret	QAT; 17	MAL; 14	AUS; 13	VAL; 13	20th	20
2005	250cc	Honda	SPA; Ret	POR; 12	CHN; 14	FRA; 16	ITA; Ret	CAT; Ret	NED; 16	GBR; 16	GER; 16	CZE; 11	JPN; Ret	MAL; 19	QAT; Ret	AUS; 13	TUR; 15	VAL; 12	20th	19
2006	250cc	Aprilia	SPA; Ret	QAT; 10	TUR; 7	CHN; 10	FRA; 10	ITA; Ret	CAT; Ret	NED; Ret	GBR; 11	GER; 14	CZE; 10	MAL; Ret	AUS; 8	JPN; Ret	POR; 11	VAL; 11	12th	58

=== Superbike World Championship ===
==== Races by year ====
(key) (Races in bold indicate pole position) (Races in italics indicate fastest lap)

Year	Bike	1		2		3		4		5		6		7		8		9		10		11		12		13		14		Pos	Pts
Year	Bike	R1	R2	R1	R2	R1	R2	R1	R2	R1	R2	R1	R2	R1	R2	R1	R2	R1	R2	R1	R2	R1	R2	R1	R2	R1	R2	R1	R2	Pos	Pts
2007	Ducati	QAT; 14	QAT; 16	AUS; 14	AUS; 11	EUR; 10	EUR; 8	SPA; 14	SPA; 17	NED; 11	NED; 9	ITA; 15	ITA; 10	GBR; Ret	GBR; C	SMR; 10	SMR; 13	CZE; Ret	CZE; 13	GBR; 14	GBR; Ret	GER; 13	GER; 16	ITA; 11	ITA; Ret	FRA; Ret	FRA; Ret			14th	66
2008	Ducati	QAT; 10	QAT; 9	AUS; Ret	AUS; 18	SPA; 14	SPA; 14	NED; 6	NED; 8	ITA; 10	ITA; Ret	USA; 6	USA; DSQ	GER; 11	GER; Ret	SMR; 7	SMR; 9	CZE; Ret	CZE; 11	GBR; 9	GBR; 9	EUR; 6	EUR; 12	ITA; 13	ITA; 11	FRA; Ret	FRA; 13	POR; Ret	POR; 12	13th	120
2009	Ducati	AUS; 9	AUS; 7	QAT; Ret	QAT; 17	SPA; Ret	SPA; 14	NED; 6	NED; 3	ITA; 12	ITA; 8	RSA; 14	RSA; 10	USA; 8	USA; 6	**SMR**; 4	**SMR**; 4	GBR; 9	GBR; Ret	CZE; 6	CZE; 9	GER; 13	GER; 11	ITA; 8	ITA; 9	FRA; 10	FRA; Ret	POR; Ret	POR; 8	10th	169
2010	Ducati	AUS; 8	AUS; Ret	POR; Ret	POR; Ret	SPA; 10	SPA; 10	NED; 7	NED; 7	ITA; 15	ITA; 8	RSA; 9	RSA; 9	USA; Ret	USA; Ret	SMR; Ret	SMR; Ret													13th	110
2010	Aprilia																	CZE; Ret	CZE; Ret	GBR; 13	GBR; 9	GER; Ret	GER; 11	ITA; 4	ITA; Ret	FRA; 5	FRA; 6			13th	110
2011	Ducati	AUS; 5	AUS; 11	EUR; 2	EUR; 8	NED; Ret	NED; 9	ITA; 10	ITA; Ret	USA; 2	USA; 8	SMR; Ret	SMR; Ret	SPA; Ret	SPA; Ret	CZE; 11	CZE; Ret	GBR; Ret	GBR; 11	GER; Ret	GER; 3	ITA; 7	ITA; Ret	FRA; Ret	FRA; Ret	POR; 10	POR; 13			14th	127
2012	Ducati	AUS; 5	AUS; 11	ITA; 11	ITA; 7	NED; 7	NED; Ret	ITA; C	ITA; 9	EUR; 13	EUR; Ret	**USA**; 6	**USA**; 9	SMR; 9	SMR; 9	SPA; Ret	SPA; DNS	CZE; 10	CZE; 13	**GBR**; 17	**GBR**; 3	RUS	RUS	GER	GER	POR	POR	FRA	FRA	15th	92.5
2017	Yamaha	AUS	AUS	THA	THA	SPA	SPA	NED	NED	ITA	ITA	GBR	GBR	ITA	ITA	USA; 18	USA; 16	GER	GER	POR	POR	FRA	FRA	SPA	SPA	QAT	QAT			NC	0
2018	Yamaha	AUS	AUS	THA	THA	SPA	SPA	NED	NED	ITA	ITA	GBR	GBR	CZE	CZE	USA	USA	ITA	ITA	POR; Ret	POR; Ret	FRA; Ret	FRA; Ret	ARG; Ret	ARG; Ret	QAT; DNS	QAT; C			NC	0

=== British Superbike Championship ===
==== Races by year ====
(key) (Races in bold indicate pole position) (Races in italics indicate fastest lap)

Year	Bike	1		2		3			4		5		6			7			8		9			10		11		12			Pos	Pts
Year	Bike	R1	R2	R1	R2	R1	R2	R3	R1	R2	R1	R2	R1	R2	R3	R1	R2	R3	R1	R2	R1	R2	R3	R1	R2	R1	R2	R1	R2	R3	Pos	Pts
2012	Aprilia	BHI	BHI	THR	THR	OUL	OUL	OUL	SNE	SNE	KNO	KNO	OUL	OUL	OUL	BHGP	BHGP		CAD	CAD	DON	DON		ASS; Ret	ASS; 15	SIL; Ret	SIL; 12	BHGP; 15	BHGP; 14	BHGP; 16	29th	8
2013	Honda	BHI; 13	BHI; 18	THR; 10	THR; 12	OUL; 12	OUL; 13		KNO; 13	KNO; Ret	SNE; 8	SNE; Ret	BHGP; 11	BHGP; Ret		OUL; 16	OUL; 17	OUL; 14	CAD; 15	CAD; 19	DON; 8	DON; 10		ASS; 6	ASS; Ret	SIL; 15	SIL; 10	BHGP; 16	BHGP; 9	BHGP; 11	15th	82
2014	Ducati	BHI; 9	BHI; Ret	OUL; 10	OUL; 11	SNE; Ret	SNE; 8		KNO; 12	KNO; 12	BHGP; 7	BHGP; Ret	**THR**; 6	THR; 13		OUL; 11	OUL; 12	OUL; 10	CAD; DNS	CAD; DNS	DON	DON		ASS	ASS	SIL	SIL	BHGP; 14	BHGP; 12	BHGP; 11	15th	82
2015	Ducati	DON; Ret	DON; 24	BHI; Ret	BHI; 21	OUL; 20	OUL; 19		SNE	SNE	KNO	KNO	BHGP	BHGP		THR	THR		CAD	CAD	OUL	OUL	OUL								24th	30
2015	Yamaha																							ASS; 16	ASS; 10	SIL; 10	SIL; 13	BHGP; 10	BHGP; 14	BHGP; 9	24th	30
2016	BMW	SIL; 15	SIL; 15	OUL; 18	OUL; 15	BHI; DNS	BHI; DNS		KNO; 16	KNO; Ret	SNE; 11	SNE; Ret	THR; 9	THR; 12		BHGP; Ret	BHGP; 14		CAD; 16	CAD; 18	OUL; 18	OUL; 18	OUL; 19	DON; 11	DON; 12	ASS; 14	ASS; 11	BHGP; 10	BHGP; 11	BHGP; Ret	18th	48
2017	BMW	DON; 14	DON; 15	BHI; 14	BHI; 15	OUL; 13	OUL; 12		KNO; 12	KNO; 16	SNE; Ret	SNE; 12	BHGP; DNS	BHGP; DNS		THR; 12	THR; 10		CAD; 17	CAD; 14	SIL; 8	SIL; 13	SIL; 5	OUL; 13	OUL; 13	ASS; 18	ASS; Ret	BHGP; 13	BHGP; 15	BHGP; 16	18th	65
2018	BMW	DON; DNS	DON; Ret	BHI; 14	BHI; 16	OUL; 14	OUL; Ret		SNE	SNE	KNO	KNO	BHGP	BHGP		THR	THR		CAD	CAD	SIL	SIL	SIL	OUL	OUL	ASS	ASS	BHGP	BHGP	BHGP	29th	4
