= 2011 Silverstone Superbike World Championship round =

(United Kingdom) 2011 Silverstone Superbike World Championship round
Round details
- Round 9 of 13 rounds in the 2011 Superbike World Championship. and Round 8 of 12 rounds in the 2011 Supersport World Championship.
- Date: July 31, 2011
- Location: Silverstone Circuit
- Course: Permanent racing facility 5.902 km (3.667 mi)

Superbike World Championship
Pole position
(United States) John Hopkins
2:04.041
Fastest lap race 1	Fastest lap race 2
(Spain) Carlos Checa	(Italy) Max Biaggi
2:06.045	2:05.525

Supersport World Championship
Pole position
(Spain) David Salom
2:08.527
Fastest lap
(Denmark) Robbin Harms
2:09.771

The 2011 Silverstone Superbike World Championship round was the ninth round of the 2011 Superbike World Championship. It took place on the weekend of July 29–31, 2011 at Silverstone Circuit, United Kingdom.

== Results ==
=== Superbike race 1 classification ===
Pos.	No.	Rider	Bike	Laps	Time/Retired	Grid	Points
1	7	(Spain) Carlos Checa	Ducati 1098R	18	38:06.477	4	25
2	58	(Republic of Ireland) Eugene Laverty	Yamaha YZF-R1	18	+3.304	2	20
3	33	(Italy) Marco Melandri	Yamaha YZF-R1	18	+4.782	6	16
4	91	(United Kingdom) Leon Haslam	BMW S1000RR	18	+7.116	9	13
5	211	(United States) John Hopkins	Suzuki GSX-R1000	18	+11.057	1	11
6	50	(France) Sylvain Guintoli	Ducati 1098R	18	+21.899	5	10
7	17	(Spain) Joan Lascorz	Kawasaki ZX-10R	18	+22.308	18	9
8	121	(France) Maxime Berger	Ducati 1098R	18	+22.734	15	8
9	11	(Australia) Troy Corser	BMW S1000RR	18	+25.491	16	7
10	86	(Italy) Ayrton Badovini	BMW S1000RR	18	+25.725	10	6
11	1	(Italy) Max Biaggi	Aprilia RSV4 Factory	18	+25.844	11	5
12	52	(United Kingdom) James Toseland	BMW S1000RR	18	+45.578	14	4
13	44	(Italy) Roberto Rolfo	Kawasaki ZX-10R	18	+51.650	19	3
14	10	(United Kingdom) Jon Kirkham	Suzuki GSX-R1000	18	+57.310	21	2
15	2	(United Kingdom) Leon Camier	Aprilia RSV4 Factory	18	+1:36.457	3	1
Ret	32	(Italy) Fabrizio Lai	Honda CBR1000RR	12	Accident	20	
Ret	8	(Australia) Mark Aitchison	Kawasaki ZX-10R	10	Accident	12	
Ret	41	(Japan) Noriyuki Haga	Aprilia RSV4 Factory	9	Accident	8	
Ret	96	(Czech Republic) Jakub Smrž	Ducati 1098R	6	Retirement	13	
Ret	22	(United Kingdom) Alex Lowes	Honda CBR1000RR	5	Accident	17	
Ret	84	(Italy) Michel Fabrizio	Suzuki GSX-R1000	0	Accident	7	
DNS	66	(United Kingdom) Tom Sykes	Kawasaki ZX-10R		Did not start		
OFFICIAL SUPERBIKE RACE 1 REPORT

=== Superbike race 2 classification ===
Pos.	No.	Rider	Bike	Laps	Time/Retired	Grid	Points
1	7	(Spain) Carlos Checa	Ducati 1098R	18	38:03.361	4	25
2	58	(Republic of Ireland) Eugene Laverty	Yamaha YZF-R1	18	+2.274	2	20
3	33	(Italy) Marco Melandri	Yamaha YZF-R1	18	+3.675	6	16
4	1	(Italy) Max Biaggi	Aprilia RSV4 Factory	18	+3.960	11	13
5	2	(United Kingdom) Leon Camier	Aprilia RSV4 Factory	18	+4.405	3	11
6	50	(France) Sylvain Guintoli	Ducati 1098R	18	+10.958	5	10
7	211	(United States) John Hopkins	Suzuki GSX-R1000	18	+11.387	1	9
8	91	(United Kingdom) Leon Haslam	BMW S1000RR	18	+11.496	9	8
9	84	(Italy) Michel Fabrizio	Suzuki GSX-R1000	18	+12.247	7	7
10	86	(Italy) Ayrton Badovini	BMW S1000RR	18	+19.705	10	6
11	96	(Czech Republic) Jakub Smrž	Ducati 1098R	18	+19.753	13	5
12	121	(France) Maxime Berger	Ducati 1098R	18	+21.582	15	4
13	52	(United Kingdom) James Toseland	BMW S1000RR	18	+27.235	14	3
14	8	(Australia) Mark Aitchison	Kawasaki ZX-10R	18	+30.702	12	2
15	10	(United Kingdom) Jon Kirkham	Suzuki GSX-R1000	18	+42.579	21	1
16	32	(Italy) Fabrizio Lai	Honda CBR1000RR	18	+43.420	20	
Ret	44	(Italy) Roberto Rolfo	Kawasaki ZX-10R	16	Retirement	19	
Ret	11	(Australia) Troy Corser	BMW S1000RR	12	Retirement	16	
Ret	22	(United Kingdom) Alex Lowes	Honda CBR1000RR	7	Retirement	17	
Ret	17	(Spain) Joan Lascorz	Kawasaki ZX-10R	6	Retirement	18	
Ret	41	(Japan) Noriyuki Haga	Aprilia RSV4 Factory	4	Retirement	8	
DNS	66	(United Kingdom) Tom Sykes	Kawasaki ZX-10R		Did not start		
OFFICIAL SUPERBIKE RACE 2 REPORT

=== Supersport race classification ===
Pos.	No.	Rider	Bike	Laps	Time/Retired	Grid	Points
1	7	(United Kingdom) Chaz Davies	Yamaha YZF-R6	16	34:55.198	8	25
2	44	(Spain) David Salom	Kawasaki ZX-6R	16	+1.085	1	20
3	99	(France) Fabien Foret	Honda CBR600RR	16	+2.449	6	16
4	22	(Italy) Roberto Tamburini	Yamaha YZF-R6	16	+8.319	10	13
5	55	(Italy) Massimo Roccoli	Kawasaki ZX-6R	16	+11.283	9	11
6	23	(Australia) Broc Parkes	Kawasaki ZX-6R	16	+12.308	7	10
7	38	(Hungary) Balázs Németh	Honda CBR600RR	16	+14.011	21	9
8	117	(Portugal) Miguel Praia	Honda CBR600RR	16	+14.814	13	8
9	21	(France) Florian Marino	Honda CBR600RR	16	+14.906	3	7
10	77	(United Kingdom) James Ellison	Honda CBR600RR	16	+17.635	16	6
11	4	(United Kingdom) Gino Rea	Honda CBR600RR	16	+25.109	4	5
12	9	(Italy) Luca Scassa	Yamaha YZF-R6	16	+25.230	11	4
13	5	(Sweden) Alexander Lundh	Honda CBR600RR	15	+25.430	12	3
14	34	(South Africa) Ronan Quarmby	Triumph Daytona 675	16	+33.084	20	2
15	31	(Italy) Vittorio Iannuzzo	Kawasaki ZX-6R	16	+43.631	15	1
16	60	(Ukraine) Vladimir Ivanov	Honda CBR600RR	16	+43.898	18	
17	10	(Hungary) Imre Tóth	Honda CBR600RR	16	+44.554	17	
18	69	(Czech Republic) Ondřej Ježek	Honda CBR600RR	16	+49.696	22	
19	88	(United Kingdom) Luke Stapleford	Kawasaki ZX-6R	16	+56.968	23	
20	8	(Switzerland) Bastien Chesaux	Honda CBR600RR	16	+1:02.743	25	
21	25	(Slovenia) Marko Jerman	Triumph Daytona 675	15	+1:16.259	27	
22	19	(Australia) Mitchell Pirotta	Honda CBR600RR	16	+1:45.117	26	
23	33	(Austria) Yves Polzer	Yamaha YZF-R6	16	+2:05.404	29	
24	24	(Russia) Eduard Blokhin	Yamaha YZF-R6	15	+1 lap	30	
NC	16	(Australia) Christian Casella	Triumph Daytona 675	8	+8 laps	28	
Ret	28	(Poland) Paweł Szkopek	Honda CBR600RR	10	Accident	19	
Ret	91	(Italy) Danilo Dell'Omo	Triumph Daytona 675	4	Retirement	14	
Ret	127	(Denmark) Robbin Harms	Honda CBR600RR	3	Accident	5	
Ret	87	(Italy) Luca Marconi	Yamaha YZF-R6	3	Retirement	24	
Ret	11	(United Kingdom) Sam Lowes	Honda CBR600RR	3	Retirement	2	
DNQ	73	(Russia) Oleg Pozdneev	Yamaha YZF-R6		Did not qualify		
OFFICIAL SUPERSPORT RACE REPORT

=== Superstock 1000 race classification ===
Pos.	No.	Rider	Bike	Laps	Time/Retired	Grid	Points
1	9	(Italy) Danilo Petrucci	Ducati 1098R	10	21:36.434	1	25
2	87	(Italy) Lorenzo Zanetti	BMW S1000RR	10	+3.431	4	20
3	59	(Italy) Niccolò Canepa	Ducati 1098R	10	+3.465	3	16
4	14	(Italy) Lorenzo Baroni	Ducati 1098R	10	+12.047	7	13
5	36	(Argentina) Leandro Mercado	Kawasaki ZX-10R	10	+14.270	6	11
6	21	(Germany) Markus Reiterberger	BMW S1000RR	10	+14.715	9	10
7	8	(Italy) Andrea Antonelli	Honda CBR1000RR	10	+18.739	12	9
8	32	(South Africa) Sheridan Morais	Kawasaki ZX-10R	10	+19.371	13	8
9	47	(Italy) Eddi La Marra	Honda CBR1000RR	10	+21.321	8	7
10	11	(France) Jérémy Guarnoni	Yamaha YZF-R1	10	+23.655	11	6
11	5	(Italy) Marco Bussolotti	Kawasaki ZX-10R	10	+23.868	14	5
12	67	(Australia) Bryan Staring	Kawasaki ZX-10R	10	+25.719	20	4
13	15	(Italy) Fabio Massei	BMW S1000RR	10	+28.520	18	3
14	83	(United Kingdom) Danny Buchan	Kawasaki ZX-10R	10	+31.149	15	2
15	93	(France) Mathieu Lussiana	BMW S1000RR	10	+37.464	16	1
16	303	(United Kingdom) Keith Farmer	Kawasaki ZX-10R	10	+39.528	17	
17	28	(Italy) Ferruccio Lamborghini	Honda CBR1000RR	10	+39.745	19	
18	23	(Italy) Luca Verdini	Kawasaki ZX-10R	10	+40.029	23	
19	40	(Hungary) Alen Győrfi	Honda CBR1000RR	10	+52.369	29	
20	55	(Slovakia) Tomáš Svitok	Ducati 1098R	10	+52.722	24	
21	120	(Poland) Marcin Walkowiak	Honda CBR1000RR	10	+52.942	26	
22	86	(Australia) Beau Beaton	BMW S1000RR	10	+53.308	21	
23	10	(United Kingdom) Lee Costello	Honda CBR1000RR	10	+53.580	27	
24	27	(Switzerland) Thomas Caiani	Kawasaki ZX-10R	10	+1:11.694	30	
25	89	(Czech Republic) Michal Salač	BMW S1000RR	10	+1:19.565	31	
26	6	(Italy) Lorenzo Savadori	Kawasaki ZX-10R	10	+1:59.429	10	
Ret	34	(Italy) Davide Giugliano	Ducati 1098R	8	Accident	2	
Ret	71	(Netherlands) Roy Ten Napel	Honda CBR1000RR	5	Mechanical	22	
Ret	39	(France) Randy Pagaud	BMW S1000RR	4	Retirement	28	
Ret	20	(France) Sylvain Barrier	BMW S1000RR	3	Accident	5	
Ret	4	(United States) Taylor Knapp	Kawasaki ZX-10R	3	Retirement	25	
OFFICIAL SUPERSTOCK 1000 RACE REPORT

=== Superstock 600 race classification ===
Pos.	No.	Rider	Bike	Laps	Time/Retired	Grid	Points
1	4	(United States) Joshua Day	Kawasaki ZX-6R	9	20:14.260	14	25
2	3	(Australia) Jed Metcher	Yamaha YZF-R6	9	+0.187	5	20
3	84	(Italy) Riccardo Russo	Yamaha YZF-R6	9	+0.245	8	16
4	98	(France) Romain Lanusse	Yamaha YZF-R6	9	+0.425	7	13
5	29	(Italy) Daniele Beretta	Yamaha YZF-R6	9	+0.816	11	11
6	43	(France) Stéphane Egea	Yamaha YZF-R6	9	+5.074	4	10
7	59	(Denmark) Alex Schacht	Honda CBR600RR	9	+6.703	14	9
8	99	(Netherlands) Tony Coveña	Yamaha YZF-R6	9	+7.124	18	8
9	8	(United Kingdom) Joshua Elliott	Yamaha YZF-R6	9	+7.949	3	7
10	10	(Spain) Nacho Calero	Yamaha YZF-R6	9	+8.217	2	6
11	69	(France) Nelson Major	Yamaha YZF-R6	9	+15.502	15	5
12	75	(Italy) Francesco Cocco	Yamaha YZF-R6	9	+19.670	13	4
13	13	(Italy) Dino Lombardi	Yamaha YZF-R6	9	+20.556 (Note: 20-second penalty for jump start.)	10	3
14	5	(United Kingdom) Josh Wainwright	Suzuki GSX-R600	9	+21.702	20	2
15	92	(Australia) Adrian Nestorovic	Yamaha YZF-R6	9	+22.617	17	1
16	56	(United States) Austin Dehaven	Yamaha YZF-R6	9	+28.120	21	
17	23	(Luxembourg) Christophe Ponsson	Yamaha YZF-R6	9	+45.467	22	
Ret	19	(Slovakia) Tomáš Krajči	Yamaha YZF-R6	8	Accident	16	
Ret	18	(Italy) Christian Gamarino	Kawasaki ZX-6R	7	Accident	9	
Ret	60	(Netherlands) Michael Van Der Mark	Honda CBR600RR	6	Retirement	1	
Ret	78	(Netherlands) Tristan Lentink	Honda CBR600RR	4	Retirement	19	
Ret	52	(Belgium) Gauthier Duwelz	Yamaha YZF-R6	3	Accident	6	
Ret	71	(United Kingdom) Max Wadsworth	Yamaha YZF-R6	3	Retirement	23	
OFFICIAL SUPERSTOCK 600 RACE REPORT
