= Gino Rea =

British motorcycle racer (born 1989)

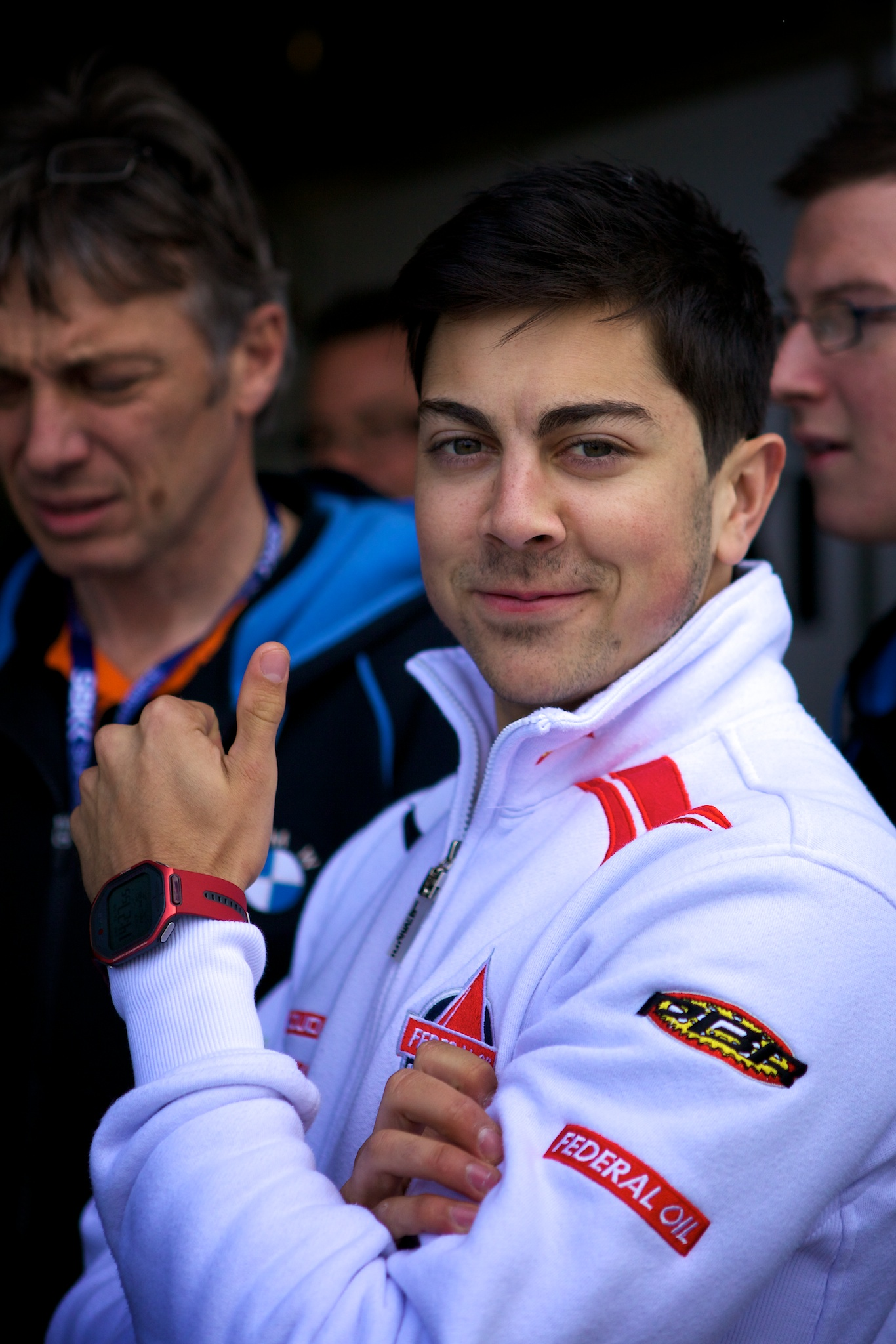
- Rea in 2012
- Born: 18 September 1989 (age 37); Tooting, London, England
Motorcycle racing career statistics
Moto2 World Championship
Active years	2012–2014
Manufacturers	Moriwaki, Suter, FTR, Speed Up
Championships	0
2014 championship position	27th (7 pts)
Starts / Wins / Podiums / Poles / F. laps / Points; 46 / 0 / 1 / 0 / 0 / 36
Supersport World Championship
Active years	2010–2011, 2015–2017
Manufacturers	Honda, MV Agusta, Kawasaki
Championships	0
2017 championship position	17th (31 pts)
Starts / Wins / Podiums / Poles / F. laps / Points; 59 / 1 / 7 / 0 / 1 / 361

Gino Daniel Rea (born 18 September 1989) is an English motorcycle racer & 2022 Endurance World Champion who returned to racing in the Superstock class at the Le Mans 24-hour race in April 2024, his first competitive event after suffering serious injuries in a practice crash at the Suzuka 8 Hours in August 2022.

After emergency hospital treatment including an induced coma, after a month he was transferred by a specialised medical aircraft from Japan to London.

After partial recovery, Rea has been invited to ride a machine in a parade lap at the Le Mans 24-hour round of EWC in April 2023.

Rea's team mates, together with substitute rider, clinched the 2022 Endurance World Championship title at the Bol d'Or race in September 2022.

In 2020, Rea competed in the FIM Endurance World Championship with Wojcik Racing Yamaha, finishing fourth in the World Championship Standings and joined the British Superbike Championship aboard a Suzuki GSX-R1000R with the Buildbase Suzuki team to replace an injured rider. Rea participated in Wojcik Racing's first ever Podium in the FIM EWC at the Bol d'Or 24hr, finishing in second position and winning the Dunlop Independent Cup, following that up with another podium at the Estoril 12hr EWC race. Rea joined the Buildbase Suzuki team as a substitute rider at the fourth British Superbike race of the 2020 season. Rea went on to lead his first BSB race at Donington Park, finishing in fourth position across the line.

== Career ==
The 2009 European Superstock 600 Champion has a wealth of accolades and experience, with 23 podiums and four wins from European Superstock 600, World Supersport, Moto2 Grand Prix World Championship, Endurance World Championship and recently competing in the 2020 British Superbike Championship. Rea was born in Tooting, London.

=== European Superstock 600 Championship ===
Rea was a successful Motocross and Supermoto rider before switching to circuit racing in 2007. He began racing in the European Superstock 600 series in 2007, finishing 12th overall with a podium at Valencia. In 2008, he finished third overall, taking a win at Portimão plus four further podiums and two poles. Rea won the Championship in his third year claiming a win and six podiums in total, clinching the title by a single point in the final round at Portimão. He contested 32 races in the class, with 31 finishes including 12 podiums.

=== Supersport World Championship ===
Rea tested Cal Crutchlow's 2009 title-winning Yamaha YZF-R6 in October 2009, before the team opted to withdraw, and ultimately joined the Intermoto team. He started 2010 with a solid run of top-ten finishes. He finished fourth at Brno before taking his first podium at Silverstone. He finished a very close second to Eugene Laverty in the next round at the Nürburgring, but was excluded for a technical irregularity.

Rea stayed in the World Supersport Championship for 2011 and although he suffered many retirements due to mechanical issues and crashes, Rea took his first World Championship Win at Brno in front of ex-World Champion Fabien Foret and 2011 World Champion Chaz Davies. Rea landed on the podium at his home race in Donington Park and went into the final race of the year in fifth position in the Championship standings. A mechanical failure there ended his season on a low and it meant being bumped down to 11th in the final standings.

=== Moto2 World Championship ===
Rea went on to test for the Gresini Moto2 team at Valencia and Jerez, leaving Valencia as the quickest rider earning him the Gresini Moto2 ride for 2012. An up and down year meant Rea could not progress the way he wanted to but managed to get on the podium at Sepang, Malaysia. Rea crossed the line in the lead but as the red flag came out, the results were put back two laps, robbing Rea of the win but still a second position. At the final race of the year, he battled for a podium spot with the Moto2 World Champion Marc Marquez but fell at turn 2. Rea rejoined for an 11th position, finishing 21st in the Final Points standings.

For 2013, Rea agreed to ride with the newly formed ESGP team in Moto2 but the team pulled out at the last minute (5 February), leaving him without a ride. But this major setback was not enough to stop Rea. He would stay in the race, even if he had to go it alone. With backing from his father and a loan machine from UK bike manufacturer FTR and support from his loyal fans, the Rea's set about running their own team. Rea set up a Donation & Sponsorship page where the public could help keep him on track. Rea asked his followers to help him race by donating to his race fund but instead of just taking money, he decided to give back to his supporters. Rea created different packages, from signed photos, signed T-shirts to hospitality packages. With contributions from all of his supporters, Rea was able to compete at selected wildcard rounds of the Moto2 Championship during 2013.

Running his own team on a shoe-string budget was certainly challenging. Rea acted as his own crew chief, downloading and analysing the data, making the fuel maps and making tyre choices. Impressing in these selected rounds led to a team partnership with Montaze Broz, forming Gino Rea Montaze Broz Racing Team. They would compete in the remaining European rounds but would miss the three flyaway races in Malaysia, Australia and Japan due to budget constraints. Rea stood in for an injured rider and rode for FGR Racing for those rounds and scored valuable points for the team, the only points they ever received in that year.

On 25 November 2013, the Rea family reached an agreement with Dave Peterson to form Rea Racing World Motors to compete in the 2014 Moto2 World Championship on a full-season basis as a permanent team. With title sponsorship from AGT (American Green Technology), the team will be known as AGT REA Racing. 2014 got off to a difficult start with Rea breaking his left foot at the first pre-season test. Hescored his first point scoring finish at Assen, after making his way into the top-ten, only to run off track and finish in 11th. Rea made good progress throughout the season, showing his potential towards the end of the season when he raced to 14th at Motegi after starting 23rd. Rea was on for a strong finish to the season and looked to score points at Sepang, Malaysia until a crash at turn 2 resulted in his right foot being run over, leaving him with three broken metatarsals.

Rea had two plates and screws inserted and raced the following week at the final race in Valencia. He started from the back of the grid and finished 24th with three broken bones in his foot.

=== Return to World Supersport ===
During the first months of 2015, Rea's Moto2 team withdrew from the Championship leaving him without a ride for the season. Rea joined the CIA Landlord Insurance PTR Honda Team to make a return to the World Supersport Championship. Rea had an operation in Melbourne two days before Round 1 to remove a screw from his previously injured right foot. Having to wear a boot two sizes bigger than normal, he still managed to finish on the podium in third place. He went into the final few races in position to challenge for the top-five in the World Supersport Championship standings but had to battle through injury after a horrendous crash at Magny Cours, France when his front brake locked on, sending him over the handlebars. He finished the 2015 World Supersport Championship in sixth.

In 2016 Rea signed with a newly formed team named GRT Racing, switching bike manufacturer to MV Agusta to remain in World Supersport. Even with limited testing and race DNF's due to engine failures, Rea was able to consistently beat the MV Agusta Factory World Supersport Team, finishing on the Podium three times with a best finish of second at Assen, Netherlands. Rea went into the final two races of the season in fourth position in the World Championship Standings but was forced to sit out of both remaining races after a collision with Japanese rider Hikari Obkubo which resulted in a broken left hand. Rea was ultimately pushed back to seventh in the 2016 series standings.

For 2017, Rea signed with Team Go Eleven Kawasaki to remain again in the World Supersport Championship. A run of technical failures and uncompetitive machinery throughout the season resulted in a career worst Championship standing of 17th with a best finish of sixth at Misano, Italy. It marked the first year of World Supersport racing where Rea did not finish on the podium.

=== British Superbike Championship ===
In 2018, Rea made his debut in the British Superbike Championship with OMG Racing UK Suzuki, with a wildcard entry in the Donington Park round of the World Superbike Championship, where he lined up with Championship regulars Jonathon Rea, Chaz Davies, Tom Sykes and Marco Melandri.

Rea made decent progress throughout the 2018 BSB season, finishing the year with a seventh-place finish at the Brands Hatch finale behind Championship winner Leon Haslam.

For 2020, Rea agreed to race in BSB for the Bike Devil Ducati racing team on the Ducati Panigale V4R that took Scott Redding to victory in 2019. Due to the COVID-19 pandemic and financial issues, the Ducati didn't arrive so the team made a last minute switch to a Kawasaki ZX-10RR.

After the first race weekend of the 2020 BSB season, Rea parted ways with the Bike Devil Racing team.

Rea joined the Buildbase Suzuki team as a substitute rider at the fourth BSB race of the 2020 season and quickly showed his ability to adapt to a new bike and surroundings by topping the Free Practice session at Silverstone, lapping under the circuit record in only his second weekend on the bike. Rea went on to lead his first BSB race at Donington Park, finishing in fourth position across the line, just tenths from recording his first BSB podium.

Rea then signed for the Buildbase Suzuki Team to compete in the 2021 Bennetts British Superbike Championship, where he not only scored his first BSB podium but became a double Race Winner at Donington Park, dominating both races.

=== FIM Endurance World Championship ===
On 2 March 2019, Rea joined Polish Team Wójcik Racing Team as a rider in FIM Endurance World Championship in Formula EWC class. At the Bol d'Or 24hr Race, Rea led the race for two hours, taking the team to their first podium in the series and recording the first podium in history for a Polish team, finishing in second position and first Dunlop Independent Team as well as first privateer team.

Rea went on to guide the Wójcik Racing Team to another podium, this time at the Estoril 12-hour EWC round, finishing the 2019-2020 FIM EWC Championship in foourth and winning the Dunlop Independent Cup.

Rea went on to race for the F.C.C TSR Honda Racing team in the Endurance World Championship where he became Endurance World Champion with them. However, towards the end of the season, Rea had a serious accident at the Suzuka Circuit in Japan. After emergency hospital treatment including an induced coma, after a month he was transferred by a specialised medical aircraft from Japan to London. Gino suffered with brain damage, two broken neck bones, a broken collarbone and a rib. Gino went on to recover in rehabilitation hospital and after two years he returned to racing in the Endurance World Superstock class at the Le Mans 24-hour race in April 2024, his first competitive event after suffering the serious injuries.

== Career statistics ==
=== European Superstock 600 Championship ===
==== Races by year ====
(key) (Races in bold indicate pole position; races in italics indicate fastest lap)

Year	Bike	1	2	3	4	5	6	7	8	9	10	11	12	Pos	Pts
2007	Suzuki	EUR; 10	SPA; 3	NED; 23	ITA; 14	GBR; C	SMR; 15	CZE; 11	GBR; 11	GBR; 13	GER; Ret	ITA; 24	FRA; 13	12th	41
2008	Yamaha	SPA; 9	NED; 9	ITA; 8	GER; 3	SMR; 9	CZE; 3	GBR; 2	EUR; 3	**FRA**; 6	**POR**; 1			**3rd**	**132**
2009	Honda	SPA; 3	NED; 1	ITA; 7	SMR; 8	GBR; 2	CZE; 6	GER; 6	ITA; 2	FRA; 2	POR; 3			**1st**	**154**

=== Supersport World Championship ===
==== Races by year ====
(key) (Races in bold indicate pole position; races in italics indicate fastest lap)

Year	Bike	1	2	3	4	5	6	7	8	9	10	11	12	13	Pos	Pts
2010	Honda	AUS; 10	POR; 8	SPA; 6	NED; 7	ITA; 9	RSA; 9	USA; 9	SMR; Ret	CZE; 4	GBR; 3	GER; DSQ	ITA; Ret	FRA; Ret	9th	83
2011	Honda	AUS; Ret	EUR; 3	NED; 16	ITA; Ret	SMR; 10	SPA; 6	CZE; 1	GBR; 11	GER; Ret	ITA; 11	FRA; 22	POR; 14		11th	69
2015	Honda	AUS; 3	THA; 10	SPA; 4	NED; 14	ITA; 7	GBR; 8	POR; 4	ITA; 4	MAL; 8	SPA; Ret	FRA; 7	QAT; Ret		6th	97
2016	MV Agusta	AUS; 7	THA; 9	SPA; Ret	NED; 2	ITA; Ret	MAL; 3	GBR; 4	ITA; 3	GER; Ret	FRA; Ret	SPA; WD	QAT		7th	81
2017	Kawasaki	AUS; Ret	THA; DSQ	SPA; Ret	NED; 17	ITA; 15	GBR; 12	ITA; 6	GER; Ret	POR; 14	FRA; Ret	SPA; 9	QAT; 9		17th	31

=== Grand Prix motorcycle racing ===
==== By season ====
Season	Class	Motorcycle	Team	Race	Win	Podium	Pole	FLap	Pts	Plcd
2012	Moto2	Moriwaki	Federal Oil Gresini Moto2	17	0	1	0	0	25	20th
2012	Moto2	Suter	Federal Oil Gresini Moto2	17	0	1	0	0	25	20th
2013	Moto2	FTR	Gino Rea Race Team; Gino Rea Montáže Brož Racing	11	0	0	0	0	4	26th
2013	Moto2	Speed Up	Argiñano & Ginés Racing	11	0	0	0	0	4	26th
2014	Moto2	Suter	AGT REA Racing	18	0	0	0	0	7	27th
Total				**46**	**0**	**1**	**0**	**0**	**36**	

==== By class ====
Class	Seasons	1st GP	1st Pod	1st Win	Race	Win	Podiums	Pole	FLap	Pts	WChmp
Moto2	2012–2014	2012 Qatar	2012 Malaysia		46	0	1	0	0	36	0
Total	2012–2014				**46**	**0**	**1**	**0**	**0**	**36**	**0**

==== Races by year ====
(key) (Races in bold indicate pole position; races in italics indicate fastest lap)

Year	Class	Bike	1	2	3	4	5	6	7	8	9	10	11	12	13	14	15	16	17	18	Pos	Pts
2012	Moto2	Moriwaki	QAT; 26	SPA; 15	POR; 28																20th	25
2012	Moto2	Suter				FRA; Ret	CAT; Ret	GBR; 24	NED; 21	GER; 17	ITA; 19	INP; 19	CZE; 23	RSM; Ret	ARA; 21	JPN; 24	MAL; 2	AUS; 20	VAL; 12		20th	25
2013	Moto2	FTR	QAT	AME	SPA	FRA; NC	ITA	CAT	NED; 24	GER; 23	INP	CZE; Ret	GBR; Ret	RSM; 21	ARA; 17				VAL; 19		26th	4
2013	Moto2	Speed Up														MAL; 17	AUS; 14	JPN; 14			26th	4
2014	Moto2	Suter	QAT; Ret	AME; 25	ARG; 30	SPA; 26	FRA; 19	ITA; 21	CAT; 22	NED; 11	GER; 25	INP; 25	CZE; 26	GBR; 20	RSM; 22	ARA; 17	JPN; 14	AUS; 21	MAL; Ret	VAL; 24	27th	7

=== British Superbike Championship ===
(key) (Races in bold indicate pole position; races in italics indicate fastest lap)

Year	Make	1		2		3			4		5		6			7		8			9			10		11		12			Pos	Pts
Year	Make	R1	R2	R1	R2	R1	R2	R3	R1	R2	R1	R2	R1	R2	R3	R1	R2	R1	R2	R3	R1	R2	R3	R1	R2	R1	R2	R1	R2	R3	Pos	Pts
2018	Suzuki	DON; 17	DON; 15	BHI; 19	BHI; 17	OUL; 13	OUL; Ret		SNE; 14	SNE; 11	KNO; 17	KNO; 15	BHGP; 16	BHGP; 17		THR; Ret	THR; 17	CAD; 16	CAD; Ret		SIL; 9	SIL; 7	SIL; 14	OUL; 14	OUL; 14	ASS; Ret	ASS; 16	BHGP; 13	BHGP; Ret	BHGP; 7	19th	45

Year	Bike	1		2		3			4		5		6		7		8		9			10		11		12			Pos	Pts
Year	Bike	R1	R2	R1	R2	R1	R2	R3	R1	R2	R1	R2	R1	R2	R1	R2	R1	R2	R1	R2	R3	R1	R2	R1	R2	R1	R2	R3	Pos	Pts
2019	MV Agusta	SIL	SIL	OUL	OUL	DON	DON	DON	BRH	BRH	KNO	KNO	SNE	SNE	THR; 12	THR; Ret	CAD	CAD	OUL	OUL	OUL	ASS	ASS	DON; 20	DON; 26	BHGP; DNS	BHGP; Ret	BHGP; 19	30th	4

Year	Bike	1			2			3			4			5			6			7			8			9			10			11			Pos	Pts
Year	Bike	R1	R2	R3	R1	R2	R3	R1	R2	R3	R1	R2	R3	R1	R2	R3	R1	R2	R3	R1	R2	R3	R1	R2	R3	R1	R2	R3	R1	R2	R3	R1	R2	R3	Pos	Pts
2020	Kawasaki/Suzuki	DON; Ret	DON; 19	DON; 12	SNE; 11	SNE; 12	SNE; 13	SIL; Ret	SIL; 12	SIL; 14	OUL; 10	OUL; 12	OUL; 12	DON; 6	DON; 4	DON; 5	BHGP; 10	BHGP; 9	BHGP; 10																12th	89
2021	Suzuki	OUL; 10	OUL; 13	OUL; 11	KNO; 13	KNO; 10	KNO; 11	BHGP; Ret	BHGP; 10	BHGP; DNS	THR; 8	THR; 10	THR; 11	DON; 15	DON; Ret	DON; 10	CAD; Ret	CAD; Ret	CAD; 11	SNE; Ret	SNE; 5	SNE; 4	SIL; 6	**SIL**; 6	SIL; Ret	OUL; Ret	OUL; 10	OUL; 9	**DON**; 1	**DON**; 4	DON; 1	BHGP; 12	BHGP; 8	BHGP; 10	11th	202

=== FIM World Endurance Championship ===
==== By team ====
Year	Team	Bike	Rider	TC
2022	(Japan) F.C.C. TSR Honda France	Honda CBR1000RR	(Australia) Joshua Hook (France) Mike Di Meglio (United Kingdom) Gino Rea (France) Alan Techer	1st
