= 2012 Miller Superbike World Championship round =

(United States) 2012 Miller Superbike World Championship round
Round details
- Round 6 of 14 rounds in the 2012 Superbike World Championship.
- Date: May 28, 2012
- Location: Miller Motorsports Park
- Course: Permanent racing facility 4.907 km (3.049 mi)

Superbike World Championship
Pole position
(Czech Republic) Jakub Smrž
1:47.626
Fastest lap race 1	Fastest lap race 2
(Italy) Marco Melandri	(Spain) Carlos Checa
1:48.867	1:48.820

The 2012 Miller Superbike World Championship round was the sixth round of the 2012 Superbike World Championship season. It took place on the weekend of May 26–28, 2012 at Miller Motorsports Park, in Tooele, Utah, United States. The races were held on Memorial Day Monday.

Carlos Checa won the first race but lost the front and crashed in the second race while Marco Melandri finished second to Checa in the first race but won the second race. Still, it was Aprilia rider Max Biaggi that extended his lead in the championship standings by finishing third place in both races.

== Superbike ==
=== Race 1 classification ===
Pos	No.	Rider	Bike	Laps	Time	Grid	Points
1	7	(Spain) Carlos Checa	Ducati 1098R	21	38:21.283	2	25
2	33	(Italy) Marco Melandri	BMW S1000RR	21	+2.313	9	20
3	3	(Italy) Max Biaggi	Aprilia RSV4 Factory	21	+5.338	7	16
4	65	(United Kingdom) Jonathan Rea	Honda CBR1000RR	21	+5.517	5	13
5	58	(Republic of Ireland) Eugene Laverty	Aprilia RSV4 Factory	21	+12.201	8	11
6	96	(Czech Republic) Jakub Smrž	Ducati 1098R	21	+13.262	1	10
7	19	(United Kingdom) Chaz Davies	Aprilia RSV4 Factory	21	+19.662	11	9
8	66	(United Kingdom) Tom Sykes	Kawasaki ZX-10R	21	+21.292	3	8
9	84	(Italy) Michel Fabrizio	BMW S1000RR	21	+21.450	10	7
10	91	(United Kingdom) Leon Haslam	BMW S1000RR	21	+23.433	13	6
11	34	(Italy) Davide Giugliano	Ducati 1098R	21	+23.696	4	5
12	50	(France) Sylvain Guintoli	Ducati 1098R	21	+24.752	6	4
13	2	(United Kingdom) Leon Camier	Suzuki GSX-R 1000	21	+29.400	20	3
14	86	(Italy) Ayrton Badovini	BMW S1000RR	21	+31.222	18	2
15	76	(France) Loris Baz	Kawasaki ZX-10R	21	+32.966	17	1
16	121	(France) Maxime Berger	Ducati 1098R	21	+35.409	14	
17	4	(Japan) Hiroshi Aoyama	Honda CBR1000RR	21	+52.153	21	
18	14	(United States) Shane Turpin	Ducati 1098R	20	+1 lap	24	
19	16	(United States) Jake Holden	BMW S1000RR	20	+1 lap	23	
Ret	36	(Argentina) Leandro Mercado	Kawasaki ZX-10R	13	Accident	22	
Ret	87	(Italy) Lorenzo Zanetti	Ducati 1098R	11	Accident	12	
Ret	21	(United States) John Hopkins	Suzuki GSX-R 1000	7	Accident	16	
Ret	44	(Spain) David Salom	Kawasaki ZX-10R	7	Retirement	19	
Ret	59	(Italy) Niccolò Canepa	Ducati 1098R	6	Accident	15	
OFFICIAL SUPERBIKE RACE 1 REPORT

=== Race 2 classification ===
The race was stopped after three laps due to Hiroshi Aoyama's crash, which spilt fluid on the track, and restarted an hour later on an 18-lap distance.

Pos	No.	Rider	Bike	Laps	Time	Grid	Points
1	33	(Italy) Marco Melandri	BMW S1000RR	18	32:56.257	9	25
2	65	(United Kingdom) Jonathan Rea	Honda CBR1000RR	18	+0.195	5	20
3	3	(Italy) Max Biaggi	Aprilia RSV4 Factory	18	+2.137	7	16
4	19	(United Kingdom) Chaz Davies	Aprilia RSV4 Factory	18	+4.245	11	13
5	66	(United Kingdom) Tom Sykes	Kawasaki ZX-10R	18	+9.534	3	11
6	58	(Republic of Ireland) Eugene Laverty	Aprilia RSV4 Factory	18	+9.798	8	10
7	34	(Italy) Davide Giugliano	Ducati 1098R	18	+11.891	4	9
8	91	(United Kingdom) Leon Haslam	BMW S1000RR	18	+12.715	13	8
9	96	(Czech Republic) Jakub Smrž	Ducati 1098R	18	+13.017	1	7
10	50	(France) Sylvain Guintoli	Ducati 1098R	18	+13.703	6	6
11	2	(United Kingdom) Leon Camier	Suzuki GSX-R 1000	18	+15.687	20	5
12	84	(Italy) Michel Fabrizio	BMW S1000RR	18	+21.923	10	4
13	86	(Italy) Ayrton Badovini	BMW S1000RR	18	+23.940	18	3
14	76	(France) Loris Baz	Kawasaki ZX-10R	18	+24.051	17	2
15	121	(France) Maxime Berger	Ducati 1098R	18	+33.897	14	1
16	21	(United States) John Hopkins	Suzuki GSX-R 1000	18	+38.692	16	
17	36	(Argentina) Leandro Mercado	Kawasaki ZX-10R	18	+47.703	22	
18	16	(United States) Jake Holden	BMW S1000RR	18	+1:07.223	23	
19	14	(United States) Shane Turpin	Ducati 1098R	18	+1:41.714	24	
Ret	44	(Spain) David Salom	Kawasaki ZX-10R	13	Retirement	19	
Ret	7	(Spain) Carlos Checa	Ducati 1098R	11	Retirement	2	
Ret	59	(Italy) Niccolò Canepa	Ducati 1098R	9	Retirement	15	
Ret	87	(Italy) Lorenzo Zanetti	Ducati 1098R	5	Accident	12	
Ret	4	(Japan) Hiroshi Aoyama	Honda CBR1000RR		Not restarted	21	
OFFICIAL SUPERBIKE RACE 2 REPORT
