= David Salom =

Spanish motorcycle racer

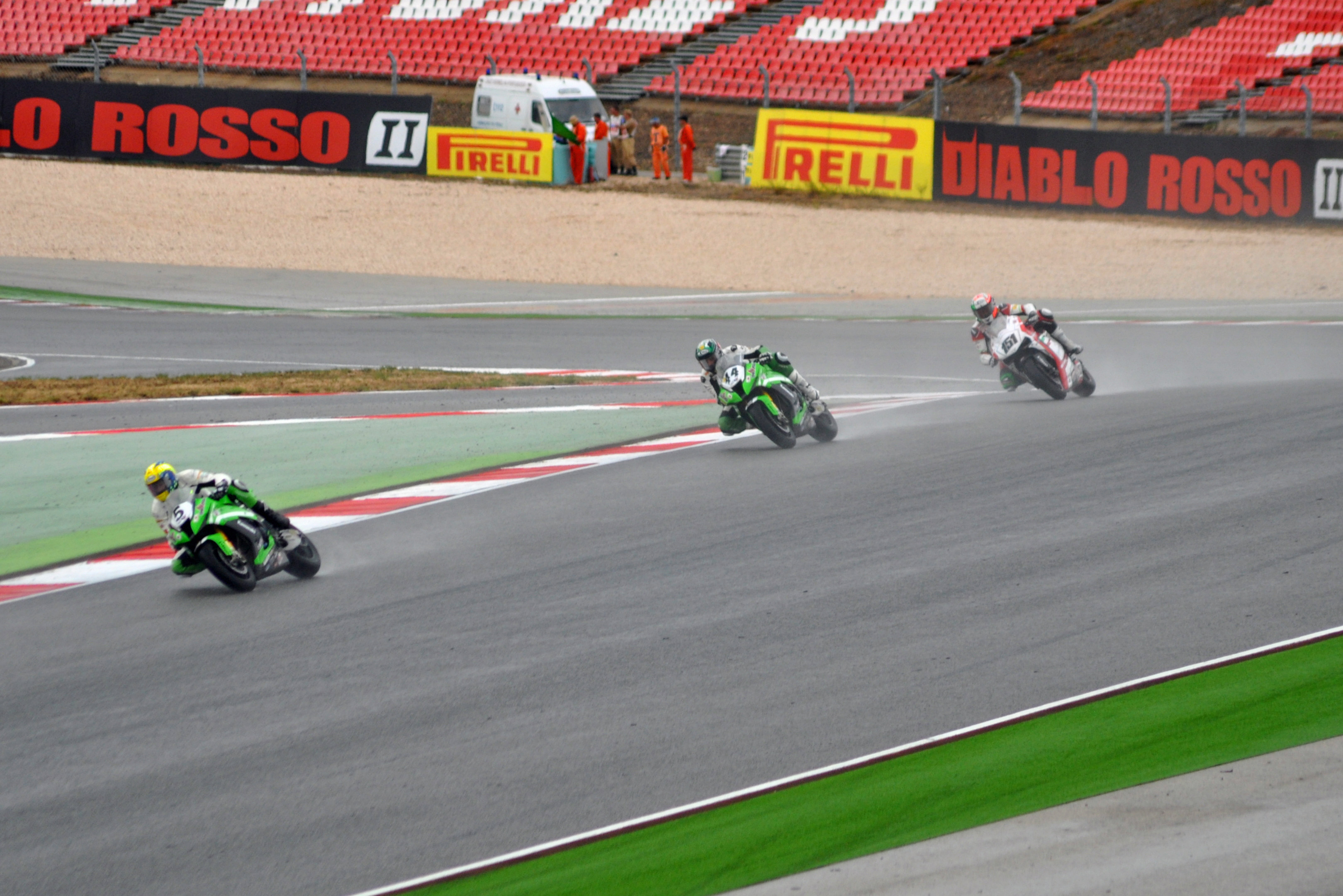
- Salom in 2012
- Nationality: Spanish
- Born: 16 October 1984 (age 42); Palma, Spain
- Website: davidsalom.com
Motorcycle racing career statistics
MotoGP World Championship
Active years	2012
Manufacturers	BQR
2012 championship position	27th (1 pt)
Starts / Wins / Podiums / Poles / F. laps / Points; 2 / 0 / 0 / 0 / 0 / 1
Superbike World Championship
Active years	2009, 2012–2014
Manufacturers	Kawasaki
2014 championship position	12th (103 pts)
Starts / Wins / Podiums / Poles / F. laps / Points; 74 / 0 / 0 / 0 / 0 / 152
Supersport World Championship
Active years	2007–2008, 2010–2011, 2013
Manufacturers	Yamaha, Triumph, Kawasaki
2013 championship position	18th (30 pts)
Starts / Wins / Podiums / Poles / F. laps / Points; 56 / 0 / 3 / 3 / 0 / 328

David Salom Fuentes (born 16 October 1984) is a Spanish professional motorcycle racer. He won the 2006 Spanish Supersport Championship, the 2014 Superbike EVO Trophy and the 2017 24 Hours of Catalunya. Salom is also the cousin of late Luis Salom.

== Motorcycle racing career ==
Salom was born in Palma de Mallorca, Spain. In 2011, he reached second place at Silverstone, third at Aragon and achieved three pole positions at Phillip Island, Silverstone and Estoril. In 2012, Salom was replaced by Iván Silva in the Avintia Blusens team from Motegi after disappointing results. For 2013, Salom has signed to the Czech-based Intermoto Ponyexpres team.

== Career statistics ==
=== Supersport World Championship ===
==== Races by year ====
Year	Bike	1	2	3	4	5	6	7	8	9	10	11	12	13	Pos.	Pts
2007	Yamaha	QAT; 14	AUS; 15	EUR; 13	SPA; 6	NED; 5	ITA; 9	GBR; 17	SMR; Ret	CZE; 21	GBR; 24	GER; 20	ITA; Ret	FRA; Ret	21st	34
2008	Yamaha	QAT; 8	AUS; 18	SPA; 16	NED; 16	ITA; 16	GER	SMR; Ret	CZE; 15	GBR; 21	EUR; Ret	ITA; 19	FRA; 17	POR; 16	29th	9
2010	Triumph	AUS; 4	POR; 10	SPA; 4	NED; Ret	ITA; 8	RSA; 7	USA; 7	SMR; 10	CZE; 8	GBR; 8	GER; 6	ITA; Ret	FRA; 7	6th	99
2011	Kawasaki	**AUS**; 4	EUR; 6	NED; 5	ITA; 8	SMR; 4	SPA; 3	CZE; 4	**GBR**; 2	GER; 8	ITA; 5	FRA; 4	**POR**; 2		**2nd**	**156**
2013	Kawasaki	AUS; 5	SPA	NED	ITA	GBR	POR; NC	ITA	RUS	GBR; 15	GER; 9	TUR; 8	FRA	SPA; 13	18th	30

=== Superbike World Championship ===
==== Races by year ====
Year	Make	1		2		3		4		5		6		7		8		9		10		11		12		13		14		Pos.	Pts
Year	Make	R1	R2	R1	R2	R1	R2	R1	R2	R1	R2	R1	R2	R1	R2	R1	R2	R1	R2	R1	R2	R1	R2	R1	R2	R1	R2	R1	R2	Pos.	Pts
2009	Kawasaki	AUS; 21	AUS; 25	QAT; 18	QAT; Ret	SPA; 19	SPA; 21	NED; 20	NED; Ret	ITA; 19	ITA; 21	RSA; 20	RSA; 16	USA; 20	USA; 18	SMR; 23	SMR; Ret	GBR; 23	GBR; 19	CZE; 17	CZE; Ret	GER; 17	GER; 17	ITA; 18	ITA; Ret	FRA; 14	FRA; 16	POR; 13	POR; 17	36th	5
2012	Kawasaki	AUS; 14	AUS; Ret	ITA; 19	ITA; 17	NED; 13	NED; 12	ITA; C	ITA; DNS	EUR	EUR	USA; Ret	USA; Ret	SMR; Ret	SMR; Ret	SPA; Ret	SPA; 16	CZE; 18	CZE; Ret	GBR; 15	GBR; Ret	RUS; 10	RUS; 13	GER; DNS	GER; DNS	POR; Ret	POR; 13	FRA	FRA	21st	22
2013	Kawasaki	AUS	AUS	SPA	SPA	NED	NED	ITA	ITA	GBR	GBR	POR	POR	ITA	ITA	RUS	RUS	GBR	GBR	GER	GER	TUR	TUR	USA; 11	USA; 9	FRA; 11	FRA; 11	SPA	SPA	21st	22
2014	Kawasaki	AUS; 9	AUS; 10	SPA; 13	SPA; 10	NED; 12	NED; 15	ITA; 12	ITA; 13	GBR; 10	GBR; 10	MAL; 9	MAL; 13	SMR; 11	SMR; 10	POR; 9	POR; 17	USA; 10	USA; 8	SPA; 9	SPA; Ret	FRA; DNS	FRA; DNS	QAT; 13	QAT; 11					12th	103
2015	Kawasaki	AUS; DNS	AUS; DNS	THA; 8	THA; 9	SPA; Ret	SPA; 6	NED; 14	NED; 13	ITA; DNS	ITA; DNS	GBR; 10	GBR; 12	POR; 14	POR; Ret	SMR; 17	SMR; 15	USA; Ret	USA; Ret	MAL; 11	MAL; 7	SPA; 11	SPA; 12	FRA; Ret	FRA; 14	QAT; 8	QAT; 9			14th	83

=== Grand Prix motorcycle racing ===
==== By season ====
Season	Class	Motorcycle	Team	Number	Race	Win	Podium	Pole	FLap	Pts	Plcd
2012	MotoGP	BQR	Avintia Blusens	44	2	0	0	0	0	1	27th
Total					**2**	**0**	**0**	**0**	**0**	**1**	

==== Races by year ====
(key) (Races in bold indicate pole position, races in italics indicate fastest lap)

Year	Class	Bike	1	2	3	4	5	6	7	8	9	10	11	12	13	14	15	16	17	18	Pos	Pts
2012	MotoGP	BQR	QAT	SPA	POR	FRA	CAT	GBR	NED	GER	ITA	USA	INP	CZE	RSM; 15	ARA; Ret	JPN	MAL	AUS	VAL	27th	1
