= Eugene Laverty =

Irish motorcycle racer (born 1986)

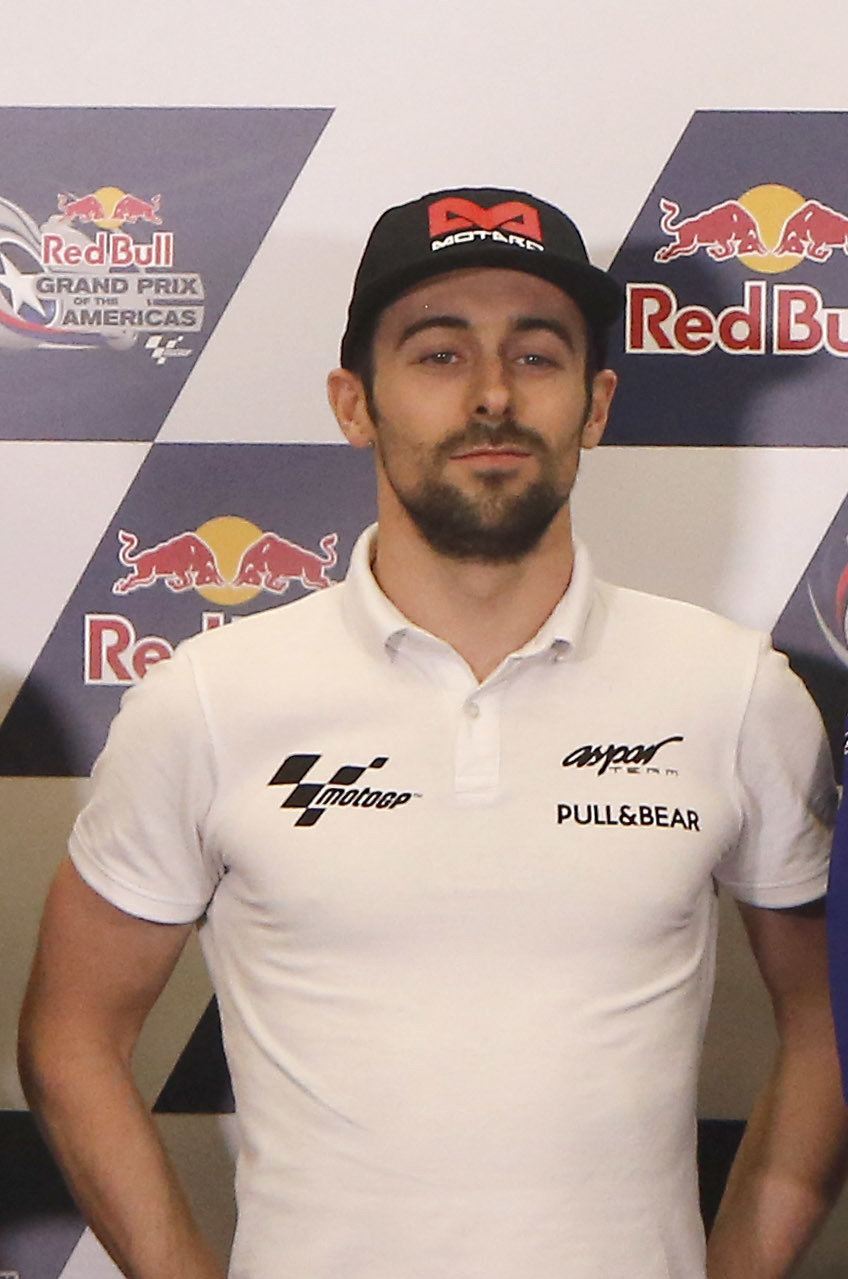
- Laverty in 2016
- Nationality: Irish
- Born: 3 June 1986 (age 40); Toome / Toomebridge, County Antrim, Northern Ireland
- Current team: Bonovo Action BMW
- Bike number: 50
- Website: elaverty.com
Motorcycle racing career statistics
MotoGP World Championship
| Active years | 2015–2016 |
| Manufacturers | Honda, Ducati |
| Championships | 0 |
| 2016 championship position | 13th (77 pts) |
Starts / Wins / Podiums / Poles / F. laps / Points; 36 / 0 / 0 / 0 / 0 / 86
250cc World Championship
| Active years | 2007–2008 |
| Manufacturers | Honda, Aprilia |
| Championships | 0 |
| 2008 championship position | 21st (8 pts) |
Starts / Wins / Podiums / Poles / F. laps / Points; 29 / 0 / 0 / 0 / 0 / 14
125cc World Championship
| Active years | 2004 |
| Manufacturers | Honda |
| Championships | 0 |
| 2004 championship position | NC (0 pts) |
Starts / Wins / Podiums / Poles / F. laps / Points; 1 / 0 / 0 / 0 / 0 / 0
Superbike World Championship
| Active years | 2011–2014, 2017–2022 |
| Manufacturers | Yamaha, Aprilia, Suzuki, Ducati, BMW |
| Championships | 0 |
| 2022 championship position | 16th (36 pts) |
Starts / Wins / Podiums / Poles / F. laps / Points; 242 / 13 / 35 / 4 / 5 / 1678.5
Supersport World Championship
| Active years | 2008–2010 |
| Manufacturers | Yamaha, Honda |
| Championships | 0 |
| 2010 championship position | 2nd (252 pts) |
Starts / Wins / Podiums / Poles / F. laps / Points; 29 / 12 / 19 / 6 / 6 / 508

Eugene Laverty (born 3 June 1986) is a former professional motorcycle road racer from Northern Ireland, the brother of Michael and John.

For 2022, Laverty is contracted to ride for satellite BMW team Bonovo in World Superbike Championship. Midway through the season, Laverty announced his intended retirement at the end of 2022, partly due to poor race results, to continue with the same team as a co-owner and rider coach.

During 2021, Laverty rode in some World Superbike events before his RC Squadra Corse team withdrew from racing; further rides later in the season were as a replacement for injured BMW factory rider Tom Sykes.

In 2011 and 2013 he was awarded the Joey Dunlop Memorial Trophy for the Best Irish Motorcyclist of the Year and in 2024 he was inducted in the Irish Motorcycling Hall of Fame.

== Career ==
=== Early career ===
Born in Toomebridge, Northern Ireland, Laverty was runner-up in the 2004 British 125cc Championship. He had a successful year in 2006 aboard the Dunlop shod Red Bull Honda CBR600RR. He was a top challenger for the British Supersport title, but finished third overall behind Cal Crutchlow and Tom Sykes, with four wins. He had previously finished ninth overall as a series rookie in 2005.

=== 250cc World Championship (2007–2008) ===
For 2007, Laverty raced in the 250cc Grand Prix World Championship for LCR Honda finishing in 25th place overall with a best result of 14th. A strong run at Barcelona produced no points due to an engine problem.

For 2008, it was expected that Laverty would go back to Britain and further his career in Supersports or Superbikes, but he was signed by Blusens Aprilia on 18 December to continue to race in 250cc with privateer motorcycles. He scored points in China and Portugal, but at Le Mans he crashed at the one remaining wet corner as the circuit dried.

=== Supersport World Championship (2008–2010) ===
Plans for Laverty to make his World Superbike debut later that year were scrapped when Chris Walker joined the team full-time, but he instead joined the factory Yamaha team in World Supersport as a temporary replacement for the injured Fabien Foret. Despite riding injured following a crash at the 2008 Indianapolis motorcycle Grand Prix a week earlier, he moved up from an early seventh to battle championship leader Andrew Pitt and teammate Broc Parkes for second. Parkes got the better of him, but he finished on the podium after surviving contact with Pitt which eliminated the Honda rider. He decided before this race to end his 250cc season, and focus on a full-time WSS ride for 2009.

Laverty signed with the Parkalgar Honda World Supersport team for the 2009 season. On 14 March 2009, Laverty won his first Supersport World Championship race at the Losail International Circuit in Qatar, narrowly beating Ten Kate Racing's Andrew Pitt to the chequered flag. His win was also the first for the Parkalgar Honda team. He stacked up three more wins and four-second places to finish as series runner-up behind Yamaha rider Cal Crutchlow – ending Ten Kate's run of being the top Honda team for many years.

=== Superbike World Championship (2011–2014) ===
Laverty, on his Yamaha World Superbike, won his first Superbike World Championship race at Monza on 8 May 2011. Eugene stood proudly as his national anthem was played just after race one. Later that afternoon, Laverty completed the double by winning race two, with fellow Yamaha teammate Marco Melandri taking second spot. For 2012, Laverty rode a factory-specification Aprilia, partnering Max Biaggi.

=== MotoGP World Championship (2015–2016) ===
For the 2015 season, Laverty moved to MotoGP with the Aspar Team, riding a Honda RC213V-RS open-specification motorcycle. He finished the season in 22nd place in the riders' championship standings, with a best result of 12th in Catalunya.

Laverty remained with the team – now riding Ducati Desmosedici GP14.2 motorcycles – for the 2016 season, where he partnered Yonny Hernández. In Argentina, he achieved his best results in MotoGP career with fourth place.

== Timeline ==
In 2008, Laverty had competed in both the 250cc World Championship and the World Supersport series, he then went on to be runner up in the Supersport World Championship in both 2009 and 2010.

In 2011, Laverty moved up to the Superbike World Championship with the factory Yamaha World Superbike team, alongside former MotoGP rider Marco Melandri. On 8 May, he won his first World Superbike race at Monza and went on to complete the double in race two. For 2012, he moved to the Aprilia Racing Team and has been racing the Aprilia RSV4 alongside Max Biaggi, ending the championship in sixth position and competed for the 2013 championship in the same team alongside Sylvain Guintoli.

In 2017 and 2018, Laverty competed in the World Superbikes aboard an Aprilia RSV4, before losing his position within the Shaun Muir Racing team to former Kawasaki rider Tom Sykes.

For 2019, Laverty was contracted to ride in the Superbike World Championship for Team Go Eleven on a Ducati Panigale.

During 2021, Laverty rode a few times for under-financed RC Squadra Corse BMW team and as a replacement for injured Chaz Davies.

For 2022, Laverty signed to race in Superbike World Championship for satellite BMW team Bonovo, together with team-mate Loris Baz.

== Career statistics ==
=== Grand Prix motorcycle racing ===
==== By season ====
| Season | Class | Motorcycle | Team | Race | Win | Podium | Pole | FLap | Pts | Plcd |
|---|---|---|---|---|---|---|---|---|---|---|
| 2004 | 125cc | Honda | Red Bull Rookies Honda | 1 | 0 | 0 | 0 | 0 | 0 | NC |
| 2007 | 250cc | Honda | Honda LCR | 17 | 0 | 0 | 0 | 0 | 6 | 25th |
| 2008 | 250cc | Aprilia | Blusens Aprilia | 12 | 0 | 0 | 0 | 0 | 8 | 21st |
| 2015 | MotoGP | Honda | Aspar MotoGP Team | 18 | 0 | 0 | 0 | 0 | 9 | 22nd |
| 2016 | MotoGP | Ducati | Pull & Bear Aspar Team | 18 | 0 | 0 | 0 | 0 | 77 | 13th |
| Total | | | | **66** | **0** | **0** | **0** | **0** | **100** | |

==== By class ====
| Class | Seasons | 1st GP | 1st Pod | 1st Win | Race | Win | Podiums | Pole | FLap | Pts | WChmp |
|---|---|---|---|---|---|---|---|---|---|---|---|
| 125cc | 2004 | 2004 Great Britain | | | 1 | 0 | 0 | 0 | 0 | 0 | 0 |
| 250cc | 2007–2008 | 2007 Qatar | | | 29 | 0 | 0 | 0 | 0 | 14 | 0 |
| MotoGP | 2015–2016 | 2015 Qatar | | | 36 | 0 | 0 | 0 | 0 | 86 | 0 |
| Total | 2004, 2007–2008, 2015–2016 | | | | **66** | **0** | **0** | **0** | **0** | **100** | |

==== Races by year ====
(key) (Races in bold indicate pole position, races in italics indicate fastest lap)

| Year | Class | Bike | 1 | 2 | 3 | 4 | 5 | 6 | 7 | 8 | 9 | 10 | 11 | 12 | 13 | 14 | 15 | 16 | 17 | 18 | Pos | Pts |
|---|---|---|---|---|---|---|---|---|---|---|---|---|---|---|---|---|---|---|---|---|---|---|
| 2004 | 125cc | Honda | RSA | SPA | FRA | ITA | CAT | NED | RIO | GER | GBR; 25 | CZE | POR | JPN | QAT | MAL | AUS | VAL | | | NC | 0 |
| 2007 | 250cc | Honda | QAT; 18 | SPA; 14 | TUR; 17 | CHN; 17 | FRA; 15 | ITA; 20 | CAT; 19 | GBR; Ret | NED; 21 | GER; Ret | CZE; Ret | RSM; 15 | POR; 14 | JPN; 19 | AUS; 16 | MAL; 17 | VAL; 21 | | 25th | 6 |
| 2008 | 250cc | Aprilia | QAT; Ret | SPA; Ret | POR; 15 | CHN; 13 | FRA; Ret | ITA; 13 | CAT; 16 | GBR; Ret | NED; 16 | GER; 15 | CZE; 16 | RSM; Ret | INP; C | JPN | AUS | MAL | VAL | | 21st | 8 |
| 2015 | MotoGP | Honda | QAT; 18 | AME; 16 | ARG; 17 | SPA; 18 | FRA; 14 | ITA; 15 | CAT; 12 | NED; Ret | GER; 17 | INP; 19 | CZE; Ret | GBR; 17 | RSM; 19 | ARA; 14 | JPN; 17 | AUS; 19 | MAL; 19 | VAL; Ret | 22nd | 9 |
| 2016 | MotoGP | Ducati | QAT; 12 | ARG; 4 | AME; 12 | SPA; 9 | FRA; 11 | ITA; 13 | CAT; 13 | NED; 7 | GER; 11 | AUT; 18 | CZE; 6 | GBR; 12 | RSM; 14 | ARA; 14 | JPN; Ret | AUS; 14 | MAL; 12 | VAL; 16 | 13th | 77 |

=== Supersport World Championship ===
==== By season ====
| Season | Motorcycle | Team | Race | Win | Podium | Pole | FLap | Pts | Plcd |
|---|---|---|---|---|---|---|---|---|---|
| 2008 | Yamaha | Yamaha World Supersport | 2 | 0 | 1 | 0 | 0 | 20 | 21st |
| 2009 | Honda | Parkalgar Honda | 14 | 4 | 8 | 1 | 1 | 236 | **2nd** |
| 2010 | Honda | Parkalgar Honda | 13 | 8 | 10 | 5 | 5 | 252 | **2nd** |
| Total | | | **29** | **12** | **19** | **6** | **6** | **508** | |

==== Races by year ====
(key) (Races in bold indicate pole position; races in italics indicate fastest lap)

| Year | Bike | 1 | 2 | 3 | 4 | 5 | 6 | 7 | 8 | 9 | 10 | 11 | 12 | 13 | 14 | Pos | Pts |
|---|---|---|---|---|---|---|---|---|---|---|---|---|---|---|---|---|---|
| 2008 | Yamaha | QAT | AUS | SPA | NED | ITA | GER | SMR | CZE | GBR | EUR; 12 | ITA; 3 | FRA | POR | | 21st | 20 |
| 2009 | Honda | AUS; 5 | QAT; 1 | SPA; 9 | NED; 1 | ITA; 4 | RSA; 1 | USA; 2 | SMR; 2 | GBR; 5 | CZE; 5 | GER; 2 | ITA; 2 | FRA; 13 | **POR**; 1 | **2nd** | **236** |
| 2010 | Honda | AUS; 1 | **POR**; 11 | **SPA**; 5 | NED; 1 | ITA; 1 | **RSA**; 1 | USA; 2 | SMR; 1 | CZE; Ret | **GBR**; 1 | **GER**; 1 | ITA; 3 | FRA; 1 | | **2nd** | **252** |

=== Superbike World Championship ===
==== By season ====
| Season | Motorcycle | Team | Race | Win | Podium | Pole | FLap | Pts | Plcd |
|---|---|---|---|---|---|---|---|---|---|
| 2011 | Yamaha | Yamaha World Superbike Team | 26 | 2 | 6 | 0 | 0 | 303 | 4th |
| 2012 | Aprilia | Aprilia Racing Team | 27 | 1 | 6 | 0 | 1 | 263.5 | 6th |
| 2013 | Aprilia | Aprilia Racing Team | 27 | 9 | 19 | 2 | 4 | 424 | **2nd** |
| 2014 | Suzuki | Voltcom Crescent Suzuki | 24 | 1 | 2 | 0 | 0 | 161 | 10th |
| 2017 | Aprilia | Milwaukee Aprilia | 26 | 0 | 0 | 0 | 0 | 157 | 10th |
| 2018 | Aprilia | Milwaukee Aprilia | 21 | 0 | 2 | 1 | 0 | 158 | 8th |
| 2019 | Ducati | Team GoEleven | 24 | 0 | 0 | 0 | 0 | 81 | 15th |
| 2020 | BMW | BMW Motorrad WorldSBK Team | 22 | 0 | 0 | 1 | 0 | 55 | 15th |
| 2021 | BMW | RC Squadra Corse | 19 | 0 | 0 | 0 | 0 | 40 | 19th |
| 2022 | BMW | Bonovo Action BMW | 27 | 0 | 0 | 0 | 0 | 36* | 16th* |
| Total | | | **243** | **13** | **35** | **4** | **5** | **1678.5** | |

==== Races by year ====
(key) (Races in bold indicate pole position) (Races in italics indicate fastest lap)

| Year | Bike | 1 | | 2 | | 3 | | 4 | | 5 | | 6 | | 7 | | 8 | | 9 | | 10 | | 11 | | 12 | | 13 | | 14 | | Pos | Pts |
| Year | Bike | R1 | R2 | R1 | R2 | R1 | R2 | R1 | R2 | R1 | R2 | R1 | R2 | R1 | R2 | R1 | R2 | R1 | R2 | R1 | R2 | R1 | R2 | R1 | R2 | R1 | R2 | R1 | R2 | Pos | Pts |
|---|---|---|---|---|---|---|---|---|---|---|---|---|---|---|---|---|---|---|---|---|---|---|---|---|---|---|---|---|---|---|---|
| 2011 | Yamaha | AUS; 4 | AUS; 15 | EUR; Ret | EUR; 14 | NED; 7 | NED; 6 | ITA; 1 | ITA; 1 | USA; 5 | USA; 4 | SMR; 5 | SMR; 13 | SPA; 4 | SPA; 6 | CZE; 5 | CZE; 5 | GBR; 2 | GBR; 2 | GER; 4 | GER; 5 | ITA; 5 | ITA; 4 | FRA; 5 | FRA; 3 | POR; 19 | POR; 2 | | | 4th | 303 |
| 2012 | Aprilia | AUS; Ret | AUS; 8 | ITA; 5 | ITA; 6 | NED; 5 | NED; 3 | ITA; C | ITA; 3 | EUR; 15 | EUR; Ret | USA; 5 | USA; 6 | SMR; 7 | SMR; Ret | SPA; 5 | SPA; 2 | CZE; 5 | CZE; 5 | GBR; 10 | GBR; 4 | RUS; 4 | RUS; Ret | GER; 2 | GER; 2 | POR; 13 | POR; 1 | FRA; 7 | FRA; 4 | 6th | 263.5 |
| 2013 | Aprilia | AUS; 2 | AUS; 1 | SPA; NC | SPA; Ret | NED; 4 | NED; 1 | ITA; 3 | ITA; 1 | GBR; 7 | GBR; 3 | POR; Ret | POR; 1 | ITA; 3 | ITA; Ret | RUS; Ret | RUS; C | **GBR**; 2 | **GBR**; 3 | GER; 15 | GER; 2 | TUR; 1 | TUR; 1 | USA; 3 | USA; 1 | FRA; 3 | FRA; 2 | **SPA**; 1 | **SPA**; 1 | **2nd** | **424** |
| 2014 | Suzuki | AUS; 1 | AUS; Ret | SPA; 5 | SPA; 6 | NED; Ret | NED; Ret | ITA; 7 | ITA; 9 | GBR; Ret | GBR; 13 | MAL; 3 | MAL; 7 | ITA; 9 | ITA; 7 | POR; 8 | POR; 9 | USA; Ret | USA; 4 | SPA; 6 | SPA; 6 | FRA; 19 | FRA; Ret | QAT; 9 | QAT; Ret | | | | | 10th | 161 |
| 2017 | Aprilia | AUS; 8 | AUS; 10 | THA; Ret | THA; 15 | SPA; 8 | SPA; 9 | NED; 8 | NED; 8 | ITA; NC | ITA; 7 | GBR; 13 | GBR; Ret | ITA; 6 | ITA; 5 | USA; Ret | USA; 6 | GER; 10 | GER; Ret | POR; 7 | POR; 4 | FRA; 6 | FRA; 17 | SPA; 8 | SPA; Ret | QAT; 4 | QAT; 7 | | | 10th | 157 |
| 2018 | Aprilia | AUS; 8 | AUS; 15 | THA; 9 | THA; Ret | SPA | SPA | NED | NED | ITA; 12 | ITA; 9 | GBR; 6 | GBR; Ret | CZE; 6 | CZE; 4 | USA; 4 | USA; 3 | ITA; 3 | ITA; 8 | **POR**; Ret | POR; 7 | FRA; 9 | FRA; 11 | ARG; 5 | ARG; Ret | QAT; 4 | QAT; C | | | 8th | 158 |

| Year | Bike | 1 | | | 2 | | | 3 | | | 4 | | | 5 | | | 6 | | | 7 | | | 8 | | | 9 | | | 10 | | | 11 | | | 12 | | | 13 | | | Pos | Pts |
| Year | Bike | R1 | SR | R2 | R1 | SR | R2 | R1 | SR | R2 | R1 | SR | R2 | R1 | SR | R2 | R1 | SR | R2 | R1 | SR | R2 | R1 | SR | R2 | R1 | SR | R2 | R1 | SR | R2 | R1 | SR | R2 | R1 | SR | R2 | R1 | SR | R2 | Pos | Pts |
|---|---|---|---|---|---|---|---|---|---|---|---|---|---|---|---|---|---|---|---|---|---|---|---|---|---|---|---|---|---|---|---|---|---|---|---|---|---|---|---|---|---|---|
| 2019 | Ducati | AUS; 12 | AUS; 9 | AUS; 9 | THA; Ret | THA; DNS | THA; Ret | SPA; 15 | SPA; 6 | SPA; 6 | NED; 14 | NED; C | NED; 13 | ITA; WD | ITA; WD | ITA; WD | SPA | SPA | SPA | ITA | ITA | ITA | GBR; DNS | GBR; DNS | GBR; DNS | USA; 11 | USA; 14 | USA; 12 | POR; Ret | POR; 15 | POR; 14 | FRA; 9 | FRA; 13 | FRA; 12 | ARG; DNS | ARG; 13 | ARG; 7 | QAT; 9 | QAT; 9 | QAT; 6 | 15th | 81 |
| 2020 | BMW | AUS; 11 | AUS; DNS | AUS; DNS | SPA; 15 | SPA; 13 | SPA; Ret | POR; 10 | POR; 20 | POR; 12 | SPA; 16 | SPA; 16 | SPA; 14 | SPA; 8 | SPA; 14 | SPA; 11 | SPA; 11 | SPA; 11 | SPA; 7 | **FRA**; Ret | **FRA**; 15 | FRA; 14 | POR; 12 | POR; 16 | POR; 12 | | | | | | | | | | | | | | | | 15th | 55 |
| 2021 | BMW | SPA; Ret | SPA; 16 | SPA; 17 | POR; 18 | POR; 8 | POR; 9 | ITA; DNS | ITA; 13 | ITA; 15 | GBR; 13 | GBR; 12 | GBR; 15 | NED | NED | NED | CZE | CZE | CZE | SPA | SPA | SPA | FRA | FRA | FRA | SPA | SPA | SPA | SPA; 12 | SPA; C | SPA; 11 | POR; 9 | POR; 9 | POR; 10 | ARG; 13 | ARG; 15 | ARG; 16 | INA | INA | INA | 19th | 40 |
| 2022 | BMW | SPA; 10 | SPA; 11 | SPA; 12 | NED; DNS | NED; DNS | NED; DNS | POR; 15 | POR; Ret | POR; 14 | ITA; 13 | ITA; 12 | ITA; 14 | GBR; 20 | GBR; 23 | GBR; Ret | CZE; 19 | CZE; 18 | CZE; DNS | FRA; 18 | FRA; 18 | FRA; Ret | SPA; 10 | SPA; 14 | SPA; 14 | POR; 15 | POR; 15 | POR; 16 | ARG; 14 | ARG; 19 | ARG; 11 | INA; 14 | INA; 17 | INA; 16 | AUS; 18 | AUS; 15 | AUS; Ret | | | | 16th | 36 |

^{*} Season still in progress.
