= Roberto Rolfo =

Italian motorcycle racer

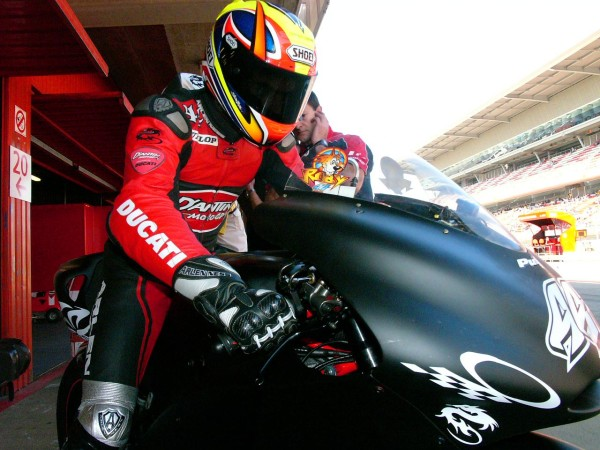
- Rolfo in 2005.
- Nationality: Italian
- Born: 23 March 1980 (age 46); Turin, Italy
- Current team: Grillini Racing Team
- Bike number: 44
- Website: robyrolfo.eu
Motorcycle racing career statistics
MotoGP World Championship
Active years	2005, 2012
Manufacturers	Ducati, ART
Championships	0
2012 championship position	NC (0 pts)
Starts / Wins / Podiums / Poles / F. laps / Points; 21 / 0 / 0 / 0 / 0 / 25
Moto2 World Championship
Active years	2010, 2012, 2014
Manufacturers	Suter
Championships	0
2014 championship position	29th (2 pts)
Starts / Wins / Podiums / Poles / F. laps / Points; 30 / 1 / 2 / 0 / 0 / 78
250cc World Championship
Active years	1996, 1998–2004
Manufacturers	Aprilia, TSR-Honda, Honda
Championships	0
2004 championship position	8th (116 pts)
Starts / Wins / Podiums / Poles / F. laps / Points; 102 / 3 / 18 / 0 / 3 / 896
Superbike World Championship
Active years	2006–2009, 2011, 2017
Manufacturers	Ducati, Honda, Kawasaki
Championships	0
2017 championship position	33rd (4 pts)
Starts / Wins / Podiums / Poles / F. laps / Points; 105 / 0 / 0 / 0 / 0 / 369
Supersport World Championship
Active years	2013–2017
Manufacturers	MV Agusta, Kawasaki, Honda
2017 championship position	12th (43 pts)
Starts / Wins / Podiums / Poles / F. laps / Points; 55 / 1 / 4 / 0 / 0 / 321

Roberto 'Roby' Rolfo (born 23 March 1980) is an Italian former professional motorcycle road racer. He had his best season in 2003, when he finished in second place in the 250cc World Championship. Rolfo competed in the MotoGP class for one year before he switched to the Superbike World Championship, where he remained up to the start of 2009.

== Career ==
Rolfo was born in Turin, Italy.

=== 250cc World Championship ===
Rolfo began competing in the Grand Prix series with a few wildcard entries in 1996. After finishing in third place in the European championship in 1997, Rolfo competed in his first full World Championship season in 1998. In his first season, his best result was fifth place in Argentina, and in 1999 it was again a fifth, at Catalunya. In 2000, he finished no higher than sixth.

2001 proved to be a breakthrough year. Riding for the Safilo Aprilia team, Rolfo finished fourth in the championship, ahead of the factory Aprilias Riccardo Chiarello and Jeremy McWilliams. After scoring points in the first four races, he scored three podiums in the next four (second at Mugello and Donington Park and third at Catalunya). He only failed to score points twice all season.

In 2002, Rolfo raced for the Fortuna-Honda Gresini team. He scored five second places, three of them behind countryman and champion Marco Melandri. He only failed to score points once, earning him third place overall in the world championship.

Following Fausto Gresini's decision to concentrate in MotoGP class in 2003, Rolfo switched to a team run by Daniel Amatrian, albeit main sponsor Fortuna remains. He went better both in terms of race results and championship finish. He was victorious at Sachsenring and Phillip Island en route to finishing the season in second overall. He went into the final race knowing that victory would give him the title unless Manuel Poggiali finished second, but he was down in seventh. He did beat the series' winningest rider that year, Toni Elías, into third overall however.

2004 was not a success by these standards. Rolfo won in Spain, but was not on the podium again, finishing only eighth overall.

=== MotoGP ===
After making no advance in 2004, Rolfo moved up to MotoGP for 2005, with the D'Antin Ducati team. Running year-old machinery, on Dunlop tyres which were perceived to be inferior and which the bike was not designed around, and with no teammate, decent results were always going to be hard to come by. He scored points in nine races, with a best of tenth, to finish 18th overall in the championship.

=== Superbike World Championship ===
With no ride available in MotoGP, Rolfo switched to the Superbike World Championship for 2006. He raced for Caracchi Ducati team on a privateer bike. He started strongly, with a fifth place and two seventh places in the first four races, but only managed two top-ten finishes (both at Monza) in the following five rounds, and ultimately finished 16th overall.

For 2007, Rolfo joined the HANNspree Ten Kate Honda team, alongside 2004 champion James Toseland. Rolfo managed a career-best fourth place at Monza and Silverstone and finished eighth overall, but was overshadowed by his teammate's championship win.

Rolfo was not retained by Ten Kate Honda for 2008 and signed for Althea Honda, taking Hannspree sponsorship with him. He missed the Monza round due to injury. Axed for 2009, he scored a second-row grid position at contract time at Magny-Cours. He was also quick in the rain at Donington before a rash attempt at overtaking Leon Haslam eliminated him and took Haslam out of contention.

For 2009, Rolfo joined the new-to-WSBK Stiggy Racing Honda team, alongside Haslam, but lost the seat following the Qatar round of the season to John Hopkins.

== Career statistics ==
=== Grand Prix motorcycle racing ===
==== By season ====
Season	Class	Motorcycle	Team	Race	Win	Pod	Pole	FLap	Pts	Plcd
1996	250cc	Aprilia	Team Italia	2	0	0	0	0	0	NC
1998	250cc	TSR-Honda	Scuderia Carrizosa	14	0	0	0	0	61	12th
1999	250cc	Aprilia	Vasco Rossi Racing	13	0	0	0	0	62	14th
2000	250cc	TSR-Honda	Tino Villa Racing	4	0	0	0	0	26	16th
2000	250cc	Aprilia	Racing Factory	6	0	0	0	0	26	16th
2001	250cc	Aprilia	Safilo Oxydo Race	16	0	4	0	0	177	4th
2002	250cc	Honda	Fortuna Honda Gresini	16	0	7	0	2	219	**3rd**
2003	250cc	Honda	Fortuna Honda	16	2	6	0	0	235	**2nd**
2004	250cc	Honda	Fortuna Honda	15	1	1	0	1	116	8th
2005	MotoGP	Ducati	Team d’Antin Pramac	17	0	0	0	0	25	18th
2010	Moto2	Suter	Italtrans S.T.R.	17	1	2	0	0	75	14th
2012	Moto2	Suter	Technomag-CIP	11	0	0	0	0	1	30th
2012	MotoGP	ART	Speed Master	4	0	0	0	0	0	NC
2014	Moto2	Suter	Tasca Racing Moto2	2	0	0	0	0	2	29th
Total				**153**	**4**	**20**	**0**	**3**	**999**	

==== By class ====
Class	Season	1st GP	1st Pod	1st Win	Race	Win	Podiums	Pole	FLap	Pts	WChmp
250cc	1996, 1998–2004	1996 Italy	2001 Italy	2003 Germany	102	3	18	0	3	896	0
Moto2	2010, 2012, 2014	2010 Qatar	2010 Germany	2010 Malaysia	30	1	2	0	0	78	0
MotoGP	2005, 2012	2005 Qatar			21	0	0	0	0	25	0
Total	1996, 1998–2005, 2010, 2012, 2014				**153**	**4**	**20**	**0**	**3**	**999**	**0**

==== Races by year ====
(key) (Races in bold indicate pole position) (Races in italics indicate fastest lap)

Year	Class	Bike	1	2	3	4	5	6	7	8	9	10	11	12	13	14	15	16	17	18	Pos.	Pts
1996	250cc	Aprilia	MAL	INA	JPN	SPA	ITA; 27	FRA	NED	GER	GBR	AUT	CZE	IMO; 22	CAT	BRA	AUS				NC	0
1998	250cc	TSR-Honda	JPN; Ret	MAL; 12	SPA; 13	ITA; Ret	FRA; 14	MAD; 10	NED; 10	GBR; 12	GER; 11	CZE; 15	IMO; 8	CAT; 8	AUS; 13	ARG; 5					12th	61
1999	250cc	Aprilia	MAL; 10	JPN; 12	SPA; 9	FRA; Ret	ITA; Ret	CAT; 5	NED; Ret	GBR	GER; 12	CZE; 11	IMO; 10	VAL; 13	AUS; DNS	RSA	BRA; 9	ARG; 7			14th	62
2000	250cc	TSR-Honda	RSA; 15	MAL; 14	JPN; Ret	SPA; 19	FRA	ITA													16th	26
2000	250cc	Aprilia							CAT; Ret	NED; 9	GBR; Ret	GER; 6	CZE	POR	VAL	BRA	PAC; Ret	AUS; 10			16th	26
2001	250cc	Aprilia	JPN; 5	RSA; 8	SPA; 7	FRA; 9	ITA; 2	CAT; 3	NED; Ret	GBR; 2	GER; 4	CZE; 5	POR; 4	VAL; 8	PAC; 5	AUS; 3	MAL; 10	BRA; 8			4th	177
2002	250cc	Honda	JPN; 8	RSA; 4	SPA; 2	FRA; 5	ITA; 8	CAT; 2	NED; 3	GBR; 5	GER; 2	CZE; Ret	POR; 4	BRA; 2	PAC; 6	MAL; 3	AUS; 4	VAL; 2			**3rd**	**219**
2003	250cc	Honda	JPN; 7	RSA; 5	SPA; 2	FRA; 3	ITA; 4	CAT; 9	NED; 6	GBR; 5	GER; 1	CZE; 4	POR; 4	BRA; 2	PAC; 2	MAL; 4	AUS; 1	VAL; 7			**2nd**	**235**
2004	250cc	Honda	RSA; 9	SPA; 1	FRA; Ret	ITA; 7	CAT; Ret	NED; 9	BRA; 7	GER; 6	GBR; DNS	CZE; 6	POR; 10	JPN; 7	QAT; 7	MAL; Ret	AUS; 10	VAL; 7			8th	116
2005	MotoGP	Ducati	SPA; 15	POR; 13	CHN; 16	FRA; 15	ITA; 17	CAT; 14	NED; 18	USA; Ret	GBR; 10	GER; 14	CZE; 17	JPN; Ret	MAL; 13	QAT; 12	AUS; 13	TUR; 16	VAL; Ret		18th	25
2010	Moto2	Suter	QAT; 5	SPA; 12	FRA; 10	ITA; 18	GBR; 24	NED; Ret	CAT; Ret	GER; 3	CZE; Ret	INP; 25	RSM; 10	ARA; 19	JPN; 9	MAL; 1	AUS; 26	POR; Ret	VAL; 25		14th	75
2012	Moto2	Suter	QAT; Ret	SPA; 25	POR; 21	FRA; 15	CAT; Ret	GBR; 16	NED; 19	GER; 20	ITA; Ret		INP; Ret	CZE; 19	RSM	ARA					30th	1
2012	MotoGP	ART										USA					JPN; 16	MAL; DSQ	AUS; Ret	VAL; Ret	NC	0
2014	Moto2	Suter	QAT	AME	ARG	SPA	FRA	ITA	CAT	NED	GER	INP	CZE	GBR	RSM	ARA	JPN	AUS	MAL; 14	VAL; 20	29th	2

=== Superbike World Championship ===
==== Races by year ====
(key) (Races in bold indicate pole position) (Races in italics indicate fastest lap)

Year	Make	1		2		3		4		5		6		7		8		9		10		11		12		13		14		Pos.	Pts
Year	Make	R1	R2	R1	R2	R1	R2	R1	R2	R1	R2	R1	R2	R1	R2	R1	R2	R1	R2	R1	R2	R1	R2	R1	R2	R1	R2	R1	R2	Pos.	Pts
2006	Ducati	QAT; 7	QAT; 13	AUS; 5	AUS; 7	SPA; Ret	SPA; 16	ITA; 8	ITA; 10	EUR; 17	EUR; 19	SMR; 15	SMR; 15	CZE; 12	CZE; 17	GBR; 18	GBR; 18	NED; 8	NED; 12	GER; Ret	GER; 17	ITA; 14	ITA; 15	FRA; 14	FRA; 17					16th	69
2007	Honda	QAT; 7	QAT; Ret	AUS; 11	AUS; 10	EUR; 9	EUR; 7	SPA; 10	SPA; 12	NED; 9	NED; 5	ITA; Ret	ITA; 4	GBR; 4	GBR; C	SMR; 5	SMR; 8	CZE; 5	CZE; 5	GBR; 6	GBR; 11	GER; 5	GER; 7	ITA; Ret	ITA; 5	FRA; 10	FRA; 7			8th	192
2008	Honda	QAT; 11	QAT; 15	AUS; 10	AUS; 16	SPA; 10	SPA; 17	NED; 22	NED; 14	ITA	ITA	USA; 20	USA; 16	GER; 16	GER; 17	SMR; 17	SMR; 18	CZE; Ret	CZE; 12	GBR; 10	GBR; 14	EUR; Ret	EUR; 13	ITA; 8	ITA; 10	FRA; Ret	FRA; 10	POR; 12	POR; 18	17th	59
2009	Honda	AUS; 13	AUS; 16	QAT; Ret	QAT; Ret	SPA	SPA	NED	NED	ITA	ITA	RSA	RSA	USA	USA	SMR	SMR	GBR	GBR	CZE	CZE	GER	GER	ITA	ITA	FRA	FRA	POR	POR	39th	3
2011	Kawasaki	AUS; 11	AUS; 12	EUR; 14	EUR; 15	NED; Ret	NED; 16	ITA; Ret	ITA; 13	USA; 17	USA; 16	SMR; Ret	SMR; 12	SPA; 14	SPA; 13	CZE; 14	CZE; 11	GBR; 13	GBR; Ret	GER; 14	GER; 13	ITA; 18	ITA; Ret	FRA; 13	FRA; Ret	POR	POR			18th	42
2017	Kawasaki	AUS	AUS	THA	THA	SPA	SPA	NED	NED	ITA	ITA	GBR	GBR	ITA	ITA	USA	USA	GER	GER	POR	POR	FRA	FRA	SPA	SPA	QAT; 13	QAT; 15			33rd	4

=== Supersport World Championship ===
==== Races by year ====
(key) (Races in bold indicate pole position) (Races in italics indicate fastest lap)

Year	Bike	1	2	3	4	5	6	7	8	9	10	11	12	13	Pos.	Pts
2013	MV Agusta	AUS; Ret	SPA; 9	NED; 6	ITA; 11	GBR; 3	POR; Ret	ITA; 14	RUS; C	GBR; 6	GER; 15	TUR; 5	FRA; Ret	SPA; 3	6th	78
2014	Kawasaki	AUS; 11	SPA; 12	NED; 6	ITA; 5	GBR; 10	MAL; 4	ITA; 10	POR; 9	SPA; 7	FRA; 3	QAT; 6			7th	97
2015	Honda	AUS; 8	THA; 6	SPA; 10	NED; 5	ITA; 10	GBR; 11	POR; 8	ITA; 12	MAL; 6	SPA; 10	FRA; 11	QAT; 7		7th	88
2016	MV Agusta	AUS; 9	THA; 18	SPA; Ret	NED; 22	ITA; 14	MAL; 12	GBR; 14	ITA; Ret	GER; 18	FRA; 16	SPA; Ret	QAT; Ret		24th	15
2017	MV Agusta	AUS; 1	THA; 11	SPA; 6	NED; 15	ITA; Ret	GBR; 14	ITA; 18	GER	POR					12th	43
2017	Honda										FRA; Ret	SPA	QAT		12th	43
2019	Kawasaki	AUS	THA	SPA	NED	ITA	SPA	ITA; 23	GBR	POR	FRA	ARG	QAT		NC*	0*

* Season still in progress.
