= Aprilia RSV4 =

Super bike manufactured by Aprilia

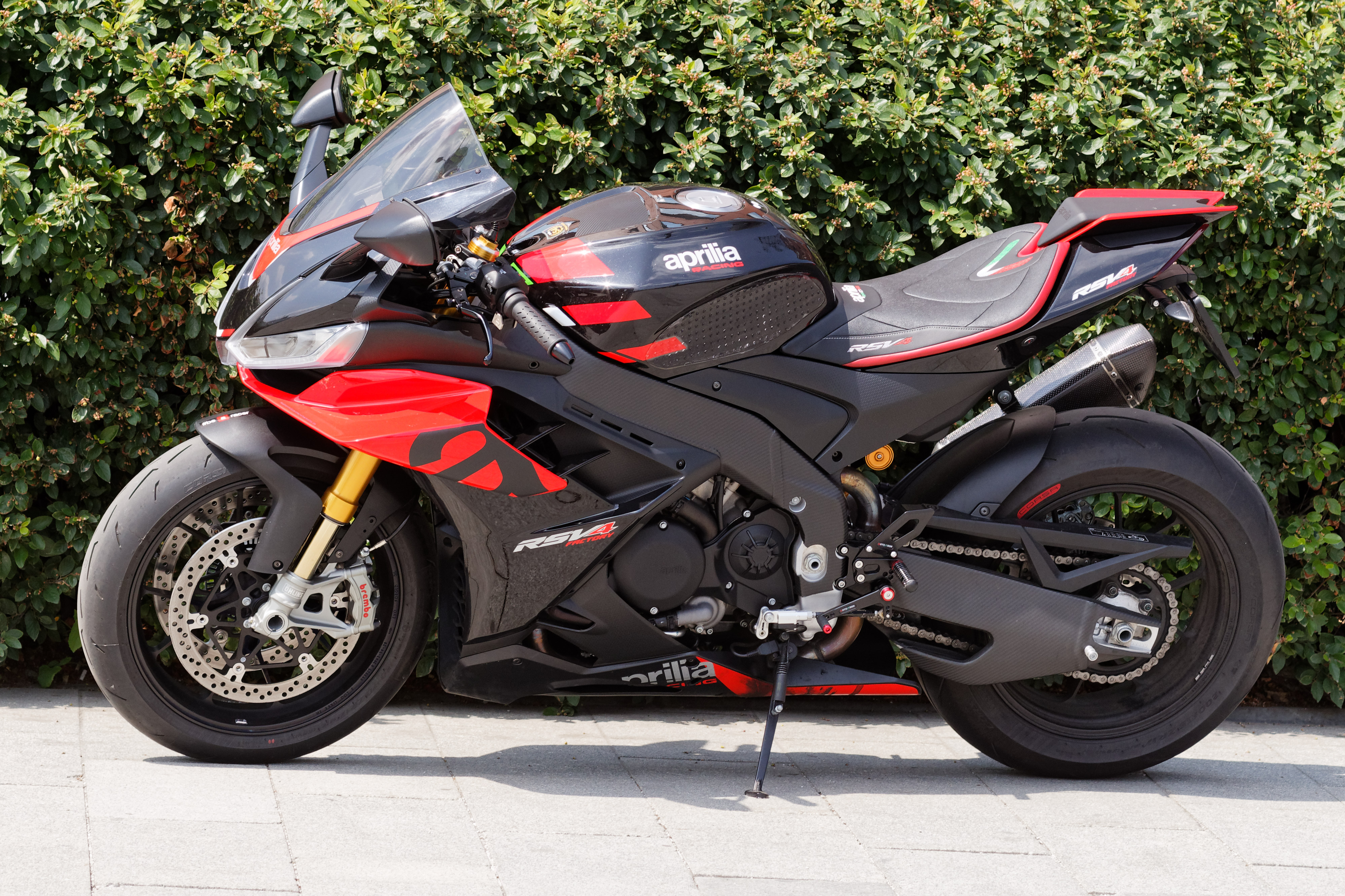
- Manufacturer: Aprilia
- Parent company: Piaggio
- Production: 2009-present
- Predecessor: Aprilia RSV 1000 R
- Class: Sport bike
- Engine: 999.6 cc (61 cu in) 65-degree V4; 1,099 cc (67 cu in) (2021)
- Bore / stroke: 78.0 mm × 52.3 mm (3.07 in × 2.06 in); 81.0 mm × 53.32 mm (3.189 in × 2.099 in)
- Top speed: 177.7 mph (286.0 km/h)
- Power: 201 hp (150 kW)(claimed) @ 13,000 rpm 152.7 hp (113.9 kW) (rear wheel); 217 hp (162 kW)(claimed) @ 13,200 rpm 190 hp (140 kW) (rear wheel) (2021+)
- Torque: 85 lb⋅ft (115.2 N⋅m)(claimed) @ 10,500 rpm 73 lb⋅ft (99 N⋅m) (rear wheel); 92.19 lb⋅ft (125.0 N⋅m)(claimed) @ 10,500 rpm (2021+)
- Transmission: 6-speed, wet clutch
- Brakes: Front: Dual 320 mm diameter floating discs, Brembo monobloc radial 4-piston calipers Rear: 220 mm diameter disc, Brembo 2-piston calipers
- Tires: Front: 120/70 ZR17; Rear: 200/55 ZR17
- Wheelbase: 55.9 in (1,420 mm)
- Seat height: 845 mm (33.3 in)
- Weight: 180 kg (397 lb) (dry); 208 kg (458 lb) (wet)
- Fuel capacity: 18.5 L (4.1 imp gal; 4.9 US gal)

The Aprilia RSV4 is a super bike manufactured by Aprilia. The RSV4 is Aprilia's flagship model. Aprilia offers two models of the bike: the RSV4 Factory and RSV4 R limited edition (only 350). For 2016 it is offered in two models the RSV4 RR and RSV4 RF. The 2016 updated bike was made to take advantage of and comply with that year's Superbike rules which allow fewer modifications for production bikes. It has more power, is lighter, and has improved handling and electronics.

Since 2021 the bike is offered in two models, too: RSV4 1100 and RSV4 1100 Factory. Now it offers APRC system (Aprilia Performance Ride Control) that includes engine maps (AEM), engine brake control (AEB), traction control (ATC), wheelie control (AWC), launch control (ALC), cruise control (ACC), speed limiter (APT). 6 riding modes (3 Road, 3 Track) and is Euro 5 compliant.

The RSV4 1100 Factory is differentiated by Smart EC 2.0 electronically managed Öhlins NIX front fork, Öhlins TTX monoshock with Smart EC 2.0 electronically managed piggy-back rear shock and aluminium alloy forged, completely machined, 5-spoke wheels.

== History ==
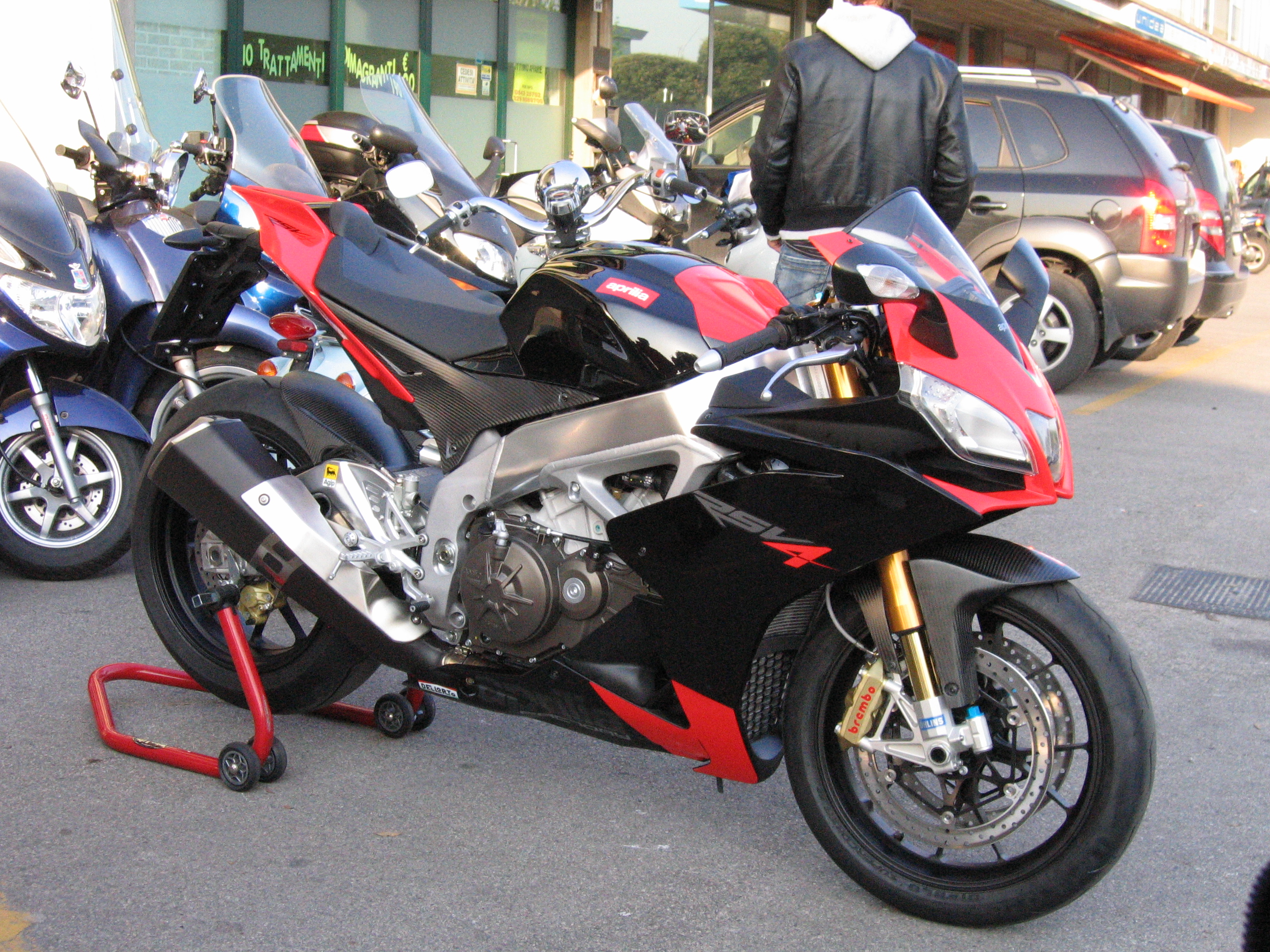
2014 Aprilia RSV4

Production of the motorcycle began in 2008. The motorcycle was unveiled on 22 February 2008, at the International Piaggio Group Convention in Milan, Italy. It is powered by a 65-degree 999.6 cc (61 cu in) V-4 engine, the company's first production four-cylinder engine. Aprilia claims that the new engine was designed specifically for superbike racing and that the engine will produce over 200 horsepower (150 kW) in race configuration.

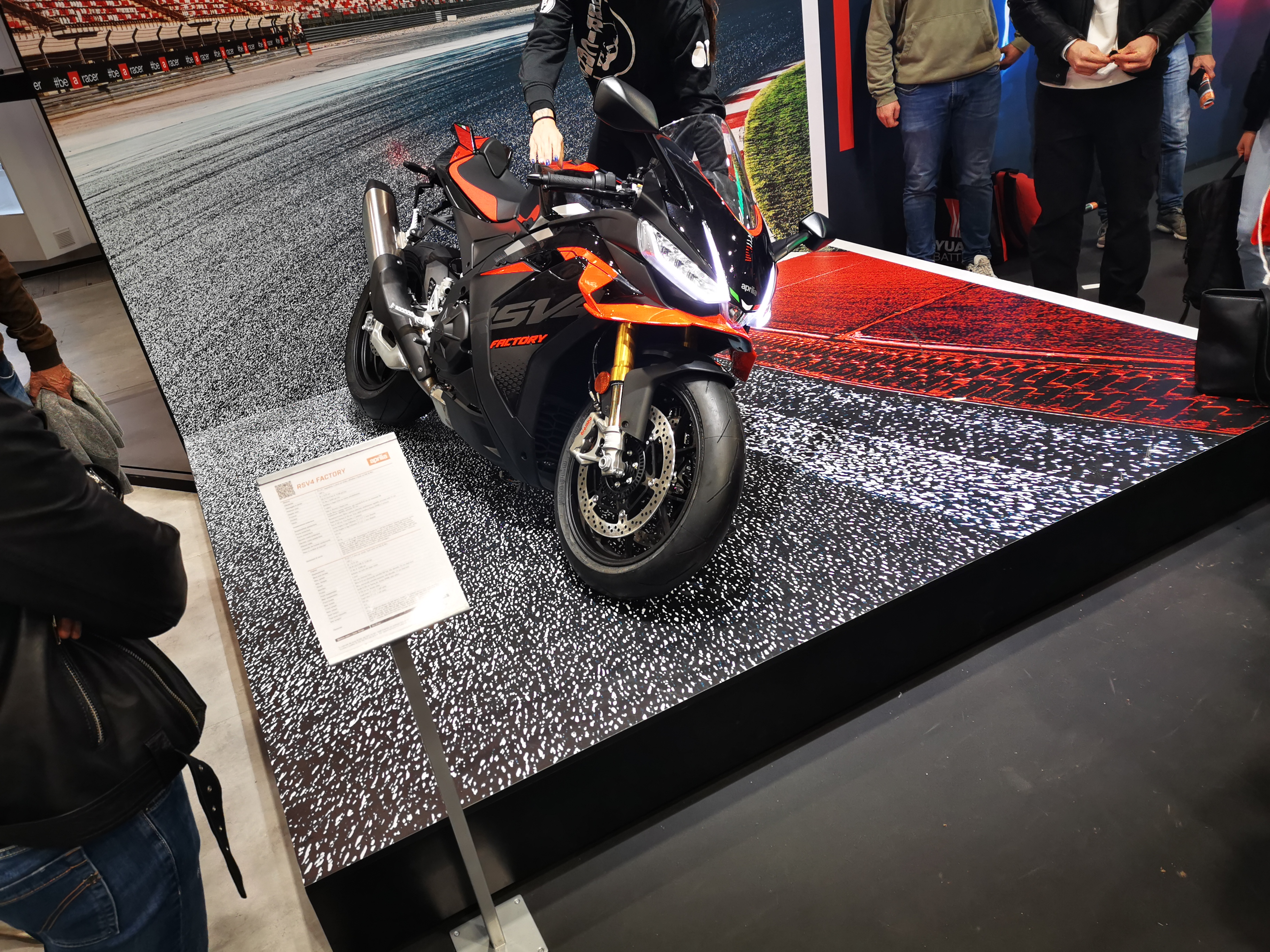
2024 Aprilia RSV4 Factory

Since 2021 the engine's displacement has been increased to 1,099 cc, maximum power increased to 217 horsepower (162 kW) at 13,200 rpm and maximum torque to 92.19 ft-lbs (125 Nm) at 10,500 rpm.

2026 Aprilia RSV4 Obscure

Aprilia launched the bike to race in the 2009 Superbike World Championship season.

== RSV4 X-GP ==
In 2025, Aprilia Racing introduced the RSV4 X-GP, a limited edition of 30 units created to celebrate the tenth anniversary of the RS-GP’s debut in MotoGP. It is powered by a 1,099 cc V4 engine delivering 238 hp and 131 Nm of torque, managed by the APX Aprilia Racing electronics with gear-by-gear adjustable strategies.

== Racing ==
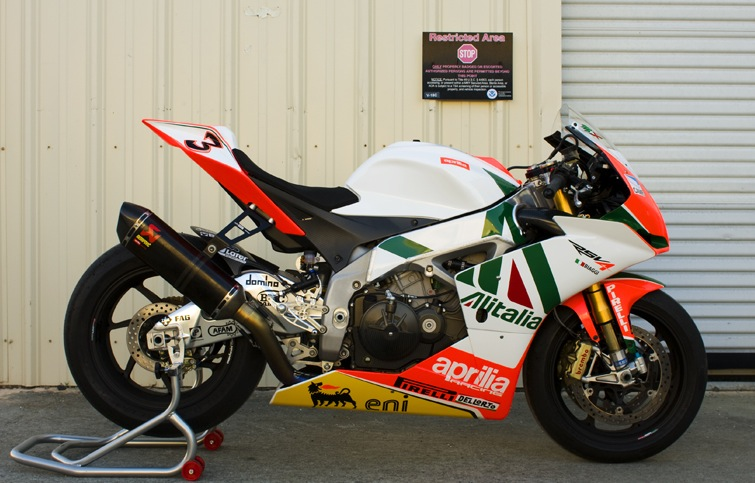
Max Biaggi race replica

In 2009, its first full season of World Superbike racing, Max Biaggi aboard the RSV4 reached the podium nine times, and won one race at the Brno Circuit. Aprilia factory teammate Shinya Nakano ended the season in 14th place.

Biaggi won the championship in 2010, and was contracted to race the bike for another two seasons, citing his positive experience with the team and development of the bike into a successful racer and, despite his age, wanting to continue with the momentum they had built up. Max Biaggi ended his career winning the 2012 title with the RSV4.

The Aprilia RSV4 is available as a customer-specified race bike from the factory as a Max Biaggi replica.

Sylvain Guintoli won the 2014 Superbike World Championship season riding an RSV4 for the factory Aprilia racing team. Lorenzo Savadori won the 2015 FIM Superstock 1000 Cup season.

A bike based on the RSV4 was used by Aspar Team and Paul Bird Motorsports, coming 11th and 12th in the 2012 and 2013 Grand Prix motorcycle racing seasons.
