= Honda CBF1000 =

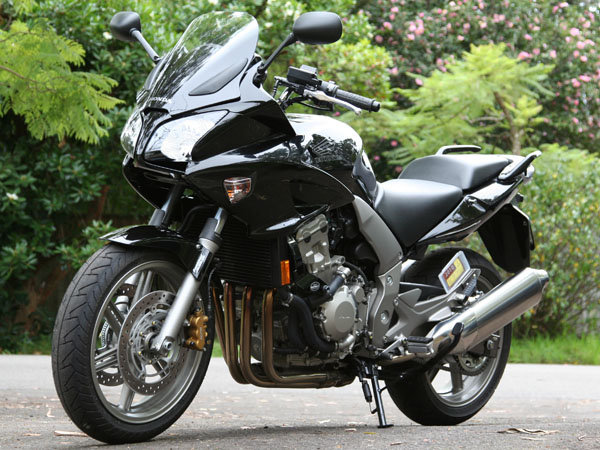
- 2008 CBF1000
- Manufacturer: Honda
- Production: 2006–2013
- Successor: Honda CB1000GT
- Class: Sport touring
- Engine: 998 cc (60.9 cu in) liquid-cooled 4-stroke 16-valve DOHC inline-4
- Transmission: 6-speed
- Brakes: Front: three piston calliper with dual 296 mm (11.7 in) discs Rear: Three piston calliper with single 240 mm (9.4 in) disc
- Tires: Front: 120/70-17; Rear: 160/60-17
- Rake, trail: 26.0°, 110 mm (4.3 in)
- Wheelbase: 1,480 mm (58.3 in)
- Dimensions: L: 2,155 mm (84.8 in); W: 780 mm (30.7 in); H: 1,240 mm (48.8 in)
- Seat height: 795 mm (31.3 in)
- Weight: 220 kg (490 lb) (dry); 245–250 kg (540–551 lb) (wet)
- Fuel capacity: 19 L (4.2 imp gal; 5.0 US gal) (CBF1000); 20 L (4.4 imp gal; 5.3 US gal) (CBF1000F)

The Honda CBF1000 is a sport touring motorcycle, part of the CBF series produced by Honda from 2006 to 2018. It is powered by a 998 cc inline-four engine, which is based on the CBR1000RR Fireblade engine. The CBF1000 has a steel frame based on the similar CBF600. Produced by Honda Italia Industriale S.p.A., the CBF1000 was first available in March 2006, mainly in the European market.

The chief designer, Ishu Akari, targeted riders over 30, that prefer smooth progressive acceleration combined with a relaxed riding position and easy handling. In comparison to the high-revving characteristic of the CBR1000RR's engine, the CBF1000's engine has a more level power delivery, better suited to touring and relatively inexperienced riders. Although peak power and peak torque are significantly lower than the CBR1000RR engine, power and torque are higher in the lower rev range. The CBF1000 has programmed fuel injection (PGM-FI). Anti-lock braking system is an option but a combined half-fairing is standard. The handlebars, seat height, and screen height are adjustable.

The CBF1000GT version adds a full lower fairing, panniers, and top box. The CBF1000F, a new design, was released in 2010. The major changes were a new frame, made of aluminum rather than steel, four-into-one exhaust system replacing the original four-into-two, new digital instrument panels, and a redesigned fairing/screen. Power was also increased while weight and fuel consumption were reduced.

== Specifications ==
Specifications
	CBF1000 SC58	CBF1000 SC64
Engine type	Liquid-cooled, 4-stroke, 16-valve, DOHC, inline-4	
Engine displacement	998 cm^{3}	
Power output (at crank)	72 kW (96.6 hp) @ 8,000 rpm	79 kW (105.9 hp) @ 9,000 rpm
Fuel system	PGM-FI (fuel injection)	
Fuel capacity	19 L (4.2 imp gal; 5.0 US gal)	20 L (4.4 imp gal; 5.3 US gal)
Transmission	6-speed, chain final drive	
Front tyre:	120/70ZR17 M/C (58W)	
Rear tyre:	160/60ZR17 M/C (69W)	
Wet weight	250 kg (550 lb)	245 kg (540 lb)
