= Honda CBF series =

Motorcycle series

The Honda CBF models are a series of Honda standard motorcycles. With the exception of the single-cylinder CBF125, CBF150M, CBF190R and CBF250, all CBF motorbikes have inline engines.

== Types ==
The series includes:

=== Single-cylinder ===
- CBF125 (2008–2018)
- CBF150M (2005–2012)
- CBF190R (2015–present)
- CBF250 (2004–2012)

=== Inline-twin ===
- CBF500 (2004–2008)

=== Inline-four ===
- CBF600 (2004–2013)
- CBF1000 (2006–2018)
