= Honda CBR1000RR =

Sport bike produced by Honda

Honda CBR1000RR Fireblade
- 2024 Honda CBR1000RR-R Fireblade SP
- Manufacturer: Honda
- Also called: Fireblade
- Production: 2004–present (as seventh-generation Fireblade)
- Predecessor: Honda CBR954RR
- Class: Sport bike
- Engine: 998–999 cc (60.9–61.0 cu in) liquid-cooled 4-stroke 16-valve DOHC inline-four
- Related: Honda CBR600RR

The Honda CBR1000RR, marketed in some countries with the Fireblade suffix (capitalized as FireBlade until the 2000s), is a sport bike produced by Honda since 2004 as the seventh generation of the CBR Fireblade series of motorcycles that began with the CBR900RR in 1992.

== History ==
=== Racing roots ===
The Honda CBR1000RR was developed by the same team that was behind the MotoGP series. Many of the new technologies introduced in the CBR600RR were used in the new CBR1000RR such as a lengthy swingarm, Unit Pro-Link rear suspension, and Dual Stage Fuel Injection System (DSFI).

=== 2004–2005 (SC57) ===
The seventh-generation RR (SC57), the Honda CBR1000RR, was the successor to the 2002 CBR954RR. While evolving the CBR954RR design, few parts were carried over to the CBR1000RR. The compact 998 cc (60.9 cu in) in-line four was a new design, with different bore and stroke dimensions, race-inspired cassette-type six-speed gearbox, all-new ECU-controlled ram-air system, dual-stage fuel injection, and center-up exhaust with a new computer-controlled butterfly valve. The chassis was likewise all-new, including an organic-style aluminum frame composed of Gravity Die-Cast main sections and Fine Die-Cast steering head structure, inverted fork, Unit Pro-Link rear suspension, radial-mounted front brakes, and a centrally located fuel tank hidden under a faux cover. Additionally, the Honda Electronic Steering Damper (HESD) debuted as an industry first system which aimed to improve stability and help eliminate head shake while automatically adjusting for high and low speed steering effort.

A longer swingarm acted as a longer lever arm in the rear suspension for superior traction under acceleration and more progressive suspension action. Longer than the corresponding unit on the CBR954RR (585 mm (23.0 in) compared to 551 mm (21.7 in)) the CBR1000RR's 34 mm (1.3 in) longer swingarm made up 41.6 percent of its total wheelbase. The CBR1000RR's wheelbase also increased, measuring 1,405 mm (55.3 in); a 5 mm (0.20 in) increase over the 954.

Accommodating the longer swingarm was another reason the CBR1000RR power plant shared nothing with the 954. Shortening the engine compared to the 954 meant rejecting the conventional in-line layout. Instead, engineers positioned the CBR1000RR's crankshaft, main shaft and countershaft in a triangulated configuration, with the countershaft located below the main shaft, dramatically shortening the engine front to back, and moving the swingarm pivot closer to the crankshaft. This configuration was first successfully introduced by Yamaha with the YZF-R1 model in 1998 and inspired superbike design in the following years.

Positioning this compact engine farther forward in the chassis also increased front-end weight bias, an effective method of making high-powered liter bikes less wheelie prone under hard acceleration. This approach, however, also provided very little space between the engine and front wheel for a large radiator. Engineers solved this problem by giving the RR a modest cylinder incline of 28°, and moving the oil filter from its frontal placement on the 954 to the right side of the 1000RR engine. This allowed the RR's center-up exhaust system to tuck closely to the engine.

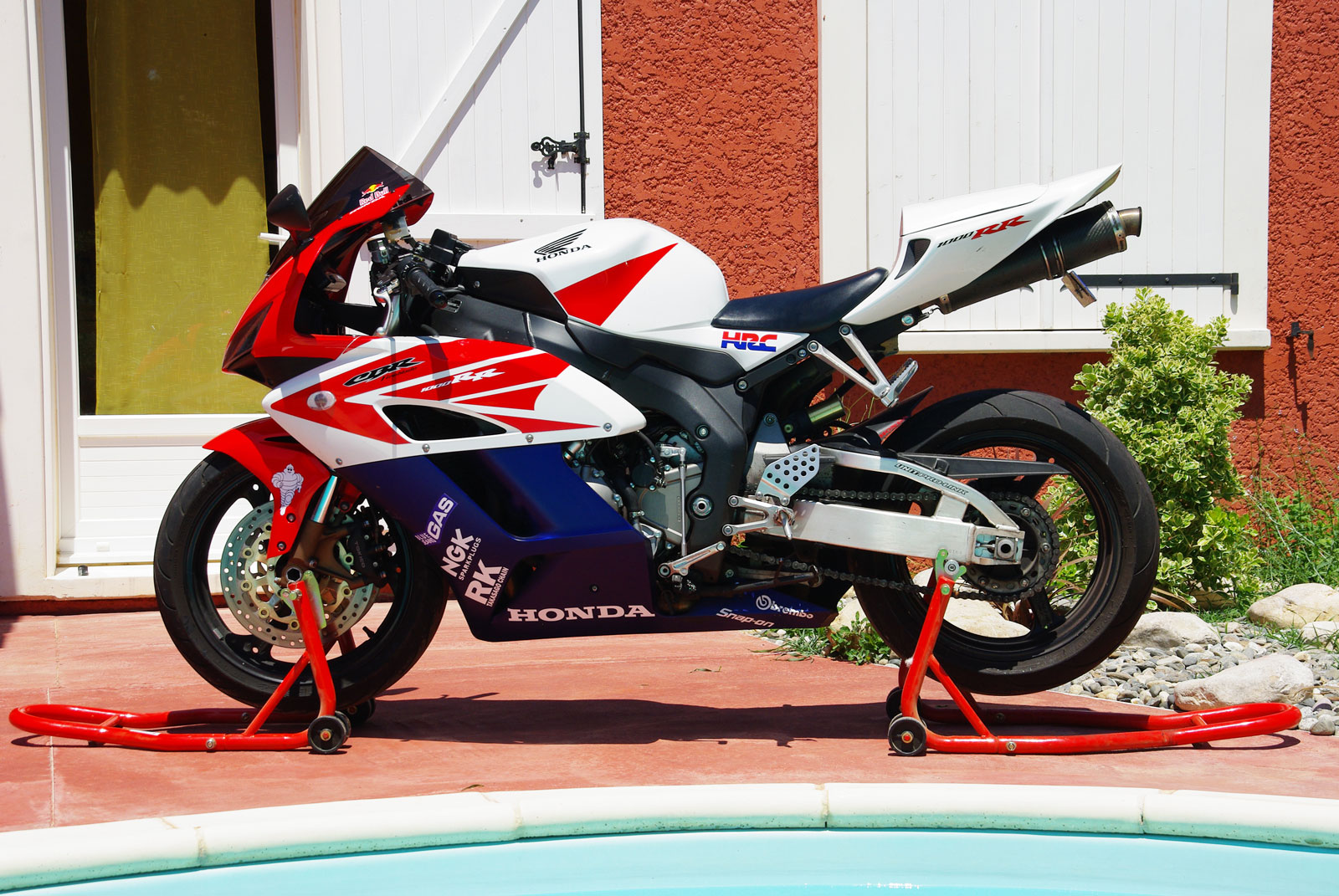
2004 CBR1000RR

=== 2006–2007 (SC57 II) ===
The eighth generation RR (SC57 II) was introduced in 2006 and offered incremental advancements over the earlier model, and less weight. Changes for 2006 included: A revised front fairing design, new rear suspension with new linkage ratios 135 mm, along with a new chassis geometry, and a new lighter swingarm. A new intake and exhaust porting (higher flow, reduced chamber volume). A higher compression ratio (from 11.9:1 to 12.3:1). The cam timing was revised. Intake valve lift was increased from 8.9 mm to 9.1 mm. Double springs for the intake valves were implemented. The engine RPM redline was increased from 11,250rpm to 12,200rpm. A larger rear sprocket was fitted (from 41 to 42 teeth). New exhaust system. The disk brakes were changed with a larger diameter 320 mm (13 in) front brake discs but thinner at 4.5 mm (0.18 in) as well as a larger 220 mm (8.7 in) rear brake discs but thinner at 4.5 mm (0.18 in) Along with a smaller, lighter rear caliper.

The 2006 model carried over to the 2007 model year mostly unchanged except for color options.

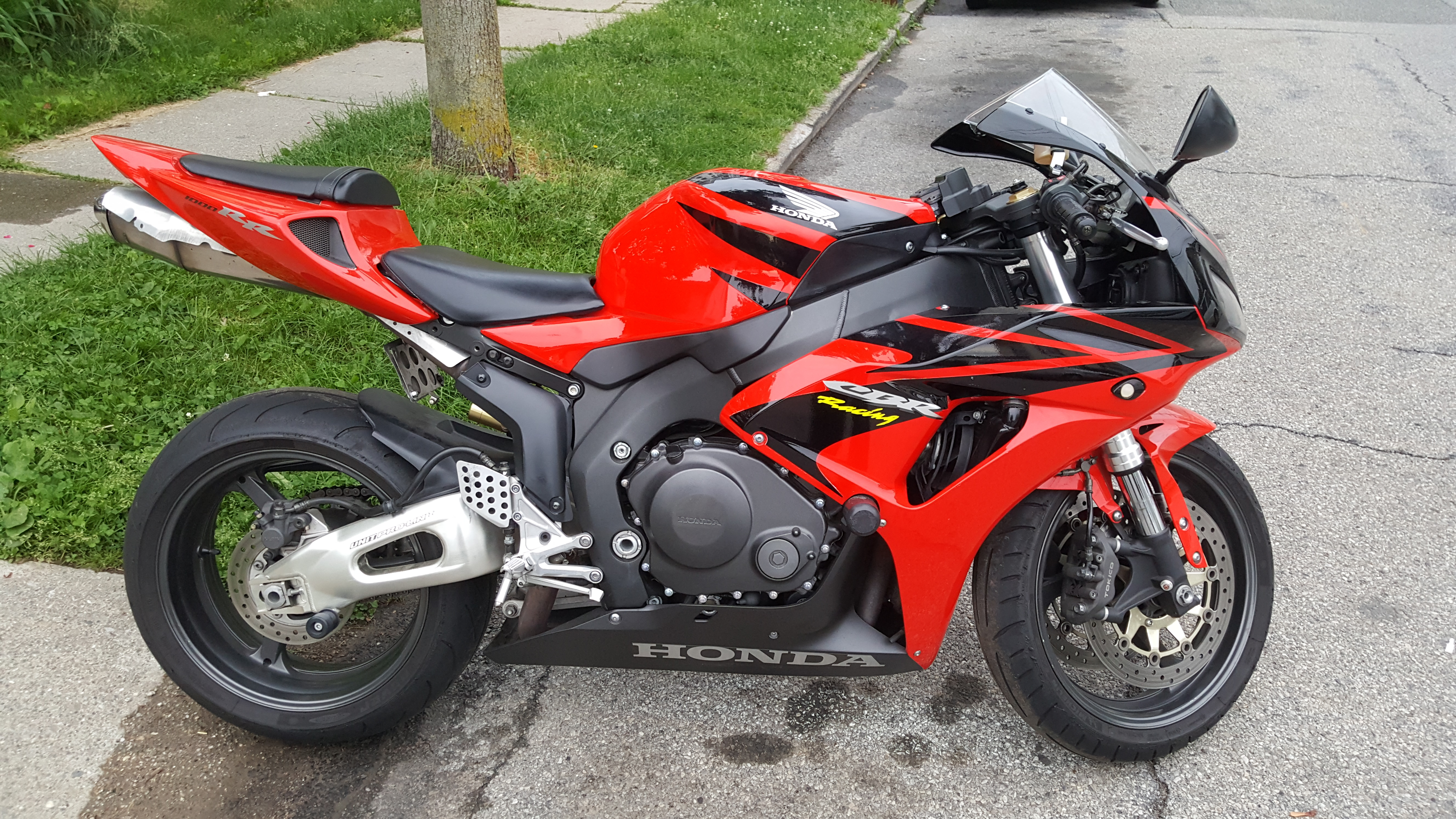
2006 CBR1000RR

=== 2008–2011 (SC59) ===
An all-new ninth-generation RR (SC59), the CBR1000RR was introduced at the Paris International Motorcycle Show on September 28, 2007, for the 2008 model year. The CBR1000RR was powered by an all-new 999 cc (61.0 cu in) inline-four engine with a redline of 13,000 rpm. It had titanium valves and an enlarged bore with a corresponding reduced stroke. The engine had a completely new cylinder block, head configuration, and crankcase with lighter pistons. A new ECU had two separate revised maps sending the fuel and air mixture to be squeezed tight by the 12.3:1 compression ratio. Ram air was fed to an enlarged air box through two revised front scoops located under the headlamps.

Honda made a very focused effort to reduce and centralize overall weight. A lighter, narrower die-cast frame was formed using a new technique which Honda claimed allowed for very thin wall construction and only four castings to be welded together. Almost every part of the new bike was reengineered to reduce weight, including the sidestand, front brake hoses, brake rotors, battery, and wheels.

In order to improve stability under deceleration, a slipper clutch was added, with a center-cam-assist mechanism. The Honda Electronic Steering Damper was revised as well. Another significant change was the exhaust system, which was no longer a center-up underseat design. The new exhaust was a side-slung design in order to increase mass centralization and compactness while mimicking a MotoGP-style.

==== 2009 ====
On September 5, 2008, Honda announced the tenth generation of the RR as a 2009 model. The bike remained much the same, in terms of engine, styling, and performance. The only significant addition was the introduction of the optional factory fitted Combined ABS (C-ABS) system originally showcased on the CBR600RR Combined ABS prototype. Lightweight turn signals were also added.

==== 2010 ====
On September 4, 2009, Honda announced the eleventh generation of the RR as a 2010 model. Honda increased the diameter of the flywheel for more inertia. This improved low-rpm torque and smoother running just off idle. The license plate assembly was redesigned for quicker removal when preparing the motorcycle for track use. The muffler cover was also redesigned for improved appearance.

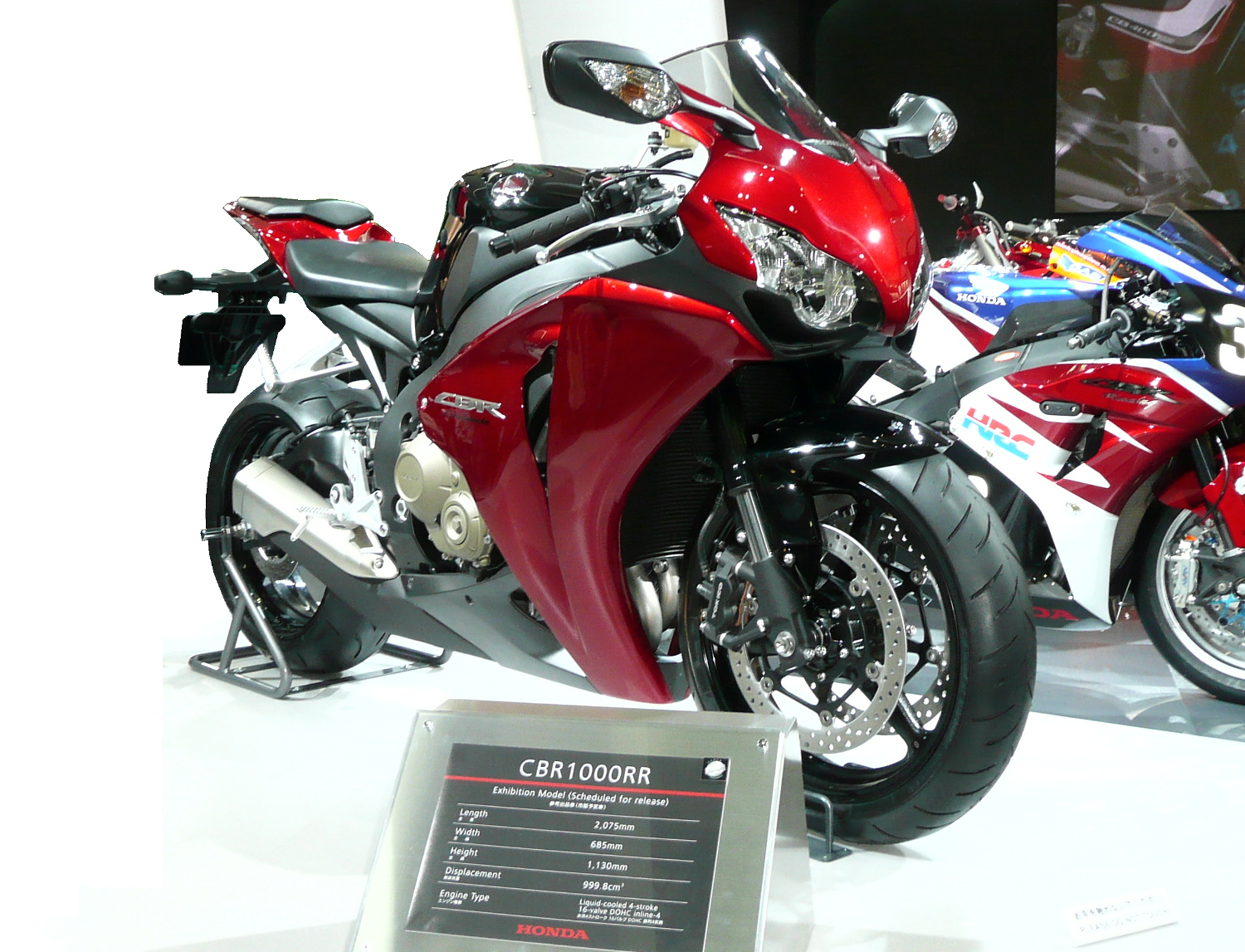
2008 CBR1000RR

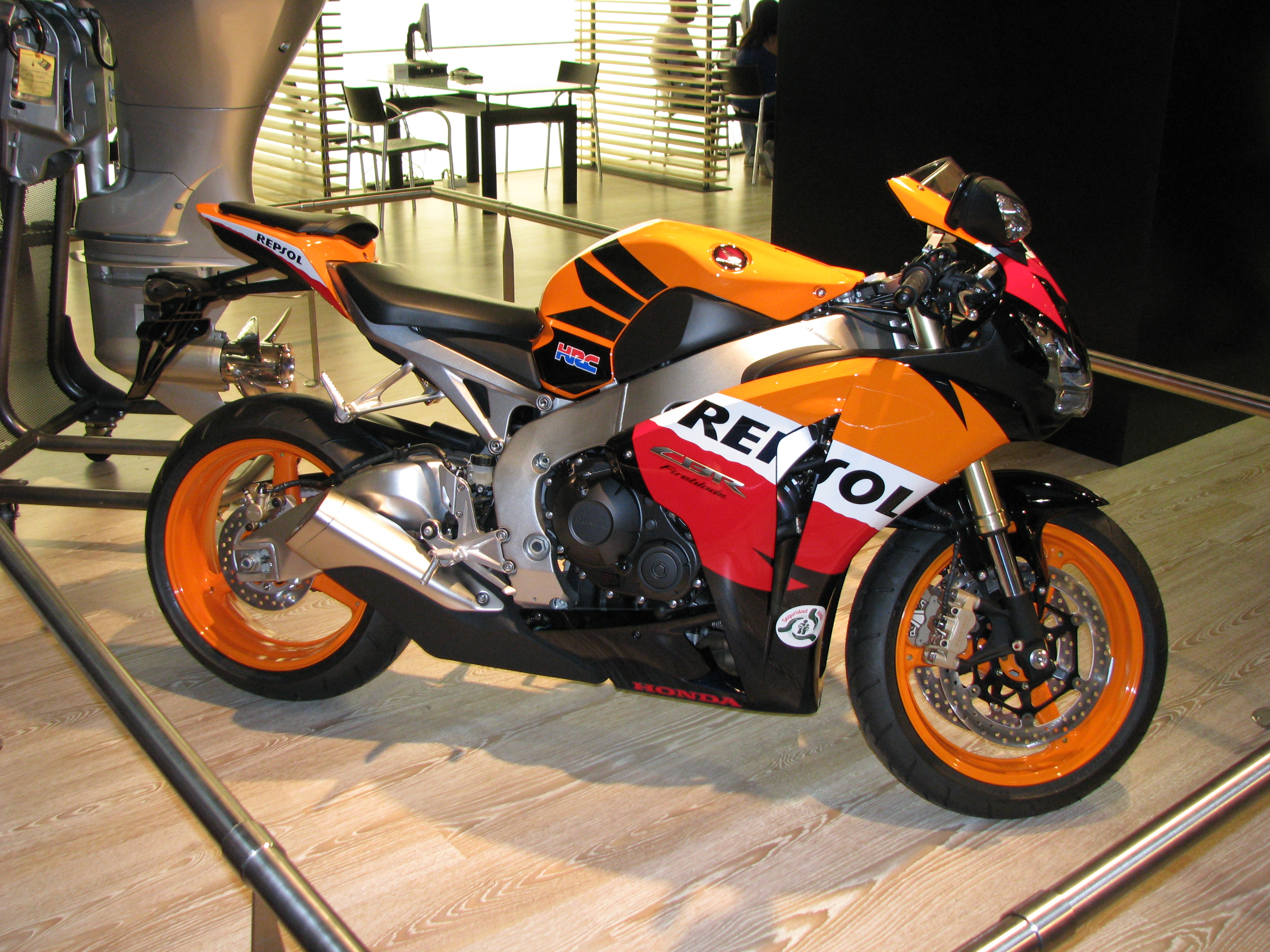
2009 CBR1000RR

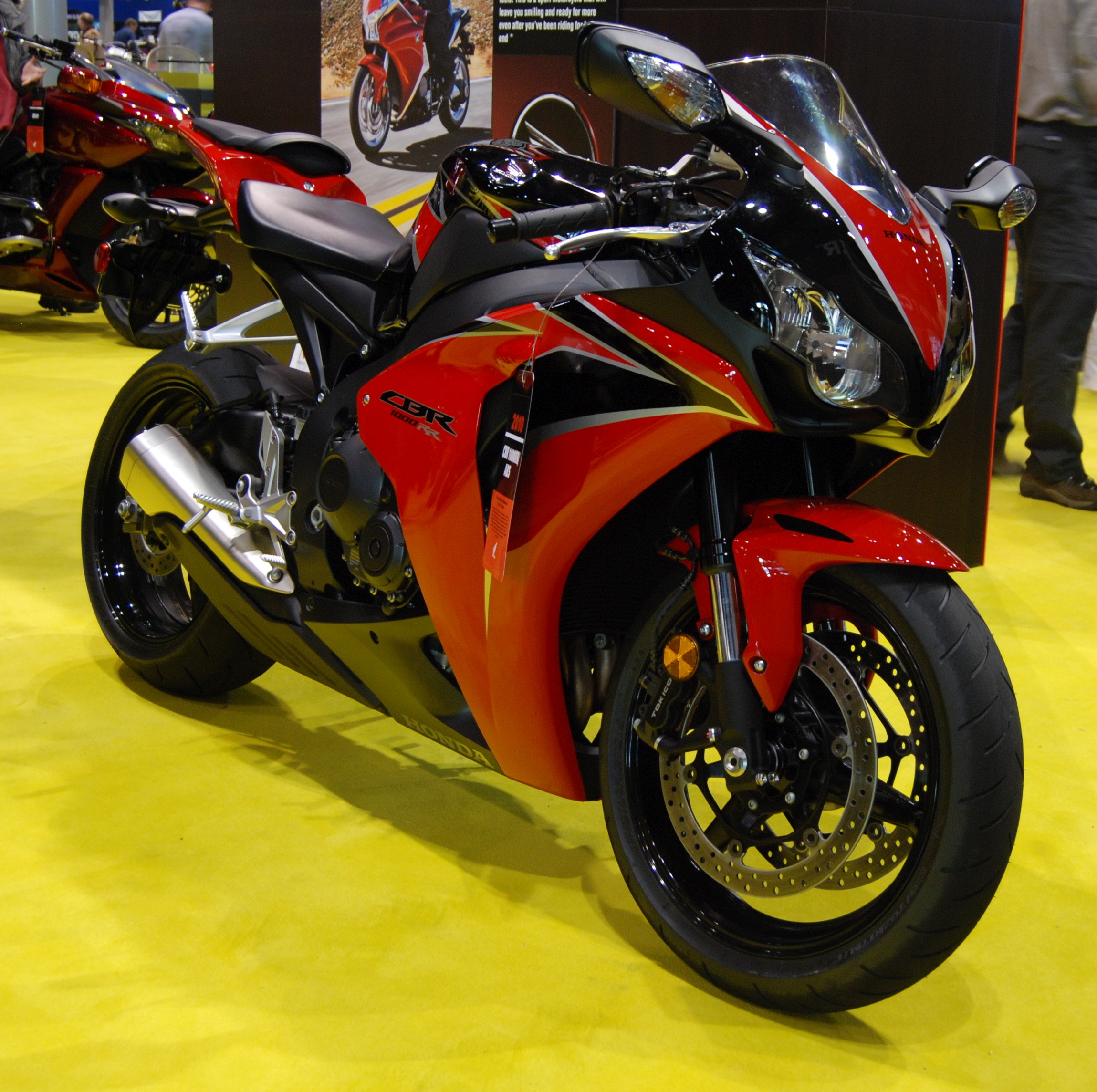
2010 CBR1000RR

=== 2012–2016 (SC59 II) ===
The twelfth-generation Fireblade celebrated its 20th anniversary, revised for 2012, featuring Showa's Big Piston suspension technology, Showa balance-free shock, further improved software for the combined ABS, new 12-spoke wheels, aerodynamic tweaks, an all LCD and other minor updates.

==== 2014 ====
Retuned engine for additional power, modified rider position along with new windscreen. Also added a performance oriented "SP" variant.

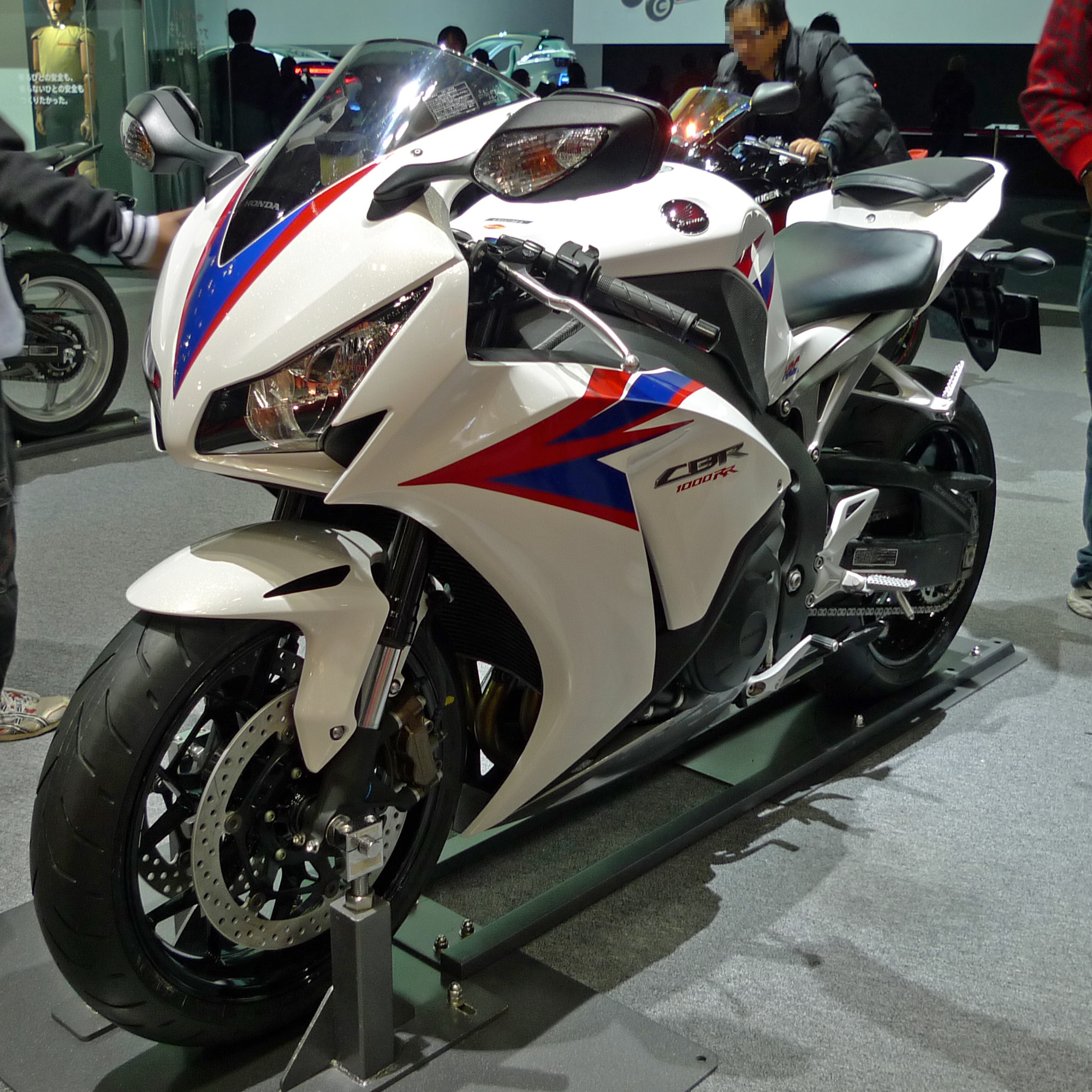
2012 CBR1000RR

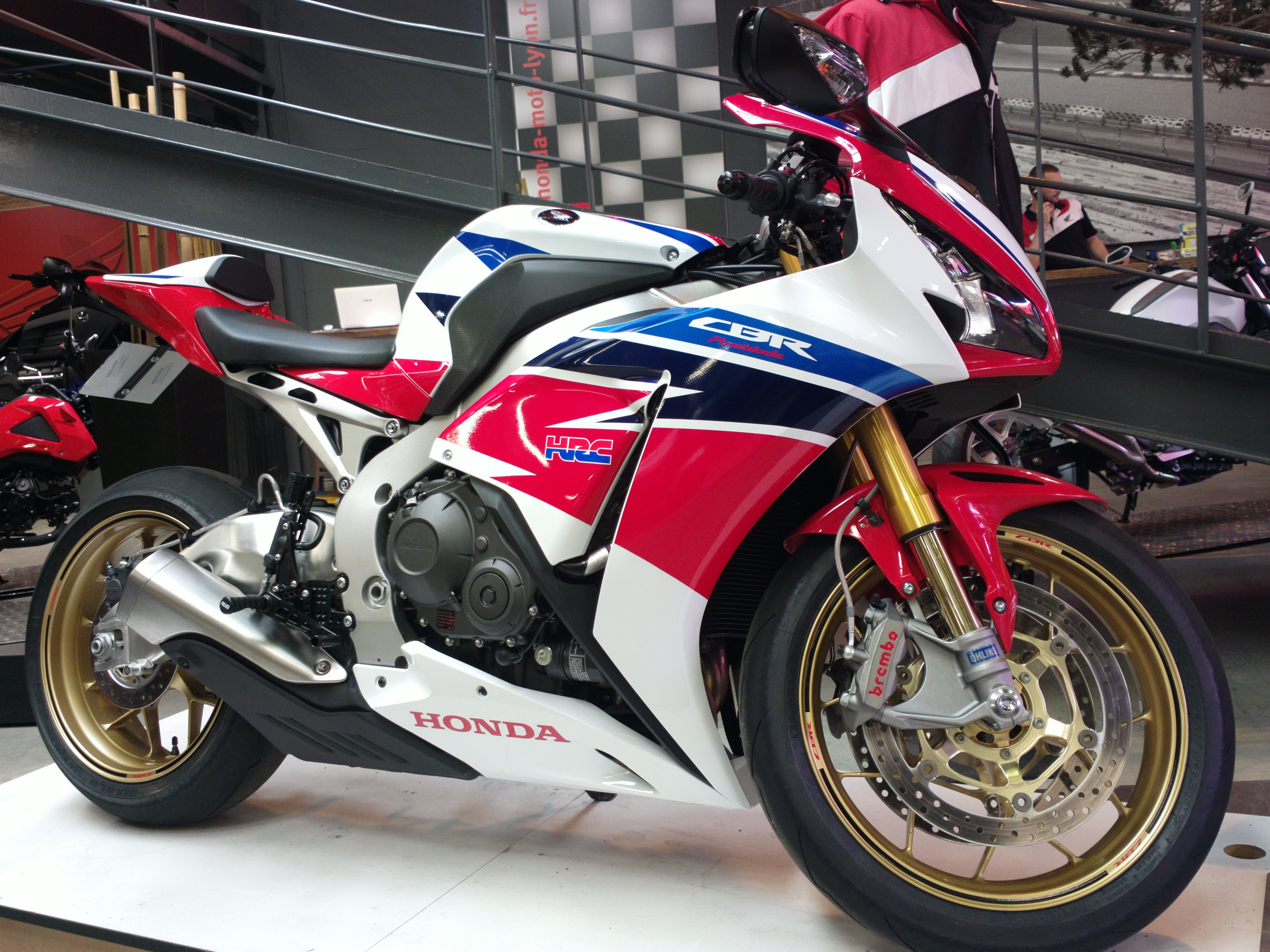
2014 CBR1000RR SP

=== 2017–2019 (SC77) ===
For 2017, with the 25th anniversary of the Fireblade, Honda has updated its flagship CBR (SC77) with new bodywork and features such as throttle-by-wire and traction control for the first time that works with selectable ride modes. A retuned engine which now produces a claimed 189 hp (141 kW) and 153.2 hp (114.2 kW) at the rear wheel, a 10 hp increase, titanium muffler and a 14 kg (33 lb) weight reduction (compared with previous ABS model) for a wet weight of 196 kg (433 lb). Some of the new features on the SP model are semi-active Öhlins Electronic Control suspension (S-EC), Brembo monobloc four-piston front brake calipers, titanium fuel tank and a 13:1 compression ratio. Also adding an even more exotic limited production "SP2" variant with Marchesini forged wheels and with larger valves of which 500 units will be sold.

==== 2019 ====
The CBR1000RR Fireblade received some electronic updates for 2019. The traction control is now separated from the wheelie control, meaning both systems can be controlled independently. The dashboard now has a three-position ‘W’ setting, alongside the Power, Engine Braking and Honda Selectable Torque Control (HSTC) traction settings. The ABS settings has also been tweaked, giving less intervention above 120 km/h (75 mph) and giving 15% more deceleration. The ride-by-wire throttle motor is also enhanced, giving the throttle plates more quick reaction to the rider's inputs.

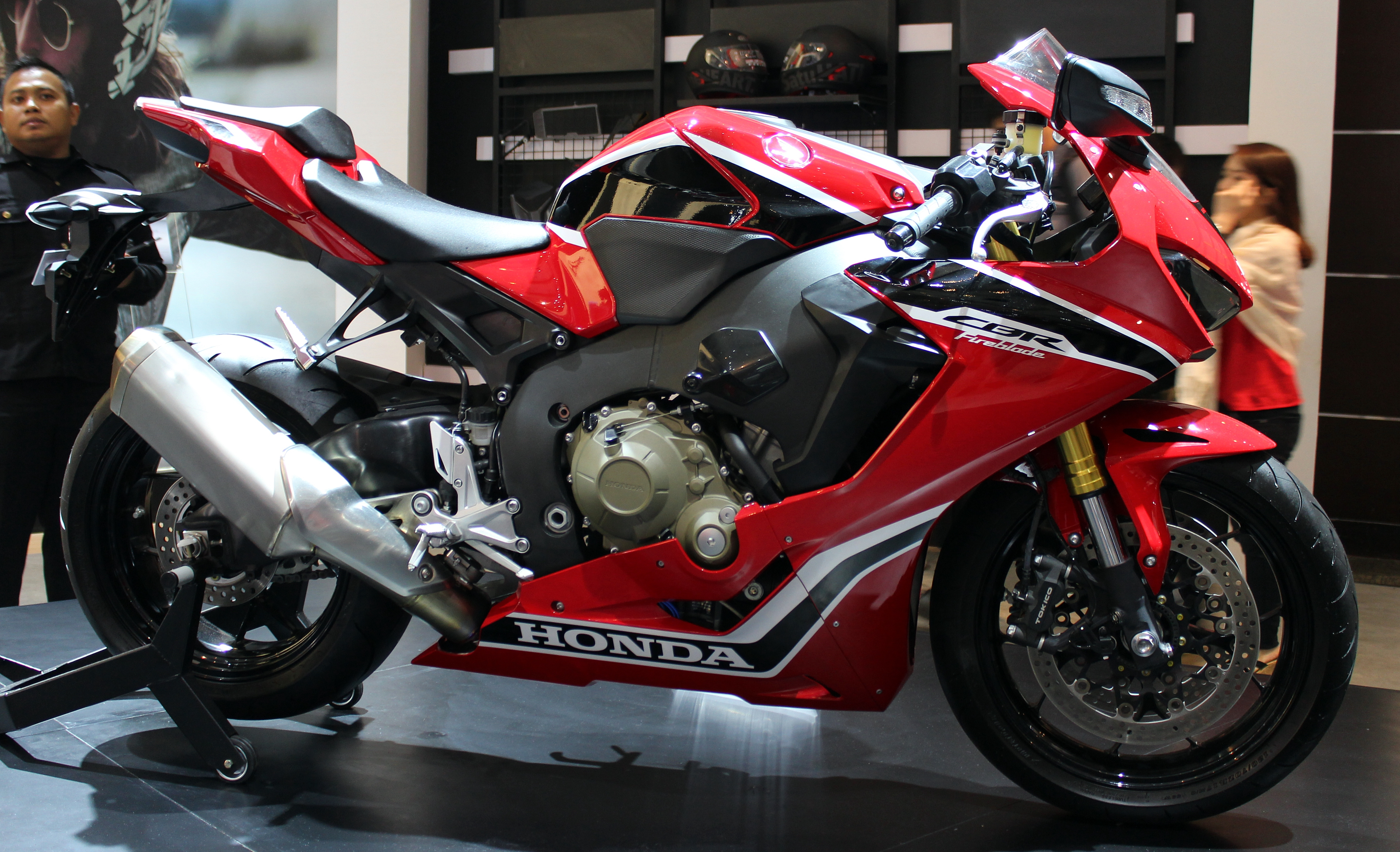
2017 CBR1000RR

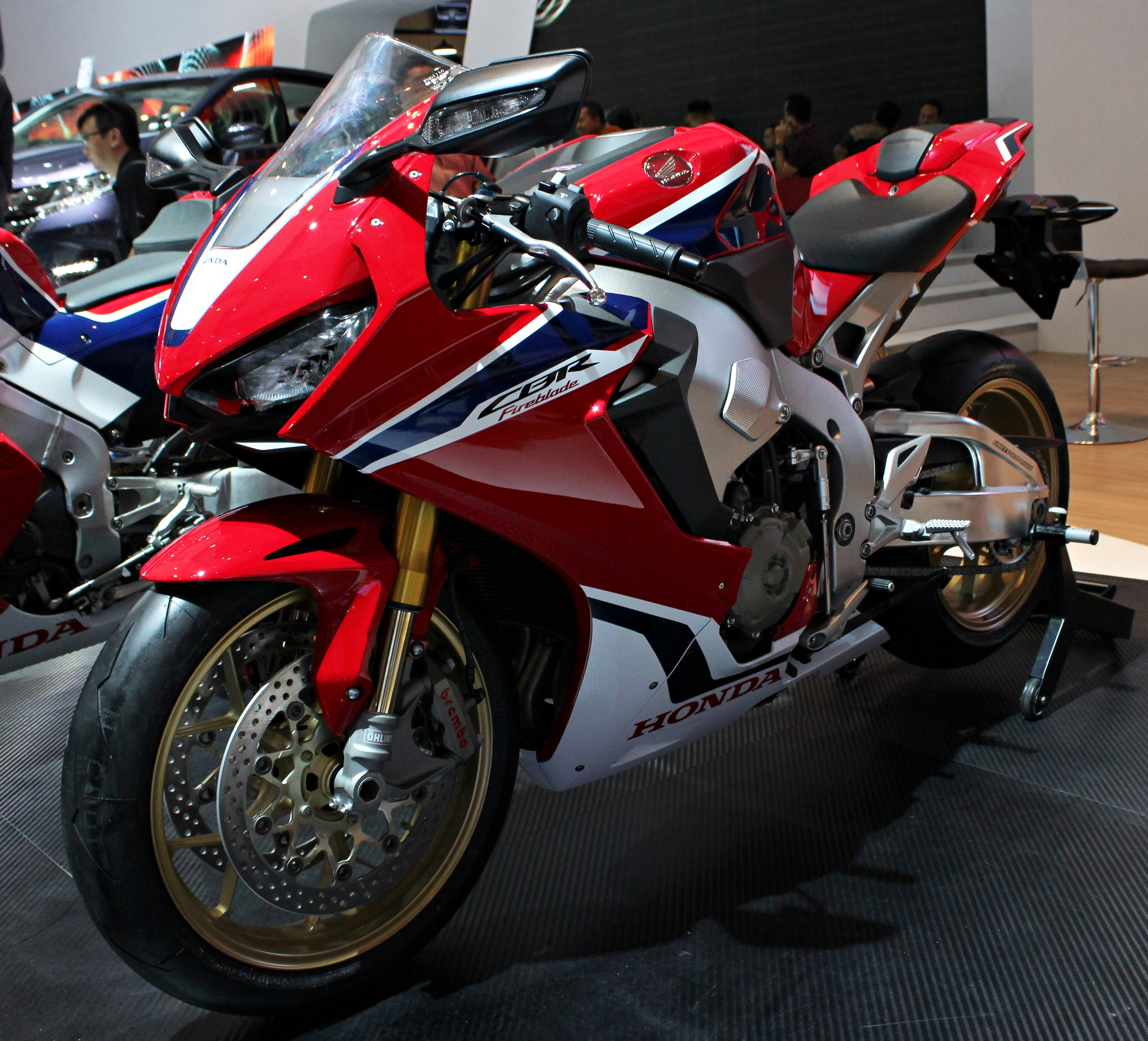
2018 CBR1000RR SP1

=== 2020–present (CBR1000RR-R; SC82) ===
For 2020, the CBR1000RR is updated along with an updated name (CBR1000RR-R) for the SP model which is race inspired, with redesigned bodywork and new engine based on technologies used in RC213V MotoGP bike.

==== 2024 ====
Changes to the 2024 model include improved specifications for each engine part that have resulted in improved acceleration performance in the mid-range, the implementation of Honda's first two-motor throttle-by-wire (TBW) system, and weight reduction through redesigned frame body components.

==== 2027 ====
For the 2027 model, the newly designed aluminum twin-tube frame features an enlarged opening in the head pipe that introduces fresh air to the air cleaner, optimizing lateral rigidity. The hanger supporting the engine cylinder has been changed from a conventional cast, one-piece structure with stiffeners to a bolt-on configuration using separate stays, which increases the flexibility of the frame shape. Through revisions to various parts, torsional rigidity has been maintained while lateral rigidity has been reduced by 20 percent compared to the 2024 model. Using the thin-walled GDC (gravity die casting) manufacturing method, which allows for high-precision rigidity tuning, the frame's wall thickness has been reduced to 2 mm (0.079 in) at its thinnest point, and each part has been molded to the optimal thickness, resulting in a weight reduction of 440 g (0.97 lb) compared to the 2024 model. The aluminum press-formed swingarm has also been newly designed, changing the pivot shaft diameter from the conventional 20 to 17 mm (0.79 to 0.67 in), and optimizing rigidity by adjusting the wall thickness and pivot width. By reducing lateral rigidity by 12 percent while maintaining torsional rigidity, Honda claimed the rear tire's grip during cornering has been improved.

The engine is updated to include a two-stage variable air funnel, a first for Honda's mass-produced motorcycles. This mechanism utilizes a two-stage air funnel structure that splits into upper and lower sections, varying the length and diameter of the intake port according to engine speed. Above 11,750 rpm, the air funnel slides upward and splits, maintaining high-speed output while improving low-to-mid-speed output, which contributes to overall ease of handling.

The throttle valve distribution control using the conventionally employed two-motor throttle-by-wire system has been improved with enhanced electronic control precision, enabling finer opening and closing. This enhances control performance during acceleration and engine braking performance during deceleration, while also achieving a smoother transition from deceleration to acceleration, which improves drivability.

The cylinder head cover have been changed from aluminum to magnesium, resulting in a weight reduction of over 200 g (0.44 lb) in the SP model.

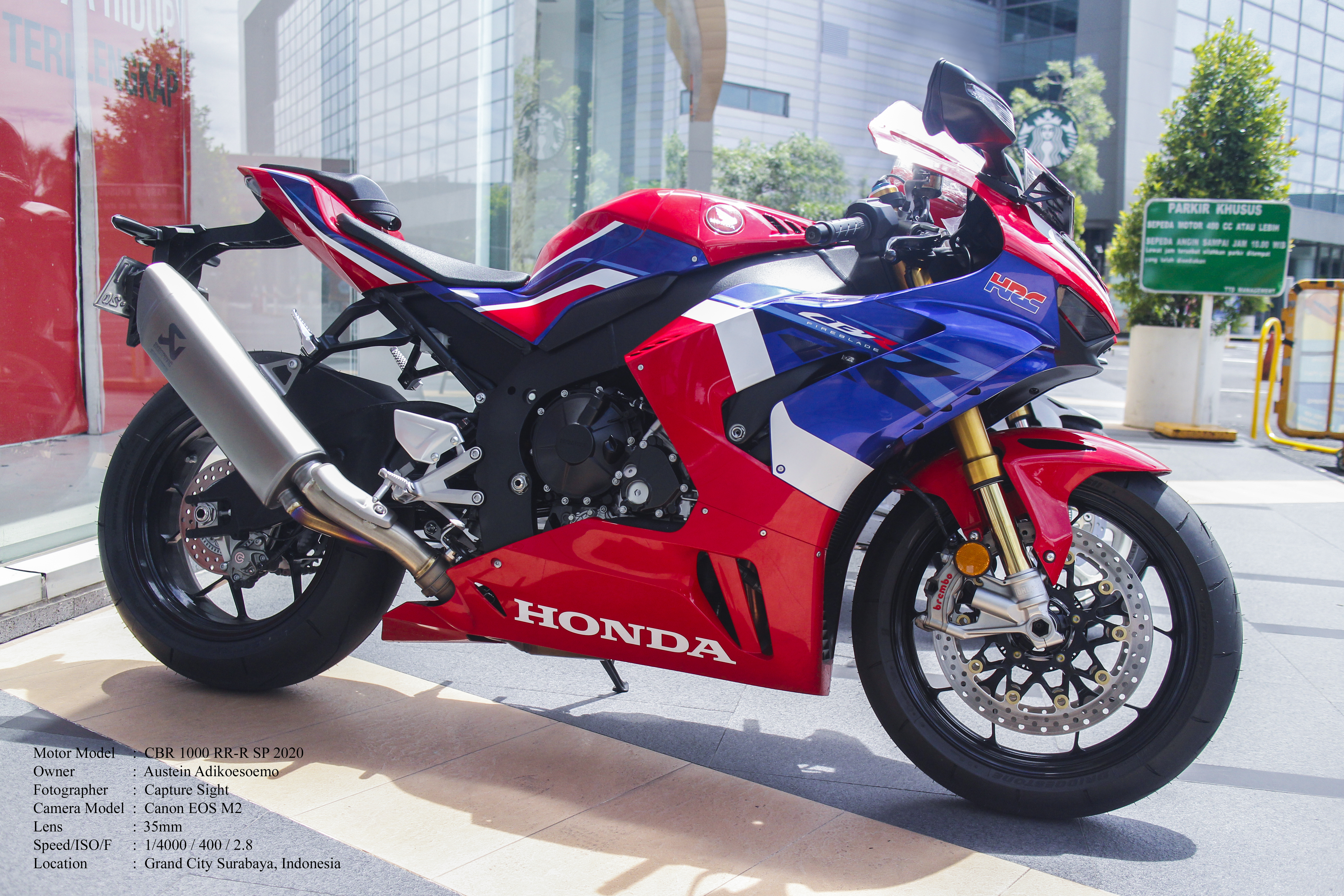
2020 CBR1000RR-R Fireblade SP

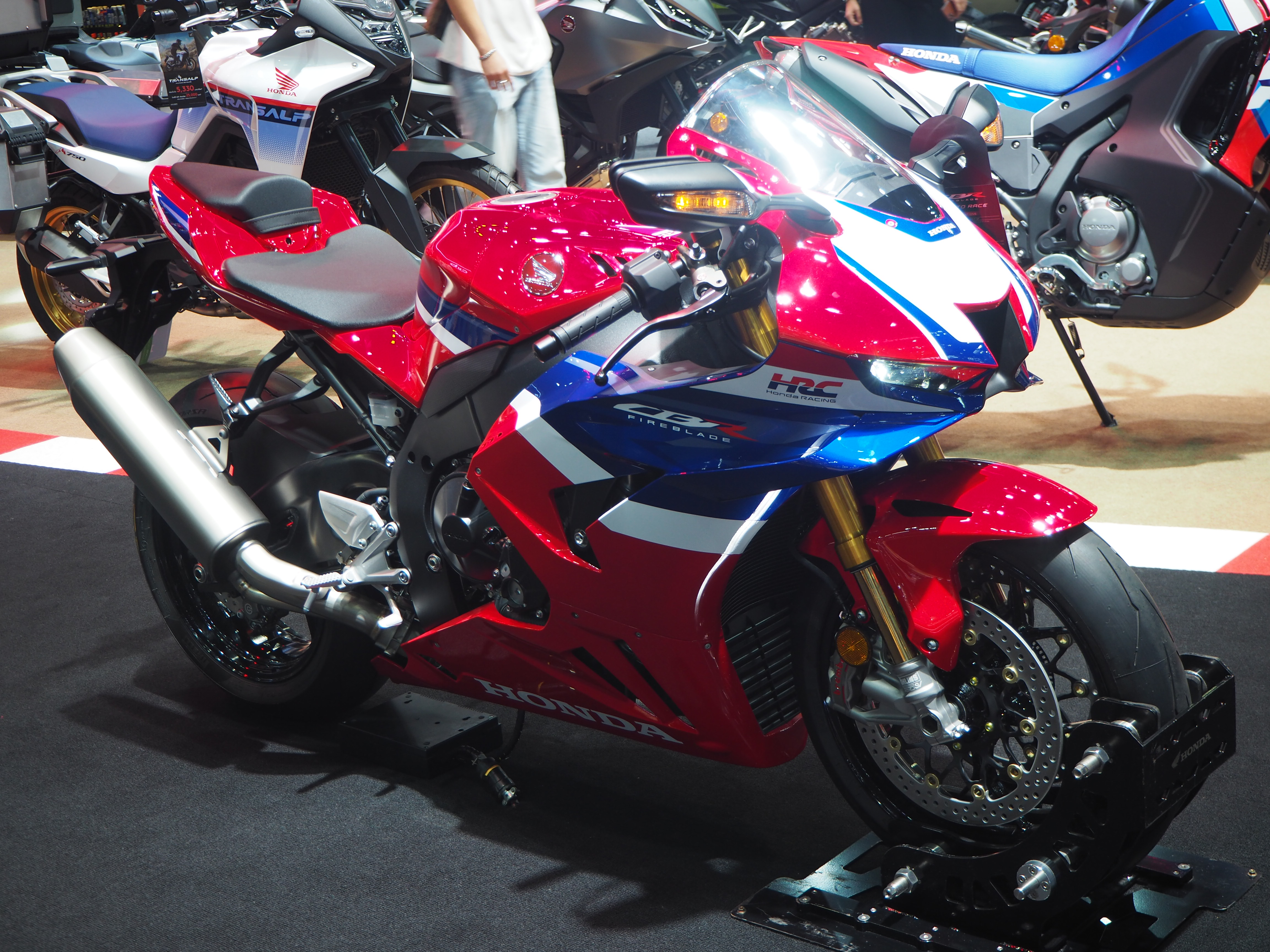
2024 CBR1000RR-R Fireblade SP

2027 CBR1000RR-R Fireblade SP

== Awards ==
The CBR1000RR was awarded Cycle World's International Bike of the Year for 2008–09 by the world's moto-journal communities as well as journalists. The 2009 CBR1000RR won the Best Sportbike of the Year Award in Motorcycle USA Best of 2009 Awards, having also won the over 750 cc open sportbike class in 2008. The 2012 CBR1000RR won another Cycle World shootout, as well as a Motorcycle USA best street and track comparisons.

Various teams have won the Suzuka 8 Hours endurance race nine times between 2003 and 2014. Various teams have won the Macau Grand Prix five times between 2004 and 2012.

== Specifications ==
	2004 — 2005	2006 — 2007	2008 — 2011	2012 — 2016	2017 — 2019	2020
Engine	998 cc (60.9 cu in) liquid-cooled inline four-cylinder		999 cc (61.0 cu in) liquid-cooled inline four-cylinder			
Bore × stroke	75.0 mm × 56.5 mm (2.95 in × 2.22 in)		76 mm × 55.1 mm (2.99 in × 2.17 in)			81 mm x 48.5 mm (3.18 in x 1.90 in)
Compression ratio	11.9:1	12.2:1	12.3:1		13.0:1	13.0:1
Valvetrain	Four valves per cylinder (DOHC)					
Fuel	Dual Stage Fuel Injection (DSFI)					
Ignition	Computer-controlled digital transistorized with 3D mapping					
Power	128.3 kW (172.0 bhp) @ 11,000 rpm	129.8 kW (174.0 bhp) @ 11,250 rpm	138.7 kW (186.0 bhp) @ 12,000 rpm			160 kW (214 bhp) @ 14,500 (claimed, Euro model) 144 kW (193 bhp) @ 13,960 measured 139 kW (186 bhp) @ 12,000 rpm (claimed, US model)
Power rear wheel	101.5 kW (136.1 hp)	106.3 kW (142.6 hp)	112.5 kW (150.9 hp)		114.2 kW (153.2 hp) @ 10,600 rpm	123.3 kW (165.4 bhp) @ 12,000 rpm (US model)
Torque	103.6 N⋅m (76.4 lbf⋅ft) @ 8,500 rpm	104.05 N⋅m (76.74 lb⋅ft) @ 8500 rpm	102.6 N⋅m (75.7 lbf⋅ft) (rear wheel)	106.2 N⋅m (78.3 lb⋅ft) @ 9,630 rpm	114 N⋅m (84 lb⋅ft) @ 11,000 rpm	
Torque rear wheel	96.8 N⋅m (71.4 lbf⋅ft)	100.2 N⋅m (73.9 lbf⋅ft)	102.6 N⋅m (75.7 lbf⋅ft)			101.1 N⋅m (74.6 lbf⋅ft) @ 10,580 rpm
Top Speed	290 km/h (180 mph)	303 km/h (188 mph)	304 km/h (189 mph)	280 km/h (174 mph)	304 km/h (189 mph)	
Drivetrain	Cassette-type, close-ratio six-speed sequential, constant-mesh, #530 O-ring sealed chain		Close-ratio six-speed sequential, constant-mesh, #530 O-ring sealed chain			6-speed sequential, multi-plate hydraulic wet-clutch with assist-slipper
Front suspension	43 mm (1.7 in) inverted HMAS cartridge fork with spring-preload, rebound and compression-damping adjustability; 120 mm (4.7 in) travel			43 mm (1.7 in) inverted Big Piston Fork with spring preload, rebound and compression damping adjustability	43 mm (1.7 in) inverted Big Piston Fork fully adjustable 120 mm (4.7 in) travel	43 mm (1.7 in) Showa Telescopic inverted piston fork fully adjustable 120 mm (4.7 in) travel
Rear suspension	HMAS Pro-Link single shock with spring-preload, rebound and compression-damping adjustability; 130 mm (5.3 in) travel		Unit Pro-Link HMAS single shock with spring pre-load, rebound and compression damping adjustability; 140 mm (5.4 in) travel	Unit Pro-Link Balance-Free Rear Shock with spring pre-load, rebound and compression damping adjustability	Showa balance-free shock fully adjustable l140 mm (5.4 in) travel	Unit Pro-Link with gas-charged HMAS damper featuring 10-step preload
Brakes	Front: Dual full-floating 310 mm (12 in) discs with four-piston radial-mounted callipers Rear: Single 220 mm (8.7 in) disc with single-piston calliper	Front: Dual full-floating 320 mm (13 in) discs with four-piston radial-mounted callipers Rear: Single 220 mm (8.7 in) disc with single-piston calliper				Cast aluminum alloy 5-spoke; 17 in. x 3.5 in. / 17 in. x 6 in.
Tires	Front: 120/70ZR-17 radial Rear: 190/50ZR-17 radial					Front: 120/70-ZR17 radial Rear: 200/55-ZR17 radial
Rake, trail	23.75°, 102 mm (4.0 in)	23.45°, 100 mm (3.9 in)	23.3°, 96.2 mm (3.79 in)	23.3°, 96.0 mm (3.78 in)	23.3°, 96.0 mm (3.78 in)	24.0°, 101.6 mm (4.00 in)
Wheelbase	1,410 mm (55.6 in)	1,400 mm (55.2 in)	1,410 mm (55.4 in)	1,410 mm (55.5 in)	1,400 mm (55.3 in)	1,455 mm (57.3 in)
Seat height	830 mm (32.5 in)	820 mm (32.3 in)			830 mm (32.7 in)	828 mm (32.6 in)
Dry weight	195 kg (431 lb)	193 kg (425 lb)	175 kg (385 lb)			
Wet weight	208–210 kg (459–463 lb)	204 kg (449 lb)	199 kg (438 lb)	205 kg (452 lb)	196 kg (433 lb)	
Fuel capacity	18 L; 4.0 imp gal (4.8 US gal), including 4.0 L; 0.88 imp gal (1.06 US gal) reserve		18 L; 3.9 imp gal (4.7 US gal), including 4.0 L; 0.88 imp gal (1.06 US gal) reserve		16 L; 3.5 imp gal (4.2 US gal)	16 L (3.5 imp gal; 4.2 US gal)
Performance
0 to 60 mph (0 to 97 km/h)	2.7–3.19 sec.	2.79–3.00 sec.	2.95 sec.	2.6 sec.		
0 to 1/4 mi (0.00 to 0.40 km)	10.14 sec. @ 226.58 km/h (140.79 mph)	9.95 sec. @ 232.4 km/h (144.4 mph)	9.94 sec. @ 230.33 km/h (143.12 mph)	9.82 sec. @ 232.98 km/h (144.77 mph)		
Top speed	288–290 km/h (179–180 mph)	301–303 km/h (187–188 mph)	311 km/h (193 mph)	309 km/h (192 mph)	344 km/h (214 mph)	
Braking 60 to 0 mph (97 to 0 km/h)	35 m (114 ft)	35 m (115 ft)	37 m (122 ft)	37 m (123 ft)		
Fuel economy	6.36 L/100 km; 44.4 mpg_{‑imp} (37.0 mpg_{‑US})	6.24 L/100 km; 45.3 mpg_{‑imp} (37.7 mpg_{‑US})	6.11 L/100 km; 46.2 mpg_{‑imp} (38.5 mpg_{‑US})	6.2 L/100 km; 46 mpg_{‑imp} (38 mpg_{‑US})		

== See also ==
- List of fastest production motorcycles by acceleration
- Honda CBR150R
- Honda CBR300R
- Honda CBR600RR
- Honda CBR900RR
