= Honda CBF500 =

CBF500
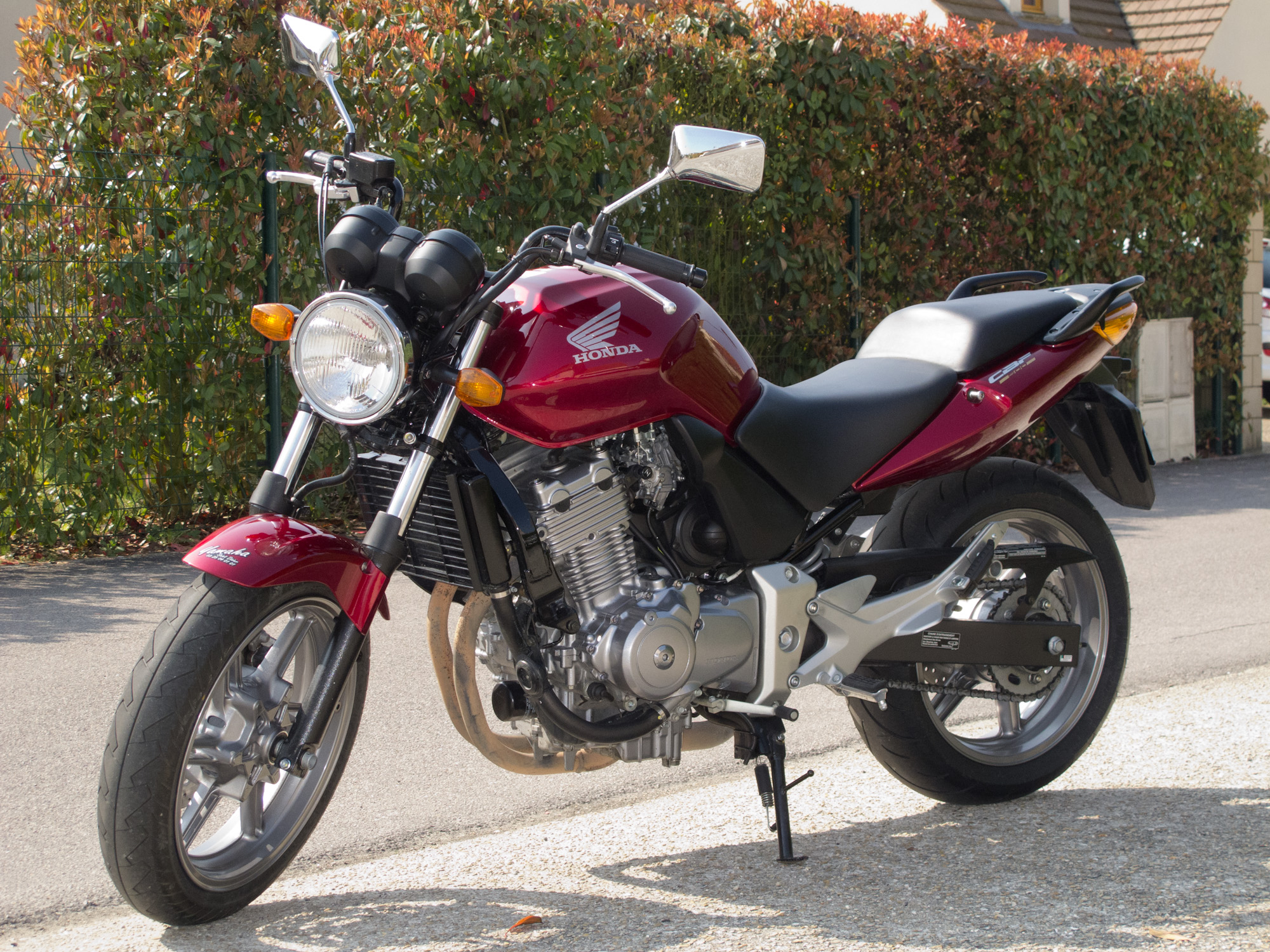
- Manufacturer: Honda
- Predecessor: CB500
- Class: Naked bike
- Engine: 499 cc (30.5 cu in), parallel twin, liquid-cooled, 4-stroke, DOHC, 8-valve
- Power: 56 hp (42 kW)
- Torque: 33 lb⋅ft (45 N⋅m)
- Ignition type: Computer controlled digital transistorised
- Transmission: 6-speed, manual, chain final drive
- Tires: Front: 120/70; Rear: 160/60
- Rake, trail: 26deg
- Wheelbase: 1,480 mm (58 in)
- Dimensions: L: 2,170 mm (85 in); W: 765 mm (30.1 in); H: 1,110 mm (44 in)
- Seat height: 770 mm (30 in)
- Weight: 183 kg (403 lb) (dry); 206 kg (454 lb) (wet)
- Fuel capacity: 19 L (4.2 imp gal; 5.0 US gal)

The Honda CBF500 is a standard motorcycle made by Honda between 2004 and 2007. It is the Euro-2 compliant replacement of the Honda CB500. It has a 56 hp (42 kW), 499 cc parallel twin, and a top speed of 125 mph (201 km/h). It was discontinued after 2007 as new Euro-3 standards become mandatory in EU, the natural replacement is the bigger inline-four 600 cc powered Honda CBF600.

The CBF500 uses the same engine, transmission and final drive as the earlier CB models, but engine is a stressed member of the frame. It has updated fuel and emissions systems, and new instruments, bodywork and suspension. Unlike the CB, the CBF was only available as a naked bike without the half-fairing of the previous CB500S version.

ABS and non-ABS versions were produced, the ABS versions carrying the designation CBF500A. Model designations were:

- CBF500 4 - Non-ABS, 2004 to 2005.
- CBF500A 4 - ABS, 2004 to 2005.
- CBF500 6 - Non-ABS, 2006 to 2007.
- CBF500A 6 - ABS, 2006 to 2008.

== CB500F 2013- ==
For model year 2013, Honda introduced a new global family of CB500 motorcycles. This family includes a naked model called the CB500F. It has a displacement of 471 cc, and is an entirely new design.
