= Honda CBF250 =

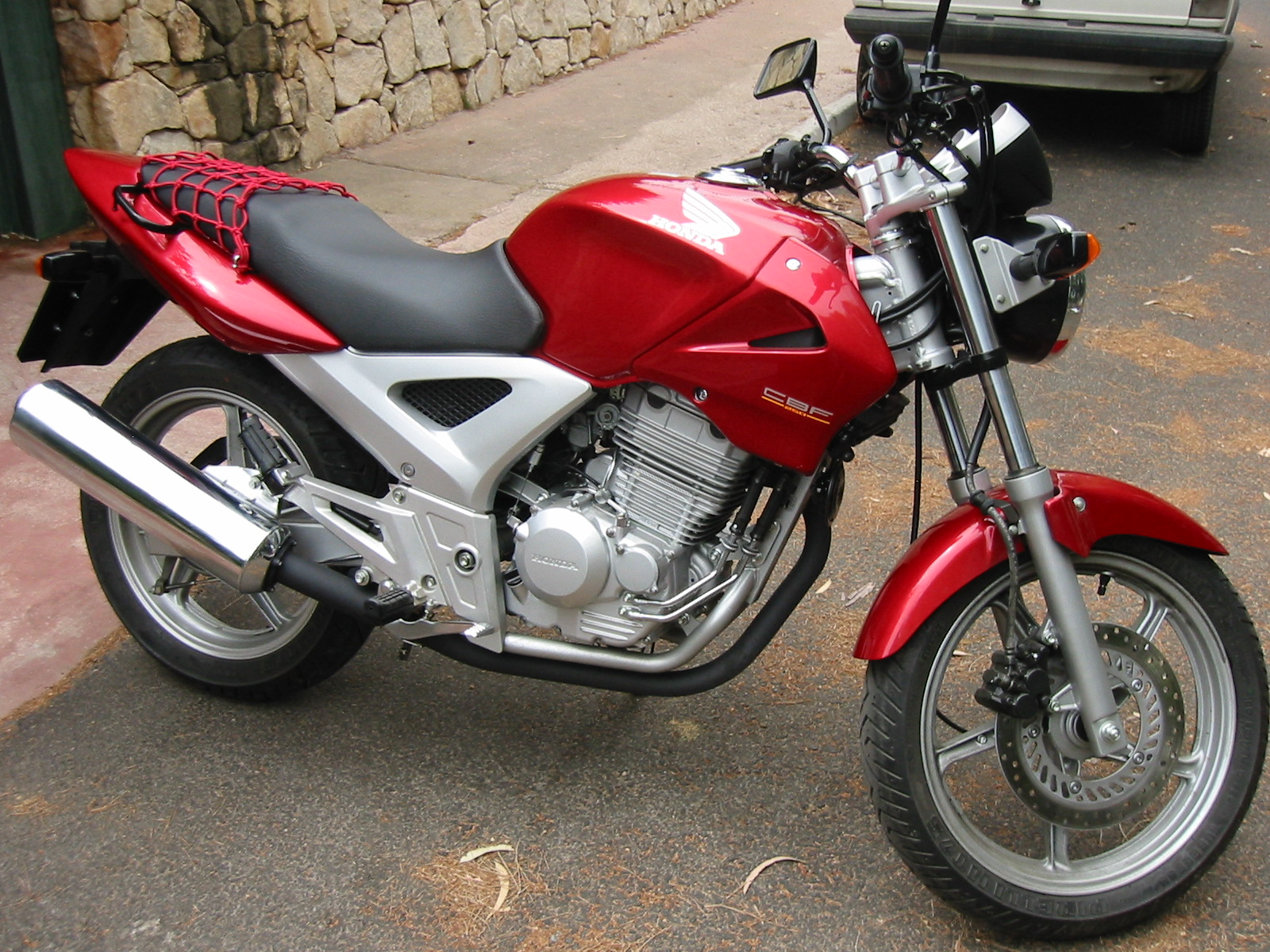
- Manufacturer: Honda
- Production: 2004–2012
- Class: Standard
- Engine: 249.7 cc (15.24 cu in) air-cooled 4-stroke 4-valve DOHC single
- Bore / stroke: 73.0 mm × 59.5 mm (2.9 in × 2.3 in)
- Compression ratio: 9.3:1
- Transmission: 6-speed chain drive manual
- Suspension: Front: 37 mm (1.5 in) telescopic fork Rear: swingarm with monoshock
- Brakes: Front: Dual-piston caliper with single 276 mm (10.9 in) disc Rear: 130 mm (5.1 in) drum
- Tires: Front: 100/80-17; Rear: 130/70-17
- Wheelbase: 1,370 mm (53.9 in)
- Seat height: 780 mm (30.7 in)
- Weight: 138.5 kg (305 lb) (dry)
- Fuel capacity: 16 L (3.5 imp gal; 4.2 US gal)

The Honda CBF250 is a standard motorcycle, part of the CBF series produced by Honda. It is powered by a 249 cc (15.2 cu in) naturally aspirated carburetor single-cylinder engine.
