= Paris Motorcycle Show =

Motorcycle trade show in Paris, France

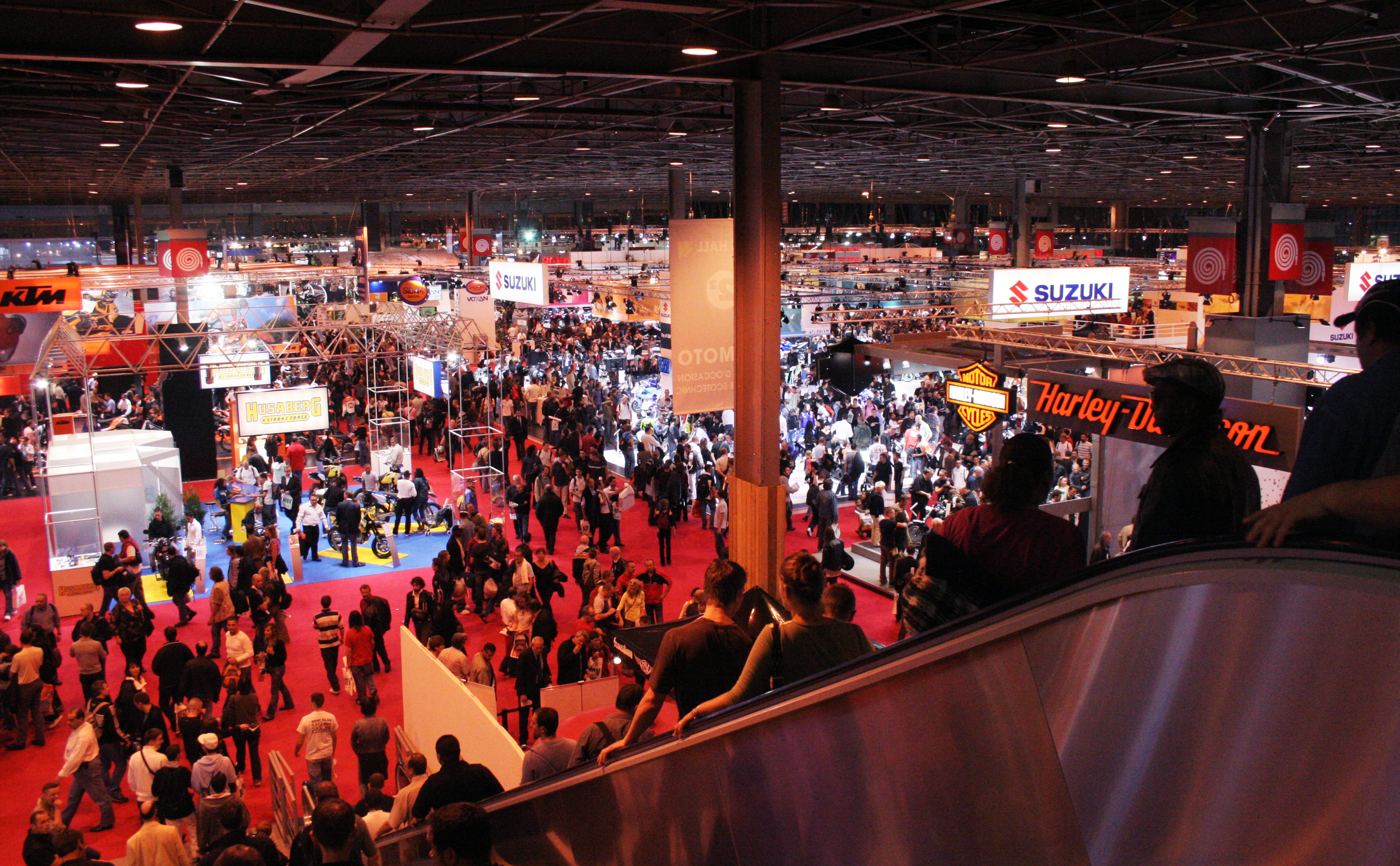
- Entrance to the 2007 Mondial du Deux Roues at Paris Expo Porte de Versailles
- Genre: Trade fair
- Venue: Paris Expo Porte de Versailles
- Location: Paris
- Country: France

The Paris Motorcycle Show is an English-language name used for a succession of public motorcycle trade shows held in Paris, France. The events have been held under several French names, including the Salon du cycle et du motocycle, Salon international de la moto et du cyclomoteur, Mondial du Deux Roues, Salon de la moto, du scooter et du quad, and Mondial de la Moto. Most editions took place at Paris Expo Porte de Versailles and presented motorcycles, scooters, bicycles or other powered two-wheelers, equipment, and new vehicle models.

Motorcycles were displayed alongside other vehicle sectors in earlier Paris exhibitions, but the motorcycle show was held separately from the automobile show from the late 1980s. The two formats were reunited in 2018, when the Mondial de la Moto became part of the combined Mondial Paris Motor Show. A planned 2020 edition was cancelled during the COVID-19 pandemic in France, and French industry press described the Paris motorcycle show as dormant in 2022.

The series should not be confused with the separate Paris Moto Show, a competing event held at the Le Bourget exhibition centre in February 2006.

== History ==
=== Earlier Paris shows ===
Motorcycles were part of Paris vehicle exhibitions before the development of a distinct modern motorcycle-show identity. In October 1968, a biennial Salon de la moto was held at Porte de Versailles alongside bicycle and industrial-vehicle displays. Contemporary coverage described a relatively small motorcycle presence, with seven notable stands from Japanese and European manufacturers. The 1979 Salon du cycle et du motocycle, described as the 66th edition, ran from 28 September to 7 October at the same venue.

By 1989, the Salon international de la moto et du cyclomoteur was taking place independently of the automobile show for the third time. That edition ran from 24 November to 3 December and included a road-safety campaign as well as new motorcycles and scooters. The name Mondial du Deux Roues was in use by 1993.

=== Mondial du Deux Roues ===
The Mondial du Deux Roues combined motorcycle and bicycle exhibitions while retaining separate schedules for parts of the programme. In 2001, organisers recorded 400,495 visitors and 927 represented brands from 31 countries. In 2003, the international bicycle show ran from 26 to 29 September, while the international motorcycle show continued until 5 October.

The 2005 event opened on 1 October and was identified in English-language motorcycle media as both the Paris Motorcycle Show and the Mondial du Deux Roues. The rival Paris Moto Show was held at Le Bourget in February 2006. It occupied 20,000 m^{2} (220,000 sq ft) and included motorcycles, scooters and related products.

The 2007 Mondial du Deux Roues returned to Porte de Versailles with 1,028 exhibiting companies across 409,000 sq ft (38,000 m^{2}). Its programme included bicycle displays, riding lessons, a historical exhibition on motorcycles in film, a used-motorcycle market, public discussions and new-model launches.

=== Cancellation and relaunch, 2009–2015 ===
The 2009 edition was cancelled after major manufacturers withdrew during the global economic downturn. BMW redirected its exhibition budget towards its dealer network, while Honda cited the effects of the crisis; Suzuki and Yamaha also withdrew.

The show returned in 2011 after four years without a Paris edition. Recast as a five-day exhibition for motorcycles, scooters and quad bikes, it attracted 183,026 visitors. The following edition was scheduled for 2013, maintaining a biennial cycle.

The 2013 Salon de la moto, du scooter et du quad occupied halls 5, 6 and 8 at Porte de Versailles. More than 420 brands were represented, and the programme included electric-scooter and children's riding tracks, stunt and freestyle demonstrations, and a historical display devoted to French riders and their motorcycles. The exhibition drew more than 180,000 visitors over six days, used 35,000 m^{2} (380,000 sq ft) of floor space and accredited 1,200 journalists from 21 countries.

AMC Promotion organised the 2011, 2013 and 2015 editions on a biennial basis. The show competed for manufacturers and launches with EICMA in Milan and Intermot in Cologne. The 2015 edition attracted more than 165,000 visitors, about eight per cent fewer than in 2013, and the organiser counted more than 100 national and international premieres. It took place after the November 2015 Paris attacks and during transport restrictions associated with the COP21 conference; Peugeot and the Piaggio group were among the absent exhibitors.

=== Combined Paris Motor Show format ===
No motorcycle show was held in Paris in 2017. Industry representatives considered moving a 2018 edition to Le Bourget or combining motorcycles with the automobile show at Porte de Versailles. The combined option was adopted. The Mondial de la Moto was held within the 2018 Paris Motor Show, with public opening from 4 to 14 October and dedicated motorcycle space in the exhibition complex.

AMC Promotion gave a total attendance of 1,068,194 for the combined automobile-and-motorcycle event. Entrance counters recorded between 390,000 and 395,000 visits to the motorcycle hall. This was the first joint format since the separation of the motorcycle and automobile shows in 1986.

A further combined edition was scheduled for October 2020, but AMC Promotion cancelled the indoor show six months beforehand because of the COVID-19 pandemic and its economic effects on exhibitors. By March 2022, trade publication L'Officiel du Cycle described the Paris Mondial du Deux Roues as dormant.

== Attendance ==
The published attendance figures are not directly comparable because the duration, exhibition area and scope changed between editions. The 2001 figure covered the combined two-wheel show, while the 2018 motorcycle-hall count formed part of a joint automobile-and-motorcycle event.

| Year | Attendance figure | Context |
|---|---|---|
| 2001 | 400,495 | Mondial du Deux Roues |
| 2011 | 183,026 | Five-day relaunched motorcycle, scooter and quad-bike show |
| 2013 | More than 180,000 | Six-day show |
| 2015 | More than 165,000 | Six-day show |
| 2018 | 390,000–395,000 motorcycle-hall visits | Part of the combined Mondial Paris Motor Show |

== See also ==
- EICMA
- Intermot
- Paris Motor Show
