= Honda CB500 twin =

Honda CB500
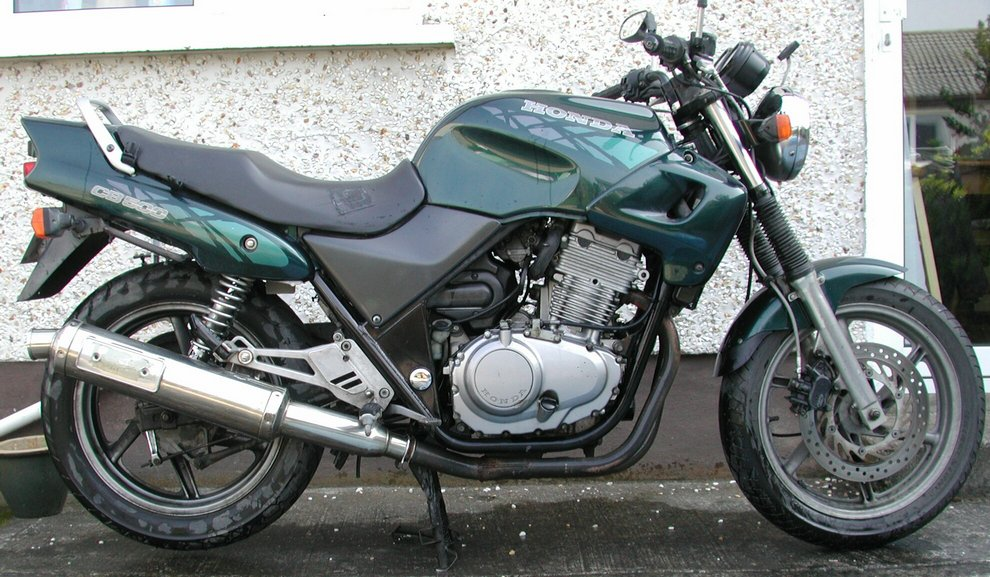
- Manufacturer: Honda
- Successor: CBF500
- Class: Standard
- Engine: 498.06 cc (30.393 cu in) 2-cylinder four-stroke in - line engine, DOHC
- Bore / stroke: 73 mm × 59.5 mm (2.87 in × 2.34 in)
- Compression ratio: 10.5 : 1
- Top speed: 193 km/h
- Power: 42.5 kW (57 hp) at 9500 rpm
- Torque: 47 Nm at 8000 rpm
- Ignition type: contactless digital
- Transmission: 6-speed Gear ratios: Sprocket / Sprocket: 15/40 teeth Primary: 1,947; Secondary: 2,666; 1st gear: 3,461; 2nd gear: 2,235; 3rd gear: 1,750; 4th gear: 1,478; 5th gear: 1,280; 6th gear: 1,130
- Brakes: Front: single disc brake Ø 296 mm with double piston caliper from Nissin (PC 26 + PC 32 (1996); Or; Brembo (PC 32, from model year 1997); Rear: drum brake Ø 160 mm (PC 26 + PC 32 (1996); Or; Single disc brake Ø 240 mm (PC 32, from model year 1997)
- Tires: Front: 110/80-17 57H; Rear: 130/80-17 65H
- Wheelbase: 1430 mm
- Dimensions: L: 2170 mm W: 720 mm H: 1050 mm
- Seat height: 77.5
- Weight: 170 kg (dry)
- Fuel capacity: (with reserve) = 18 L (reserve tank) = 2.5 L
- Fuel consumption: 5.8 L/100 km or 17.2 km/L
- Range: 315 km
- Footnotes / references Haynes Honda CB500 Service and Repair Manual by Phil Mather

Honda CB500 twins were a family of medium-sized standard motorcycles produced by Honda from 1993 until 2003. Because of their low cost, reliability, and good handling they were popular with commuters, and Motorcycle couriers. They were also raced in the United Kingdom in the Honda CB500 Cup (changed its name in 2009 to the Thundersport 500 when Suzuki GS500 and Kawasaki ER-5 were included).

The half-faired Honda CB500S was introduced in 1998. Production of the first CB500 twin range ceased in 2003 as the engines could not meet Euro 2 emission regulations.

According to Honda engineers, the 499 cc parallel twin DOHC engine was designed to last for 300,000 km (190,000 miles). One motorcycle was tested by Moto Revue from 1993 through 1996. Dismantled at 50,000 km (31,000 miles), the engine was in perfect condition. At 100,000 km (62,000 miles) only the cam chain and the pistons were replaced, although, in the tester's opinion, it could have run with the original parts for longer with no problems.

== Model history ==
1994: CB500R naked version launched. Rear drum brake. Nissin front disk brake. Made in Japan.

1995: No change

1996: CB500T. No significant changes. Some CB500Ts made in Italy.

1996, November: CB500V. Brakes changed to Brembo. Rear drum brake changed to disk. Silver wheels. CB500 Cup race series introduced. Special silver model with cup logo introduced. Production moved to Italy.

1998: CB500W naked version. CB500SW 'sport' half-faired version with new headlight introduced. New instruments and handlebar layout.

1998, December: CB500X, CB500SX. No technical changes.

2000 through 2003: CB500Y, CB500SY. No technical changes.

== Specification (CB500Y 2003) ==
Engine type	8v parallel twin, 180-degree crankshaft
Engine cooling	Liquid
Number of cylinders	2
Valves per cylinder	4
Valve actuation	Double overhead cam
Cam drive	Chain
Capacity	498.06 cc (30.393 cu in)
Bore x stroke	73 mm × 59.5 mm (2.87 in × 2.34 in)
Compression ratio	10.5:1
Max rpm	10500
Power	57 hp (43 kW)
Torque	35 lb⋅ft (47 N⋅m)
Fueling	2 of 34mm flat-slide Keihin VPs carburetors
Ignition	Digital transistorised
Clutch	Wet multi-plate
Gearbox	6 speed synchromesh
Final drive	Chain
Fuel capacity	18L
Frame	Steel tubular cradle
Suspension	Front: conventional forks, preload. Rear: swinging arm, twin shock absorbers
Tyres	Front: 110/80-17" 57H. Rear: 130/80-17 65H
Brakes	Brembo Front: 296 mm single disk. Rear: 240 mm single disk
Dimensions	Length: 2,090 mm (82 in) Width:720 mm (28 in) Height:1,050 mm (41 in)
Wheelbase	1,430 mm (56 in)
Rake_trail	27°20', 113 mm (4.4 in)
seat_height	775 mm (30.5 in)
Weight (dry)	173 kg (381 lb)
