= Honda CBF600 =

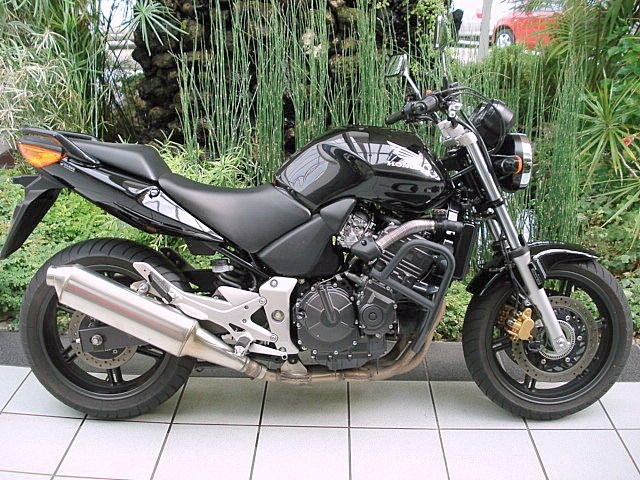
- 2008 Honda CBF600N
- Manufacturer: Honda
- Also called: CBF600 -N, -S, -NA, & -SA
- Production: 2004–2013
- Class: Naked
- Engine: 599 cc (36.6 cu in) liquid-cooled inline-four
- Related: CB600F Hornet

The CBF600 is a middleweight motorcycle made by Honda until 2013. There are 2 models in the family, CBF600N is the 'naked' version and CBF600S is the half faired inspired from Hero Honda Karizma, the differences consisting just in the front fairing and headlamp block

== First generation (2004–2007) - code PC38 ==
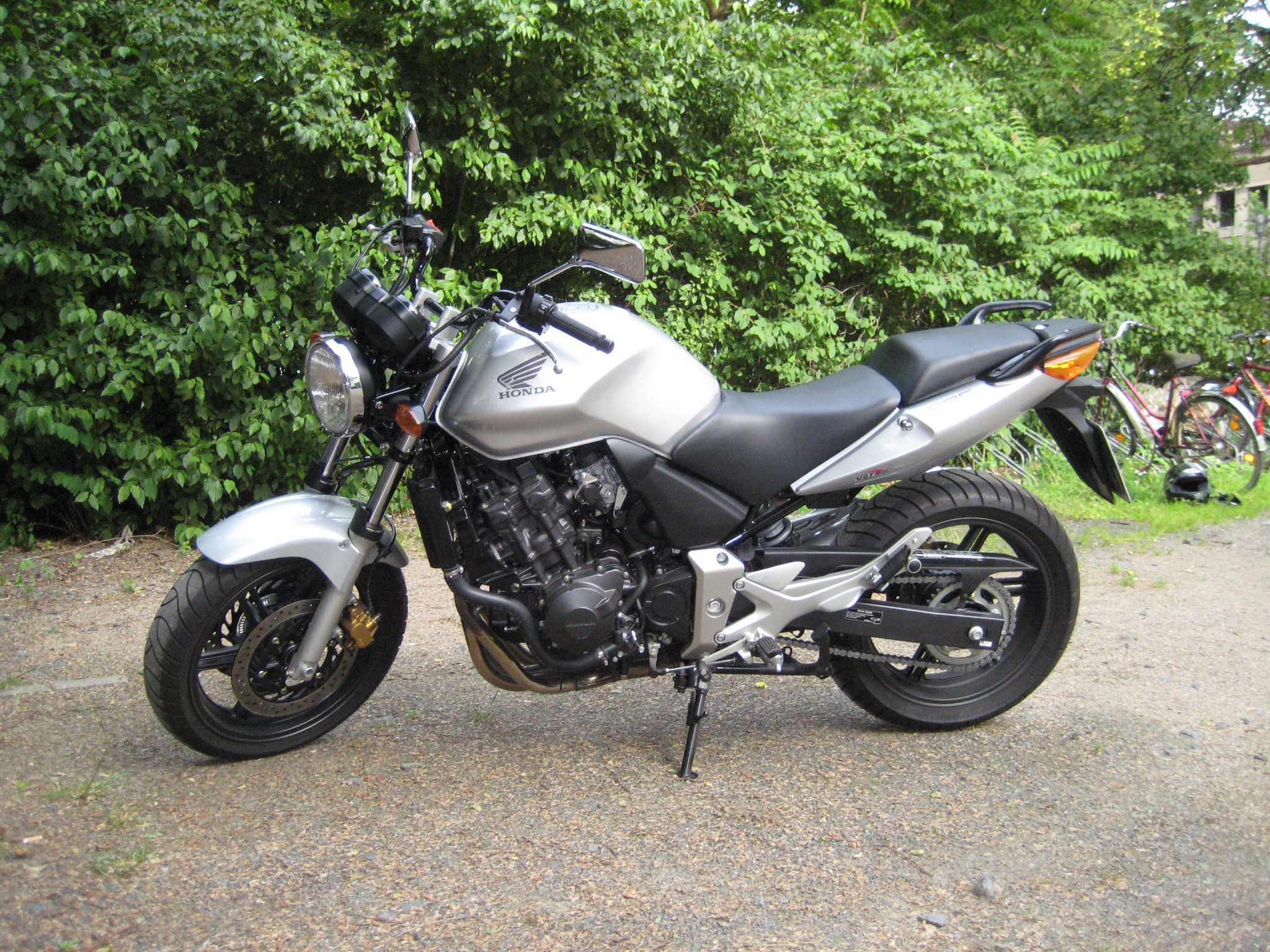
Honda CBF600NA

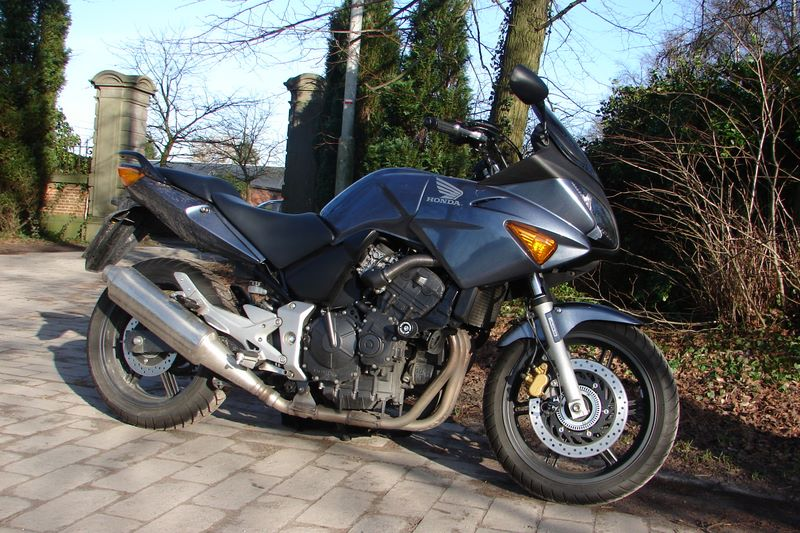
Honda CBF600SA

The older CB500 middleweight motorcycle was not compliant with the European emission standards, so Honda introduced a new design based on existing Hornet engine and gave it a look meant to inspire safety and to appeal returning riders, new riders or women. The EURO2 standards are met, while ABS is optional (factory assembly) on both naked and half-faired models. A centre stand comes standard with the ABS version only. The seat is adjustable with 3 positions, while the windscreen has also 2 positions meeting most riders' demands. The gearbox and the engine are optimised for smooth power delivery. 4 colours were offered for the faired version- black, dolphin grey, pearl red and metallic blue.

== Second generation (2007–2013) - code PC43 ==
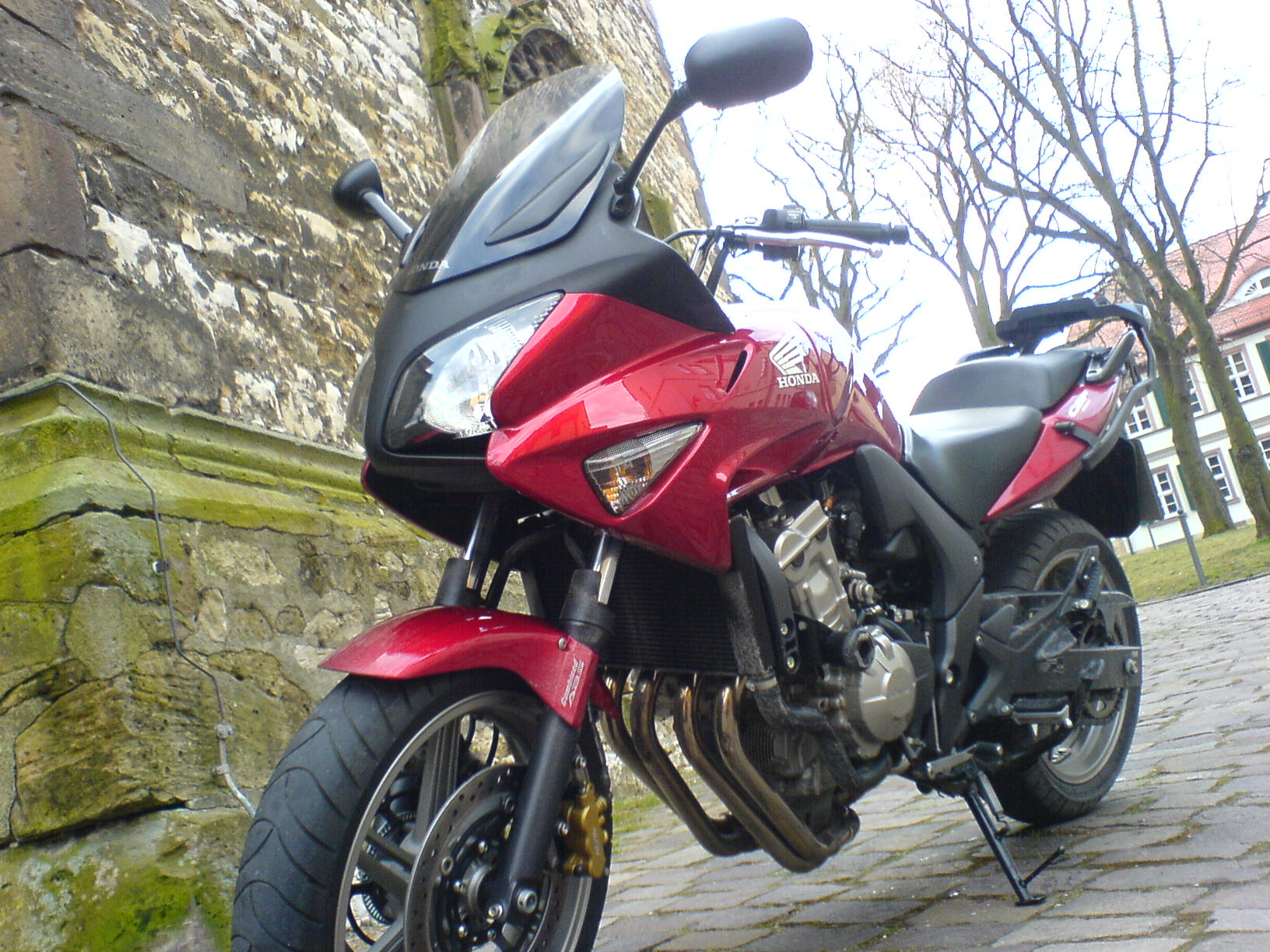
Honda CBF600SA

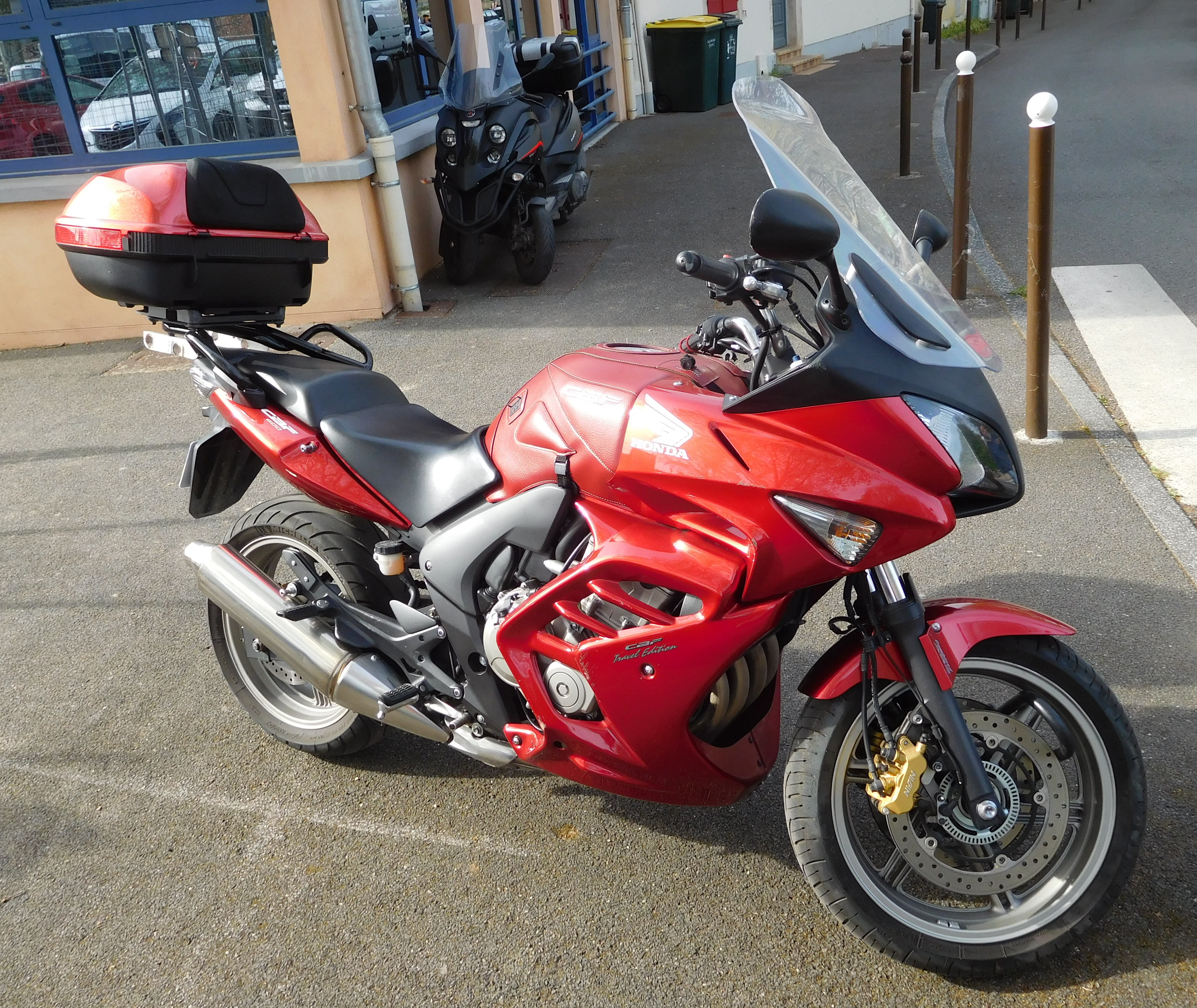
Honda CBF600 Travel Edition

Advancing emission standards are met with the new EURO3 compliant model in 2008. The engine is a detuned CBR600RR 2007 model with fuel injection, improving the mileage from 5-7 litres per 100 km to 4-5 litres per 100 km while keeping the same maximum power output. The fuel tank capacity was increased by one litre, the new chassis is aluminium cast, and the engine colour is now metallic-grey instead of black, and the chassis is now painted black instead of metallic grey. The colour scheme was kept for 2008 and 2009. In 2010, green-red, black-red, white-red and white-blue colour combinations were added for the faired version.

== Specifications ==
Specifications
| | CBF600 PC38 N4, N5, N6 | CBF600 PC43 N8 |
|---|---|---|
| Type | Liquid-cooled 4-stroke 16-valve DOHC inline-4 | |
| Displacement | 599.9cm3 | 599.3cm3 |
| Power | 57 kW (76 hp)/10500rpm | 57 kW (76 hp)/10500rpm |
| Torque | 58 N⋅m (43 lb⋅ft)/8000rpm | 59 N⋅m (44 lb⋅ft)/8250rpm |
| Transmission Type | 6-speed | |
| Carburation | 34mm slanted flat-slide VP-type carburettor x 4 | PGM-FI electronic fuel injection |
| Chassis | Steel tube | Cast aluminium |
| Fuel capacity | 19 litres | 20 litres |
| Seat height | 785 mm (± 15 mm) / 30.9 in | |
| Ground clearance | 130 mm / 5.1 in | |
| Front suspension | 41 mm telescopic fork 120mm axle travel | |
| Front brakes | 2 x 296 mm discs 2 pistons calipers (ABS) | |
| Front tyre | 120/70 ZR17M/C (58W) | |
| Rear suspension | Monoshock damper with 7-step adjustable preload, 125mm axle travel | |
| Rear brakes | Single disc 1 piston caliper (ABS) | |
| Rear tyre | 160/60 ZR17M/C (69W) | |
| Curb weight | 215kg (F:106kg; R:109kg) | 213kg (F:103kg; R:110kg), ABS: 218kg (F:105kg; R:113kg) |

== See also ==
- Honda 650cc standard and sport motorcycles
- Honda CB600F Hornet
