= Ivan Goi =

Italian motorcycle racer

- Nationality: Italian
- Born: 29 February 1980 (age 46); Casalmaggiore, Italy
- Current team: DMR Racing
- Bike number: 12
Motorcycle racing career statistics
125cc World Championship
Active years	1996–2000, 2002
Manufacturers	Honda, Aprilia
Championships	0
2002 championship position	NC (0 pts)
Starts / Wins / Podiums / Poles / F. laps / Points; 75 / 1 / 2 / 0 / 0 / 353
Superbike World Championship
Active years	2006, 2014
Manufacturers	Honda, Ducati
Championships	0
2014 championship position	29th (5 pts)
Starts / Wins / Podiums / Poles / F. laps / Points; 7 / 0 / 0 / 0 / 0 / 5
Supersport World Championship
Active years	2001, 2003, 2005
Manufacturers	Honda, Yamaha
Championships	0
2005 championship position	24th (10 pts)
Starts / Wins / Podiums / Poles / F. laps / Points; 10 / 0 / 0 / 0 / 0 / 18

Ivan Goi (born 29 February 1980) is an Italian motorcycle road racer. He currently competes in the CIV Superbike Championship aboard a BMW S1000RR.

== Racing career ==
Goi competed in the 125cc World Championship from 1996 to 2000 and in 2002; he had his best year in this competition in 1996, when he won the 125cc Austrian Grand Prix, becoming the then youngest rider to win a race in Grands Prix at 16 years and 157 days of age, and finished in tenth place in the final standings, as in 2000. In 2001, he debuted in the Supersport World Championship, where he raced also in 2003 and 2005, and he competed in selected events of the Superbike World Championship in 2006 and 2014.

At the national level, Goi won the CIV Stock 1000 Championship in 2010 and in 2012 and the CIV Superbike Championship in 2014.

== Career statistics ==
=== Grand Prix motorcycle racing ===
==== Races by year ====
(key)

Year	Class	Bike	1	2	3	4	5	6	7	8	9	10	11	12	13	14	15	16	Pos.	Pts
1996	125cc	Honda	MAL; 16	INA; 13	JPN; 19	SPA; 10	ITA; 8	FRA; 12	NED; 2	GER; 10	GBR; 12	AUT; 1	CZE; 9	IMO; 7	CAT; 9	BRA; Ret	AUS; 5		10th	110
1997	125cc	Aprilia	MAL; 13	JPN; 14	SPA; 11	ITA; 13	AUT; 12	FRA; 16	NED; 15	IMO; Ret	GER; 13	BRA; 18	GBR; 17	CZE; Ret	CAT	INA	AUS		18th	21
1998	125cc	Aprilia	JPN; 15	MAL; 15	SPA; Ret	ITA; 13	FRA; 9	MAD; Ret	NED; 14	GBR; 10	GER; 11	CZE; 9	IMO; 10	CAT; 11	AUS; 11	ARG; 11			14th	53
1999	125cc	Honda	MAL; 8	JPN; 14	SPA; 11	FRA; Ret	ITA; 15	CAT; 15	NED; 11	GBR; 11	GER; 12	CZE; 11	IMO; 6	VAL; Ret	AUS; 14	RSA; Ret	BRA; 11	ARG; 8	13th	61
2000	125cc	Honda	RSA; 8	MAL; 10	JPN; 6	SPA; 7	FRA; 6	ITA; 13	CAT; 11	NED; 8	GBR; Ret	GER; 6	CZE; 10	POR; 6	VAL; Ret	BRA; 12	PAC; 5	AUS; 8	10th	108
2002	125cc	Aprilia	JPN	RSA	SPA	FRA	ITA	CAT	NED	GBR; 19	GER; 24	CZE	POR	BRA	PAC	MAL	AUS	VAL	NC	0

=== Supersport World Championship ===
==== Races by year ====
(key)

Year	Bike	1	2	3	4	5	6	7	8	9	10	11	12	Pos.	Pts
2001	Honda	SPA; 23	AUS; 9	JPN; 20	ITA	GBR	GER	SMR	EUR	GER	NED	ITA		25th	7
2003	Yamaha	SPA	AUS	JPN	ITA; 18	GER	GBR	SMR; 15	GBR	NED	ITA; Ret	FRA		36th	1
2005	Yamaha	QAT	AUS	SPA	ITA; 9	EUR	SMR; 16	CZE	GBR	NED	GER	ITA; Ret	FRA; 13	24th	10

=== Superbike World Championship ===
==== Races by year ====
(key)

Year	Make	1		2		3		4		5		6		7		8		9		10		11		12		Pos.	Pts
Year	Make	R1	R2	R1	R2	R1	R2	R1	R2	R1	R2	R1	R2	R1	R2	R1	R2	R1	R2	R1	R2	R1	R2	R1	R2	Pos.	Pts
2006	Honda	QAT	QAT	AUS	AUS	SPA	SPA	ITA	ITA	EUR	EUR	SMR	SMR	CZE	CZE	GBR	GBR	NED	NED	GER	GER	ITA; Ret	ITA; 19	FRA; 19	FRA; Ret	NC	0
2014	Ducati	AUS	AUS	SPA	SPA	NED	NED	ITA; Ret	ITA; DNS	GBR	GBR	MAL	MAL	ITA; 14	ITA; 13	POR	POR	USA	USA	SPA	SPA	FRA	FRA	QAT	QAT	29th	5

=== CIV Championship (Campionato Italiano Velocita) ===
==== Races by year ====
(key) (Races in bold indicate pole position; races in italics indicate fastest lap)

Year	Class	Bike	1	2	3	4	5	6	Pos	Pts
2002	125cc	Honda	IMO	VAL	MUG	MIS1	MIS2; 11		23rd	5
2003	Supersport	Yamaha	MIS1; 3	MUG1; Ret	MIS1; 2	MUG2; 1	VAL; 5		2nd	72
2004	Supersport	Yamaha	**MUG**; 2	IMO; 4	VAL1; 6	MIS; Ret	VAL2; 5		5th	54
2005	Supersport	Yamaha	VAL; 5	MON; 4	IMO; 7	MIS1; 4	MUG; 5	MIS2; 3	4th	73
