= Javier del Amor =

Spanish motorcycle racer

- Nationality: Spanish
- Born: 6 August 1976 (age 50); Sant Sadurní d'Anoia, Spain
- Current team: Graphbikes Easyrace SBK Team
- Bike number: 5
Motorcycle racing career statistics
MotoGP World Championship
Active years	2013
Manufacturers	FTR
Championships	0
2013 championship position	27th (1 pt)
Starts / Wins / Podiums / Poles / F. laps / Points; 1 / 0 / 0 / 0 / 0 / 1

Javier del Amor (born 6 August 1976) is a retired Spanish motorcycle racer. He rode a BMW S1000RR in the RFME Superstock 1000 Championship. Del Amor made his only appearance in MotoGP as a replacement rider the 2013 Catalan Grand Prix when FTR competitor Hiroshi Aoyama required microsurgery to a broken finger he sustained in practice.

== Career statistics ==
=== Superbike World Championship ===
==== Races by year ====
(key) (Races in bold indicate pole position) (Races in italics indicate fastest lap)

Year	Make	1		2		3		4		5		6		7		8		9		10		11		12		Pos.	Pts
Year	Make	R1	R2	R1	R2	R1	R2	R1	R2	R1	R2	R1	R2	R1	R2	R1	R2	R1	R2	R1	R2	R1	R2	R1	R2	Pos.	Pts
2006	Honda	QAT	QAT	AUS	AUS	SPA; DNS	SPA; DNS	ITA	ITA	EUR	EUR	SMR	SMR	CZE	CZE	GBR	GBR	NED	NED	GER	GER	ITA	ITA	FRA	FRA	NC	0

=== By season ===
Season	Class	Motorcycle	Team	Number	Race	Win	Podium	Pole	FLap	Pts	Plcd
2013	MotoGP	FTR	Avintia Blusens	77	1	0	0	0	0	1	27th
Total					**1**	**0**	**0**	**0**	**0**	**1**	

=== Races by year ===
(key) (Races in bold indicate pole position) (Races in italics indicate fastest lap)

Year	Class	Bike	1	2	3	4	5	6	7	8	9	10	11	12	13	14	15	16	17	18	Pos.	Pts
2013	MotoGP	FTR	QAT	AME	SPA	FRA	ITA	CAT; 15	NED	GER	USA	INP	CZE	GBR	RSM	ARA	MAL	AUS	JPN	VAL	27th	1
