= Silverstone Superbike World Championship round =

Silverstone Superbike World Championship round may refer to:

- 2002 Silverstone Superbike World Championship round
- 2006 Silverstone Superbike World Championship round
- 2007 Silverstone Superbike World Championship round
- 2010 Silverstone Superbike World Championship round
- 2011 Silverstone Superbike World Championship round

== See also ==
- Silverstone Circuit
