= Valencia Superbike World Championship round =

Valencia Superbike World Championship round may refer to:

- 2002 Valencia Superbike World Championship round
- 2005 Valencia Superbike World Championship round
- 2006 Valencia Superbike World Championship round
- 2007 Valencia Superbike World Championship round
- 2008 Valencia Superbike World Championship round
- 2009 Valencia Superbike World Championship round
- 2010 Valencia Superbike World Championship round

== See also ==
- Circuit Ricardo Tormo
