= Monza Superbike World Championship round =

Monza Superbike World Championship round may refer to:

- 2002 Monza Superbike World Championship round
- 2006 Monza Superbike World Championship round
- 2007 Monza Superbike World Championship round
- 2008 Monza Superbike World Championship round
- 2009 Monza Superbike World Championship round
- 2010 Monza Superbike World Championship round
- 2011 Monza Superbike World Championship round
- 2012 Monza Superbike World Championship round

== See also ==
- Autodromo Nazionale Monza
