= Craig Jones (motorcyclist) =

British motorcycle racer (1985–2008)

- Nationality: British
- Born: 16 January 1985; Crewe, Cheshire, England
- Died: 4 August 2008 (aged 23); West Kingsdown, Kent, England

Craig Jones (16 January 1985 – 4 August 2008) was an English motorcycle racer. He grew up in the town of Northwich in Cheshire and attended Charles Darwin Primary School, and later Hartford High School. He died in 2008, shortly after a racing accident when he fell and was struck by another motorcycle.

== Biography ==
Born at Leighton Hospital Crewe, Cheshire, Jones grew up in nearby Northwich and remained there until later in his career he moved to Peterborough. Jones was a successful racer in the lower ranks of the British motorcycling ladder, winning the 1996 British Junior Mini-Moto Championship, the 1997 British Senior Mini-Moto Championship and the 2002 British Junior Superstock Championship before moving up to the British Supersport Championship.

In 2003 and 2004, Jones rode a Daytona 600 in the British Supersport Championship, initially with teammate Jim Moodie in the Valmoto team run by experienced tuner/team manager Jack Valentine in conjunction with the Triumph factory, which returned to racing in 2003 after an absence of 30 years. Jones was retained by Valmoto as sole-rider for 2004, and finished the season with a win at the last round and in eighth position overall.

In 2005 Jones has his best year in the British Supersport Championship riding for the Northpoint Honda team, achieving seven podium finishes and second overall in the title contest behind Leon Camier. Jones' riding that year earned him wildcard entry into the two British rounds of World Supersport, where he performed impressively. Jones qualified on the front row at Silverstone and was contesting the lead when he pulled out of the race with clutch problems, and he finished eighth at Brands Hatch. Jones was also called up as a stand-in rider for the prestigious Ten Kate Honda team at Brno, where he finished sixth.

Jones moved up to the Superbike World Championship for the 2006 season on the uncompetitive Foggy Petronas FP1. A solitary thirteenth place at Imola was his only points finish in the championship.

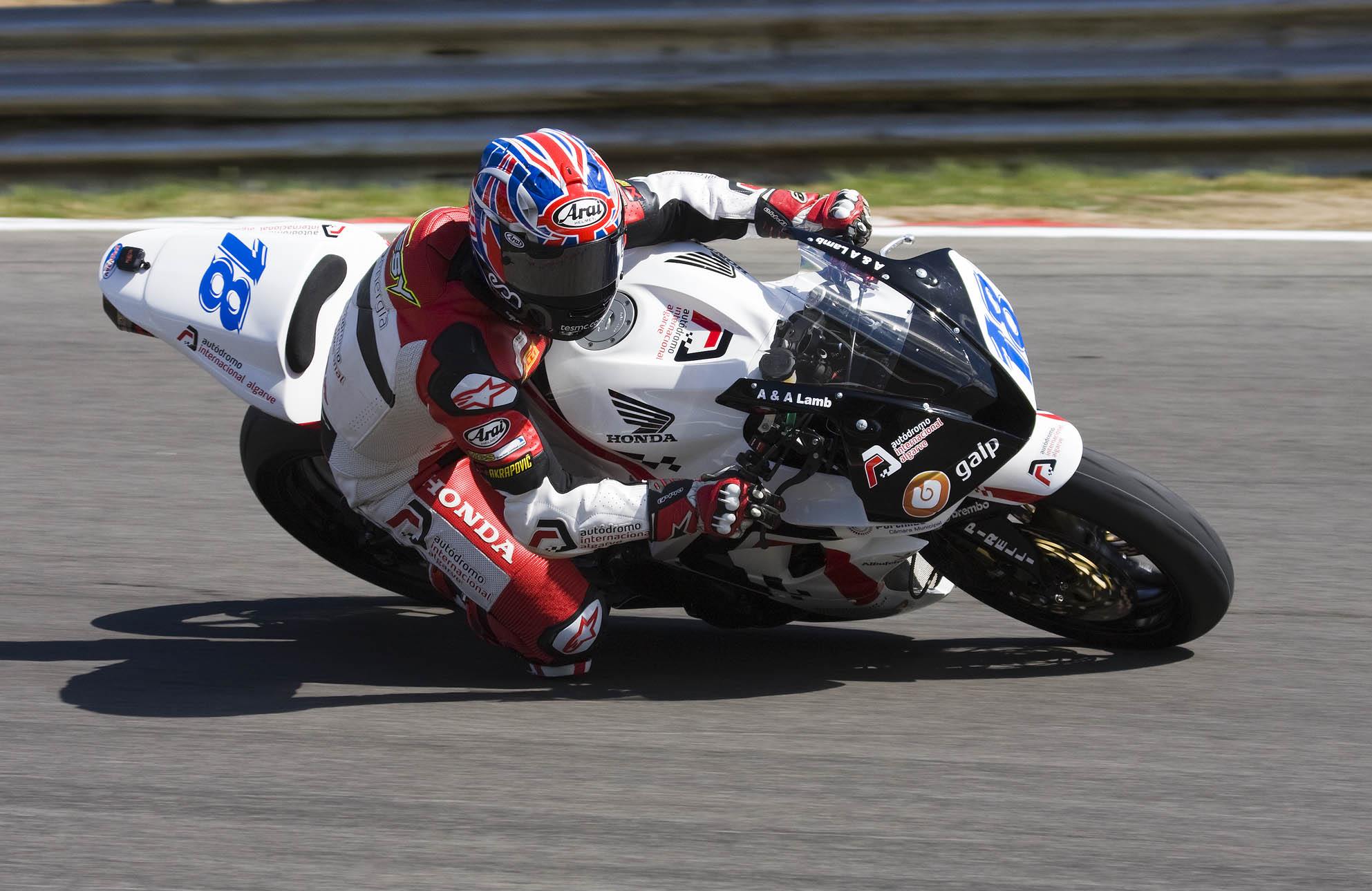
Jones in August 2008

In 2007, Jones returned to the Supersport World Championship category for his first season as a full-time supersport rider, riding with the Reve Ekerold Honda team. Jones suffered many technical problems early in the season, and crashed out of the lead at Brands Hatch, but a took podiums at Brno, and in the season's final two rounds Vallelunga and Magny-Cours. At Vallelunga, he was leading when the red flag was thrown, but lost the race to Kenan Sofuoğlu as the Turkish rider was leading the last completed lap. The podium at Magny-Cours moved him up from seventh to fifth in the final standings.

For 2008, Jones remained in Supersport, riding a factory supported Honda for the Portuguese-based Parkalgar Racing Team, with his team now managed by Simon Buckmaster, and added three more podiums including the season-opener at Losail and again at Valencia after an intense battle with Fabien Foret. Despite finishing off the podium at the Monza race, due to a severe hand injury caused in practice, and technical problems in the race at Brno (where he was at the front just two laps before the end), he was sixth in the championship before his ultimately tragic home round at Brands Hatch.

== Death ==
Jones died as a result of head injuries sustained in a fall and subsequent collision during the Brands Hatch round of the 2008 Supersport World Championship season.

The fall occurred at Clark Curve, a fast right-hand turn that leads into the home straight of the Brands Hatch circuit, on 3 August. At the time of the fall, Jones was in second position and challenging Jonathan Rea for the lead. As Jones accelerated out of the curve the rear wheel of his Honda CBR600RR lost traction and he was thrown across the track into the path of oncoming riders. The Australian rider Andrew Pitt attempted to take evasive action, but the front wheel and the footrest of his machine collided with Jones' helmet.

The race was immediately stopped by officials so that medical personnel could attend to Jones, and he was taken to the Brands Hatch medical center where Clinica Mobile doctors resuscitated him on four occasions. He was air-lifted by the Kent Air Ambulance to the Royal London Hospital. Jones' condition was assessed as 'extremely critical' upon his arrival and he was induced into a pharmacological coma by doctors in an attempt to stabilise his condition. This intervention was unsuccessful and Jones was pronounced dead by doctors shortly after 00.30 local time on 4 August 2008. As Jones was running second in the race at the time of the race stoppage, he moved up to fifth in the championship. Fellow racers Tommy Hill and James Toseland were at his bedside as he died.

Four-time world champion and former team boss of Jones, Carl Fogarty, said that "Craig was one of a crop of good young riders who were the future of British racing and I took a chance on him to ride for our team in 2006 because I thought he was the pick of the bunch."

== Tributes ==
The Algarve International Circuit in Portimão, whose owners are also involved in Jones' Parkalgar Honda team, has named a corner on the track after Jones.

British Superbike rider Cal Crutchlow raced in one of Jones' spare helmets at the BSB meeting at Knockhill a week later.

On 14 March 2009, Eugene Laverty won for Parkalgar at Losail in World Supersport. His bike carried a small decal of Jones' #18, and in the post-race interview Laverty dedicated the win to Jones, crediting the work he had done in making the team competitive.

On 17 August 2008, James Toseland rode the Czech Republic motorcycle Grand Prix with a black armband and carried Jones' number 18 on his fairing to express his sadness.

On 7 September 2008, Tommy Hill rode Jones' bike around one lap of Donington Park in remembrance of his friend, while carrying the English flag. The marshalls also waved their flags.

=== Craig Jones memorial at the Autódromo Internacional do Algarve ===
On 22 October 2009, a tribute ceremony occurred, with the exhibition of a provisional statue, created by the Portuguese sculptor Paula Hespanha, representing Craig Jones on his motorbike after passing the finishing line. This statue will be the main part of a monument, already partially built, which also includes the architectural arrangement of the main access roundabout to the racetrack, created by Paula Hespanha and Portuguese architect Manuel Pedro Ferreira Chaves. This monument is a landscape sculpture, representing the main straight of a racing circuit, which extends up to the car park of the main grandstand. This large-scale artistic intervention serves to frame the statue but will also be useful as an access that will allow pedestrian approach to the statue. The owner of Autódromo Internacional do Algarve and Parkalgar racing team, Paulo Pinheiro, declared: "it is a very special thanks to Craig Jones who will be forever immortalized in our memories. This tribute will keep alive the admiration and respect for the work of Craig in the motorcycling world ". "This monument will ensure that Craig Jones will never be forgotten."

The inauguration of the marble and stainless steel statue occurred in 2009.

== Career statistics ==
=== Superbike World Championship ===
==== Races by year ====
(key) (Races in bold indicate pole position) (Races in italics indicate fastest lap)

Year	Bike	1		2		3		4		5		6		7		8		9		10		11		12		13		14		Pos	Pts
Year	Bike	R1	R2	R1	R2	R1	R2	R1	R2	R1	R2	R1	R2	R1	R2	R1	R2	R1	R2	R1	R2	R1	R2	R1	R2	R1	R2	R1	R2	Pos	Pts
2006	Petronas	QAT; Ret	QAT; Ret	AUS; Ret	AUS; 21	SPA; 22	SPA; 25	ITA; Ret	ITA; Ret	EUR; Ret	EUR; DNS	SMR; 21	SMR; 21	CZE; 17	CZE; 21	GBR; Ret	GBR; Ret	NED; Ret	NED; Ret	GER; 18	GER; 13	ITA; 17	ITA; Ret	FRA; 17	FRA; Ret					27th	3

== See also ==
- Algarve International Circuit
