= 2006 Superbike World Championship =

2006 Superbike World Championship
Previous:	2005	Next:	2007
Support series: Supersport World Championship; FIM Superstock 1000 Cup; European Superstock 600 Championship

The 2006 Superbike World Championship was the nineteenth FIM Superbike World Championship season. The season started on 25 February at Losail, and finished on 8 October at Magny-Cours after 12 rounds and 24 races. The original season calendar issued by the FIM included a 13th round scheduled in South Africa on 22 October but the round was cancelled at the request of the series' promoter FGSport.

2006 saw the return of Australian Troy Bayliss in Superbike World Championship after 3 years in MotoGP. The combination of Bayliss and Ducati proved unstoppable and they dominated the season winning 12 races, 8 of them consecutive. Honda's James Toseland and Yamaha's Noriyuki Haga battled for second with the British rider coming on top. Defending champion Troy Corser on a Suzuki was fourth. The manufacturers' championship was won by Ducati.

== Race calendar and results ==
2006 Superbike World Championship Calendar
Round		Circuit	Date	Superpole	Fastest lap	Winning rider	Winning team	Report
1	R1	(Qatar) Losail	25 February	(Australia) Troy Bayliss	(Italy) Lorenzo Lanzi	(United Kingdom) James Toseland	Winston Ten Kate Honda	Report
1	R2	(Qatar) Losail	25 February	(Australia) Troy Bayliss	(Japan) Noriyuki Haga	(Australia) Troy Corser	Alstare Suzuki Corona Extra	Report
2	R1	(Australia) Phillip Island	5 March	(Australia) Troy Bayliss	(Australia) Troy Bayliss	(Australia) Troy Corser	Alstare Suzuki Corona Extra	Report
2	R2	(Australia) Phillip Island	5 March	(Australia) Troy Bayliss	(Australia) Troy Bayliss	(Australia) Troy Bayliss	Ducati Xerox	Report
3	R1	(Spain) Valencia	23 April	(Australia) Troy Corser	(Australia) Troy Corser	(Australia) Troy Bayliss	Ducati Xerox	Report
3	R2	(Spain) Valencia	23 April	(Australia) Troy Corser	(Australia) Troy Corser	(Australia) Troy Bayliss	Ducati Xerox	Report
4	R1	(Italy) Monza	7 May	(Australia) Troy Corser	(Brazil) Alex Barros	(Australia) Troy Bayliss	Ducati Xerox	Report
4	R2	(Italy) Monza	7 May	(Australia) Troy Corser	(Australia) Troy Bayliss	(Australia) Troy Bayliss	Ducati Xerox	Report
5	R1	(Europe) Silverstone	28 May	(United Kingdom) Tommy Hill	(Spain) Rubén Xaus	(Australia) Troy Bayliss	Ducati Xerox	Report
5	R2	(Europe) Silverstone	28 May	(United Kingdom) Tommy Hill	(Australia) Troy Bayliss	(Australia) Troy Bayliss	Ducati Xerox	Report
6	R1	(San Marino) Misano	25 June	(United Kingdom) James Toseland	(Australia) Troy Bayliss	(Australia) Troy Bayliss	Ducati Xerox	Report
6	R2	(San Marino) Misano	25 June	(United Kingdom) James Toseland	(Australia) Andrew Pitt	(Australia) Andrew Pitt	Yamaha Motor Italia WSB	Report
7	R1	(Czech Republic) Brno	23 July	(Japan) Noriyuki Haga	(Japan) Yukio Kagayama	(Japan) Yukio Kagayama	Alstare Suzuki Corona Extra	Report
7	R2	(Czech Republic) Brno	23 July	(Japan) Noriyuki Haga	(Japan) Noriyuki Haga	(Japan) Yukio Kagayama	Alstare Suzuki Corona Extra	Report
8	R1	(United Kingdom) Brands Hatch	6 August	(Australia) Troy Bayliss	(United Kingdom) James Toseland	(Australia) Troy Bayliss	Ducati Xerox	Report
8	R2	(United Kingdom) Brands Hatch	6 August	(Australia) Troy Bayliss	(Australia) Troy Bayliss	(Japan) Noriyuki Haga	Yamaha Motor Italia WSB	Report
9	R1	(Netherlands) Assen	3 September	(Australia) Troy Corser	(Spain) Rubén Xaus	(United Kingdom) Chris Walker	PSG-1 Kawasaki Corse	Report
9	R2	(Netherlands) Assen	3 September	(Australia) Troy Corser	(Australia) Troy Bayliss	(Australia) Troy Bayliss	Ducati Xerox	Report
10	R1	(Germany) EuroSpeedway Lausitz	10 September	(Australia) Troy Bayliss	(Australia) Troy Bayliss	(Japan) Yukio Kagayama	Alstare Suzuki Corona Extra	Report
10	R2	(Germany) EuroSpeedway Lausitz	10 September	(Australia) Troy Bayliss	(Japan) Yukio Kagayama	(United Kingdom) James Toseland	Winston Ten Kate Honda	Report
11	R1	(Italy) Imola	1 October	(Australia) Troy Bayliss	(Brazil) Alex Barros	(Brazil) Alex Barros	Klaffi Honda	Report
11	R2	(Italy) Imola	1 October	(Australia) Troy Bayliss	(Australia) Troy Bayliss	(Australia) Troy Bayliss	Ducati Xerox	Report
12	R1	(France) Magny-Cours	8 October	(Australia) Troy Corser	(Japan) Noriyuki Haga	(United Kingdom) James Toseland	Winston Ten Kate Honda	Report
12	R2	(France) Magny-Cours	8 October	(Australia) Troy Corser	(Australia) Troy Bayliss	(Australia) Troy Bayliss	Ducati Xerox	Report

== Championship standings ==
=== Riders' standings ===
2006 final riders' standings
Pos.	Rider	Bike	QAT (Qatar)		AUS (Australia)		ESP (Spain)		ITA (Italy)		EUR (Europe)		SMR (San Marino)		CZE (Czech Republic)		GBR (United Kingdom)		NED (Netherlands)		GER (Germany)		ITA (Italy)		FRA (France)		Pts
Pos.	Rider	Bike	R1	R2	R1	R2	R1	R2	R1	R2	R1	R2	R1	R2	R1	R2	R1	R2	R1	R2	R1	R2	R1	R2	R1	R2	Pts
1	(Australia) Troy Bayliss	Ducati	**2**	**2**	**6**	**1**	1	1	1	1	1	1	1	12	Ret	8	**1**	**2**	Ret	1	**7**	**3**	**5**	**1**	4	1	431
2	(United Kingdom) James Toseland	Honda	1	4	3	2	9	11	Ret	5	3	3	**2**	**8**	2	5	2	5	10	9	9	1	2	5	1	3	336
3	(Japan) Noriyuki Haga	Yamaha	Ret	3	4	4	5	5	4	3	2	2	5	3	**4**	**3**	3	1	Ret	Ret	2	2	4	6	2	4	326
4	(Australia) Troy Corser	Suzuki	4	1	1	Ret	**2**	**2**	**3**	**2**	Ret	6	Ret	Ret	5	4	6	6	**Ret**	**Ret**	3	14	Ret	9	**3**	**2**	254
5	(Australia) Andrew Pitt	Yamaha	3	5	9	5	10	9	5	6	5	4	16	1	Ret	Ret	4	3	2	2	4	Ret	3	4	18	5	250
6	(Brazil) Alex Barros	Honda	6	7	2	3	11	14	2	4	9	5	4	2	Ret	11	8	9	Ret	7	5	Ret	1	2	7	10	246
7	(Japan) Yukio Kagayama	Suzuki	Ret	Ret	12	6	6	Ret	Ret	Ret	14	13	3	5	1	1	5	7	Ret	4	1	4	Ret	3	5	9	211
8	(Italy) Lorenzo Lanzi	Ducati	Ret	6	11	Ret	3	3	9	11	13	16	7	7	Ret	9	12	11	7	6	8	6	6	7	8	7	169
9	(United Kingdom) Chris Walker	Kawasaki	Ret	16	10	10	23	7	11	9	6	8	Ret	4	7	10	7	8	1	14	11	10	12	14	6	8	158
10	(Spain) Fonsi Nieto	Kawasaki	Ret	12	8	9	Ret	6	Ret	8	11	10	8	11	6	6	14	Ret	4	3	10	7	7	13	Ret	Ret	139
11	(Italy) Michel Fabrizio	Honda	5	8	15	11	13	10	Ret	14	Ret	15	Ret	6	3	2	Ret	12	3	10	Ret	8	Ret	Ret	11	13	125
12	(Australia) Karl Muggeridge	Honda	12	9	Ret	Ret			6	7	8	9	11	14	11	7	Ret	Ret	9	13	6	5	8	8	Ret	6	123
13	(Japan) Norifumi Abe	Yamaha	11	11	17	12	4	4	Ret	16	10	11	10	13	9	12	13	13	5	Ret	16	11	9	11	13	12	112
14	(Spain) Rubén Xaus	Ducati	15	10	7	8	7	Ret	Ret	15	4	7	9	9	Ret	14	10	10	Ret	5	15	9	Ret	Ret	WD	WD	103
15	(France) Régis Laconi	Kawasaki	13	Ret	13	16	8	8	7	Ret	7	14	6	19	Ret	16	9	4	Ret	8	12	19	10	10	9	18	103
16	(Italy) Roberto Rolfo	Ducati	7	13	5	7	Ret	16	8	10	17	19	15	15	12	17	18	18	8	12	Ret	17	14	15	14	17	69
17	(Japan) Shinichi Nakatomi	Yamaha	16	17	Ret	19	12	12	10	12	DNS	DNS	Ret	18	8	13	19	17	13	Ret	17	15	11	12	10	Ret	48
18	(Germany) Max Neukirchner	Ducati	10	Ret	18	13	Ret	18	Ret	Ret	16	Ret	DNS	DNS													28
18	(Germany) Max Neukirchner	Suzuki																	6	Ret	13	Ret	Ret	Ret	12	14	28
19	(France) Sébastien Gimbert	Yamaha	14	15	Ret	20			12	Ret	Ret	Ret	12	Ret	13	15	15	14	Ret	DNS			Ret	Ret	Ret	11	23
20	(France) Fabien Foret	Suzuki	Ret	Ret	Ret	18	15	13	13	13	Ret	Ret	13	10	Ret	20											19
21	(Australia) Steve Martin	Petronas	18	18	14	15	Ret	15	Ret	Ret	Ret	Ret	Ret	17	Ret	19	17	16	12	11	14	12	Ret	16	Ret	Ret	19
22	(Italy) Pierfrancesco Chili	Honda	8	Ret	16	14							20	Ret	10	Ret	Ret	Ret	Ret	Ret	Ret	Ret	16	18	Ret	15	17
23	(United Kingdom) Tommy Hill	Yamaha									**12**	**12**					11	Ret									13
24	(Italy) Ivan Clementi	Ducati	Ret	19	19	17	Ret	Ret	15	Ret	Ret	Ret	17	20	15	Ret	21	Ret	11	16	Ret	18	13	Ret	Ret	Ret	10
25	(Italy) Marco Borciani	Ducati	9	14	Ret	Ret	17	17	Ret	21	DNS	DNS	Ret	Ret	16	Ret	Ret	Ret	Ret	Ret	Ret	DNS	Ret	Ret			9
26	(Italy) Vittorio Iannuzzo	Suzuki	17	Ret	Ret	Ret	16	26	Ret	17	18	Ret	14	16	14	18	16	15	15	Ret	Ret	16	Ret	Ret			6
26	(Italy) Vittorio Iannuzzo	Ducati																							16	Ret	6
27	(United Kingdom) Craig Jones	Petronas	Ret	Ret	Ret	21	22	25	Ret	Ret	Ret	DNS	21	21	17	21	Ret	Ret	Ret	Ret	18	13	17	Ret	17	Ret	3
28	(Australia) Josh Brookes	Kawasaki									Ret	18	18	Ret	18	Ret	20	Ret	Ret	15	20	23	15	17	15	16	3
29	(Netherlands) Harry van Beek	Suzuki																	14	Ret							2
30	(Italy) Lorenzo Alfonsi	Yamaha					Ret	Ret																			2
30	(Italy) Lorenzo Alfonsi	Ducati							14	19			22	Ret													2
31	(Spain) José David de Gea	Honda					14	19																			2
32	(Italy) Gianluca Nannelli	Honda					Ret	23	Ret	25	15	17	Ret	Ret													1
	(Italy) Norino Brignola	Ducati					20	22	16	20			19	Ret									Ret	Ret			0
	(Italy) Lorenzo Mauri	Ducati							17	22																	0
	(Italy) Franco Battaini	Kawasaki	19	20	20	22	19	21	18	23																	0
	(Italy) Giovanni Bussei	Honda					18	20																			0
	(Italy) Valter Bartolini	Ducati																					18	Ret			0
	(Poland) Paweł Szkopek	Ducati													19	Ret											0
	(United States) Kurtis Roberts	Ducati															Ret	Ret	Ret	Ret	19	Ret	Ret	Ret	Ret	Ret	0
	(Italy) Ivan Goi	Honda																					Ret	19	19	Ret	0
	(Italy) Lucio Pedercini	Ducati	20	Ret	Ret	Ret	WD	WD																			0
	(Czech Republic) Jiří Dražďák	Yamaha													20	22					Ret	22			Ret	Ret	0
	(Germany) Stefan Nebel	Kawasaki																			Ret	20					0
	(Qatar) Talal Al Naimi	Yamaha	21	21																							0
	(Belgium) Didier Van Keymeulen	Yamaha																			21	21					0
	(Slovenia) Berto Camlek	Yamaha													21	23											0
	(Spain) Sergio Fuertes	Suzuki					21	Ret																			0
	(Spain) Josep Monge	Yamaha					24	24																			0
	(Czech Republic) Miloš Čihák	Suzuki													Ret	Ret											0
	(Czech Republic) Jiří Mrkývka	Ducati													Ret	Ret											0
	(Spain) Javier del Amor	Honda					WD	WD																			0
	(Australia) Anthony Gobert	Suzuki					WD	WD																			0
	(Czech Republic) Marek Svoboda	Yamaha													DNS	DNS											0
Pos.	Rider	Bike	QAT (Qatar)		AUS (Australia)		ESP (Spain)		ITA (Italy)		EUR (Europe)		SMR (San Marino)		CZE (Czech Republic)		GBR (United Kingdom)		NED (Netherlands)		GER (Germany)		ITA (Italy)		FRA (France)		Pts

Colour	Result
Gold	Winner
Silver	Second place
Bronze	Third place
Green	Points classification
Blue	Non-points classification
Blue	Non-classified finish (NC)
Purple	Retired, not classified (Ret)
Red	Did not qualify (DNQ)
Red	Did not pre-qualify (DNPQ)
Black	Disqualified (DSQ)
White	Did not start (DNS)
White	Withdrew (WD)
White	Race cancelled (C)
Blank	Did not practice (DNP)
Blank	Did not arrive (DNA)
Blank	Excluded (EX)

**Bold** – Pole position
Italics – Fastest lap

=== Teams' standings ===
Pos.	Team	Bike No.	QAT (Qatar)		AUS (Australia)		ESP (Spain)		ITA (Italy)		EUR (Europe)		SMR (San Marino)		CZE (Czech Republic)		GBR (United Kingdom)		NED (Netherlands)		GER (Germany)		ITA (Italy)		FRA (France)		Pts.
Pos.	Team	Bike No.	R1	R2	R1	R2	R1	R2	R1	R2	R1	R2	R1	R2	R1	R2	R1	R2	R1	R2	R1	R2	R1	R2	R1	R2	Pts.
1	(Italy) Ducati Xerox	21	**2**	**2**	**6**	**1**	1	1	1	1	1	1	1	12	Ret	8	**1**	**2**	Ret	1	**7**	**3**	**5**	**1**	4	1	600
1	(Italy) Ducati Xerox	57	Ret	6	11	Ret	3	3	9	11	13	16	7	7	Ret	9	12	11	7	6	8	6	6	7	8	7	600
2	(Italy) Yamaha Motor Italia WSB	41	Ret	3	4	4	5	5	4	3	2	2	5	3	**4**	**3**	3	1	Ret	Ret	2	2	4	6	2	4	576
2	(Italy) Yamaha Motor Italia WSB	88	3	5	9	5	10	9	5	6	5	4	16	1	Ret	Ret	4	3	2	2	4	Ret	3	4	18	5	576
3	(Belgium) Alstare Suzuki Corona Extra	1	4	1	1	Ret	**2**	**2**	**3**	**2**	Ret	6	Ret	Ret	5	4	6	6	**Ret**	**Ret**	3	14	Ret	9	**3**	**2**	465
3	(Belgium) Alstare Suzuki Corona Extra	71	Ret	Ret	12	6	6	Ret	Ret	Ret	14	13	3	5	1	1	5	7	Ret	4	1	4	Ret	3	5	9	465
4	(Netherlands) Winston Ten Kate Honda	31	12	9	Ret	Ret			6	7	8	9	11	14	11	7	Ret	Ret	9	13	6	5	8	8	Ret	6	459
4	(Netherlands) Winston Ten Kate Honda	52	1	4	3	2	9	11	Ret	5	3	3	**2**	**8**	2	5	2	5	10	9	9	1	2	5	1	3	459
4	(Netherlands) Winston Ten Kate Honda	200					18	20																			459
5	(San Marino) PSG-1 Kawasaki Corse	9	Ret	16	10	10	23	7	11	9	6	8	Ret	4	7	10	7	8	1	14	11	10	12	14	6	8	261
5	(San Marino) PSG-1 Kawasaki Corse	55	13	Ret	13	16	8	8	7	Ret	7	14	6	19	Ret	16	9	4	Ret	8	12	19	10	10	9	18	261
6	(Austria) Klaffi Honda	4	6	7	2	3	11	14	2	4	9	5	4	2	Ret	11	8	9	Ret	7	5	Ret	1	2	7	10	246
7	(Italy) D.F.X. Treme	7	8	Ret	16	14							20	Ret	10	Ret	Ret	Ret	Ret	Ret	Ret	Ret	16	18	Ret	15	143
7	(Italy) D.F.X. Treme	69					Ret	23	Ret	25	15	17	Ret	Ret													143
7	(Italy) D.F.X. Treme	84	5	8	15	11	13	10	Ret	14	Ret	15	Ret	6	3	2	Ret	12	3	10	Ret	8	Ret	Ret	11	13	143
8	(San Marino) PSG-1 Kawasaki Corse 2	10	Ret	12	8	9	Ret	6	Ret	8	11	10	8	11	6	6	14	Ret	4	3	10	7	7	13	Ret	Ret	139
9	Yamaha Motor France–Ipone	3	11	11	17	12	4	4	Ret	16	10	11	10	13	9	12	13	13	5	Ret	16	11	9	11	13	12	135
9	Yamaha Motor France–Ipone	16	14	15	Ret	20			12	Ret	Ret	Ret	12	Ret	13	15	15	14	Ret	DNS			Ret	Ret	Ret	11	135
9	Yamaha Motor France–Ipone	61					Ret	Ret																			135
10	(Italy) Sterilgarda – Berik	11	15	10	7	8	7	Ret	Ret	15	4	7	9	9	Ret	14	10	10	Ret	5	15	9	Ret	Ret	WD	WD	112
10	(Italy) Sterilgarda – Berik	13																							16	Ret	112
10	(Italy) Sterilgarda – Berik	20	9	14	Ret	Ret	17	17	Ret	21	DNS	DNS	Ret	Ret	16	Ret	Ret	Ret	Ret	Ret	Ret	DNS	Ret	Ret			112
11	(Italy) Ducati SC – Caracchi	44	7	13	5	7	Ret	16	8	10	17	19	15	15	12	17	18	18	8	12	Ret	17	14	15	14	17	69
12	(Belgium) Alstare Eng. Corona Extra	15	Ret	Ret	Ret	18	15	13	13	13	Ret	Ret	13	10	Ret	20											38
12	(Belgium) Alstare Eng. Corona Extra	76																	6	Ret	13	Ret	Ret	Ret	12	14	38
13	Yamaha Motor France–Ipone 2	38	16	17	Ret	19	12	12	10	12	DNS	DNS	Ret	18	8	13	19	17	13	Ret	17	15	11	12	10	Ret	38
14	(Malaysia) Foggy Petronas Racing	18	Ret	Ret	Ret	21	22	25	Ret	Ret	Ret	DNS	21	21	17	21	Ret	Ret	Ret	Ret	18	13	17	Ret	17	Ret	22
14	(Malaysia) Foggy Petronas Racing	99	18	18	14	15	Ret	15	Ret	Ret	Ret	Ret	Ret	17	Ret	19	17	16	12	11	14	12	Ret	16	Ret	Ret	22
15	(Italy) Team Pedercini	8	Ret	19	19	17	Ret	Ret	15	Ret	Ret	Ret	17	20	15	Ret	21	Ret	11	16	Ret	18	13	Ret	Ret	Ret	19
15	(Italy) Team Pedercini	19	20	Ret	Ret	Ret	WD	WD																			19
15	(Italy) Team Pedercini	76	10	Ret	18	13	Ret	18	Ret	Ret	16	Ret	DNS	DNS													19
15	(Italy) Team Pedercini	80															Ret	Ret	Ret	Ret	19	Ret	Ret	Ret	Ret	Ret	19
15	(Italy) Team Pedercini	91													19	Ret											19
16	(Italy) Celani Team Suzuki Italia	13	17	Ret	Ret	Ret	16	26	Ret	17	18	Ret	14	16	14	18	16	15	15	Ret	Ret	16	Ret	Ret			6
17	(Italy) Kawasaki Bertocchi	25									Ret	18	18	Ret	18	Ret	20	Ret	Ret	15	20	23	15	17	15	16	3
17	(Italy) Kawasaki Bertocchi	116	19	20	20	22	19	21	18	23																	3
Pos.	Team	Bike No.	QAT (Qatar)		AUS (Australia)		ESP (Spain)		ITA (Italy)		EUR (Europe)		SMR (San Marino)		CZE (Czech Republic)		GBR (United Kingdom)		NED (Netherlands)		GER (Germany)		ITA (Italy)		FRA (France)		Pts.

=== Manufacturers' standings ===
2006 final manufacturers' standings
Pos.	Manufacturer	QAT (Qatar)		AUS (Australia)		ESP (Spain)		ITA (Italy)		EUR (Europe)		SMR (San Marino)		CZE (Czech Republic)		GBR (United Kingdom)		NED (Netherlands)		GER (Germany)		ITA (Italy)		FRA (France)		Pts
Pos.	Manufacturer	R1	R2	R1	R2	R1	R2	R1	R2	R1	R2	R1	R2	R1	R2	R1	R2	R1	R2	R1	R2	R1	R2	R1	R2	Pts
1	(Italy) Ducati	2	2	5	1	1	1	1	1	1	1	1	7	12	8	1	2	7	1	7	3	5	1	4	1	450
2	(Japan) Honda	1	4	2	2	9	10	2	4	3	3	2	2	2	2	2	5	3	7	5	1	1	2	1	3	414
3	(Japan) Yamaha	3	3	4	4	4	4	4	3	2	2	5	1	4	3	3	1	2	2	2	2	3	4	2	4	401
4	(Japan) Suzuki	4	1	1	6	2	2	3	2	14	6	3	5	1	1	5	6	6	4	1	4	Ret	3	3	2	372
5	(Japan) Kawasaki	13	12	8	9	8	6	7	8	6	8	6	4	6	6	7	4	1	3	10	7	7	10	6	8	229
6	(Malaysia) Petronas	18	18	14	15	22	15	Ret	Ret	Ret	Ret	21	17	17	19	17	16	12	11	14	12	17	16	17	Ret	19
Pos.	Manufacturer	QAT (Qatar)		AUS (Australia)		ESP (Spain)		ITA (Italy)		EUR (Europe)		SMR (San Marino)		CZE (Czech Republic)		GBR (United Kingdom)		NED (Netherlands)		GER (Germany)		ITA (Italy)		FRA (France)		Pts

== Entry list ==
Team	Constructor	Motorcycle	No.	Rider	Rounds
(Belgium) Alstare Suzuki Corona Extra	Suzuki	Suzuki GSXR1000 K6	1	(Australia) Troy Corser	All
(Belgium) Alstare Suzuki Corona Extra	Suzuki	Suzuki GSXR1000 K6	71	(Japan) Yukio Kagayama	All
Yamaha Motor France–Ipone	Yamaha	Yamaha YZF-R1	3	(Japan) Norifumi Abe	All
Yamaha Motor France–Ipone	Yamaha	Yamaha YZF-R1	16	(France) Sébastien Gimbert	1–2, 4–9, 11–12
Yamaha Motor France–Ipone	Yamaha	Yamaha YZF-R1	61	(Italy) Lorenzo Alfonsi	3
(Austria) Klaffi Honda	Honda	Honda CBR1000RR	4	(Brazil) Alex Barros	All
(Italy) D.F.X. Treme	Honda	Honda CBR1000RR	7	(Italy) Pierfrancesco Chili	1–2, 6–12
(Italy) D.F.X. Treme	Honda	Honda CBR1000RR	69	(Italy) Gianluca Nannelli	3–6
(Italy) D.F.X. Treme	Honda	Honda CBR1000RR	84	(Italy) Michel Fabrizio	All
(Italy) Team Pedercini	Ducati	Ducati 999 RS	8	(Italy) Ivan Clementi	All
(Italy) Team Pedercini	Ducati	Ducati 999 RS	19	(Italy) Lucio Pedercini	1–3
(Italy) Team Pedercini	Ducati	Ducati 999 RS	76	(Germany) Max Neukirchner	1–6
(Italy) Team Pedercini	Ducati	Ducati 999 RS	80	(United States) Kurtis Roberts	8–12
(Italy) Team Pedercini	Ducati	Ducati 999 RS	91	(Poland) Paweł Szkopek	7
(San Marino) PSG-1 Kawasaki Corse	Kawasaki	Kawasaki ZX10R	9	(United Kingdom) Chris Walker	All
(San Marino) PSG-1 Kawasaki Corse	Kawasaki	Kawasaki ZX10R	55	(France) Régis Laconi	All
(San Marino) PSG-1 Kawasaki Corse 2	Kawasaki	Kawasaki ZX10R	10	(Spain) Fonsi Nieto	All
(Italy) Sterilgarda – Berik	Ducati	Ducati 999 F05	11	(Spain) Rubén Xaus	All
(Italy) Sterilgarda – Berik	Ducati	Ducati 999 F05	13	(Italy) Vittorio Iannuzzo	12
(Italy) Sterilgarda – Berik	Ducati	Ducati 999 F05	20	(Italy) Marco Borciani	1–11
(Italy) Emmebi Team	Honda	Honda CBR1000RR	12	(Italy) Ivan Goi	11–12
(Italy) Celani Team Suzuki Italia	Suzuki	Suzuki GSXR1000 K6	13	(Italy) Vittorio Iannuzzo	1–11
(Belgium) Alstare Eng. Corona Extra	Suzuki	Suzuki GSXR1000 K6	15	(France) Fabien Foret	1–7
(Belgium) Alstare Eng. Corona Extra	Suzuki	Suzuki GSXR1000 K6	76	(Germany) Max Neukirchner	9–12
(Malaysia) Foggy Petronas Racing	Petronas	Petronas FP1	18	(United Kingdom) Craig Jones	All
(Malaysia) Foggy Petronas Racing	Petronas	Petronas FP1	99	(Australia) Steve Martin	All
(Italy) Ducati Xerox	Ducati	Ducati 999 F06	21	(Australia) Troy Bayliss	All
(Italy) Ducati Xerox	Ducati	Ducati 999 F06	57	(Italy) Lorenzo Lanzi	All
(Czech Republic) Prorace	Suzuki	Suzuki GSXR1000 K6	22	(Czech Republic) Miloš Čihák	7
(Czech Republic) SBK Team JM	Ducati	Ducati 999 RS	23	(Czech Republic) Jiří Mrkývka	7
(Italy) Kawasaki Bertocchi	Kawasaki	Kawasaki ZX10R	25	(Australia) Josh Brookes	5–12
(Italy) Kawasaki Bertocchi	Kawasaki	Kawasaki ZX10R	116	(Italy) Franco Battaini	1–4
(Germany) Kawasaki Docshop Racing	Kawasaki	Kawasaki ZX10R	26	(Germany) Stefan Nebel	10
(Germany) Coronas Suzuki Motorrad	Suzuki	Suzuki GSXR1000 K6	27	(Australia) Anthony Gobert	3
(Germany) Coronas Suzuki Motorrad	Suzuki	Suzuki GSXR1000 K6	35	(Spain) Sergio Fuertes	3
(Italy) Spring Ducati	Ducati	Ducati 999 RS	28	(Italy) Lorenzo Mauri	4
(Netherlands) Winston Ten Kate Honda	Honda	Honda CBR1000RR	31	(Australia) Karl Muggeridge	1–2, 4–12
(Netherlands) Winston Ten Kate Honda	Honda	Honda CBR1000RR	52	(United Kingdom) James Toseland	All
(Netherlands) Winston Ten Kate Honda	Honda	Honda CBR1000RR	200	(Italy) Giovanni Bussei	3
(Spain) Honda BQR	Honda	Honda CBR1000RR	32	(Spain) Javier del Amor	3
(Spain) Honda BQR	Honda	Honda CBR1000RR	33	(Spain) José David de Gea	3
(Japan) Yamaha Factory	Yamaha	Yamaha YZF-R1	34	(Spain) Josep Monge	3
(Czech Republic) Pro-SBK Racing (Czech Republic) Yamaha Junior Pro-SBK Racing	Yamaha	Yamaha YZF-R1	36	(Czech Republic) Jiří Dražďák	7, 10, 12
Jafferson Racing	Yamaha	Yamaha YZF-R1	37	(Czech Republic) Marek Svoboda	7
Yamaha Motor France–Ipone 2	Yamaha	Yamaha YZF-R1	38	(Japan) Shinichi Nakatomi	All
Berten Racing	Yamaha	Yamaha YZF-R1	39	(Slovenia) Berto Camlek	7
(Italy) Yamaha Motor Italia WSB	Yamaha	Yamaha YZF-R1	41	(Japan) Noriyuki Haga	All
(Italy) Yamaha Motor Italia WSB	Yamaha	Yamaha YZF-R1	88	(Australia) Andrew Pitt	All
(Italy) Ducati SC – Caracchi	Ducati	Ducati 999 F05	44	(Italy) Roberto Rolfo	All
(Italy) Team Guandalini	Ducati	Ducati 999 RS	66	(Italy) Norino Brignola	3–4, 6, 11
(United Kingdom) Virgin Mobile Yamaha	Yamaha	Yamaha YZF-R1	81	(United Kingdom) Tommy Hill	5, 8
(Germany) MGM – TTSL Racing	Yamaha	Yamaha YZF-R1	83	(Belgium) Didier Van Keymeulen	10
(Italy) PN Corse	Ducati	Ducati 999 RS	85	(Italy) Valter Bartolini	11
(Italy) PN Corse	Ducati	Ducati 999 RS	105	(Italy) Lorenzo Alfonsi	4, 6
(Spain) D'Antin MotoGP	Yamaha	Yamaha YZF-R1	95	(Qatar) Talal Al Naimi	1
(Netherlands) Motoport Den Bosch – Suzuki	Suzuki	Suzuki GSXR1000 K2	96	(Netherlands) Harry van Beek	9

Key
Regular rider
Wildcard rider
Replacement rider
