= 2006 Valencia Superbike World Championship round =

(Spain) 2006 Valencia Superbike World Championship round
Round details
- Round 3 of 12 rounds in the 2006 Superbike World Championship. and Round 3 of 12 rounds in the 2006 Supersport World Championship.
- Date: April 23, 2006
- Location: Valencia
- Course: Permanent racing facility 4.005 km (2.489 mi)

Superbike World Championship
Pole position
(Australia) Troy Corser
1:34.992
Fastest lap race 1	Fastest lap race 2
(Australia) Troy Corser	(Australia) Troy Corser
1:35.722	1:35.374

Supersport World Championship
Pole position
(France) Sébastien Charpentier
1:36.913
Fastest lap
(France) Sébastien Charpentier
1:38.664

The 2006 Valencia Superbike World Championship round was the third round of the 2006 Superbike World Championship. It took place on the weekend of April 21–23, 2006 at the Circuit Ricardo Tormo in Valencia, Spain.

== Results ==
=== Superbike race 1 classification ===
Pos	No	Rider	Bike	Laps	Time	Grid	Points
1	21	(Australia) Troy Bayliss	Ducati 999 F06	23	37:04.634	2	25
2	1	(Australia) Troy Corser	Suzuki GSX-R1000 K6	23	+2.765	1	20
3	57	(Italy) Lorenzo Lanzi	Ducati 999 F06	23	+14.225	3	16
4	3	(Japan) Norifumi Abe	Yamaha YZF R1	23	+17.126	8	13
5	41	(Japan) Noriyuki Haga	Yamaha YZF R1	23	+18.225	10	11
6	71	(Japan) Yukio Kagayama	Suzuki GSX-R1000 K6	23	+18.495	12	10
7	11	(Spain) Rubén Xaus	Ducati 999 F05	23	+22.693	13	9
8	55	(France) Régis Laconi	Kawasaki ZX 10R	23	+24.233	6	8
9	52	(United Kingdom) James Toseland	Honda CBR1000RR	23	+28.799	9	7
10	88	(Australia) Andrew Pitt	Yamaha YZF R1	23	+28.946	11	6
11	4	(Brazil) Alex Barros	Honda CBR1000RR	23	+34.558	16	5
12	38	(Japan) Shinichi Nakatomi	Yamaha YZF R1	23	+37.151	21	4
13	84	(Italy) Michel Fabrizio	Honda CBR1000RR	23	+43.368	18	3
14	33	(Spain) José David de Gea	Honda CBR1000RR	23	+45.753	19	2
15	15	(France) Fabien Foret	Suzuki GSX-R1000 K6	23	+46.586	14	1
16	13	(Italy) Vittorio Iannuzzo	Suzuki GSX-R1000 K6	23	+49.648	22	
17	20	(Italy) Marco Borciani	Ducati 999 F05	23	+58.220	20	
18	200	(Italy) Giovanni Bussei	Honda CBR1000RR	23	+1:00.656	26	
19	116	(Italy) Franco Battaini	Kawasaki ZX 10R	23	+1:10.607	29	
20	66	(Italy) Norino Brignola	Ducati 999 RS	23	+1:11.443	25	
21	35	(Spain) Sergio Fuertes	Suzuki GSX-R1000 K6	23	+1:11.752	28	
22	18	(United Kingdom) Craig Jones	Petronas FP1	23	+1:15.123	27	
23	9	(United Kingdom) Chris Walker	Kawasaki ZX 10R	23	+1:40.231	7	
24	34	(Spain) Josep Monge	Yamaha YZF R1	20	+3 laps	30	
Ret	10	(Spain) Fonsi Nieto	Kawasaki ZX 10R	17	Retirement	5	
Ret	61	(Italy) Lorenzo Alfonsi	Yamaha YZF R1	16	Retirement	31	
Ret	69	(Italy) Gianluca Nannelli	Honda CBR1000RR	14	Retirement	23	
Ret	99	(Australia) Steve Martin	Petronas FP1	13	Retirement	4	
Ret	44	(Italy) Roberto Rolfo	Ducati 999 F05	13	Retirement	15	
Ret	8	(Italy) Ivan Clementi	Ducati 999 RS	10	Retirement	24	
Ret	76	(Germany) Max Neukirchner	Ducati 999 RS	10	Retirement	17	
DNS	32	(Spain) Javier del Amor	Honda CBR1000RR		Not started		
DNS	19	(Italy) Lucio Pedercini	Ducati 999 RS		Not started		

=== Superbike race 2 classification ===
Pos	No	Rider	Bike	Laps	Time	Grid	Points
1	21	(Australia) Troy Bayliss	Ducati 999 F06	23	37:06.508	2	25
2	1	(Australia) Troy Corser	Suzuki GSX-R1000 K6	23	+0.790	1	20
3	57	(Italy) Lorenzo Lanzi	Ducati 999 F06	23	+15.133	3	16
4	3	(Japan) Norifumi Abe	Yamaha YZF R1	23	+16.004	8	13
5	41	(Japan) Noriyuki Haga	Yamaha YZF R1	23	+16.929	10	11
6	10	(Spain) Fonsi Nieto	Kawasaki ZX 10R	23	+17.056	5	10
7	9	(United Kingdom) Chris Walker	Kawasaki ZX 10R	23	+19.967	7	9
8	55	(France) Régis Laconi	Kawasaki ZX 10R	23	+21.395	6	8
9	88	(Australia) Andrew Pitt	Yamaha YZF R1	23	+21.801	11	7
10	84	(Italy) Michel Fabrizio	Honda CBR1000RR	23	+32.166	18	6
11	52	(United Kingdom) James Toseland	Honda CBR1000RR	23	+32.259	9	5
12	38	(Japan) Shinichi Nakatomi	Yamaha YZF R1	23	+32.355	21	4
13	15	(France) Fabien Foret	Suzuki GSX-R1000 K6	23	+32.648	14	3
14	4	(Brazil) Alex Barros	Honda CBR1000RR	23	+33.875	16	2
15	99	(Australia) Steve Martin	Petronas FP1	23	+38.052	4	1
16	44	(Italy) Roberto Rolfo	Ducati 999 F05	23	+40.284	15	
17	20	(Italy) Marco Borciani	Ducati 999 F05	23	+44.877	20	
18	76	(Germany) Max Neukirchner	Ducati 999 RS	23	+49.267	17	
19	33	(Spain) José David de Gea	Honda CBR1000RR	23	+51.754	19	
20	200	(Italy) Giovanni Bussei	Honda CBR1000RR	23	+56.747	26	
21	116	(Italy) Franco Battaini	Kawasaki ZX 10R	23	+1:01.652	29	
22	66	(Italy) Norino Brignola	Ducati 999 RS	23	+1:11.288	25	
23	69	(Italy) Gianluca Nannelli	Honda CBR1000RR	23	+1:12.297	23	
24	34	(Spain) Josep Monge	Yamaha YZF R1	23	+1:23.967	30	
25	18	(United Kingdom) Craig Jones	Petronas FP1	23	+1:25.553	27	
26	13	(Italy) Vittorio Iannuzzo	Suzuki GSX-R1000 K6	21	+2 laps	22	
Ret	11	(Spain) Rubén Xaus	Ducati 999 F05	8	Retirement	13	
Ret	71	(Japan) Yukio Kagayama	Suzuki GSX-R1000 K6	7	Retirement	12	
Ret	8	(Italy) Ivan Clementi	Ducati 999 RS	6	Retirement	24	
Ret	35	(Spain) Sergio Fuertes	Suzuki GSX-R1000 K6	6	Retirement	28	
Ret	61	(Italy) Lorenzo Alfonsi	Yamaha YZF R1	4	Retirement	31	
DNS	32	(Spain) Javier del Amor	Honda CBR1000RR		Not started		
DNS	19	(Italy) Lucio Pedercini	Ducati 999 RS		Not started		

=== Supersport race classification ===
Pos	No	Rider	Bike	Laps	Time	Grid	Points
1	16	(France) Sébastien Charpentier	Honda CBR600RR	23		1	25
2	11	(Australia) Kevin Curtain	Yamaha YZF-R6	23	+6.537	2	20
3	3	(Japan) Katsuaki Fujiwara	Honda CBR600RR	23	+9.454	3	16
4	23	(Australia) Broc Parkes	Yamaha YZF-R6	23	+11.750	4	13
5	127	(Denmark) Robbin Harms	Honda CBR600RR	23	+17.007	6	11
6	32	(France) Yoann Tiberio	Honda CBR600RR	23	+19.548	9	10
7	12	(Spain) Javier Forés	Yamaha YZF-R6	23	+22.400	5	9
8	55	(Italy) Massimo Roccoli	Yamaha YZF-R6	23	+22.513	12	8
9	45	(Italy) Gianluca Vizziello	Yamaha YZF-R6	23	+24.708	15	7
10	77	(Netherlands) Barry Veneman	Suzuki GSX-R600	23	+25.317	7	6
11	75	(Australia) Josh Brookes	Ducati 749R	23	+27.194	20	5
12	37	(San Marino) William de Angelis	Honda CBR600RR	23	+31.740	16	4
13	25	(Finland) Tatu Lausletho	Honda CBR600RR	23	+37.082	17	3
14	145	(Belgium) Sébastien Le Grelle	Honda CBR600RR	23	+41.951	19	2
15	27	(United Kingdom) Tom Tunstall	Honda CBR600RR	23	+42.816	23	1
16	38	(France) Grégory Leblanc	Honda CBR600RR	23	+48.139	28	
17	8	(France) Maxime Berger	Kawasaki ZX-6R	23	+48.715	24	
18	121	(Italy) Alessio Aldrovandi	Honda CBR600RR	23	+55.319	21	
19	5	(Italy) Alessio Velini	Yamaha YZF-R6	23	+55.964	32	
20	17	(Portugal) Miguel Praia	Honda CBR600RR	23	+59.054	30	
21	21	(Canada) Chris Peris	Yamaha YZF-R6	23	+1:06.039	29	
22	58	(Czech Republic) Tomáš Mikšovský	Honda CBR600RR	23	+1:11.403	31	
23	60	(Russia) Vladimir Ivanov	Yamaha YZF-R6	23	+1:36.670	35	
24	57	(Slovenia) Luka Nedog	Ducati 749R	23	+1:36.993	37	
Ret	6	(Italy) Mauro Sanchini	Yamaha YZF-R6	16	Retirement	27	
Ret	68	(Spain) David Forner García	Yamaha YZF-R6	13	Retirement	33	
Ret	15	(Italy) Andrea Berta	Yamaha YZF-R6	12	Retirement	36	
Ret	41	(United States) Kenny Noyes	Yamaha YZF-R6	11	Retirement	18	
Ret	22	(Norway) Kai Børre Andersen	Suzuki GSX-R600	9	Retirement	11	
Ret	116	(Sweden) Johan Stigefelt	Honda CBR600RR	7	Retirement	13	
Ret	73	(Austria) Christian Zaiser	Ducati 749R	4	Retirement	14	
Ret	54	(Turkey) Kenan Sofuoğlu	Honda CBR600RR	3	Retirement	8	
Ret	7	(France) Stéphane Chambon	Kawasaki ZX-6R	3	Retirement	25	
Ret	88	(France) Julien Enjolras	Yamaha YZF-R6	0	Retirement	22	
Ret	33	(Spain) Victor Carrasco	Honda CBR600RR	0	Retirement	34	
DSQ	35	(Spain) Jordi Torres	Yamaha YZF-R6	23	Disqualified	10	

== Superstock 1000 race classification ==
Pos.	No.	Rider	Bike	Laps	Time/Retired	Grid	Points
1	53	(Italy) Alessandro Polita	Suzuki GSX-R1000 K6	13	22:04.712	3	25
2	36	(Spain) Iván Silva	Kawasaki ZX-10R	13	+0.303	1	20
3	86	(Italy) Ayrton Badovini	MV Agusta F4 1000 R	13	+3.751	4	16
4	16	(Spain) Enrique Rocamora	Yamaha YZF-R1	13	+5.418	5	13
5	9	(Italy) Luca Scassa	MV Agusta F4 1000 R	13	+5.729	2	11
6	11	(Italy) Denis Sacchetti	Kawasaki ZX-10R	13	+9.290	7	10
7	32	(France) Sheridan Morais	Suzuki GSX-R1000 K6	13	+9.409	9	9
8	77	(Italy) Claudio Corti	Yamaha YZF-R1	13	+10.143	12	8
9	42	(Spain) Alex Martinez	Kawasaki ZX-10R	13	+10.149	6	7
10	73	(Italy) Simone Saltarelli	Kawasaki ZX-10R	13	+13.128	11	6
11	15	(Italy) Matteo Baiocco	Yamaha YZF-R1	13	+18.002	13	5
12	47	(United Kingdom) Richard Cooper	Honda CBR1000RR	13	+25.076	19	4
13	99	(Italy) Danilo Dell'Omo	Suzuki GSX-R1000 K6	13	+27.910	15	3
14	5	(Italy) Riccardo Chiarello	Kawasaki ZX-10R	13	+29.890	14	2
15	57	(Italy) Ilario Dionisi	Yamaha YZF-R1	13	+29.983	16	1
16	41	(Australia) Nick Henderson	Suzuki GSX-R1000 K6	13	+43.870	24	
17	17	(France) Cédric Tangre	Suzuki GSX-R1000 K6	13	+48.156	25	
18	44	(Italy) Roberto Lunadei	Yamaha YZF-R1	13	+53.594	27	
19	24	(Slovenia) Marko Jerman	Suzuki GSX-R1000 K6	13	+55.866	26	
20	12	(Germany) Leonardo Biliotti	MV Agusta F4 1000 R	13	+57.565	30	
21	37	(Spain) Javier Oliver	Yamaha YZF-R1	13	+57.875	23	
22	35	(Netherlands) Allard Kerkhoven	Suzuki GSX-R1000 K6	13	+1:07.168	33	
23	14	(Italy) Mauro Belliero	Honda CBR1000RR	13	+1:08.336	31	
24	55	(Belgium) Olivier Depoorter	Yamaha YZF-R1	13	+1:15.611	28	
25	69	(France) David Fouloy	Suzuki GSX-R1000 K6	13	+1:16.070	22	
26	10	(Italy) Giuseppe Natalini	Yamaha YZF-R1	13	+1:22.046	34	
27	28	(Belgium) Sepp Vermonden	Suzuki GSX-R1000 K6	13	+1:23.182	17	
28	18	(Belgium) Eric Van Bael	Suzuki GSX-R1000 K6	13	+1:26.052	36	
29	95	(Qatar) Mashel Al Naimi	Kawasaki ZX-10R	12	+1 lap	35	
Ret	8	(France) Loïc Napoleone	Suzuki GSX-R1000 K6	11	Retirement	10	
Ret	31	(Italy) Giuseppe Barone	MV Agusta F4 1000 R	11	Retirement	29	
Ret	71	(Norway) Petter Solli	Yamaha YZF-R1	8	Retirement	21	
Ret	96	(Czech Republic) Matěj Smrž	Honda CBR1000RR	6	Accident	8	
Ret	40	(Switzerland) Hervé Gantner	Yamaha YZF-R1	6	Retirement	20	
Ret	21	(Netherlands) Leon Bovee	Suzuki GSX-R1000 K6	6	Retirement	32	
Ret	34	(Republic of Ireland) Mark Pollock	Suzuki GSX-R1000 K6	4	Accident	18	
DNS	45	(Italy) Gianluca Rapicavoli	MV Agusta F4 1000 R	0	Did not start	37	
DNS	82	(Italy) Giuseppe Cedroni	Honda CBR1000RR		Did not start		

== Superstock 600 race classification ==
Pos.	No.	Rider	Bike	Laps	Time/Retired	Grid	Points
1	19	(Belgium) Xavier Simeon	Suzuki GSX-R600R	11	18:59.468	1	25
2	59	(Italy) Niccolò Canepa	Ducati 749R	11	+5.192	2	20
3	22	(Spain) Santiago Barragán	Yamaha YZF-R6	11	+8.319	3	16
4	23	(Spain) Josep Pedro	Yamaha YZF-R6	11	+11.021	9	13
5	27	(Spain) Francesc Gamell	Yamaha YZF-R6	11	+12.802	19	11
6	10	(Italy) Davide Giugliano	Kawasaki ZX-6R	11	+14.227	10	10
7	30	(Switzerland) Michaël Savary	Yamaha YZF-R6	11	+22.975	20	9
8	56	(Switzerland) Daniel Sutter	Honda CBR600RR	11	+23.244	22	8
9	99	(Netherlands) Roy Ten Napel	Yamaha YZF-R6	11	+24.073	13	7
10	69	(Czech Republic) Ondřej Ježek	Kawasaki ZX-6R	11	+25.011	21	6
11	89	(Italy) Domenico Colucci	Ducati 749R	11	+31.769	17	5
12	37	(Poland) Andrzej Chmielewski	Yamaha YZF-R6	11	+32.057	27	4
13	24	(Italy) Daniele Beretta	Suzuki GSX-R600R	11	+34.136	28	3
14	18	(United Kingdom) Matt Bond	Suzuki GSX-R600R	11	+35.586	26	2
15	8	(Italy) Andrea Antonelli	Honda CBR600RR	11	+38.807	4	1
16	47	(Italy) Eddi La Marra	Yamaha YZF-R6	11	+41.150	25	
17	199	(United Kingdom) Gregg Black	Honda CBR600RR	11	+42.100	16	
18	41	(Switzerland) Gregory Junod	Suzuki GSX-R600R	11	+43.104	29	
19	26	(United States) Will Gruy	Yamaha YZF-R6	11	+48.226	33	
20	44	(Italy) Cristiano Erbacci	Yamaha YZF-R6	11	+52.073	32	
21	28	(Spain) Yannick Guerra	Yamaha YZF-R6	11	+54.103	30	
22	20	(Czech Republic) Jan Prudik	Honda CBR600RR	11	+54.507	34	
23	32	(Italy) Robert Gianfardoni	Yamaha YZF-R6	11	+1:06.626	36	
24	7	(Italy) Renato Costantini	Honda CBR600RR	11	+1:07.059	5	
25	34	(Sweden) Alexander Lundh	Honda CBR600RR	11	+1:15.839	18	
26	55	(Belgium) Vincent Lonbois	Suzuki GSX-R600R	11	+1:39.370	37	
Ret	196	(Italy) Jonathan Gallina	Yamaha YZF-R6	9	Retirement	23	
Ret	88	(Norway) Mads Odin Hodt	Yamaha YZF-R6	9	Retirement	12	
Ret	96	(Netherlands) Marcel Van Nieuwenhuizen	Suzuki GSX-R600R	4	Accident	24	
Ret	84	(Slovenia) Boštjan Pintar	Yamaha YZF-R6	3	Retirement	15	
Ret	14	(France) Mathieu Gines	Yamaha YZF-R6	2	Accident	6	
Ret	77	(United Kingdom) Barry Burrell	Honda CBR600RR	1	Retirement	31	
Ret	16	(United Kingdom) Christopher Northover	Suzuki GSX-R600R	1	Retirement	35	
Ret	33	(Italy) Alessandro Colatosti	Kawasaki ZX-6R	0	Accident	8	
Ret	31	(Netherlands) Lennart Van Houwelingen	Suzuki GSX-R600R	0	Accident	14	
Ret	21	(France) Franck Millet	Yamaha YZF-R6	0	Retirement	11	
DNS	79	(Brazil) Luiz Carlos	Yamaha YZF-R6	0	Did not start	7	
