= 2006 Eurospeedway Lausitz Superbike World Championship round =

(Germany) 2006 EuroSpeedway Lausitz Superbike World Championship round
Round details
- Round 10 of 12 rounds in the 2006 Superbike World Championship. and Round 10 of 12 rounds in the 2006 Supersport World Championship.
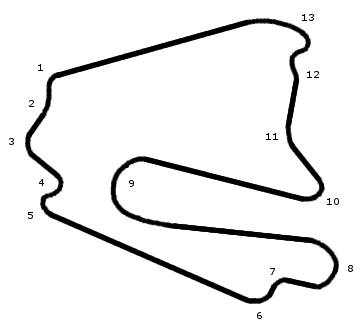
- Date: September 10, 2006
- Location: EuroSpeedway Lausitz
- Course: Permanent racing facility 4.265 km (2.650 mi)

Superbike World Championship
Pole position
(Australia) Troy Bayliss
1:37.923
| Fastest lap race 1 | Fastest lap race 2 |
| (Australia) Troy Bayliss | (Japan) Yukio Kagayama |
| 1:38.635 | 1:39.155 |

Supersport World Championship
Pole position
(Australia) Kevin Curtain
1:41.006
Fastest lap
(Turkey) Kenan Sofuoğlu
1:42.090

The 2006 Eurospeedway Lausitz Superbike World Championship round was the tenth round of the 2006 Superbike World Championship. It took place on the weekend of September 8–10, 2006 at the EuroSpeedway Lausitz.

== Results ==
=== Superbike race 1 classification ===
| Pos | No | Rider | Bike | Laps | Time | Grid | Points |
|---|---|---|---|---|---|---|---|
| 1 | 71 | (Japan) Yukio Kagayama | Suzuki GSX-R1000 K6 | 24 | 39:57.421 | 8 | 25 |
| 2 | 41 | (Japan) Noriyuki Haga | Yamaha YZF R1 | 24 | +1.239 | 2 | 20 |
| 3 | 1 | (Australia) Troy Corser | Suzuki GSX-R1000 K6 | 24 | +1.436 | 6 | 16 |
| 4 | 88 | (Australia) Andrew Pitt | Yamaha YZF R1 | 24 | +8.725 | 4 | 13 |
| 5 | 4 | (Brazil) Alex Barros | Honda CBR1000RR | 24 | +8.975 | 7 | 11 |
| 6 | 31 | (Australia) Karl Muggeridge | Honda CBR1000RR | 24 | +13.804 | 9 | 10 |
| 7 | 21 | (Australia) Troy Bayliss | Ducati 999 F06 | 24 | +23.569 | 1 | 9 |
| 8 | 57 | (Italy) Lorenzo Lanzi | Ducati 999 F06 | 24 | +23.846 | 5 | 8 |
| 9 | 52 | (United Kingdom) James Toseland | Honda CBR1000RR | 24 | +27.217 | 3 | 7 |
| 10 | 10 | (Spain) Fonsi Nieto | Kawasaki ZX 10R | 24 | +28.712 | 11 | 6 |
| 11 | 9 | (United Kingdom) Chris Walker | Kawasaki ZX 10R | 24 | +29.543 | 14 | 5 |
| 12 | 55 | (France) Régis Laconi | Kawasaki ZX 10R | 24 | +29.869 | 12 | 4 |
| 13 | 76 | (Germany) Max Neukirchner | Suzuki GSX-R1000 K6 | 24 | +31.275 | 13 | 3 |
| 14 | 99 | (Australia) Steve Martin | Petronas FP1 | 24 | +34.783 | 10 | 2 |
| 15 | 11 | (Spain) Rubén Xaus | Ducati 999 F05 | 24 | +37.010 | 15 | 1 |
| 16 | 3 | (Japan) Norifumi Abe | Yamaha YZF R1 | 24 | +46.339 | 17 | |
| 17 | 38 | (Japan) Shinichi Nakatomi | Yamaha YZF R1 | 24 | +58.227 | 25 | |
| 18 | 18 | (United Kingdom) Craig Jones | Petronas FP1 | 24 | +59.299 | 21 | |
| 19 | 80 | (United States) Kurtis Roberts | Ducati 999 RS | 24 | +1:12.867 | 26 | |
| 20 | 25 | (Australia) Josh Brookes | Kawasaki ZX 10R | 24 | +1:16.778 | 28 | |
| 21 | 83 | (Belgium) Didier Van Keymeulen | Yamaha YZF R1 | 24 | +1:20.656 | 20 | |
| Ret | 44 | (Italy) Roberto Rolfo | Ducati 999 F05 | 23 | Retirement | 27 | |
| Ret | 36 | (Czech Republic) Jiří Dražďák | Yamaha YZF R1 | 19 | Retirement | 29 | |
| Ret | 84 | (Italy) Michel Fabrizio | Honda CBR1000RR | 15 | Retirement | 16 | |
| Ret | 26 | (Germany) Stefan Nebel | Kawasaki ZX 10R | 13 | Retirement | 22 | |
| Ret | 20 | (Italy) Marco Borciani | Ducati 999 F05 | 9 | Retirement | 19 | |
| Ret | 13 | (Italy) Vittorio Iannuzzo | Suzuki GSX-R1000 K6 | 7 | Retirement | 23 | |
| Ret | 7 | (Italy) Pierfrancesco Chili | Honda CBR1000RR | 6 | Retirement | 24 | |
| Ret | 8 | (Italy) Ivan Clementi | Ducati 999 RS | 0 | Retirement | 18 | |

=== Superbike race 2 classification ===
| Pos | No | Rider | Bike | Laps | Time | Grid | Points |
|---|---|---|---|---|---|---|---|
| 1 | 52 | (United Kingdom) James Toseland | Honda CBR1000RR | 24 | 39:58.796 | 3 | 25 |
| 2 | 41 | (Japan) Noriyuki Haga | Yamaha YZF R1 | 24 | +0.210 | 2 | 20 |
| 3 | 21 | (Australia) Troy Bayliss | Ducati 999 F06 | 24 | +3.056 | 1 | 16 |
| 4 | 71 | (Japan) Yukio Kagayama | Suzuki GSX-R1000 K6 | 24 | +7.396 | 8 | 13 |
| 5 | 31 | (Australia) Karl Muggeridge | Honda CBR1000RR | 24 | +11.653 | 9 | 11 |
| 6 | 57 | (Italy) Lorenzo Lanzi | Ducati 999 F06 | 24 | +21.386 | 5 | 10 |
| 7 | 10 | (Spain) Fonsi Nieto | Kawasaki ZX 10R | 24 | +26.620 | 11 | 9 |
| 8 | 84 | (Italy) Michel Fabrizio | Honda CBR1000RR | 24 | +26.736 | 16 | 8 |
| 9 | 11 | (Spain) Rubén Xaus | Ducati 999 F05 | 24 | +29.428 | 15 | 7 |
| 10 | 9 | (United Kingdom) Chris Walker | Kawasaki ZX 10R | 24 | +29.544 | 14 | 6 |
| 11 | 3 | (Japan) Norifumi Abe | Yamaha YZF R1 | 24 | +29.779 | 17 | 5 |
| 12 | 99 | (Australia) Steve Martin | Petronas FP1 | 24 | +38.463 | 10 | 4 |
| 13 | 18 | (United Kingdom) Craig Jones | Petronas FP1 | 24 | +45.259 | 21 | 3 |
| 14 | 1 | (Australia) Troy Corser | Suzuki GSX-R1000 K6 | 24 | +45.922 | 6 | 2 |
| 15 | 38 | (Japan) Shinichi Nakatomi | Yamaha YZF R1 | 24 | +58.393 | 25 | 1 |
| 16 | 13 | (Italy) Vittorio Iannuzzo | Suzuki GSX-R1000 K6 | 24 | +58.633 | 23 | |
| 17 | 44 | (Italy) Roberto Rolfo | Ducati 999 F05 | 24 | +1:00.033 | 27 | |
| 18 | 8 | (Italy) Ivan Clementi | Ducati 999 RS | 24 | +1:04.858 | 18 | |
| 19 | 55 | (France) Régis Laconi | Kawasaki ZX 10R | 24 | +1:05.825 | 12 | |
| 20 | 26 | (Germany) Stefan Nebel | Kawasaki ZX 10R | 24 | +1:06.149 | 22 | |
| 21 | 83 | (Belgium) Didier Van Keymeulen | Yamaha YZF R1 | 24 | +1:08.295 | 20 | |
| 22 | 36 | (Czech Republic) Jiří Dražďák | Yamaha YZF R1 | 24 | +1:26.916 | 29 | |
| 23 | 25 | (Australia) Josh Brookes | Kawasaki ZX 10R | 23 | +1 Lap | 28 | |
| Ret | 4 | (Brazil) Alex Barros | Honda CBR1000RR | 18 | Retirement | 7 | |
| Ret | 80 | (United States) Kurtis Roberts | Ducati 999 RS | 11 | Retirement | 26 | |
| Ret | 7 | (Italy) Pierfrancesco Chili | Honda CBR1000RR | 5 | Retirement | 24 | |
| Ret | 88 | (Australia) Andrew Pitt | Yamaha YZF R1 | 3 | Retirement | 4 | |
| Ret | 76 | (Germany) Max Neukirchner | Suzuki GSX-R1000 K6 | 2 | Retirement | 13 | |
| DNS | 20 | (Italy) Marco Borciani | Ducati 999 F05 | | Injured in race 1 | 19 | |

=== Supersport race classification ===
| Pos | No | Rider | Bike | Laps | Time | Grid | Points |
|---|---|---|---|---|---|---|---|
| 1 | 54 | (Turkey) Kenan Sofuoğlu | Honda CBR600RR | 23 | 39:29.009 | 2 | 25 |
| 2 | 11 | (Australia) Kevin Curtain | Yamaha YZF-R6 | 23 | +0.130 | 1 | 20 |
| 3 | 10 | (France) Fabien Foret | Yamaha YZF-R6 | 23 | +9.654 | 8 | 16 |
| 4 | 127 | (Denmark) Robbin Harms | Honda CBR600RR | 23 | +10.564 | 13 | 13 |
| 5 | 69 | (Italy) Gianluca Nannelli | Ducati 749R | 23 | +19.925 | 6 | 11 |
| 6 | 45 | (Italy) Gianluca Vizziello | Yamaha YZF-R6 | 23 | +24.288 | 7 | 10 |
| 7 | 73 | (Austria) Christian Zaiser | Ducati 749R | 23 | +24.980 | 3 | 9 |
| 8 | 22 | (Norway) Kai Børre Andersen | Suzuki GSX-R600 | 23 | +25.058 | 11 | 8 |
| 9 | 18 | (France) Matthieu Lagrive | Honda CBR600RR | 23 | +30.289 | 15 | 7 |
| 10 | 7 | (France) Stéphane Chambon | Kawasaki ZX-6R | 23 | +34.854 | 9 | 6 |
| 11 | 72 | (United Kingdom) Stuart Easton | Ducati 749R | 23 | +35.811 | 22 | 5 |
| 12 | 55 | (Italy) Massimo Roccoli | Yamaha YZF-R6 | 23 | +36.092 | 17 | 4 |
| 13 | 6 | (Italy) Mauro Sanchini | Yamaha YZF-R6 | 23 | +36.430 | 24 | 3 |
| 14 | 21 | (Canada) Chris Peris | Yamaha YZF-R6 | 23 | +36.845 | 20 | 2 |
| 15 | 25 | (Finland) Tatu Lauslehto | Honda CBR600RR | 23 | +1:00.846 | 19 | 1 |
| 16 | 60 | (Russia) Vladimir Ivanov | Yamaha YZF-R6 | 23 | +1:07.040 | 26 | |
| 17 | 31 | (Finland) Vesa Kallio | Yamaha YZF-R6 | 23 | +1:07.258 | 23 | |
| 18 | 17 | (Portugal) Miguel Praia | Honda CBR600RR | 23 | +1:10.978 | 27 | |
| 19 | 38 | (France) Grégory Leblanc | Honda CBR600RR | 23 | +1:11.430 | 25 | |
| 20 | 63 | (Italy) Lorenzo Alfonsi | Yamaha YZF-R6 | 23 | +1:11.718 | 31 | |
| 21 | 67 | (Austria) Günther Knobloch | Yamaha YZF-R6 | 23 | +1:32.063 | 32 | |
| 22 | 3 | (Japan) Katsuaki Fujiwara | Honda CBR600RR | 21 | +2 lap | 10 | |
| 23 | 27 | (United Kingdom) Tom Tunstall | Honda CBR600RR | 21 | +2 lap | 29 | |
| Ret | 37 | (San Marino) William De Angelis | Honda CBR600RR | 21 | Retirement | 14 | |
| Ret | 121 | (Italy) Alessio Aldrovandi | Honda CBR600RR | 19 | Retirement | 34 | |
| Ret | 5 | (Italy) Alessio Velini | Yamaha YZF-R6 | 17 | Retirement | 28 | |
| Ret | 32 | (France) Yoann Tiberio | Honda CBR600RR | 16 | Retirement | 12 | |
| Ret | 145 | (Belgium) Sébastien Le Grelle | Honda CBR600RR | 13 | Retirement | 30 | |
| Ret | 116 | (Sweden) Johan Stigefelt | Honda CBR600RR | 12 | Accident | 5 | |
| Ret | 15 | (Italy) Andrea Berta | Yamaha YZF-R6 | 11 | Accident | 35 | |
| Ret | 94 | (Spain) David Checa | Yamaha YZF-R6 | 8 | Retirement | 16 | |
| Ret | 57 | (Slovenia) Luka Nedog | Ducati 749R | 8 | Technical problem | 33 | |
| Ret | 16 | (France) Sébastien Charpentier | Honda CBR600RR | 8 | Retirement | 4 | |
| Ret | 8 | (France) Maxime Berger | Kawasaki ZX-6R | 4 | Accident | 18 | |
| Ret | 88 | (France) Julien Enjolras | Yamaha YZF-R6 | 0 | Accident | 21 | |
| DNS | 77 | (Netherlands) Barry Veneman | Suzuki GSX-R600 | | Did not start | | |

== Superstock 1000 race classification ==
| Pos. | No. | Rider | Bike | Laps | Time/Retired | Grid | Points |
|---|---|---|---|---|---|---|---|
| 1 | 77 | (Italy) Claudio Corti | Yamaha YZF-R1 | 9 | 15:39.363 | 1 | 25 |
| 2 | 26 | (Australia) Brendan Roberts | Suzuki GSX-R1000 K6 | 9 | +1.082 | 4 | 20 |
| 3 | 8 | (France) Loïc Napoleone | Suzuki GSX-R1000 K6 | 9 | +4.486 | 8 | 16 |
| 4 | 51 | (Germany) Dominic Lammert | Suzuki GSX-R1000 K6 | 9 | +4.631 | 6 | 13 |
| 5 | 9 | (Italy) Luca Scassa | MV Agusta F4 1000 R | 9 | +4.943 | 2 | 11 |
| 6 | 44 | (Italy) Roberto Lunadei | Yamaha YZF-R1 | 9 | +13.107 | 11 | 10 |
| 7 | 15 | (Italy) Matteo Baiocco | Yamaha YZF-R1 | 9 | +13.273 | 13 | 9 |
| 8 | 99 | (Italy) Danilo Dell'Omo | Suzuki GSX-R1000 K6 | 9 | +13.404 | 5 | 8 |
| 9 | 47 | (United Kingdom) Richard Cooper | Honda CBR1000RR | 9 | +14.004 | 12 | 7 |
| 10 | 53 | (Italy) Alessandro Polita | Suzuki GSX-R1000 K6 | 9 | +14.763 | 9 | 6 |
| 11 | 24 | (Slovenia) Marko Jerman | Suzuki GSX-R1000 K6 | 9 | +16.773 | 18 | 5 |
| 12 | 40 | (Switzerland) Hervé Gantner | Honda CBR1000RR | 9 | +19.372 | 15 | 4 |
| 13 | 16 | (Spain) Enrique Rocamora | Yamaha YZF-R1 | 9 | +20.271 | 14 | 3 |
| 14 | 38 | (Italy) Gilles Boccolini | Kawasaki ZX-10R | 9 | +21.320 | 7 | 2 |
| 15 | 5 | (Italy) Riccardo Chiarello | Kawasaki ZX-10R | 9 | +27.726 | 17 | 1 |
| 16 | 32 | (South Africa) Sheridan Morais | Suzuki GSX-R1000 K6 | 9 | +28.343 | 16 | |
| 17 | 90 | (Italy) Diego Ciavattini | Yamaha YZF-R1 | 9 | +29.037 | 22 | |
| 18 | 55 | (Belgium) Olivier Depoorter | Yamaha YZF-R1 | 9 | +29.297 | 24 | |
| 19 | 73 | (Italy) Simone Saltarelli | Yamaha YZF-R1 | 9 | +29.583 | 21 | |
| 20 | 12 | (Germany) Leonardo Biliotti | MV Agusta F4 1000 R | 9 | +33.786 | 19 | |
| 21 | 21 | (Netherlands) Leon Bovee | Suzuki GSX-R1000 K6 | 9 | +38.105 | 26 | |
| 22 | 27 | (Italy) Alessandro Colatosti | Kawasaki ZX-10R | 9 | +42.866 | 29 | |
| 23 | 89 | (Switzerland) Raphael Chevre | Suzuki GSX-R1000 K6 | 9 | +43.688 | 27 | |
| 24 | 35 | (Netherlands) Allard Kerkhoven | Suzuki GSX-R1000 K6 | 9 | +45.241 | 30 | |
| 25 | 31 | (Italy) Giuseppe Barone | Suzuki GSX-R1000 K6 | 9 | +35.381 | 28 | |
| 26 | 64 | (Belgium) Didier Heyndrickx | Suzuki GSX-R1000 K6 | 9 | +52.495 | 32 | |
| 27 | 14 | (Italy) Mauro Belliero | Honda CBR1000RR | 9 | +53.813 | 31 | |
| 28 | 33 | (United Kingdom) Patrick McDougall | Suzuki GSX-R1000 K6 | 9 | +1:12.437 | 25 | |
| Ret | 86 | (Italy) Ayrton Badovini | MV Agusta F4 1000 R | 5 | Accident | 3 | |
| Ret | 71 | (Norway) Petter Solli | Yamaha YZF-R1 | 5 | Retirement | 23 | |
| Ret | 96 | (Czech Republic) Matěj Smrž | Honda CBR1000RR | 4 | Accident | 20 | |
| DNS | 57 | (Italy) Ilario Dionisi | MV Agusta F4 1000 R | 0 | Did not start | 10 | |
| DNQ | 34 | (Republic of Ireland) Mark Pollock | Suzuki GSX-R1000 K6 | | Did not qualify | | |
| DNQ | 58 | (Italy) Robert Gianfardoni | Yamaha YZF-R1 | | Did not qualify | | |
| DNQ | 18 | (Belgium) Eric Van Bael | Suzuki GSX-R1000 K6 | | Did not qualify | | |
| WD | 17 | (France) Cédric Tangre | Suzuki GSX-R1000 K6 | | Withdrew | | |
| WD | 20 | (Italy) Fabrizio Perotti | Kawasaki ZX-10R | | Withdrew | | |

== Superstock 600 race classification ==
| Pos. | No. | Rider | Bike | Laps | Time/Retired | Grid | Points |
|---|---|---|---|---|---|---|---|
| 1 | 59 | (Italy) Niccolò Canepa | Ducati 749R | 12 | 21:21.876 | 1 | 25 |
| 2 | 10 | (Italy) Davide Giugliano | Kawasaki ZX-6R | 12 | +0.433 | 2 | 20 |
| 3 | 19 | (Belgium) Xavier Simeon | Suzuki GSX-R600 | 12 | +0.704 | 3 | 16 |
| 4 | 89 | (Italy) Domenico Colucci | Ducati 749R | 12 | +32.101 | 8 | 13 |
| 5 | 34 | (Sweden) Alexander Lundh | Honda CBR600RR | 12 | +32.792 | 6 | 11 |
| 6 | 69 | (Czech Republic) Ondřej Ježek | Kawasaki ZX-6R | 12 | +32.906 | 10 | 10 |
| 7 | 99 | (Netherlands) Roy Ten Napel | Yamaha YZF-R6 | 12 | +35.605 | 4 | 9 |
| 8 | 7 | (Italy) Renato Costantini | Honda CBR600RR | 12 | +35.616 | 16 | 8 |
| 9 | 37 | (Poland) Andrzej Chmielewski | Yamaha YZF-R6 | 12 | +36.366 | 11 | 7 |
| 10 | 56 | (Switzerland) Daniel Sutter | Honda CBR600RR | 12 | +36.769 | 14 | 6 |
| 11 | 75 | (Germany) Dennis Sigloch | Yamaha YZF-R6 | 12 | +40.607 | 15 | 5 |
| 12 | 21 | (France) Franck Millet | Yamaha YZF-R6 | 12 | +41.121 | 13 | 4 |
| 13 | 88 | (Norway) Mads Odin Hodt | Yamaha YZF-R6 | 12 | +43.862 | 18 | 3 |
| 14 | 84 | (Slovenia) Boštjan Pintar | Yamaha YZF-R6 | 12 | +43.978 | 17 | 2 |
| 15 | 77 | (United Kingdom) Barry Burrell | Honda CBR600RR | 12 | +44.418 | 25 | 1 |
| 16 | 24 | (Italy) Daniele Beretta | Suzuki GSX-R600 | 12 | +45.117 | 9 | |
| 17 | 74 | (France) Sylvain Barrier | Yamaha YZF-R6 | 12 | +48.963 | 20 | |
| 18 | 18 | (United Kingdom) Matt Bond | Suzuki GSX-R600 | 12 | +49.560 | 26 | |
| 19 | 63 | (Italy) Patrizio Valsecchi | Yamaha YZF-R6 | 12 | +49.700 | 21 | |
| 20 | 41 | (Switzerland) Gregory Junod | Suzuki GSX-R600 | 12 | +53.603 | 7 | |
| 21 | 16 | (United Kingdom) Christopher Northover | Suzuki GSX-R600 | 12 | +56.301 | 30 | |
| 22 | 46 | (United Kingdom) Leon Hunt | Yamaha YZF-R6 | 12 | +1:00.474 | 29 | |
| 23 | 31 | (Netherlands) Lennart Van Houwelingen | Suzuki GSX-R600 | 12 | +1:11.375 | 28 | |
| 24 | 30 | (Switzerland) Michaël Savary | Yamaha YZF-R6 | 12 | +1:14.473 | 12 | |
| 25 | 28 | (Spain) Yannick Guerra | Yamaha YZF-R6 | 12 | +1:14.729 | 32 | |
| 26 | 25 | (Czech Republic) Patrik Vostárek | Honda CBR600RR | 12 | +1:39.384 | 24 | |
| 27 | 12 | (Italy) Davide Caldart | Kawasaki ZX-6R | 11 | +1 lap | 33 | |
| Ret | 55 | (Belgium) Vincent Lonbois | Suzuki GSX-R600 | 10 | Accident | 23 | |
| Ret | 26 | (United States) Will Gruy | Yamaha YZF-R6 | 8 | Accident | 27 | |
| Ret | 44 | (Italy) Cristiano Erbacci | Yamaha YZF-R6 | 6 | Retirement | 31 | |
| Ret | 49 | (Italy) Davide Bastianelli | Yamaha YZF-R6 | 5 | Retirement | 19 | |
| Ret | 8 | (Italy) Andrea Antonelli | Honda CBR600RR | 3 | Technichal problem | 5 | |
| DNS | 199 | (United Kingdom) Gregg Black | Honda CBR600RR | 0 | Did not start | 22 | |
