= 2006 Misano Superbike World Championship round =

(San Marino) 2006 Misano Superbike World Championship round
Round details
- Round 6 of 12 rounds in the 2006 Superbike World Championship. and Round 6 of 12 rounds in the 2006 Supersport World Championship.
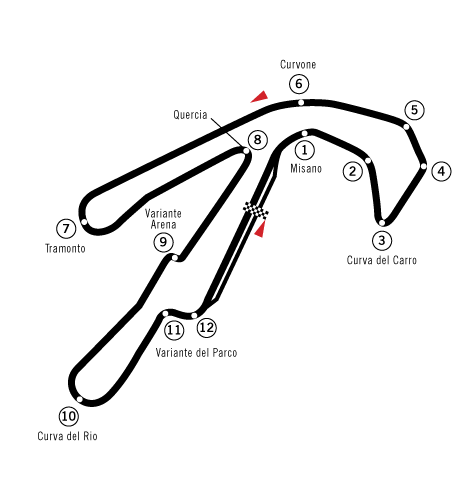
- Date: June 25, 2006
- Location: Misano
- Course: Permanent racing facility 4.060 km (2.523 mi)

Superbike World Championship
Pole position
(United Kingdom) James Toseland
1:33.833
Fastest lap race 1	Fastest lap race 2
(Australia) Troy Bayliss	(Australia) Andrew Pitt
1:35.185	1:35.123

Supersport World Championship
Pole position
(Australia) Broc Parkes
1:36.876
Fastest lap
(Australia) Broc Parkes
1:37.628

The 2006 Misano Superbike World Championship round was the sixth round of the 2006 Superbike World Championship. It took place on the weekend of June 23–25, 2006 at the Misano Adriatico circuit.

== Results ==
=== Superbike race 1 classification ===
Pos	No	Rider	Bike	Laps	Time	Grid	Points
1	21	(Australia) Troy Bayliss	Ducati 999 F06	25	40:06.480	7	25
2	52	(United Kingdom) James Toseland	Honda CBR1000RR	25	+6.943	1	20
3	71	(Japan) Yukio Kagayama	Suzuki GSX-R1000 K6	25	+10.141	10	16
4	4	(Brazil) Alex Barros	Honda CBR1000RR	25	+15.017	11	13
5	41	(Japan) Noriyuki Haga	Yamaha YZF R1	25	+15.376	6	11
6	55	(France) Régis Laconi	Kawasaki ZX 10R	25	+16.763	9	10
7	57	(Italy) Lorenzo Lanzi	Ducati 999 F06	25	+23.857	8	9
8	10	(Spain) Fonsi Nieto	Kawasaki ZX 10R	25	+34.167	14	8
9	11	(Spain) Rubén Xaus	Ducati 999 F05	25	+35.254	17	7
10	3	(Japan) Norifumi Abe	Yamaha YZF R1	25	+35.335	22	6
11	31	(Australia) Karl Muggeridge	Honda CBR1000RR	25	+39.423	20	5
12	16	(France) Sébastien Gimbert	Yamaha YZF R1	25	+39.609	19	4
13	15	(France) Fabien Foret	Suzuki GSX-R1000 K6	25	+39.755	18	3
14	13	(Italy) Vittorio Iannuzzo	Suzuki GSX-R1000 K6	25	+44.065	27	2
15	44	(Italy) Roberto Rolfo	Ducati 999 F05	25	+48.495	15	1
16	88	(Australia) Andrew Pitt	Yamaha YZF R1	25	+48.587	3	
17	8	(Italy) Ivan Clementi	Ducati 999 RS	25	+50.158	25	
18	25	(Australia) Josh Brookes	Kawasaki ZX 10R	25	+52.883	28	
19	66	(Italy) Norino Brignola	Ducati 999 RS	25	+1:00.319	26	
20	7	(Italy) Pierfrancesco Chili	Honda CBR1000RR	25	+1:13.185	23	
21	18	(United Kingdom) Craig Jones	Petronas FP1	25	+1:15.929	29	
22	105	(Italy) Lorenzo Alfonsi	Ducati 999 RS	25	+1:16.972	30	
Ret	69	(Italy) Gianluca Nannelli	Honda CBR1000RR	17	Retirement	24	
Ret	99	(Australia) Steve Martin	Petronas FP1	16	Retirement	4	
Ret	1	(Australia) Troy Corser	Suzuki GSX-R1000 K6	15	Accident	2	
Ret	9	(United Kingdom) Chris Walker	Kawasaki ZX 10R	12	Retirement	5	
Ret	20	(Italy) Marco Borciani	Ducati 999 F05	12	Retirement	21	
Ret	84	(Italy) Michel Fabrizio	Honda CBR1000RR	7	Accident	12	
Ret	38	(Japan) Shinichi Nakatomi	Yamaha YZF R1	2	Accident	13	
DNS	76	(Germany) Max Neukirchner	Ducati 999 RS		Not started	18	

=== Superbike race 2 classification ===
Pos	No	Rider	Bike	Laps	Time	Grid	Points
1	88	(Australia) Andrew Pitt	Yamaha YZF R1	25	40:18.671	3	25
2	4	(Brazil) Alex Barros	Honda CBR1000RR	25	+2.717	11	20
3	41	(Japan) Noriyuki Haga	Yamaha YZF R1	25	+6.559	6	16
4	9	(United Kingdom) Chris Walker	Kawasaki ZX 10R	25	+7.100	5	13
5	71	(Japan) Yukio Kagayama	Suzuki GSX-R1000 K6	25	+7.276	10	11
6	84	(Italy) Michel Fabrizio	Honda CBR1000RR	25	+13.916	12	10
7	57	(Italy) Lorenzo Lanzi	Ducati 999 F06	25	+14.148	8	9
8	52	(United Kingdom) James Toseland	Honda CBR1000RR	25	+15.065	1	8
9	11	(Spain) Rubén Xaus	Ducati 999 F05	25	+15.434	17	7
10	15	(France) Fabien Foret	Suzuki GSX-R1000 K6	25	+20.579	18	6
11	10	(Spain) Fonsi Nieto	Kawasaki ZX 10R	25	+21.440	14	5
12	21	(Australia) Troy Bayliss	Ducati 999 F06	25	+23.417	7	4
13	3	(Japan) Norifumi Abe	Yamaha YZF R1	25	+25.602	22	3
14	31	(Australia) Karl Muggeridge	Honda CBR1000RR	25	+26.088	20	2
15	44	(Italy) Roberto Rolfo	Ducati 999 F05	25	+26.712	15	1
16	13	(Italy) Vittorio Iannuzzo	Suzuki GSX-R1000 K6	25	+33.556	27	
17	99	(Australia) Steve Martin	Petronas FP1	25	+34.766	4	
18	38	(Japan) Shinichi Nakatomi	Yamaha YZF R1	25	+37.406	13	
19	55	(France) Régis Laconi	Kawasaki ZX 10R	25	+40.146	9	
20	8	(Italy) Ivan Clementi	Ducati 999 RS	25	+47.341	25	
21	18	(United Kingdom) Craig Jones	Petronas FP1	25	+59.560	29	
Ret	20	(Italy) Marco Borciani	Ducati 999 F05	15	Retirement	21	
Ret	66	(Italy) Norino Brignola	Ducati 999 RS	13	Retirement	26	
Ret	69	(Italy) Gianluca Nannelli	Honda CBR1000RR	12	Accident	24	
Ret	105	(Italy) Lorenzo Alfonsi	Ducati 999 RS	11	Retirement	30	
Ret	25	(Australia) Josh Brookes	Kawasaki ZX 10R	10	Accident	28	
Ret	7	(Italy) Pierfrancesco Chili	Honda CBR1000RR	9	Retirement	23	
Ret	1	(Australia) Troy Corser	Suzuki GSX-R1000 K6	7	Accident	2	
Ret	16	(France) Sébastien Gimbert	Yamaha YZF R1	4	Retirement	19	
DNS	76	(Germany) Max Neukirchner	Ducati 999 RS		Not started	18	

=== Supersport race classification ===
Pos	No	Rider	Bike	Laps	Time	Grid	Points
1	55	(Italy) Massimo Roccoli	Yamaha YZF-R6	23	37:55.059	3	25
2	61	(Italy) Simone Sanna	Honda CBR600RR	23	+0.242	2	20
3	23	(Australia) Broc Parkes	Yamaha YZF-R6	23	+4.936	1	16
4	94	(Spain) David Checa	Yamaha YZF-R6	23	+6.492	4	13
5	127	(Denmark) Robin Harms	Honda CBR600RR	23	+9.805	11	11
6	11	(Australia) Kevin Curtain	Yamaha YZF-R6	23	+10.147	14	10
7	45	(Italy) Gianluca Vizziello	Yamaha YZF-R6	23	+13.168	5	9
8	54	(Turkey) Kenan Sofuoğlu	Honda CBR600RR	23	+14.740	9	8
9	116	(Sweden) Johan Stigefelt	Honda CBR600RR	23	+16.107	13	7
10	12	(Spain) Javier Forés	Yamaha YZF-R6	23	+19.665	7	6
11	8	(France) Maxime Berger	Kawasaki ZX-6R	23	+19.835	10	5
12	37	(San Marino) William De Angelis	Honda CBR600RR	23	+24.121	12	4
13	18	(France) Mathieu Lagrive	Honda CBR600RR	23	+24.221	16	3
14	28	(Netherlands) Arie Vos	Honda CBR600RR	23	+25.557	23	2
15	6	(Italy) Mauro Sanchini	Yamaha YZF-R6	23	+26.474	15	1
16	77	(Netherlands) Barry Veneman	Suzuki GSX-R600	23	+27.740	19	
17	76	(Spain) Bernat Martinez	Yamaha YZF-R6	23	+39.390	18	
18	38	(France) Grégory Leblanc	Honda CBR600RR	23	+41.744	25	
19	9	(Italy) Alessio Corradi	Yamaha YZF-R6	23	+48.806	22	
20	25	(Finland) Tatu Lauslehto	Honda CBR600RR	23	+49.145	29	
21	145	(Belgium) Sebastien Le Grelle	Honda CBR600RR	23	+55.007	26	
22	27	(United Kingdom) Tom Tunstall	Honda CBR600RR	23	+55.424	33	
Ret	73	(Austria) Christian Zaiser	Ducati 749R	14	Accident	8	
Ret	68	(Spain) David Forner	Yamaha YZF-R6	12	Accident	34	
Ret	60	(Russia) Vladimir Ivanov	Yamaha YZF-R6	11	Retirement	21	
Ret	88	(France) Julien Enjolras	Yamaha YZF-R6	11	Accident	30	
Ret	26	(Italy) Alessandro Antonello	Kawasaki ZX-6R	10	Accident	17	
Ret	57	(Slovenia) Luka Nedog	Ducati 749R	10	Retirement	32	
Ret	15	(Italy) Andrea Berta	Yamaha YZF-R6	9	Retirement	28	
Ret	5	(Italy) Alessio Velini	Yamaha YZF-R6	8	Retirement	27	
REt	32	(France) Yoann Tiberio	Honda CBR600RR	5	Accident	6	
Ret	99	(Italy) Sebastiano Zerbo	Yamaha YZF-R6	2	Retirement	24	
Ret	17	(Portugal) Miguel Praia	Honda CBR600RR	1	Accident	20	
DNS	7	(France) Stéphane Chambon	Kawasaki ZX-6R	0	Did not start	31	
DNS	121	(Italy) Alessio Aldrovandi	Honda CBR600RR		Did not start		
DNS	20	(Italy) Diego Giugovaz	Yamaha YZF-R6		Did not start		
DNS	72	(United Kingdom) Stuart Easton	Ducati 749R		Did not start		
WD	80	(United States) Kurtis Roberts	Suzuki GSX-R600		Withdrew		

== Superstock 1000 race classification ==
Pos.	No.	Rider	Bike	Laps	Time/Retired	Grid	Points
1	53	(Italy) Alessandro Polita	Suzuki GSX-R1000 K6	15	24:48.301	3	25
2	86	(Italy) Ayrton Badovini	MV Agusta F4 1000 R	15	+6.602	1	20
3	9	(Italy) Luca Scassa	MV Agusta F4 1000 R	15	+9.519	2	16
4	26	(Australia) Brendan Roberts	Suzuki GSX-R1000 K6	15	+10.777	7	13
5	77	(Italy) Claudio Corti	Yamaha YZF-R1	15	+18.127	4	11
6	16	(Spain) Enrique Rocamora	Yamaha YZF-R1	15	+19.192	13	10
7	73	(Italy) Simone Saltarelli	Kawasaki ZX-10R	15	+31.703	18	9
8	96	(Czech Republic) Matěj Smrž	Honda CBR1000RR	15	+31.965	17	8
9	47	(United Kingdom) Richard Cooper	Honda CBR1000RR	15	+32.011	15	7
10	5	(Italy) Riccardo Chiarello	Kawasaki ZX-10R	15	+33.028	8	6
11	42	(Spain) Alex Martinez	Kawasaki ZX-10R	15	+34.306	12	5
12	15	(Italy) Matteo Baiocco	Yamaha YZF-R1	15	+35.749	16	4
13	17	(France) Cédric Tangre	Suzuki GSX-R1000 K6	15	+36.451	19	3
14	24	(Slovenia) Marko Jerman	Suzuki GSX-R1000 K6	15	+37.936	26	2
15	99	(Italy) Danilo Dell'Omo	Suzuki GSX-R1000 K6	15	+43.021	6	1
16	10	(Italy) Giuseppe Natalini	Yamaha YZF-R1	15	+52.125	29	
17	55	(Belgium) Olivier Depoorter	Yamaha YZF-R1	15	+53.986	31	
18	39	(Italy) Mattia Angeloni	Yamaha YZF-R1	15	+56.408	28	
19	41	(Australia) Nick Henderson	Suzuki GSX-R1000 K6	15	+57.189	24	
20	12	(Germany) Leonardo Biliotti	MV Agusta F4 1000 R	15	+59.111	20	
21	90	(Italy) Diego Ciavattini	Yamaha YZF-R1	15	+1:00.742	23	
22	35	(Netherlands) Allard Kerkhoven	Suzuki GSX-R1000 K6	15	+1:02.879	32	
23	14	(Italy) Mauro Belliero	Honda CBR1000RR	15	+1:02.897	30	
24	18	(Belgium) Eric Van Bael	Suzuki GSX-R1000 K6	15	+1:39.606	34	
Ret	28	(Belgium) Sepp Vermonden	Suzuki GSX-R1000 K6	14	Retirement	21	
Ret	154	(Italy) Tommaso Lorenzetti	Honda CBR1000RR	13	Accident	11	
Ret	11	(Italy) Denis Sacchetti	Kawasaki ZX-10R	13	Retirement	9	
Ret	34	(Republic of Ireland) Mark Pollock	Suzuki GSX-R1000 K6	12	Accident	25	
Ret	45	(Italy) Gianluca Rapicavoli	MV Agusta F4 1000 R	9	Retirement	27	
Ret	8	(France) Loïc Napoleone	Suzuki GSX-R1000 K6	6	Accident	5	
Ret	44	(Italy) Roberto Lunadei	Yamaha YZF-R1	4	Accident	10	
Ret	32	(South Africa) Sheridan Morais	Suzuki GSX-R1000 K6	4	Accident	14	
Ret	82	(Italy) Giuseppe Cedroni	Honda CBR1000RR	3	Accident	33	
DNS	71	(Norway) Petter Solli	Yamaha YZF-R1	0	Did not start	22	
WD	69	(France) David Fouloy	Suzuki GSX-R1000 K6		Withdrew		
WD	40	(Switzerland) Hervé Gantner	Yamaha YZF-R1		Withdrew		
WD	21	(Netherlands) Leon Bovee	Suzuki GSX-R1000 K6		Withdrew		

== Superstock 600 race classification ==
Pos.	No.	Rider	Bike	Laps	Time/Retired	Grid	Points
1	10	(Italy) Davide Giugliano	Kawasaki ZX-6R	10	17:16.347	3	25
2	19	(Belgium) Xavier Simeon	Suzuki GSX-R600	10	+0.005	2	20
3	59	(Italy) Niccolò Canepa	Ducati 749R	10	+0.760	1	16
4	47	(Italy) Eddi La Marra	Yamaha YZF-R6	10	+2.040	7	13
5	8	(Italy) Andrea Antonelli	Honda CBR600RR	10	+2.320	4	11
6	24	(Italy) Daniele Beretta	Suzuki GSX-R600	10	+3.059	6	10
7	89	(Italy) Domenico Colucci	Ducati 749R	10	+6.131	10	9
8	7	(Italy) Renato Costantini	Honda CBR600RR	10	+6.269	5	8
9	39	(Italy) Raffaele Filice	Yamaha YZF-R6	10	+12.084	8	7
10	41	(Switzerland) Gregory Junod	Suzuki GSX-R600	10	+16.978	9	6
11	69	(Czech Republic) Ondřej Ježek	Kawasaki ZX-6R	10	+17.154	11	5
12	77	(United Kingdom) Barry Burrell	Honda CBR600RR	10	+17.381	21	4
13	56	(Switzerland) Daniel Sutter	Honda CBR600RR	10	+17.695	17	3
14	44	(Italy) Christian Erbacci	Yamaha YZF-R6	10	+22.329	15	2
15	37	(Poland) Andrzej Chmielewski	Yamaha YZF-R6	10	+22.551	27	1
16	21	(France) Franck Millet	Yamaha YZF-R6	10	+22.962	12	
17	84	(Slovenia) Boštjan Pintar	Yamaha YZF-R6	10	+23.513	18	
18	30	(Switzerland) Michaël Savary	Yamaha YZF-R6	10	+23.626	23	
19	26	(United States) Will Gruy	Yamaha YZF-R6	10	+26.661	20	
20	34	(Sweden) Alexander Lundh	Honda CBR600RR	10	+27.125	28	
21	38	(Italy) Marco Bussolotti	Suzuki GSX-R600	10	+29.603	19	
22	99	(Italy) Roy Ten Napel	Yamaha YZF-R6	10	+29.734	13	
23	79	(Brazil) Luiz Carlos	Yamaha YZF-R6	10	+30.702	26	
24	88	(Norway) Mads Odin Hodt	Yamaha YZF-R6	10	+32.596	32	
25	199	(United Kingdom) Gregg Black	Honda CBR600RR	10	+35.393	25	
26	31	(Netherlands) Lennart Van Houwelingen	Suzuki GSX-R600	10	+35.584	30	
27	32	(Italy) Robert Gianfardoni	Suzuki GSX-R600	10	+36.179	31	
28	16	(United Kingdom) Christopher Northover	Suzuki GSX-R600	10	+44.147	35	
29	12	(Italy) Davide Caldart	Kawasaki ZX-6R	10	+44.446	24	
30	20	(Czech Republic) Jan Prudik	Honda CBR600RR	10	+44.693	29	
31	55	(Belgium) Vincent Lonbois	Suzuki GSX-R600	10	+44.804	36	
32	28	(Spain) Yannick Guerra	Yamaha YZF-R6	10	+45.722	34	
33	18	(United Kingdom) Matt Bond	Suzuki GSX-R600	10	+56.449	33	
Ret	11	(Italy) Leonardo Pedoni	Yamaha YZF-R6	7	Retirement	22	
Ret	33	(Italy) Alessandro Colatosti	Kawasaki ZX-6R	4	Retirement	16	
Ret	58	(Switzerland) Gabriel Berclaz	Yamaha YZF-R6	0	Retirement	14	
WD	96	(Netherlands) Marcel Van Nieuwenhuizen	Suzuki GSX-R600		Withdrew		
