= 2006 Monza Superbike World Championship round =

(Italy) 2006 Monza Superbike World Championship round
Round details
- Round 4 of 12 rounds in the 2006 Superbike World Championship. and Round 4 of 12 rounds in the 2006 Supersport World Championship.
- Date: May 7, 2006
- Location: Monza
- Course: Permanent racing facility 5.793 km (3.600 mi)

Superbike World Championship
Pole position
(Australia) Troy Corser
1:46.058
Fastest lap race 1	Fastest lap race 2
(Brazil) Alex Barros	(Australia) Troy Bayliss
1:47.027	1:46.815

Supersport World Championship
Pole position
(France) Sébastien Charpentier
1:50.580
Fastest lap
(France) Sébastien Charpentier
1:51.403

The 2006 Monza Superbike World Championship round was the fourth round of the 2006 Superbike World Championship. It took place on the weekend of May 5–7, 2006 at Monza.

== Results ==
=== Superbike race 1 classification ===
Pos	No	Rider	Bike	Laps	Time	Grid	Points
1	21	(Australia) Troy Bayliss	Ducati 999 F06	18	32:23.100	2	25
2	4	(Brazil) Alex Barros	Honda CBR1000RR	18	+3.982	3	20
3	1	(Australia) Troy Corser	Suzuki GSX-R1000 K6	18	+4.216	1	16
4	41	(Japan) Noriyuki Haga	Yamaha YZF R1	18	+4.395	10	13
5	88	(Australia) Andrew Pitt	Yamaha YZF R1	18	+13.605	6	11
6	31	(Australia) Karl Muggeridge	Honda CBR1000RR	18	+13.665	7	10
7	55	(France) Régis Laconi	Kawasaki ZX 10R	18	+14.066	4	9
8	44	(Italy) Roberto Rolfo	Ducati 999 F05	18	+19.170	11	8
9	57	(Italy) Lorenzo Lanzi	Ducati 999 F06	18	+25.729	13	7
10	38	(Japan) Shinichi Nakatomi	Yamaha YZF R1	18	+28.350	20	6
11	9	(United Kingdom) Chris Walker	Kawasaki ZX 10R	18	+29.639	5	5
12	16	(France) Sébastien Gimbert	Yamaha YZF R1	18	+30.354	18	4
13	15	(France) Fabien Foret	Suzuki GSX-R1000 K6	18	+43.838	12	3
14	105	(Italy) Lorenzo Alfonsi	Ducati 999 RS	18	+44.312	25	2
15	8	(Italy) Ivan Clementi	Ducati 999 RS	18	+44.530	21	1
16	66	(Italy) Norino Brignola	Ducati 999 RS	18	+1:05.782	26	
17	28	(Italy) Lorenzo Mauri	Ducati 999 RS	18	+1:06.502	28	
18	116	(Italy) Franco Battaini	Kawasaki ZX 10R	18	+1:29.793	29	
Ret	52	(United Kingdom) James Toseland	Honda CBR1000RR	16	Retirement	8	
Ret	99	(Australia) Steve Martin	Petronas FP1	6	Retirement	23	
Ret	18	(United Kingdom) Craig Jones	Petronas FP1	4	Retirement	30	
Ret	71	(Japan) Yukio Kagayama	Suzuki GSX-R1000 K6	3	Retirement	9	
Ret	20	(Italy) Marco Borciani	Ducati 999 F05	2	Retirement	17	
Ret	3	(Japan) Norifumi Abe	Yamaha YZF R1	0	Retirement	27	
Ret	13	(Italy) Vittorio Iannuzzo	Suzuki GSX-R1000 K6	0	Retirement	24	
Ret	69	(Italy) Gianluca Nannelli	Honda CBR1000RR	0	Retirement	22	
Ret	76	(Germany) Max Neukirchner	Ducati 999 RS	0	Retirement	19	
Ret	11	(Spain) Rubén Xaus	Ducati 999 F05	0	Retirement	16	
Ret	84	(Italy) Michel Fabrizio	Honda CBR1000RR	0	Retirement	15	
Ret	10	(Spain) Fonsi Nieto	Kawasaki ZX 10R	0	Retirement	14	

=== Superbike race 2 classification ===
Pos	No	Rider	Bike	Laps	Time	Grid	Points
1	21	(Australia) Troy Bayliss	Ducati 999 F06	18	32:17.705	2	25
2	1	(Australia) Troy Corser	Suzuki GSX-R1000 K6	18	+1.916	1	20
3	41	(Japan) Noriyuki Haga	Yamaha YZF R1	18	+6.479	10	16
4	4	(Brazil) Alex Barros	Honda CBR1000RR	18	+10.227	3	13
5	52	(United Kingdom) James Toseland	Honda CBR1000RR	18	+11.910	8	11
6	88	(Australia) Andrew Pitt	Yamaha YZF R1	18	+17.551	6	10
7	31	(Australia) Karl Muggeridge	Honda CBR1000RR	18	+17.720	7	9
8	10	(Spain) Fonsi Nieto	Kawasaki ZX 10R	18	+17.825	14	8
9	9	(United Kingdom) Chris Walker	Kawasaki ZX 10R	18	+22.873	5	7
10	44	(Italy) Roberto Rolfo	Ducati 999 F05	18	+31.603	11	6
11	57	(Italy) Lorenzo Lanzi	Ducati 999 F06	18	+31.610	13	5
12	38	(Japan) Shinichi Nakatomi	Yamaha YZF R1	18	+34.282	20	4
13	15	(France) Fabien Foret	Suzuki GSX-R1000 K6	18	+35.273	12	3
14	84	(Italy) Michel Fabrizio	Honda CBR1000RR	18	+35.306	15	2
15	11	(Spain) Rubén Xaus	Ducati 999 F05	18	+40.522	16	1
16	3	(Japan) Norifumi Abe	Yamaha YZF R1	18	+51.516	27	
17	13	(Italy) Vittorio Iannuzzo	Suzuki GSX-R1000 K6	18	+56.396	24	
18	69	(Italy) Gianluca Nannelli	Honda CBR1000RR	18	+58.679	22	
19	105	(Italy) Lorenzo Alfonsi	Ducati 999 RS	18	+59.135	25	
20	66	(Italy) Norino Brignola	Ducati 999 RS	18	+1:00.991	26	
21	20	(Italy) Marco Borciani	Ducati 999 F05	18	+1:12.581	17	
22	28	(Italy) Lorenzo Mauri	Ducati 999 RS	18	+1:26.383	28	
23	116	(Italy) Franco Battaini	Kawasaki ZX 10R	18	+1:26.954	29	
Ret	8	(Italy) Ivan Clementi	Ducati 999 RS	5	Retirement	21	
Ret	16	(France) Sébastien Gimbert	Yamaha YZF R1	3	Retirement	18	
Ret	55	(France) Régis Laconi	Kawasaki ZX 10R	2	Retirement	4	
Ret	99	(Australia) Steve Martin	Petronas FP1	2	Retirement	23	
Ret	71	(Japan) Yukio Kagayama	Suzuki GSX-R1000 K6	2	Retirement	9	
Ret	76	(Germany) Max Neukirchner	Ducati 999 RS	1	Retirement	19	
Ret	18	(United Kingdom) Craig Jones	Petronas FP1	0	Retirement	30	

=== Supersport race classification ===
Pos	No	Rider	Bike	Laps	Time	Grid	Points
1	32	(France) Yoann Tiberio	Honda CBR600RR	16		8	25
2	127	(Denmark) Robbin Harms	Honda CBR600RR	16	+1.924	6	20
3	16	(France) Sébastien Charpentier	Honda CBR600RR	16	+4.255	1	16
4	55	(Italy) Massimo Roccoli	Yamaha YZF-R6	16	+7.224	5	13
5	54	(Turkey) Kenan Sofuoğlu	Honda CBR600RR	16	+7.499	7	11
6	72	(United Kingdom) Stuart Easton	Ducati 749R	16	+9.015	19	10
7	23	(Australia) Broc Parkes	Yamaha YZF-R6	16	+9.117	11	9
8	116	(Sweden) Johan Stigefelt	Honda CBR600RR	16	+10.866	10	8
9	12	(Spain) Javier Forés	Yamaha YZF-R6	16	+10.997	18	7
10	7	(France) Stéphane Chambon	Kawasaki ZX-6R	16	+21.842	13	6
11	25	(Finland) Tatu Lausletho	Honda CBR600RR	16	+25.332	17	5
12	24	(Italy) Stefano Cruciani	Honda CBR600RR	16	+25.478	15	4
13	94	(Spain) David Checa	Yamaha YZF-R6	16	+26.654	21	3
14	31	(Finland) Vesa Kallio	Yamaha YZF-R6	16	+34.012	20	2
15	22	(Norway) Kai Børre Andersen	Suzuki GSX-R600	16	+38.406	16	1
16	8	(France) Maxime Berger	Kawasaki ZX-6R	16	+39.084	22	
17	6	(Italy) Mauro Sanchini	Yamaha YZF-R6	16	+45.191	30	
18	58	(Czech Republic) Tomáš Mikšovský	Honda CBR600RR	16	+49.322	31	
19	17	(Portugal) Miguel Praia	Honda CBR600RR	16	+49.345	25	
20	21	(Canada) Chris Peris	Yamaha YZF-R6	16	+51.732	26	
21	15	(Italy) Andrea Berta	Yamaha YZF-R6	16	+53.567	33	
22	60	(Russia) Vladimir Ivanov	Yamaha YZF-R6	16	+56.480	34	
23	38	(France) Grégory Leblanc	Honda CBR600RR	16	+1:31.254	28	
Ret	11	(Australia) Kevin Curtain	Yamaha YZF-R6	12	Retirement	4	
Ret	145	(Belgium) Sébastien Le Grelle	Honda CBR600RR	12	Retirement	9	
Ret	27	(United Kingdom) Tom Tunstall	Honda CBR600RR	11	Retirement	32	
Ret	57	(Slovenia) Luka Nedog	Ducati 749R	8	Retirement	29	
Ret	3	(Japan) Katsuaki Fujiwara	Honda CBR600RR	2	Retirement	3	
Ret	45	(Italy) Gianluca Vizziello	Yamaha YZF-R6	2	Retirement	2	
Ret	68	(Spain) David Forner García	Yamaha YZF-R6	0	Retirement	27	
Ret	77	(Netherlands) Barry Veneman	Suzuki GSX-R600	0	Retirement	14	
Ret	73	(Austria) Christian Zaiser	Ducati 749R	0	Retirement	12	

== Superstock 1000 race classification ==
Pos.	No.	Rider	Bike	Laps	Time/Retired	Grid	Points
1	53	(Italy) Alessandro Polita	Suzuki GSX-R1000 K6	11	20:31.118	1	25
2	5	(Italy) Riccardo Chiarello	Kawasaki ZX-10R	11	+0.357	6	20
3	86	(Italy) Ayrton Badovini	MV Agusta F4 1000 R	11	+9.079	4	16
4	42	(Spain) Alex Martinez	Kawasaki ZX-10R	11	+9.448	2	13
5	9	(Italy) Luca Scassa	MV Agusta F4 1000 R	11	+9.531	3	11
6	99	(Italy) Danilo Dell'Omo	Suzuki GSX-R1000 K6	11	+10.066	5	10
7	11	(Italy) Denis Sacchetti	Yamaha YZF-R1	11	+15.548	12	9
8	57	(Italy) Ilario Dionisi	Yamaha YZF-R1	11	+16.711	9	8
9	15	(Italy) Matteo Baiocco	Yamaha YZF-R1	11	+16.714	11	7
10	71	(Italy) Claudio Corti	Yamaha YZF-R1	11	+16.725	10	6
11	16	(Italy) Enrique Rocamora	Yamaha YZF-R1	11	+16.979	14	5
12	8	(France) Loïc Napoleone	Suzuki GSX-R1000 K6	11	+19.278	7	4
13	73	(Italy) Simone Saltarelli	Kawasaki ZX-10R	11	+25.388	16	3
14	24	(Slovenia) Marko Jerman	Suzuki GSX-R1000 K6	11	+26.751	18	2
15	71	(Norway) Peter Solli	Yamaha YZF-R1	11	+30.366	23	1
16	47	(United Kingdom) Richard Cooper	Honda CBR1000RR	11	+30.913	19	
17	96	(Czech Republic) Matěj Smrž	Honda CBR1000RR	11	+37.439	15	
18	12	(Germany) Leonardo Biliotti	MV Agusta F4 1000 R	11	+38.504	25	
19	13	(Italy) Andrea Paoloni	Suzuki GSX-R1000 K6	11	+38.685	24	
20	17	(France) Cédric Tangre	Suzuki GSX-R1000 K6	11	+38.938	22	
21	40	(Switzerland) Hervé Gantner	Yamaha YZF-R1	11	+39.005	20	
22	35	(Netherlands) Allard Kerkhoven	Suzuki GSX-R1000 K6	11	+42.701	27	
23	41	(Australia) Nick Henderson	Suzuki GSX-R1000 K6	11	+51.964	21	
24	14	(Italy) Mauro Belliero	Honda CBR1000RR	11	+1:00.521	31	
25	21	(Netherlands) Leon Bovee	Suzuki GSX-R1000 K6	11	+1:00.794	32	
26	55	(Belgium) Olivier Depoorter	Yamaha YZF-R1	11	+1:00.835	35	
27	19	(Italy) Gabriele Perri	Suzuki GSX-R1000 K6	11	+1:17.338	33	
28	82	(Italy) Giuseppe Cedroni	Honda CBR1000RR	11	+1:34.853	36	
Ret	10	(Italy) Giuseppe Natalini	Yamaha YZF-R1	9	Retirement	28	
Ret	44	(Italy) Roberto Lunadei	Yamaha YZF-R1	8	Accident	8	
Ret	69	(France) David Fouloy	Suzuki GSX-R1000 K6	7	Accident	26	
Ret	28	(Belgium) Sepp Vermonden	Suzuki GSX-R1000 K6	6	Retirement	17	
Ret	32	(South Africa) Sheridan Morais	Suzuki GSX-R1000 K6	3	Accident	13	
Ret	31	(Italy) Giuseppe Barone	MV Agusta F4 1000 R	1	Accident	29	
Ret	34	(Republic of Ireland) Mark Pollock	Suzuki GSX-R1000 K6	0	Retirement	30	
Ret	18	(Belgium) Eric Van Bael	Suzuki GSX-R1000 K6	0	Accident	34	
DNS	45	(Italy) Gianluca Rapicavoli	MV Agusta F4 1000 R		Did not start		

== Superstock 600 race classification ==
Pos.	No.	Rider	Bike	Laps	Time/Retired	Grid	Points
1	19	(Belgium) Xavier Simeon	Suzuki GSX-R600	9	17:47.336	2	25
2	10	(Italy) Davide Giugliano	Kawasaki ZX-6R	9	+11.350	3	20
3	33	(Italy) Alessandro Colatosti	Kawasaki ZX-6R	9	+11.441	11	16
4	47	(Italy) Eddi La Marra	Yamaha YZF-R6	9	+11.466	10	13
5	7	(Italy) Renato Costantini	Honda CBR600RR	9	+12.317	18	11
6	89	(Italy) Domenico Colucci	Ducati 749R	9	+12.918	9	10
7	30	(Switzerland) Michaël Savary	Yamaha YZF-R6	9	+12.941	17	9
8	21	(France) Franck Millet	Yamaha YZF-R6	9	+13.675	13	8
9	41	(Switzerland) Gregory Junod	Suzuki GSX-R600	9	+23.360	20	7
10	69	(Czech Republic) Ondřej Ježek	Kawasaki ZX-6R	9	+23.610	15	6
11	24	(Italy) Daniele Beretta	Suzuki GSX-R600	9	+24.411	16	5
12	99	(Netherlands) Roy Ten Napel	Yamaha YZF-R6	9	+24.600	7	4
13	31	(Netherlands) Lennart Van Houwelingen	Suzuki GSX-R600	9	+24.927	23	3
14	37	(Poland) Andrzej Chmielewski	Yamaha YZF-R6	9	+29.983	19	2
15	36	(Italy) Jarno Colosio	Suzuki GSX-R600	9	+31.372	14	1
16	77	(United Kingdom) Barry Burrell	Honda CBR600RR	9	+31.376	28	
17	18	(United Kingdom) Matt Bond	Suzuki GSX-R600	9	+31.673	29	
18	96	(Netherlands) Marcel Van Nieuwenhuizen	Suzuki GSX-R600	9	+42.794	30	
19	26	(United States) Will Gruy	Yamaha YZF-R6	9	+42.837	22	
20	12	(Italy) Davide Caldart	Kawasaki ZX-6R	9	+48.718	25	
21	32	(Italy) Robert Gianfardoni	Yamaha YZF-R6	9	+51.283	32	
22	16	(United Kingdom) Christopher Northover	Suzuki GSX-R600	9	+53.490	13	
23	20	(Czech Republic) Jan Prudik	Honda CBR600RR	9	+59.731	24	
24	55	(Belgium) Vincent Lonbois	Suzuki GSX-R600	9	+1:42.147	33	
Ret	59	(Italy) Niccolò Canepa	Ducati 749R	8	Accident	1	
Ret	8	(Italy) Andrea Antonelli	Honda CBR600RR	8	Accident	5	
Ret	199	(United Kingdom) Gregg Black	Yamaha YZF-R6	8	Accident	21	
Ret	84	(Slovenia) Boštjan Pintar	Yamaha YZF-R6	4	Accident	12	
Ret	88	(Norway) Mads Odin Hodt	Yamaha YZF-R6	3	Accident	8	
Ret	34	(Sweden) Alexander Lundh	Honda CBR600RR	2	Accident	27	
Ret	28	(Spain) Yannick Guerra	Yamaha YZF-R6	2	Accident	26	
Ret	56	(Switzerland) Daniel Sutter	Honda CBR600RR	0	Retirement	6	
DNS	14	(France) Mathieu Gines	Yamaha YZF-R6	0	Did not start	4	
DNS	58	(Switzerland) Gabriel Berclaz	Yamaha YZF-R6		Did not start		
WD	79	(Brazil) Luiz Carlos	Yamaha YZF-R6		Withdrew		
