= 2006 Silverstone Superbike World Championship round =

(United Kingdom) 2006 Silverstone Superbike World Championship round
Round details
- Round 5 of 12 rounds in the 2006 Superbike World Championship. and Round 5 of 12 rounds in the 2006 Supersport World Championship.
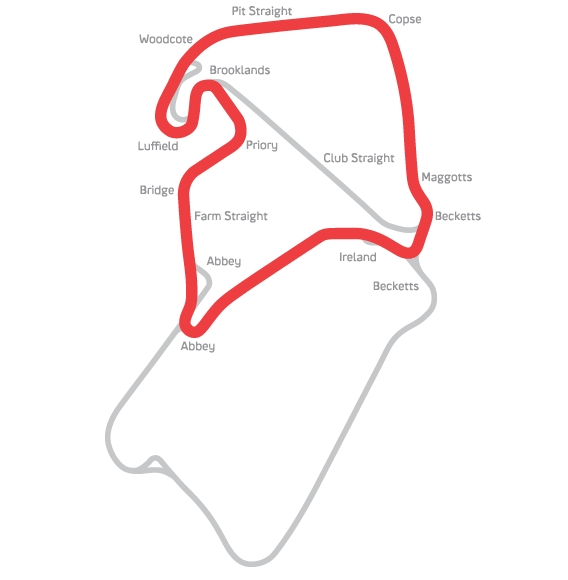
- Date: 28 May, 2006
- Location: Silverstone
- Course: Permanent racing facility 3.619 km (2.249 mi)

Superbike World Championship
Pole position
(United Kingdom) Tommy Hill
1:38.001
Fastest lap race 1	Fastest lap race 2
(Spain) Rubén Xaus	(Australia) Troy Bayliss
1:26.785	1:26.299

Supersport World Championship
Pole position
(France) Sébastien Charpentier
1:30.516
Fastest lap
(Australia) Broc Parkes
1:29.124

The 2006 Silverstone Superbike World Championship round was the fifth round of the 2006 Superbike World Championship. It took place on the weekend of 26–28 May 2006 at Silverstone.

== Results ==
=== Superbike race 1 classification ===
Pos	No	Rider	Bike	Laps	Time	Grid	Points
1	21	(Australia) Troy Bayliss	Ducati 999 F06	28	40:49.894	2	25
2	41	(Japan) Noriyuki Haga	Yamaha YZF R1	28	+0.890	4	20
3	52	(United Kingdom) James Toseland	Honda CBR1000RR	28	+1.705	14	16
4	11	(Spain) Rubén Xaus	Ducati 999 F05	28	+8.285	7	13
5	88	(Australia) Andrew Pitt	Yamaha YZF R1	28	+12.303	11	11
6	9	(United Kingdom) Chris Walker	Kawasaki ZX 10R	28	+23.716	3	10
7	55	(France) Régis Laconi	Kawasaki ZX 10R	28	+25.483	9	9
8	31	(Australia) Karl Muggeridge	Honda CBR1000RR	28	+26.049	8	8
9	4	(Brazil) Alex Barros	Honda CBR1000RR	28	+29.650	6	7
10	3	(Japan) Norifumi Abe	Yamaha YZF R1	28	+32.208	15	6
11	10	(Spain) Fonsi Nieto	Kawasaki ZX 10R	28	+39.607	13	5
12	81	(United Kingdom) Tommy Hill	Yamaha YZF R1	28	+41.550	1	4
13	57	(Italy) Lorenzo Lanzi	Ducati 999 F06	28	+41.935	17	3
14	71	(Japan) Yukio Kagayama	Suzuki GSX-R1000 K6	28	+50.385	16	2
15	69	(Italy) Gianluca Nannelli	Honda CBR1000RR	28	+52.726	22	1
16	76	(Germany) Max Neukirchner	Ducati 999 RS	28	+52.760	19	
17	44	(Italy) Roberto Rolfo	Ducati 999 F05	28	+53.214	23	
18	13	(Italy) Vittorio Iannuzzo	Suzuki GSX-R1000 K6	28	+54.137	26	
Ret	8	(Italy) Ivan Clementi	Ducati 999 RS	20	Retirement	18	
Ret	16	(France) Sébastien Gimbert	Yamaha YZF R1	19	Retirement	12	
Ret	99	(Australia) Steve Martin	Petronas FP1	19	Retirement	27	
Ret	25	(Australia) Josh Brookes	Kawasaki ZX 10R	19	Retirement	21	
Ret	84	(Italy) Michel Fabrizio	Honda CBR1000RR	16	Retirement	5	
Ret	15	(France) Fabien Foret	Suzuki GSX-R1000 K6	9	Retirement	25	
Ret	1	(Australia) Troy Corser	Suzuki GSX-R1000 K6	6	Retirement	10	
Ret	18	(United Kingdom) Craig Jones	Petronas FP1	0	Retirement	24	
DNS	38	(Japan) Shinichi Nakatomi	Yamaha YZF R1		Not started	20	
DNS	20	(Italy) Marco Borciani	Ducati 999 F05		Not started	28	

=== Superbike race 2 classification ===
Pos	No	Rider	Bike	Laps	Time	Grid	Points
1	21	(Australia) Troy Bayliss	Ducati 999 F06	28	40:42.003	2	25
2	41	(Japan) Noriyuki Haga	Yamaha YZF R1	28	+1.585	4	20
3	52	(United Kingdom) James Toseland	Honda CBR1000RR	28	+12.058	14	16
4	88	(Australia) Andrew Pitt	Yamaha YZF R1	28	+14.561	11	13
5	4	(Brazil) Alex Barros	Honda CBR1000RR	28	+16.826	6	11
6	1	(Australia) Troy Corser	Suzuki GSX-R1000 K6	28	+21.230	10	10
7	11	(Spain) Rubén Xaus	Ducati 999 F05	28	+22.056	7	9
8	9	(United Kingdom) Chris Walker	Kawasaki ZX 10R	28	+22.549	3	8
9	31	(Australia) Karl Muggeridge	Honda CBR1000RR	28	+22.708	8	7
10	10	(Spain) Fonsi Nieto	Kawasaki ZX 10R	28	+34.025	13	6
11	3	(Japan) Norifumi Abe	Yamaha YZF R1	28	+34.739	15	5
12	81	(United Kingdom) Tommy Hill	Yamaha YZF R1	28	+35.112	1	4
13	71	(Japan) Yukio Kagayama	Suzuki GSX-R1000 K6	28	+35.518	16	3
14	55	(France) Régis Laconi	Kawasaki ZX 10R	28	+36.322	9	2
15	84	(Italy) Michel Fabrizio	Honda CBR1000RR	28	+47.850	5	1
16	57	(Italy) Lorenzo Lanzi	Ducati 999 F06	28	+50.101	17	
17	69	(Italy) Gianluca Nannelli	Honda CBR1000RR	28	+51.089	22	
18	25	(Australia) Josh Brookes	Kawasaki ZX 10R	28	+52.191	21	
19	44	(Italy) Roberto Rolfo	Ducati 999 F05	28	+52.255	23	
Ret	8	(Italy) Ivan Clementi	Ducati 999 RS	26	Retirement	18	
Ret	16	(France) Sébastien Gimbert	Yamaha YZF R1	17	Retirement	12	
Ret	15	(France) Fabien Foret	Suzuki GSX-R1000 K6	15	Retirement	25	
Ret	76	(Germany) Max Neukirchner	Ducati 999 RS	14	Retirement	19	
Ret	99	(Australia) Steve Martin	Petronas FP1	10	Retirement	27	
Ret	13	(Italy) Vittorio Iannuzzo	Suzuki GSX-R1000 K6	6	Retirement	26	
DNS	18	(United Kingdom) Craig Jones	Petronas FP1		Not started	24	
DNS	38	(Japan) Shinichi Nakatomi	Yamaha YZF R1		Not started	20	
DNS	20	(Italy) Marco Borciani	Ducati 999 F05		Not started	28	

=== Supersport race classification ===
Pos	No	Rider	Bike	Laps	Time	Grid	Points
1	16	(France) Sébastien Charpentier	Honda CBR600RR	28	41:54.640	1	25
2	23	(Australia) Broc Parkes	Yamaha YZF-R6	28	+2.802	3	20
3	11	(Australia) Kevin Curtain	Yamaha YZF-R6	28	+6.767	2	16
4	51	(Spain) Pere Riba	Kawasaki ZX-6R	28	+17.116	4	13
5	127	(Denmark) Robin Harms	Honda CBR600RR	28	+26.102	24	11
6	55	(Italy) Massimo Roccoli	Yamaha YZF-R6	28	+26.373	5	10
7	12	(Spain) Javier Forés	Yamaha YZF-R6	28	+27.097	7	9
8	18	(France) Mathieu Lagrive	Honda CBR600RR	28	+27.492	6	8
9	116	(Sweden) Johan Stigefelt	Honda CBR600RR	28	+29.073	8	7
10	3	(Japan) Katsuaki Fujiwara	Honda CBR600RR	28	+41.265	9	6
11	94	(Spain) David Checa	Yamaha YZF-R6	28	+41.615	13	5
12	8	(France) Maxime Berger	Kawasaki ZX-6R	28	+43.602	16	4
13	22	(Norway) Kai Børre Andersen	Suzuki GSX-R600	28	+44.079	12	3
14	32	(France) Yoann Tiberio	Honda CBR600RR	28	+47.538	10	2
15	72	(United Kingdom) Stuart Easton	Ducati 749R	28	+49.619	25	1
16	25	(Finland) Tatu Lauslehto	Honda CBR600RR	28	+51.383	28	
17	7	(France) Stéphane Chambon	Kawasaki ZX-6R	28	+52.544	26	
18	77	(Netherlands) Barry Veneman	Suzuki GSX-R600	28	+52.719	14	
19	5	(Italy) Mauro Sanchini	Yamaha YZF-R6	28	+1:02.972	11	
20	54	(Turkey) Kenan Sofuoğlu	Honda CBR600RR	28	+1:05.725	18	
21	76	(Spain) Bernat Martinez	Yamaha YZF-R6	28	+1:16.412	30	
22	27	(United Kingdom) Tom Tunstall	Honda CBR600RR	28	+1:17.059	35	
23	17	(Portugal) Miguel Praia	Honda CBR600RR	28	+1:18.457	23	
24	71	(United Kingdom) Sam Owens	Yamaha YZF-R6	28	+1:22.319	31	
25	60	(Russia) Vladimir Ivanov	Yamaha YZF-R6	27	+1 lap	29	
26	38	(France) Grégory Leblanc	Honda CBR600RR	27	+1 lap	19	
Ret	45	(Italy) Gianluca Vizziello	Yamaha YZF-R6	18	Retirement	15	
Ret	121	(Italy) Alessio Aldrovandi	Honda CBR600RR	17	Retirement	32	
Ret	88	(France) Julien Enjolras	Yamaha YZF-R6	14	Retirement	17	
Ret	73	(Austria) Christian Zaiser	Ducati 749R	14	Retirement	22	
Ret	5	(Italy) Alessio Velini	Yamaha YZF-R6	8	Retirement	33	
Ret	9	(Italy) Alessio Corradi	Yamaha YZF-R6	7	Retirement	27	
Ret	52	(United Kingdom) Steven Neate	Honda CBR600RR	5	Accident	21	
Ret	145	(Belgium) Sebastien Le Grelle	Honda CBR600RR	2	Accident	20	
DNS	15	(Italy) Andrea Berta	Yamaha YZF-R6	0	Did not start	34	
DNS	37	(San Marino) William De Angelis	Honda CBR600RR		Did not start		
DNQ	57	(Slovenia) Luka Nedog	Ducati 749R		Did not qualify		
WD	21	(Canada) Chris Peris	Yamaha YZF-R6		Withdrew		

== Superstock 1000 race classification ==
Pos.	No.	Rider	Bike	Laps	Time/Retired	Grid	Points
1	77	(Italy) Claudio Corti	Yamaha YZF-R1	15	22:38.681	1	25
2	53	(Italy) Alessandro Polita	Suzuki GSX-R1000 K6	15	+1.251	2	20
3	86	(Italy) Ayrton Badovini	MV Agusta F4 1000 R	15	+2.118	5	16
4	9	(Italy) Luca Scassa	MV Agusta F4 1000 R	15	+2.266	3	13
5	16	(Spain) Enrique Rocamora	Yamaha YZF-R1	15	+11.713	10	11
6	57	(Italy) Ilario Dionisi	Yamaha YZF-R1	15	+12.548	6	10
7	32	(South Africa) Sheridan Morais	Suzuki GSX-R1000 K6	15	+12.682	14	9
8	11	(Italy) Denis Sacchetti	Kawasaki ZX-10R	15	+15.355	15	8
9	15	(Italy) Matteo Baiocco	Yamaha YZF-R1	15	+17.405	8	7
10	8	(France) Loïc Napoleone	Suzuki GSX-R1000 K6	15	+18.546	7	6
11	5	(Italy) Riccardo Chiarello	Kawasaki ZX-10R	15	+20.824	4	5
12	42	(Spain) Alex Martinez	Kawasaki ZX-10R	15	+21.952	11	4
13	47	(United Kingdom) Richard Cooper	Honda CBR1000RR	15	+23.090	18	3
14	96	(Czech Republic) Matěj Smrž	Honda CBR1000RR	15	+24.975	17	2
15	17	(France) Cédric Tangre	Suzuki GSX-R1000 K6	15	+26.119	19	1
16	73	(Italy) Simone Saltarelli	Kawasaki ZX-10R	15	+26.868	23	
17	44	(Italy) Roberto Lunadei	Yamaha YZF-R1	15	+26.904	24	
18	22	(United Kingdom) Guy Sanders	Kawasaki ZX-10R	15	+30.633	9	
19	28	(Belgium) Sepp Vermonden	Suzuki GSX-R1000 K6	15	+30.929	13	
20	23	(United Kingdom) Howie Mainwaring	Yamaha YZF-R1	15	+35.156	22	
21	24	(Slovenia) Marko Jerman	Suzuki GSX-R1000 K6	15	+35.211	16	
22	34	(Republic of Ireland) Mark Pollock	Suzuki GSX-R1000 K6	15	+40.479	27	
23	41	(Australia) Nick Henderson	Suzuki GSX-R1000 K6	15	+40.762	25	
24	71	(Norway) Peter Solli	Yamaha YZF-R1	15	+43.090	28	
25	35	(Netherlands) Allard Kerkhoven	Suzuki GSX-R1000 K6	15	+43.837	31	
26	10	(Italy) Giuseppe Natalini	Suzuki GSX-R1000 K6	15	+54.346	32	
27	21	(Netherlands) Leon Bovee	Suzuki GSX-R1000 K6	15	+57.279	33	
28	14	(Italy) Mauro Belliero	Honda CBR1000RR	15	+57.757	34	
29	55	(Italy) Olivier Depoorter	Yamaha YZF-R1	15	+1:04.887	26	
30	18	(Belgium) Eric Van Bael	Suzuki GSX-R1000 K6	15	+1:06.770	30	
31	45	(Italy) Gianluca Rapicavoli	MV Agusta F4 1000 R	15	+1:07.857	29	
Ret	12	(Germany) Leonardo Biliotti	MV Agusta F4 1000 R	13	Accident	21	
Ret	99	(Italy) Danilo Dell'Omo	Suzuki GSX-R1000 K6	2	Accident	12	
Ret	69	(France) David Fouloy	Suzuki GSX-R1000 K6	0	Technical problem	20	
DNQ	82	(Italy) Giuseppe Cedroni	Honda CBR1000RR		Did not qualify		
DNQ	31	(Italy) Giuseppe Barone	Suzuki GSX-R1000 K6		Did not qualify		
WD	13	(Italy) Andrea Paoloni	Suzuki GSX-R1000 K6		Withdrew		

== Superstock 600 race classification ==
Pos.	No.	Rider	Bike	Laps	Time/Retired	Grid	Points
1	59	(Italy) Niccolò Canepa	Ducati 749R	12	18:52.949	1	25
2	19	(Belgium) Xavier Simeon	Suzuki GSX-R600	12	+0.048	3	20
3	10	(Italy) Davide Giugliano	Kawasaki ZX-6R	12	+2.353	2	16
4	89	(Italy) Domenico Colucci	Ducati 749R	12	+8.040	9	13
5	8	(Italy) Andrea Antonelli	Honda CBR600RR	12	+8.841	4	11
6	7	(Italy) Renato Costantini	Honda CBR600RR	12	+11.832	6	10
7	77	(United Kingdom) Barry Burrell	Honda CBR600RR	12	+20.023	7	9
8	21	(France) Franck Millet	Yamaha YZF-R6	12	+24.811	12	8
9	69	(Czech Republic) Ondřej Ježek	Kawasaki ZX-6R	12	+28.800	11	7
10	41	(Switzerland) Gregory Junod	Suzuki GSX-R600	12	+29.178	15	6
11	30	(Switzerland) Michaël Savary	Yamaha YZF-R6	12	+29.700	21	5
12	33	(Italy) Alessandro Colatosti	Kawasaki ZX-6R	12	+31.122	5	4
13	24	(Italy) Daniele Beretta	Suzuki GSX-R600	12	+33.636	13	3
14	18	(United Kingdom) Matt Bond	Suzuki GSX-R600	12	+36.785	23	2
15	16	(United Kingdom) Christopher Northover	Suzuki GSX-R600	12	+40.198	29	1
16	84	(Slovenia) Boštjan Pintar	Yamaha YZF-R6	12	+40.970	17	
17	47	(Italy) Eddi La Marra	Yamaha YZF-R6	12	+41.477	10	
18	199	(United Kingdom) Gregg Black	Honda CBR600RR	12	+44.882	22	
19	99	(Netherlands) Roy Ten Napel	Yamaha YZF-R6	12	+50.059	16	
20	37	(Poland) Andrzej Chmielewski	Yamaha YZF-R6	12	+50.985	27	
21	96	(Netherlands) Marcel Van Nieuwenhuizen	Suzuki GSX-R600	12	+54.731	24	
22	34	(Sweden) Alexander Lundh	Honda CBR600RR	12	+58.843	26	
23	88	(Norway) Mads Odin Hodt	Yamaha YZF-R6	12	+1:02.728	25	
24	31	(Netherlands) Lennart Van Houwelingen	Suzuki GSX-R600	12	+1:05.134	33	
25	20	(Czech Republic) Jan Prudik	Honda CBR600RR	12	+1:09.397	31	
26	79	(Brazil) Luiz Carlos	Yamaha YZF-R6	12	+1:11.830	28	
27	55	(Belgium) Vincent Lonbois	Suzuki GSX-R600	12	+1:19.140	32	
28	32	(Italy) Robert Gianfardoni	Yamaha YZF-R6	12	+1:26.316	34	
Ret	12	(Italy) Davide Caldart	Kawasaki ZX-6R	7	Retirement	20	
Ret	28	(Spain) Yannick Guerra	Yamaha YZF-R6	7	Retirement	30	
Ret	44	(Italy) Cristiano Erbacci	Yamaha YZF-R6	6	Retirement	19	
Ret	35	(Netherlands) Ronald Ter Braake	Kawasaki ZX-6R	5	Retirement	14	
Ret	56	(Switzerland) Daniel Sutter	Honda CBR600RR	3	Accident	8	
Ret	26	(United States) Will Gruy	Yamaha YZF-R6	0	Accident	18	
