= Andrea Berta =

Italian football executive (born 1972)

- Born: 1 January 1972 (age 54); Orzinuovi, Brescia, Italy
- Occupations: Football executive and businessman

Andrea Berta (born 1 January 1972) is an Italian football executive and businessman, currently serving as sporting director of Premier League club Arsenal. He rose to prominence during a 12-year spell at Atlético Madrid.

== Early life and education ==
Berta was born in Orzinuovi, in the province of Brescia, Italy. Before entering football, he worked in banking and finance, including a role as branch manager at BCC Pompiano. His interest in football management emerged from organizing local tournaments, which eventually led him into the professional football world.

== Career ==
=== Early career ===
Berta began his executive career in Italian football with Carpenedolo (2002–2007), where he served in a technical role. He later held positions at Parma (2007–2009) and Genoa (2009–2012), working in various scouting and sporting director capacities. His early work in Italy helped establish his reputation for spotting talent and managing club resources efficiently.

=== Atlético Madrid (2013–2025) ===
In 2013, Berta joined Atlético Madrid as Technical Director, and was promoted to Sporting Director in 2017. During his tenure, Atlético Madrid enjoyed one of the most successful periods in its modern history:

- La Liga: 2013–14, 2020–21
- UEFA Europa League: 2017–18
- UEFA Super Cup: 2018
- Copa del Rey: 2012–13
- Supercopa de España: 2014

Berta was instrumental in identifying and signing several key players, including Antoine Griezmann, Jan Oblak, Rodri and João Félix. His player recruitment model emphasized value, versatility and mental resilience.

In 2019, Berta was awarded Best Sporting Director of the Year at the Globe Soccer Awards, recognizing his influence on Atlético’s sustained competitiveness both in Spain and in Europe.

=== Arsenal (2025–present) ===
On 30 March 2025, Arsenal announced Berta as their new Sporting Director, succeeding Edu Gaspar. His appointment marked a shift in Arsenal’s football operations, with a focus on blending strategic recruitment, financial discipline and European-style football governance.

Charged with building on Arsenal's recent success and converting potential into trophies, Berta walked into the 25/26 summer transfer window with two main tasks, strengthen the key areas of the squad and enhance squad depth. Manager Mikel Arteta described him as “a big addition to a team” emphasising that Berta’s arrival was intended to enhance rather than overhaul the playing group. Early reports outlined several priorities like, securing a striker, a holding midfielder, a left-winger, a backup goalkeeper, reinforcements at full-back and midfield and renewing contracts for star players such as Bukayo Saka and William Saliba. During the 25/26 transfer window Berta signed Kepa Arrizabalaga from Chelsea F.C., Martín Zubimendi from Real Sociedad, Christian Nørgaard from Brentford F.C., Cristhian Mosquera from Valencia CF, Noni Madueke from Chelsea, Viktor Gyökeres from Sporting CP, Eberechi Eze from Crystal Palace F.C. and Piero Hincapié from Bayer Leverkusen on a loan deal.

In 2025/26, Arsenal F.C. would go on to win its 14th top-flight league title.

== Football philosophy and style ==
Berta is known for his data-informed scouting methods, long-term squad planning, and disciplined negotiation style. He combines traditional football scouting with advanced performance analytics, often seeking undervalued talent that fits a club’s tactical identity.

In transfer negotiations, Berta is described as discreet, strategic and firm, favoring structured deals with performance-based clauses to maintain financial sustainability.

== Personal life ==
Berta keeps a low public profile and rarely speaks in the media. He is fluent in Italian and Spanish, and is known within the football world for his professionalism and reserved demeanor. He avoids public controversies and maintains a strictly business-first approach in his role.

== Honors and awards ==
- Best Sporting Director of the Year – Globe Soccer Awards, 2019
- Miglior direttore sportivo dell'anno
- Premio Maestrelli 2022

== See also ==
- Atlético Madrid
- Arsenal
