= Fabien Foret =

French motorcycle racer

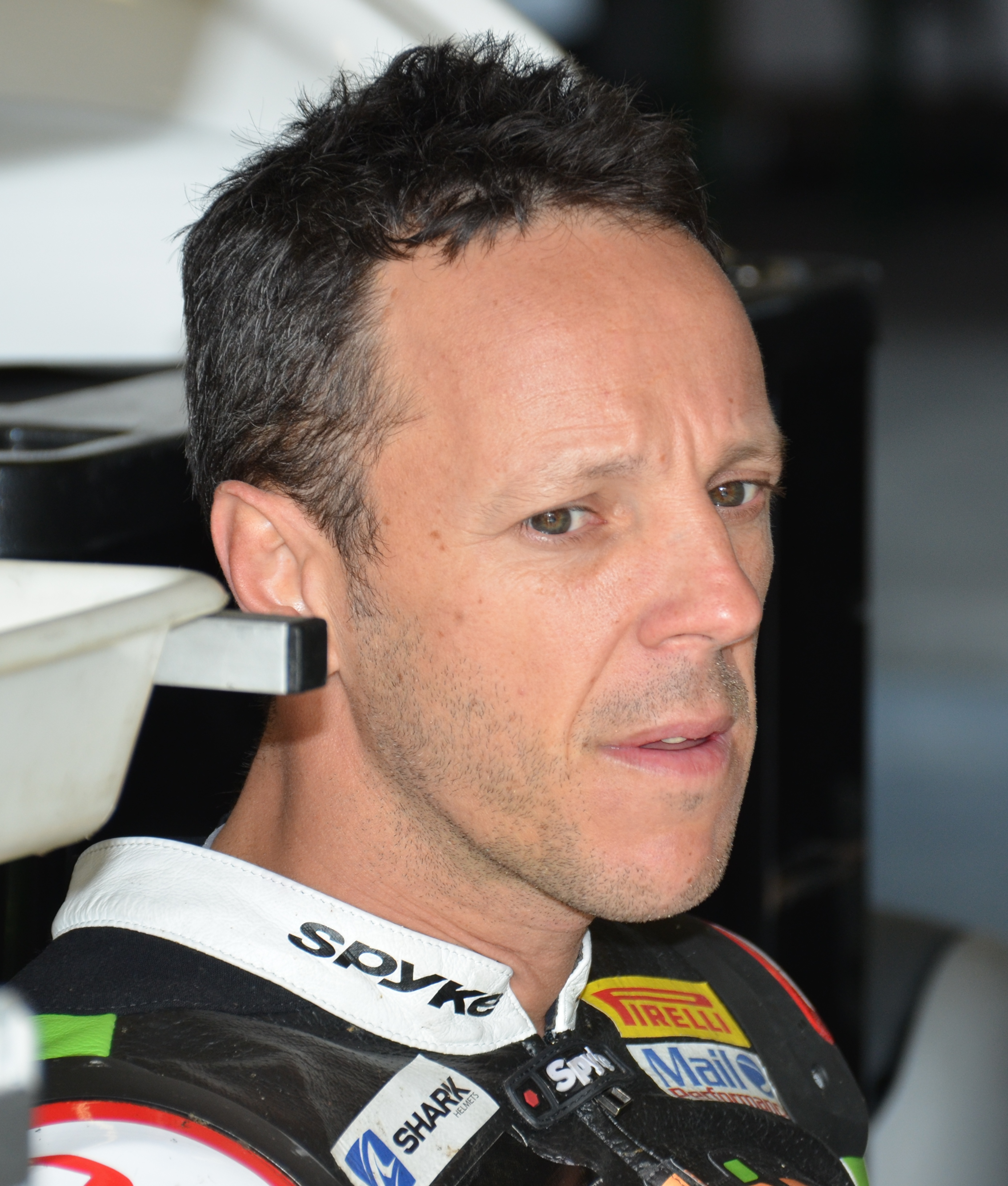
- Foret in Bol d'Or 2014
- Nationality: French
- Born: 29 January 1973 (age 53); Angoulême, France
- Current team: Team SRC Kawasaki
- Bike number: 11
Motorcycle racing career statistics
Superbike World Championship
Active years	2006, 2014
Manufacturers	Suzuki, Kawasaki
Championships	0
2014 championship position	20th (20 pts)
Starts / Wins / Podiums / Poles / F. laps / Points; 31 / 0 / 0 / 0 / 0 / 39
Supersport World Championship
Active years	2000–2013
Manufacturers	Yamaha, Ducati, Honda, Kawasaki
Championships	1 (2002)
2013 championship position	3rd (140 pts)
Starts / Wins / Podiums / Poles / F. laps / Points; 151 / 16 / 44 / 14 / 16 / 1475

Fabien Foret (born 29 January 1973 in Angoulême, France) is a professional motorcycle racer currently competing in the FIM Endurance World Championship aboard a Kawasaki ZX-10R. He has spent most of his career in the Supersport World Championship.

After taking part in the French national championships for a number of years, Foret moved to the Supersport World Championship in 2000. That same year, he won the 24 Hours of Spa-Francorchamps, and the Bol d'Or endurance races.

In 2001, Foret finished eighth in the Supersport World Championship with two race wins, and also finished second at the 24 Hours of Le Mans and the Bol d'Or endurance races.

Foret won the Supersport World Championship in 2002 for Ten Kate Honda, taking four race.

Foret continued racing in the Supersport World Championship from 2003 to 2005, finishing ninth in 2003, seventh in 2004 and fourth in 2005 with one race win each season.

Foret moved to the Superbike World Championship in 2006 riding for Alstare Engineering Corona Extra Suzuki. After a poor first half of the season, he was replaced by Max Neukirchner. He returned to the Supersport World Championship for the end of the season.

Foret joined Kawasaki Gil Motor Sport for 2007 and he finished the season third overall with a single win, at Philip Island. For 2008, he joined the official Yamaha o team managed by former Grand Prix racer Wilco Zeelenberg. He opened the year with pole position at Losail and took a win at Monza and finished fourth or better in each of the first six rounds, but a heavy crash at Brno caused him to miss several races he currently rides for Kawasaki Intermoto With Czech and Welsh technician's.

In 2015, Foret won the Bol d'Or with Team Kawasaki SRC.

In 2016, Foret won the 24 Hour Endurance Race in Le Mans with Team Kawasaki SRC.

== Career statistics ==
=== Supersport World Championship ===
==== Races by year ====
Year	Team	1	2	3	4	5	6	7	8	9	10	11	12	13	14	Pos.	Pts
1999	Yamaha	RSA	GBR	SPA	ITA	GER	SMR	USA	EUR; 18	AUT; Ret	NED; 18	GER				NC	0
2000	Ducati	AUS; DNS	JPN; DNS	GBR; Ret	ITA; 12	GER; Ret	SMR	SPA	EUR; Ret	NED; Ret	GER; 3	GBR; 13				19th	23
2001	Honda	SPA; 15	AUS; 19	JPN; 8	ITA; Ret	GBR; 11	GER; Ret	SMR; 4	EUR; 9	GER; 1	NED; 10	ITA; 1				8th	90
2002	Honda	SPA; 1	AUS; 9	RSA; 5	JPN; 3	ITA; 1	GBR; 7	GER; DSQ	SMR; 1	GBR; 2	GER; 6	NED; 1	ITA; 4			1st	186
2003	Kawasaki	SPA; 14	AUS; 11	JPN; Ret	ITA; 5	GER; Ret	GBR; Ret	SMR; 1	GBR; 5	NED; 6	ITA; Ret	FRA; Ret				9th	64
2004	Yamaha	SPA; 2	AUS; 6	SMR; Ret	ITA; DSQ	GER; Ret	GBR; 1	GBR; Ret	NED; Ret	ITA; 5	FRA; Ret					7th	66
2005	Honda	QAT; 5	AUS; 3	SPA; 5	ITA	EUR; 3	SMR; 2	CZE; Ret	GBR; 5	NED; 1	GER; 3	ITA; 11	FRA; 4			4th	144
2006	Yamaha	QAT	AUS	SPA	ITA	EUR	SMR	CZE	GBR	NED	GER; 3	ITA				25th	16
2006	Kawasaki												FRA; Ret			25th	16
2007	Kawasaki	QAT; 4	AUS; 1	EUR; Ret	SPA; 4	NED; 3	ITA; 2	GBR; 4	SMR; Ret	CZE; 3	GBR; 6	GER; Ret	ITA; 14	FRA; Ret		3rd	128
2008	Yamaha	QAT; Ret	AUS; 4	SPA; 2	NED; 4	ITA; 1	GER; 4	SMR; 4	CZE	GBR	EUR	ITA	FRA; 8	POR; 10		6th	111
2009	Yamaha	AUS; 7	QAT; Ret	SPA; 10	NED; 4	ITA; 3	RSA; Ret	USA; 5	SMR; 8	GBR; Ret	CZE; 1	GER; 5	ITA; 3	FRA; Ret	POR; 8	5th	123
2010	Kawasaki	AUS; 5	POR; 5	SPA; 10	NED; Ret	ITA; Ret	RSA; Ret	USA; 10	SMR; 8	CZE; 10	GBR; 12	GER; 4	ITA; Ret	FRA; Ret		13th	65
2011	Honda	AUS; Ret	EUR; DNS	NED; 2	ITA; 3	SMR; 2	SPA; 7	CZE; 2	GBR; 3	GER; 6	ITA; 1	FRA; 8	POR; 12			3rd	148
2012	Kawasaki	AUS; 2	ITA; 1	NED; Ret	ITA; 12	EUR; 10	SMR; 8	SPA; 2	CZE; 1	GBR; 6	RUS; 6	GER; 3	POR; 3	FRA; 5		4th	171
2013	Kawasaki	AUS; 4	SPA; 1	NED; 3	ITA; DNS	GBR; 9	POR; 2	ITA; 12	RUS; C	GBR; 3	GER; 2	TUR; Ret	FRA; 4	SPA; 10		3rd	140

=== Superbike World Championship ===
==== Races by year ====
Year	Make	1		2		3		4		5		6		7		8		9		10		11		12		Pos.	Pts
Year	Make	R1	R2	R1	R2	R1	R2	R1	R2	R1	R2	R1	R2	R1	R2	R1	R2	R1	R2	R1	R2	R1	R2	R1	R2	Pos.	Pts
2006	Suzuki	QAT; Ret	QAT; Ret	AUS; Ret	AUS; 18	SPA; 15	SPA; 13	ITA; 13	ITA; 13	EUR; Ret	EUR; Ret	SMR; 13	SMR; 10	CZE; Ret	CZE; 20	GBR	GBR	NED	NED	GER	GER	ITA	ITA	FRA	FRA	20th	19
2014	Kawasaki	AUS; 12	AUS; 12	SPA; Ret	SPA; 15	NED; Ret	NED; Ret	ITA; 16	ITA; 15	GBR; 12	GBR; 18	MAL; Ret	MAL; Ret	SMR; Ret	SMR; Ret	POR; Ret	POR; DNS	USA	USA	SPA	SPA	FRA; 15	FRA; 11	QAT	QAT	20th	20

=== FIM Endurance World Championship ===
==== By team ====
Year	Team	Bike	Rider	TC
2001	(France) Honda Elf	Honda VTR1000SPW	(France) Fabien Foret (France) William Costes (France) Sebastien Gimbert (France) Sébastien Charpentier	3rd
2013	(France) SRC Kawasaki	Kawasaki ZX-10R	(France) Grégory Leblanc (France) Loris Baz (France) Jérémy Guarnoni (France) Nicolas Salchaud (France) Fabien Foret	3rd
2015	(France) SRC Kawasaki	Kawasaki ZX-10R	(France) Grégory Blanc (France) Fabien Foret (France) Mathieu Lagrive	3rd

Sporting positions
Preceded by Andrew Pitt	Supersport World Champion; 2002	Succeeded by Chris Vermeulen
