= 2003 Supersport World Championship =

2003 Supersport World Championship
Previous:	2002	Next:	2004
Support series: Superbike World Championship; Superstock European Championship

The 2003 Supersport World Championship was the seventh season of the Supersport World Championship. The season was held over 11 races following the Superbike World Championship calendar except a race at Laguna Seca. Beginning on 2 March at Circuit Ricardo Tormo in Spain, and finished on 19 October at Circuit de Nevers Magny-Cours in France. Chris Vermeulen won the title after beating closest rival Stéphane Chambon.

== Race calendar and results ==
2003 Calendar
Round	Date	Round	Circuit	Pole position	Fastest lap	Race winner	Winning team	Winning constructor
1	2 March	Spain	Circuit Ricardo Tormo	(Japan) Katsuaki Fujiwara	(Italy) Alessio Corradi	(Japan) Katsuaki Fujiwara	Alstare Suzuki	Suzuki
2	30 March	Australia	Phillip Island Circuit	(Australia) Chris Vermeulen	(Japan) Katsuaki Fujiwara	(Australia) Chris Vermeulen	Ten Kate Honda	Honda
3	27 April	Japan	Sportsland Sugo	(Japan) Katsuaki Fujiwara	(Germany) Christian Kellner	(Germany) Christian Kellner	Yamaha Deutschland	Yamaha
4	18 May	Italy	Autodromo Nazionale Monza	(Australia) Karl Muggeridge	(Australia) Chris Vermeulen	(Australia) Chris Vermeulen	Ten Kate Honda	Honda
5	1 June	Germany	Motorsport Arena Oschersleben	(Australia) Karl Muggeridge	(Japan) Katsuaki Fujiwara	(Australia) Chris Vermeulen	Ten Kate Honda	Honda
6	15 June	United Kingdom	Silverstone Circuit	(Netherlands) Jurgen van den Goorbergh	(Australia) Chris Vermeulen	(Australia) Chris Vermeulen	Ten Kate Honda	Honda
7	22 June	San Marino	Misano Adriatico	(Italy) Simone Sanna	(Japan) Katsuaki Fujiwara	(France) Fabien Foret	Kawasaki R.T. KRT	Kawasaki
8	27 July	(European Union) Europe	Brands Hatch	(France) Stéphane Chambon	(France) Stéphane Chambon	(France) Stéphane Chambon	Alstare Suzuki	Suzuki
9	7 September	Netherlands	TT Circuit Assen	(Australia) Chris Vermeulen	(Japan) Katsuaki Fujiwara	(Australia) Karl Muggeridge	Ten Kate Honda	Honda
10	28 September	Italy	Autodromo Enzo e Dino Ferrari	(Australia) Karl Muggeridge	(Australia) Kevin Curtain	(Australia) Karl Muggeridge	Ten Kate Honda	Honda
11	19 October	France	Circuit de Nevers Magny-Cours	(Australia) Chris Vermeulen	(Australia) Karl Muggeridge	(Australia) Karl Muggeridge	Ten Kate Honda	Honda

== Entry list ==
Team	Constructor	Motorcycle	No.	Rider	Rounds
Alpha Technik-Honda	Honda	Honda CBR600RR	81	(Germany) Michael Schulten	1, 5, 7, 11
Alpha Technik-Honda	Honda	Honda CBR600RR	82	(Germany) Tobias Kirmeier	1, 5, 7
Castrol Honda Racing	Honda	Honda CBR600RR	42	(Australia) Shannon Johnson	2
CRS Grand Prix	Honda	Honda CBR600RR	63	(Italy) Valter Bartolini	10
Dark Dog Honda BKM	Honda	Honda CBR600RR	12	(France) Christophe Cogan	1–8
Dark Dog Honda BKM	Honda	Honda CBR600RR	23	(Australia) Broc Parkes	1–8
Dark Dog Honda BKM	Honda	Honda CBR600RR	85	(Japan) Ryuichi Kiyonari	3
Ekerold Honda Racing	Honda	Honda CBR600RR	76	(South Africa) Jonnie Ekerold	6
Esha Kobutex Honda	Honda	Honda CBR600RR	86	(Netherlands) Barry Veneman	4–5, 8–9
Esha Kobutex Honda	Honda	Honda CBR600RR	94	(Sweden) Jan Hanson	4, 8–9
Moto 1	Honda	Honda CBR600RR	42	(Australia) Shannon Johnson	9–11
Moto 1	Honda	Honda CBR600RR	52	(France) Yoann Tiberio	11
Moto 1	Honda	Honda CBR600RR	55	(France) Frédéric Bolley	1
Moto 1	Honda	Honda CBR600RR	116	(France) Sébastien Charpentier	1
Piet Geluk Auto's	Honda	Honda CBR600RR	67	(Netherlands) Michel Van Kleef	9
Racing Team Vriezenveen	Honda	Honda CBR600RR	99	(Netherlands) René Winkel	9
Superbike Racing Team	Honda	Honda CBR600RR	62	(Italy) Jury Proietto	10
Team Klaffi Honda	Honda	Honda CBR600RR	18	(Austria) Robert Ulm	All
Team Klaffi Honda	Honda	Honda CBR600RR	24	(Italy) Gianluigi Scalvini	1–2
Team Klaffi Honda	Honda	Honda CBR600RR	56	(France) Frédéric Bolley	11
Team Klaffi Honda	Honda	Honda CBR600RR	116	(France) Sébastien Charpentier	3–11
Technical Sports Racing	Honda	Honda CBR600RR	72	(Japan) Takeshi Tsujimura	6
Ten Kate Honda	Honda	Honda CBR600RR	7	(Australia) Chris Vermeulen	All
Ten Kate Honda	Honda	Honda CBR600RR	23	(Australia) Broc Parkes	11
Ten Kate Honda	Honda	Honda CBR600RR	31	(United Kingdom) Karl Muggeridge	All
Van Zon Honda T.K.R.	Honda	Honda CBR600RR	9	(United Kingdom) Iain MacPherson	All
Van Zon Honda T.K.R.	Honda	Honda CBR600RR	71	(Belgium) Werner Daemen	All
Vitrans Honda TKR	Honda	Honda CBR600RR	28	(Australia) Dean Thomas	5–6, 8–9
Vitrans Honda TKR	Honda	Honda CBR600RR	30	(Republic of Ireland) Michael Laverty	5–6, 8–9
ART	Kawasaki	Kawasaki ZX-6R	68	(France) Julien Da Costa	11
Kawasaki Bertocchi	Kawasaki	Kawasaki ZX-6R	22	(Italy) Stefano Cruciani	All
Kawasaki R.T. KRT	Kawasaki	Kawasaki ZX-6R	1	(France) Fabien Foret	All
Kawasaki R.T. KRT	Kawasaki	Kawasaki ZX-6R	17	(Spain) Pere Riba	All
Monaco Moto Team	Kawasaki	Kawasaki ZX-6R	60	(France) Sebastien De Rosa	11
Saveko Racing Team	Kawasaki	Kawasaki ZX-6R	11	(Netherlands) Arno Visscher	4–7, 9–11
Saveko Racing Team	Kawasaki	Kawasaki ZX-6R	20	(Norway) Kai Børre Andersen	1–3
Saveko Racing Team	Kawasaki	Kawasaki ZX-6R	34	(Belgium) Didier Van Keymeulen	1–7, 9–11
Saveko Racing Team	Kawasaki	Kawasaki ZX-6R	66	(France) Laurent Brian	11
Alstare Suzuki	Suzuki	Suzuki GSX 600R	2	(Japan) Katsuaki Fujiwara	All
Alstare Suzuki	Suzuki	Suzuki GSX 600R	3	(France) Stéphane Chambon	All
Elf Yoshimura Schafer Motorsport	Suzuki	Suzuki GSX 600R	90	(Germany) Herbert Kaufmann	5
Hartelman Racing	Yamaha	Yamaha YZF R6	98	(Netherlands) Torleif Hartelman	9
Italia Spadaro F.R.	Yamaha	Yamaha YZF R6	15	(Italy) Alessio Corradi	1–10
Italia Spadaro F.R.	Yamaha	Yamaha YZF R6	64	(Italy) Denis Sacchetti	11
Italia Spadaro F.R.	Yamaha	Yamaha YZF R6	89	(Italy) Alessandro Polita	10
JR Motorsport	Yamaha	Yamaha YZF R6	75	(United Kingdom) Jamie Robinson	6, 8
Lorenzini by Leoni	Yamaha	Yamaha YZF R6	69	(Italy) Gianluca Nannelli	All
Max Moto Sport	Yamaha	Yamaha YZF R6	64	(Italy) Denis Sacchetti	10
Max Moto Sport	Yamaha	Yamaha YZF R6	78	(Italy) Camillo Mariottini	7
Nikon Yamaha Racing	Yamaha	Yamaha YZF R6	83	(Australia) Kevin Curtain	2
Northpoint	Yamaha	Yamaha YZF R6	95	(United Kingdom) Tom Sykes	8
Red Piranha Racing	Yamaha	Yamaha YZF R6	73	(United Kingdom) Simon Andrews	6
Start Team	Yamaha	Yamaha YZF R6	87	(Italy) Antonio Carlacci	4, 10
Team ICM	Yamaha	Yamaha YZF R6	33	(Italy) Massimo De Silvestro	1–2
Team Tienne	Yamaha	Yamaha YZF R6	88	(Italy) Ivan Goi	4, 7, 10
Team Trasimeno	Yamaha	Yamaha YZF R6	89	(Italy) Alessandro Polita	4, 7
Yamaha Belgarda	Yamaha	Yamaha YZF R6	4	(Netherlands) Jurgen van den Goorbergh	All
Yamaha Belgarda	Yamaha	Yamaha YZF R6	16	(Italy) Simone Sanna	All
Yamaha Belgarda	Yamaha	Yamaha YZF R6	84	(Japan) Tekkyū Kayō	3, 10
Yamaha Deutschland	Yamaha	Yamaha YZF R6	8	(Germany) Jörg Teuchert	All
Yamaha Deutschland	Yamaha	Yamaha YZF R6	80	(Turkey) Kenan Sofuoğlu	11
Yamaha Deutschland	Yamaha	Yamaha YZF R6	83	(Australia) Kevin Curtain	10
Yamaha Deutschland	Yamaha	Yamaha YZF R6	93	(Germany) Christian Kellner	All
Yamaha France - Ipone	Yamaha	Yamaha YZF R6	12	(France) Christophe Cogan	11
Yamaha France - Ipone	Yamaha	Yamaha YZF R6	21	(France) Matthieu Lagrive	All
Yamaha France - Ipone	Yamaha	Yamaha YZF R6	70	(France) Ludovic Holon	11
Yamaha France - Ipone	Yamaha	Yamaha YZF R6	77	(France) Thierry van den Bosch	All
Yamaha NL/Motoport Leek	Yamaha	Yamaha YZF R6	51	(Netherlands) Harry Van Beek	9
Yamaha Voiges	Yamaha	Yamaha YZF R6	80	(Turkey) Kenan Sofuoğlu	1, 5

Key
Regular rider
Wildcard rider
Replacement rider

== Championship' standings ==
=== Riders' standings ===
Pos	Rider	Bike	VAL (Spain)	PHI (Australia)	SUG (Japan)	MNZ (Italy)	OSC (Germany)	SIL (United Kingdom)	MIS (San Marino)	BRA (Europe)	ASS (Netherlands)	IMO (Italy)	MAG (France)	Pts
1	(Australia) Chris Vermeulen	Honda	2	1^{P}	5	1^{F}	1	1^{F}	Ret	6	2^{P}	2	2^{P}	201
2	(France) Stéphane Chambon	Suzuki	WD	4	3	4	2	Ret	4	1^{PF}	4	4	5	137
3	(Netherlands) Jurgen van den Goorbergh	Yamaha	9	3	8	2	4	2^{P}	Ret	2	Ret	3	3	136
4	(Australia) Karl Muggeridge	Honda	6	7	6	Ret^{P}	15^{P}	3	Ret	4	1	1^{P}	1^{F}	134
5	(Japan) Katsuaki Fujiwara	Suzuki	1^{P}	2^{F}	15^{P}	10	3^{F}	8	2^{F}	9	3^{F}	Ret	Ret	119
6	(Germany) Christian Kellner	Yamaha	8	12	1^{F}	7	8	11	6	7	16	12	8	90
7	(France) Sébastien Charpentier	Honda	WD		19	6	9	18	12	3	5	5	4	72
8	(Italy) Alessio Corradi	Yamaha	3^{F}	9	10	8	Ret	5	7	10	11	DNS		68
9	(France) Fabien Foret	Kawasaki	14	11	Ret	5	Ret	Ret	1	5	6	Ret	Ret	64
10	(Germany) Jörg Teuchert	Yamaha	5	6	Ret	Ret	7	Ret	5	8	7	14	WD	60
11	(Spain) Pere Riba	Kawasaki	11	8	9	9	6	7	Ret	13	Ret	Ret	6	59
12	(France) Christophe Cogan	Honda	4	13	11	12	Ret	6	9	14				51
12	(France) Christophe Cogan	Yamaha											9	51
13	(Australia) Broc Parkes	Honda	7	Ret	7	15	5	Ret	3	15			Ret	47
14	(United Kingdom) Iain MacPherson	Honda	18	Ret	17	3	Ret	Ret	14	11	Ret	8	DNS	31
15	(Italy) Gianluca Nannelli	Yamaha	DSQ	16	14	Ret	10	14	Ret	23	8	6	13	31
16	(France) Mathieu Lagrive	Yamaha	15	21	18	19	12	9	11	17	18	11	7	31
17	(Italy) Simone Sanna	Yamaha	12	15	13	14	Ret	Ret	8^{p}	Ret	Ret	10	11	29
18	(Belgium) Werner Daemen	Honda	10	14	12	17	Ret	15	Ret	Ret	9	Ret	10	26
19	(Austria) Robert Ulm	Honda	Ret	10	Ret	11	11	10	Ret	18	15	13	DNS	26
20	(Japan) Tekkyū Kayō	Yamaha			4							7		22
21	(Japan) Ryuichi Kiyonari	Honda			2									20
22	(France) Thierry van den Bosch	Yamaha	DNQ	18	16	Ret	Ret	4	Ret	24	17	DNS	Ret	13
23	(Australia) Kevin Curtain	Yamaha		5								Ret^{F}		11
24	(Netherlands) Barry Veneman	Honda				13	14			19	10			11
25	(Australia) Dean Thomas	Honda					13	13		Ret	13			9
26	(Italy) Antonio Carlacci	Yamaha				21						9		7
27	(Italy) Stefano Cruciani	Kawasaki	17	22	Ret	22	16	Ret	10	16	20	20	Ret	6
28	(Germany) Michael Schulten	Honda	13				WD		WD				14	5
29	(Japan) Takeshi Tsujimura	Honda						12						4
30	(United Kingdom) Tom Sykes	Yamaha								12				4
31	(France) Julien Da Costa	Kawasaki											12	4
32	(Republic of Ireland) Michael Laverty	Honda					17	Ret		21	12			4
33	(Italy) Alessandro Polita	Yamaha				16			13			15		4
34	(Sweden) Jan Hanson	Honda				WD				22	14			2
35	(France) Ludovic Holon	Yamaha											15	1
36	(Italy) Ivan Goi	Yamaha				18			15			Ret		1
	(Belgium) Didier Van Keymeulen	Kawasaki	20	20	Ret	20	Ret	19	18		19	16	18	0
	(Italy) Denis Sacchetti	Yamaha										18	16	0
	(United Kingdom) Jamie Robinson	Yamaha						16		20				0
	(Turkey) Kenan Sofuoğlu	Yamaha	16				Ret						Ret	0
	(Australia) Shannon Johnson	Honda		17							21	Ret	17	0
	(United Kingdom) Simon Andrews	Yamaha						16						0
	(Italy) Camillo Mariottini	Yamaha							17					0
	(Italy) Valter Bartolini	Honda										17		0
	(Germany) Herbert Kaufmann	Suzuki					18							0
	(Norway) Kai Børre Andersen	Kawasaki	19	19	Ret									0
	(Germany) Tobias Kirmeier	Honda	WD				19		WD					0
	(Italy) Jury Proietto	Honda										19		0
	(France) Sebastien De Rosa	Kawasaki											19	0
	(Netherlands) Arno Visscher	Kawasaki				23	20	20	Ret		24	Ret	20	0
	(Netherlands) Torleif Hartelman	Yamaha									22			0
	(Netherlands) Harry Van Beek	Yamaha									23			0
	(Netherlands) René Winkel	Honda									25			0
	(Netherlands) Michel Van Kleef	Honda									NC			0
	(Italy) Gianluigi Scalvini	Honda	Ret	Ret										0
	(South Africa) Jonnie Ekerold	Honda						Ret						0
	(France) Frédéric Bolley	Honda	WD										Ret	0
	(France) Laurent Brian	Kawasaki											Ret	0
	(France) Yoann Tiberio	Honda											Ret	0
	(Italy) Massimo De Silvestro	Yamaha	WD	WD										
Pos	Rider	Bike	VAL (Spain)	PHI (Australia)	SUG (Japan)	MNZ (Italy)	OSC (Germany)	SIL (United Kingdom)	MIS (San Marino)	BRA (Europe)	ASS (Netherlands)	IMO (Italy)	MAG (France)	Pts

Colour	Result
Gold	Winner
Silver	Second place
Bronze	Third place
Green	Points classification
Blue	Non-points classification
Blue	Non-classified finish (NC)
Purple	Retired, not classified (Ret)
Red	Did not qualify (DNQ)
Red	Did not pre-qualify (DNPQ)
Black	Disqualified (DSQ)
White	Did not start (DNS)
White	Withdrew (WD)
White	Race cancelled (C)
Blank	Did not practice (DNP)
Blank	Did not arrive (DNA)
Blank	Excluded (EX)

P – Pole position
F – Fastest lap
Source :
