= 2002 Supersport World Championship =

2002 Supersport World Championship
Previous:	2001	Next:	2003
Support series: Superbike World Championship; Superstock European Championship

The 2002 Supersport World Championship was the sixth season of the Supersport World Championship. The season was held over 12 races following the Superbike World Championship calendar except a race at Laguna Seca. Beginning on 10 March at Circuit Ricardo Tormo in Spain, and finished on 29 September at Autodromo Enzo e Dino Ferrari in Italy.

Frenchman Fabien Foret won the title after beating the closest rival Katsuaki Fujiwara.

== Race calendar and results ==
Round	Date	Round	Circuit	Pole position	Fastest lap	Race winner	Winning team	Winning constructor
1	10 March	Spain	Circuit Ricardo Tormo	(France) Fabien Foret	(France) Fabien Foret	(France) Fabien Foret	Ten Kate Honda	Honda
2	24 March	Australia	Phillip Island Circuit	(Australia) Andrew Pitt	(Italy) Piergiorgio Bontempi	(Australia) Andrew Pitt	Kawasaki Racing	Kawasaki
3	7 April	South Africa	Kyalami	(France) Stéphane Chambon	(United Kingdom) James Whitham	(Australia) Andrew Pitt	Kawasaki Racing	Kawasaki
4	21 April	Japan	Sportsland Sugo	(Japan) Katsuaki Fujiwara	(France) Fabien Foret	(France) Stéphane Chambon	Alstare Suzuki Corona	Suzuki
5	12 May	Italy	Autodromo Nazionale Monza	(Australia) Chris Vermeulen	(France) Fabien Foret	(France) Fabien Foret	Ten Kate Honda	Honda
6	26 May	(United Kingdom) Great Britain	Silverstone Circuit	(France) Fabien Foret	(United Kingdom) James Whitham	(United Kingdom) James Whitham	Yamaha Belgarda	Yamaha
7	9 June	Germany	Lausitzring	(France) Fabien Foret	(Japan) Katsuaki Fujiwara	(Japan) Katsuaki Fujiwara	Alstare Suzuki Corona	Suzuki
8	23 June	San Marino	Autodromo di Santa Monica	(France) Fabien Foret	(France) Stéphane Chambon	(France) Fabien Foret	Ten Kate Honda	Honda
9	28 July	Europe	Brands Hatch	(France) Fabien Foret	(United Kingdom) Iain MacPherson	(Japan) Katsuaki Fujiwara	Alstare Suzuki Corona	Suzuki
10	1 September	Germany	Motorsport Arena Oschersleben	(Japan) Katsuaki Fujiwara	(Germany) Christian Kellner	(Italy) Paolo Casoli	Yamaha Belgarda	Yamaha
11	8 September	Netherlands	TT Circuit Assen	(Australia) Chris Vermeulen	(France) Fabien Foret	(France) Fabien Foret	Ten Kate Honda	Honda
12	29 September	Italy	Autodromo Enzo e Dino Ferrari	(France) Fabien Foret	(Australia) Chris Vermeulen	(Japan) Katsuaki Fujiwara	Alstare Suzuki Corona	Suzuki

== Entry list ==
Team	Constructor	Motorcycle	No.	Rider	Rounds
Ducati NCR Nortel Net.	Ducati	Ducati 748 R	11	(Italy) Piergiorgio Bontempi	All
Ducati NCR Nortel Net.	Ducati	Ducati 748 R	77	(Italy) Giovanni Bussei	11–12
Monster Mob Ducati	Ducati	Ducati 748 R	54	(United Kingdom) Stuart Easton	6, 9
Rox Racing	Ducati	Ducati 748 R	16	(Italy) Gianluca Nannelli	All
Shell Advance Racing	Ducati	Ducati 748 R	26	(Germany) Rico Penzkofer	1, 5–7, 9–12
UUNET Ducati	Ducati	Ducati 748 R	35	(South Africa) Trevor Crookes	3
Alpha Technik Honda	Honda	Honda CBR 600F	85	(Germany) Jürgen Oelschläger	10
BKM Honda Racing	Honda	Honda CBR 600F	13	(France) Christophe Cogan	All
BKM Honda Racing	Honda	Honda CBR 600F	18	(Spain) José David de Gea	4–7
BKM Honda Racing	Honda	Honda CBR 600F	45	(France) Brian Laurent	10–12
BKM Honda Racing	Honda	Honda CBR 600F	70	(Australia) Nigel Arnold	8–9
BKM Honda Racing	Honda	Honda CBR 600F	81	(Austria) Robert Ulm	1–3
Dave Siedel Racing	Honda	Honda CBR 600F	55	(United Kingdom) Ben Wilson	6
Dynamic Exp. S. Compaq	Honda	Honda CBR 600F	32	(South Africa) Arushen Moodley	3
Esha-Kobutex	Honda	Honda CBR 600F	51	(Netherlands) Kyro Verstraeten	6–7
Esha-Kobutex	Honda	Honda CBR 600F	60	(Netherlands) Ron Van Steenbergen	7
Esha-Kobutex	Honda	Honda CBR 600F	94	(Sweden) Jan Hanson	10–11
Honda UK Race	Honda	Honda CBR 600F	7	(Australia) Karl Muggeridge	All
Honda UK Race	Honda	Honda CBR 600F	10	(United Kingdom) John McGuinness	1, 3, 5–6, 8–11
Honda UK Race	Honda	Honda CBR 600F	39	(Japan) Tatsuya Yamaguchi	4
Honda UK Race	Honda	Honda CBR 600F	59	(Republic of Ireland) Michael Laverty	12
Honda UK Race	Honda	Honda CBR 600F	81	(Austria) Robert Ulm	7
Moto 1	Honda	Honda CBR 600F	116	(France) Sébastien Charpentier	5–11
Norwood Adam Honda	Honda	Honda CBR 600F	53	(United Kingdom) Scott Smart	6, 9
Superbike Racing	Honda	Honda CBR 600F	73	(Italy) Juri Proietto	12
Ten Kate Honda	Honda	Honda CBR 600F	9	(United Kingdom) Iain MacPherson	All
Ten Kate Honda	Honda	Honda CBR 600F	99	(France) Fabien Foret	All
Van-zon-Honda-T.K.R.	Honda	Honda CBR 600F	17	(Australia) Chris Vermeulen	All
Van-zon-Honda-T.K.R.	Honda	Honda CBR 600F	71	(Belgium) Werner Daemen	1–7, 9–11
Van-zon-Honda-T.K.R.	Honda	Honda CBR 600F	74	(United Kingdom) Paul Young	12
Van-zon-Honda-T.K.R.	Honda	Honda CBR 600F	81	(Austria) Robert Ulm	8
Weger Racing	Honda	Honda CBR 600F	19	(Germany) Alexander Schlaefke	1–2, 5, 7
Weger Racing	Honda	Honda CBR 600F	58	(United Kingdom) Jon Kirkham	6
Kawasaki Racing	Kawasaki	Kawasaki ZX-6R	1	(Australia) Andrew Pitt	All
Kawasaki Racing	Kawasaki	Kawasaki ZX-6R	8	(United Kingdom) James Ellison	All
Alstare Suzuki Corona	Suzuki	Suzuki GSX-R600	12	(France) Stéphane Chambon	All
Alstare Suzuki Corona	Suzuki	Suzuki GSX-R600	37	(Japan) Katsuaki Fujiwara	All
Cell C Suzuki	Suzuki	Suzuki GSX-R600	31	(South Africa) Greg Dreyer	3
Cell C Suzuki	Suzuki	Suzuki GSX-R600	34	(South Africa) Stewart MacLeod	3
Cooper Racing	Suzuki	Suzuki GSX-R600	30	(Australia) Adam Fergusson	2
D.N.R.	Suzuki	Suzuki GSX-R600	67	(Italy) Norino Brignola	8
Earnshaws Motorcycles	Suzuki	Suzuki GSX-R600	56	(United Kingdom) Tom Tunstall	6
Merces Cura Racing	Suzuki	Suzuki GSX-R600	38	(South Africa) Graeme Van Breda	3
NHR	Suzuki	Suzuki GSX-R600	36	(South Africa) Noel Haarhoff	3
Biomagnetic Sport	Yamaha	Yamaha YZF-R6	28	(Australia) Daniel Stauffer	2
GIMotorsport	Yamaha	Yamaha YZF-R6	14	(Italy) Diego Giugovaz	1–8
GIMotorsport	Yamaha	Yamaha YZF-R6	40	(Italy) Lorenzo Segoni	12
GIMotorsport	Yamaha	Yamaha YZF-R6	41	(Italy) Giovanni Valtulini	11
GIMotorsport	Yamaha	Yamaha YZF-R6	64	(Italy) Claudio Cipriani	5–12
Imperiale	Yamaha	Yamaha YZF-R6	66	(Italy) Cristian Magnani	8
Laaks CET Racing	Yamaha	Yamaha YZF-R6	98	(Germany) Michael Schulten	10
OPCM Racing	Yamaha	Yamaha YZF-R6	5	(Australia) Kevin Curtain	All
OPCM Racing	Yamaha	Yamaha YZF-R6	81	(Austria) Robert Ulm	10–12
OPCM Racing	Yamaha	Yamaha YZF-R6	118	(Austria) Christian Zaiser	5–8
Parl Moto	Yamaha	Yamaha YZF-R6	68	(Italy) Camillo Mariottini	8
Podium Racing	Yamaha	Yamaha YZF-R6	92	(Sweden) Christer Lindholm	11
Saveko Racing	Yamaha	Yamaha YZF-R6	21	(United Kingdom) Jim Moodie	1
Saveko Racing	Yamaha	Yamaha YZF-R6	22	(Australia) Damian Cudlin	2
Saveko Racing	Yamaha	Yamaha YZF-R6	25	(Australia) Mark Willis	4
Saveko Racing	Yamaha	Yamaha YZF-R6	33	(United Kingdom) Robert Frost	All
Saveko Racing	Yamaha	Yamaha YZF-R6	42	(France) Matthieu Lagrive	5–12
Team Italia Lorenzini by Leoni	Yamaha	Yamaha YZF-R6	20	(Italy) Stefano Cruciani	All
Team Italia Lorenzini by Leoni	Yamaha	Yamaha YZF-R6	44	(Italy) Antonio Carlacci	All
Team Italia Spadaro	Yamaha	Yamaha YZF-R6	15	(Italy) Alessio Corradi	All
Veneman Yamaha Motor NLD	Yamaha	Yamaha YZF-R6	72	(Netherlands) Barry Veneman	11
Yamaha Belgarda	Yamaha	Yamaha YZF-R6	2	(Italy) Paolo Casoli	All
Yamaha Belgarda	Yamaha	Yamaha YZF-R6	24	(Italy) Gianluigi Scalvini	10
Yamaha Belgarda	Yamaha	Yamaha YZF-R6	69	(United Kingdom) James Whitham	All
Yamaha Motor Germany	Yamaha	Yamaha YZF-R6	3	(Germany) Jörg Teuchert	All
Yamaha Motor Germany	Yamaha	Yamaha YZF-R6	91	(Germany) Christian Kellner	All
Yamaha Motor NLD	Yamaha	Yamaha YZF-R6	65	(Netherlands) Harry Van Beek	11

Key
Regular rider
Wildcard rider
Replacement rider

== Championship' standings ==
=== Riders' standings ===
Pos	Rider	Bike	VAL (Spain)	PHI (Australia)	KYA (South Africa)	SUG (Japan)	MNZ (Italy)	SIL (United Kingdom)	LAU (Germany)	MIS (San Marino)	BRA (Europe)	OSC (Germany)	ASS (Netherlands)	IMO (Italy)	Pts
1	(France) Fabien Foret	Honda	1^{PF}	9	5	3^{F}	1^{F}	7^{p}	DSQ^{P}	1^{P}	2^{P}	6	1^{F}	4^{P}	186
2	(Japan) Katsuaki Fujiwara	Suzuki	17	4	Ret	2^{P}	3	6	1^{F}	2	1	3^{P}	5	1	181
3	(France) Stéphane Chambon	Suzuki	2	3	3^{P}	1	5	8	3	13^{F}	Ret	2	9	2	162
4	(Italy) Paolo Casoli	Yamaha	8	Ret	7	4	6	2	DSQ	5	3	1	3	Ret	128
5	(Australia) Andrew Pitt	Kawasaki	5	1^{P}	1	7	4	Ret	2	6	18	4	Ret	Ret	126
6	(Germany) Christian Kellner	Yamaha	3	6	6	5	Ret	11	4	4	6	Ret^{F}	10	DNS	94
7	(Australia) Chris Vermeulen	Honda	4	11	9	Ret	2^{P}	14	5	8	8	Ret	Ret^{P}	3^{F}	90
8	(Germany) Jörg Teuchert	Yamaha	16	5	4	10	9	4	6	Ret	5	Ret	8	5	90
9	(United Kingdom) Iain MacPherson	Honda	Ret	8	8	Ret	8	5	10	Ret	4^{F}	Ret	2	7	83
10	(United Kingdom) James Whitham	Yamaha	6	Ret	2^{F}	Ret	Ret	1^{F}	DSQ	3	Ret	WD	7	DSQ	80
11	(Australia) Kevin Curtain	Yamaha	Ret	12	Ret	9	Ret	Ret	7	11	9	5	4	WD	56
12	(Italy) Alessio Corradi	Yamaha	7	10	10	11	Ret	18	11	10	7	8	14	Ret	56
13	(Italy) Piergiorgio Bontempi	Ducati	11	2^{F}	11	Ret	7	Ret	9	14	Ret	Ret	13	Ret	51
14	(Australia) Karl Muggeridge	Honda	14	Ret	13	6	Ret	3	14	16	Ret	Ret	6	Ret	43
15	(France) Christophe Cogan	Honda	Ret	7	12	Ret	Ret	Ret	Ret	7	Ret	Ret	11	9	34
16	(Italy) Stefano Cruciani	Yamaha	Ret	17	Ret	14	Ret	12	8	12	11	DSQ	21	8	31
17	(Belgium) Werner Daemen	Honda	10	14	14	8	10	17	DNQ		12	Ret	15		29
18	(Austria) Robert Ulm	Honda	13	13	Ret				12	9					25
18	(Austria) Robert Ulm	Yamaha										Ret	12	12	25
19	(Italy) Antonio Carlacci	Yamaha	9	20	Ret	15	14	22	16	Ret	DSQ	Ret	23	6	20
20	(United Kingdom) James Ellison	Kawasaki	15	15	Ret	13	Ret	Ret	Ret	17	13	9	16	11	20
21	(France) Matthieu Lagrive	Yamaha					11	10	Ret	Ret	19	12	17	13	18
22	(Italy) Gianluca Nannelli	Ducati	12	16	18	Ret	12	13	17	Ret	Ret	15	DNS	Ret	12
23	(Italy) Diego Giugovaz	Yamaha	18	19	19	17	13	9	Ret	24					10
24	(Sweden) Jan Hanson	Honda										7	DNS		9
25	(Germany) Jürgen Oelschläger	Honda										10			6
26	(United Kingdom) Robert Frost	Yamaha	Ret	Ret	Ret	Ret	DNS	21	Ret	19	Ret	Ret	18	10	6
27	(United Kingdom) Stuart Easton	Ducati						Ret			10				6
28	(France) Sébastien Charpentier	Honda					15	16	DNQ	22	14	13	Ret		6
29	(France) Laurent Brian	Honda										11	24	16	5
30	(Spain) José David de Gea	Honda				12	18	23	15						5
31	(United Kingdom) John McGuinness	Honda	19		DNS		17	15		Ret	15	14	26		4
32	(Austria) Christian Zaiser	Yamaha					16	20	13	18					3
33	(United Kingdom) Paul Young	Honda												14	2
34	(South Africa) Arushen Moodley	Honda			15										1
35	(Italy) Camillo Mariottini	Yamaha								15					1
36	(Republic of Ireland) Michael Laverty	Honda												15	1
	(South Africa) Noel Haarhoff	Suzuki			16										0
	(Australia) Mark Willis	Yamaha				16									0
	(Italy) Claudio Cipriani	Yamaha					Ret	24	18	23	17	16	27	18	0
	(Australia) Nigel Arnold	Honda								Ret	16				0
	(South Africa) Graeme Van Breda	Suzuki			17										0
	(Italy) Juri Proietto	Honda												17	0
	(Australia) Daniel Stauffer	Yamaha		18											0
	(Germany) Rico Penzkofer	Ducati	20				WD	DNS	19		WD	Ret	DNS	WD	0
	(Italy) Giovanni Bussei	Ducati											19	Ret	0
	(Netherlands) Kyro Verstraeten	Honda						19	DNS						0
	(Italy) Cristian Magnani	Yamaha								20					0
	(Netherlands) Barry Veneman	Yamaha											20		0
	(Italy) Norino Brignola	Suzuki								21					0
	(Sweden) Christer Lindholm	Yamaha											22		0
	(United Kingdom) Jon Kirkham	Honda						25							0
	(Netherlands) Harry Van Beek	Yamaha											25		0
	(United Kingdom) Jim Moodie	Yamaha	Ret												0
	(Australia) Adam Fergusson	Suzuki		Ret											0
	(Australia) Damian Cudlin	Yamaha		Ret											0
	(South Africa) Greg Dreyer	Suzuki			Ret										0
	(South Africa) Stewart MacLeod	Suzuki			Ret										0
	(South Africa) Trevor Crookes	Ducati			Ret										0
	(Japan) Tatsuya Yamaguchi	Honda				Ret									0
	(United Kingdom) Ben Wilson	Honda						Ret							0
	(United Kingdom) Tom Tunstall	Suzuki						Ret							0
	(Netherlands) Ron Van Steenbergen	Honda							Ret						0
	(United Kingdom) Scott Smart	Honda						WD			Ret				0
	(Germany) Michael Schulten	Yamaha										Ret			0
	(Italy) Lorenzo Segoni	Yamaha												Ret	0
	(Italy) Gianluigi Scalvini	Yamaha										DNS			
	(Germany) Alexander Schlaefke	Honda	DNQ	DNQ			WD		WD						
	(Italy) Giovanni Valtulini	Yamaha											DNQ		
Pos	Rider	Bike	VAL (Spain)	PHI (Australia)	KYA (South Africa)	SUG (Japan)	MNZ (Italy)	SIL (United Kingdom)	LAU (Germany)	MIS (San Marino)	BRA (Europe)	OSC (Germany)	ASS (Netherlands)	IMO (Italy)	Pts

Colour	Result
Gold	Winner
Silver	Second place
Bronze	Third place
Green	Points classification
Blue	Non-points classification
Blue	Non-classified finish (NC)
Purple	Retired, not classified (Ret)
Red	Did not qualify (DNQ)
Red	Did not pre-qualify (DNPQ)
Black	Disqualified (DSQ)
White	Did not start (DNS)
White	Withdrew (WD)
White	Race cancelled (C)
Blank	Did not practice (DNP)
Blank	Did not arrive (DNA)
Blank	Excluded (EX)

P – Pole position
F – Fastest lap
