= 2001 Supersport World Championship =

2001 Supersport World Championship
Previous:	2000	Next:	2002
Support series: Superbike World Championship; Superstock European Championship

The 2001 Supersport World Championship was the fifth season of the Supersport World Championship. The season was held over 11 races following the Superbike World Championship calendar except two races at Kyalami and Laguna Seca. Beginning on 11 March at Circuit Ricardo Tormo in Spain, and finished on 30 September at Autodromo Enzo e Dino Ferrari in Italy.

Andrew Pitt won the title after beating closest rival Paolo Casoli.

== Race calendar and results ==
Round	Date	Round	Circuit	Pole position	Fastest lap	Race winner	Winning team	Winning constructor
1	11 March	Spain	Circuit Ricardo Tormo	(France) Fabien Foret	(Spain) Pere Riba	(Spain) Pere Riba	Ten Kate Honda	Honda
2	22 April	Australia	Phillip Island Circuit	(Italy) Paolo Casoli	(United Kingdom) Iain MacPherson	(Australia) Kevin Curtain	BKM Honda	Honda
3	29 April	Japan	Sportsland Sugo	(Italy) Paolo Casoli	(United Kingdom) James Whitham	(Italy) Paolo Casoli	Yamaha Belgarda	Yamaha
4	13 May	Italy	Autodromo Nazionale Monza	(Italy) Vittoriano Guareschi	(Australia) Andrew Pitt	(United Kingdom) James Whitham	Yamaha Belgarda	Yamaha
5	27 May	(United Kingdom) Great Britain	Donington Park	(Italy) Vittoriano Guareschi	(Italy) Paolo Casoli	(Italy) Paolo Casoli	Yamaha Belgarda	Yamaha
6	10 June	Germany	Lausitzring	(France) Fabien Foret	(France) Fabien Foret	(Australia) Kevin Curtain	BKM Honda	Honda
7	24 June	San Marino	Autodromo Di Santa Monica	(United Kingdom) Iain MacPherson	(United Kingdom) Iain MacPherson	(Germany) Jörg Teuchert	Wilbers Suspension	Yamaha
8	29 July	(European Union) Europe	Brands Hatch	(United Kingdom) James Whitham	(Australia) Karl Muggeridge	(Germany) Jörg Teuchert	Wilbers Suspension	Yamaha
9	2 September	Germany	Motorsport Arena Oschersleben	(France) Fabien Foret	(United Kingdom) James Whitham	(France) Fabien Foret	Ten Kate Honda	Honda
10	9 September	Netherlands	TT Circuit Assen	(Japan) Katsuaki Fujiwara	(Australia) Kevin Curtain	(Italy) Paolo Casoli	Yamaha Belgarda	Yamaha
11	30 September	Italy	Autodromo Enzo e Dino Ferrari	(Australia) Karl Muggeridge	(France) Fabien Foret	(France) Fabien Foret	Ten Kate Honda	Honda

== Entry list ==
Team	Constructor	Motorcycle	No.	Rider	Rounds
Deutsche Shell AG; Shell Advance Racing	Ducati	Ducati 748	49	(Germany) Rico Penzkofer	6, 9
DFX Ducati	Ducati	Ducati 748	44	(Italy) Antonio Carlacci	1–4, 8–11
DFX Ducati	Ducati	Ducati 748	52	(France) David Muscat	6
DFX Ducati	Ducati	Ducati 748	56	(Italy) Roberto Antonello	7
Dienza Ducati Racing	Ducati	Ducati 748	22	(Italy) Vittoriano Guareschi	All
Dienza Ducati Racing	Ducati	Ducati 748	23	(Australia) Dean Thomas	All
Ducati NCR	Ducati	Ducati 748	25	(Germany) Markus Barth	11
Ducati NCR	Ducati	Ducati 748	36	(Italy) Ivan Mengozzi	1
Ducati NCR	Ducati	Ducati 748	53	(Italy) Camillo Mariottini	6–7
Ducati NCR	Ducati	Ducati 748	63	(South Africa) Brad Anassis	2
Ducati NCR	Ducati	Ducati 748	63	(Japan) Toshiyuki Hamaguchi	3–4
Foundation	Ducati	Ducati 748	39	(Japan) Takashi Toda	3
Lucky Ducati	Ducati	Ducati 748	18	(Italy) Cristiano Migliorati	1
Lucky Ducati	Ducati	Ducati 748	86	(Italy) Matteo Campana	1
Alpha Technick Castrol	Honda	Honda CBR600RR	24	(Australia) Adam Fergusson	2–11
Alpha Technick Castrol	Honda	Honda CBR600RR	25	(Germany) Markus Barth	1–7
Alpha Technick Castrol	Honda	Honda CBR600RR	32	(Australia) Alex Gobert	1
Alpha Technick Castrol	Honda	Honda CBR600RR	68	(United Kingdom) Steve Plater	8–11
BKM Honda	Honda	Honda CBR600RR	11	(Australia) Kevin Curtain	All
BKM Honda	Honda	Honda CBR600RR	18	(Italy) Cristiano Migliorati	4–11
BKM Honda	Honda	Honda CBR600RR	26	(Italy) Ivan Goi	1–3
Castrol Honda	Honda	Honda CBR600RR	21	(Australia) Chris Vermeulen	All
Moto 1 Honda Elf Dho	Honda	Honda CBR600RR	28	(Belgium) Sébastien Le Grelle	1–8
Moto 1 Honda Elf Dho	Honda	Honda CBR600RR	40	(Australia) Shannon Johnson	4–11
Moto 1 Honda Elf Dho	Honda	Honda CBR600RR	59	(Netherlands) Kyro Verstraeten	9–11
Ten Kate Honda	Honda	Honda CBR600RR	7	(Spain) Pere Riba	All
Ten Kate Honda	Honda	Honda CBR600RR	99	(France) Fabien Foret	All
Van der Velde-Kobute	Honda	Honda CBR600RR	75	(Netherlands) Wim Theunissen	10
Kawasaki Racing; Fuchs Kawasaki	Kawasaki	Kawasaki ZX-6R	6	(United Kingdom) Iain MacPherson	All
Kawasaki Racing; Fuchs Kawasaki	Kawasaki	Kawasaki ZX-6R	8	(Australia) Andrew Pitt	All
2000 Racing	Suzuki	Suzuki GSX-R600	43	(Italy) Gianfranco Guareschi	4
Crescent Suzuki	Suzuki	Suzuki GSX-R600	49	(United Kingdom) Karl Harris	5, 8
DMR Suzuki Italia	Suzuki	Suzuki GSX-R600	9	(Italy) Fabrizio Pirovano	All
DMR Suzuki Italia	Suzuki	Suzuki GSX-R600	31	(Italy) Vittorio Iannuzzo	All
Karthin Altzschner S	Suzuki	Suzuki GSX-R600	50	(Germany) Stefan Nebel	6
Scott Smart Racing	Suzuki	Suzuki GSX-R600	88	(United Kingdom) Scott Smart	5
Steinhausen Racing	Suzuki	Suzuki GSX-R600	51	(Germany) Jürgen Oelschläger	6
Suzuki Alstare Corona	Suzuki	Suzuki GSX-R600	5	(Australia) Karl Muggeridge	All
Suzuki Alstare Corona	Suzuki	Suzuki GSX-R600	37	(Japan) Katsuaki Fujiwara	All
Yoshimura Suzuki GP1	Suzuki	Suzuki GSX-R600	38	(Japan) Osamu Deguchi	3
Belart Motorsport	Yamaha	Yamaha YZF-R6	29	(Spain) Eduard Ullastres	1
Folch Endurance	Yamaha	Yamaha YZF-R6	30	(Spain) Alex Hervas	1
GimMotor Sport	Yamaha	Yamaha YZF-R6	17	(Italy) Ivan Clementi	All
GimMotor Sport	Yamaha	Yamaha YZF-R6	19	(Spain) Augustin Escobar	1–5, 7
GimMotor Sport	Yamaha	Yamaha YZF-R6	54	(Italy) Alessandro Polita	6
GimMotor Sport	Yamaha	Yamaha YZF-R6	54	(Italy) Alessandro Polita	7
GimMotor Sport	Yamaha	Yamaha YZF-R6	55	(Italy) Nello Russo	9–10
GimMotor Sport	Yamaha	Yamaha YZF-R6	67	(Italy) Franco Brugnara	8, 11
Italia Alpha Centaur	Yamaha	Yamaha YZF-R6	42	(Italy) Alessio Corradi	4, 7
Lightspeed/Ducci Pro	Yamaha	Yamaha YZF-R6	57	(France) Arnaud Van Den Bossche	7–8
Lightspeed/Ducci Pro	Yamaha	Yamaha YZF-R6	71	(Italy) Davide Bulega	3–8, 11
Lightspeed/Ducci Pro	Yamaha	Yamaha YZF-R6	72	(United Kingdom) Dennis Hobbs	5
Lightspeed/Ducci Pro	Yamaha	Yamaha YZF-R6	73	(Italy) Alessandro Pizzagalli	3–4
Parimotor	Yamaha	Yamaha YZF-R6	53	(Italy) Camillo Mariottini	11
Parimotor	Yamaha	Yamaha YZF-R6	55	(Italy) Nello Russo	7
RadarsTeam Yamaha	Yamaha	Yamaha YZF-R6	33	(Australia) Robbie Baird	2
RadarsTeam Yamaha	Yamaha	Yamaha YZF-R6	34	(Australia) Jamie Stauffer	2
Saveko Dee Cee Jeans	Yamaha	Yamaha YZF-R6	14	(France) Christophe Cogan	1–10
Saveko Dee Cee Jeans	Yamaha	Yamaha YZF-R6	65	(Sweden) Jan Hanson	All
Saveko Dee Cee Jeans	Yamaha	Yamaha YZF-R6	77	(United Kingdom) Rob Frost	11
T.Italia Lorenzini	Yamaha	Yamaha YZF-R6	12	(Italy) Piergiorgio Bontempi	All
T.Italia Lorenzini	Yamaha	Yamaha YZF-R6	35	(Italy) Stefano Cruciani	All
V&M Yamaha	Yamaha	Yamaha YZF-R6	45	(United Kingdom) Matt Llewellyn	5, 8
Wilbers Suspension	Yamaha	Yamaha YZF-R6	1	(Germany) Jörg Teuchert	All
Wilbers Suspension	Yamaha	Yamaha YZF-R6	4	(Germany) Christian Kellner	All
Yamaha Belgarda	Yamaha	Yamaha YZF-R6	2	(Italy) Paolo Casoli	All
Yamaha Belgarda	Yamaha	Yamaha YZF-R6	69	(United Kingdom) James Whitham	All
Yamaha Belgium	Yamaha	Yamaha YZF-R6	15	(Belgium) Werner Daemen	All
Yamaha Belgium	Yamaha	Yamaha YZF-R6	16	(Sweden) Christer Lindholm	All
Yamaha d'Antin	Yamaha	Yamaha YZF-R6	19	(Spain) Augustin Escobar	8, 10–11
Yamaha d'Antin	Yamaha	Yamaha YZF-R6	79	(Spain) Oriol Fernandez	11
Yamaha Laaks Racing	Yamaha	Yamaha YZF-R6	58	(Germany) Michael Schulten	9
Yamaha Motors Nederland	Yamaha	Yamaha YZF-R6	74	(Netherlands) Harry Van Beek	10

Key
Regular rider
Wildcard rider
Replacement rider

== Championship' standings ==
=== Riders' standings ===
Pos	Rider	Bike	VAL (Spain)	PHI (Australia)	SUG (Japan)	MNZ (Italy)	DON (United Kingdom)	LAU (Germany)	MIS (San Marino)	BRA (Europe)	OSC (Germany)	ASS (Netherlands)	IMO (Italy)	Pts
1	(Australia) Andrew Pitt	Kawasaki	11	3	3	4^{F}	10	3	8	2	3	2	4	149
2	(Italy) Paolo Casoli	Yamaha	12	7^{P}	1^{P}	2	1^{F}	15	3	7	4	1	Ret	147
3	(Germany) Jörg Teuchert	Yamaha	Ret	8	2	6	3	7	1	1	Ret	4	7	135
4	(United Kingdom) James Whitham	Yamaha	Ret	Ret	Ret^{F}	1	4	Ret	7	3^{P}	5^{F}	3	3	106
5	(Australia) Kevin Curtain	Honda	5	1	6	14	8	1	Ret	11	12	6^{F}	14	102
6	(Spain) Pere Riba	Honda	1^{F}	5	4	Ret	12	Ret	Ret	6	2	Ret	5	94
7	(Australia) Karl Muggeridge	Suzuki	6	Ret	5	3	2	Ret	9	Ret^{F}	8	Ret	2^{P}	92
8	(France) Fabien Foret	Honda	15^{P}	19	8	Ret	11	Ret^{PF}	4	9	1^{P}	10	1^{F}	90
9	(United Kingdom) Iain MacPherson	Kawasaki	20	Ret^{F}	10	5	14	6	2^{PF}	Ret	Ret	8	6	67
10	(Italy) Fabrizio Pirovano	Suzuki	9	Ret	7	8	9	Ret	Ret	5	7	5	11	67
11	(Italy) Piergiorgio Bontempi	Yamaha	2	14	Ret	9	6	Ret	10	Ret	14	12	9	58
12	(Japan) Katsuaki Fujiwara	Suzuki	4	Ret	Ret	13	5	Ret	6	4	Ret	Ret^{P}	8	58
13	(France) Christophe Cogan	Yamaha	7	10	13	12	13	5	12	Ret	9	9		54
14	(Germany) Christian Kellner	Yamaha	3	16	9	Ret	Ret	9	Ret	10	6	11	17	51
15	(Australia) Adam Fergusson	Honda		2	Ret	19	20	2	Ret	15	10	14	16	49
16	(Italy) Vittoriano Guareschi	Ducati	8	4	Ret	7^{P}	Ret^{P}	4	Ret	Ret	Ret	20	Ret	43
17	(Australia) Chris Vermeulen	Honda	Ret	Ret	14	NC	Ret	8	5	16	Ret	16	10	27
18	(Italy) Vittorio Iannuzzo	Suzuki	19	15	12	16	18	Ret	Ret	14	Ret	7	12	20
19	(Germany) Werner Daemen	Yamaha	10	Ret	Ret	Ret	Ret	10	15	13	Ret	13	Ret	19
20	(Italy) Cristiano Migliorati	Ducati	17											18
20	(Italy) Cristiano Migliorati	Honda				11	16	11	Ret	12	Ret	15	13	18
21	(United Kingdom) Karl Harris	Suzuki					7			8				17
22	(Australia) Dean Thomas	Ducati	Ret	6	Ret	Ret	17	Ret	17	17	11	17	Ret	15
23	(Sweden) Christer Lindholm	Yamaha	13	11	17	18	Ret	12	18	24	Ret	18	18	12
24	(Italy) Alessio Corradi	Yamaha				10			13					9
25	(Italy) Ivan Goi	Honda	23	9	20									7
26	(Sweden) Jan Hanson	Yamaha	14	Ret	11	DNS	25	Ret	19	21	16	19	Ret	7
27	(Italy) Nello Russo	Yamaha							11		19	23		5
28	(Germany) Markus Barth	Honda	16	13	Ret	Ret	23	14	Ret					5
28	(Germany) Markus Barth	Ducati											Ret	5
29	(Australia) Robbie Baird	Yamaha		12										4
30	(Germany) Jürgen Oelschläger	Suzuki						13						3
31	(Germany) Michael Schulten	Yamaha									13			3
32	(Italy) Camillo Mariottini	Ducati						17	14					2
32	(Italy) Camillo Mariottini	Yamaha											Ret	2
33	(Belgium) Sébastien Le Grelle	Honda	24	17	15	15	22	16	Ret	23				2
34	(United Kingdom) Scott Smart	Suzuki					15							1
35	(United Kingdom) Rob Frost	Yamaha											15	1
36	(Italy) Stefano Cruciani	Yamaha	22	21	Ret	Ret	Ret	Ret	Ret	18	15	Ret	Ret	1
	(Japan) Osamu Deguchi	Suzuki			16									0
	(Australia) Shannon Johnson	Honda				22	24	Ret	16	19	17	21	19	0
	(Italy) Ivan Clementi	Yamaha	21	18	18	17	21	Ret	Ret	20	DNS	22	20	0
	(Germany) Rico Penzkofer	Ducati						18			18			0
	(Spain) Augustin Escobar	Yamaha	18	22	19	23	Ret		Ret	26		Ret	Ret	0
	(Italy) Alessandro Polita	Yamaha						19	22					0
	(United Kingdom) Matt Llewellyn	Yamaha					19			Ret				0
	(South Africa) Brad Anassis	Ducati		20										0
	(Japan) Toshiyuki Hamaguchi	Ducati			Ret	20								0
	(Netherlands) Kyro Verstraten	Honda									20	Ret	DNS	0
	(Italy) Davide Bulega	Yamaha			21	Ret	Ret	Ret	20	25			Ret	0
	(Italy) Roberto Antonello	Ducati							21					0
	(Italy) Franco Brugnara	Yamaha								22			21	0
	(Italy) Alessandro Pizzagalli	Yamaha			Ret	21								0
	(United Kingdom) Steve Plater	Honda								Ret	Ret	Ret	22	0
	(Australia) Jamie Stauffer	Yamaha		23										0
	(Netherlands) Wim Theunissen	Honda										24		0
	(Australia) Alex Gobert	Honda	25											0
	(Italy) Antonio Carlacci	Ducati	Ret	Ret	DNS	DNS				Ret	Ret	25	Ret	0
	(Spain) Alex Hervas	Yamaha	Ret											0
	(Spain) Eduard Ullastres	Yamaha	Ret											0
	(Japan) Takashi Toda	Ducati			Ret									0
	(Italy) Gianfranco Guareschi	Suzuki				Ret								0
	(France) David Muscat	Ducati						Ret						0
	(France) Arnaud Van den Bossche	Yamaha							Ret	DNS				0
	(Netherlands) Harry Van Beek	Yamaha										Ret		0
	(Spain) Oriol Fernandez	Yamaha											Ret	0
	(Italy) Ivan Mengozzi	Ducati	DNS											
	(Italy) Matteo Campana	Ducati	DNS											
	(Germany) Stefan Nebel	Suzuki						DNQ						
	(United Kingdom) Dennis Hobbs	Yamaha					WD							
Pos	Rider	Bike	VAL (Spain)	PHI (Australia)	SUG (Japan)	MNZ (Italy)	DON (United Kingdom)	LAU (Germany)	MIS (San Marino)	BRA (Europe)	OSC (Germany)	ASS (Netherlands)	IMO (Italy)	Pts

Colour	Result
Gold	Winner
Silver	Second place
Bronze	Third place
Green	Points classification
Blue	Non-points classification
Blue	Non-classified finish (NC)
Purple	Retired, not classified (Ret)
Red	Did not qualify (DNQ)
Red	Did not pre-qualify (DNPQ)
Black	Disqualified (DSQ)
White	Did not start (DNS)
White	Withdrew (WD)
White	Race cancelled (C)
Blank	Did not practice (DNP)
Blank	Did not arrive (DNA)
Blank	Excluded (EX)

P – Pole position
F – Fastest lap
