= 2006 Assen Superbike World Championship round =

(Netherlands) 2006 Assen Superbike World Championship round
Round details
- Round 9 of 12 rounds in the 2006 Superbike World Championship. and Round 9 of 12 rounds in the 2006 Supersport World Championship.
- Date: September 3, 2006
- Location: Assen
- Course: Permanent racing facility 4.555 km (2.830 mi)

Superbike World Championship
Pole position
(Australia) Troy Corser
1:38.965
Fastest lap race 1	Fastest lap race 2
(Spain) Rubén Xaus	(Australia) Troy Bayliss
1:57.291	1:40.767

Supersport World Championship
Pole position
(France) Sébastien Charpentier
1:41.906
Fastest lap
(Australia) Kevin Curtain
1:55.516

The 2006 Assen Superbike World Championship round was the ninth round of the 2006 Superbike World Championship. It took place on the weekend of September 1–3, 2006 at the TT Circuit Assen located in Assen, Netherlands.

== Results ==
=== Superbike race 1 classification ===
Pos	No	Rider	Bike	Laps	Time	Grid	Points
1	9	(United Kingdom) Chris Walker	Kawasaki ZX 10R	22	44:23.501	13	25
2	88	(Australia) Andrew Pitt	Yamaha YZF R1	22	+4.965	8	20
3	84	(Italy) Michel Fabrizio	Honda CBR1000RR	22	+24.130	14	16
4	10	(Spain) Fonsi Nieto	Kawasaki ZX 10R	22	+36.968	9	13
5	3	(Japan) Norifumi Abe	Yamaha YZF R1	22	+37.178	18	11
6	76	(Germany) Max Neukirchner	Suzuki GSX-R1000 K6	22	+37.324	23	10
7	57	(Italy) Lorenzo Lanzi	Ducati 999 F06	22	+40.930	10	9
8	44	(Italy) Roberto Rolfo	Ducati 999 F05	22	+41.857	26	8
9	31	(Australia) Karl Muggeridge	Honda CBR1000RR	22	+53.382	6	7
10	52	(United Kingdom) James Toseland	Honda CBR1000RR	22	+55.869	7	6
11	8	(Italy) Ivan Clementi	Ducati 999 RS	22	+1:39.835	21	5
12	99	(Australia) Steve Martin	Petronas FP1	22	+1:59.724	11	4
13	38	(Japan) Shinichi Nakatomi	Yamaha YZF R1	21	+1 Laps	16	3
14	96	(Netherlands) Harry van Beek	Suzuki GSX-R1000 K2	21	+1 Laps	28	2
15	13	(Italy) Vittorio Iannuzzo	Suzuki GSX-R1000 K6	17	+5 Laps	22	1
Ret	25	(Australia) Josh Brookes	Kawasaki ZX 10R	14	Retirement	20	
Ret	41	(Japan) Noriyuki Haga	Yamaha YZF R1	12	Retirement	2	
Ret	21	(Australia) Troy Bayliss	Ducati 999 F06	10	Retirement	4	
Ret	71	(Japan) Yukio Kagayama	Suzuki GSX-R1000 K6	8	Retirement	3	
Ret	16	(France) Sébastien Gimbert	Yamaha YZF R1	8	Retirement	15	
Ret	11	(Spain) Rubén Xaus	Ducati 999 F05	7	Retirement	12	
Ret	1	(Australia) Troy Corser	Suzuki GSX-R1000 K6	6	Retirement	1	
Ret	80	(United States) Kurtis Roberts	Ducati 999 RS	5	Retirement	27	
Ret	55	(France) Régis Laconi	Kawasaki ZX 10R	5	Retirement	17	
Ret	20	(Italy) Marco Borciani	Ducati 999 F05	4	Retirement	24	
Ret	7	(Italy) Pierfrancesco Chili	Honda CBR1000RR	4	Retirement	19	
Ret	4	(Brazil) Alex Barros	Honda CBR1000RR	3	Retirement	5	
Ret	18	(United Kingdom) Craig Jones	Petronas FP1	0	Retirement	25	

=== Superbike race 2 classification ===
Pos	No	Rider	Bike	Laps	Time	Grid	Points
1	21	(Australia) Troy Bayliss	Ducati 999 F06	22	37:29.307	4	25
2	88	(Australia) Andrew Pitt	Yamaha YZF R1	22	+9.342	8	20
3	10	(Spain) Fonsi Nieto	Kawasaki ZX 10R	22	+11.648	9	16
4	71	(Japan) Yukio Kagayama	Suzuki GSX-R1000 K6	22	+12.743	3	13
5	11	(Spain) Rubén Xaus	Ducati 999 F05	22	+12.811	12	11
6	57	(Italy) Lorenzo Lanzi	Ducati 999 F06	22	+19.845	10	10
7	4	(Brazil) Alex Barros	Honda CBR1000RR	22	+29.241	5	9
8	55	(France) Régis Laconi	Kawasaki ZX 10R	22	+34.085	17	8
9	52	(United Kingdom) James Toseland	Honda CBR1000RR	22	+42.113	7	7
10	84	(Italy) Michel Fabrizio	Honda CBR1000RR	22	+51.815	14	6
11	99	(Australia) Steve Martin	Petronas FP1	22	+53.608	11	5
12	44	(Italy) Roberto Rolfo	Ducati 999 F05	22	+56.132	26	4
13	31	(Australia) Karl Muggeridge	Honda CBR1000RR	22	+57.168	6	3
14	9	(United Kingdom) Chris Walker	Kawasaki ZX 10R	22	+1:01.056	13	2
15	25	(Australia) Josh Brookes	Kawasaki ZX 10R	22	+1:34.429	20	1
16	8	(Italy) Ivan Clementi	Ducati 999 RS	21	+1 Lap	21	
Ret	13	(Italy) Vittorio Iannuzzo	Suzuki GSX-R1000 K6	17	Retirement	22	
Ret	38	(Japan) Shinichi Nakatomi	Yamaha YZF R1	16	Retirement	16	
Ret	3	(Japan) Norifumi Abe	Yamaha YZF R1	14	Retirement	18	
Ret	96	(Netherlands) Harry van Beek	Suzuki GSX-R1000 K2	14	Retirement	28	
Ret	7	(Italy) Pierfrancesco Chili	Honda CBR1000RR	8	Retirement	19	
Ret	20	(Italy) Marco Borciani	Ducati 999 F05	5	Retirement	24	
Ret	18	(United Kingdom) Craig Jones	Petronas FP1	4	Retirement	25	
Ret	76	(Germany) Max Neukirchner	Suzuki GSX-R1000 K6	2	Retirement	23	
Ret	80	(United States) Kurtis Roberts	Ducati 999 RS	0	Retirement	27	
Ret	41	(Japan) Noriyuki Haga	Yamaha YZF R1	0	Retirement	2	
Ret	1	(Australia) Troy Corser	Suzuki GSX-R1000 K6	0	Retirement	1	
DNS	16	(France) Sébastien Gimbert	Yamaha YZF R1		Injured in race 1	15	

=== Supersport race classification ===
Pos	No	Rider	Bike	Laps	Time	Grid	Points
1	54	(Turkey) Kenan Sofuoğlu	Honda CBR600RR	21	41:49.124	9	25
2	11	(Australia) Kevin Curtain	Yamaha YZF-R6	21	+4.581	2	20
3	22	(Norway) Kai Børre Andersen	Suzuki GSX-R600	21	+9.241	6	16
4	16	(France) Sébastien Charpentier	Honda CBR600RR	21	+9.489	1	13
5	28	(Netherlands) Arie Vos	Honda CBR600RR	21	+29.994	13	11
6	77	(Netherlands) Barry Veneman	Suzuki GSX-R600	21	+31.858	7	10
7	45	(Italy) Gianluca Vizziello	Yamaha YZF-R6	21	+54.312	10	9
8	55	(Italy) Massimo Roccoli	Yamaha YZF-R6	21	+56.085	11	8
9	127	(Denmark) Robbin Harms	Honda CBR600RR	21	+1:09.735	5	7
10	72	(United Kingdom) Stuart Easton	Ducati 749R	21	+1:13.899	21	6
11	8	(France) Maxime Berger	Kawasaki ZX-6R	21	+1:21.451	20	5
12	145	(Belgium) Sébastien Le Grelle	Honda CBR600RR	21	+1:26.458	35	4
13	5	(Italy) Alessio Velini	Yamaha YZF-R6	21	+1:32.137	32	3
14	31	(Finland) Vesa Kallio	Yamaha YZF-R6	21	+1:37.377	23	4
15	69	(Italy) Gianluca Nannelli	Ducati 749R	21	+1:45.357	17	1
16	27	(United Kingdom) Tom Tunstall	Honda CBR600RR	21	+1:45.957	30	
17	3	(Japan) Katsuaki Fujiwara	Honda CBR600RR	21	+1:48.767	15	
18	17	(Portugal) Miguel Praia	Honda CBR600RR	21	+2:03.264	33	
19	60	(Russia) Vladimir Ivanov	Yamaha YZF-R6	21	+2:20.260	27	
20	25	(Finland) Tatu Lauslehto	Honda CBR600RR	21	+3:00.887	24	
21	121	(Italy) Alessio Aldrovandi	Honda CBR600RR	21	+3:03.119	37	
Ret	63	(Italy) Lorenzo Alfonsi	Yamaha YZF-R6	16	Retirement	31	
Ret	88	(France) Julien Enjolras	Yamaha YZF-R6	15	Accident	29	
Ret	38	(France) Grégory Leblanc	Honda CBR600RR	13	Accident	16	
Ret	94	(Spain) David Checa	Yamaha YZF-R6	13	Retirement	14	
Ret	37	(San Marino) William De Angelis	Honda CBR600RR	13	Retirement	25	
Ret	116	(Sweden) Johan Stigefelt	Honda CBR600RR	12	Retirement	12	
Ret	21	(Canada) Chris Peris	Yamaha YZF-R6	11	Retirement	19	
Ret	32	(France) Yoann Tiberio	Honda CBR600RR	10	Accident	4	
Ret	93	(France) Stéphane Duterne	Yamaha YZF-R6	9	Accident	34	
Ret	57	(Slovenia) Luka Nedog	Ducati 749R	9	Accident	36	
Ret	18	(France) Matthieu Lagrive	Honda CBR600RR	8	Retirement	18	
Ret	6	(Italy) Mauro Sanchini	Yamaha YZF-R6	7	Retirement	22	
Ret	30	(Netherlands) Joan Veijer	Honda CBR600RR	6	Accident	28	
Ret	73	(Austria) Christian Zaiser	Ducati 749R	6	Accident	8	
Ret	7	(France) Stéphane Chambon	Kawasaki ZX-6R	3	Retirement	26	
Ret	23	(Australia) Broc Parkes	Yamaha YZF-R6	2	Accident	3	
Ret	15	(Italy) Andrea Berta	Yamaha YZF-R6	1	Retirement	38	

== Superstock 1000 race classification ==
Pos.	No.	Rider	Bike	Laps	Time/Retired	Grid	Points
1	77	(Italy) Claudio Corti	Yamaha YZF-R1	13	22:58.130	2	25
2	26	(Australia) Brendan Roberts	Suzuki GSX-R1000 K6	13	+3.461	3	20
3	53	(Italy) Alessandro Polita	Suzuki GSX-R1000 K6	13	+5.718	7	16
4	15	(Italy) Matteo Baiocco	Yamaha YZF-R1	13	+6.094	9	13
5	9	(Italy) Luca Scassa	MV Agusta F4 1000 R	13	+7.397	6	11
6	16	(Spain) Enrique Rocamora	Yamaha YZF-R1	13	+7.623	14	10
7	38	(Italy) Gilles Boccolini	Kawasaki ZX-10R	13	+8.007	10	9
8	8	(France) Loïc Napoleone	Suzuki GSX-R1000 K6	13	+8.557	15	8
9	57	(Italy) Ilario Dionisi	MV Agusta F4 1000 R	13	+8.596	4	7
10	50	(Australia) David Johnson	Yamaha YZF-R1	13	+10.275	8	6
11	32	(South Africa) Sheridan Morais	Suzuki GSX-R1000 K6	13	+16.091	11	5
12	5	(Italy) Riccardo Chiarello	Kawasaki ZX-10R	13	+16.188	16	4
13	47	(United Kingdom) Richard Cooper	Honda CBR1000RR	13	+16.396	18	3
14	99	(Italy) Danilo Dell'Omo	Suzuki GSX-R1000 K6	13	+17.802	13	2
15	40	(Switzerland) Hervé Gantner	Honda CBR1000RR	13	+24.357	20	1
16	24	(Slovenia) Marko Jerman	Suzuki GSX-R1000 K6	13	+32.870	25	
17	73	(Italy) Simone Saltarelli	Yamaha YZF-R1	13	+34.723	24	
18	35	(Netherlands) Allard Kerkhoven	Suzuki GSX-R1000 K6	13	+40.997	31	
19	64	(Belgium) Didier Heyndrickx	Suzuki GSX-R1000 K6	13	+41.287	28	
20	90	(Italy) Diego Ciavattini	Yamaha YZF-R1	13	+42.886	26	
21	44	(Italy) Roberto Lunadei	Yamaha YZF-R1	13	+45.427	17	
22	34	(Republic of Ireland) Mark Pollock	Suzuki GSX-R1000 K6	13	+1:25.718	33	
23	18	(Belgium) Eric Van Bael	Suzuki GSX-R1000 K6	13	+1:32.373	35	
Ret	11	(Italy) Denis Sacchetti	Kawasaki ZX-10R	12	Accident	5	
Ret	12	(Germany) Leonardo Biliotti	Suzuki GSX-R1000 K6	12	Accident	21	
Ret	17	(France) Cédric Tangre	Suzuki GSX-R1000 K6	12	Accident	23	
Ret	49	(Netherlands) Jarno Van Der Marel	Suzuki GSX-R750 K6	12	Accident	19	
Ret	31	(Italy) Giuseppe Barone	Suzuki GSX-R1000 K6	12	Accident	27	
Ret	14	(Italy) Mauro Belliero	Honda CBR1000RR	11	Retirement	32	
Ret	21	(Netherlands) Leon Bovee	Suzuki GSX-R1000 K6	11	Retirement	30	
Ret	96	(Czech Republic) Matěj Smrž	Honda CBR1000RR	10	Retirement	12	
Ret	55	(Belgium) Olivier Depoorter	Suzuki GSX-R1000 K6	9	Retirement	22	
Ret	71	(Norway) Petter Solli	Yamaha YZF-R1	3	Retirement	34	
Ret	20	(Italy) Fabrizio Perotti	Kawasaki ZX-10R	1	Accident	29	
Ret	86	(Italy) Ayrton Badovini	MV Agusta F4 1000 R	0	Accident	1	
DNQ	33	(United Kingdom) Patrick McDougall	Suzuki GSX-R1000 K6		Did not qualify		
DNQ	58	(Italy) Robert Gianfardoni	Yamaha YZF-R1		Did not qualify		
WD	89	(Switzerland) Raphael Chevre	Suzuki GSX-R1000 K6		Withdrew		

== Superstock 600 race classification ==
Pos.	No.	Rider	Bike	Laps	Time/Retired	Grid	Points
1	59	(Italy) Niccolò Canepa	Ducati 749R	10	19:59.402	1	25
2	19	(Belgium) Xavier Simeon	Suzuki GSX-R600	11	+0.139	2	20
3	10	(Italy) Davide Giugliano	Kawasaki ZX-6R	11	+1.796	3	16
4	8	(Italy) Andrea Antonelli	Honda CBR600RR	11	+3.740	5	13
5	41	(Switzerland) Gregory Junod	Suzuki GSX-R600	11	+22.768	9	11
6	43	(Netherlands) Nigel Walraven	Suzuki GSX-R600	11	+24.943	10	10
7	89	(Italy) Domenico Colucci	Ducati 749R	11	+25.203	12	9
8	37	(Poland) Andrzej Chmielewski	Yamaha YZF-R6	11	+32.439	18	8
9	30	(Switzerland) Michaël Savary	Yamaha YZF-R6	11	+32.677	21	7
10	199	(United Kingdom) Gregg Black	Honda CBR600RR	11	+32.748	14	6
11	31	(Netherlands) Lennart Van Houwelingen	Suzuki GSX-R600	11	+34.208	15	5
12	69	(Czech Republic) Ondřej Ježek	Kawasaki ZX-6R	11	+37.403	16	4
13	56	(Switzerland) Daniel Sutter	Honda CBR600RR	11	+37.781	11	3
14	77	(United Kingdom) Barry Burrell	Honda CBR600RR	11	+37.867	19	2
15	44	(Italy) Cristiano Erbacci	Yamaha YZF-R6	11	+41.279	27	1
16	96	(Netherlands) Marcel Van Nieuwenhuizen	Yamaha YZF-R6	11	+42.459	22	
17	55	(Belgium) Vincent Lonbois	Suzuki GSX-R600	11	+48.416	31	
18	99	(Netherlands) Roy Ten Napel	Yamaha YZF-R6	11	+48.755	4	
19	21	(France) Franck Millet	Yamaha YZF-R6	11	+48.783	23	
20	84	(Slovenia) Boštjan Pintar	Yamaha YZF-R6	11	+56.657	26	
21	35	(Netherlands) Ronald Ter Braake	Kawasaki ZX-6R	11	+56.900	8	
22	46	(United Kingdom) Leon Hunt	Yamaha YZF-R6	11	+57.157	29	
23	63	(Italy) Patrizio Valsecchi	Yamaha YZF-R6	11	+1:04.489	32	
24	18	(United Kingdom) Matt Bond	Suzuki GSX-R600	11	+1:21.191	25	
25	28	(Spain) Yannick Guerra	Yamaha YZF-R6	11	+1:26.242	35	
26	25	(Czech Republic) Patrik Vostárek	Honda CBR600RR	10	+1 lap	34	
27	33	(Italy) Alessandro Colatosti	Kawasaki ZX-6R	10	+1 lap	17	
28	42	(Netherlands) Sam Van Rens	Kawasaki ZX-6R	10	+1 lap	20	
Ret	24	(Italy) Daniele Beretta	Suzuki GSX-R600	3	Accident	7	
Ret	88	(Norway) Mads Odin Hodt	Yamaha YZF-R6	3	Retirement	24	
Ret	16	(United Kingdom) Christopher Northover	Suzuki GSX-R600	2	Accident	30	
Ret	7	(Italy) Renato Costantini	Honda CBR600RR	0	Accident	13	
Ret	34	(Sweden) Alexander Lundh	Honda CBR600RR	0	Accident	6	
DNS	74	(France) Sylvain Barrier	Yamaha YZF-R6	0	Did not start	28	
DNS	26	(United States) Will Gruy	Yamaha YZF-R6	0	Did not start	33	
DNQ	12	(Italy) Davide Caldart	Kawasaki ZX-6R		Did not qualify		
