= 2000 Supersport World Championship =

2000 Supersport World Championship
Previous:	1999	Next:	2001
Support series: Superbike World Championship; Superstock European Championship

The 2000 Supersport World Championship was the fourth season of the Supersport World Championship. The season was held over 11 races following the Superbike World Championship calendar except two races at Kyalami and Laguna Seca. Beginning on 23 April at Phillip Island Grand Prix Circuit in Australia, and finished on 15 October at Brands Hatch in Great Britain.

Jörg Teuchert won the title after beating closest rival Paolo Casoli.

== Race calendar and results ==
Round	Date	Round	Circuit	Pole position	Fastest lap	Race winner	Winning team	Winning constructor
1	23 April	Australia	Phillip Island Circuit	(Spain) Ruben Xaus	(United Kingdom) James Whitham	(United Kingdom) James Whitham	Yamaha Belgarda	Yamaha
2	30 April	Japan	Sportsland Sugo	(Germany) Christian Kellner	(Germany) Jörg Teuchert	(Germany) Jörg Teuchert	Alpha Technik Yamaha	Yamaha
3	14 May	(United Kingdom) Great Britain	Donington Park	(Australia) Karl Muggeridge	(Germany) Jörg Teuchert	(France) Stéphane Chambon	Suzuki Alstare	Suzuki
4	21 May	Italy	Autodromo Nazionale Monza	(Spain) Ruben Xaus	(France) Christophe Cogan	(Italy) Paolo Casoli	Ducati Infostrada	Ducati
5	4 June	Germany	Hockenheimring	(Italy) Paolo Casoli	(Germany) Christian Kellner	(Germany) Jörg Teuchert	Alpha Technik Yamaha	Yamaha
6	18 June	San Marino	Autodromo di Santa Monica	(Italy) Paolo Casoli	(Germany) Jörg Teuchert	(Germany) Christian Kellner	Alpha Technik Yamaha	Yamaha
7	25 June	Spain	Circuit Ricardo Tormo	(Germany) Jörg Teuchert	(United Kingdom) Iain MacPherson	(Germany) Christian Kellner	Alpha Technik Yamaha	Yamaha
8	6 August	(European Union) Europe	Brands Hatch	(Australia) Karl Muggeridge	(United Kingdom) Iain MacPherson	(Italy) Paolo Casoli	Ducati Infostrada	Ducati
9	3 September	Netherlands	TT Circuit Assen	(France) Stéphane Chambon	(United Kingdom) James Whitham	(Spain) Ruben Xaus	Ducati Infostrada	Ducati
10	10 September	Germany	Motorsport Arena Oschersleben	(Australia) Karl Muggeridge	(Germany) Jörg Teuchert	(France) Stéphane Chambon	Suzuki Alstare	Suzuki
11	15 October	(United Kingdom) Great Britain	Brands Hatch	(Italy) Piergiorgio Bontempi	(Germany) Jörg Teuchert	(Australia) Karl Muggeridge	Ten Kate Honda	Honda

== Entry list ==
Team	Constructor	Motorcycle	No.	Rider	Rounds
D.C.R. Pirelli	Ducati	Ducati 748R	3	(Italy) Piergiorgio Bontempi	All
D.C.R. Pirelli	Ducati	Ducati 748R	54	(Italy) Stefano Cruciani	7
D.C.R. Pirelli	Ducati	Ducati 748R	99	(France) Fabien Foret	1–6, 8–11
D.F.X. Racing	Ducati	Ducati 748R	19	(Italy) Walter Tortoroglio	1–10
D.F.X. Racing	Ducati	Ducati 748R	34	(Switzerland) Yves Briguet	All
D.F.X. Racing	Ducati	Ducati 748R	89	(France) David Muscat	11
Ducati Infostrada	Ducati	Ducati 748R	5	(Spain) Ruben Xaus	All
Ducati Infostrada	Ducati	Ducati 748R	15	(Italy) Paolo Casoli	All
D&E Ducati R. UK	Ducati	Ducati 748R	64	(Australia) Dean Thomas	8
Foundation	Ducati	Ducati 748R	52	(Japan) Ichiro Asai	2
TDC Desenzano Corse	Ducati	Ducati 748R	25	(Slovenia) Igor Jerman	1–4, 6
TDC Desenzano Corse	Ducati	Ducati 748R	28	(Italy) Michele Malatesta	1–4
Team Rox	Ducati	Ducati 748R	54	(Italy) Stefano Cruciani	6
By Queroseno RT	Honda	Honda CBR600F	57	(Spain) Eduard Ullastres	7
Castrol Honda	Honda	Honda CBR600F	17	(Spain) Pere Riba	All
Castrol Honda	Honda	Honda CBR600F	27	(Australia) Chris Vermeulen	9–11
Castrol Honda	Honda	Honda CBR600F	35	(Japan) Shinya Takeishi	1–8
Honda France Elf	Honda	Honda CBR600F	10	(France) William Costes	All
Honda France Elf	Honda	Honda CBR600F	16	(France) Sébastien Charpentier	All
Mobil Honda Racing	Honda	Honda CBR600F	51	(Australia) Adam Fergusson	1
Ten Kate Honda	Honda	Honda CBR600F	31	(Australia) Karl Muggeridge	All
Ten Kate Honda	Honda	Honda CBR600F	33	(South Africa) Greg Dreyer	1–2
Ten Kate Honda	Honda	Honda CBR600F	39	(Australia) Nigel Arnold	3–7
Ten Kate Honda	Honda	Honda CBR600F	79	(United Kingdom) Phil Giles	11
Ten Kate Honda	Honda	Honda CBR600F	83	(United Kingdom) James Ellison	8–10
Kawasaki Racing	Kawasaki	Kawasaki ZX-6R	2	(United Kingdom) Iain MacPherson	All
Kawasaki Racing	Kawasaki	Kawasaki ZX-6R	12	(Australia) Andrew Pitt	All
Manson Motorsport	Kawasaki	Kawasaki ZX-6R	73	(United Kingdom) Gary Mason	11
Turnbull Kawasaki Racing	Kawasaki	Kawasaki ZX-6R	50	(Australia) Chad Turnbull	1
ZM	Kawasaki	Kawasaki ZX-6R	45	(Italy) Camillo Mariottini	4
Implas Motorsport	Suzuki	Suzuki GSX-R600	42	(United Kingdom) Jamie Morley	3
Metalsistem Endoug	Suzuki	Suzuki GSX-R600	8	(Italy) Cristiano Migliorati	All
Metalsistem Endoug	Suzuki	Suzuki GSX-R600	20	(United Kingdom) Karl Harris	All
Monza Corse	Suzuki	Suzuki GSX-R600	28	(Italy) Michele Malatesta	6–11
Monza Corse	Suzuki	Suzuki GSX-R600	70	(United Kingdom) Phil Giles	3–4
Monza Corse	Suzuki	Suzuki GSX-R600	71	(Australia) Paul Free	5
Monza Corse	Suzuki	Suzuki GSX-R600	77	(Italy) Andrea Giachino	1–2
Schaefer Mo Devil	Suzuki	Suzuki GSX-R600	49	(Germany) Herbert Kaufmann	5
Steinhausen Bender	Suzuki	Suzuki GSX-R600	48	(Germany) Stefan Scheschowitsch	5
Suzuki Alstare	Suzuki	Suzuki GSX-R600	1	(France) Stéphane Chambon	1–6, 8–11
Suzuki Alstare	Suzuki	Suzuki GSX-R600	7	(Italy) Fabrizio Pirovano	1–2, 4–11
TDC Desenzano Corse	Suzuki	Suzuki GSX-R600	82	(South Africa) Gareth Kenward	7–11
Alpha Technik Yamaha	Yamaha	Yamaha YZF-R6	4	(Germany) Jörg Teuchert	All
Alpha Technik Yamaha	Yamaha	Yamaha YZF-R6	6	(Germany) Christian Kellner	All
B&H Racing	Yamaha	Yamaha YZF-R6	43	(United Kingdom) Stuart Wickens	3
B&H Racing	Yamaha	Yamaha YZF-R6	72	(United Kingdom) Rob Frost	11
Belart Motorsport	Yamaha	Yamaha YZF-R6	56	(Spain) David Vazquez	7
BKM Racing	Yamaha	Yamaha YZF-R6	11	(France) Julien Allemand	1
BKM Racing	Yamaha	Yamaha YZF-R6	14	(France) Christophe Cogan	All
BKM Racing	Yamaha	Yamaha YZF-R6	37	(United Kingdom) Paul Young	5, 9–10
BKM Racing	Yamaha	Yamaha YZF-R6	40	(United Kingdom) Kevin Curtain	2–4, 6–8
BKM Racing	Yamaha	Yamaha YZF-R6	74	(France) Sébastien Scarnato	11
Dee Cee Jeans Racing	Yamaha	Yamaha YZF-R6	9	(Netherlands) Wilco Zeelenberg	All
Dee Cee Jeans Racing	Yamaha	Yamaha YZF-R6	29	(Sweden) Christer Lindholm	1–4, 8–11
Dee Cee Jeans Racing	Yamaha	Yamaha YZF-R6	38	(France) Eric Mahe	5–6
Deroue Pevanha Pol H	Yamaha	Yamaha YZF-R6	62	(Netherlands) Rudi Markink	9
Ejiyu Pro Racing	Yamaha	Yamaha YZF-R6	53	(Japan) Noriyasu Numata	2
Folch Endurance	Yamaha	Yamaha YZF-R6	58	(Spain) Alex Hervas	7
Fujifilm Karthin R.	Yamaha	Yamaha YZF-R6	66	(Germany) Stefan Nebel	10
Lorenzini by Leoni; Lorenzini–T.Italia	Yamaha	Yamaha YZF-R6	18	(Italy) Vittorio Iannuzzo	All
Lorenzini by Leoni; Lorenzini–T.Italia	Yamaha	Yamaha YZF-R6	54	(Italy) Stefano Cruciani	11
Lorenzini by Leoni; Lorenzini–T.Italia	Yamaha	Yamaha YZF-R6	55	(Italy) Norino Brignola	1–7
Lorenzini by Leoni; Lorenzini–T.Italia	Yamaha	Yamaha YZF-R6	61	(Italy) Fabio Capriotti	8–10
Gi Motorsport	Yamaha	Yamaha YZF-R6	23	(Italy) Davide Bulega	1–6
Gi Motorsport	Yamaha	Yamaha YZF-R6	24	(Italy) Maurizio Prattichizzo	1–7
Gi Motorsport	Yamaha	Yamaha YZF-R6	44	(Italy) Antonio Carlacci	7–11
Gi Motorsport	Yamaha	Yamaha YZF-R6	55	(Italy) Norino Brignola	8
Gi Motorsport	Yamaha	Yamaha YZF-R6	67	(Italy) Franco Brugnara	9–11
Start Team	Yamaha	Yamaha YZF-R6	44	(Italy) Antonio Carlacci	4, 6
V&M Racing	Yamaha	Yamaha YZF-R6	59	(United Kingdom) Jim Moodie	8
Yacco Mo Laaks	Yamaha	Yamaha YZF-R6	65	(Germany) Michael Schulten	10
Yamaha Belgarda	Yamaha	Yamaha YZF-R6	21	(Italy) Massimo Meregalli	All
Yamaha Belgarda	Yamaha	Yamaha YZF-R6	69	(United Kingdom) James Whitham	All
Yamaha Belgium	Yamaha	Yamaha YZF-R6	22	(Belgium) Werner Daemen	All
Yamaha Belgium	Yamaha	Yamaha YZF-R6	26	(Netherlands) Kyro Verstraeten	1–3, 6–11
Yamaha Belgium	Yamaha	Yamaha YZF-R6	46	(France) Nicolas Dussauge	4–5
Yamaha Motors Ned.	Yamaha	Yamaha YZF-R6	63	(Netherlands) Harry Van Beek	9

Key
Regular rider
Wildcard rider
Replacement rider

== Championship' standings ==
=== Riders' standings ===
Pos	Rider	Bike	PHI (Australia)	SUG (Japan)	DON (United Kingdom)	MNZ (Italy)	HOC (Germany)	MIS (San Marino)	VAL (Spain)	BRA (Europe)	ASS (Netherlands)	OSC (Germany)	BRA2 (United Kingdom)	Pts
1	(Germany) Jörg Teuchert	Yamaha	11	1^{F}	3^{F}	7	1	3^{F}	2^{P}	DNS	DSQ	Ret^{F}	2^{F}	136
2	(Italy) Paolo Casoli	Ducati	2	Ret	8	1	5^{P}	2^{P}	Ret	1	4	Ret	5	133
3	(France) Stéphane Chambon	Suzuki	3	3	1	9	3	Ret		8	2^{P}	1	Ret	133
4	(Germany) Christian Kellner	Yamaha	Ret	2^{P}	7	5	7^{F}	1	1	6	Ret	Ret	4	122
5	(Australia) Karl Muggeridge	Honda	Ret	6	Ret^{P}	3	10	4	Ret	2^{P}	13	2^{P}	1	113
6	(United Kingdom) James Whitham	Yamaha	1^{F}	4	2	2	6	Ret	Ret	Ret	Ret^{F}	Ret	3	104
7	(Spain) Ruben Xaus	Ducati	23^{P}	18	Ret	6^{P}	2	Ret	18	7	1	4	Ret	77
8	(United Kingdom) Iain MacPherson	Kawasaki	15	5	6	8	4	Ret	6^{F}	3^{F}	Ret	Ret	11	74
9	(Italy) Fabrizio Pirovano	Suzuki	9	7		Ret	8	5	4	11	Ret	Ret	8	61
10	(Australia) Andrew Pitt	Kawasaki	Ret	8	4	13	17	7	8	13	10	Ret	6	60
11	(Italy) Massimo Meregalli	Yamaha	8	10	11	4	11	8	Ret	14	DSQ	5	Ret	58
12	(Italy) Piergiorgio Bontempi	Ducati	Ret	9	14	11	16	9	7	Ret	5	6	Ret^{P}	51
13	(Spain) Pere Riba	Honda	5	Ret	10	17	DNS	DSQ	3	5	Ret	Ret	Ret	44
14	(France) Christophe Cogan	Yamaha	6	14	9	10^{F}	Ret	Ret	9	10	Ret	Ret	12	42
15	(Belgium) Werner Daemen	Yamaha	21	16	13	18	9	14	10	12	Ret	9	7	38
16	(Sweden) Christer Lindholm	Yamaha	13	12	5	Ret				17	3	Ret	19	34
17	(Italy) Antonio Carlacci	Yamaha				Ret		6	5	9	Ret	Ret	Ret	28
18	(Italy) Cristiano Migliorati	Suzuki	10	Ret	Ret	20	12	12	11	18	17	7	20	28
19	(France) Fabien Foret	Ducati	DNS	DNS	Ret	12	Ret	WD		Ret	Ret	3	13	23
20	(Netherlands) Wilco Zeelenberg	Yamaha	7	15	Ret	14	13	16	15	25	9	16	Ret	23
21	(Australia) Chris Vermeulen	Honda									6	Ret	10	16
22	(United Kingdom) Karl Harris	Suzuki	Ret	Ret	Ret	23	Ret	18	13	Ret	DNS	12	9	14
23	(Australia) Adam Fergusson	Honda	4											13
24	(United Kingdom) Jim Moodie	Yamaha								4				13
25	(France) William Costes	Honda	Ret	17	Ret	19	Ret	13	12	Ret	12	14	21	13
26	(Japan) Shinya Takeishi	Honda	Ret	11	17	16	Ret	11	Ret	DNS				10
27	(Italy) Franco Brugnara	Yamaha									7	18	22	9
28	(Netherlands) Harry Van Beek	Yamaha									8			8
29	(Germany) Stefan Nebel	Yamaha										8		8
30	(Italy) Michele Malatesta	Ducati	19	Ret	Ret	Ret		17						8
30	(Italy) Michele Malatesta	Suzuki							14	22	Ret	10	23	8
31	(Italy) Vittorio Iannuzzo	Yamaha	Ret	Ret	12	Ret	14	Ret	Ret	19	Ret	15	Ret	7
32	(Italy) Stefano Cruciani	Ducati						10	Ret					6
32	(Italy) Stefano Cruciani	Yamaha											16	6
33	(United Kingdom) James Ellison	Honda								23	15	11		6
34	(Italy) Norino Brignola	Yamaha	12	19	15	24	24	15	Ret	20				6
35	(Switzerland) Yves Briguet	Ducati	18	Ret	Ret	Ret	20	19	Ret	Ret	11	17	Ret	5
36	(Japan) Ichiro Asai	Ducati		13										3
37	(Netherlands) Kyro Verstreaten	Yamaha	22	Ret	Ret			20	Ret	24	Ret	13	Ret	3
38	(Australia) Chad Turnbull	Kawasaki	14											2
39	(United Kingdom) Gary Mason	Kawasaki											14	2
40	(Italy) Fabio Capriotti	Yamaha								Ret	14	19		2
41	(Australia) Dean Thomas	Ducati								15				1
42	(France) David Muscat	Ducati											15	1
43	(Slovenia) Igor Jerman	Ducati	Ret	21	20	15		Ret						1
44	(Italy) Walter Tortoroglio	Ducati	20	Ret	Ret	Ret	15	Ret	Ret	21	Ret	Ret		1
	(Italy) Davide Bulega	Yamaha	16	Ret	18	22	19	Ret						0
	(Australia) Kevin Curtain	Yamaha		DSQ	Ret	DNS		Ret	Ret	16				0
	(Spain) Alex Hervas	Yamaha							Ret					0
	(South Africa) Greg Dreyer	Honda	17	Ret										0
	(United Kingdom) Phil Giles	Suzuki			Ret	25								0
	(United Kingdom) Phil Giles	Honda											17	0
	(France) Sébastien Scarnato	Yamaha											18	0
	(South Africa) Gareth Kenward	Suzuki							Ret	26	18	20	DNS	0
	(France) Nicolas Dussauge	Yamaha				21	18							0
	(United Kingdom) Stuart Wickens	Yamhaa			19									0
	(Italy) Maurizio Prattichizzo	Yamaha	Ret	20	21	Ret	Ret	Ret	Ret					0
	(Australia) Nigel Arnold	Honda			Ret	Ret	21	Ret	DNS					0
	(United Kingdom) Paul Young	Yamaha					22				Ret	Ret		0
	(France) Eric Mahe	Yamaha					23	Ret						0
	(Italy) Andrea Giachino	Suzuki	24	Ret										0
	(France) Julien Allemand	Yamaha	Ret											0
	(Japan) Noriyasu Numata	Yamaha		Ret										0
	(Italy) Camillo Mariottini	Kawasaki				Ret								0
	(Germany) Herbert Kaufmann	Suzuki					Ret							0
	(Germany) Stefan Scheschowitsch	Suzuki					Ret							0
	(Spain) David Vazquez	Yamaha							Ret					0
	(Spain) Eduard Ullastres	Honda							Ret					0
	(Netherlands) Rudi Markink	Yamaha									Ret			0
	(Germany) Michael Schulten	Yamaha										Ret		0
	(United Kingdom) Rob Frost	Yamaha											DSQ	0
	(United Kingdom) Jamie Morley	Suzuki			DNS									
	(Australia) Paul Free	Suzuki					DNS							
Pos	Rider	Bike	PHI (Australia)	SUG (Japan)	DON (United Kingdom)	MNZ (Italy)	HOC (Germany)	MIS (San Marino)	VAL (Spain)	BRA (Europe)	ASS (Netherlands)	OSC (Germany)	BRA2 (United Kingdom)	Pts

Colour	Result
Gold	Winner
Silver	Second place
Bronze	Third place
Green	Points classification
Blue	Non-points classification
Blue	Non-classified finish (NC)
Purple	Retired, not classified (Ret)
Red	Did not qualify (DNQ)
Red	Did not pre-qualify (DNPQ)
Black	Disqualified (DSQ)
White	Did not start (DNS)
White	Withdrew (WD)
White	Race cancelled (C)
Blank	Did not practice (DNP)
Blank	Did not arrive (DNA)
Blank	Excluded (EX)

P – Pole position
F – Fastest lap
