= Frédéric Bolley =

French motorcycle racer

- Nationality: French
- Born: 17 February 1974 (age 52) Marseille, France

Motocross career
- Years active: 1997, 1999-2002
- Teams: Honda
- Championships: 250cc - 1999, 2000
- Wins: 13

Frédéric Roger Marcel Bolley (born 17 February 1974 in Marseille) is a French former professional motocross racer. He competed in the Motocross World Championships from 1997 to 2002. Bolley is notable for being a two-time 250cc motocross world champion.

Bolley won consecutive F.I.M. 250cc motocross world championships in 1999 and 2000 riding for the Honda factory racing team.

In 2002, Bolley announced his retirement from motocross to follow Jean-Michel Bayle by switching to road racing. He later competed in the supermoto world championships as well as indoor enduro competitions.
