= Andrew Pitt =

Australian motorcycle racer (born 1976)

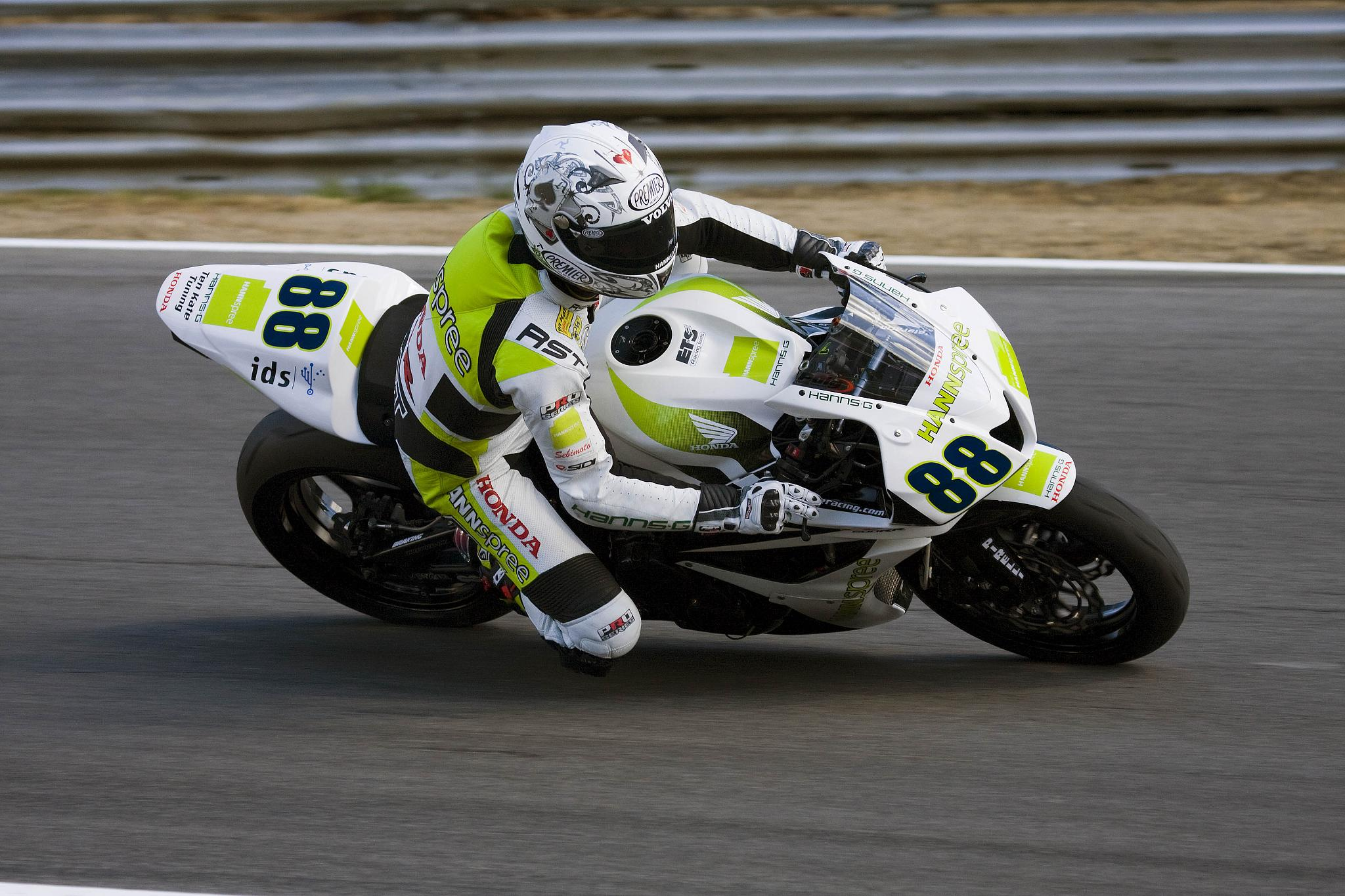
- Andrew Pitt, August 2008
- Nationality: Australian
- Born: 19 February 1976 (age 50); Kempsey, New South Wales, Australia
Motorcycle racing career statistics
MotoGP World Championship
Active years	2002–2004, 2007
Manufacturers	Kawasaki, Moriwaki, Ilmor
Championships	0
2007 championship position	NC (0 pts)
Starts / Wins / Podiums / Poles / F. laps / Points; 23 / 0 / 0 / 0 / 0 / 10
Superbike World Championship
Active years	2005–2006, 2010
Manufacturers	Yamaha, BMW
Championships	0
2010 championship position	27th (3 pts)
Starts / Wins / Podiums / Poles / F. laps / Points; 53 / 1 / 6 / 0 / 1 / 409
Supersport World Championship
Active years	2000–2002, 2004, 2007–2009
Manufacturers	Kawasaki, Yamaha, Honda
Championships	2 (2001, 2008)
2009 championship position	6th (119 pts)
Starts / Wins / Podiums / Poles / F. laps / Points; 66 / 7 / 23 / 3 / 6 / 744
British Superbike Championship
Active years	2010
Manufacturers	Yamaha
Championships	0
2010 championship position	21st (37 pts)
Starts / Wins / Podiums / Poles / F. laps / Points; 8 / 0 / 0 / 0 / 0 / 37

Andrew James Pitt (born 19 February 1976 in Kempsey, New South Wales, Australia) is a retired motorcycle racer. He is a double World Supersport Champion, and has also won a World Superbike race and competed in MotoGP. He lives in Peel on the Isle of Man.

== Career ==
=== Early career ===
Pitt began racing in the NSW State 250 Production Series in 1995, winning it in 1997. He was Australian Supersport Champion and Superbike runner-up in 1999, before entering the Supersport World Championship in 2000 riding for Kawasaki. He finished tenth in his debut season and won the title in 2001, without winning a race. For 2002, he continued in Supersport with Kawasaki finishing the season fifth and gaining his first two victories.

=== MotoGP & Superbike World Championship ===
At the end of 2002, Pitt was given a ride on Kawasaki's first MotoGP bike for the final three races of the season. He took his and Kawasaki's first MotoGP points at the final race of the season. His promising results in 2002 made Kawasaki offer him a full-time MotoGP ride for the 2003 season. He matched experienced teammate Garry McCoy, but neither was retained after an uncompetitive year. He made occasional appearances for Moriwaki in 2004 as part of their development programme.

In 2004, Yamaha signed Pitt. After three Supersport World Championship races at the end of the year, he was a Superbike World Championship factory rider for 2005. He finished the season eighth overall, behind teammate Noriyuki Haga who was third. Things improved in 2006 as he was fifth overall, and scored his maiden Superbike World Championship win at the Misano Circuit in Italy in June 2006. At the end of the 2006 season, he lost his seat to fellow Australian and 2005 Superbike World Champion Troy Corser.

For 2007, Pitt signed to race in MotoGP for the Ilmor team. He was forced to retire with mechanical problems from the first race of the season in Qatar. On 15 March 2007, Ilmor announced that they were taking a break from MotoGP as a result of funding issues. This left Pitt without a ride.

=== Return to Supersport ===
Later in 2007, Pitt made two substitute appearances in the Supersport World Championship for Ten Kate replacing the injured Sébastien Charpentier, taking two second places behind dominant teammate Kenan Sofuoğlu.

In 2008, Pitt raced in World Supersport for Ten Kate full-time, replacing Sofuoglu. In his first race, he collided with the crashed bike of teammate Jonathan Rea. He won three of the first six races to establish a championship lead. A collision with Eugene Laverty at Vallelunga threatened to derail his championship challenge, but he clinched the 2008 World Supersport championship in the penultimate round at Magny-Cours after closest rival Rea was taken out by Robbin Harms. During the Brands Hatch race in 2008, Pitt was involved in an accident that claimed the life of Craig Jones. The British rider fell in front of Pitt at Clark Curve, and Pitt's bike unavoidably struck the head of Jones, who died from his injuries on 4 August.

Pitt remained with the team for 2009, despite originally targeting a return to WSBK. He opened the season with two second places on the 2008 bike, but struggled once the 2009 model was introduced. He was replaced by Michele Pirro for 2010.

=== Return to Superbike ===
On 16 December 2009, it was announced that Pitt had agreed a contract with the Reitwagen Motorsport team to ride in the 2010 Superbike World Championship season. Pitt partnered teammate Roland Resch in riding a satellite version of the BMW S1000RR. However, the team pulled out after only three races due to a lack of funds.

=== British Superbike Championship ===
Pitt again changed direction following the demise of Reitwagen, joining Rob McElnea's team midway through the 2010 British Superbike Championship season as a replacement for Neil Hodgson, but he was injured in a crash at Brands Hatch and missed the rest of the season.

=== Retirement ===
In June 2011, Pitt, who was still recovering, became Gary Mason's crew chief at MSS Colchester Kawasaki in British Superbike Championship.

In January 2012, Pitt, having struggled with the shoulder injury suffered in 2010, announced his retirement from motorcycle racing.

Pitt worked as a crew chief in Superbike World Championship for Andrea Locatelli.

== Career statistics ==
=== All-time statistics ===
Series	Years	Races	Poles	Podiums	**Wins**	**2nd place**	**3rd place**	Fastest laps	Titles
World Supersport Championship	^{2000–2004, 2007–2009}	76	3	23	7	10	6	6	2
MotoGP	^{2002–2004}	20	0	0	0	0	0	0	0
World Superbike Championship	^{2005–2006, 2010}	53	0	6	1	2	3	1	0
British Superbike Championship	^{2010}	8	0	0	0	0	0	0	0
Total		157	3	29	8	12	9	7	2

=== Supersport World Championship ===
==== Races by year ====
(key) (Races in bold indicate pole position) (Races in italics indicate fastest lap)

Year	Bike	1	2	3	4	5	6	7	8	9	10	11	12	13	14	Pos	Pts
2000	Kawasaki	AUS; Ret	JPN; 8	GBR; 4	ITA; 13	GER; 17	SMR; 7	SPA; 8	EUR; 13	NED; 10	GER; Ret	GBR; 6				10th	60
2001	Kawasaki	SPA; 11	AUS; 3	JPN; 3	ITA; 4	GBR; 10	GER; 3	SMR; 8	EUR; 2	GER; 3	NED; 2	ITA; 4				**1st**	**149**
2002	Kawasaki	SPA; 5	**AUS**; 1	RSA; 1	JPN; 7	ITA; 4	GBR; Ret	GER; 2	SMR; 6	GBR; 18	GER; 4	NED; Ret	ITA; Ret			5th	126
2004	Yamaha	SPA	AUS	SMR	ITA	GER	GBR	GBR	NED; 3	ITA; 6	FRA; 6					12th	36
2007	Honda	QAT	AUS	EUR	SPA; 2	NED; 2	ITA	GBR	SMR	CZE	GBR	GER	ITA	FRA		17th	40
2008	Honda	QAT; Ret	**AUS**; 1	**SPA**; 19	NED; 1	ITA; 4	GER; 1	SMR; 1	CZE; 2	GBR; 3	EUR; 2	ITA; Ret	FRA; 1	POR; 2		**1st**	**214**
2009	Honda	AUS; 2	QAT; 2	SPA; 13	NED; Ret	ITA; 5	RSA; 6	USA; 7	SMR; Ret	GBR; 10	CZE; 10	GER; 7	ITA; 6	FRA; 6	POR; 11	6th	119

=== Grand Prix motorcycle racing ===
==== Races by year ====
(key) (Races in bold indicate pole position, races in italics indicate fastest lap)

Year	Class	Bike	1	2	3	4	5	6	7	8	9	10	11	12	13	14	15	16	17	18	Pos	Pts
2002	MotoGP	Kawasaki	JPN	RSA	SPA	FRA	ITA	CAT	NED	GBR	GER	CZE	POR	BRA	PAC	MAL; 19	AUS; 17	VAL; 12			26th	4
2003	MotoGP	Kawasaki	JPN; 17	RSA; 16	SPA; 15	FRA; Ret	ITA; 16	CAT; Ret	NED; 14	GBR; 17	GER; 19	CZE; 16	POR; 21	BRA; 18	PAC; 16	MAL; 16	AUS; 15	VAL; 18			26th	4
2004	MotoGP	Moriwaki	RSA	SPA	FRA	ITA; 17	CAT; 14	NED	BRA	GER	GBR	CZE; 16	POR	JPN	QAT	MAL	AUS	VAL			27th	2
2007	MotoGP	Ilmor GP	QAT; Ret	SPA	TUR	CHN	FRA	ITA	CAT	GBR	NED	GER	USA	CZE	RSM	POR	JPN	AUS	MAL	VAL	NC	0

=== Superbike World Championship ===
==== Races by year ====
(key) (Races in bold indicate pole position) (Races in italics indicate fastest lap)

Year	Bike	1		2		3		4		5		6		7		8		9		10		11		12		13		Pos	Pts
Year	Bike	R1	R2	R1	R2	R1	R2	R1	R2	R1	R2	R1	R2	R1	R2	R1	R2	R1	R2	R1	R2	R1	R2	R1	R2	R1	R2	Pos	Pts
2005	Yamaha	QAT; 4	QAT; 9	AUS; 5	AUS; Ret	SPA; Ret	SPA; 8	ITA; 5	ITA; 6	EUR; 13	EUR; 9	SMR; Ret	SMR; Ret	CZE; 10	CZE; Ret	GBR; 7	GBR; 6	NED; 5	NED; 5	GER; 6	GER; 6	ITA; 16	ITA; C	FRA; 6	FRA; 7			8th	156
2006	Yamaha	QAT; 3	QAT; 5	AUS; 9	AUS; 5	SPA; 10	SPA; 9	ITA; 5	ITA; 6	EUR; 5	EUR; 4	SMR; 16	SMR; 1	CZE; Ret	CZE; Ret	GBR; 4	GBR; 3	NED; 2	NED; 2	GER; 4	GER; Ret	ITA; 3	ITA; 4	FRA; 18	FRA; 5			5th	250
2010	BMW	AUS; 15	AUS; 15	POR; Ret	POR; 20	SPA; 15	SPA; 16	NED	NED	ITA	ITA	RSA	RSA	USA	USA	SMR	SMR	CZE	CZE	GBR	GBR	GER	GER	ITA	ITA	FRA	FRA	27th	3

=== British Superbike Championship ===
==== Races by year ====
(key) (Races in bold indicate pole position) (Races in italics indicate fastest lap)

Year	Bike	1		2		3		4		5		6		7			8			9		10		11		12			Pos	Pts
Year	Bike	R1	R2	R1	R2	R1	R2	R1	R2	R1	R2	R1	R2	R1	R2	R3	R1	R2	R3	R1	R2	R1	R2	R1	R2	R1	R2	R3	Pos	Pts
2010	Yamaha	BHI	BHI	THR	THR	OUL	OUL	CAD	CAD	MAL; 9	MAL; 10	KNO; 11	KNO; C	SNE; 14	SNE; 12	SNE; 8	BHGP; 11	BHGP; Ret	BHGP; DNS	CAD	CAD	CRO	CRO	SIL	SIL	OUL	OUL	OUL	21st	37
