= Karl Muggeridge =

Australian motorcycle racer

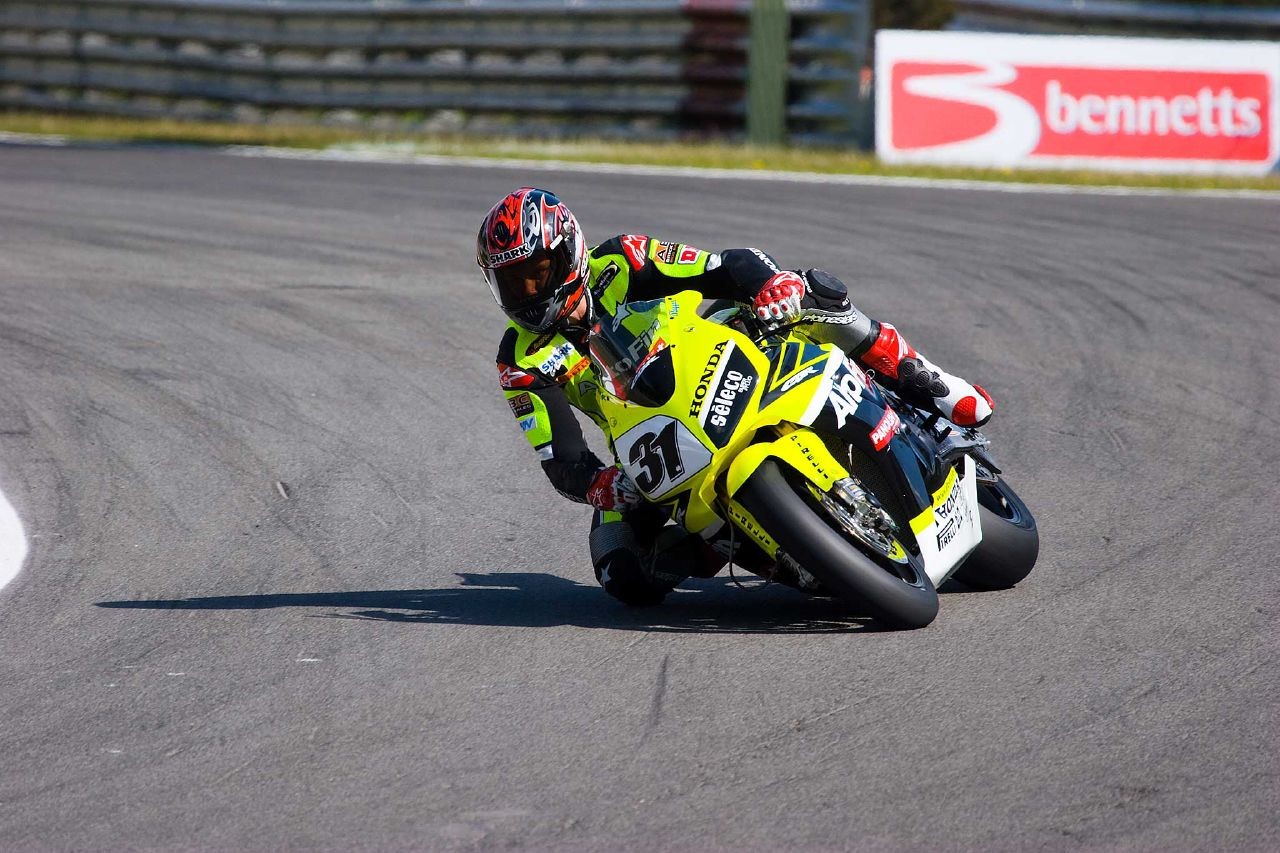
- Karl Muggeridge Brands Hatch 2007
- Nationality: Australian
- Born: 20 April 1974 (age 52); Tweed Heads, New South Wales, Australia
- Website: muggas.com

Karl Muggeridge born 20 April 1974 in Tweed Heads, New South Wales, Australia is a former professional motorcycle racer. He is married to Isobel, and has one son, Ryan Luca. He won the Supersport World Championship in 2004, and then raced in Superbike World Championship, primarily on Hondas.

== Early career ==
After several years of Motocross, Muggeridge began circuit racing in 1994, finishing fourth in his homeland's 250cc series a year later on a Suzuki. Over the next three years, he did an assortment of races around the world, primarily on 600cc Supersport bikes. He was a regular in his home series in 1996, and in the British championship for the next two years, coming fourth overall in 1999, before moving on to the Supersport World Championship.

== Supersport World Championship ==
Muggeridge was fifth overall in 2000, seventh in 2001, 14th in 2002 and fourth in 2003, before taking the 2004 crown as the lead rider for Ten Kate Honda, with seven wins and eight poles.

== Superbike World Championship ==
Ten Kate expanded its Superbike World Championship team to 2 Honda Fireblade bikes for 2005, and Muggeridge was moved up to join Chris Vermeulen, who won the WSS title for Ten Kate in 2003 and challenged for the WSBK crown as a series rookie in 2004. 2005 proved to be a tough year for Muggeridge, as he finished the season 11th overall with 124 points.

In 2006, a back injury caused Muggeridge to miss the Valencia round and he again failed to score a podium finish, despite strong qualifying runs including third at Brands Hatch. He finished the season 12th with 123 points.

Muggeridge lost his ride for 2007, and was offered a Supersport World Championship ride by the team. He instead remained in WSBK and on a Honda by joining countryman Josh Brookes at Alto Evolution. He missed his home race at Phillip Island after a crash in practice. At Monza he started 6th but crashed in the one race staged before heavy rain caused the event to be abandoned. The team missed Misano due to legal problems, and Brookes left the team, but Muggeridge returned at Brno. He finished the season 16th with 62 points.

For 2008, Muggeridge moved to the DFXtreme team, again on Hondas. He scored two sixth places among his fourteen points finishes, although he only scored four times in the last seven rounds, coming 15th overall.

For 2009, Muggeridge joined the Celani Suzuki team. He struggled throughout the season with his highest place finish of eighth in race 2 of the penultimate round at Magny-Cours, Karl did not race in the final round of the season. He also raced a couple of rounds in the British Superbike Championship for the HM Plant, Honda as a replacement rider for the injured Glen Richards.

== IDM German Superbike Championship ==
For 2010, Muggeridge moved into the IDM Superbike Championship riding the Holzhauer Racing Promotion Honda, collecting a pole position and a double race win at the opening round at the Lausitzring. He also took a double race win at Nürburgring in the third round of the season. Muggeridge went on to win the title with a total of 244 points, 19 clear of his closest rival. Muggeridge stayed in the German championship for 2011 to defend his title, he failed to win a race in the 2011 season and ended the championship in third on 200 points. Muggeridge also had a guest ride with the Castrol Honda team in the World Superbike Championship during the last round at Portimao, finishing both races outside the points.

== Career statistics ==
=== British Superbike Championship ===
==== By year ====
| Year | Bike | 1 | | | 2 | | | 3 | | | 4 | | | 5 | | | 6 | | | 7 | | | 8 | | | 9 | | | 10 | | | 11 | | | 12 | | | Pos | Pts |
| Year | Bike | R1 | R2 | R3 | R1 | R2 | R3 | R1 | R2 | R3 | R1 | R2 | R3 | R1 | R2 | R3 | R1 | R2 | R3 | R1 | R2 | R3 | R1 | R2 | R3 | R1 | R2 | R3 | R1 | R2 | R3 | R1 | R2 | R3 | R1 | R2 | R3 | Pos | Pts |
|---|---|---|---|---|---|---|---|---|---|---|---|---|---|---|---|---|---|---|---|---|---|---|---|---|---|---|---|---|---|---|---|---|---|---|---|---|---|---|---|
| 2009 | Honda | BHI | BHI | | OUL | OUL | | DON | DON | | THR | THR | | SNE | SNE | | KNO | KNO | | MAL | MAL | | BHGP; 4 | BHGP; 7 | BHGP; 6 | CAD; 7 | CAD; 13 | | CRO | CRO | | SIL | SIL | | OUL | OUL | OUL | 12th | 44 |
