= Toshiyuki Hamaguchi =

Japanese motorcycle racer (born 1970)

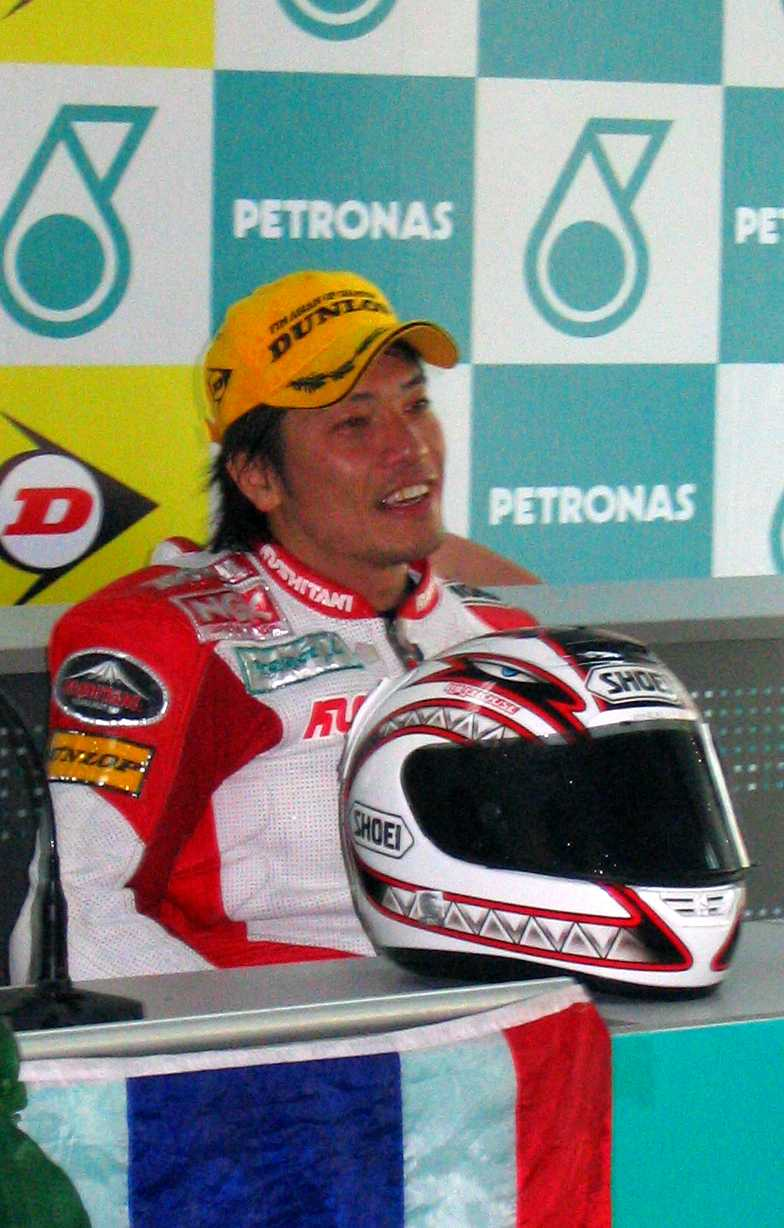
Toshiyuki Hamaguchi in Zhuhai in 2008

Toshiyuki Hamaguchi (kanji: 浜口俊之, born June 4, 1970) is a Japanese motorcycle racer who has won the 600cc Supersports class of the FIM Asian Grand Prix Championship six times: in 2002, 2003, 2004, 2005, 2006, and 2008.
