= Supersport World Championship =

International motorcycle racing

FIM Supersport World Championship
- Logo since 2022
- Category: Motorcycle racing
- Region: International
- Inaugural season: 1997
- Constructors: Ducati, Honda, Kawasaki, MV Agusta, Triumph, Yamaha
- Tyre suppliers: Pirelli
- Riders' champion: (Spain) Albert Arenas
- Makes' champion: (Japan) Yamaha
- Teams' champion: (Italy) AS bLU cRU Racing Team
- Official website: worldsbk.com

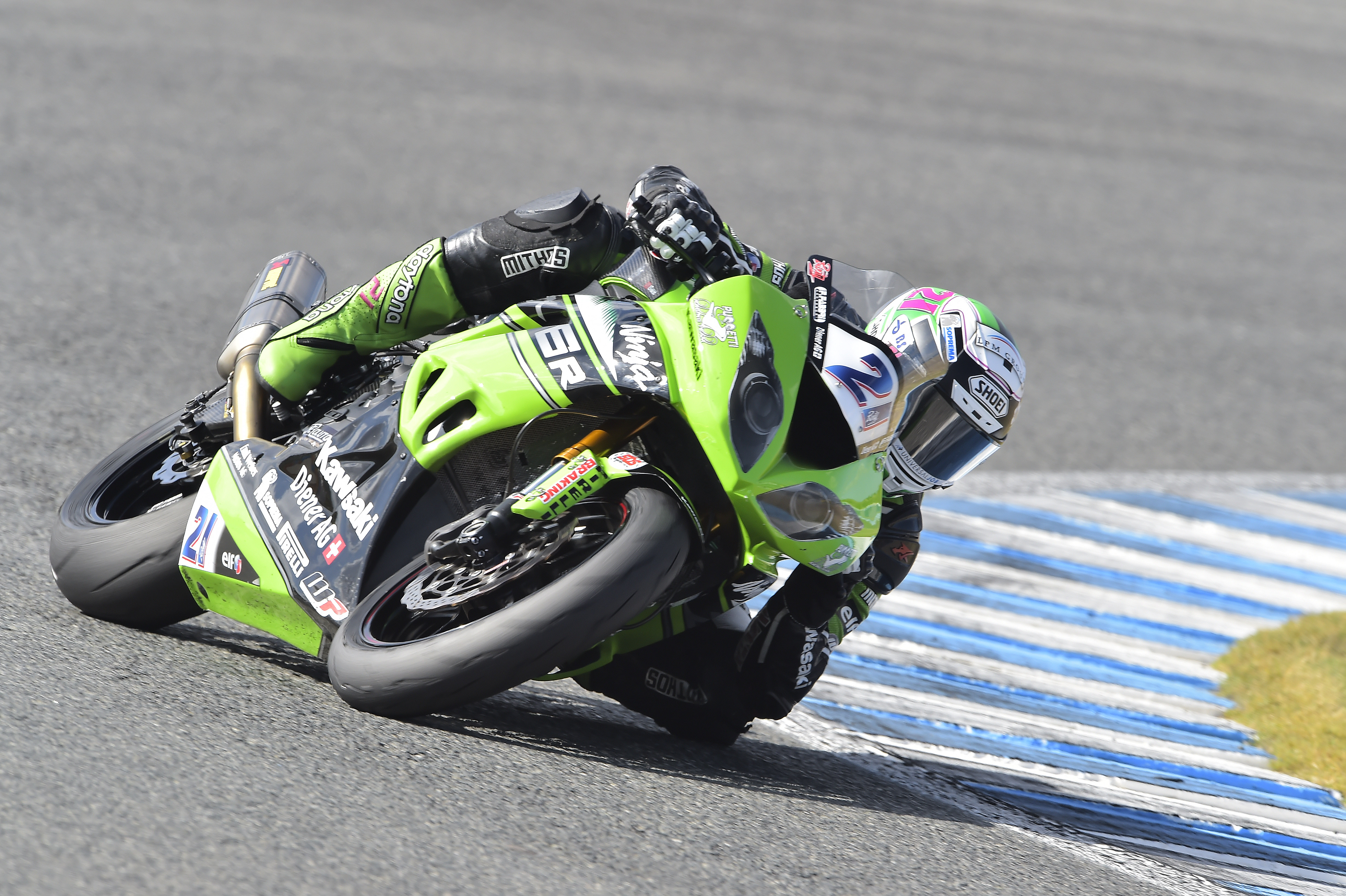
Randy Krummenacher riding his Kawasaki Ninja ZX-6R at Jerez

The Supersport World Championship, abbreviated to WorldSSP, is a motorcycle racing competition on hard-surfaced circuits, based on mid-sized sports motorcycles. Competition machines were originally based on production-based motorcycles with 600 cc to 955 cc engines, depending on the number of cylinders. After trials in UK national series British Supersport, from 2022 the regulations have changed to allow eligibility of larger-displacement engines, to reflect the engine sizes being produced and encourage different manufacturers.

The championship runs as a support class to the Superbike World Championship, which is similarly based on large production-based sports motorcycles. The championship, organized and promoted as its parent series by FGSport—renamed Infront Motor Sports in 2008—until 2012 and by Dorna from the 2013 season onwards, is sanctioned by the FIM.

== Overview ==
Supersport was introduced as a support class to the Superbike World Championship in 1990 as a European Championship. The series allows four-cylinder engines up to 600 cubic centimetres (37 cu in), three-cylinder engines up to 675 cubic centimetres (41.2 cu in), and twin-cylinder power plants up to 750 cubic centimetres (46 cu in). In 1997 the championship became a "World Series" and the European title was given to the European Motorcycle Union's European Road Racing Championship. The full title Supersport World Championship was introduced in 1999. Supersport racing has also been one of the most popular classes of national racing for many years.

Competition in the championship is typically fierce, and season domination by a single competitor is unusual. The 2001 championship was particularly notable in this respect, the champion being Andrew Pitt who did not win a single race, but amassed a championship-winning total of points by finishing near the front of the field in almost every race.

== Regulations ==
=== Technical regulations ===
Supersport regulations are much tighter than in Superbikes. The chassis of a supersport machine must remain largely as standard, while engine tuning is possible but tightly regulated. For instance, the displacement capacity, bore and stroke must remain at the homologated size. Modifying the bore and stroke to reach class limits is not allowed. As in World Superbike, a control tyre is used. From 2020 onwards, the tyres no longer have to be road legal and therefore slicks are allowed.

The 2022 season unveiled the "Next Generation" motorcycles and regulations which allowed motorcycles from "gaps in the market" between the traditional supersport configuration of 600cc inline 4 cylinders and superbikes.

The Next Generation regulations bought in headline rules of hard minimum weight, combined bike and rider weight, and maximum RPM limit. Due to these changes allowing a much more varied field, there is a big focus on balancing factors to bring fair competition. This includes concession parts, torque limited map with RPM limit, minimum weight, air restrictor, and modifications, all of which could be changed during the season based on balancing calculations and concession points.

To be eligible, a motorcycle must satisfy FIM's homologation requirements and have a four-stroke engine in one of the following configurations:

Cylinders	2012		2022		2025	
Cylinders	From (cc)	To (cc)	From (cc)	To (cc)	From (cc)	To (cc)
4	400	600	400	600	400	800
3	600	800	500	675	500	900
2	800	955	600	750	660	990

As of 2025, the specifically homologated machines with weight limits are:

Brand	Bike Weight		Combined Minimum Bike and Rider Weight (kg)
Brand	Hard Minimum (kg)	Soft Maximum (kg)	Combined Minimum Bike and Rider Weight (kg)
Ducati Panigale V2	166	175	244
Honda CBR600RR	161	170	239
Kawasaki ZX-6R	161	170	239
**Kawasaki ZX-6R-636**	161	170	239
MV Agusta F3	161	170	239
MV Agusta F3 800	161	170	239
MV Agusta F3 Superveloce	161	170	239
Suzuki GSX-R600	161	170	239
Suzuki GSX-R750	161	170	239
Triumph 675R	161	170	239
Triumph ST765RS	161	170	239
Yamaha YZF-R6	161	170	239
**Yamaha YZF-R9**	166	175	244
**QJ Motor SRK 800**	161	170	239

(Bold indicates a 2025 addition from the 2023 list.)

Formerly homologated motorcycles include Bimota YB9, Ducati 748, Ducati 749, Honda CBR600F, MV Agusta F3 675, Triumph Daytona 600, Triumph Daytona 675, and Yamaha YZF600R.

=== Sporting regulations ===
A Supersport World Championship race takes place at almost every Superbike World Championship round. Starting positions are decided by the riders' fastest laps from two 45-minute qualifying sessions. Each race is approximately 100 kilometres (62 mi) long. Typically, the race takes place between the two Superbike races.

The points system is the same for the riders' championship and the manufacturers' championship, but only the highest-finishing motorcycle by a particular manufacturer is awarded the points for the latter championship.

Points scoring system
Position	1	2	3	4	5	6	7	8	9	10	11	12	13	14	15
Points	25	20	16	13	11	10	9	8	7	6	5	4	3	2	1

== Riders ==
Riders from all over the world compete in World Supersport, mostly from Europe.

Several riders who were successful in World Supersport have moved on to high-level competitions, notably, Cal Crutchlow, Chaz Davies, and Chris Vermeulen, though others such as Fabien Foret and Kenan Sofuoğlu have spent several years in this championship. Notable female rider María Herrera entered a few races in World Supersport.

== WorldSSP Challenge ==
Starting in 2016, the World Supersport Challenge, a separate points-scoring competition was held at the European-rounds of the Supersport World Championship, run as a category within the main races. Previously, it was known as the European Supersport Cup until 2020.

Year	Rider	Team	Bike
2016	(Italy) Axel Bassani	(Italy) San Carlo Team Italia	(Japan) Kawasaki ZX-6R
2017	(Estonia) Hannes Soomer	(United Kingdom) WILSport Racedays	(Japan) Honda CBR600RR
2018	(Netherlands) Rob Hartog	(Netherlands) Hartog - Against Cancer	(Japan) Kawasaki ZX-6R
2019	(United Kingdom) Kyle Smith	(Italy) Pedercini Racing	(Japan) Kawasaki ZX-6R
2020	(Italy) Kevin Manfredi	(Italy) Altogo Racing	(Japan) Yamaha YZF-R6
2021	(Italy) Kevin Manfredi	(Italy) Altogo Racing	(Japan) Yamaha YZF-R6
2022	(Turkey) Bahattin Sofuoğlu	(Italy) MV Agusta Reparto Corse	(Italy) MV Agusta F3 800 RR
2023	(United Kingdom) Tom Booth-Amos	(Italy) Motozoo ME AIR Racing	(Japan) Kawasaki ZX-6R
2024	(Italy) Simone Corsi	(Italy) Renzi Corse	(Italy) Ducati Panigale V2
2025	(France) Corentin Perolari	(France) HONDA RACING World Supersport	(Japan) Honda CBR600RR

== Champions ==
Season	Rider champion	Team	Motorcycle	Manufacturer champion
World Series
1997	(Italy) Paolo Casoli	Gio.Ca.Moto	Ducati 748	(Italy) Ducati
1998	(Italy) Fabrizio Pirovano	Team Alstare Corona	Suzuki GSX-R600	(Japan) Suzuki
World Championship
1999	(France) Stéphane Chambon	Suzuki Alstare F.S.	Suzuki GSX-R600	(Japan) Yamaha
2000	(Germany) Jörg Teuchert	Alpha Technik Yamaha	Yamaha YZF-R6	(Japan) Yamaha
2001	(Australia) Andrew Pitt	Fuchs Kawasaki	Kawasaki ZX-6R	(Japan) Yamaha
2002	(France) Fabien Foret	Ten Kate Honda	Honda CBR600F	(Japan) Suzuki
2003	(Australia) Chris Vermeulen	Ten Kate Honda	Honda CBR600RR	(Japan) Honda
2004	(Australia) Karl Muggeridge	Ten Kate Honda	Honda CBR600RR	(Japan) Honda
2005	(France) Sébastien Charpentier	Winston Ten Kate Honda	Honda CBR600RR	(Japan) Honda
2006	(France) Sébastien Charpentier	Winston Ten Kate Honda	Honda CBR600RR	(Japan) Honda
2007	(Turkey) Kenan Sofuoğlu	Hannspree Ten Kate Honda	Honda CBR600RR	(Japan) Honda
2008	(Australia) Andrew Pitt	Hannspree Ten Kate Honda	Honda CBR600RR	(Japan) Honda
2009	(United Kingdom) Cal Crutchlow	Yamaha World Supersport	Yamaha YZF-R6	(Japan) Honda
2010	(Turkey) Kenan Sofuoğlu	Hannspree Ten Kate Honda	Honda CBR600RR	(Japan) Honda
2011	(United Kingdom) Chaz Davies	Yamaha ParkinGO Team	Yamaha YZF-R6	(Japan) Yamaha
2012	(Turkey) Kenan Sofuoğlu	Kawasaki Lorenzini	Kawasaki ZX-6R	(Japan) Honda
2013	(United Kingdom) Sam Lowes	Yakhnich Motorsport	Yamaha YZF-R6	(Japan) Kawasaki
2014	(Netherlands) Michael van der Mark	PATA Honda World Supersport	Honda CBR600RR	(Japan) Honda
2015	(Turkey) Kenan Sofuoğlu	Kawasaki Puccetti Racing	Kawasaki ZX-6R	(Japan) Kawasaki
2016	(Turkey) Kenan Sofuoğlu	Kawasaki Puccetti Racing	Kawasaki ZX-6R	(Japan) Kawasaki
2017	(France) Lucas Mahias	GRT Yamaha Official WorldSSP Team	Yamaha YZF-R6	(Japan) Yamaha
2018	(Germany) Sandro Cortese	Kallio Racing	Yamaha YZF-R6	(Japan) Yamaha
2019	(Switzerland) Randy Krummenacher	BARDAHL Evan Bros. WorldSSP Team	Yamaha YZF-R6	(Japan) Yamaha
2020	(Italy) Andrea Locatelli	BARDAHL Evan Bros. WorldSSP Team	Yamaha YZF-R6	(Japan) Yamaha
2021	(Switzerland) Dominique Aegerter	Ten Kate Racing Yamaha	Yamaha YZF-R6	(Japan) Yamaha
2022	(Switzerland) Dominique Aegerter	Ten Kate Racing Yamaha	Yamaha YZF-R6	(Japan) Yamaha
2023	(Italy) Nicolò Bulega	Aruba Racing	Ducati Panigale V2	(Italy) Ducati
2024	(Spain) Adrián Huertas	Aruba Racing	Ducati Panigale V2	(Italy) Ducati
2025	(Italy) Stefano Manzi	Ten Kate Racing Yamaha	Yamaha YZF-R9	(Japan) Yamaha
2026	(Spain) Albert Arenas	AS bLU cRU Racing Team	Yamaha YZF-R9	(Japan) Yamaha

By rider
Rider	Championships	Year
(Turkey) Kenan Sofuoğlu	5	2007, 2010, 2012, 2015, 2016
(France) Sébastien Charpentier	2	2005, 2006
(Australia) Andrew Pitt	2	2001, 2008
(Switzerland) Dominique Aegerter	2	2021, 2022
(Italy) Paolo Casoli	1	1997
(Italy) Fabrizio Pirovano	1	1998
(France) Stéphane Chambon	1	1999
(Germany) Jörg Teuchert	1	2000
(France) Fabien Foret	1	2002
(Australia) Chris Vermeulen	1	2003
(Australia) Karl Muggeridge	1	2004
(United Kingdom) Cal Crutchlow	1	2009
(United Kingdom) Chaz Davies	1	2011
(United Kingdom) Sam Lowes	1	2013
(Netherlands) Michael van der Mark	1	2014
(France) Lucas Mahias	1	2017
(Germany) Sandro Cortese	1	2018
(Switzerland) Randy Krummenacher	1	2019
(Italy) Andrea Locatelli	1	2020
(Italy) Nicolò Bulega	1	2023
(Spain) Adrián Huertas	1	2024
(Italy) Stefano Manzi	1	2025
(Spain) Albert Arenas	1	2026

By manufacturer
Manufacturer	Championships	Year
(Japan) Yamaha	12	1999, 2000, 2001, 2011, 2017, 2018, 2019, 2020, 2021, 2022, 2025, 2026
(Japan) Honda	10	2003, 2004, 2005, 2006, 2007, 2008, 2009, 2010, 2012, 2014
(Japan) Kawasaki	3	2013, 2015, 2016
(Italy) Ducati	3	1997, 2023, 2024
(Japan) Suzuki	2	1998, 2002

== See also ==
- Supersport 300 World Championship
- Superbike racing
- Grand Prix motorcycle racing
- Isle of Man TT
