= Katsuaki Fujiwara =

Japanese motorcycle racer

- Nationality: Japanese
- Born: 27 March 1975 (age 51); Shimonoseki, Yamaguchi Prefecture, Japan
Motorcycle racing career statistics
Grand Prix motorcycle racing
Active years	1996, 1998
First race	1996 500cc Malaysian Grand Prix
Last race	1998 500cc Catalunya Grand Prix
Team	Suzuki
Championships	0
Starts / Wins / Podiums / Poles / F. laps / Points; 4 / 0 / 0 / 0 / 0 / 0
Superbike World Championship
Active years	1995–2000
Manufacturers	Kawasaki, Suzuki
Championships	0
2000 championship position	9th (151 pts)
Starts / Wins / Podiums / Poles / F. laps / Points; 59 / 0 / 2 / 0 / 0 / 306
Supersport World Championship
Active years	2001–2010
Manufacturers	Suzuki, Honda, Kawasaki
Championships	0
2010 championship position	10th (81 pts)
Starts / Wins / Podiums / Poles / F. laps / Points; 114 / 6 / 21 / 5 / 7 / 874

Katsuaki Fujiwara (born 27 March 1975 in Shimonoseki, Yamaguchi Prefecture, Japan) is a former professional motorcycle racer. He last competed in the Asia Road Race Championship in the SS600 class aboard a Kawasaki ZX-6R, where he was champion in 2011 and runner-up behind Ryuichi Kiyonari in 2012 and 2013 behind Azlan Shah Kamaruzaman. He is mostly known for his time spent in the Supersport World Championship, a championship where he gained his best result of second overall in 2002. He has also raced in the Superbike World Championship, and in the All Japan Road Race Championship.
