= Paolo Casoli =

Italian motorcycle racer (born 1965)

- Nationality: Italian
- Born: 18 August 1965 (age 61); Castelnovo ne' Monti, Italy
Motorcycle racing career statistics
Grand Prix motorcycle racing
| Active years | 1984, 1986 - 1993 |
| First race | 1984 125cc West German Grand Prix |
| Last race | 1993 250cc Italian Grand Prix |
| First win | 1987 125cc Portuguese Grand Prix |
| Last win | 1987 125cc Portuguese Grand Prix |
Starts / Wins / Podiums / Poles / F. laps / Points; 86 / 1 / 5 / 1 / 0 / 189

Paolo Casoli (born 18 August 1965 in Castelnovo ne' Monti) is an Italian former Grand Prix motorcycle road racer. His best year in Grands Prix was in 1987, when he won the 125cc Portuguese Grand Prix and finished in third place in the 125cc world championship. From 1994 to 1996, Casoli competed in the Superbike World Championship, and in 1997, he won the Supersport World Series, which later became known as the Supersport World Championship. He continued racing in the Supersport class until 2002.

Sporting positions
| Preceded by none | World Supersport Champion; 1997 | Succeeded by Fabrizio Pirovano |
