= 2005 Superbike World Championship =

2005 Superbike World Championship
Previous:	2004	Next:	2006
Support series: Supersport World Championship; FIM Superstock 1000 Cup; European Superstock 600 Championship

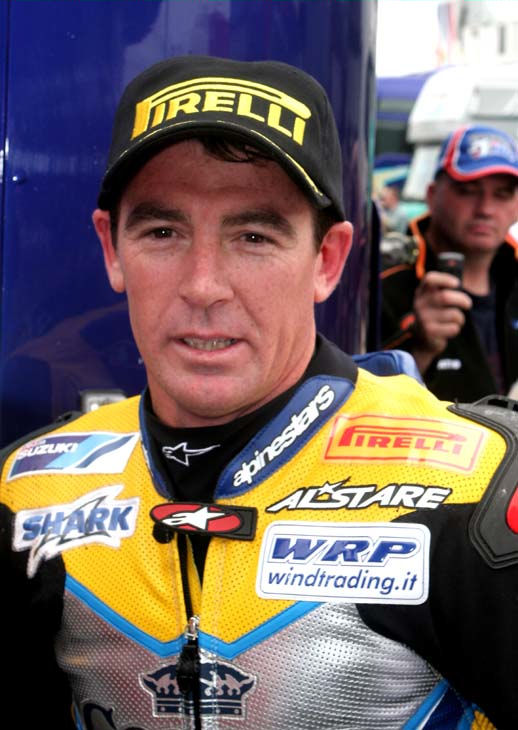
Troy Corser claimed his second Superbike World Championship title.

The 2005 Superbike World Championship was the eighteenth FIM Superbike World Championship season. The season started on 26 February at Losail and finished on 9 October at Magny-Cours after 12 rounds and 23 races (the second race at the Imola round was cancelled due to heavy rain). 2005 saw the return of the Japanese manufacturers with major teams from all four Japanese manufacturers ran through European importers' teams.

Troy Corser won his second riders' championship, contributing to Suzuki's first World Superbike manufacturers' championship.

== Race calendar and results ==
2005 Superbike World Championship Calendar
Round		Circuit	Date	Superpole	Fastest lap	Winning rider	Winning team	Report
1	R1	(Qatar) Losail	26 February	(France) Régis Laconi	(Japan) Yukio Kagayama	(Australia) Troy Corser	Alstare Suzuki	Report
1	R2	(Qatar) Losail	26 February	(France) Régis Laconi	(France) Sébastien Gimbert	(Japan) Yukio Kagayama	Alstare Suzuki	Report
2	R1	(Australia) Phillip Island	3 April	(Japan) Yukio Kagayama	(Australia) Troy Corser	(Australia) Troy Corser	Alstare Suzuki	Report
2	R2	(Australia) Phillip Island	3 April	(Japan) Yukio Kagayama	(Australia) Troy Corser	(Australia) Troy Corser	Alstare Suzuki	Report
3	R1	(Spain) Valencia	24 April	(Australia) Troy Corser	(Australia) Troy Corser	(Australia) Troy Corser	Alstare Suzuki	Report
3	R2	(Spain) Valencia	24 April	(Australia) Troy Corser	(Australia) Troy Corser	(Australia) Troy Corser	Alstare Suzuki	Report
4	R1	(Italy) Monza	8 May	(Japan) Yukio Kagayama	(Japan) Yukio Kagayama	(Australia) Troy Corser	Alstare Suzuki	Report
4	R2	(Italy) Monza	8 May	(Japan) Yukio Kagayama	(Australia) Chris Vermeulen	(Australia) Chris Vermeulen	Ten Kate Honda	Report
5	R1	(Europe) Silverstone	29 May	(Japan) Yukio Kagayama	(France) Régis Laconi	(France) Régis Laconi	Xerox Ducati	Report
5	R2	(Europe) Silverstone	29 May	(Japan) Yukio Kagayama	(Australia) Troy Corser	(United Kingdom) James Toseland	Xerox Ducati	Report
6	R1	(San Marino) Misano	26 June	(Australia) Troy Corser	(Australia) Chris Vermeulen	(France) Régis Laconi	Xerox Ducati	Report
6	R2	(San Marino) Misano	26 June	(Australia) Troy Corser	(France) Régis Laconi	(France) Régis Laconi	Xerox Ducati	Report
7	R1	(Czech Republic) Brno	17 July	(Australia) Troy Corser	(Australia) Troy Corser	(Australia) Troy Corser	Alstare Suzuki	Report
7	R2	(Czech Republic) Brno	17 July	(Australia) Troy Corser	(Japan) Noriyuki Haga	(Japan) Noriyuki Haga	Yamaha Motor Italia	Report
8	R1	(United Kingdom) Brands Hatch	7 August	(Australia) Troy Corser	(Japan) Noriyuki Haga	(Australia) Troy Corser	Alstare Suzuki	Report
8	R2	(United Kingdom) Brands Hatch	7 August	(Australia) Troy Corser	(Japan) Noriyuki Haga	(Japan) Noriyuki Haga	Yamaha Motor Italia	Report
9	R1	(Netherlands) Assen	4 September	(Australia) Chris Vermeulen	(Australia) Chris Vermeulen	(Australia) Chris Vermeulen	Ten Kate Honda	Report
9	R2	(Netherlands) Assen	4 September	(Australia) Chris Vermeulen	(Japan) Noriyuki Haga	(Australia) Chris Vermeulen	Ten Kate Honda	Report
10	R1	(Germany) EuroSpeedway Lausitz	11 September	(Italy) Lorenzo Lanzi	(Japan) Noriyuki Haga	(Australia) Chris Vermeulen	Ten Kate Honda	Report
10	R2	(Germany) EuroSpeedway Lausitz	11 September	(Italy) Lorenzo Lanzi	(Japan) Noriyuki Haga	(Italy) Lorenzo Lanzi	Xerox Ducati	Report
11	R1	(Italy) Imola	2 October	(Australia) Chris Vermeulen	(Australia) Troy Corser	(Australia) Chris Vermeulen	Ten Kate Honda	Report
11	R2	(Italy) Imola	2 October	(Australia) Chris Vermeulen	Cancelled due to rain			Report
12	R1	(France) Magny-Cours	9 October	(Australia) Chris Vermeulen	(Australia) Chris Vermeulen	(Australia) Chris Vermeulen	Ten Kate Honda	Report
12	R2	(France) Magny-Cours	9 October	(Australia) Chris Vermeulen	(Italy) Lorenzo Lanzi	(Italy) Lorenzo Lanzi	Ducati SC Caracchi	Report

== Championship standings ==
=== Riders' standings ===
2005 final riders' standings
Pos.	Rider	Bike	QAT (Qatar)		AUS (Australia)		ESP (Spain)		ITA (Italy)		EUR (Europe)		SMR (San Marino)		CZE (Czech Republic)		GBR (United Kingdom)		NED (Netherlands)		GER (Germany)		ITA (Italy)		FRA (France)		Pts
Pos.	Rider	Bike	R1	R2	R1	R2	R1	R2	R1	R2	R1	R2	R1	R2	R1	R2	R1	R2	R1	R2	R1	R2	R1	R2	R1	R2	Pts
1	(Australia) Troy Corser	Suzuki	1	3	1	1	**1**	**1**	1	3	2	2	**3**	**3**	**1**	**2**	**1**	**2**	4	4	3	13	2	C	5	4	**433**
2	(Australia) Chris Vermeulen	Honda	8	4	3	4	2	2	Ret	1	4	4	2	2	8	3	4	3	**1**	**1**	1	2	**1**	**C**	**1**	**Ret**	**379**
3	(Japan) Noriyuki Haga	Yamaha	5	11	Ret	Ret	5	4	11	9	Ret	3	6	6	7	1	2	1	3	2	2	3	3	C	Ret	3	**271**
4	(United Kingdom) James Toseland	Ducati	6	6	14	Ret	8	19	3	5	3	1	4	4	2	8	Ret	7	2	3	4	11	4	C	3	6	**254**
5	(Japan) Yukio Kagayama	Suzuki	2	1	**2**	**2**	3	7	**2**	**Ret**	**11**	**7**	Ret	12	11	11	9	9	6	11	5	4	15	C	2	2	**252**
6	(France) Régis Laconi	Ducati	**3**	**2**	7	7	DNS	DNS	4	2	1	Ret	1	1	3	7	3	5	DNS	DNS			9	C	DNS	DNS	**221**
7	(United Kingdom) Chris Walker	Kawasaki	14	Ret	9	Ret	4	3	8	8	6	6	8	11	4	10	5	4	Ret	DNS	Inj	Inj	6	C	7	5	**160**
8	(Australia) Andrew Pitt	Yamaha	4	9	5	Ret	Ret	8	5	6	13	9	Ret	Ret	10	Ret	7	6	5	5	6	6	16	C	6	7	**156**
9	(Italy) Lorenzo Lanzi	Ducati	Ret	12	**DSQ**	13	Ret	DNS			Ret	11	5	9	6	6	8	8	7	6	**8**	**1**	Ret	C	9	1	**150**
10	(Italy) Pierfrancesco Chili	Honda	Ret	5	DNS	DNS	7	10	7	7	5	5	7	5	5	5	Ret	13	10	14	Ret	10	Ret	C	Ret	10	**131**
11	(Australia) Karl Muggeridge	Honda	9	Ret	8	Ret	Ret	Ret	6	4	10	10	10	7	13	9	6	Ret	9	8	Ret	5	Ret	C	4	DNS	**124**
12	(Germany) Max Neukirchner	Honda	Ret	8	4	3	Ret	12	Ret	Ret	7	18	Ret	Ret	14	Ret	10	11	8	7	7	7	7	C	8	8	**123**
13	(Japan) Norick Abe	Yamaha	10	7	6	8	Ret	5	10	12	Ret	8	Ret	15	9	4	11	Ret	Ret	9	9	8	Ret	C	10	9	**123**
14	(Italy) Giovanni Bussei	Kawasaki	11	14	10	9	13	Ret	13	11	8	16	Ret	10	Ret	15	Ret	Ret	15	15	12	12	11	C	13	DNS	**64**
15	(United States) Ben Bostrom	Honda	16	Ret	Ret	11	12	6	18	18	Ret	14	14	Ret	20	18	12	10	18	10	10	15	13	C	12	11	**58**
16	(France) Sébastien Gimbert	Yamaha	Ret	10	11	Ret	6	11	17	Ret	Ret	DNS			19	17	16	14	12	13	Ret	14	8	C	15	Ret	**46**
17	(Spain) Fonsi Nieto	Ducati	13	13	Ret	5	17	Ret	16	Ret	Ret	Ret	9	Ret	12	12	Ret	Ret									**37**
17	(Spain) Fonsi Nieto	Kawasaki																					Ret	C	14	13	**37**
18	(Australia) Steve Martin	Petronas	15	Ret	Ret	Ret	Ret	17	Ret	Ret	Ret	20	11	8	17	16	15	Ret	14	16	18	9	5	C	Ret	DNS	**35**
19	(Italy) Mauro Sanchini	Kawasaki	18	15	12	10	Ret	18	14	13	12	17	12	13	Ret	DNS			19	Ret			12	C	16	17	**31**
20	(Italy) Ivan Clementi	Kawasaki	Ret	Ret	13	Ret	11	13	15	15																	**26**
20	(Italy) Ivan Clementi	Ducati									Ret	12	15	Ret	Ret	13	19	Ret	11	Ret	Ret	Ret	Ret	C	17	Ret	**26**
21	(Spain) David Checa	Yamaha					10	9							15	14									11	12	**25**
22	(Australia) Garry McCoy	Petronas	17	16	Ret	Ret	Ret	Ret	Ret	21	Ret	13	Ret	Ret	Ret	DNS	18	Ret	13	12	11	Ret	DNS	C			**15**
23	(Italy) Gianluca Nannelli	Ducati							9	10																	**13**
24	(Spain) José Luis Cardoso	Yamaha	Ret	Ret	Ret	Ret	Ret	Ret	19	Ret	9	Ret	13	Ret	16	Ret	20	Ret	17	Ret	13	Ret					**13**
25	(Italy) Alessio Corradi	Ducati			Ret	6																					**10**
26	(Spain) Iván Silva	Yamaha	7	Ret			15	Ret															Ret	C			**10**
27	(Italy) Marco Borciani	Yamaha	12	Ret	Ret	Ret	18	Ret	12	Ret																	**10**
27	(Italy) Marco Borciani	Ducati											Ret	DNS	18	Ret	Ret	Ret	Ret	Ret	NC	Ret	14	C	Ret	Ret	**10**
28	(Italy) Gianluca Vizziello	Yamaha	19	17	Ret	Ret	16	14	21	Ret			17	Ret	21	Ret	17	17	16	Ret	Ret	Ret	10	C	Ret	15	**9**
29	(Spain) Sergio Fuertes	Suzuki					9	16																			**7**
30	(Spain) Pere Riba	Kawasaki															14	12									**6**
31	(New Zealand) Andrew Stroud	Suzuki			15	12																					**5**
32	(Italy) Lorenzo Alfonsi	Yamaha			Ret	Ret	14	15	Ret	16	Ret	DNS	16	14	22	20	18	16	Ret	Ret							**5**
33	(United Kingdom) Dennis Hobbs	Yamaha															13	15									4
34	(Portugal) Miguel Praia	Yamaha	20	18	16	14	Ret	Ret	23	Ret	15	Ret	18	16	23	21	Ret	Ret	21	19	16	18					**3**
35	(France) Julien da Costa	Yamaha																							Ret	14	**2**
36	(Italy) Norino Brignola	Ducati											Ret	Ret							14	16					**2**
37	(Italy) Alessio Velini	Ducati	Ret	Ret			Ret	Ret	22	17	14	19	Ret	Ret	Ret	19	Ret	Ret	Ret	18	Ret	17	Ret	C	Ret	18	2
38	(Italy) Luca Conforti	Ducati							20	14			Ret	Ret													**2**
39	(Italy) Stefano Cruciani	Kawasaki																			15	Ret					**1**
40	(Italy) Massimo Roccoli	Yamaha									Ret	15															**1**
	(Belgium) Michel Nickmans	Yamaha					19	Ret	25	Ret	16	21	Ret	Ret	24	22	Ret	Ret	Ret	20	17	Ret	Ret	C	19	19	0
	(France) Vincent Philippe	Suzuki																							18	16	0
	(Italy) Maurizio Prattichizzo	Kawasaki																					17	C			0
	(Italy) Giuseppe Zannini	Yamaha											19	17													0
	(Italy) Giuseppe Zannini	Ducati																					Ret	C	Ret	21	0
	(Netherlands) Jurgen van den Goorbergh	Suzuki																	20	17							0
	(Poland) Adam Badziak	Suzuki											20	18	25	Ret									DNQ	DNQ	0
	(Italy) Paolo Blora	Yamaha							24	19																	0
	(Italy) Paolo Blora	Ducati											Ret	Ret													0
	(France) Laurent Brian	Kawasaki																							Ret	20	0
	(Italy) Andrea Mazzali	MV Agusta							Ret	20													Ret	DNS			0
	(Netherlands) Robert Menzen	Suzuki																	22	21							0
	(Netherlands) Paul Mooijman	Yamaha																	23	22							0
	(Czech Republic) Miloš Čihák	Suzuki													27	23											0
	(Czech Republic) Jiří Trčka	Ducati													28	24											0
	(Slovakia) Jiří Dražďák	Yamaha													26	Ret											0
	(United Kingdom) Andy Notman	Petronas																							Ret	Ret	0
	(Italy) Alessandro Gramigni	Yamaha																					Ret	C			0
	(Czech Republic) Jiří Mrkývka	Ducati													Ret	Ret			Ret	Ret	Ret	Ret	Ret	C			0
	(Italy) Luca Pini	Honda																					Ret	C			0
	(Italy) Lucio Pedercini	Ducati	Ret	Ret	Ret	Ret	Ret	Ret	DNS	DNS			Ret	Ret					Ret	Ret	Ret	Ret	Ret	C			0
	(Italy) Mauro Lucchiari	Yamaha																					Ret	C			0
	(Germany) Michael Schulten	Honda																			Ret	Ret					0
	(Germany) Ralf Waldmann	Honda																			Ret	DNS					0
	(Netherlands) Bob Withag	Yamaha																	Ret	DNS							0
	(Slovakia) Marek Svoboda	Yamaha													Ret	DNS											0
	(Italy) Michele Gallini	MV Agusta											Ret	Ret													0
	(Italy) Luca Pedersoli	Ducati							Ret	Ret			DNA	DNA													0
	(Qatar) Talal Al-Nuami	Yamaha	Ret	Ret																							0
	(Spain) Bernat Martínez	Yamaha					DNS	DNS																			
	(Netherlands) Bertus Folkertsma	Suzuki																	DNQ	DNQ							
Pos.	Rider	Bike	QAT (Qatar)		AUS (Australia)		ESP (Spain)		ITA (Italy)		EUR (Europe)		SMR (San Marino)		CZE (Czech Republic)		GBR (United Kingdom)		NED (Netherlands)		GER (Germany)		ITA (Italy)		FRA (France)		Pts

Colour	Result
Gold	Winner
Silver	Second place
Bronze	Third place
Green	Points classification
Blue	Non-points classification
Blue	Non-classified finish (NC)
Purple	Retired, not classified (Ret)
Red	Did not qualify (DNQ)
Red	Did not pre-qualify (DNPQ)
Black	Disqualified (DSQ)
White	Did not start (DNS)
White	Withdrew (WD)
White	Race cancelled (C)
Blank	Did not practice (DNP)
Blank	Did not arrive (DNA)
Blank	Excluded (EX)

**Bold** – Pole position
Italics – Fastest lap

=== Manufacturers' standings ===
Pos.	Manufacturer	QAT (Qatar)		AUS (Australia)		ESP (Spain)		ITA (Italy)		EUR (Europe)		SMR (San Marino)		CZE (Czech Republic)		GBR (United Kingdom)		NED (Netherlands)		GER (Germany)		ITA (Italy)		FRA (France)		Pts
Pos.	Manufacturer	R1	R2	R1	R2	R1	R2	R1	R2	R1	R2	R1	R2	R1	R2	R1	R2	R1	R2	R1	R2	R1	R2	R1	R2	Pts
1	(Japan) Suzuki	1	1	1	1	1	1	1	3	2	2	3	3	1	2	1	2	4	4	3	4	2	C	2	2	468
2	(Japan) Honda	8	4	3	3	2	2	6	1	4	4	2	2	5	3	4	3	1	1	1	2	1	C	1	8	403
3	(Italy) Ducati	3	2	7	5	8	19	3	2	1	1	1	1	2	6	3	5	2	3	4	1	4	C	3	1	385
4	(Japan) Yamaha	4	7	5	8	5	4	5	6	9	3	6	6	7	1	2	1	3	2	2	3	3	C	6	3	322
5	(Japan) Kawasaki	11	14	9	9	4	3	8	8	6	6	8	10	4	10	5	4	15	15	12	12	6	C	7	5	183
6	(Malaysia) Petronas	15	16	Ret	Ret	Ret	17	Ret	21	Ret	13	11	8	17	16	15	18	13	12	11	9	5	C	Ret	Ret	48
NC	(Italy) MV Agusta							Ret	20			Ret	Ret									Ret	C			0
Pos.	Manufacturer	QAT (Qatar)		AUS (Australia)		ESP (Spain)		ITA (Italy)		EUR (Europe)		SMR (San Marino)		CZE (Czech Republic)		GBR (United Kingdom)		NED (Netherlands)		GER (Germany)		ITA (Italy)		FRA (France)		Pts

== Entry list ==
Team	Constructor	Motorcycle	No	Rider	Rounds
(Italy) Ducati Xerox	Ducati	Ducati 999F05	1	(United Kingdom) James Toseland	All
(Italy) Ducati Xerox	Ducati	Ducati 999F05	55	(France) Régis Laconi	1–9, 11–12
(Italy) Ducati Xerox	Ducati	Ducati 999F05	57	(Italy) Lorenzo Lanzi	10
Yamaha Motor France-Ipone	Yamaha	Yamaha YZF-R1	3	(Japan) Norick Abe	All
Yamaha Motor France-Ipone	Yamaha	Yamaha YZF-R1	32	(France) Sébastien Gimbert	1–5, 7–12
Yamaha Motor France-Ipone	Yamaha	Yamaha YZF-R1	39	(Italy) Alessandro Gramigni	11
(San Marino) PSG-1 Kawasaki Corse	Kawasaki	Kawasaki ZX-10R	6	(Italy) Mauro Sanchini	1–7, 9, 11–12
(San Marino) PSG-1 Kawasaki Corse	Kawasaki	Kawasaki ZX-10R	9	(United Kingdom) Chris Walker	1–9, 11–12
(San Marino) PSG-1 Kawasaki Corse	Kawasaki	Kawasaki ZX-10R	10	(Spain) Fonsi Nieto	11–12
(San Marino) PSG-1 Kawasaki Corse	Kawasaki	Kawasaki ZX-10R	68	(Italy) Stefano Cruciani	10
(San Marino) PSG-1 Kawasaki Corse	Kawasaki	Kawasaki ZX-10R	96	(Spain) Pere Riba	8
(Austria) Klaffi Honda	Honda	Honda CBR1000RR	7	(Italy) Pierfrancesco Chili	All
(Austria) Klaffi Honda	Honda	Honda CBR1000RR	76	(Germany) Max Neukirchner	All
(Italy) Kawasaki Bertocchi	Kawasaki	Kawasaki ZX-10R	8	(Italy) Ivan Clementi	1–4
(Italy) Kawasaki Bertocchi	Kawasaki	Kawasaki ZX-10R	200	(Italy) Giovanni Bussei	All
(Italy) Team Pedercini	Ducati	Ducati 999RS	8	(Italy) Ivan Clementi	5–12
(Italy) Team Pedercini	Ducati	Ducati 999RS	19	(Italy) Lucio Pedercini	1–4, 6, 9–11
(Italy) Team Pedercini	Ducati	Ducati 999RS	25	(Italy) Alessio Velini	1, 3–12
(Italy) Team Pedercini	Ducati	Ducati 999RS	27	(Italy) Alessio Corradi	2
(Italy) Ducati SC Caracchi	Ducati	Ducati 999RS	10	(Spain) Fonsi Nieto	1–8
(Italy) Ducati SC Caracchi	Ducati	Ducati 999RS	57	(Italy) Lorenzo Lanzi	1–3, 5–9, 11–12
(Italy) Ducati SC Caracchi	Ducati	Ducati 999RS	69	(Italy) Gianluca Nannelli	4
(Italy) Ducati SC Caracchi	Ducati	Ducati 999RS	73	(Italy) Giuseppe Zannini	11–12
(Italy) Ducati SC Caracchi	Ducati	Ducati 999RS	75	(Italy) Norino Brignola	10
(Italy) Ducati SC Caracchi	Ducati	Ducati 999RS	97	(Italy) Luca Pedersoli	6
(Belgium) Alstare Suzuki Corona Extra	Suzuki	Suzuki GSX-R1000 K5	11	(Australia) Troy Corser	All
(Belgium) Alstare Suzuki Corona Extra	Suzuki	Suzuki GSX-R1000 K5	71	(Japan) Yukio Kagayama	All
(Italy) D.F.X. Treme	Yamaha	Yamaha YZF-R1	12	(Italy) Lorenzo Alfonsi	2–9
(Italy) D.F.X. Treme	Yamaha	Yamaha YZF-R1	22	(Spain) Iván Silva	11
(Italy) D.F.X. Treme	Yamaha	Yamaha YZF-R1	30	(Spain) José Luis Cardoso	2–10
(Italy) D.F.X. Treme	Yamaha	Yamaha YZF-R1	37	(Italy) Mauro Lucchiari	11
(Italy) DFXtreme Sterilgarda	Yamaha	Yamaha YZF-R1	17	(Portugal) Miguel Praia	1–10
(Italy) DFXtreme Sterilgarda	Yamaha	Yamaha YZF-R1	30	(Spain) José Luis Cardoso	1
(Italy) DFXtreme Sterilgarda	Yamaha	Yamaha YZF-R1	40	(France) Julien Da Costa	12
(Italy) DFXtreme Sterilgarda	Yamaha	Yamaha YZF-R1	20	(Italy) Marco Borciani	1–4
(Italy) DFXtreme Sterilgarda	Ducati	Ducati 999RS	20	(Italy) Marco Borciani	6–12
Zone Rouge	Yamaha	Yamaha YZF-R1	21	(Belgium) Michel Nickmans	3–12
(Czech Republic) SBK Team JM	Ducati	Ducati 999RS	23	(Czech Republic) Jiří Mrkývka	7, 9–11
(Malaysia) Foggy Petronas Racing	Petronas	Petronas FP1	24	(Australia) Garry McCoy	1–11
(Malaysia) Foggy Petronas Racing	Petronas	Petronas FP1	38	(United Kingdom) Andy Notman	12
(Malaysia) Foggy Petronas Racing	Petronas	Petronas FP1	99	(Australia) Steve Martin	All
(Netherlands) Winston Ten Kate Honda	Honda	Honda CBR1000RR	31	(Australia) Karl Muggeridge	All
(Netherlands) Winston Ten Kate Honda	Honda	Honda CBR1000RR	77	(Australia) Chris Vermeulen	All
(Italy) Yamaha Motor Italia WSB	Yamaha	Yamaha YZF-R1	41	(Japan) Noriyuki Haga	All
(Italy) Yamaha Motor Italia WSB	Yamaha	Yamaha YZF-R1	88	(Australia) Andrew Pitt	All
(Italy) Italia Lorenzini by Leoni	Yamaha	Yamaha YZF-R1	45	(Italy) Gianluca Vizziello	1–4, 6–12
(Italy) Italia Lorenzini by Leoni	Yamaha	Yamaha YZF-R1	52	(Italy) Massimo Roccoli	5
Renegade Koji	Honda	Honda CBR1000RR	155	(United States) Ben Bostrom	All
(Spain) La Glisse	Yamaha	Yamaha YZF-R1	22	(Spain) Iván Silva	1, 3
(Spain) La Glisse	Yamaha	Yamaha YZF-R1	95	(Qatar) Talal Al Nuami	1
Superbike New Zealand	Suzuki	Suzuki GSX-R1000 K4	93	(New Zealand) Andrew Stroud	2
Reynolds Motorrad	Suzuki	Suzuki GSX-R1000	16	(Spain) Sergio Fuertes	3
Folch Endurance	Yamaha	Yamaha YZF-R1	67	(Spain) Bernat Martínez	3
(France) Yamaha GMT 94	Yamaha	Yamaha YZF-R1	94	(Spain) David Checa	3, 7, 12
(Italy) Mazzali Racing	MV Agusta	MV Agusta F4 1000 MT	26	(Italy) Andrea Mazzali	4, 11
(Italy) Guandalini	Ducati	Ducati 999RS	92	(Italy) Luca Conforti	4, 6
(Italy) Guandalini	Ducati	Ducati 999RS	75	(Italy) Norino Brignola	6
(Italy) Penta Race	Ducati	Ducati 999RS	97	(Italy) Luca Pedersoli	4
Tienne	Yamaha	Yamaha YZF-R1	113	(Italy) Paolo Blora	4
(Italy) Piazza Corse	Ducati	Ducati 998RS	113	(Italy) Paolo Blora	6
(Italy) GallinaTeam	MV Agusta	MV Agusta F4 1000 MT	72	(Italy) Michele Gallina	6
(Italy) Team Giesse	Yamaha	Yamaha YZF-R1	73	(Italy) Giuseppe Zannini	6
Poland Position	Suzuki	Suzuki GSX-R1000	74	(Poland) Adam Badziak	6–7, 12
(Czech Republic) JTR Ducati Corse	Ducati	Ducati 999RS	59	(Czech Republic) Jiří Trčka	7
Maco Moto Racing	Yamaha	Yamaha YZF-R1	79	(Slovakia) Jiří Dražďák	7
Maco Moto Racing	Yamaha	Yamaha YZF-R1	80	(Slovakia) Marek Svoboda	7
(Czech Republic) Prorace Team	Suzuki	Suzuki GSX-R1000 K5	81	(Czech Republic) Miloš Čihák	7
(United Kingdom) Team Nvidia	Yamaha	Yamaha YZF-R1	98	(United Kingdom) Dennis Hobbs	8
(United Kingdom) Rizla Suzuki	Suzuki	Suzuki GSX-R1000 K5	33	(Netherlands) Jurgen van den Goorbergh	9
Yamaha GS Racing	Yamaha	Yamaha YZF-R1	82	(Netherlands) Bob Withag	9
Yamaha GS Racing	Yamaha	Yamaha YZF-R1	83	(Netherlands) Paul Mooijman	9
(Netherlands) Racing Team Robert Menzen	Suzuki	Suzuki GSX-R1000 K5	85	(Netherlands) Robert Menzen	9
Trac Racing Team	Suzuki	Suzuki GSX-R1000 K5	86	(Netherlands) Bertus Folkertsma	9
Alpha Technik Van Zon Honda	Honda	Honda CBR1000RR	14	(Germany) Ralf Waldmann	10
Alpha Technik Van Zon Honda	Honda	Honda CBR1000RR	15	(Germany) Michael Schulten	10
(Italy) Emmebi Team	Honda	Honda CBR1000RR	35	(Italy) Luca Pini	11
(Italy) PapaMoto Sport	Kawasaki	Kawasaki ZX-10R	36	(Italy) Maurizio Prattichizzo	11
(France) Motorsport Courneuvien 93	Kawasaki	Kawasaki ZX-10R	60	(France) Laurent Brian	12
Suzuki Castrol Team	Suzuki	Suzuki GSX-R1000 K5	62	(France) Vincent Philippe	12

Key
Regular rider
Wildcard rider
Replacement rider

- All entries used Pirelli tyres.
