= 2005 Losail Superbike World Championship round =

(Qatar) 2005 Losail Superbike World Championship round
Round details
- Round 1 of 12 rounds in the 2005 Superbike World Championship. and Round 1 of 12 rounds in the 2005 Supersport World Championship.
- Date: February 26, 2005
- Location: Losail Circuit
- Course: Permanent racing facility 5.380 km (3.343 mi)

Superbike World Championship
Pole position
(France) Régis Laconi
2:01.593
Fastest lap race 1	Fastest lap race 2
(Japan) Yukio Kagayama	(France) Sébastien Gimbert
2:02.135	2:01.852

Supersport World Championship
Pole position
(France) Sébastien Charpentier
2:03.841
Fastest lap
(France) Sébastien Charpentier
2:04.686

The 2005 Losail Superbike World Championship round was the first round of the 2005 Superbike World Championship. It took place on the weekend of February 24–26, 2005 at the Losail International Circuit in Qatar.

== Results ==
=== Superbike race 1 classification ===
Pos.	No.	Rider	Bike	Laps	Time	Grid	Points
1	11	(Australia) Troy Corser	Suzuki GSX-R1000 K5	18	37:10.394	2	25
2	71	(Japan) Yukio Kagayama	Suzuki GSX-R1000 K5	18	+3.065	4	20
3	55	(France) Régis Laconi	Ducati 999 F05	18	+3.496	1	16
4	88	(Australia) Andrew Pitt	Yamaha YZF R1	18	+14.714	5	13
5	41	(Japan) Noriyuki Haga	Yamaha YZF R1	18	+20.300	7	11
6	1	(United Kingdom) James Toseland	Ducati 999 F05	18	+20.562	13	10
7	22	(Spain) Iván Silva	Yamaha YZF R1	18	+22.031	9	9
8	77	(Australia) Chris Vermeulen	Honda CBR1000RR	18	+22.188	8	8
9	31	(Australia) Karl Muggeridge	Honda CBR1000RR	18	+26.929	18	7
10	3	(Japan) Norifumi Abe	Yamaha YZF R1	18	+27.231	15	6
11	200	(Italy) Giovanni Bussei	Kawasaki ZX 10	18	+38.995	12	5
12	20	(Italy) Marco Borciani	Yamaha YZF R1	18	+42.208	16	4
13	10	(Spain) Fonsi Nieto	Ducati 999 RS	18	+43.494	19	3
14	9	(United Kingdom) Chris Walker	Kawasaki ZX 10	18	+44.894	11	2
15	99	(Australia) Steve Martin	Petronas FP1	18	+49.673	20	1
16	155	(United States) Ben Bostrom	Honda CBR1000RR	18	+53.884	28	
17	24	(Australia) Garry McCoy	Petronas FP1	18	+1:01.558	25	
18	6	(Italy) Mauro Sanchini	Kawasaki ZX 10	18	+1:04.028	24	
19	45	(Italy) Gianluca Vizziello	Yamaha YZF R1	18	+1:05.885	21	
20	17	(Portugal) Miguel Praia	Yamaha YZF R1	18	+1:27.742	22	
Ret	32	(France) Sébastien Gimbert	Yamaha YZF R1	13	Retirement	3	
Ret	57	(Italy) Lorenzo Lanzi	Ducati 999 RS	13	Retirement	17	
Ret	76	(Germany) Max Neukirchner	Honda CBR1000RR	13	Retirement	14	
Ret	25	(Italy) Alessio Velini	Ducati 999 RS	8	Retirement	27	
Ret	8	(Italy) Ivan Clementi	Kawasaki ZX 10	6	Retirement	23	
Ret	19	(Italy) Lucio Pedercini	Ducati 999 RS	3	Retirement	26	
Ret	95	(Qatar) Talal Al Nuami	Yamaha YZF R1	2	Retirement	29	
Ret	7	(Italy) Pierfrancesco Chili	Honda CBR1000RR	0	Retirement	10	
Ret	30	(Spain) José Luis Cardoso	Yamaha YZF R1	0	Retirement	6	

=== Superbike race 2 classification ===
Pos.	No.	Rider	Bike	Laps	Time	Grid	Points
1	71	(Japan) Yukio Kagayama	Suzuki GSX-R1000 K5	18	37:00.062	4	25
2	55	(France) Régis Laconi	Ducati 999 F05	18	+2.454	1	20
3	11	(Australia) Troy Corser	Suzuki GSX-R1000 K5	18	+5.959	2	16
4	77	(Australia) Chris Vermeulen	Honda CBR1000RR	18	+7.245	8	13
5	7	(Italy) Pierfrancesco Chili	Honda CBR1000RR	18	+8.600	10	11
6	1	(United Kingdom) James Toseland	Ducati 999 F05	18	+8.601	13	10
7	3	(Japan) Norifumi Abe	Yamaha YZF R1	18	+9.731	15	9
8	76	(Germany) Max Neukirchner	Honda CBR1000RR	18	+11.501	14	8
9	88	(Australia) Andrew Pitt	Yamaha YZF R1	18	+11.790	5	7
10	32	(France) Sébastien Gimbert	Yamaha YZF R1	18	+11.808	3	6
11	41	(Japan) Noriyuki Haga	Yamaha YZF R1	18	+21.364	7	5
12	57	(Italy) Lorenzo Lanzi	Ducati 999 RS	18	+25.875	17	4
13	10	(Spain) Fonsi Nieto	Ducati 999 RS	18	+34.084	19	3
14	200	(Italy) Giovanni Bussei	Kawasaki ZX 10	18	+34.119	12	2
15	6	(Italy) Mauro Sanchini	Kawasaki ZX 10	18	+47.446	24	1
16	24	(Australia) Garry McCoy	Petronas FP1	18	+48.647	25	
17	45	(Italy) Gianluca Vizziello	Yamaha YZF R1	18	+1:03.995	21	
18	17	(Portugal) Miguel Praia	Yamaha YZF R1	18	+1:05.222	22	
Ret	99	(Australia) Steve Martin	Petronas FP1	16	Retirement	20	
Ret	20	(Italy) Marco Borciani	Yamaha YZF R1	12	Retirement	16	
Ret	95	(Qatar) Talal Al Nuami	Yamaha YZF R1	10	Retirement	29	
Ret	9	(United Kingdom) Chris Walker	Kawasaki ZX 10	9	Retirement	11	
Ret	31	(Australia) Karl Muggeridge	Honda CBR1000RR	9	Retirement	18	
Ret	22	(Spain) Iván Silva	Yamaha YZF R1	6	Retirement	9	
Ret	8	(Italy) Ivan Clementi	Kawasaki ZX 10	5	Retirement	23	
Ret	25	(Italy) Alessio Velini	Ducati 999 RS	3	Retirement	27	
Ret	19	(Italy) Lucio Pedercini	Ducati 999 RS	2	Retirement	26	
Ret	155	(United States) Ben Bostrom	Honda CBR1000RR	0	Retirement	28	
Ret	30	(Spain) José Luis Cardoso	Yamaha YZF R1	0	Retirement	6	

=== Supersport race classification ===
Pos.	No.	Rider	Bike	Laps	Time	Grid	Points
1	21	(Japan) Katsuaki Fujiwara	Honda CBR600RR	18	37:54.414	2	25
2	16	(France) Sébastien Charpentier	Honda CBR600RR	18	+5.462	1	20
3	84	(Italy) Michel Fabrizio	Honda CBR600RR	18	+13.970	3	16
4	11	(Australia) Kevin Curtain	Yamaha YZF-R6	18	+28.713	5	13
5	99	(France) Fabien Foret	Honda CBR600RR	18	+31.316	4	11
6	23	(Australia) Broc Parkes	Yamaha YZF-R6	18	+32.459	7	10
7	8	(France) Stéphane Chambon	Honda CBR600RR	18	+36.842	8	9
8	12	(Spain) Javier Forés	Suzuki GSX 600R	18	+42.491	9	8
9	69	(Italy) Gianluca Nannelli	Ducati 749 R	18	+54.930	10	7
10	25	(Finland) Tatu Lauslehto	Honda CBR600RR	18	+59.092	11	6
11	14	(Italy) Andrea Berta	Ducati 749 R	18	+1:31.728	17	5
12	58	(Czech Republic) Tomáš Mikšovský	Honda CBR600RR	18	+1:36.071	16	4
13	59	(Poland) Paweł Szkopek	Honda CBR600RR	18	+1:47.590	14	3
14	15	(Italy) Matteo Baiocco	Kawasaki ZX 6RR	17	+1 lap	18	2
Ret	24	(France) Christophe Cogan	Suzuki GSX 600R	14	Retirement	6	
Ret	30	(Italy) Alessandro Antonello	Kawasaki ZX 6RR	10	Retirement	12	
Ret	48	(Spain) David García	Kawasaki ZX 6RR	9	Retirement	13	
Ret	3	(Netherlands) Jurgen van den Goorbergh	Ducati 749 R	8	Retirement	15	
