= Brands Hatch Superbike World Championship round =

Brands Hatch Superbike World Championship round may refer to:

- 2006 Brands Hatch Superbike World Championship round
- 2007 Brands Hatch Superbike World Championship round
- 2008 Brands Hatch Superbike World Championship round

== See also ==
- Brands Hatch
