= 2006 Brno Superbike World Championship round =

(Czech Republic) 2006 Brno Superbike World Championship round
Round details
- Round 7 of 12 rounds in the 2006 Superbike World Championship. and Round 7 of 12 rounds in the 2006 Supersport World Championship.
- Date: July 23, 2006
- Location: Masaryk Circuit
- Course: Permanent racing facility 5.403 km (3.357 mi)

Superbike World Championship
Pole position
(Japan) Noriyuki Haga
2:00.457
| Fastest lap race 1 | Fastest lap race 2 |
| (Japan) Yukio Kagayama | (Japan) Noriyuki Haga |
| 2:02.606 | 2:02.594 |

Supersport World Championship
Pole position
(Australia) Kevin Curtain
2:05.900
Fastest lap
(France) Yoann Tiberio
2:06.604

The 2006 Brno Superbike World Championship round was the seventh round of the 2006 Superbike World Championship. It took place on the weekend of July 21–23, 2006 at the Masaryk Circuit located in Brno.

== Results ==
=== Superbike race 1 classification ===
| Pos | No | Rider | Bike | Laps | Time | Grid | Points |
|---|---|---|---|---|---|---|---|
| 1 | 71 | (Japan) Yukio Kagayama | Suzuki GSX-R1000 K6 | 20 | 41:27.271 | 6 | 25 |
| 2 | 52 | (United Kingdom) James Toseland | Honda CBR1000RR | 20 | +3.900 | 2 | 20 |
| 3 | 84 | (Italy) Michel Fabrizio | Honda CBR1000RR | 20 | +6.255 | 12 | 16 |
| 4 | 41 | (Japan) Noriyuki Haga | Yamaha YZF R1 | 20 | +6.432 | 1 | 13 |
| 5 | 1 | (Australia) Troy Corser | Suzuki GSX-R1000 K6 | 20 | +7.463 | 5 | 11 |
| 6 | 10 | (Spain) Fonsi Nieto | Kawasaki ZX 10R | 20 | +21.967 | 10 | 10 |
| 7 | 9 | (United Kingdom) Chris Walker | Kawasaki ZX 10R | 20 | +21.989 | 13 | 9 |
| 8 | 38 | (Japan) Shinichi Nakatomi | Yamaha YZF R1 | 20 | +26.882 | 19 | 8 |
| 9 | 3 | (Japan) Norifumi Abe | Yamaha YZF R1 | 20 | +27.174 | 20 | 7 |
| 10 | 7 | (Italy) Pierfrancesco Chili | Honda CBR1000RR | 20 | +27.441 | 16 | 6 |
| 11 | 31 | (Australia) Karl Muggeridge | Honda CBR1000RR | 20 | +28.299 | 8 | 5 |
| 12 | 44 | (Italy) Roberto Rolfo | Ducati 999 F05 | 20 | +32.112 | 21 | 4 |
| 13 | 16 | (France) Sebastien Gimbert | Yamaha YZF R1 | 20 | +36.427 | 17 | 3 |
| 14 | 13 | (Italy) Vittorio Iannuzzo | Suzuki GSX-R1000 K6 | 20 | +44.249 | 24 | 2 |
| 15 | 8 | (Italy) Ivan Clementi | Ducati 999 RS | 20 | +1:00.978 | 22 | 1 |
| 16 | 20 | (Italy) Marco Borciani | Ducati 999 F05 | 20 | +1:05.300 | 23 | |
| 17 | 18 | (United Kingdom) Craig Jones | Petronas FP1 | 20 | +1:05.914 | 27 | |
| 18 | 25 | (Australia) Josh Brookes | Kawasaki ZX 10R | 20 | +1:07.582 | 25 | |
| 19 | 91 | (Poland) Paweł Szkopek | Ducati 999 RS | 20 | +1:31.323 | 26 | |
| 20 | 36 | (Czech Republic) Jiří Dražďák | Yamaha YZF R1 | 20 | +1:31.485 | 28 | |
| 21 | 39 | (Slovenia) Berto Camlek | Yamaha YZF R1 | 19 | +1 Lap | 31 | |
| Ret | 88 | (Australia) Andrew Pitt | Yamaha YZF R1 | 19 | Retirement | 7 | |
| Ret | 57 | (Italy) Lorenzo Lanzi | Ducati 999 F06 | 19 | Retirement | 3 | |
| Ret | 4 | (Brazil) Alex Barros | Honda CBR1000RR | 8 | Retirement | 15 | |
| Ret | 11 | (Spain) Ruben Xaus | Ducati 999 F05 | 7 | Retirement | 18 | |
| Ret | 15 | (France) Fabien Foret | Suzuki GSX-R1000 K6 | 5 | Retirement | 11 | |
| Ret | 99 | (Australia) Steve Martin | Petronas FP1 | 3 | Retirement | 14 | |
| Ret | 23 | (Czech Republic) Jiří Mrkývka | Ducati 999 RS | 1 | Retirement | 32 | |
| Ret | 22 | (Czech Republic) Miloš Čihák | Suzuki GSX-R1000 K6 | 0 | Retirement | 30 | |
| Ret | 55 | (France) Regis Laconi | Kawasaki ZX 10R | 0 | Retirement | 9 | |
| Ret | 21 | (Australia) Troy Bayliss | Ducati 999 F06 | 0 | Retirement | 4 | |

=== Superbike race 2 classification ===
| Pos | No | Rider | Bike | Laps | Time | Grid | Points |
|---|---|---|---|---|---|---|---|
| 1 | 71 | (Japan) Yukio Kagayama | Suzuki GSX-R1000 K6 | 20 | 41:31.118 | 6 | 25 |
| 2 | 84 | (Italy) Michel Fabrizio | Honda CBR1000RR | 20 | +2.431 | 12 | 20 |
| 3 | 41 | (Japan) Noriyuki Haga | Yamaha YZF R1 | 20 | +2.479 | 1 | 16 |
| 4 | 1 | (Australia) Troy Corser | Suzuki GSX-R1000 K6 | 20 | +2.514 | 5 | 13 |
| 5 | 52 | (United Kingdom) James Toseland | Honda CBR1000RR | 20 | +4.939 | 2 | 11 |
| 6 | 10 | (Spain) Fonsi Nieto | Kawasaki ZX 10R | 20 | +5.070 | 10 | 10 |
| 7 | 31 | (Australia) Karl Muggeridge | Honda CBR1000RR | 20 | +7.932 | 8 | 9 |
| 8 | 21 | (Australia) Troy Bayliss | Ducati 999 F06 | 20 | +15.441 | 4 | 8 |
| 9 | 57 | (Italy) Lorenzo Lanzi | Ducati 999 F06 | 20 | +15.755 | 3 | 7 |
| 10 | 9 | (United Kingdom) Chris Walker | Kawasaki ZX 10R | 20 | +17.461 | 13 | 6 |
| 11 | 4 | (Brazil) Alex Barros | Honda CBR1000RR | 20 | +21.547 | 15 | 5 |
| 12 | 3 | (Japan) Norifumi Abe | Yamaha YZF R1 | 20 | +22.052 | 20 | 4 |
| 13 | 38 | (Japan) Shinichi Nakatomi | Yamaha YZF R1 | 20 | +22.102 | 19 | 3 |
| 14 | 11 | (Spain) Ruben Xaus | Ducati 999 F05 | 20 | +26.983 | 18 | 2 |
| 15 | 16 | (France) Sebastien Gimbert | Yamaha YZF R1 | 20 | +29.549 | 17 | 1 |
| 16 | 55 | (France) Regis Laconi | Kawasaki ZX 10R | 20 | +32.056 | 9 | |
| 17 | 44 | (Italy) Roberto Rolfo | Ducati 999 F05 | 20 | +37.287 | 21 | |
| 18 | 13 | (Italy) Vittorio Iannuzzo | Suzuki GSX-R1000 K6 | 20 | +39.376 | 24 | |
| 19 | 99 | (Australia) Steve Martin | Petronas FP1 | 20 | +44.031 | 14 | |
| 20 | 15 | (France) Fabien Foret | Suzuki GSX-R1000 K6 | 20 | +47.369 | 11 | |
| 21 | 18 | (United Kingdom) Craig Jones | Petronas FP1 | 20 | +47.742 | 27 | |
| 22 | 36 | (Czech Republic) Jiří Dražďák | Yamaha YZF R1 | 20 | +1:10.029 | 28 | |
| 23 | 39 | (Slovenia) Berto Camlek | Yamaha YZF R1 | 20 | +1:42.455 | 31 | |
| Ret | 22 | (Czech Republic) Miloš Čihák | Suzuki GSX-R1000 K6 | 19 | Retirement | 30 | |
| Ret | 88 | (Australia) Andrew Pitt | Yamaha YZF R1 | 16 | Retirement | 7 | |
| Ret | 25 | (Australia) Josh Brookes | Kawasaki ZX 10R | 15 | Retirement | 25 | |
| Ret | 91 | (Poland) Paweł Szkopek | Ducati 999 RS | 10 | Retirement | 26 | |
| Ret | 7 | (Italy) Pierfrancesco Chili | Honda CBR1000RR | 8 | Retirement | 16 | |
| Ret | 8 | (Italy) Ivan Clementi | Ducati 999 RS | 7 | Retirement | 22 | |
| Ret | 20 | (Italy) Marco Borciani | Ducati 999 F05 | 5 | Retirement | 23 | |
| Ret | 23 | (Czech Republic) Jiří Mrkývka | Ducati 999 RS | 3 | Retirement | 32 | |

=== Supersport race classification ===
| Pos | No | Rider | Bike | Laps | Time | Grid | Points |
|---|---|---|---|---|---|---|---|
| 1 | 11 | (Australia) Kevin Curtain | Yamaha YZF-R6 | 18 | 38:23.594 | 1 | |
| 2 | 23 | (Australia) Broc Parkes | Yamaha YZF-R6 | 18 | +1.535 | 3 | |
| 3 | 54 | (Turkey) Kenan Sofuoğlu | Honda CBR600RR | 18 | +3.940 | 2 | |
| 4 | 32 | (France) Yoann Tiberio | Honda CBR 600RR | 18 | +19.396 | 4 | |
| 5 | 45 | (Italy) Gianluca Vizziello | Yamaha YZF-R6 | 18 | +21.495 | 11 | |
| 6 | 116 | (Sweden) Johan Stigefelt | Honda CBR 600RR | 18 | +22.058 | 7 | |
| 7 | 6 | (Italy) Mauro Sanchini | Yamaha YZF-R6 | 18 | +24.958 | 13 | |
| 8 | 94 | (Spain) David Checa | Yamaha YZF-R6 | 18 | +25.795 | 12 | |
| 9 | 61 | (Italy) Simone Sanna | Honda CBR 600RR | 18 | +26.684 | 6 | |
| 10 | 73 | (Austria) Christian Zaiser | Ducati 749 R | 18 | +32.440 | 9 | |
| 11 | 16 | (France) Sébastien Charpentier | Honda CBR 600RR | 18 | +36.106 | 5 | |
| 12 | 12 | (Spain) Xavi Forés | Yamaha YZF-R6 | 18 | +45.429 | 21 | |
| 13 | 7 | (France) Stéphane Chambon | Kawasaki ZX6RR | 18 | +51.659 | 20 | |
| 14 | 25 | (Finland) Tatu Lauslehto | Honda CBR 600RR | 18 | +52.437 | 27 | |
| 15 | 22 | (Norway) Kai Borre Andersen | Suzuki GSX 600R | 18 | +56.566 | 15 | |
| 16 | 91 | (Spain) Javier Hidalgo | Honda CBR 600RR | 18 | +57.699 | 32 | |
| 17 | 88 | (France) Julien Enjolras | Yamaha YZF-R6 | 18 | +59.363 | 23 | |
| 18 | 27 | (United Kingdom) Tom Tunstall | Honda CBR 600RR | 18 | +1:01.689 | 35 | |
| 19 | 29 | (Czech Republic) Václav Bittman | Honda CBR 600RR | 18 | +1:02.048 | 36 | |
| 20 | 68 | (Spain) David Forner Garcia | Yamaha YZF-R6 | 18 | +1:31.782 | 38 | |
| Ret | 31 | (Finland) Mika Kallio | Yamaha YZF-R6 | 17 | Retirement | 24 | |
| Ret | 17 | (Portugal) Miguel Praia | Honda CBR 600RR | 17 | Retirement | 26 | |
| Ret | 60 | (Russia) Vladimir Ivanov | Yamaha YZF-R6 | 15 | Retirement | 28 | |
| Ret | 145 | (Belgium) Sebastien Le Grelle | Honda CBR 600RR | 12 | Retirement | 22 | |
| Ret | 55 | (Italy) Massimo Roccoli | Yamaha YZF-R6 | 6 | Retirement | 8 | |
| Ret | 77 | (Netherlands) Barry Veneman | Suzuki GSX 600R | 3 | Retirement | 10 | |
| Ret | 37 | (San Marino) William De Angelis | Honda CBR 600RR | 3 | Retirement | 17 | |
| Ret | 127 | (Denmark) Robbin Harms | Honda CBR 600RR | 3 | Retirement | 14 | |
| Ret | 18 | (France) Matthieu Lagrive | Honda CBR 600RR | 2 | Retirement | 16 | |
| Ret | 99 | (Italy) Sebastiano Zerbo | Yamaha YZF-R6 | 2 | Retirement | 34 | |
| Ret | 15 | (Italy) Andrea Berta | Yamaha YZF-R6 | 1 | Retirement | 37 | |
| Ret | 72 | (United Kingdom) Stuart Easton | Ducati 749 R | 0 | Retirement | 33 | |
| Ret | 57 | (Slovenia) Luka Nedog | Ducati 749 R | 0 | Retirement | 31 | |
| Ret | 76 | (Spain) Bernat Martinez | Yamaha YZF-R6 | 0 | Retirement | 30 | |
| Ret | 9 | (Italy) Alessio Corradi | Yamaha YZF-R6 | 0 | Retirement | 29 | |
| Ret | 5 | (Italy) Alessio Velini | Yamaha YZF-R6 | 0 | Retirement | 25 | |
| Ret | 8 | (France) Maxime Berger | Kawasaki ZX6RR | 0 | Retirement | 19 | |
| Ret | 38 | (France) Grégory Leblanc | Honda CBR 600RR | 0 | Retirement | 18 | |

== Superstock 1000 race classification ==
| Pos. | No. | Rider | Bike | Laps | Time/Retired | Grid | Points |
|---|---|---|---|---|---|---|---|
| 1 | 86 | (Italy) Ayrton Badovini | MV Agusta F4 1000 R | 7 | 15:08.344 | 12 | 25 |
| 2 | 9 | (Italy) Luca Scassa | MV Agusta F4 1000 R | 7 | +0.137 | 1 | 20 |
| 3 | 47 | (United Kingdom) Richard Cooper | Honda CBR1000RR | 7 | +6.161 | 2 | 16 |
| 4 | 15 | (Italy) Matteo Baiocco | Yamaha YZF-R1 | 7 | +11.524 | 10 | 13 |
| 5 | 12 | (Germany) Leonardo Biliotti | MV Agusta F4 1000 R | 7 | +12.269 | 9 | 11 |
| 6 | 5 | (Italy) Riccardo Chiarello | Kawasaki ZX-10R | 7 | +14.736 | 3 | 10 |
| 7 | 99 | (Italy) Danilo Dell'Omo | Suzuki GSX-R1000 K6 | 7 | +14.819 | 13 | 9 |
| 8 | 8 | (France) Loïc Napoleone | Suzuki GSX-R1000 K6 | 7 | +15.935 | 8 | 8 |
| 9 | 11 | (Italy) Denis Sacchetti | Kawasaki ZX-10R | 7 | +15.975 | 6 | 7 |
| 10 | 16 | (Spain) Enrique Rocamora | Yamaha YZF-R1 | 7 | +16.267 | 21 | 6 |
| 11 | 17 | (France) Cédric Tangre | Suzuki GSX-R1000 K6 | 7 | +16.578 | 7 | 5 |
| 12 | 24 | (Slovenia) Marko Jerman | Suzuki GSX-R1000 K6 | 7 | +16.698 | 37 | 4 |
| 13 | 32 | (South Africa) Sheridan Morais | Suzuki GSX-R1000 K6 | 7 | +17.505 | 22 | 3 |
| 14 | 77 | (Italy) Claudio Corti | Yamaha YZF-R1 | 7 | +17.607 | 24 | 2 |
| 15 | 42 | (Spain) Alex Martinez | Suzuki GSX-R1000 K6 | 7 | +21.125 | 16 | 1 |
| 16 | 57 | (Italy) Ilario Dionisi | MV Agusta F4 1000 R | 7 | +21.988 | 23 | |
| 17 | 21 | (Netherlands) Leon Bovee | Suzuki GSX-R1000 K6 | 7 | +22.539 | 27 | |
| 18 | 43 | (Poland) Bartlomiej Wiczynski | Suzuki GSX-R1000 K6 | 7 | +25.923 | 30 | |
| 19 | 28 | (Belgium) Sepp Vermonden | Suzuki GSX-R1000 K6 | 7 | +26.093 | 33 | |
| 20 | 90 | (Italy) Diego Ciavattini | Yamaha YZF-R1 | 7 | +27.754 | 34 | |
| 21 | 35 | (Netherlands) Allard Kerkhoven | Suzuki GSX-R1000 K6 | 7 | +28.987 | 36 | |
| 22 | 18 | (Belgium) Eric Van Bael | Suzuki GSX-R1000 K6 | 7 | +39.610 | 15 | |
| 23 | 31 | (Italy) Giuseppe Barone | Suzuki GSX-R1000 K6 | 7 | +40.332 | 25 | |
| 24 | 14 | (Italy) Mauro Belliero | Honda CBR1000RR | 7 | +44.225 | 19 | |
| 25 | 34 | (Republic of Ireland) Mark Pollock | Suzuki GSX-R1000 K6 | 7 | +1:30.932 | 31 | |
| Ret | 73 | (Italy) Simone Saltarelli | Kawasaki ZX-10R | 6 | Accident | 29 | |
| Ret | 44 | (Italy) Roberto Lunadei | Yamaha YZF-R1 | 5 | Retirement | 18 | |
| Ret | 53 | (Italy) Alessandro Polita | Kawasaki ZX-10R | 3 | Accident | 11 | |
| Ret | 38 | (Italy) Gilles Boccolini | Kawasaki ZX-10R | 3 | Accident | 5 | |
| Ret | 55 | (Belgium) Olivier Depoorter | Yamaha YZF-R1 | 2 | Technical problem | 14 | |
| Ret | 154 | (Italy) Tommaso Lorenzetti | Honda CBR1000RR | 2 | Retirement | 26 | |
| Ret | 96 | (Czech Republic) Matěj Smrž | Honda CBR1000RR | 1 | Accident | 4 | |
| Ret | 41 | (Australia) Nick Henderson | Suzuki GSX-R1000 K6 | 1 | Accident | 17 | |
| Ret | 10 | (Italy) Giuseppe Natalini | Yamaha YZF-R1 | 0 | Technical problem | 28 | |
| Ret | 82 | (Italy) Giuseppe Cedroni | Honda CBR1000RR | 0 | Technical problem | 20 | |
| DNS | 71 | (Norway) Petter Solli | Yamaha YZF-R1 | 0 | Did not start | 32 | |
| DNS | 89 | (Switzerland) Raphael Chevre | Suzuki GSX-R1000 K6 | 0 | Did not start | 35 | |

== Superstock 600 race classification ==
| Pos. | No. | Rider | Bike | Laps | Time/Retired | Grid | Points |
|---|---|---|---|---|---|---|---|
| 1 | 19 | (Belgium) Xavier Simeon | Suzuki GSX-R600 | 10 | 22:16.277 | 1 | 25 |
| 2 | 59 | (Italy) Niccolò Canepa | Ducati 749R | 10 | +0.484 | 2 | 20 |
| 3 | 8 | (Italy) Andrea Antonelli | Honda CBR600RR | 10 | +8.605 | 5 | 16 |
| 4 | 69 | (Czech Republic) Ondřej Ježek | Kawasaki ZX-6R | 10 | +8.872 | 3 | 13 |
| 5 | 37 | (Poland) Andrzej Chmielewski | Yamaha YZF-R6 | 10 | +11.154 | 4 | 11 |
| 6 | 24 | (Italy) Daniele Beretta | Suzuki GSX-R600 | 10 | +12.228 | 11 | 10 |
| 7 | 89 | (Italy) Domenico Colucci | Ducati 749R | 10 | +13.227 | 16 | 9 |
| 8 | 56 | (Switzerland) Daniel Sutter | Honda CBR600RR | 10 | +20.800 | 19 | 8 |
| 9 | 77 | (United Kingdom) Barry Burrell | Honda CBR600RR | 10 | +22.878 | 18 | 7 |
| 10 | 30 | (Switzerland) Michaël Savary | Yamaha YZF-R6 | 10 | +24.438 | 14 | 6 |
| 11 | 21 | (France) Franck Millet | Yamaha YZF-R6 | 10 | +32.603 | 23 | 5 |
| 12 | 99 | (Netherlands) Roy Ten Napel | Yamaha YZF-R6 | 10 | +33.439 | 7 | 4 |
| 13 | 31 | (Netherlands) Lennart Van Houwelingen | Suzuki GSX-R600 | 10 | +34.485 | 24 | 3 |
| 14 | 29 | (Sweden) Filip Backlund | Suzuki GSX-R600 | 10 | +35.699 | 26 | 2 |
| 15 | 26 | (United States) Will Gruy | Yamaha YZF-R6 | 10 | +39.372 | 25 | 1 |
| 16 | 88 | (Norway) Mads Odin Hodt | Yamaha YZF-R6 | 10 | +39.860 | 29 | |
| 17 | 74 | (France) Sylvain Barrier | Yamaha YZF-R6 | 10 | +41.524 | 9 | |
| 18 | 84 | (Slovenia) Boštjan Pintar | Yamaha YZF-R6 | 10 | +47.254 | 21 | |
| 19 | 16 | (United Kingdom) Christopher Northover | Suzuki GSX-R600 | 10 | +47.327 | 35 | |
| 20 | 44 | (Italy) Cristiano Erbacci | Yamaha YZF-R6 | 10 | +48.990 | 22 | |
| 21 | 20 | (Czech Republic) Jan Prudik | Honda CBR600RR | 10 | +50.962 | 31 | |
| 22 | 199 | (United Kingdom) Gregg Black | Honda CBR600RR | 10 | +51.797 | 20 | |
| 23 | 58 | (Switzerland) Gabriel Berclaz | Yamaha YZF-R6 | 10 | +52.586 | 32 | |
| 24 | 25 | (Czech Republic) Patrik Vostárek | Honda CBR600RR | 10 | +52.598 | 27 | |
| 25 | 32 | (Italy) Robert Gianfardoni | Suzuki GSX-R600 | 10 | +55.342 | 34 | |
| 26 | 28 | (Spain) Yannick Guerra | Yamaha YZF-R6 | 10 | +55.431 | 33 | |
| 27 | 18 | (United Kingdom) Matt Bond | Suzuki GSX-R600 | 10 | +1:04.691 | 28 | |
| Ret | 7 | (Italy) Renato Costantini | Honda CBR600RR | 9 | Accident | 6 | |
| Ret | 10 | (Italy) Davide Giugliano | Kawasaki ZX-6R | 9 | Accident | 10 | |
| Ret | 33 | (Italy) Alessandro Colatosti | Kawasaki ZX-6R | 9 | Technical problem | 17 | |
| Ret | 12 | (Italy) Davide Caldart | Kawasaki ZX-6R | 6 | Retirement | 36 | |
| DSQ | 55 | (Belgium) Vincent Lonbois | Suzuki GSX-R600 | 3 | Disqualified | 30 | |
| Ret | 47 | (Italy) Eddi La Marra | Yamaha YZF-R6 | 2 | Accident | 12 | |
| DNS | 79 | (Brazil) Luiz Carlos | Yamaha YZF-R6 | 0 | Did not start | 15 | |
| DNS | 34 | (Sweden) Alexander Lundh | Honda CBR600RR | 0 | Did not start | 8 | |
| DNS | 41 | (Switzerland) Gregory Junod | Suzuki GSX-R600 | 0 | Did not start | 13 | |
