= Marco Borciani =

Italian motorcycle racer (born 1975)

- Nationality: Italian
- Born: 7 December 1975 (age 50); Desenzano del Garda, Province of Brescia, Lombardy, Italy
- Website: www.marcoborciani.com
Motorcycle racing career statistics
125cc World Championship
Active years	1997
Manufacturers	Honda
Championships	0
1997 championship position	NC (0 pts)
Starts / Wins / Podiums / Poles / F. laps / Points; 1 / 0 / 0 / 0 / 0 / 0
Superbike World Championship
Active years	2000–2007
Manufacturers	Ducati, Yamaha
Championships	0
2007 championship position	20th (12 pts)
Starts / Wins / Podiums / Poles / F. laps / Points; 163 / 0 / 0 / 0 / 0 / 347
Supersport World Championship
Active years	1999
Manufacturers	Honda CBR600F4
Championships	0
1999 championship position	47th (1 pt)
Starts / Wins / Podiums / Poles / F. laps / Points; 5 / 0 / 0 / 0 / 0 / 1

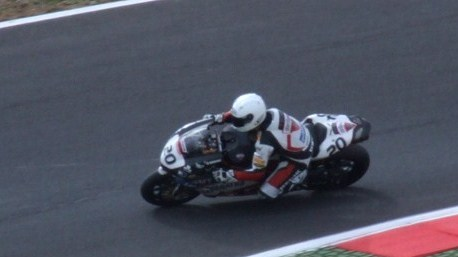
Marco Borciani rides the Team Sterilgarda Ducati 999 F06 at Round 14 of the WSBK, held at Vallelunga, October 2007

Marco Borciani (born 7 December 1975 in Desenzano del Garda) is an Italian retired motorcycle racer, now motorcycle racing team owner and manager.

== Career ==
Borciani started racing in the Italian Sport Production Championship, gaining eighth place in 1994, and fourth in 1995. He then moved to the Italian Honda GP 125 championship in 1996, while still continuing with rounds of the Sport Production series.

In 1997, Borciani debuted in the European 125cc Championship, and took part in the final round of the 125 cc World Championship. Throughout the 1998 season he competed for the European 125 cc title against Marco Melandri, but after an accident and resultant damage to his hand, his season ended early with three rounds to complete.

In 1999, Borciani raced in the World Supersport Championship, competing on a Honda CBR600F4, gaining a single point at the Nürburgring.

From 2000 to 2007, Borciani competed in the Superbike World Championship:

- 2000: Team Pedercini, Ducati 996RS, 46th
- 2001: Team Pedercini, Ducati 996RS, 27th
- 2002: Team Pedercini, Ducati 998RS, 15th
- 2003: Team DFXtreme, Ducati 998RS, 10th
- 2004: Team DFXtreme/Sterilgarda, Ducati 998RS, 10th
- 2005: Team DFXtreme/Sterilgarda, Yamaha YZF-R1/Ducati 999RS, 27th
- 2006: Team Sterilgarda-Berik, Ducati 999 F05, 25th
- 2007: Team Sterilgarda, Ducati 999 F06, 20th

From the 2003 season, Borciani also raced in part of the Italian-national CIV Superbike championship, coming tenth in both 2003 and 2004. He returned to CIV Superbike from the 2006 season, joining the works Ducati team for two seasons.

=== BRC Racing ===
In the 2005 season, Borciani had started his own BRC Racing team, managing other riders competing in series from junior Italian-based series, through WSBK and Superstock.

Having been released from the CIV Superbike Ducati-works team, Borciani raced his own privateer Ducati in the 2008 series coming eighth, and the 2009 series, coming fourth.

- 2006: Team Sterilgarda-Berik, Borciani/Rubén Xaus, Ducati 999 F05
- 2007: Team Sterilgarda, Borciani/Xaus, Ducati 999 F06
- 2008: Team Sterilgarda, Xaus, Ducati 1098
- 2009: Team Sterilgarda, Shane Byrne, Ducati 1098

Due to the Great Recession, the team merged with Guandalini Racing to create PATA B&G Racing for the 2010 season.

== Career statistics ==
=== Grand Prix motorcycle racing ===
==== Races by year ====
(key) (Races in bold indicate pole position, races in italics indicate fastest lap)

Year	Class	Bike	1	2	3	4	5	6	7	8	9	10	11	12	13	14	15	Pos	Pts
1997	125cc	Honda	MAL	JPN	SPA	ITA; Ret	AUT	FRA	NED	IMO	GER	BRA	GBR	CZE	CAT	INA	AUS	NC	0

=== Supersport World Championship ===
==== Races by year ====
(key) (Races in bold indicate pole position, races in italics indicate fastest lap)

Year	Bike	1	2	3	4	5	6	7	8	9	10	11	Pos	Pts
1999	Honda	RSA; DNQ	GBR; DNQ	SPA	ITA; 24	GER; 15	SMR; DNQ	USA; Ret	EUR; DNQ	AUT; DNQ	NED; Ret	GER; 27	47th	1

=== Superbike World Championship ===
==== Races by year ====
(key) (Races in bold indicate pole position) (Races in italics indicate fastest lap)

Year	Bike	1		2		3		4		5		6		7		8		9		10		11		12		13		Pos	Pts
Year	Bike	R1	R2	R1	R2	R1	R2	R1	R2	R1	R2	R1	R2	R1	R2	R1	R2	R1	R2	R1	R2	R1	R2	R1	R2	R1	R2	Pos	Pts
2000	Ducati	RSA; 20	RSA; 16	AUS; 16	AUS; 16	JPN; 19	JPN; 19	GBR; 20	GBR; 19	ITA; 21	ITA; Ret	GER; 17	GER; 18	SMR; DNS	SMR; DNS	SPA	SPA	USA; Ret	USA; Ret	GBR; 22	GBR; 14	NED; Ret	NED; Ret	GER; 19	GER; 15	GBR; 21	GBR; Ret	46th	3
2001	Ducati	SPA; 13	SPA; 11	RSA; 15	RSA; Ret	AUS; Ret	AUS; C	JPN; 22	JPN; 23	ITA; 10	ITA; Ret	GBR; Ret	GBR; Ret	GER; 20	GER; Ret	SMR; 17	SMR; Ret	USA; 20	USA; 17	EUR; 15	EUR; 17	GER; Ret	GER; Ret	NED; 21	NED; 18	ITA; Ret	ITA; 15	27th	17
2002	Ducati	SPA; 16	SPA; 12	AUS; 11	AUS; Ret	RSA; 10	RSA; 13	JPN; Ret	JPN; 17	ITA; Ret	ITA; Ret	GBR; Ret	GBR; Ret	GER; 12	GER; 12	SMR; 11	SMR; 10	USA; Ret	USA; 18	GBR; 16	GBR; 15	GER; Ret	GER; 11	NED; 11	NED; 9	ITA; 16	ITA; Ret	15th	55
2003	Ducati	SPA; 9	SPA; 10	AUS; 9	AUS; 10	JPN; 13	JPN; 13	ITA; 8	ITA; 8	GER; 7	GER; 9	GBR; 10	GBR; 13	SMR; 11	SMR; 14	USA; 10	USA; 9	GBR; Ret	GBR; 14	NED; Ret	NED; 13	ITA; 10	ITA; 11	FRA; Ret	FRA; 14			10th	111
2004	Ducati	SPA; 4	SPA; 8	AUS; 7	AUS; 4	SMR; 21	SMR; 10	ITA; 7	ITA; 6	GER; Ret	GER; Ret	GBR; 8	GBR; 11	USA; 11	USA; 8	GBR; 11	GBR; Ret	NED; 9	NED; 8	ITA; 8	ITA; 8	FRA; Ret	FRA; Ret					10th	130
2005	Yamaha	QAT; 12	QAT; Ret	AUS; Ret	AUS; Ret	SPA; 18	SPA; Ret	ITA; 12	ITA; Ret	EUR	EUR																	27th	10
2005	Ducati											SMR; Ret	SMR; DNS	CZE; 18	CZE; Ret	GBR; Ret	GBR; Ret	NED; Ret	NED; DNS	GER; NC	GER; Ret	ITA; 14	ITA; C	FRA; Ret	FRA; Ret			27th	10
2006	Ducati	QAT; 9	QAT; 14	AUS; Ret	AUS; Ret	SPA; 17	SPA; 17	ITA; Ret	ITA; 21	EUR; DNS	EUR; DNS	SMR; Ret	SMR; Ret	CZE; 16	CZE; Ret	GBR; Ret	GBR; Ret	NED; Ret	NED; Ret	GER; Ret	GER; DNS	ITA; Ret	ITA; Ret	FRA	FRA			25th	9
2007	Ducati	QAT	QAT	AUS	AUS	EUR	EUR	SPA	SPA	NED	NED	ITA; 13	ITA; Ret	GBR	GBR	SMR; 11	SMR; Ret	CZE	CZE	GBR	GBR	GER	GER	ITA; 12	ITA; 18	FRA	FRA	20th	12
