= 2005 Phillip Island Superbike World Championship round =

(Australia) 2005 Phillip Island Superbike World Championship round
Round details
- Round 2 of 12 rounds in the 2005 Superbike World Championship. and Round 2 of 12 rounds in the 2005 Supersport World Championship.
- Date: 3 April, 2005
- Location: Phillip Island
- Course: Permanent racing facility 4.445 km (2.762 mi)

Superbike World Championship
Pole position
(Japan) Yukio Kagayama
1:33.241
Fastest lap race 1	Fastest lap race 2
(Australia) Troy Corser	(Australia) Troy Corser
1:34.917	1:34.979

Supersport World Championship
Pole position
(France) Sébastien Charpentier
1:35.746
Fastest lap
(France) Sébastien Charpentier
1:37.438

The 2005 Phillip Island Superbike World Championship round was the second round of the 2005 Superbike World Championship. It took place over the weekend of 1–3 April 2005 at the Phillip Island Grand Prix Circuit near Cowes, Victoria, Australia.

== Results ==
=== Superbike race 1 classification ===
Pos.	No.	Rider	Bike	Laps	Time	Grid	Points
1	11	(Australia) Troy Corser	Suzuki GSX-R1000 K5	22	35:15.199	4	25
2	71	(Japan) Yukio Kagayama	Suzuki GSX-R1000 K5	22	+8.279	1	20
3	77	(Australia) Chris Vermeulen	Honda CBR1000RR	22	+12.551	9	16
4	76	(Germany) Max Neukirchner	Honda CBR1000RR	22	+12.761	3	13
5	88	(Australia) Andrew Pitt	Yamaha YZF R1	22	+13.204	5	11
6	3	(Japan) Norifumi Abe	Yamaha YZF R1	22	+15.116	12	10
7	55	(France) Régis Laconi	Ducati 999 F05	22	+17.195	8	9
8	31	(Australia) Karl Muggeridge	Honda CBR1000RR	22	+33.821	6	8
9	9	(United Kingdom) Chris Walker	Kawasaki ZX 10	22	+34.010	13	7
10	200	(Italy) Giovanni Bussei	Kawasaki ZX 10	22	+42.594	11	6
11	32	(France) Sébastien Gimbert	Yamaha YZF R1	22	+42.851	20	5
12	6	(Italy) Mauro Sanchini	Kawasaki ZX 10	22	+44.556	16	4
13	8	(Italy) Ivan Clementi	Kawasaki ZX 10	22	+44.804	17	3
14	1	(United Kingdom) James Toseland	Ducati 999 F05	22	+1:01.011	10	2
15	93	(New Zealand) Andrew Stroud	Suzuki GSX-R1000 K4	22	+1:32.156	27	1
16	17	(Portugal) Miguel Praia	Yamaha YZF R1	21	+1 lap	28	
Ret	155	(United States) Ben Bostrom	Honda CBR1000RR	21	Retirement	22	
Ret	99	(Australia) Steve Martin	Petronas FP1	14	Retirement	2	
Ret	20	(Italy) Marco Borciani	Yamaha YZF R1	13	Retirement	25	
Ret	41	(Japan) Noriyuki Haga	Yamaha YZF R1	11	Retirement	18	
Ret	12	(Italy) Lorenzo Alfonsi	Yamaha YZF R1	10	Retirement	19	
Ret	27	(Italy) Alessio Corradi	Ducati 999 RS	8	Retirement	23	
Ret	45	(Italy) Gianluca Vizziello	Yamaha YZF R1	5	Retirement	14	
Ret	24	(Australia) Garry McCoy	Petronas FP1	4	Retirement	7	
Ret	19	(Italy) Lucio Pedercini	Ducati 999 RS	4	Retirement	24	
Ret	10	(Spain) Fonsi Nieto	Ducati 999 RS	3	Retirement	21	
Ret	30	(Spain) José Luis Cardoso	Yamaha YZF R1	0	Retirement	15	
DSQ	57	(Italy) Lorenzo Lanzi	Ducati 999 RS	22	Bike under minimum weight	26	
DNS	7	(Italy) Pierfrancesco Chili	Honda CBR1000RR		Did not start		

=== Superbike race 2 classification ===
Pos.	No.	Rider	Bike	Laps	Time	Grid	Points
1	11	(Australia) Troy Corser	Suzuki GSX-R1000 K5	22	37:34.183	4	25
2	71	(Japan) Yukio Kagayama	Suzuki GSX-R1000 K5	22	+5.822	1	20
3	76	(Germany) Max Neukirchner	Honda CBR1000RR	22	+10.897	3	16
4	77	(Australia) Chris Vermeulen	Honda CBR1000RR	22	+18.757	9	13
5	10	(Spain) Fonsi Nieto	Ducati 999 RS	22	+53.089	21	11
6	27	(Italy) Alessio Corradi	Ducati 999 RS	22	+54.127	23	10
7	55	(France) Régis Laconi	Ducati 999 F05	22	+58.076	8	9
8	3	(Japan) Norifumi Abe	Yamaha YZF R1	22	+1:03.328	12	8
9	200	(Italy) Giovanni Bussei	Kawasaki ZX 10	22	+1:04.355	11	7
10	6	(Italy) Mauro Sanchini	Kawasaki ZX 10	22	+1:08.754	16	6
11	155	(United States) Ben Bostrom	Honda CBR1000RR	22	+1:14.447	22	5
12	93	(New Zealand) Andrew Stroud	Suzuki GSX-R1000 K4	22	+1:16.710	27	4
13	57	(Italy) Lorenzo Lanzi	Ducati 999 RS	22	+1:20.004	26	3
14	17	(Portugal) Miguel Praia	Yamaha YZF R1	22	+2:44.473	28	2
Ret	12	(Italy) Lorenzo Alfonsi	Yamaha YZF R1	16	Retirement	19	
Ret	9	(United Kingdom) Chris Walker	Kawasaki ZX 10	15	Retirement	13	
Ret	99	(Australia) Steve Martin	Petronas FP1	14	Retirement	2	
Ret	41	(Japan) Noriyuki Haga	Yamaha YZF R1	13	Retirement	18	
Ret	88	(Australia) Andrew Pitt	Yamaha YZF R1	12	Retirement	5	
Ret	24	(Australia) Garry McCoy	Petronas FP1	12	Retirement	7	
Ret	20	(Italy) Marco Borciani	Yamaha YZF R1	11	Retirement	25	
Ret	32	(France) Sébastien Gimbert	Yamaha YZF R1	9	Retirement	20	
Ret	30	(Spain) José Luis Cardoso	Yamaha YZF R1	7	Retirement	15	
Ret	1	(United Kingdom) James Toseland	Ducati 999 F05	5	Retirement	10	
Ret	31	(Australia) Karl Muggeridge	Honda CBR1000RR	5	Retirement	6	
Ret	8	(Italy) Ivan Clementi	Kawasaki ZX 10	1	Retirement	17	
Ret	45	(Italy) Gianluca Vizziello	Yamaha YZF R1	1	Retirement	14	
Ret	19	(Italy) Lucio Pedercini	Ducati 999 RS	1	Retirement	24	
DNS	7	(Italy) Pierfrancesco Chili	Honda CBR1000RR		Did not start		

=== Supersport race classification ===
Pos.	No.	Rider	Bike	Laps	Time	Grid	Points
1	16	(France) Sébastien Charpentier	Honda CBR600RR	21	34:28.920	1	25
2	11	(Australia) Kevin Curtain	Yamaha YZF-R6	21	+3.595	4	20
3	99	(France) Fabien Foret	Honda CBR600RR	21	+9.641	3	16
4	21	(Japan) Katsuaki Fujiwara	Honda CBR600RR	21	+9.664	5	13
5	3	(Netherlands) Jurgen van den Goorbergh	Ducati 749 R	21	+29.602	9	11
6	116	(Sweden) Johan Stigefelt	Honda CBR600RR	21	+34.168	8	10
7	23	(Australia) Broc Parkes	Yamaha YZF-R6	21	+42.695	12	9
8	8	(France) Stéphane Chambon	Honda CBR600RR	21	+46.360	6	8
9	25	(Finland) Tatu Lauslehto	Honda CBR600RR	21	+48.976	14	7
10	24	(France) Christophe Cogan	Suzuki GSX 600R	21	+56.859	11	6
11	12	(Spain) Javier Forés	Suzuki GSX 600R	21	+1:20.356	10	5
12	48	(Spain) David García	Kawasaki ZX 6RR	21	+1:20.461	15	4
13	58	(Czech Republic) Tomáš Mikšovský	Honda CBR600RR	21	+1:28.701	18	3
14	59	(Poland) Paweł Szkopek	Honda CBR600RR	20	+1 lap	16	2
Ret	84	(Italy) Michel Fabrizio	Honda CBR600RR	18	Retirement	2	
Ret	30	(Italy) Alessandro Antonello	Kawasaki ZX 6RR	6	Retirement	13	
Ret	15	(Italy) Matteo Baiocco	Kawasaki ZX 6RR	5	Retirement	19	
Ret	14	(Italy) Andrea Berta	Ducati 749 R	1	Retirement	17	
Ret	69	(Italy) Gianluca Nannelli	Ducati 749 R	0	Retirement	7	
