= 2005 Valencia Superbike World Championship round =

(Spain) 2005 Valencia Superbike World Championship round
Round details
- Round 3 of 12 rounds in the 2005 Superbike World Championship. and Round 3 of 12 rounds in the 2005 Supersport World Championship.
- Date: April 24, 2005
- Location: Valencia
- Course: Permanent racing facility 4.005 km (2.489 mi)

Superbike World Championship
Pole position
(Australia) Troy Corser
1:35.676
Fastest lap race 1	Fastest lap race 2
(Australia) Troy Corser	(Australia) Troy Corser
1:36.721	1:37.756

Supersport World Championship
Pole position
(France) Sébastien Charpentier
1:38.351
Fastest lap
(France) Sébastien Charpentier
1:38.976

The 2005 Valencia Superbike World Championship round was the third round of the 2005 Superbike World Championship. It took place on the weekend of April 22–24, 2005 at the Circuit Ricardo Tormo in Valencia, Spain.

== Results ==
=== Superbike race 1 classification ===
Pos.	No.	Rider	Bike	Laps	Time	Grid	Points
1	11	(Australia) Troy Corser	Suzuki GSX-R1000 K5	23	37:31.052	1	25
2	77	(Australia) Chris Vermeulen	Honda CBR1000RR	23	+9.116	2	20
3	71	(Japan) Yukio Kagayama	Suzuki GSX-R1000 K5	23	+12.788	9	16
4	9	(United Kingdom) Chris Walker	Kawasaki ZX 10	23	+16.867	7	13
5	41	(Japan) Noriyuki Haga	Yamaha YZF-R1	23	+17.882	10	11
6	32	(France) Sébastien Gimbert	Yamaha YZF-R1	23	+26.495	15	10
7	7	(Italy) Pierfrancesco Chili	Honda CBR1000RR	23	+28.784	12	9
8	1	(United Kingdom) James Toseland	Ducati 999 F05	23	+36.604	23	8
9	16	(Spain) Sergio Fuertes	Suzuki GSX-R1000	23	+39.524	26	7
10	94	(Spain) David Checa	Yamaha YZF-R1	23	+39.775	11	6
11	8	(Italy) Ivan Clementi	Kawasaki ZX 10	23	+40.047	19	5
12	155	(United States) Ben Bostrom	Honda CBR1000RR	23	+42.941	16	4
13	200	(Italy) Giovanni Bussei	Kawasaki ZX 10	23	+47.505	28	3
14	12	(Italy) Lorenzo Alfonsi	Yamaha YZF-R1	23	+47.585	20	2
15	22	(Spain) Iván Silva	Yamaha YZF-R1	23	+48.993	25	1
16	45	(Italy) Gianluca Vizziello	Yamaha YZF-R1	23	+49.064	29	
17	10	(Spain) Fonsi Nieto	Ducati 999 RS	23	+53.338	24	
18	20	(Italy) Marco Borciani	Yamaha YZF-R1	23	+54.572	22	
19	21	(Belgium) Michel Nickmans	Yamaha YZF-R1	22	+1 lap	32	
Ret	3	(Japan) Norifumi Abe	Yamaha YZF-R1	21	Retirement	8	
Ret	31	(Australia) Karl Muggeridge	Honda CBR1000RR	19	Retirement	6	
Ret	6	(Italy) Mauro Sanchini	Kawasaki ZX 10	16	Retirement	21	
Ret	24	(Australia) Garry McCoy	Petronas FP1	14	Retirement	18	
Ret	17	(Portugal) Miguel Praia	Yamaha YZF-R1	10	Retirement	31	
Ret	99	(Australia) Steve Martin	Petronas FP1	9	Retirement	14	
Ret	25	(Italy) Alessio Velini	Ducati 999 RS	7	Retirement	30	
Ret	88	(Australia) Andrew Pitt	Yamaha YZF-R1	5	Retirement	5	
Ret	19	(Italy) Lucio Pedercini	Ducati 999 RS	5	Retirement	27	
Ret	30	(Spain) José Luis Cardoso	Yamaha YZF-R1	3	Retirement	17	
Ret	57	(Italy) Lorenzo Lanzi	Ducati 999 RS	0	Retirement	13	
Ret	76	(Germany) Max Neukirchner	Honda CBR1000RR	0	Retirement	4	
DNS	55	(France) Régis Laconi	Ducati 999 F05		Injured	3	
DNS	67	(Spain) Bernat Martínez	Yamaha YZF-R1		Did not start	33	

=== Superbike race 2 classification ===
Pos.	No.	Rider	Bike	Laps	Time	Grid	Points
1	11	(Australia) Troy Corser	Suzuki GSX-R1000 K5	23	37:52.057	1	25
2	77	(Australia) Chris Vermeulen	Honda CBR1000RR	23	+5.361	2	20
3	9	(United Kingdom) Chris Walker	Kawasaki ZX 10	23	+7.184	7	16
4	41	(Japan) Noriyuki Haga	Yamaha YZF-R1	23	+10.600	10	13
5	3	(Japan) Norifumi Abe	Yamaha YZF-R1	23	+11.903	8	11
6	155	(United States) Ben Bostrom	Honda CBR1000RR	23	+19.200	16	10
7	71	(Japan) Yukio Kagayama	Suzuki GSX-R1000 K5	23	+19.345	9	9
8	88	(Australia) Andrew Pitt	Yamaha YZF-R1	23	+23.246	5	8
9	94	(Spain) David Checa	Yamaha YZF-R1	23	+24.787	11	7
10	7	(Italy) Pierfrancesco Chili	Honda CBR1000RR	23	+25.299	12	6
11	32	(France) Sébastien Gimbert	Yamaha YZF-R1	23	+25.495	15	5
12	76	(Germany) Max Neukirchner	Honda CBR1000RR	23	+27.833	4	4
13	8	(Italy) Ivan Clementi	Kawasaki ZX 10	23	+31.339	19	3
14	45	(Italy) Gianluca Vizziello	Yamaha YZF-R1	23	+33.013	29	2
15	12	(Italy) Lorenzo Alfonsi	Yamaha YZF-R1	23	+34.024	20	1
16	16	(Spain) Sergio Fuertes	Suzuki GSX-R1000	23	+39.889	26	
17	99	(Australia) Steve Martin	Petronas FP1	23	+41.728	14	
18	6	(Italy) Mauro Sanchini	Kawasaki ZX 10	23	+50.912	21	
19	1	(United Kingdom) James Toseland	Ducati 999 F05	22	+1 lap	23	
Ret	31	(Australia) Karl Muggeridge	Honda CBR1000RR	15	Retirement	6	
Ret	10	(Spain) Fonsi Nieto	Ducati 999 RS	15	Retirement	24	
Ret	20	(Italy) Marco Borciani	Yamaha YZF-R1	12	Retirement	22	
Ret	30	(Spain) José Luis Cardoso	Yamaha YZF-R1	10	Retirement	17	
Ret	17	(Portugal) Miguel Praia	Yamaha YZF-R1	10	Retirement	31	
Ret	22	(Spain) Iván Silva	Yamaha YZF-R1	10	Retirement	25	
Ret	21	(Belgium) Michel Nickmans	Yamaha YZF-R1	8	Retirement	32	
Ret	200	(Italy) Giovanni Bussei	Kawasaki ZX 10	5	Retirement	28	
Ret	19	(Italy) Lucio Pedercini	Ducati 999 RS	4	Retirement	27	
Ret	24	(Australia) Garry McCoy	Petronas FP1	3	Retirement	18	
Ret	25	(Italy) Alessio Velini	Ducati 999 RS	3	Retirement	30	
DNS	55	(France) Régis Laconi	Ducati 999 F05		Injured	3	
DNS	57	(Italy) Lorenzo Lanzi	Ducati 999 RS		Did not start	13	
DNS	67	(Spain) Bernat Martínez	Yamaha YZF-R1		Did not start	33	

=== Supersport race classification ===
Pos.	No.	Rider	Bike	Laps	Time	Grid	Points
1	16	(France) Sébastien Charpentier	Honda CBR600RR	23	38:27.276	1	25
2	21	(Japan) Katsuaki Fujiwara	Honda CBR600RR	23	+0.844	2	20
3	11	(Australia) Kevin Curtain	Yamaha YZF-R6	23	+21.382	4	16
4	84	(Italy) Michel Fabrizio	Honda CBR600RR	23	+25.602	5	13
5	99	(France) Fabien Foret	Honda CBR600RR	23	+31.478	3	11
6	23	(Australia) Broc Parkes	Yamaha YZF-R6	23	+32.837	6	10
7	77	(Netherlands) Barry Veneman	Suzuki GSX 600R	23	+36.134	10	9
8	69	(Italy) Gianluca Nannelli	Ducati 749 R	23	+38.076	12	8
9	8	(France) Stéphane Chambon	Honda CBR600RR	23	+38.297	9	7
10	116	(Sweden) Johan Stigefelt	Honda CBR600RR	23	+38.750	8	6
11	12	(Spain) Javier Forés	Suzuki GSX 600R	23	+44.507	11	5
12	71	(Belgium) Werner Daemen	Honda CBR600RR	23	+45.628	13	4
13	45	(Belgium) Sébastien Le Grelle	Honda CBR600RR	23	+52.390	14	3
14	87	(Spain) Arturo Tizón	Yamaha YZF-R6	23	+52.463	15	2
15	25	(Finland) Tatu Lauslehto	Honda CBR600RR	23	+53.109	16	1
16	24	(France) Christophe Cogan	Suzuki GSX 600R	23	+1:01.901	17	
17	19	(Netherlands) Jarno Janssen	Suzuki GSX 600R	23	+1:14.140	18	
18	28	(Finland) Sami Penna	Honda CBR600RR	23	+1:21.634	28	
19	58	(Czech Republic) Tomáš Mikšovský	Honda CBR600RR	23	+1:24.882	22	
Ret	59	(Poland) Paweł Szkopek	Honda CBR600RR	16	Retirement	27	
Ret	88	(France) Julien Enjolras	Yamaha YZF-R6	15	Retirement	20	
Ret	43	(Brazil) Pedro Henrique Martins	Yamaha YZF-R6	15	Retirement	26	
Ret	14	(Italy) Andrea Berta	Ducati 749 R	10	Retirement	23	
Ret	127	(Denmark) Robbin Harms	Honda CBR600RR	8	Retirement	24	
Ret	30	(Italy) Alessandro Antonello	Kawasaki ZX 6RR	7	Retirement	19	
Ret	100	(Finland) Topi Haarala	Honda CBR600RR	5	Retirement	21	
Ret	15	(Italy) Matteo Baiocco	Kawasaki ZX 6RR	5	Retirement	25	
Ret	86	(Spain) Víctor Carrasco	Yamaha YZF-R6	0	Retirement	7	
DNS	48	(Spain) David García	Kawasaki ZX 6RR		Did not start	29	
DNS	3	(Netherlands) Jurgen van den Goorbergh	Ducati 749 R		Did not start	30	
