= Miguel Praia =

Portuguese motorcycle racer

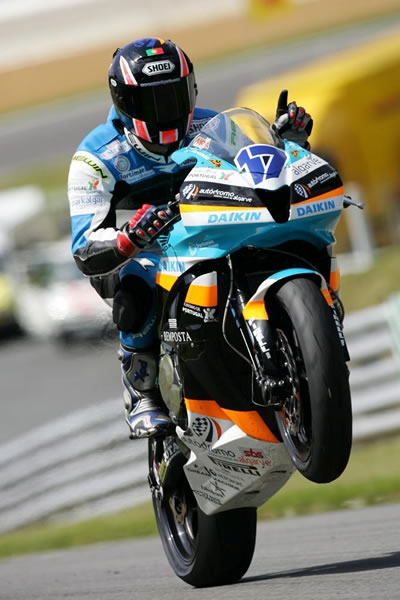
- Nationality: Portuguese
- Born: 2 March 1978 (age 48); Portalegre, Portugal
Motorcycle racing career statistics
250cc World Championship
Active years	2003
Manufacturers	Yamaha
Championships	0
2003 championship position	NC (0 pts)
Starts / Wins / Podiums / Poles / F. laps / Points; 1 / 0 / 0 / 0 / 0 / 0
Superbike World Championship
Active years	2004–2005
Manufacturers	Ducati, Yamaha
Championships	0
2013 championship position	34th (3 pts)
Starts / Wins / Podiums / Poles / F. laps / Points; 40 / 0 / 0 / 0 / 0 / 11
Supersport World Championship
Active years	2006–2013, 2015
Manufacturers	Honda
Championships	0
2015 championship position	37th (1 pt)
Starts / Wins / Podiums / Poles / F. laps / Points; 80 / 0 / 0 / 0 / 0 / 177

Miguel Praia (born 2 March 1978) is a retired Portuguese motorcycle racer. He was the first Portuguese racer to participate full time in the Superbike World Championship. As of 2025, he is the director of the Algarve International Autodrome (AIA) Motor Club, which hosts the Portuguese MotoGP Grand Prix.

== Career ==
=== Portuguese championships ===
Praia was born in Portalegre, Portugal. His first race was in 1994 at the age of 16 on a Yamaha TZR50. In 1997, he rode a full championship for the first time, finishing third overall riding a Yamaha TZR125.

After the death of his brother Alberto, Praia stopped racing, but returned in 1999 riding a Yamaha TZ125 in the Portuguese 125GP championship, finishing in sixth place.

In 2000, Praia had a good year in the newly established Aprilia Challenge 125cc, ending most races in first place and setting several lap records, but a jury decision in the last round placed him in second position overall.

In 2001, Praia moved up into the 600cc category. He finished in eighth position in Troféu Honda CBR600RR.

After a not outstanding year in a supersport class, 2002 was Praia's breakout year. He set new lap records in most rounds, and became champion for Troféu Honda CBR600RR 2002. In 2003, he repeated this achievement, winning the champion's title for Troféu Honda CBR600RR again.

In 2005, at the end of the Portuguese Stocksport 1000 championship, Praia entered the Superbike World Championship, winning the last two races on a Honda CBR1000RR he had never ridden before.

=== European championships ===
In an attempt to get more and better experience from an international competition, in 2002 and 2003, Praia raced in European Supersport Championship, as the highest-performing Portuguese racer.

=== World championships ===
By invitation of the Portuguese Government,Praia participated in the Macau Grand Prix in 2002 and in 2003, finishing fifth and fourth respectively. In 2003, he entered the Portuguese round of the MotoGP 250cc championship as a wildcard and finished 22nd.

2004 was Praia's first year in full World class championships. He joined team NCR Ducati in the Superbike World Championship along with his teammate Garry McCoy. As the number 2 in the team and a newcomer into the Superbikes world, Praia had a disappointing season, racing on a Ducati 999RS and then a Ducati 998RS. He finished the championship in 30th place.

Praia switched teams the following year to join DFX Extreme team with a Yamaha R1 in 2005, and saw much improvement in his lap times, but in a year with many newcomers from other world championships in the Superbikes class, his finishing placing dropped to 34th.

Praia switched to a lower class in 2006, the Supersport World Championship, but this time with a new Portuguese team, Parkalgar Racing Team, and riding a Honda CBR600RR. The team experiences some problems in getting the right setup for the machine, and the year did not go well; Praia had to abandon some races due to mechanical failures, and eventually retired from the championship.

In 2007, Praia made better lap times compared with the previous years, but more new rivals from Superbikes and other world championships also joined the championship, and his faster speeds were not reflected in the final standings, again finishing 34th.

In 2008, the Parkalgar Racing Team secured Factory Honda support and a new Honda CBR600RR better shaped then the previous year's ones. The pre-season tests at Almería (Circuito de Almería) in January raised expectations for the team, with Praia's team-mate Craig Jones setting a new lap record for the track and Miguel Praia less than a second behind.

=== Career highlights ===
- 1997 - 3rd place in 125cc Produção (Portuguese championship)
- 1999 - 6th place in 125GP (Best Rookie) (Portuguese championship)
- 2000 - 2nd place in Aprilia Challenge 125cc (Portuguese championship)
- 2001 - 8th place in Troféu Honda CBR600RR (Portuguese championship)
- 2002 - Champion in Troféu Honda CBR600RR (Portuguese championship)
- 2002 - Best Portuguese in European Supersport Championship
- 2002 - 5th place in Macau GP
- 2003 - Champion in Troféu Honda CBR600RR
- 2003 - 22nd place in Portuguese round (in Autódromo do Estoril) of MotoGP 250cc
- 2003 - Best Portuguese in European Supersport Championship
- 2003 - 4th place in Macau GP
- 2004 - 30th place in Superbike World Championship (Best Rookie)
- 2005 - 34th place in Superbike World Championship
- 2006 - Not-classified in Supersport World Championship
- 2007 - 34th place in Supersport World Championship
- 2008 - 25th place in Supersport World Championship
- 2009 - 15th place in Supersport World Championship
- 2010 - 12th place in Supersport World Championship
- 2011 - 13th place in Supersport World Championship
- 2012 - 23rd place in CEV Moto2 Championship
- 2013 – 1st place in Superbike category of 500 Miles Brazil
- 2013 – 4th place in Brazilian Moto 1000 GP Championship
- 2014 – 4th place in Brazilian Moto 1000 GP Championship
- 2015 – 4th place in Brazilian Moto 1000 GP Championship

== Career statistics ==
=== Grand Prix motorcycle racing ===
==== Races by year ====
(key) (Races in bold indicate pole position, races in italics indicate fastest lap)

Year	Class	Bike	1	2	3	4	5	6	7	8	9	10	11	12	13	14	15	16	Pos	Pts
2003	250cc	Yamaha	JPN	RSA	SPA	FRA	ITA	CAT	NED	GBR	GER	CZE	POR; 22	BRA	PAC	MAL	AUS	VAL	NC	0

=== Superbike World Championship ===
==== Races by year ====
(key) (Races in bold indicate pole position, races in italics indicate fastest lap)

Year	Bike	1		2		3		4		5		6		7		8		9		10		11		12		Pos	Pts
Year	Bike	R1	R2	R1	R2	R1	R2	R1	R2	R1	R2	R1	R2	R1	R2	R1	R2	R1	R2	R1	R2	R1	R2	R1	R2	Pos	Pts
2004	Ducati	SPA; 13	SPA; 19	AUS; 16	AUS; Ret	SMR; DNQ	SMR; DNQ	ITA; Ret	ITA; Ret	GER; 17	GER; Ret	GBR; 14	GBR; Ret	USA; DNS	USA; Ret	EUR; Ret	EUR; 15	NED; Ret	NED; 16	ITA; Ret	ITA; 21	FRA; 18	FRA; 14			30th	8
2005	Yamaha	QAT; 20	QAT; 18	AUS; 16	AUS; 14	SPA; Ret	SPA; Ret	ITA; 23	ITA; Ret	EUR; 15	EUR; Ret	SMR; 18	SMR; 16	CZE; 23	CZE; 21	GBR; Ret	GBR; Ret	NED; 21	NED; 19	GER; 16	GER; 18	ITA	ITA	FRA	FRA	34th	3

=== Supersport World Championship ===
==== Races by year ====
(key) (Races in bold indicate pole position, races in italics indicate fastest lap)

Year	Bike	1	2	3	4	5	6	7	8	9	10	11	12	13	14	Pos	Pts
2006	Honda	QAT	AUS	SPA; 20	ITA; 19	EUR; 23	SMR; Ret	CZE; Ret	GBR; 27	NED; 18	GER; 18	ITA; Ret	FRA; 16			NC	0
2007	Honda	QAT; 19	AUS; 24	EUR; 20	SPA; 21	NED; Ret	ITA; 21	GBR; 11	SMR; 21	CZE; Ret	GBR; 21	GER; Ret	ITA; Ret	FRA; Ret		34th	5
2008	Honda	QAT; 13	AUS; 21	SPA; 15	NED; 17	ITA; Ret	GER; 13	SMR; Ret	CZE; Ret	GBR; Ret	EUR; Ret	ITA; 13	FRA; Ret	POR; 12		25th	14
2009	Honda	AUS; Ret	QAT; 12	SPA; 18	NED; Ret	ITA; 12	RSA; 16	USA; 12	SMR; 10	GBR; Ret	CZE; Ret	GER; 11	ITA; 9	FRA; 12	POR; 10	15th	40
2010	Honda	AUS; 9	POR; Ret	SPA; 12	NED; 10	ITA; 10	RSA; 10	USA; 14	SMR; 9	CZE; 7	GBR; 6	GER; 13	ITA; Ret	FRA; 10		12th	66
2011	Honda	AUS; Ret	EUR; 11	NED; 8	ITA; Ret	SMR; 12	SPA; 9	CZE; Ret	GBR; 8	GER; Ret	ITA; 8	FRA; 13	POR; 8			13th	51
2012	Honda	AUS	ITA	NED	ITA	EUR	SMR	SPA	CZE	GBR	RUS	GER; 16	POR; 17	FRA; 22		NC	0
2013	Honda	AUS	SPA	NED	ITA	GBR	POR; 20	ITA	RUS	GBR	GER	TUR	FRA	SPA		NC	0
2015	Honda	AUS	THA	SPA	NED	ITA	GBR	POR; 15	ITA	MAL	SPA	FRA	QAT			37th	1
