= Gianluca Vizziello =

Italian motorcycle racer

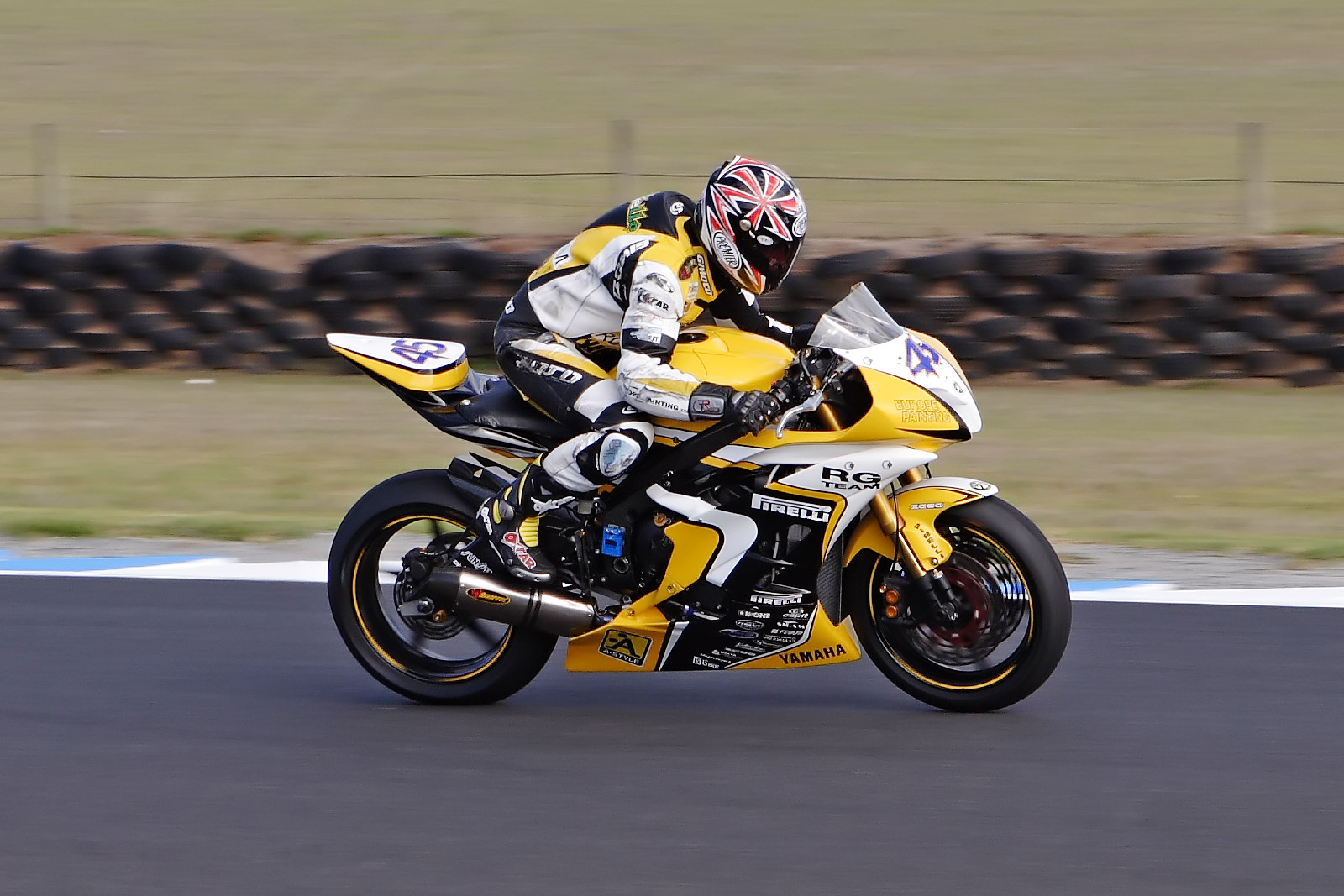
- Vizziello in 2007
- Nationality: Italian
- Born: 3 March 1980 (age 46); Policoro, Italy
- Current team: Team Green Speed
- Bike number: 45
Motorcycle racing career statistics
Superbike World Championship
Active years	2005, 2015–2016
Manufacturers	Yamaha, Kawasaki
2016 championship position	28th (4 pts)
Starts / Wins / Podiums / Poles / F. laps / Points; 48 / 0 / 0 / 0 / 0 / 26
Supersport World Championship
Active years	2006–2011
Manufacturers	Yamaha, Honda
2011 championship position	NC (0 pts)
Starts / Wins / Podiums / Poles / F. laps / Points; 52 / 0 / 0 / 0 / 1 / 228

Gianluca Vizziello (born 3 March 1980 in Policoro) is an Italian motorcycle racer. He currently competes in the CIV Supersport Championship aboard a Kawasaki ZX-6R.

== Career ==
=== FIM Superstock 1000 Cup ===
In 2000, Vizziello made his debut in the FIM Superstock 1000 Cup. He made four starts that season with a best finish of fifth at Oschersleben. In 2001, Vizziello competed full-time in the championship and finished sixth in the standings. Vizziello got his first win in 2002, winning the round at Misano. With additional strong results he finished third in the championship that season. 2003 was an up and down season for Vizziello and he dropped to sixth in the championship. Vizziello had an incredibly strong 2004 season. He won five of the first seven races and finished second in the other two races. But after being unable to participate in the final two rounds of the season he missed out on the title by nine points.

=== Superbike World Championship ===
Vizziello moved up to the Superbike World Championship for 2005, riding a Yamaha YZF-R1 for the Italia Lorenzini by Leoni team. Vizziello endured a difficult rookie season as he only scored points three times with a best finish of tenth at Imola. He finished 28th in the championship with nine points. Vizziello made a surprise return to the Superbike World Championship midway through the 2015 season, riding a Kawasaki ZX-10R for the Grillini SBK Team for the remainder of the season. He scored 13 points with a best finish of eleventh at Magny-Cours. Vizziello substituted for Román Ramos at the 2016 rounds of Imola and Sepang after Ramos got injured in second free practice at Imola. Later that season, Vizziello rejoined the Grillini Racing Team for the remainder of the season.

=== Supersport World Championship ===
Vizziello moved down to the Supersport World Championship for 2006, riding a Yamaha YZF-R6 for Yamaha Team Italia. Vizziello had a solid rookie season and finished ninth in the championship with a best finish of fourth at Imola. Vizziello moved to the RG Team for 2007 and had an up and down season with a best finish of fourth at Magny-Cours. He finished tenth in the championship that year. Vizziello moved to Berry Racing for the 2008 season riding a Honda CBR600RR. Vizziello could not improve on his previous seasons but he did score his first fastest lap at Assen. Vizziello moved to the team of Johan Stigefelt for the 2009 season. He had a difficult season and Vizziello had to step out of the championship after the Nürburgring round due to the economic situation of the team combined with disappointing results. For the next two years, Vizziello sporadically appeared in the championship starting in three races.

== Career statistics ==
2004 - 2nd, Superstock European Championship, Yamaha YZF-R1

=== Superstock European Championship ===
==== Races by year ====
(key) (Races in bold indicate pole position) (Races in italics indicate fastest lap)

Year	Bike	1	2	3	4	5	6	7	8	9	Pos	Pts
2000	Yamaha	DON	MNZ	HOC	SMR	VAL	BRA; 14	OSC; 19	NED; 5	BRA2; 24	24th	13
2001	Yamaha	VAL; 13	MNZ; 9	DON; Ret	LAU; 6	SMR; Ret	BRA; 8	OSC; 8	NED; 4	IMO; 6	6th	59
2002	Yamaha	VAL	MNZ; 4	SIL; 8	LAU; 2	SMR; 1	BRA; 6	OSC; EX	NED; 4	IMO; 5	3rd	100
2003	Yamaha	VAL; 12	MNZ; Ret	OSC; 2	SIL; 2	SMR; Ret	BRA; 5	NED; 3	IMO; 8	MAG; Ret	6th	79
2004	Yamaha	VAL; 1	SMR; 2	MNZ; 1	OSC; 1	SIL; 2	BRA; 1	NED; 2	IMO; WD	MAG; WD	2nd	160

=== CIV Championship (Campionato Italiano Velocita) ===
==== Races by year ====
(key) (Races in bold indicate pole position; races in italics indicate fastest lap)

Year	Class	Bike	1	2	3	4	5	Pos	Pts
2002	Stock 1000	Yamaha	IMO; 6	**VAL**; 1	MUG; 3	MIS1; 2	MIS2; 2	2nd	81 (91)
2003	Stock 1000	Yamaha	MIS1; 3	MUG1	MIS1	MUG2	VAL	14th	16

=== Superbike World Championship ===
==== Races by year ====
Year	Make	1		2		3		4		5		6		7		8		9		10		11		12		13		Pos.	Pts
Year	Make	R1	R2	R1	R2	R1	R2	R1	R2	R1	R2	R1	R2	R1	R2	R1	R2	R1	R2	R1	R2	R1	R2	R1	R2	R1	R2	Pos.	Pts
2005	Yamaha	QAT; 19	QAT; 17	AUS; Ret	AUS; Ret	SPA; 16	SPA; 14	ITA; 21	ITA; Ret	EUR	EUR	SMR; 17	SMR; Ret	CZE; 21	CZE; Ret	GBR; 17	GBR; 17	NED; 16	NED; Ret	GER; Ret	GER; Ret	ITA; 10	ITA; C	FRA; Ret	FRA; 15			28th	9
2015	Kawasaki	AUS	AUS	THA	THA	SPA	SPA	NED	NED	ITA	ITA	GBR	GBR	POR	POR	ITA; 20	ITA; 19	USA; 15	USA; 14	MAL; Ret	MAL; 17	SPA; 22	SPA; 17	FRA; 11	FRA; 17	QAT; 15	QAT; 12	26th	13
2016	Kawasaki	AUS	AUS	THA	THA	SPA	SPA	NED	NED	ITA; DNQ	ITA; Ret	MAL; 18	MAL; 16	GBR	GBR	ITA; 20	ITA; Ret	USA; NC	USA; 17	GER; 19	GER; 13	FRA; 21	FRA; 17	SPA; 16	SPA; 15	QAT; 21	QAT; 17	28th	4

=== Supersport World Championship ===
==== Races by year ====
Year	Bike	1	2	3	4	5	6	7	8	9	10	11	12	13	14	Pos.	Pts
2006	Yamaha	QAT; 9	AUS; 13	SPA; 9	ITA; Ret	EUR; Ret	SMR; 7	CZE; 5	GBR; Ret	NED; 7	GER; 6	ITA; 4	FRA; Ret			9th	69
2007	Yamaha	QAT; 15	AUS; Ret	EUR; 12	SPA; 11	NED; 18	ITA; 20	GBR; 5	SMR; 9	CZE; Ret	GBR; 11	GER; 13	ITA; 5	FRA; 4		10th	60
2008	Honda	QAT; 10	AUS; 8	SPA; 12	NED; 8	ITA; Ret	GER; 14	SMR; 11	CZE; 12	GBR; 12	EUR; 11	ITA; 15	FRA; 11	POR; 8		11th	60
2009	Honda	AUS; Ret	QAT; 14	SPA; 11	NED; Ret	ITA; 14	RSA; 17	USA; 15	SMR; 11	GBR; 7	CZE; 14	GER; 13	ITA	FRA	POR	18th	29
2010	Honda	AUS	POR	SPA	NED	ITA; 12	RSA	USA	SMR	CZE	GBR	GER	ITA; 10	FRA		20th	10
2011	Honda	AUS	EUR	NED	ITA	SMR	SPA	CZE	GBR	GER	ITA	FRA	POR; 20			NC	0

=== CIV Stock 1000 Championship ===
==== Races by year ====
(key) (Races in bold indicate pole position; races in italics indicate fastest lap)

Year	Bike	1	2	3	4	5	Pos	Pts
2001	Yamaha	MIS1	MON; 2	VAL; 2	MIS2; 2	MIS3; 1	2nd	85
