= 2006 Brands Hatch Superbike World Championship round =

(United Kingdom) 2006 Brands Hatch Superbike World Championship round
Round details
- Round 8 of 12 rounds in the 2006 Superbike World Championship. and Round 8 of 12 rounds in the 2006 Supersport World Championship.
- Date: 6 August, 2006
- Location: Brands Hatch
- Course: Permanent racing facility 3.703 km (2.301 mi)

Superbike World Championship
Pole position
(Australia) Troy Bayliss
1:25.449
Fastest lap race 1	Fastest lap race 2
(United Kingdom) James Toseland	(Australia) Troy Bayliss
1:26.351	1:26.706

Supersport World Championship
Pole position
(Australia) Broc Parkes
1:28.447
Fastest lap
(Australia) Kevin Curtain
1:29.074

The 2006 Brands Hatch Superbike World Championship round was the eighth round of the 2006 Superbike World Championship. It took place on the weekend of 4–6 August 2006 at the Brands Hatch circuit.

== Results ==
=== Superbike race 1 classification ===
Pos	No	Rider	Bike	Laps	Time	Grid	Points
1	21	(Australia) Troy Bayliss	Ducati 999 F06	25	36:26.855	1	25
2	52	(United Kingdom) James Toseland	Honda CBR1000RR	25	+1.657	4	20
3	41	(Japan) Noriyuki Haga	Yamaha YZF R1	25	+2.248	2	16
4	88	(Australia) Andrew Pitt	Yamaha YZF R1	25	+2.860	6	13
5	71	(Japan) Yukio Kagayama	Suzuki GSX-R1000 K6	25	+9.666	9	11
6	1	(Australia) Troy Corser	Suzuki GSX-R1000 K6	25	+16.731	5	10
7	9	(United Kingdom) Chris Walker	Kawasaki ZX 10R	25	+16.892	8	9
8	4	(Brazil) Alex Barros	Honda CBR1000RR	25	+20.707	18	8
9	55	(France) Régis Laconi	Kawasaki ZX 10R	25	+25.196	7	7
10	11	(Spain) Rubén Xaus	Ducati 999 F05	25	+25.338	13	6
11	81	(United Kingdom) Tommy Hill	Yamaha YZF R1	25	+26.477	10	5
12	57	(Italy) Lorenzo Lanzi	Ducati 999 F06	25	+26.709	11	4
13	3	(Japan) Norifumi Abe	Yamaha YZF R1	25	+27.335	19	3
14	10	(Spain) Fonsi Nieto	Kawasaki ZX 10R	25	+29.465	12	2
15	16	(France) Sébastien Gimbert	Yamaha YZF R1	25	+39.195	15	1
16	13	(Italy) Vittorio Iannuzzo	Suzuki GSX-R1000 K6	25	+40.408	23	
17	99	(Australia) Steve Martin	Petronas FP1	25	+42.389	17	
18	44	(Italy) Roberto Rolfo	Ducati 999 F05	25	+48.053	25	
19	38	(Japan) Shinichi Nakatomi	Yamaha YZF R1	25	+51.243	26	
20	25	(Australia) Josh Brookes	Kawasaki ZX 10R	25	+51.999	22	
21	8	(Italy) Ivan Clementi	Ducati 999 RS	25	+59.569	21	
Ret	20	(Italy) Marco Borciani	Ducati 999 F05	14	Retirement	20	
Ret	18	(United Kingdom) Craig Jones	Petronas FP1	12	Retirement	24	
Ret	7	(Italy) Pierfrancesco Chili	Honda CBR1000RR	10	Retirement	16	
Ret	80	(United States) Kurtis Roberts	Ducati 999 RS	8	Retirement	27	
Ret	84	(Italy) Michel Fabrizio	Honda CBR1000RR	5	Retirement	14	
Ret	31	(Australia) Karl Muggeridge	Honda CBR1000RR	4	Retirement	3	

=== Superbike race 2 classification ===
Pos	No	Rider	Bike	Laps	Time	Grid	Points
1	41	(Japan) Noriyuki Haga	Yamaha YZF R1	25	36:29.709	2	25
2	21	(Australia) Troy Bayliss	Ducati 999 F06	25	+0.184	1	20
3	88	(Australia) Andrew Pitt	Yamaha YZF R1	25	+2.242	6	16
4	55	(France) Régis Laconi	Kawasaki ZX 10R	25	+6.523	7	13
5	52	(United Kingdom) James Toseland	Honda CBR1000RR	25	+7.073	4	11
6	1	(Australia) Troy Corser	Suzuki GSX-R1000 K6	25	+7.521	5	10
7	71	(Japan) Yukio Kagayama	Suzuki GSX-R1000 K6	25	+10.903	9	9
8	9	(United Kingdom) Chris Walker	Kawasaki ZX 10R	25	+19.715	8	8
9	4	(Brazil) Alex Barros	Honda CBR1000RR	25	+22.202	18	7
10	11	(Spain) Rubén Xaus	Ducati 999 F05	25	+26.797	13	6
11	57	(Italy) Lorenzo Lanzi	Ducati 999 F06	25	+29.702	11	5
12	84	(Italy) Michel Fabrizio	Honda CBR1000RR	25	+29.804	14	4
13	3	(Japan) Norifumi Abe	Yamaha YZF R1	25	+31.829	19	3
14	16	(France) Sébastien Gimbert	Yamaha YZF R1	25	+34.177	15	2
15	13	(Italy) Vittorio Iannuzzo	Suzuki GSX-R1000 K6	25	+35.267	23	1
16	99	(Australia) Steve Martin	Petronas FP1	25	+40.940	17	
17	38	(Japan) Shinichi Nakatomi	Yamaha YZF R1	25	+43.413	26	
18	44	(Italy) Roberto Rolfo	Ducati 999 F05	25	+45.985	25	
Ret	10	(Spain) Fonsi Nieto	Kawasaki ZX 10R	18	Retirement	12	
Ret	8	(Italy) Ivan Clementi	Ducati 999 RS	12	Retirement	21	
Ret	18	(United Kingdom) Craig Jones	Petronas FP1	12	Retirement	24	
Ret	7	(Italy) Pierfrancesco Chili	Honda CBR1000RR	11	Retirement	16	
Ret	20	(Italy) Marco Borciani	Ducati 999 F05	11	Retirement	20	
Ret	25	(Australia) Josh Brookes	Kawasaki ZX 10R	10	Retirement	22	
Ret	81	(United Kingdom) Tommy Hill	Yamaha YZF R1	5	Retirement	10	
Ret	31	(Australia) Karl Muggeridge	Honda CBR1000RR	4	Retirement	3	
Ret	80	(United States) Kurtis Roberts	Ducati 999 RS	1	Retirement	27	

=== Supersport race classification ===
Pos	No	Rider	Bike	Laps	Time	Grid	Points
1	23	(Australia) Broc Parkes	Yamaha YZF-R6	23	34:27.306	1	25
2	11	(Australia) Kevin Curtain	Yamaha YZF-R6	23	+1.758	3	20
3	54	(Turkey) Kenan Sofuoğlu	Honda CBR600RR	23	+2.088	4	16
4	127	(Denmark) Robbin Harms	Honda CBR600RR	23	+12.146	14	13
5	53	(United Kingdom) Cal Crutchlow	Honda CBR600RR	23	+12.309	6	11
6	16	(France) Sébastien Charpentier	Honda CBR600RR	23	+12.570	2	10
7	7	(France) Stéphane Chambon	Kawasaki ZX-6R	23	+15.144	5	9
8	69	(Italy) Gianluca Nannelli	Ducati 749R	23	+16.848	15	8
9	55	(Italy) Massimo Roccoli	Yamaha YZF-R6	23	+17.058	8	7
10	56	(United Kingdom) Leon Camier	Honda CBR600RR	23	+17.380	7	6
11	116	(Sweden) Johan Stigefelt	Honda CBR600RR	23	+19.834	13	5
12	32	(France) Yoann Tiberio	Honda CBR600RR	23	+20.967	9	4
13	8	(France) Maxime Berger	Kawasaki ZX-6R	23	+21.597	12	3
14	6	(Italy) Mauro Sanchini	Yamaha YZF-R6	23	+24.048	18	2
15	77	(Netherlands) Barry Veneman	Suzuki GSX-R600	23	+25.071	17	1
16	22	(Norway) Kai Børre Andersen	Suzuki GSX-R600	23	+41.099	22	
17	25	(Finland) Tatu Lauslehto	Honda CBR600RR	23	+42.438	25	
18	37	(San Marino) William De Angelis	Honda CBR600RR	23	+42.574	24	
19	18	(France) Mathieu Lagrive	Honda CBR600RR	23	+43.639	20	
20	27	(United Kingdom) Tom Tunstall	Honda CBR600RR	23	+44.224	23	
21	94	(Spain) David Checa	Yamaha YZF-R6	23	+48.154	19	
22	21	(Canada) Chris Peris	Yamaha YZF-R6	23	+56.300	27	
23	88	(France) Julien Enjolras	Yamaha YZF-R6	23	+56.802	21	
24	60	(Russia) Vladimir Ivanov	Yamaha YZF-R6	23	+1:02.305	32	
25	91	(Spain) Javier Hidalgo	Honda CBR600RR	23	+1:07.411	29	
26	5	(Italy) Alessio Velini	Yamaha YZF-R6	23	+1:08.000	31	
27	17	(Portugal) Miguel Praia	Honda CBR600RR	23	+1:19.162	33	
28	93	(France) Stephane Duterne	Yamaha YZF-R6	23	+1:21.129	30	
29	57	(Slovenia) Luka Nedog	Ducati 749R	22	+1 lap	35	
Ret	15	(Italy) Andrea Berta	Yamaha YZF-R6	16	Retirement	36	
Ret	45	(Italy) Gianluca Vizziello	Yamaha YZF-R6	14	Retirement	10	
Ret	72	(United Kingdom) Stuart Easton	Ducati 749R	2	Retirement	26	
Ret	99	(Italy) Sebastiano Zerbo	Yamaha YZF-R6	2	Retirement	34	
Ret	61	(Italy) Simone Sanna	Honda CBR600RR	1	Retirement	16	
Ret	12	(Spain) Javier Forés	Yamaha YZF-R6	0	Accident	11	
Ret	73	(Austria) Christian Zaiser	Ducati 749R	0	Retirement	28	
DNS	38	(France) Grégory Leblanc	Honda CBR600RR		Did not start		
WD	145	(Belgium) Sebastien Le Grelle	Honda CBR600RR		Withdrew		

== Superstock 1000 race classification ==
Pos.	No.	Rider	Bike	Laps	Time/Retired	Grid	Points
1	9	(Italy) Luca Scassa	MV Agusta F4 1000 R	15	22:48.907	4	25
2	53	(Italy) Alessandro Polita	Suzuki GSX-R1000 K6	15	+0.449	6	20
3	86	(Italy) Ayrton Badovini	MV Agusta F4 1000 R	15	+0.583	1	16
4	77	(Italy) Claudio Corti	Yamaha YZF-R1	15	+6.200	7	13
5	11	(Italy) Denis Sacchetti	Kawasaki ZX-10R	15	+7.829	3	11
6	16	(Spain) Enrique Rocamora	Yamaha YZF-R1	15	+7.904	11	10
7	26	(Australia) Brendan Roberts	Suzuki GSX-R1000 K6	15	+10.196	2	9
8	32	(South Africa) Sheridan Morais	Suzuki GSX-R1000 K6	15	+12.933	9	8
9	36	(Spain) Iván Silva	Kawasaki ZX-10R	15	+14.474	5	7
10	8	(France) Loïc Napoleone	Suzuki GSX-R1000 K6	15	+14.520	15	6
11	22	(United Kingdom) Guy Sanders	Kawasaki ZX-10R	15	+14.973	20	5
12	47	(United Kingdom) Richard Cooper	Honda CBR1000RR	15	+15.055	12	4
13	57	(Italy) Ilario Dionisi	MV Agusta F4 1000 R	15	+15.254	8	3
14	15	(Italy) Matteo Baiocco	Yamaha YZF-R1	15	+15.329	17	2
15	41	(Australia) Nick Henderson	Suzuki GSX-R1000 K6	15	+20.965	18	1
16	17	(France) Cédric Tangre	Suzuki GSX-R1000 K6	15	+21.982	21	
17	55	(Belgium) Olivier Depoorter	Yamaha YZF-R1	15	+26.742	23	
18	38	(Italy) Gilles Boccolini	Kawasaki ZX-10R	15	+28.759	16	
19	48	(United Kingdom) Jon Boy Lee	Yamaha YZF-R1	15	+30.167	14	
20	24	(Slovenia) Marko Jerman	Suzuki GSX-R1000 K6	15	+38.113	22	
21	21	(Netherlands) Leon Bovee	Suzuki GSX-R1000 K6	15	+40.069	24	
22	35	(Netherlands) Allard Kerkhoven	Suzuki GSX-R1000 K6	15	+43.423	27	
23	90	(Italy) Diego Ciavattini	Yamaha YZF-R1	15	+44.795	28	
24	12	(Germany) Leonardo Biliotti	MV Agusta F4 1000 R	15	+45.422	19	
25	14	(Italy) Mauro Belliero	Honda CBR1000RR	15	+49.603	33	
26	99	(Italy) Danilo Dell'Omo	Suzuki GSX-R1000 K6	15	+52.055	10	
27	89	(Switzerland) Raphael Chevre	Suzuki GSX-R1000 K6	15	+53.161	26	
28	33	(United Kingdom) Patrick McDougall	Suzuki GSX-R1000 K6	15	+59.944	31	
29	95	(Qatar) Mashel Al Naimi	Kawasaki ZX-10R	15	+1:29.224	34	
Ret	31	(Italy) Giuseppe Barone	Suzuki GSX-R1000 K6	11	Retirement	32	
Ret	64	(Belgium) Didier Heyndrickx	Suzuki GSX-R1000 K6	8	Accident	25	
Ret	10	(Italy) Giuseppe Natalini	Yamaha YZF-R1	6	Retirement	29	
Ret	34	(Republic of Ireland) Mark Pollock	Suzuki GSX-R1000 K6	5	Retirement	30m	
Ret	82	(Italy) Giuseppe Cedroni	Honda CBR1000RR	5	Accident	35	
Ret	44	(Italy) Roberto Lunadei	Yamaha YZF-R1	0	Accident	13	
DNS	96	(Czech Republic) Matěj Smrž	Honda CBR1000RR		Did not start		
DNQ	18	(Belgium) Eric Van Bael	Suzuki GSX-R1000 K6		Did not qualify		
WD	71	(Norway) Petter Solli	Yamaha YZF-R1		Withdrew		

== Superstock 600 race classification ==
Pos.	No.	Rider	Bike	Laps	Time/Retired	Grid	Points
1	19	(Belgium) Xavier Simeon	Suzuki GSX-R600	12	18:55.045	2	25
2	59	(Italy) Niccolò Canepa	Ducati 749R	12	+0.263	1	20
3	8	(Italy) Andrea Antonelli	Honda CBR600RR	12	+1.246	4	16
4	10	(Italy) Davide Giugliano	Kawasaki ZX-6R	12	+5.724	7	13
5	7	(Italy) Renato Costantini	Honda CBR600RR	12	+5.751	6	11
6	69	(Czech Republic) Ondřej Ježek	Kawasaki ZX-6R	12	+14.168	3	10
7	18	(United Kingdom) Matt Bond	Suzuki GSX-R600	12	+14.331	9	9
8	56	(Switzerland) Daniel Sutter	Honda CBR600RR	12	+14.382	10	8
9	24	(Italy) Daniele Beretta	Suzuki GSX-R600	12	+18.723	11	7
10	21	(France) Franck Millet	Yamaha YZF-R6	12	+18.783	17	6
11	30	(Switzerland) Michaël Savary	Yamaha YZF-R6	12	+19.344	14	5
12	41	(Switzerland) Gregory Junod	Suzuki GSX-R600	12	+19.680	12	4
13	16	(United Kingdom) Christopher Northover	Suzuki GSX-R600	12	+19.756	23	3
14	77	(United Kingdom) Barry Burrell	Honda CBR600RR	12	+23.153	16	2
15	44	(Italy) Cristiano Erbacci	Yamaha YZF-R6	12	+25.906	19	1
16	26	(United States) Will Gruy	Yamaha YZF-R6	12	+28.733	21	
17	37	(Poland) Andrzej Chmielewski	Yamaha YZF-R6	12	+29.027	20	
18	88	(Norway) Mads Odin Hodt	Yamaha YZF-R6	12	+29.418	15	
19	34	(Sweden) Alexander Lundh	Honda CBR600RR	12	+29.930	22	
20	55	(Belgium) Vincent Lonbois	Suzuki GSX-R600	12	+49.490	32	
21	32	(Italy) Robert Gianfardoni	Suzuki GSX-R600	12	+49.704	30	
22	60	(United Kingdom) Sam Bishop	Yamaha YZF-R6	12	+1:03.870	26	
23	28	(Spain) Yannick Guerra	Yamaha YZF-R6	12	+1:04.326	33	
24	61	(United Kingdom) Matthew Norman	Kawasaki ZX-6R	12	+1:04.612	34	
25	58	(Switzerland) Gabriel Berclaz	Yamaha YZF-R6	12	+1:13.773	29	
26	12	(Italy) Davide Caldart	Kawasaki ZX-6R	12	+1:14.048	35	
27	99	(Netherlands) Roy Ten Napel	Yamaha YZF-R6	12	+1:20.056	8	
28	31	(Netherlands) Lennart Van Houwelingen	Suzuki GSX-R600	12	+1:24.123	25	
Ret	25	(Czech Republic) Patrik Vostárek	Honda CBR600RR	4	Accident	27	
Ret	74	(France) Sylvain Barrier	Yamaha YZF-R6	2	Accident	5	
Ret	199	(United Kingdom) Gregg Black	Honda CBR600RR	1	Accident	13	
Ret	89	(Italy) Domenico Colucci	Ducati 749R	0	Accident	28	
Ret	62	(United Kingdom) Steve Smith	Yamaha YZF-R6	0	Accident	24	
Ret	33	(Italy) Alessandro Colatosti	Kawasaki ZX-6R	0	Accident	18	
DNS	79	(Brazil) Luiz Carlos	Yamaha YZF-R6	0	Did not start	31	
