= Sterilgarda =

Italian company producing dairy products

Coordinates: 46.573410°N 11.663950°E

Sterilgarda Alimenti
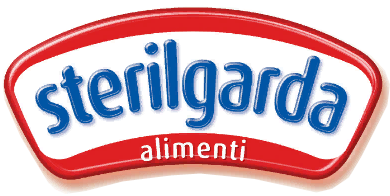
- Traded as: S.p.A.
- Industry: Dairy products
- Founded: 1969
- Headquarters: Castiglione delle Stiviere, Province of Mantua, Italy
- Area served: Italy
- Products: milk, cheese, milk-based desserts, tomato paste, beverages
- Revenue: €525.8 million (2024)
- Net income: €11.2 million (2024)
- Number of employees: 398 (2026)
- Website: sterilgarda.it

Sterilgarda Alimenti S.p.A. is an Italian dairy produce company, based in Castiglione delle Stiviere in the Province of Mantua.

== History ==
Sterilgarda was formed in 1969 by a group of local dairy farming entrepreneurs to take advantage of two new technology innovations in milk production: the development of UHT milk, and the invention of the Tetrapak container. When combined, this would allow dairies to stabilise production, allowing long-term storage of quantities of milk for when they were need to be purchased by consumers, and also extend the possible distribution chain even to where there was no daily door-step delivery.

Formed and still based in Castiglione delle Stiviere, the company started out by supplying just milk delivery companies. It quickly expanded in the 1970s to forming partnerships with retailers, and later into the foods market supplying milk and whey for the production of mascarpone cheese. Later in the decade, the company started centralised production of tomato paste, being close to the "hot-break" tomato production centres of the Casalasco farmers co-operative, located in Rivarolo del Re ed Uniti, Parma and Piacenza along the River Po valley.

With increased production in the 1980s, the company fully automated its production lines. This also allowed the company to extend into the production and packaging of fruit juices initially in consumable 200 millilitres (7.0 imp fl oz; 6.8 US fl oz) cellophane-wrapped packs for school children, and later family-sized litre-scale Tetrapak varieties. By the mid-1980s, the company had experimenting with the production of desserts, especially a type of yogurt without milk-protein, but that was only initially available locally to the dairy due to its needs of being produced in glass jars. Fruit juice production was also expanded, with specific lines for the mixing industry aimed at cocktails, particularly a refined tomato juice for creating a Bloody Mary. Cheese production had also expanded with the introduction of gorgonzola and mascarpone, and the introduction of cream cheese and cottage cheese production.

In the early 1990s, the company developed new portion-sized desserts based around a mix of UHT derived pannacotta and fruit mix, which mainly replaced the dwindling requirements from consumers for yogurt-based products.

At the start of 2000, the company introduced lactose-free milk, flavored milk and desserts with added Omega 3. With new packaging available from Tetrapak, from 2000 Sterilgarda milk was marketed as "milk with cap", which brings a large growth in UHT milk sales. In 2010, using a patented-process, Sterilgarda launched micro-filtered UHT milk, providing a product with a long ambient-temperature storage life before being used.

== Present ==
The main plant covers an indoor enclosed area of 400,000 square metres (4,300,000 sq ft) and employs 263 people, on a site capable of doubling plant size. It currently produces 1,200 tonnes (1,300 tons) of product per day, through eight product-line plants and 27 packaging lines. The separate but enclosed cheese dairy plant produces 40 tonnes (44 tons) of mascarpone and 15 tonnes (17 tons) of ricotta per day.

The company currently produces:

- 20 lines of milk and liquid product, covering: milk, juice, cream, whip cream, béchamel, sorbet base, chocolate milk, banana milk
- 20 lines for desserts, covering: yogurt, milk pudding, panna cotta
- 20 lines for cheese, covering: mascarpone, ricotta and spreadable cheese
- Tomato paste

They currently have under development new lines for the drinks market, covering cocktail mixers, energy drinks and herbal teas.

== Sports sponsorship ==
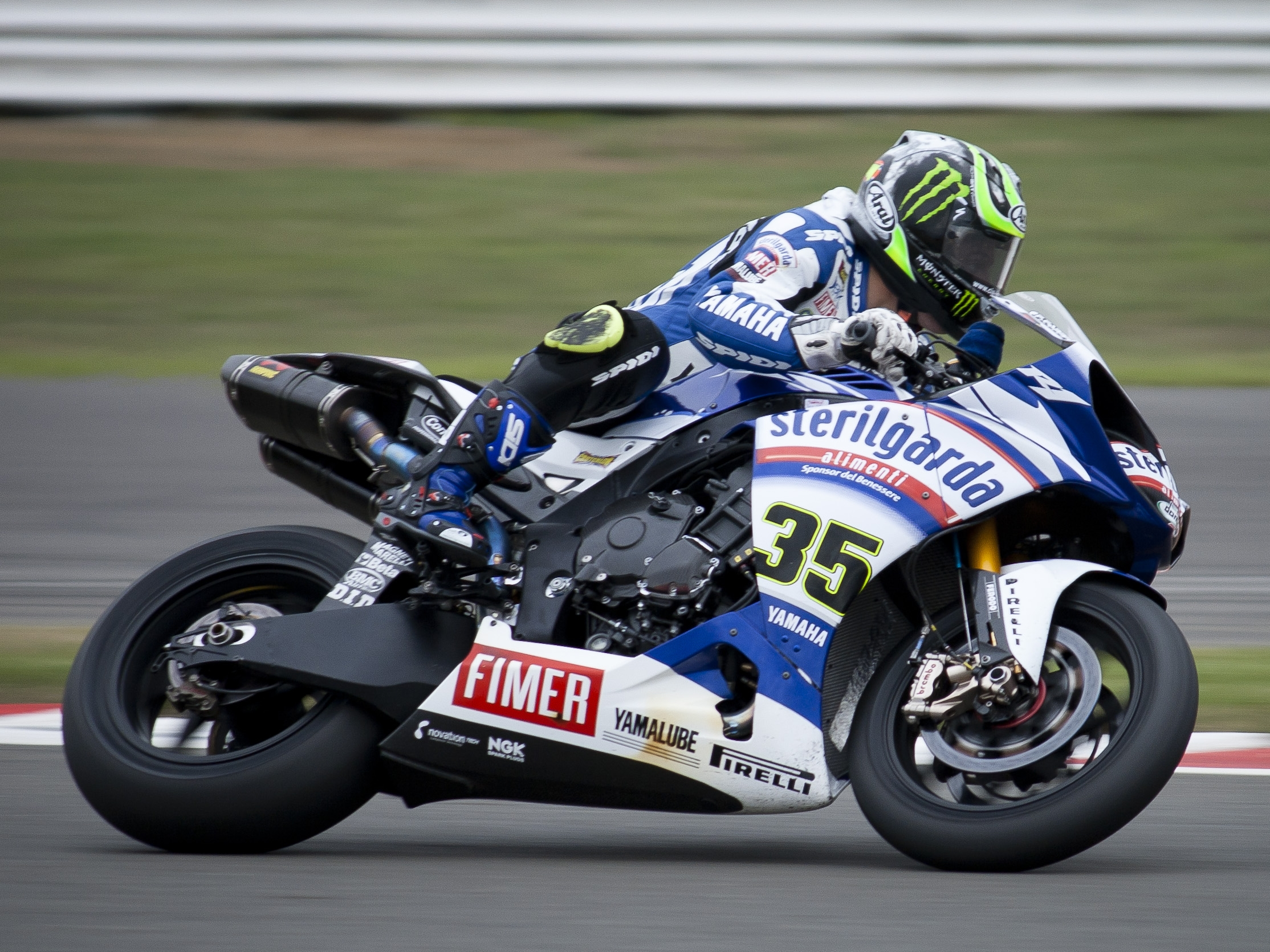
British rider Cal Crutchlow rides the winning Sterilgarda-sponsored works Yamaha YZF-R1 at Round 10 of the 2010 Superbike World Championship at Silverstone, England, July 2010.

The company has been a long-term sponsor of local football club F.C. Castiglione, that in the summer of 2010 the club changed its name to "F.C. Sterilgarda Castiglione A.S.D.".

From 2004 to 2011, the company were active in motorcycle racing sponsorship, mainly supporting World Superbike Championship teams with Italian riders. This started in the 2004 season, when the company sponsored the privateer DFX team who hence chose Marco Borciani to ride their Ducati 998RS. This continued until 2010, when they became main-sponsor of the Yamaha factory teams YZF-R1's. After Yamaha decided to pull out of WSB at the end of the 2011 season, Sterilgarda also confirmed that they would stop sponsoring teams in WSB. Max Biaggi, who rode for the Alitalia-sponsored Aprilia WSB team, is the current main personal-sponsored rider and face of marketing of Sterilgarda in Italy.

Starting in 2019 Sterilgarda became the main sponsor of Max Biaggi's Moto3 Team, Max Racing.

For 2025, Sterilgarda is sponsoring the GP program of the Italian motorcycle manufacturer Aprilia. The riders for 2025 include MARCO BEZZECCHI and world champion JORGE MARTÍN ALMOGUERA.
