= Ducati 999 =

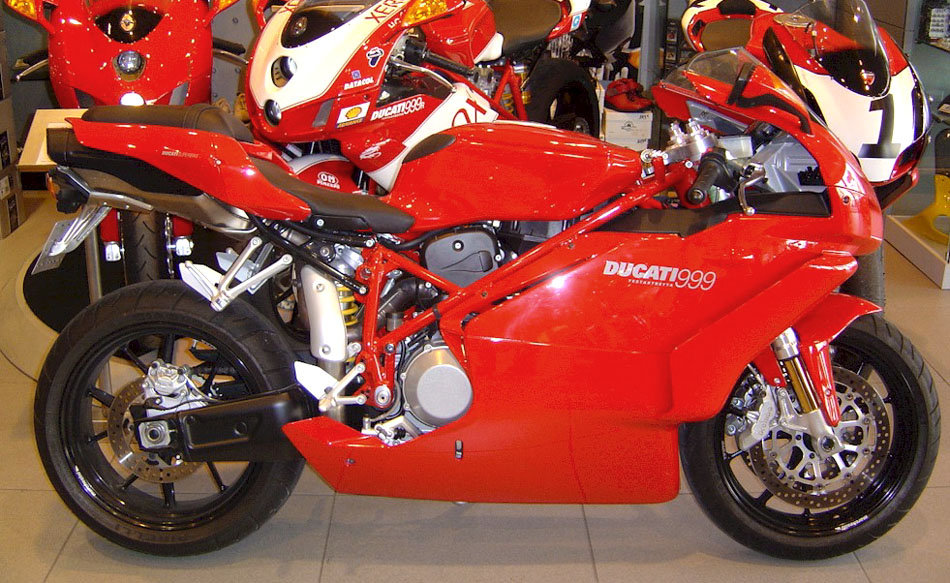
- Manufacturer: Ducati
- Also called: "Nine-nine-nine" and "Triple nine"
- Parent company: Ducati Motor Holdings, SpA
- Production: 2003–2006
- Predecessor: Ducati 998
- Successor: Ducati 1098
- Class: Sport bike
- Engine: 998—999 cc, liquid cooled, four stroke, 90° L-twin DOHC, 4 desmodromic valves per cylinder
- Bore / stroke: 998 cc: 100 mm x 63.5 mm 999 cc: 104 mm x 58.8 mm (999R)
- Transmission: 6-speed constant-mesh sequential manual
- Related: Ducati 749

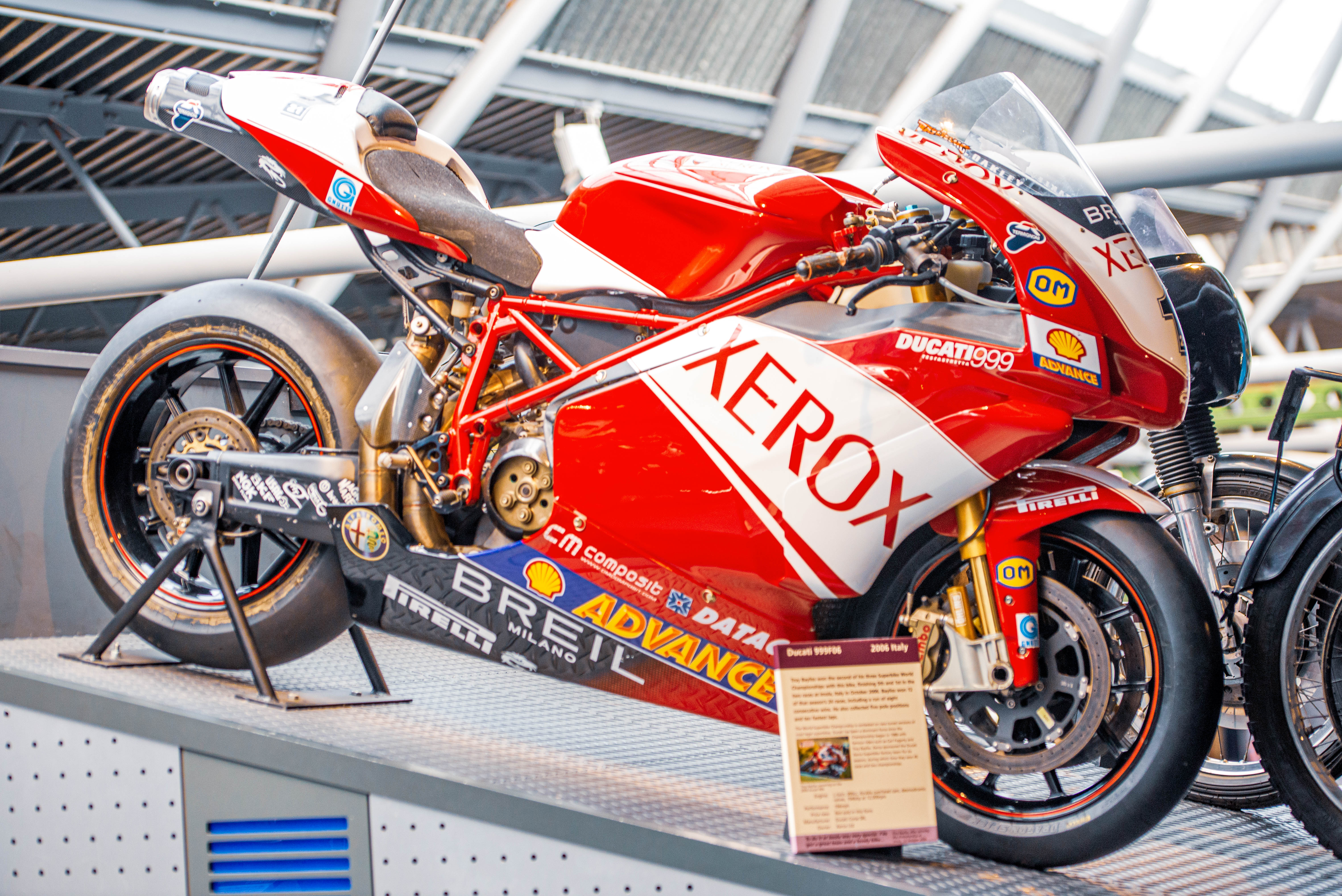
2006 Ducati 999R Xerox

The Ducati 999 is a sport bike made by Ducati from 2003 to 2006. It superseded the Massimo Tamburini designed Ducati 916, Ducati 996 and Ducati 998 range of superbikes. This motorcycle enjoyed great success in World Superbike, and was raced in the series through the 2007 season, despite no longer being produced, pending rules changes by the series' governing body, FIM, to allow competition of the new Ducati 1098.

The 999 was designed by Pierre Terblanche, amid much controversy over its styling. It is known as a high performance, race oriented motorcycle. With its traditional Ducati L Twin Desmodromic Valve actuated engine layout, it has a linear power delivery, with high power and torque figures available even at low RPM. Additionally, with its high spec suspension and trellis chassis, it is one of the finest handling motorcycles for its time. The most beloved are the later model Monoposto with SBK rear trailing arm.

Subsequently, more powerful 999S and 999R versions were introduced, both capable of 0-62 mph (0-100 km/h) in under three seconds; and a top speed of over 170 mph (270 km/h).

The 2005 Ducati 999S won the Maxisport category for the prestigious international Masterbike 2005 comparison and finished second overall. It has received critical acclaim from many corners, such as MCN of the U.K. which called it "simply the best V-Twin on the planet", and Motorbikestoday.com, which described it as "the most desirable, most exciting roadbike on the planet" in 2004. MotorcycleUSA.com described it as "stupendous" and "the epitome of V-Twin power." Also known as "the F1 of the motorcycles" in 2005.

== Racing ==
From the start the 999 was very successful in the Superbike World Championship, winning world championships in:

- 2003 Neil Hodgson
- 2004 James Toseland
- 2006 Troy Bayliss

Gregorio Lavilla also won the 2005 British Superbike Championship on a 999 F04.

== Specifications ==
	999 (2003)	999 (2006)	999S (2006)	999R (2006)	999R Xerox (2006)
Engine	L-twin cylinder, 4 valves per cylinder Testastretta Desmodromic; liquid cooled				
Displacement	997.46 cc			999 cc	
Bore x Stroke	100.0 mm × 63.5 mm (3.9 in × 2.5 in); 498.73 cc			104.0 mm × 58.8 mm (4.1 in × 2.3 in); 499.5 cc	
Compression Ratio	11.4:1			12.5;1	
Power	91 kW (124 PS; 122 hp) @ 9,750 pm	103 kW (140 PS; 138 hp) @ 9,750 pm	105.2 kW (143 PS; 141 hp) @ 9,750 rpm	110 kW (150 PS; 148 hp) @ 9,750 rpm	
Torque	10.4 kg⋅m (102.0 N⋅m; 75.2 lb⋅ft) @ 8,000 rpm	11.1 kg⋅m (108.9 N⋅m; 80.3 lb⋅ft) @ 8,000 rpm	11.4 kg⋅m (111.8 N⋅m; 82.5 lb⋅ft) @ 8,000 rpm	11.9 kg⋅m (116.7 N⋅m; 86.1 lb⋅ft) @ 8,000 rpm	
Fuel injection	Marelli electronic fuel injection, 54 mm throttle body				
Exhaust	Single steel exhaust with catalytic converter				
Emissions	Euro2				
Gearbox	6-speed constant-mesh sequential manual				
Ratios	1st 37/15, 2nd 30/17, 3rd 28/20, 4th 26/22, 5th 24/23, 6th 23/24				
Primary drive	Straight cut gears; ratio 1.84				
Final drive	Chain; Front sprocket 15; Rear sprocket 36				
Clutch	Dry multiplate with hydraulic control				
Frame	Tubular steel trellis				
Wheelbase	1420 mm / 55.9 in				
Rake	23.5° - 24.5°				
Front suspension	Showa 43 mm upside-down fully adjustable fork with TiN surface treatment		Öhlins 43 mm upside-down fully adjustable fork, with TiN surface treatment, for radial calipers		
Front wheel travel	125 mm / 4.9 in		120 mm / 4.7 in		
Front brake	2 x 320 mm semi-floating discs, 4-piston 4-pad caliper		2 x 320 mm semi-floating discs, 4-piston 4-pad radial caliper		
Front wheel	Y-shaped 5-spoke light alloy 3.50 x 17			Y-shaped 5-spoke light alloy forged 3.50 x 17	
Front tyre	120/70 ZR 17				
Rear suspension	Progressive linkage with fully adjustable Öhlins monoshock				
Rear wheel travel	128 mm / 5 in				
Rear brake	240 mm disc, 2-piston caliper				
Rear wheel	Y-shaped 5-spoke light alloy 5.50 x 17			Y-shaped 5-spoke light alloy forged 5.50 x 17	
Rear tyre	190/50 ZR 17				
Fuel tank capacity	15.5 L (3.4 imp gal; 4.1 US gal) (includes 3 L reserve)				
Weight (Note: The weight excludes battery, lubricants and, where applicable, cooling liquid.)	199 kg / 439 lbs		186 kg / 410 lbs		181 kg / 399 lbs
Seat height	780 mm / 30.7 in				
Versions	Dual seat		Single seat Dual seat (Note: dual seat not available in North America.)	Single seat	

== Reviews ==
A 2003 road test review in Newsweek said the Ducati 999 resembled "a red Pegasus on wheels", praising is stylishness as well as its "sheer velocity". A 2013 review in Motorcyclist commended the sportbike's handling, saying "The front wheel sticks to the road like perfectly cooked pasta to a wall, and the four-pad Brembos are strong enough to slam your eyeballs against in the inside of your faceshield."
