= Arie Vos =

Dutch motorcycle racer

- Nationality: Dutch
- Born: 12 February 1976 (age 50)
Motorcycle racing career statistics
250cc World Championship
Active years	2003
Manufacturers	Yamaha
Championships	0
2003 championship position	NC (0 pts)
Starts / Wins / Podiums / Poles / F. laps / Points; 2 / 0 / 0 / 0 / 0 / 0
Superbike World Championship
Active years	2008
Manufacturers	Ducati
Championships	0
2008 championship position	NC (0 pts)
Starts / Wins / Podiums / Poles / F. laps / Points; 2 / 0 / 0 / 0 / 0 / 0
Supersport World Championship
Active years	2004–2007, 2009
Manufacturers	Kawasaki, Yamaha, Honda
Championships	0
2009 championship position	32nd (3 pts)
Starts / Wins / Podiums / Poles / F. laps / Points; 25 / 0 / 0 / 0 / 0 / 42

Arie Vos (born 12 February 1976) is a Dutch former motorcycle racer. Vos started his motorcyle racing career in 1998 and retired after the 2014 season. He has competed in the Supersport World Championship from 2004 to 2007 and in 2009, with a best finish of fifth at Assen in 2006.

== Career statistics ==
=== Grand Prix motorcycle racing ===
==== Races by year ====
(key) (Races in bold indicate pole position) (Races in italics indicate fastest lap)

Year	Class	Bike	1	2	3	4	5	6	7	8	9	10	11	12	13	14	15	16	Pos	Pts
2003	250cc	Yamaha	JPN	RSA	SPA	FRA	ITA	CAT	NED; 21	GBR	GER	CZE; 21	POR	BRA	PAC	MAL	AUS	VAL	NC	0

=== Supersport World Championship ===
==== Races by year ====
(key) (Races in bold indicate pole position) (Races in italics indicate fastest lap)

Year	Bike	1	2	3	4	5	6	7	8	9	10	11	12	13	14	Pos	Pts
2004	Kawasaki	SPA	AUS	SMR	ITA	GER	GBR	GBR	NED; 8	ITA	FRA					29th	8
2005	Yamaha	QAT	AUS	SPA	ITA	EUR	SMR; 18	CZE; 21	GBR; 19							18th	17
2005	Honda									NED; 13	GER	ITA; 7	FRA; 11			18th	17
2006	Honda	QAT	AUS	SPA	ITA	EUR	SMR; 14	CZE	GBR	NED; 5	GER	ITA	FRA; 19			28th	13
2007	Honda	QAT	AUS	EUR	SPA	NED; 15	ITA	GBR	SMR	CZE	GBR	GER	ITA	FRA		42nd	1
2009	Honda	AUS; 22	QAT; 17	SPA; 17	NED; 16	ITA; 20	RSA; 19	USA; 18	SMR; 14	GBR; 16	CZE; 17	GER; 21	ITA; 16	FRA; 15	POR; Ret	32nd	3

=== Superbike World Championship ===
==== Races by year ====
(key) (Races in bold indicate pole position) (Races in italics indicate fastest lap)

Year	Bike	1		2		3		4		5		6		7		8		9		10		11		12		13		14		Pos	Pts
Year	Bike	R1	R2	R1	R2	R1	R2	R1	R2	R1	R2	R1	R2	R1	R2	R1	R2	R1	R2	R1	R2	R1	R2	R1	R2	R1	R2	R1	R2	Pos	Pts
2008	Ducati	QAT	QAT	AUS	AUS	SPA	SPA	NED; 20	NED; 23	ITA	ITA	USA	USA	GER	GER	SMR	SMR	CZE	CZE	GBR	GBR	EUR	EUR	ITA	ITA	FRA	FRA	POR	POR	NC	0
