= 2006 Phillip Island Superbike World Championship round =

(Australia) 2006 Phillip Island Superbike World Championship round
Round details
- Round 2 of 12 rounds in the 2006 Superbike World Championship. and Round 2 of 12 rounds in the 2006 Supersport World Championship.
- Date: 5 March, 2006
- Location: Phillip Island
- Course: Permanent racing facility 4.445 km (2.762 mi)

Superbike World Championship
Pole position
(Australia) Troy Bayliss
1:32.159
Fastest lap race 1	Fastest lap race 2
(Australia) Troy Bayliss	(Australia) Troy Bayliss
1:32.402	1:32.983

Supersport World Championship
Pole position
(France) Sébastien Charpentier
1:35.616
Fastest lap
(Australia) Broc Parkes
1:36.399

The 2006 Phillip Island Superbike World Championship round was the second round of the 2006 Superbike World Championship. It took place over the weekend of 3–5 March 2006 at the Phillip Island Grand Prix Circuit near Cowes, Victoria, Australia.

== Results ==
=== Superbike race 1 classification ===
Pos	No	Rider	Bike	Laps	Time	Grid	Points
1	1	(Australia) Troy Corser	Suzuki GSX-R1000 K6	22	34:33.545	2	25
2	4	(Brazil) Alex Barros	Honda CBR1000RR	22	+0.450	5	20
3	52	(United Kingdom) James Toseland	Honda CBR1000RR	22	+7.974	3	16
4	41	(Japan) Noriyuki Haga	Yamaha YZF R1	22	+15.121	8	13
5	44	(Italy) Roberto Rolfo	Ducati 999 F05	22	+16.292	15	11
6	21	(Australia) Troy Bayliss	Ducati 999 F06	22	+17.120	1	10
7	11	(Spain) Rubén Xaus	Ducati 999 F05	22	+17.192	22	9
8	10	(Spain) Fonsi Nieto	Kawasaki ZX 10R	22	+22.457	13	8
9	88	(Australia) Andrew Pitt	Yamaha YZF R1	22	+22.490	7	7
10	9	(United Kingdom) Chris Walker	Kawasaki ZX 10R	22	+23.176	10	6
11	57	(Italy) Lorenzo Lanzi	Ducati 999 F06	22	+28.347	9	5
12	71	(Japan) Yukio Kagayama	Suzuki GSX-R1000 K6	22	+28.413	12	4
13	55	(France) Régis Laconi	Kawasaki ZX 10R	22	+28.833	14	3
14	99	(Australia) Steve Martin	Petronas FP1	22	+28.977	4	2
15	84	(Italy) Michel Fabrizio	Honda CBR1000RR	22	+29.122	20	1
16	7	(Italy) Pierfrancesco Chili	Honda CBR1000RR	22	+30.825	11	
17	3	(Japan) Norifumi Abe	Yamaha YZF R1	22	+30.955	17	
18	76	(Germany) Max Neukirchner	Ducati 999 RS	22	+35.417	19	
19	8	(Italy) Ivan Clementi	Ducati 999 RS	22	+46.919	16	
20	116	(Italy) Franco Battaini	Kawasaki ZX 10R	22	+1:08.373	25	
Ret	38	(Japan) Shinichi Nakatomi	Yamaha YZF R1	16	Accident	24	
Ret	31	(Australia) Karl Muggeridge	Honda CBR1000RR	15	Retirement	6	
Ret	15	(France) Fabien Foret	Suzuki GSX-R1000 K6	12	Retirement	18	
Ret	18	(United Kingdom) Craig Jones	Petronas FP1	10	Accident	26	
Ret	13	(Italy) Vittorio Iannuzzo	Suzuki GSX-R1000 K6	9	Accident	28	
Ret	20	(Italy) Marco Borciani	Ducati 999 F05	8	Retirement	23	
Ret	16	(France) Sébastien Gimbert	Yamaha YZF R1	4	Retirement	21	
Ret	19	(Italy) Lucio Pedercini	Ducati 999 RS	3	Retirement	27	

=== Superbike race 2 classification ===
Pos	No	Rider	Bike	Laps	Time	Grid	Points
1	21	(Australia) Troy Bayliss	Ducati 999 F06	22	34:33.803	1	25
2	52	(United Kingdom) James Toseland	Honda CBR1000RR	22	+5.528	3	20
3	4	(Brazil) Alex Barros	Honda CBR1000RR	22	+14.312	5	16
4	41	(Japan) Noriyuki Haga	Yamaha YZF R1	22	+16.208	8	13
5	88	(Australia) Andrew Pitt	Yamaha YZF R1	22	+17.656	7	11
6	71	(Japan) Yukio Kagayama	Suzuki GSX-R1000 K6	22	+20.832	12	10
7	44	(Italy) Roberto Rolfo	Ducati 999 F05	22	+21.130	15	9
8	11	(Spain) Rubén Xaus	Ducati 999 F05	22	+25.224	22	8
9	10	(Spain) Fonsi Nieto	Kawasaki ZX 10R	22	+25.638	13	7
10	9	(United Kingdom) Chris Walker	Kawasaki ZX 10R	22	+26.007	10	6
11	84	(Italy) Michel Fabrizio	Honda CBR1000RR	22	+32.867	20	5
12	3	(Japan) Norifumi Abe	Yamaha YZF R1	22	+33.171	17	4
13	76	(Germany) Max Neukirchner	Ducati 999 RS	22	+33.211	19	3
14	7	(Italy) Pierfrancesco Chili	Honda CBR1000RR	22	+34.314	11	2
15	99	(Australia) Steve Martin	Petronas FP1	22	+34.467	4	1
16	55	(France) Régis Laconi	Kawasaki ZX 10R	22	+35.549	14	
17	8	(Italy) Ivan Clementi	Ducati 999 RS	22	+35.976	16	
18	15	(France) Fabien Foret	Suzuki GSX-R1000 K6	22	+49.037	18	
19	38	(Japan) Shinichi Nakatomi	Yamaha YZF R1	22	+49.120	24	
20	16	(France) Sébastien Gimbert	Yamaha YZF R1	22	+49.214	21	
21	18	(United Kingdom) Craig Jones	Petronas FP1	22	+1:20.378	26	
22	116	(Italy) Franco Battaini	Kawasaki ZX 10R	22	+1:22.805	25	
Ret	31	(Australia) Karl Muggeridge	Honda CBR1000RR	9	Accident	6	
Ret	57	(Italy) Lorenzo Lanzi	Ducati 999 F06	9	Accident	9	
Ret	20	(Italy) Marco Borciani	Ducati 999 F05	9	Retirement	23	
Ret	13	(Italy) Vittorio Iannuzzo	Suzuki GSX-R1000 K6	6	Retirement	28	
Ret	19	(Italy) Lucio Pedercini	Ducati 999 RS	4	Retirement	27	
Ret	1	(Australia) Troy Corser	Suzuki GSX-R1000 K6	3	Accident	2	

=== Supersport race classification ===
Pos	No	Rider	Bike	Laps	Time	Grid	Points
1	16	(France) Sébastien Charpentier	Honda CBR600RR	21	34:01.822	1	25
2	11	(Australia) Kevin Curtain	Yamaha YZF-R6	21	+1.361	2	20
3	23	(Australia) Broc Parkes	Yamaha YZF-R6	21	+7.796	3	16
4	32	(France) Yoann Tiberio	Honda CBR600RR	21	+16.788	8	13
5	127	(Denmark) Robbin Harms	Honda CBR600RR	21	+16.798	4	11
6	75	(Australia) Josh Brookes	Ducati 749R	21	+21.250	13	10
7	116	(Sweden) Johan Stigefelt	Honda CBR600RR	21	+21.344	10	9
8	19	(Australia) Dean Thomas	Kawasaki ZX-6R	21	+26.309	14	8
9	73	(Austria) Christian Zaiser	Ducati 749R	21	+26.473	5	7
10	55	(Italy) Massimo Roccoli	Yamaha YZF-R6	21	+26.515	21	6
11	145	(Belgium) Sébastien Le Grelle	Honda CBR600RR	21	+29.839	18	5
12	6	(Italy) Mauro Sanchini	Yamaha YZF-R6	21	+34.988	16	4
13	45	(Italy) Gianluca Vizziello	Yamaha YZF-R6	21	+36.328	24	3
14	34	(Belgium) Didier Van Keymeulen	Yamaha YZF-R6	21	+37.402	19	2
15	12	(Spain) Javier Forés	Yamaha YZF-R6	21	+38.574	17	1
16	37	(San Marino) William de Angelis	Honda CBR600RR	21	+48.703	22	
17	38	(France) Grégory Leblanc	Honda CBR600RR	21	+49.793	23	
18	27	(United Kingdom) Tom Tunstall	Honda CBR600RR	21	+59.051	26	
19	60	(Russia) Vladimir Ivanov	Yamaha YZF-R6	21	+1:15.849	27	
20	21	(Canada) Chris Peris	Yamaha YZF-R6	21	+1:23.477	25	
21	68	(Spain) David Forner García	Yamaha YZF-R6	21	+1:29.998	30	
Ret	77	(Netherlands) Barry Veneman	Suzuki GSX-R600	18	Retirement	11	
Ret	58	(Czech Republic) Tomáš Mikšovský	Honda CBR600RR	12	Accident	28	
Ret	5	(Italy) Alessio Velini	Yamaha YZF-R6	12	Retirement	31	
Ret	54	(Turkey) Kenan Sofuoğlu	Honda CBR600RR	11	Retirement	6	
Ret	49	(Australia) Anthony Gobert	Yamaha YZF-R6	11	Retirement	7	
Ret	57	(Slovenia) Luka Nedog	Ducati 749R	11	Accident	32	
Ret	25	(Finland) Tatu Lausletho	Honda CBR600RR	7	Retirement	12	
Ret	8	(France) Maxime Berger	Kawasaki ZX-6R	7	Accident	9	
Ret	69	(Italy) Gianluca Nannelli	Yamaha YZF-R6	5	Retirement	20	
Ret	22	(Norway) Kai Børre Andersen	Suzuki GSX-R600	0	Accident	15	
Ret	15	(Italy) Andrea Berta	Yamaha YZF-R6	0	Retirement	33	
Ret	88	(France) Julien Enjolras	Yamaha YZF-R6	0	Retirement	29	
