= 2006 Losail Superbike World Championship round =

(Qatar) 2006 Losail Superbike World Championship round
Round details
- Round 1 of 12 rounds in the 2006 Superbike World Championship. and Round 1 of 12 rounds in the 2006 Supersport World Championship.
- Date: February 25, 2006
- Location: Losail Circuit
- Course: Permanent racing facility 5.380 km (3.343 mi)

Superbike World Championship
Pole position
(Australia) Troy Bayliss
1:59.696
Fastest lap race 1	Fastest lap race 2
(Italy) Lorenzo Lanzi	(Japan) Noriyuki Haga
2:00.449	2:00.061

Supersport World Championship
Pole position
(France) Sébastien Charpentier
2:03.093
Fastest lap
(France) Sébastien Charpentier
2:03.921

The 2006 Losail Superbike World Championship round was the first round of the 2006 Superbike World Championship. It took place on the weekend of February 23–25, 2006 at the Losail International Circuit in Qatar.

== Results ==
=== Superbike race 1 classification ===
Pos	No	Rider	Bike	Laps	Time	Grid	Points
1	52	(United Kingdom) James Toseland	Honda CBR1000RR	18	36:31.339	4	25
2	21	(Australia) Troy Bayliss	Ducati 999 F06	18	+0.088	1	20
3	88	(Australia) Andrew Pitt	Yamaha YZF R1	18	+2.390	3	16
4	1	(Australia) Troy Corser	Suzuki GSX-R1000 K6	18	+2.599	5	13
5	84	(Italy) Michel Fabrizio	Honda CBR1000RR	18	+6.999	15	11
6	4	(Brazil) Alex Barros	Honda CBR1000RR	18	+14.717	10	10
7	44	(Italy) Roberto Rolfo	Ducati 999 F05	18	+15.224	11	9
8	7	(Italy) Pierfrancesco Chili	Honda CBR1000RR	18	+21.183	14	8
9	20	(Italy) Marco Borciani	Ducati 999 F05	18	+22.450	16	7
10	76	(Germany) Max Neukirchner	Ducati 999 RS	18	+23.932	20	6
11	3	(Japan) Norifumi Abe	Yamaha YZF R1	18	+24.816	19	5
12	31	(Australia) Karl Muggeridge	Honda CBR1000RR	18	+25.643	8	4
13	55	(France) Régis Laconi	Kawasaki ZX 10R	18	+29.139	17	3
14	16	(France) Sébastien Gimbert	Yamaha YZF R1	18	+29.977	18	2
15	11	(Spain) Rubén Xaus	Ducati 999 F05	18	+36.675	21	1
16	38	(Japan) Shinichi Nakatomi	Yamaha YZF R1	18	+37.495	24	
17	13	(Italy) Vittorio Iannuzzo	Suzuki GSX-R1000 K6	18	+1:06.454	26	
18	99	(Australia) Steve Martin	Petronas FP1	18	+1:06.594	9	
19	116	(Italy) Franco Battaini	Kawasaki ZX 10R	18	+1:11.802	27	
20	19	(Italy) Lucio Pedercini	Ducati 999 RS	18	+1:43.080	23	
21	95	(Qatar) Talal Al Naimi	Yamaha YZF R1	17	+1 lap	29	
Ret	71	(Japan) Yukio Kagayama	Suzuki GSX-R1000 K6	17	Accident	7	
Ret	41	(Japan) Noriyuki Haga	Yamaha YZF R1	17	Accident	6	
Ret	10	(Spain) Fonsi Nieto	Kawasaki ZX 10R	9	Retirement	13	
Ret	9	(United Kingdom) Chris Walker	Kawasaki ZX 10R	7	Retirement	12	
Ret	15	(France) Fabien Foret	Suzuki GSX-R1000 K6	6	Retirement	25	
Ret	8	(Italy) Ivan Clementi	Ducati 999 RS	4	Retirement	22	
Ret	57	(Italy) Lorenzo Lanzi	Ducati 999 F06	3	Accident	2	
Ret	18	(United Kingdom) Craig Jones	Petronas FP1	0	Accident	28	

=== Superbike race 2 classification ===
Pos	No	Rider	Bike	Laps	Time	Grid	Points
1	1	(Australia) Troy Corser	Suzuki GSX-R1000 K6	18	36:20.395	5	25
2	21	(Australia) Troy Bayliss	Ducati 999 F06	18	+1.025	1	20
3	41	(Japan) Noriyuki Haga	Yamaha YZF R1	18	+3.462	6	16
4	52	(United Kingdom) James Toseland	Honda CBR1000RR	18	+3.463	4	13
5	88	(Australia) Andrew Pitt	Yamaha YZF R1	18	+4.350	3	11
6	57	(Italy) Lorenzo Lanzi	Ducati 999 F06	18	+19.610	2	10
7	4	(Brazil) Alex Barros	Honda CBR1000RR	18	+20.548	10	9
8	84	(Italy) Michel Fabrizio	Honda CBR1000RR	18	+21.183	15	8
9	31	(Australia) Karl Muggeridge	Honda CBR1000RR	18	+23.198	8	7
10	11	(Spain) Rubén Xaus	Ducati 999 F05	18	+26.533	21	6
11	3	(Japan) Norifumi Abe	Yamaha YZF R1	18	+26.854	19	5
12	10	(Spain) Fonsi Nieto	Kawasaki ZX 10R	18	+28.132	13	4
13	44	(Italy) Roberto Rolfo	Ducati 999 F05	18	+28.135	11	3
14	20	(Italy) Marco Borciani	Ducati 999 F05	18	+34.176	16	2
15	16	(France) Sébastien Gimbert	Yamaha YZF R1	18	+35.395	18	1
16	9	(United Kingdom) Chris Walker	Kawasaki ZX 10R	18	+42.158	12	
17	38	(Japan) Shinichi Nakatomi	Yamaha YZF R1	18	+50.906	24	
18	99	(Australia) Steve Martin	Petronas FP1	18	+51.504	9	
19	8	(Italy) Ivan Clementi	Ducati 999 RS	18	+1:00.943	22	
20	116	(Italy) Franco Battaini	Kawasaki ZX 10R	18	+1:01.456	27	
21	95	(Qatar) Talal Al Naimi	Yamaha YZF R1	17	+1 lap	29	
Ret	7	(Italy) Pierfrancesco Chili	Honda CBR1000RR	10	Accident	14	
Ret	71	(Japan) Yukio Kagayama	Suzuki GSX-R1000 K6	9	Retirement	7	
Ret	76	(Germany) Max Neukirchner	Ducati 999 RS	8	Accident	20	
Ret	18	(United Kingdom) Craig Jones	Petronas FP1	6	Accident	28	
Ret	19	(Italy) Lucio Pedercini	Ducati 999 RS	4	Retirement	23	
Ret	55	(France) Régis Laconi	Kawasaki ZX 10R	2	Accident	17	
Ret	15	(France) Fabien Foret	Suzuki GSX-R1000 K6	1	Retirement	25	
Ret	13	(Italy) Vittorio Iannuzzo	Suzuki GSX-R1000 K6	1	Retirement	26	

=== Supersport race classification ===
Pos	No	Rider	Bike	Laps	Time	Grid	Points
1	16	(France) Sébastien Charpentier	Honda CBR600RR	18	37:30.955	1	25
2	11	(Australia) Kevin Curtain	Yamaha YZF-R6	18	+5.396	3	20
3	54	(Turkey) Kenan Sofuoğlu	Honda CBR600RR	18	+11.657	2	16
4	12	(Spain) Javier Forés	Yamaha YZF-R6	18	+38.142	6	13
5	116	(Sweden) Johan Stigefelt	Honda CBR600RR	18	+39.168	21	11
6	127	(Denmark) Robbin Harms	Honda CBR600RR	18	+45.547	19	10
7	55	(Italy) Massimo Roccoli	Yamaha YZF-R6	18	+47.631	16	9
8	73	(Austria) Christian Zaiser	Ducati 749R	18	+47.682	11	8
9	45	(Italy) Gianluca Vizziello	Yamaha YZF-R6	18	+48.575	13	7
10	75	(Australia) Josh Brookes	Ducati 749R	18	+49.814	25	6
11	145	(Belgium) Sébastien Le Grelle	Honda CBR600RR	18	+54.509	20	5
12	49	(Australia) Anthony Gobert	Yamaha YZF-R6	18	+54.702	17	4
13	37	(San Marino) William de Angelis	Honda CBR600RR	18	+57.362	14	3
14	27	(United Kingdom) Tom Tunstall	Honda CBR600RR	18	+1:03.436	23	2
15	69	(Italy) Gianluca Nannelli	Yamaha YZF-R6	18	+1:05.482	9	1
16	34	(Belgium) Didier Van Keymeulen	Yamaha YZF-R6	18	+1:07.541	26	
17	58	(Czech Republic) Tomáš Mikšovský	Honda CBR600RR	18	+1:14.308	22	
18	21	(Canada) Chris Peris	Yamaha YZF-R6	18	+1:14.340	15	
19	6	(Italy) Mauro Sanchini	Yamaha YZF-R6	18	+1:14.556	12	
20	60	(Russia) Vladimir Ivanov	Yamaha YZF-R6	18	+1:14.876	30	
21	5	(Italy) Alessio Velini	Yamaha YZF-R6	18	+1:44.747	28	
22	68	(Spain) David Forner García	Yamaha YZF-R6	18	+1:46.385	29	
23	88	(France) Julien Enjolras	Yamaha YZF-R6	18	+1:46.500	31	
24	25	(Finland) Tatu Lausletho	Honda CBR600RR	17	+1 lap	27	
25	77	(Netherlands) Barry Veneman	Suzuki GSX-R600	17	+1 lap	10	
Ret	19	(Australia) Dean Thomas	Kawasaki ZX-6R	16	Retirement	18	
Ret	22	(Norway) Kai Børre Andersen	Suzuki GSX-R600	16	Retirement	7	
Ret	57	(Slovenia) Luka Nedog	Ducati 749R	14	Retirement	33	
Ret	15	(Italy) Andrea Berta	Yamaha YZF-R6	13	Retirement	32	
Ret	8	(France) Maxime Berger	Kawasaki ZX-6R	7	Retirement	8	
Ret	3	(Japan) Katsuaki Fujiwara	Honda CBR600RR	4	Accident	4	
Ret	23	(Australia) Broc Parkes	Yamaha YZF-R6	1	Accident	5	
Ret	38	(France) Grégory Leblanc	Honda CBR600RR	0	Retirement	24	
