= Michal Filla =

Czech motorcycle racer

- Nationality: Czech
- Born: 11 October 1981 (age 45); Brno, Czechoslovakia
Motorcycle racing career statistics
250cc World Championship
Active years	2003, 2005–2006
Manufacturers	Yamaha, Aprilia
Starts / Wins / Podiums / Poles / F. laps / Points; 3 / 0 / 0 / 0 / 0 / 0
Supersport World Championship
Active years	2007
Manufacturers	Yamaha, Honda
Starts / Wins / Podiums / Poles / F. laps / Points; 2 / 0 / 0 / 0 / 0 / 0

Michal Filla (born 11 October 1981) is a Czech motorcycle racer.

== Career statistics ==
=== Grand Prix motorcycle racing ===
==== By season ====
Season	Class	Motorcycle	Team	Race	Win	Podium	Pole	FLap	Pts	Plcd
2003	250cc	Yamaha	TMK AMK Brno Racing Team	1	0	0	0	0	0	NC
2005	250cc	Aprilia	Sramek Racing Promotion	1	0	0	0	0	0	NC
2006	250cc	Yamaha	Sramek Racing Promotion	1	0	0	0	0	0	NC
Total				3	0	0	0	0	0	

==== Races by year ====
(key)

Year	Class	Bike	1	2	3	4	5	6	7	8	9	10	11	12	13	14	15	16	Pos.	Pts
2003	250cc	Yamaha	JPN	RSA	SPA	FRA	ITA	CAT	NED	GBR	GER	CZE; 19	POR	BRA	PAC	MAL	AUS	VAL	NC	0
2005	250cc	Aprilia	SPA	POR	CHN	FRA	ITA	CAT	NED	GBR	GER	CZE; 22	JPN	MAL	QAT	AUS	TUR	VAL	NC	0
2006	250cc	Yamaha	SPA	QAT	TUR	CHN	FRA	ITA	CAT	NED	GBR	GER	CZE; Ret	MAL	AUS	JPN	POR	VAL	NC	0

=== Supersport World Championship ===
==== Races by year ====
(key)

Year	Bike	1	2	3	4	5	6	7	8	9	10	11	12	13	Pos.	Pts
2007	Yamaha	QAT	AUS	EUR	SPA	NED	ITA	GBR	SMR	CZE; 23	GBR	GER			NC	0
2007	Honda												ITA; 21	FRA	NC	0
