= 2007 Supersport World Championship =

Sport championship

2007 Supersport World Championship
Previous:	2006	Next:	2008
Support series: Superbike World Championship; FIM Superstock 1000 Cup; European Superstock 600 Championship

The 2007 Supersport World Championship was the ninth F.I.M. Supersport World Championship season—the eleventh taking into account the two held under the name of Supersport World Series. The season started on 24 February at Losail and finished on 7 October at Magny-Cours after 13 rounds. Kenan Sofuoğlu won the riders' championship with a record 8 wins. Honda won the manufacturers' championship.

== Race calendar and results ==
Round	Date	Round	Circuit	Pole position	Fastest lap	Race winner	Report
1	24 February	Qatar	Losail	(Australia) Kevin Curtain	(France) Sébastien Charpentier	(Turkey) Kenan Sofuoğlu	Report
2	4 March	Australia	Phillip Island	(France) Fabien Foret	(France) Sébastien Charpentier	(France) Fabien Foret	Report
3	1 April	Europe	Donington Park	(Spain) Pere Riba	(Japan) Katsuaki Fujiwara	(Turkey) Kenan Sofuoğlu	Report
4	15 April	Spain	Valencia	(Turkey) Kenan Sofuoğlu	(Japan) Katsuaki Fujiwara	(Turkey) Kenan Sofuoğlu	Report
5	29 April	Netherlands	Assen	(Turkey) Kenan Sofuoğlu	(Turkey) Kenan Sofuoğlu	(Turkey) Kenan Sofuoğlu	Report
6	13 May	Italy	Monza	(Turkey) Kenan Sofuoğlu	(Turkey) Kenan Sofuoğlu	(Turkey) Kenan Sofuoğlu	Report
7	27 May	(United Kingdom) Great Britain	Silverstone	(France) Sébastien Charpentier	(Australia) Anthony West	(Australia) Anthony West	Report
8	17 June	San Marino	Misano	(Australia) Broc Parkes	(Australia) Anthony West	(Australia) Anthony West	Report
9	22 July	Czech Republic	Brno	(Turkey) Kenan Sofuoğlu	(Turkey) Kenan Sofuoğlu	(Turkey) Kenan Sofuoğlu	Report
10	5 August	(United Kingdom) Great Britain	Brands Hatch	(France) Sébastien Charpentier	(Australia) Broc Parkes	(Australia) Broc Parkes	Report
11	9 September	Germany	EuroSpeedway Lausitz	(France) Sébastien Charpentier	(Turkey) Kenan Sofuoğlu	(Australia) Broc Parkes	Report
12	30 September	Italy	Vallelunga	(United Kingdom) Craig Jones	(Turkey) Kenan Sofuoğlu	(Turkey) Kenan Sofuoğlu	Report
13	7 October	France	Magny-Cours	(Turkey) Kenan Sofuoğlu	(Turkey) Kenan Sofuoğlu	(Turkey) Kenan Sofuoğlu	Report

== Entry list ==
Team	Constructor	Motorcycle	No.	Rider	Rounds
Extreme Rider Team	Ducati	Ducati 749R	51	(Italy) Alessio Corradi	12
Fabricom MCT Racing	Ducati	Ducati 749R	92	(Netherlands) Ghisbert Van Ginhoven	5
LBR Racing Team	Ducati	Ducati 749R	73	(Austria) Yves Polzer	1–8
LBR Racing Team	Ducati	Ducati 749R	91	(Germany) Christian Kellner	9
LBR Racing Team	Ducati	Ducati 749R	173	(Austria) Christian Zaiser	10–11
Team Caracchi Ducati SC	Ducati	Ducati 749R	69	(Italy) Gianluca Nannelli	1–7, 9–13
Team Caracchi Ducati SC	Ducati	Ducati 749R	100	(Italy) Alessio Brugnoni	8
Althea Honda Team	Honda	Honda CBR600RR	4	(Italy) Lorenzo Alfonsi	All
Althea Honda Team	Honda	Honda CBR600RR	21	(Japan) Katsuaki Fujiwara	All
CRS Grand Prix	Honda	Honda CBR600RR	46	(Germany) Jesco Günther	1–11
CRS Grand Prix	Honda	Honda CBR600RR	48	(United Kingdom) Joe Dickinson	13
CRS Grand Prix	Honda	Honda CBR600RR	112	(Italy) Stefano Cruciani	12
Duntep Racing Team	Honda	Honda CBR600RR	29	(Netherlands) Joan Veijer	5
Glaner Motorcard.com	Honda	Honda CBR600RR	26	(Spain) Joan Lascorz	All
Hanns-G J&E Sport TKR Honda	Honda	Honda CBR600RR	28	(Netherlands) Arie Vos	5
Hannspree Ten Kate Honda	Honda	Honda CBR600RR	15	(Australia) Andrew Pitt	4
Hannspree Ten Kate Honda	Honda	Honda CBR600RR	15	(Australia) Andrew Pitt	5
Hannspree Ten Kate Honda	Honda	Honda CBR600RR	16	(France) Sébastien Charpentier	1–3, 5–13
Hannspree Ten Kate Honda	Honda	Honda CBR600RR	54	(Turkey) Kenan Sofuoğlu	All
Hidalva Team	Honda	Honda CBR600RR	41	(Spain) Javier Hidalgo	4
HP Racing	Honda	Honda CBR600RR	12	(Spain) Javier Forés	All
Improve Racing Team	Honda	Honda CBR600RR	112	(Italy) Stefano Cruciani	8
Intermoto Czech	Honda	Honda CBR600RR	25	(Finland) Tatu Lauslehto	1–5
Intermoto Czech	Honda	Honda CBR600RR	37	(San Marino) William De Angelis	1, 6, 8–9
Intermoto Czech	Honda	Honda CBR600RR	58	(Czech Republic) Tomas Miksovsky	5
Intermoto Czech	Honda	Honda CBR600RR	71	(Italy) Mauro Sanchini	10–11, 13
Intermoto Czech	Honda	Honda CBR600RR	79	(Czech Republic) Michal Filla	12
Intermoto Czech	Honda	Honda CBR600RR	81	(France) Matthieu Lagrive	2–4, 6–12
Intermoto Czech	Honda	Honda CBR600RR	87	(France) Kenny Foray	13
Racing Team Parkalgar	Honda	Honda CBR600RR	17	(Portugal) Miguel Praia	All
Racing Team Parkalgar	Honda	Honda CBR600RR	116	(Italy) Simone Sanna	All
Revè Ekerold Honda Racing	Honda	Honda CBR600RR	18	(United Kingdom) Craig Jones	All
Sunstate Racing	Honda	Honda CBR600RR	74	(Australia) Judd Greedy	2
Stiggy Motorsport Honda	Honda	Honda CBR600RR	32	(France) Yoann Tiberio	1–8
Stiggy Motorsport Honda	Honda	Honda CBR600RR	111	(Germany) Arne Tode	12–13
Stiggy Motorsport Honda	Honda	Honda CBR600RR	125	(Australia) Josh Brookes	9–13
Stiggy Motorsport Honda	Honda	Honda CBR600RR	127	(Denmark) Robbin Harms	1–11
Team Benjan Motoren	Honda	Honda CBR600RR	61	(Germany) Rigo Richter	11
Team Benjan Motoren	Honda	Honda CBR600RR	62	(Sweden) Nicklas Cajback	11
Team Benjan Motoren	Honda	Honda CBR600RR	62	(Sweden) Nicklas Cajback	13
Team Benjan Motoren	Honda	Honda CBR600RR	96	(Sweden) Nikola Milovanovic	1–7, 9
Team Benjan Motoren	Honda	Honda CBR600RR	181	(United Kingdom) Graeme Gowland	10–12
Team Benjan Motoren	Honda	Honda CBR600RR	196	(Germany) Sascha Hommel	8
Vazy Racing Team	Honda	Honda CBR600RR	38	(France) Gregory Leblanc	1–4, 6–13
Lightspeed Kawasaki Supported	Kawasaki	Kawasaki ZX-6R	33	(Germany) Stefan Nebel	11–13
Lightspeed Kawasaki Supported	Kawasaki	Kawasaki ZX-6R	34	(Italy) Davide Giugliano	1–10
Scratch Moto Racing Team	Kawasaki	Kawasaki ZX-6R	118	(France) David Perret	13
Team Gil Motor Sport	Kawasaki	Kawasaki ZX-6R	7	(Spain) Pere Riba	All
Team Gil Motor Sport	Kawasaki	Kawasaki ZX-6R	9	(France) Fabien Foret	All
Team PMS Corse; Team PMS Kawasaki Supported	Kawasaki	Kawasaki ZX-6R	35	(Italy) Gilles Boccolini	All
Pioneer Hoegee Suzuki Racing	Suzuki	Suzuki GSX-R600	31	(Finland) Vesa Kallio	All
Pioneer Hoegee Suzuki Racing	Suzuki	Suzuki GSX-R600	77	(Netherlands) Barry Veneman	All
Electro Regenesis Racing	Yamaha	Yamaha YZF-R6	75	(Australia) Chris Seaton	2
KRTZ IV	Yamaha	Yamaha YZF-R6	78	(Czech Republic) Radomil Rous	9
KRTZ IV	Yamaha	Yamaha YZF-R6	79	(Czech Republic) Michal Filla	9
Moto 1 - Yamaha Bikersdays	Yamaha	Yamaha YZF-R6	8	(Canada) Chris Peris	1–6
RG Team	Yamaha	Yamaha YZF-R6	5	(Italy) Alessio Velini	3, 6
RG Team	Yamaha	Yamaha YZF-R6	45	(Italy) Gianluca Vizziello	All
Tati Team Beaujolais Racing	Yamaha	Yamaha YZF-R6	121	(France) Arnaud Vincent	3
Tati Team Beaujolais Racing	Yamaha	Yamaha YZF-R6	169	(France) Julien Enjolras	1–2, 4–13
Vector Racing Team	Yamaha	Yamaha YZF-R6	60	(Russia) Vladimir Ivanov	1–12
Vector Racing Team	Yamaha	Yamaha YZF-R6	72	(Hungary) Attila Magda	10
Vector Racing Team	Yamaha	Yamaha YZF-R6	88	(Hungary) Gergo Talmacsi	1–3, 6–9
WCR Bike Service	Yamaha	Yamaha YZF-R6	8	(Italy) Alessandro Brannetti	8
Yamaha Factory	Yamaha	Yamaha YZF-R6	82	(Spain) Adrian Bonastre	4
Yamaha - GMT 94	Yamaha	Yamaha YZF-R6	94	(Spain) David Checa	All
Yamaha - GMT 94	Yamaha	Yamaha YZF-R6	194	(France) Sébastien Gimbert	All
Yamaha Team Italia; Yamaha Lorenzini by Leoni	Yamaha	Yamaha YZF-R6	55	(Italy) Massimo Roccoli	All
Yamaha Spain	Yamaha	Yamaha YZF-R6	10	(Spain) Arturo Tizón	9–13
Yamaha Spain	Yamaha	Yamaha YZF-R6	39	(Spain) David Forner	1–8
Yamaha Spain	Yamaha	Yamaha YZF-R6	44	(Spain) David Salom	All
Yamaha World SSP Racing Team	Yamaha	Yamaha YZF-R6	3	(Australia) Jason O'Halloran	9
Yamaha World SSP Racing Team	Yamaha	Yamaha YZF-R6	6	(United Kingdom) Tommy Hill	10–13
Yamaha World SSP Racing Team	Yamaha	Yamaha YZF-R6	11	(Australia) Kevin Curtain	1–4
Yamaha World SSP Racing Team	Yamaha	Yamaha YZF-R6	14	(Australia) Anthony West	6–8
Yamaha World SSP Racing Team	Yamaha	Yamaha YZF-R6	23	(Australia) Broc Parkes	All
Yamaha World SSP Racing Team	Yamaha	Yamaha YZF-R6	99	(Australia) Steve Martin	5

Key
Regular rider
Wildcard rider
Replacement rider

- All entries used Pirelli tyres.

== Championship standings ==
=== Riders' standings ===
Pos.	Rider	Bike	QAT (Qatar)	AUS (Australia)	EUR (European Union)	ESP (Spain)	NED (Netherlands)	ITA (Italy)	GBR (United Kingdom)	SMR (San Marino)	CZE (Czech Republic)	GBR (United Kingdom)	GER (Germany)	ITA (Italy)	FRA (France)	Pts
1	(Turkey) Kenan Sofuoğlu	Honda	1	2	1	**1**	**1**	**1**	Ret	3	**1**	2	2	1	**1**	**276**
2	(Australia) Broc Parkes	Yamaha	Ret	3		5	Ret	Ret	Ret	**2**	13	1	1	4	2	**133**
3	(France) Fabien Foret	Kawasaki	4	**1**	Ret	4	3	2	4	Ret	3	6	Ret	14	Ret	**128**
4	(Japan) Katsuaki Fujiwara	Honda	3	5	3	18	Ret	6	3	8	6	Ret	Ret	10	8	**101**
5	(United Kingdom) Craig Jones	Honda	12	14	4	10	20	Ret	Ret	Ret	2	Ret	4	**2**	3	**94**
6	(Italy) Massimo Roccoli	Yamaha	7	26	8	7	14	11	Ret	4	4	3	7	Ret	10	**90**
7	(Denmark) Robbin Harms	Honda	6	7	2	DNS	DNS	Ret	2	5	Ret	4	DNS			**83**
8	(Netherlands) Barry Veneman	Suzuki	9	8	14	Ret	4	5	10	13	10	8	10	Ret	23	**70**
9	(Australia) Anthony West	Yamaha						3	1	1						**66**
10	(Italy) Gianluca Vizziello	Yamaha	15	Ret	12	11	18	20	5	9	Ret	11	13	5	4	**60**
11	(France) Sébastien Charpentier	Honda	Ret	4			6	Ret	**Ret**	10	8	**DSQ**	**9**	9	Ret	**51**
12	(Spain) David Checa	Yamaha	23	18	9	14	7	14	Ret	Ret	7	17	6	15	6	**50**
13	(Italy) Gianluca Nannelli	Ducati	8	Ret	10	3	Ret	4	DNS		15	Ret	11	DNS		**49**
14	(France) Matthieu Lagrive	Honda		Ret	Ret	DNS		Ret	6	12	Ret	10	3	6		**46**
15	(Italy) Lorenzo Alfonsi	Honda	13	9	Ret	13	11	8	8	16	14	7	Ret	Ret	17	**45**
16	(Italy) Simone Sanna	Honda	31	21	5	Ret	13	10	Ret	6	Ret	Ret	14	8	13	**43**
17	(Australia) Andrew Pitt	Honda				2	2									**40**
18	(Spain) Joan Lascorz	Honda	Ret	Ret	Ret	8	Ret	15	15	17	17	12	8	3	22	**38**
19	(Spain) Pere Riba	Kawasaki	5	6	**15**	Ret	12	12	Ret	Ret	25	9	17	Ret	Ret	**37**
20	(France) Sébastien Gimbert	Yamaha	Ret	13	11	15	Ret	17	12	14	9	13	12	13	11	**37**
21	(Spain) David Salom	Yamaha	14	15	13	6	5	9	17	Ret	21	24	20	Ret	Ret	**34**
22	(United Kingdom) Tommy Hill	Yamaha										5	5	Ret	5	**33**
23	(Finland) Vesa Kallio	Suzuki	10	Ret	Ret	9	8	13	Ret	Ret	11	Ret	24	12	21	**33**
24	(France) Yoann Tiberio	Honda	Ret	10	7	Ret	22	7	Ret	11						**29**
25	(Australia) Kevin Curtain	Yamaha	**2**	11		Ret										**25**
26	(Spain) Javier Forés	Honda	11	Ret	17	17	19	Ret	7	7	18	16	Ret	Ret	Ret	**23**
27	(Italy) Davide Giugliano	Kawasaki	20	Ret	6	12	9	DNS	Ret	Ret	20	WD				**21**
28	(Australia) Josh Brookes	Honda									5	Ret	16	Ret	7	**20**
29	(France) Gregory Leblanc	Honda	Ret	12	Ret	DNS		Ret	14	18	16	14	18	Ret	9	**15**
30	(Germany) Arne Tode	Honda												7	12	**13**
31	(France) Julien Enjolras	Yamaha	Ret	Ret		25	24	19	9	22	22	DNS	22	Ret	19	**7**
32	(Australia) Steve Martin	Yamaha					10									**6**
33	(United Kingdom) Graeme Gowland	Honda										19	21	11		**5**
34	(Portugal) Miguel Praia	Honda	19	24	20	21	Ret	21	11	21	Ret	21	Ret	Ret	Ret	**5**
35	(Australia) Jason O'Halloran	Yamaha									12					**4**
36	(Germany) Jesco Günther	Honda	22	25	21	Ret	25	24	13	Ret	Ret	23	Ret			**3**
37	(France) Kenny Foray	Honda													14	**2**
38	(France) David Perret	Kawasaki													15	**1**
39	(Germany) Stefan Nebel	Kawasaki											15	16	16	**1**
40	(Italy) Mauro Sanchini	Honda										15	Ret		Ret	**1**
41	(Italy) Gilles Boccolini	Kawasaki	Ret	20	18	16	Ret	Ret	Ret	15	Ret	18	Ret	18	18	**1**
42	(Netherlands) Arie Vos	Honda					15									**1**
	(Russia) Vladimir Ivanov	Yamaha	16	16	19	19	17	16	16	20	Ret	20	Ret	19		0
	(Canada) Chris Peris	Yamaha	17	Ret	16	20	16	Ret								0
	(Italy) Alessio Corradi	Ducati												17		0
	(Finland) Tatu Lauslehto	Honda	18	17	Ret	Ret	23									0
	(Spain) David Forner	Yamaha	Ret	27	22	23	27	25	18	24						0
	(Australia) Chris Seaton	Yamaha		19												0
	(Austria) Yves Polzer	Ducati	Ret	23	Ret	24	28	22	19	Ret						0
	(Italy) Alessandro Brannetti	Yamaha								19						0
	(Spain) Arturo Tizón	Yamaha									19	22	19	20	Ret	0
	(United Kingdom) Joe Dickinson	Honda													20	0
	(Hungary) Gergo Talmacsi	Yamaha	21	28	Ret			DNQ	Ret	25	Ret					0
	(Netherlands) Joan Veijer	Honda					21									0
	(France) Michal Filla	Yamaha									23					0
	(France) Michal Filla	Honda												21		0
	(Australia) Judy Greedy	Honda		22												0
	(Spain) Adrian Bonastre	Yamaha				22										0
	(Sweden) Nikola Milovanovic	Honda	24	29	Ret	Ret	Ret	23	DNS		Ret					0
	(Germany) Sascha Hommel	Honda								23						0
	(Germany) Rigo Richter	Honda											23			0
	(Czech Republic) Radomil Rous	Yamaha									24					0
	(Sweden) Nicklas Cajback	Honda											25		Ret	0
	(Spain) Javier Hidalgo	Honda				26										0
	(Czech Republic) Tomas Miksovsky	Honda					26									0
	(Netherlands) Ghisbert Van Ginhoven	Ducati					29									0
	(San Marino) William De Angelis	Honda	Ret					DNQ		Ret	DNS					0
	(France) Arnaud Vincent	Yamaha			Ret											0
	(Italy) Alessio Brugnoni	Ducati								Ret						0
	(Italy) Stefano Cruciani	Honda								Ret				Ret		0
	(Germany) Christian Kellner	Ducati									Ret					0
	(Hungary) Attila Magda	Yamaha										Ret				0
	(Austria) Christian Zaiser	Ducati										Ret	WD			0
	(Italy) Alessio Velini	Yamaha			DNS			DNS								
Pos.	Rider	Bike	QAT (Qatar)	AUS (Australia)	EUR (European Union)	ESP (Spain)	NED (Netherlands)	ITA (Italy)	GBR (United Kingdom)	SMR (San Marino)	CZE (Czech Republic)	GBR (United Kingdom)	GER (Germany)	ITA (Italy)	FRA (France)	Pts

Colour	Result
Gold	Winner
Silver	Second place
Bronze	Third place
Green	Points classification
Blue	Non-points classification
Blue	Non-classified finish (NC)
Purple	Retired, not classified (Ret)
Red	Did not qualify (DNQ)
Red	Did not pre-qualify (DNPQ)
Black	Disqualified (DSQ)
White	Did not start (DNS)
White	Withdrew (WD)
White	Race cancelled (C)
Blank	Did not practice (DNP)
Blank	Did not arrive (DNA)
Blank	Excluded (EX)

**Bold** – Pole position
Italics – Fastest lap

=== Manufacturers' standings ===
2007 final manufacturers' standings
Pos.	Manufacturer	QAT (Qatar)	AUS (Australia)	EUR (European Union)	ESP (Spain)	NED (Netherlands)	ITA (Italy)	GBR (United Kingdom)	SMR (San Marino)	CZE (Czech Republic)	GBR (United Kingdom)	GER (Germany)	ITA (Italy)	FRA (France)	Pts
1	(Japan) Honda	1	2	1	1	1	1	2	3	1	2	2	1	1	296
2	(Japan) Yamaha	2	3	8	5	5	3	1	1	4	1	1	4	2	228
3	(Japan) Kawasaki	4	1	6	4	3	2	4	15	3	6	15	14	15	141
4	(Japan) Suzuki	9	8	14	9	4	5	10	13	10	8	10	12	21	81
5	(Italy) Ducati	8	23	10	3	28	4	19	Ret	15	Ret	11	17		49
Pos.	Manufacturer	QAT (Qatar)	AUS (Australia)	EUR (European Union)	ESP (Spain)	NED (Netherlands)	ITA (Italy)	GBR (United Kingdom)	SMR (San Marino)	CZE (Czech Republic)	GBR (United Kingdom)	GER (Germany)	ITA (Italy)	FRA (France)	Pts
