= 2007 Phillip Island Superbike World Championship round =

(Australia) 2007 Australian Superbike World Championship round
Round details
- Round 2 of 13 rounds in the 2007 Superbike World Championship. and Round 2 of 13 rounds in the 2007 Supersport World Championship.
- Date: 4 March 2007, 2007
- Location: Phillip Island
- Course: Permanent racing facility 4.445 km (2.762 mi)

Superbike World Championship
Pole position
(Australia) Troy Bayliss
1:32.145
Fastest lap race 1	Fastest lap race 2
(Australia) Troy Corser	(Japan) Noriyuki Haga
1:31.826	1:32.621

Supersport World Championship
Pole position
(France) Fabien Foret
1:35.166
Fastest lap
(France) Sébastien Charpentier
1:34.976

The 2007 Phillip Island Superbike World Championship round was the second round of the 2007 Superbike World Championship. It took place on the weekend of 2–4 March 2007, at the 4.445 km Phillip Island Grand Prix Circuit in Australia.

== Superbike race 1 classification ==
Pos	No	Rider	Bike	Laps	Time	Grid	Points
1	21	(Australia) Troy Bayliss	Ducati 999 F07	22	34:11.276	1	25
2	52	(United Kingdom) James Toseland	Honda CBR1000RR	22	+2.096	2	20
3	3	(Italy) Max Biaggi	Suzuki GSX-R1000 K7	22	+10.143	5	16
4	41	(Japan) Noriyuki Haga	Yamaha YZF-R1	22	+18.923	4	13
5	11	(Australia) Troy Corser	Yamaha YZF-R1	22	+19.742	3	11
6	57	(Italy) Lorenzo Lanzi	Ducati 999 F07	22	+24.765	10	10
7	111	(Spain) Rubén Xaus	Ducati 999 F06	22	+27.404	8	9
8	76	(Germany) Max Neukirchner	Suzuki GSX-R1000 K6	22	+34.614	7	8
9	10	(Spain) Fonsi Nieto	Kawasaki ZX-10R	22	+35.339	6	7
10	99	(Australia) Steve Martin	Honda CBR1000RR	22	+36.238	11	6
11	44	(Italy) Roberto Rolfo	Honda CBR1000RR	22	+38.067	15	5
12	25	(Australia) Josh Brookes	Honda CBR1000RR	22	+47.078	12	4
13	38	(Japan) Shinichi Nakatomi	Yamaha YZF-R1	22	+58.571	17	3
14	96	(Czech Republic) Jakub Smrž	Ducati 999 F05	22	+1:08.000	14	2
15	53	(Italy) Alex Polita	Suzuki GSX-R1000 K6	22	+1:22.584	18	1
16	73	(Austria) Christian Zaiser	MV Agusta F4 1000R	22	+1:28.374	19	
17	42	(United Kingdom) Dean Ellison	Ducati 999RS	22	+1:30.184	21	
18	36	(Czech Republic) Jiří Dražďák	Yamaha YZF-R1	21	+1 Lap	20	
Ret	55	(France) Régis Laconi	Kawasaki ZX-10R	16	Retirement	9	
Ret	84	(Italy) Michel Fabrizio	Honda CBR1000RR	5	Retirement	13	

== Superbike race 2 classification ==
Pos	No	Rider	Bike	Laps	Time	Grid	Points
1	52	(United Kingdom) James Toseland	Honda CBR1000RR	22	34:16.990	2	25
2	21	(Australia) Troy Bayliss	Ducati 999 F07	22	+0.274	1	20
3	41	(Japan) Noriyuki Haga	Yamaha YZF-R1	22	+6.916	4	16
4	3	(Italy) Max Biaggi	Suzuki GSX-R1000 K7	22	+7.013	5	13
5	11	(Australia) Troy Corser	Yamaha YZF-R1	22	+7.052	3	11
6	111	(Spain) Rubén Xaus	Ducati 999 F06	22	+23.176	8	10
7	57	(Italy) Lorenzo Lanzi	Ducati 999 F07	22	+26.471	10	9
8	76	(Germany) Max Neukirchner	Suzuki GSX-R1000 K6	22	+26.471 (Note: In the first version of the race classification, Max Neukirchner and Michel Fabrizio crossed the finish line at the same time to the nearest thousandth of a second and Fabrizio was classified in eighth position; following a review of the official timing system, the FIM decided that Neukirchner had crossed the line 15 thousandths of a second before Fabrizio, switching their final position accordingly.)	7	8
9	84	(Italy) Michel Fabrizio	Honda CBR1000RR	22	+26.486	13	7
10	44	(Italy) Roberto Rolfo	Honda CBR1000RR	22	+37.936	15	6
11	96	(Czech Republic) Jakub Smrž	Ducati 999 F05	22	+41.308	14	5
12	25	(Australia) Josh Brookes	Honda CBR1000RR	22	+48.672	12	4
13	38	(Japan) Shinichi Nakatomi	Yamaha YZF-R1	22	+48.717	17	3
14	10	(Spain) Fonsi Nieto	Kawasaki ZX-10R	22	+1:13.095	6	2
15	53	(Italy) Alex Polita	Suzuki GSX-R1000 K6	22	+1:13.882	18	1
16	73	(Austria) Christian Zaiser	MV Agusta F4 1000R	22	+1:17.925	19	
Ret	42	(United Kingdom) Dean Ellison	Ducati 999RS	16	Retirement	21	
Ret	55	(France) Régis Laconi	Kawasaki ZX-10R	14	Retirement	9	
Ret	36	(Czech Republic) Jiří Dražďák	Yamaha YZF-R1	6	Retirement	20	
Ret	99	(Australia) Steve Martin	Honda CBR1000RR	1	Retirement	11	

== Supersport classification ==
Pos	No	Rider	Bike	Laps	Time	Grid	Points
1	9	(France) Fabien Foret	Kawasaki ZX-6R	21	33:46.218	1	25
2	54	(Turkey) Kenan Sofuoğlu	Honda CBR600RR	21	+0.704	4	20
3	23	(Australia) Broc Parkes	Yamaha YZF-R6	21	+2.243	6	16
4	16	(France) Sébastien Charpentier	Honda CBR600RR	21	+6.415	3	13
5	21	(Japan) Katsuaki Fujiwara	Honda CBR600RR	21	+15.085	8	11
6	7	(Spain) Pere Riba	Kawasaki ZX-6R	21	+15.192	11	10
7	127	(Denmark) Robbin Harms	Honda CBR600RR	21	+22.846	13	9
8	77	(Netherlands) Barry Veneman	Suzuki GSX-R600	21	+24.509	7	8
9	4	(Italy) Lorenzo Alfonsi	Honda CBR600RR	21	+26.146	16	7
10	32	(France) Yoann Tiberio	Honda CBR600RR	21	+29.413	9	6
11	11	(Australia) Kevin Curtain	Yamaha YZF-R6	21	+29.706	2	5
12	38	(France) Grégory Leblanc	Honda CBR600RR	21	+29.759	20	4
13	194	(France) Sébastien Gimbert	Yamaha YZF-R6	21	+35.318	12	3
14	18	(United Kingdom) Craig Jones	Honda CBR600RR	21	+43.153	18	2
15	44	(Spain) David Salom	Yamaha YZF-R6	21	+43.410	25	1
16	60	(Russia) Vladimir Ivanov	Yamaha YZF-R6	21	+49.548	15	
17	25	(Finland) Tatu Lauslehto	Honda CBR600RR	21	+55.766	29	
18	94	(Spain) David Checa	Yamaha YZF-R6	21	+56.298	10	
19	75	(Australia) Chris Seaton	Yamaha YZF-R6	21	+56.475	28	
20	35	(Italy) Gilles Boccolini	Kawasaki ZX-6R	21	+1:03.465	27	
21	116	(Italy) Simone Sanna	Honda CBR600RR	21	+1:03.474	21	
22	74	(Australia) Judd Greedy	Honda CBR600RR	21	+1:09.206	32	
23	73	(Austria) Yves Polzer	Ducati 749R	21	+1:14.588	35	
24	17	(Portugal) Miguel Praia	Honda CBR600RR	21	+1:15.200	34	
25	46	(Germany) Jesco Günther	Honda CBR600RR	21	+1:16.974	36	
26	55	(Italy) Massimo Roccoli	Yamaha YZF-R6	21	+1:21.124	17	
27	39	(Spain) David Forner	Yamaha YZF-R6	21	+1:38.135	37	
28	88	(Hungary) Gergő Talmácsi	Yamaha YZF-R6	21	+1:38.201	33	
29	96	(Sweden) Nikola Milovanovic	Honda CBR600RR	20	+1 Lap	38	
Ret	45	(Italy) Gianluca Vizziello	Yamaha YZF-R6	14	Retirement	24	
Ret	81	(France) Matthieu Lagrive	Honda CBR600RR	14	Retirement	26	
Ret	69	(Italy) Gianluca Nannelli	Ducati 749R	13	Retirement	5	
Ret	8	(Canada) Chris Peris	Yamaha YZF-R6	9	Retirement	19	
Ret	169	(France) Julien Enjolras	Yamaha YZF-R6	8	Retirement	31	
Ret	26	(Spain) Joan Lascorz	Honda CBR600RR	2	Retirement	30	
Ret	34	(Italy) Davide Giugliano	Kawasaki ZX-6R	1	Retirement	22	
Ret	12	(Spain) Javier Forés	Honda CBR600RR	0	Retirement	23	
Ret	31	(Finland) Vesa Kallio	Suzuki GSX-R600	0	Retirement	14	
