= 2006 Supersport World Championship =

2006 Supersport World Championship
Previous:	2005	Next:	2007
Support series: Superbike World Championship; FIM Superstock 1000 Cup; European Superstock 600 Championship

The 2006 Supersport World Championship was the eighth FIM Supersport World Championship season—the tenth taking into account the two held under the name of Supersport World Series. The season started on 25 February at Losail and finished on 8 October at Magny-Cours after 12 races.

The riders' championship was won by Sébastien Charpentier, with a total of 6 race wins. It was Charpentier's 2nd World Supersport Championship. The manufacturers' championship was won by Honda.

== Race calendar and results ==
Round	Date	Round	Circuit	Pole position	Fastest lap	Race winner	Report
1	25 February	Qatar	Losail	(France) Sébastien Charpentier	(France) Sébastien Charpentier	(France) Sébastien Charpentier	Report
2	5 March	Australia	Phillip Island	(France) Sébastien Charpentier	(Australia) Broc Parkes	(France) Sébastien Charpentier	Report
3	23 April	Spain	Valencia	(France) Sébastien Charpentier	(France) Sébastien Charpentier	(France) Sébastien Charpentier	Report
4	7 May	Italy	Monza	(France) Sébastien Charpentier	(France) Sébastien Charpentier	(France) Yoann Tiberio	Report
5	28 May	Europe	Silverstone	(France) Sébastien Charpentier	(Australia) Broc Parkes	(France) Sébastien Charpentier	Report
6	25 June	San Marino	Misano	(Australia) Broc Parkes	(Australia) Broc Parkes	(Italy) Massimo Roccoli	Report
7	23 July	Czech Republic	Brno	(Australia) Kevin Curtain	(France) Yoann Tiberio	(Australia) Kevin Curtain	Report
8	6 August	(United Kingdom) Great Britain	Brands Hatch	(Australia) Broc Parkes	(Australia) Kevin Curtain	(Australia) Broc Parkes	Report
9	3 September	Netherlands	Assen	(France) Sébastien Charpentier	(Australia) Kevin Curtain	(Turkey) Kenan Sofuoğlu	Report
10	10 September	Germany	EuroSpeedway Lausitz	(Australia) Kevin Curtain	(Turkey) Kenan Sofuoğlu	(Turkey) Kenan Sofuoğlu	Report
11	1 October	Italy	Imola	(France) Sébastien Charpentier	(France) Sébastien Charpentier	(France) Sébastien Charpentier	Report
12	8 October	France	Magny-Cours	(France) Sébastien Charpentier	(Turkey) Kenan Sofuoğlu	(France) Sébastien Charpentier	Report

== Entry list ==
Team	Constructor	Motorcycle	No.	Rider	Rounds
Ducati SC - Caracchi; Team Manila Grace SC	Ducati	Ducati 749R	57	(Slovenia) Luka Nedog	All
Ducati SC - Caracchi; Team Manila Grace SC	Ducati	Ducati 749R	69	(Italy) Gianluca Nannelli	8–12
Ducati SC - Caracchi; Team Manila Grace SC	Ducati	Ducati 749R	72	(United Kingdom) Stuart Easton	4–12
Ducati SC - Caracchi; Team Manila Grace SC	Ducati	Ducati 749R	75	(Australia) Josh Brookes	1–3
LBR Ducati Racing	Ducati	Ducati 749R	73	(Austria) Christian Zaiser	All
Angel Racing	Honda	Honda CBR600RR	52	(United Kingdom) Steven Neate	5
BRC Racing	Honda	Honda CBR600RR	29	(Czech Republic) Vactav Bittman	7
CRS Grand Prix	Honda	Honda CBR600RR	65	(Spain) Joan Lascorz	11
CRS Grand Prix	Honda	Honda CBR600RR	66	(Germany) Jesco Günther	12
CRS Grand Prix	Honda	Honda CBR600RR	91	(Spain) Javier Hidalgo	7–8
CRS Grand Prix	Honda	Honda CBR600RR	121	(Italy) Alessio Aldrovandi	3–6, 9–10
Dark Dog Stiggy Motorsports	Honda	Honda CBR600RR	25	(Finland) Tatu Lauslehto	All
Dark Dog Stiggy Motorsports	Honda	Honda CBR600RR	116	(Sweden) Johan Stigefelt	All
Dark Dog Stiggy Motorsports	Honda	Honda CBR600RR	127	(Denmark) Robin Harms	All
Duntep Racing Team	Honda	Honda CBR600RR	30	(Netherlands) Joan Veijer	9
Hardinge Ice Valley M.	Honda	Honda CBR600RR	27	(United Kingdom) Tom Tunstall	All
Honda BQR	Honda	Honda CBR600RR	33	(Spain) Victor Carrasco	3
Intermoto Czech Klaffi	Honda	Honda CBR600RR	18	(France) Mathieu Lagrive	5–11
Intermoto Czech Klaffi	Honda	Honda CBR600RR	28	(Netherlands) Arie Vos	12
Intermoto Czech Klaffi	Honda	Honda CBR600RR	37	(San Marino) William De Angelis	All
Intermoto Czech Klaffi	Honda	Honda CBR600RR	58	(Czech Republic) Tomas Miksovsky	1–4
J&E Sport Ten Kate Honda	Honda	Honda CBR600RR	28	(Netherlands) Arie Vos	9
Legrelle - Honda Belgium	Honda	Honda CBR600RR	145	(Belgium) Sebastien Le Grelle	1–11
Megabike Honda Team	Honda	Honda CBR600RR	3	(Japan) Katsuaki Fujiwara	1, 3–5, 9–12
Megabike Honda Team	Honda	Honda CBR600RR	32	(France) Yoann Tiberio	2–12
Megabike Honda Team	Honda	Honda CBR600RR	61	(Italy) Simone Sanna	6–8
Northpoint Eckerold Honda	Honda	Honda CBR600RR	53	(United Kingdom) Cal Crutchlow	8
Northpoint Eckerold Honda	Honda	Honda CBR600RR	56	(United Kingdom) Leon Camier	8
Passione Moto	Honda	Honda CBR600RR	24	(Italy) Stefano Cruciani	4, 11
Team Parkalgar	Honda	Honda CBR600RR	17	(Portugal) Miguel Praia	3–12
Team Parkalgar	Honda	Honda CBR600RR	61	(Italy) Simone Sanna	12
Vazy Racing Team	Honda	Honda CBR600RR	38	(France) Grégory Leblanc	All
Winston Ten Kate Honda	Honda	Honda CBR600RR	16	(France) Sébastien Charpentier	1–5, 7–11
Winston Ten Kate Honda	Honda	Honda CBR600RR	28	(Netherlands) Arie Vos	6
Winston Ten Kate Honda	Honda	Honda CBR600RR	54	(Turkey) Kenan Sofuoğlu	All
Gil Motor Sport	Kawasaki	Kawasaki ZX-6R	7	(France) Stéphane Chambon	3–12
Gil Motor Sport	Kawasaki	Kawasaki ZX-6R	8	(France) Maxime Berger	1–11
Gil Motor Sport	Kawasaki	Kawasaki ZX-6R	10	(France) Fabien Foret	12
Gil Motor Sport	Kawasaki	Kawasaki ZX-6R	19	(Australia) Dean Thomas	1–2
Kawasaki Bertocchi	Kawasaki	Kawasaki ZX-6R	26	(Italy) Alessandro Antonello	6
MSS Discovery Racing	Kawasaki	Kawasaki ZX-6R	51	(Spain) Pere Riba	5
Scratch Moto Racing	Kawasaki	Kawasaki ZX-6R	39	(France) David Perret	12
Hoegee Suzuki	Suzuki	Suzuki GSX-R600	22	(Norway) Kai Børre Andersen	1–5, 7–12
Hoegee Suzuki	Suzuki	Suzuki GSX-R600	77	(Netherlands) Barry Veneman	All
Hoegee Suzuki	Suzuki	Suzuki GSX-R600	80	(United States) Kurtis Roberts	6
Bikersdays Yamaha Moto 1	Yamaha	Yamaha YZF-R6	6	(Italy) Mauro Sanchini	6–12
Bikersdays Yamaha Moto 1	Yamaha	Yamaha YZF-R6	9	(Italy) Alessio Corradi	4–7
Bikersdays Yamaha Moto 1	Yamaha	Yamaha YZF-R6	21	(Canada) Chris Peris	1–5, 8–12
Bikersdays Yamaha Moto 1	Yamaha	Yamaha YZF-R6	34	(Belgium) Didier Van Keymeulen	1–3
Edo Racing	Yamaha	Yamaha YZF-R6	69	(Italy) Gianluca Nannelli	1–2
Edo Racing	Yamaha	Yamaha YZF-R6	76	(Spain) Bernat Martinez	3, 5–7
RG Team	Yamaha	Yamaha YZF-R6	6	(Italy) Mauro Sanchini	1–5
RG Team	Yamaha	Yamaha YZF-R6	9	(Italy) Alessio Corradi	11–12
RG Team	Yamaha	Yamaha YZF-R6	63	(Italy) Lorenzo Alfonsi	9–10
RG Team	Yamaha	Yamaha YZF-R6	99	(Italy) Sebastiano Zerbo	6–8
San Marino Bike Service	Yamaha	Yamaha YZF-R6	20	(Italy) Diego Giugovaz	6
SLM Racing	Yamaha	Yamaha YZF-R6	12	(Spain) Javier Forés	1–8
SLM Racing	Yamaha	Yamaha YZF-R6	15	(Italy) Andrea Berta	1–11
SLM Racing	Yamaha	Yamaha YZF-R6	31	(Finland) Vesa Kallio	9–12
SLM Racing	Yamaha	Yamaha YZF-R6	34	(Belgium) Didier Van Keymeulen	12
Speed Moto	Yamaha	Yamaha YZF-R6	35	(Spain) Jordi Torres	3, 11
Tati Team Beaujolais Racing	Yamaha	Yamaha YZF-R6	68	(Spain) David Forner	1–4, 6–7
Tati Team Beaujolais Racing	Yamaha	Yamaha YZF-R6	71	(United Kingdom) Sam Owens	5
Tati Team Beaujolais Racing	Yamaha	Yamaha YZF-R6	88	(France) Julien Enjolras	All
Tati Team Beaujolais Racing	Yamaha	Yamaha YZF-R6	93	(France) Stephane Duterne	8–9, 11–12
Umbria Bike	Yamaha	Yamaha YZF-R6	5	(Italy) Alessio Velini	1–10, 12
Vector Racing	Yamaha	Yamaha YZF-R6	60	(Russia) Vladimir Ivanov	All
Yamaha - GMT 94	Yamaha	Yamaha YZF-R6	41	(United States) Kenny Noyes	3
Yamaha - GMT 94	Yamaha	Yamaha YZF-R6	49	(Australia) Anthony Gobert	1–2
Yamaha - GMT 94	Yamaha	Yamaha YZF-R6	94	(Spain) David Checa	4–12
Yamaha Motor Germany	Yamaha	Yamaha YZF-R6	10	(France) Fabien Foret	10
Yamaha Motor Germany	Yamaha	Yamaha YZF-R6	11	(Australia) Kevin Curtain	All
Yamaha Motor Germany	Yamaha	Yamaha YZF-R6	23	(Australia) Broc Parkes	1–9, 11–12
Yamaha Racing Support	Yamaha	Yamaha YZF-R6	31	(Finland) Vesa Kallio	4, 7
Yamaha Sebring	Yamaha	Yamaha YZF-R6	67	(Austria) Gunter Knobloch	10
Yamaha Team Italia	Yamaha	Yamaha YZF-R6	45	(Italy) Gianluca Vizziello	All
Yamaha Team Italia	Yamaha	Yamaha YZF-R6	55	(Italy) Massimo Roccoli	All
Yamaha Moto Vitesse Reunion	Yamaha	Yamaha YZF-R6	40	(France) Thomas Metro	12

Key
Regular rider
Wildcard rider
Replacement rider

- All entries used Pirelli tyres.

== Championship standings ==
=== Riders' standings ===
Pos.	Rider	Bike	QAT (Qatar)	AUS (Australia)	ESP (Spain)	ITA (Italy)	EUR (European Union)	SMR (San Marino)	CZE (Czech Republic)	GBR (United Kingdom)	NED (Netherlands)	GER (Germany)	ITA (Italy)	FRA (France)	Pts
1	(France) Sébastien Charpentier	Honda	**1**	**1**	**1**	**3**	**1**		11	6	**4**	Ret	**1**	**1**	194
2	(Australia) Kevin Curtain	Yamaha	2	2	2	Ret	3	6	**1**	2	2	**2**	3	Ret	187
3	(Turkey) Kenan Sofuoğlu	Honda	3	Ret	Ret	5	20	8	3	3	1	1	2	2	157
4	(Australia) Broc Parkes	Yamaha	Ret	3	4	7	2	**3**	2	**1**	Ret		6	3	145
5	(Denmark) Robbin Harms	Honda	6	5	5	2	5	5	Ret	4	9	4	Ret	6	117
6	(Italy) Massimo Roccoli	Yamaha	7	10	8	4	6	1	Ret	9	8	12	10	Ret	96
7	(France) Yoann Tiberio	Honda		4	6	1	14	Ret	4	12	Ret	Ret	9	10	80
8	(Sweden) Johan Stigefelt	Honda	5	7	Ret	8	9	9	6	11	Ret	Ret	11	8	70
9	(Italy) Gianluca Vizziello	Yamaha	9	13	9	Ret	Ret	7	5	Ret	7	6	4	Ret	69
10	(Spain) Javier Forés	Yamaha	4	15	7	9	7	10	12	Ret					49
11	(Spain) David Checa	Yamaha				13	11	4	8	21	Ret	Ret	12	5	44
12	(Italy) Gianluca Nannelli	Yamaha	15	Ret											43
12	(Italy) Gianluca Nannelli	Ducati								8	15	5	7	4	43
13	(Japan) Katsuaki Fujiwara	Honda	Ret		3	Ret	10				17	22	8	7	39
14	(Italy) Simone Sanna	Honda						2	9	Ret				11	32
15	(France) Stéphane Chambon	Kawasaki			Ret	10	17	DNS	13	7	Ret	10	16	9	31
16	(Austria) Christian Zaiser	Ducati	8	9	Ret	Ret	Ret	Ret	10	Ret	Ret	7	17	Ret	30
17	(Norway) Kai Børre Andersen	Suzuki	Ret	Ret	Ret	15	13		15	16	3	8	Ret	Ret	29
18	(United Kingdom) Stuart Easton	Ducati				6	15	DNS	Ret	Ret	10	11	14	14	26
19	(Italy) Mauro Sanchini	Yamaha	19	12	Ret	17	19	15	7	14	Ret	13	Ret	12	23
20	(San Marino) William De Angelis	Honda	13	16	12	DNS	DNS	12	Ret	18	Ret	Ret	5	Ret	22
21	(Australia) Josh Brookes	Ducati	10	6	11										21
22	(Netherlands) Barry Veneman	Suzuki	25	Ret	10	Ret	18	16	Ret	15	6	DNS	13	Ret	20
23	(France) Matthieu Lagrive	Honda					8	13	Ret	19	Ret	9	Ret		18
24	(France) Maxime Berger	Kawasaki	Ret	Ret	17	16	12	11	Ret	13	11	Ret	Ret		17
25	(France) Fabien Foret	Yamaha										3			16
25	(France) Fabien Foret	Kawasaki												Ret	16
26	(Belgium) Sébastien Le Grelle	Honda	11	11	14	Ret	Ret	21	Ret		12	Ret	DNA		16
27	(Spain) Pere Riba	Kawasaki					4								13
28	(Netherlands) Arie Vos	Honda						14			5			19	13
29	(United Kingdom) Cal Crutchlow	Honda								5					11
30	(Finland) Tatu Lauslehto	Honda	24	Ret	13	11	16	20	14	17	20	15	18	Ret	11
31	(Australia) Dean Thomas	Kawasaki	Ret	8											8
32	(United Kingdom) Leon Camier	Honda								10					6
33	(Finland) Vesa Kallio	Yamaha				14			Ret		14	17	22	15	5
34	(Italy) Stefano Cruciani	Honda				12							23		4
35	(Australia) Anthony Gobert	Yamaha	12	Ret											4
36	(France) Grégory Leblanc	Honda	Ret	17	16	23	26	18	Ret	DNS	Ret	19	DNA	13	3
37	(Italy) Alessio Velini	Yamaha	21	Ret	19		Ret	Ret	Ret	26	13	Ret		17	3
38	(Canada) Chris Peris	Yamaha	18	20	21	20	WD			22	Ret	14	15	Ret	3
39	(United Kingdom) Tom Tunstall	Honda	14	18	15	Ret	22	22	18	20	16	23	21	18	3
40	(Belgium) Didier van Keymeulen	Yamaha	16	14	DNS									Ret	2
	(Spain) Javier Hidalgo	Honda							16	25					0
	(Russia) Vladimir Ivanov	Yamaha	20	19	23	22	25	Ret	Ret	24	19	16	25	Ret	0
	(Portugal) Miguel Praia	Honda			20	19	23	19	Ret	27	18	18	Ret	16	0
	(Czech Republic) Tomas Miksovsky	Honda	17	Ret	22	18									0
	(Spain) Bernat Martinez	Yamaha			DNS		21	17	Ret						0
	(France) Julien Enjolras	Yamaha	23	Ret	Ret	DNS	Ret	Ret	17	23	Ret	Ret	Ret	WD	0
	(Italy) Alessio Aldrovandi	Honda			18	DNS	Ret	DNS			21	Ret			0
	(Italy) Alessio Corradi	Yamaha				WD	Ret	19	Ret				19	Ret	0
	(Czech Republic) Vactav Bittman	Honda							19						0
	(Spain) David Forner	Yamaha	22	21	Ret	Ret		Ret	20						0
	(Italy) Lorenzo Alfonsi	Yamaha									Ret	20			0
	(Spain) Joan Lascorz	Honda											20		0
	(France) Thomas Metro	Yamaha												20	0
	(Italy) Andrea Berta	Yamaha	Ret	Ret	Ret	21	DNS	Ret	Ret	Ret	Ret	Ret	Ret		0
	(Austria) Gunter Knobloch	Yamaha										21			0
	(Slovenia) Luka Nedog	Ducati	Ret	Ret	24	Ret	DNQ	Ret	Ret	29	Ret	Ret	Ret	Ret	0
	(United Kingdom) Sam Owens	Yamaha					24								0
	(Spain) Jordi Torres	Yamaha			DSQ								24		0
	(France) Stephane Duterne	Yamaha								28	Ret		26	DNS	0
	(United States) Kenny Noyes	Yamaha			Ret										0
	(Spain) Victor Carrasco	Honda			Ret										0
	(United Kingdom) Steven Neate	Honda					Ret								0
	(Italy) Alessandro Antonello	Kawasaki						Ret							0
	(Italy) Sebastiano Zerbo	Yamaha						Ret	Ret	Ret					0
	(Netherlands) Joan Veijer	Honda									Ret				0
	(France) David Perret	Kawasaki												Ret	0
	(Germany) Jesco Günther	Honda												Ret	0
	(Italy) Diego Giugovaz	Yamaha						DNS							
	(United States) Kurtis Roberts	Suzuki						WD							
Pos	Rider	Bike	QAT (Qatar)	AUS (Australia)	ESP (Spain)	ITA (Italy)	EUR (European Union)	SMR (San Marino)	CZE (Czech Republic)	GBR (United Kingdom)	NED (Netherlands)	GER (Germany)	ITA (Italy)	FRA (France)	Pts

Colour	Result
Gold	Winner
Silver	Second place
Bronze	Third place
Green	Points classification
Blue	Non-points classification
Blue	Non-classified finish (NC)
Purple	Retired, not classified (Ret)
Red	Did not qualify (DNQ)
Red	Did not pre-qualify (DNPQ)
Black	Disqualified (DSQ)
White	Did not start (DNS)
White	Withdrew (WD)
White	Race cancelled (C)
Blank	Did not practice (DNP)
Blank	Did not arrive (DNA)
Blank	Excluded (EX)

**Bold** – Pole position
Italics – Fastest lap

=== Manufacturers' standings ===
Pos.	Manufacturer	QAT (Qatar)	AUS (Australia)	ESP (Spain)	ITA (Italy)	EUR (European Union)	SMR (San Marino)	CZE (Czech Republic)	GBR (United Kingdom)	NED (Netherlands)	GER (Germany)	ITA (Italy)	FRA (France)	Pts
1	(Japan) Honda	1	1	1	1	1	2	3	3	1	1	1	1	**277**
2	(Japan) Yamaha	2	2	2	4	2	1	1	1	2	2	3	3	**240**
3	(Italy) Ducati	8	6	11	6	15	Ret	10	8	10	5	7	4	**87**
4	(Japan) Kawasaki	Ret	8	17	10	4	11	13	7	11	10	16	9	**62**
5	(Japan) Suzuki	25	Ret	10	15	13	16	15	15	3	8	13	Ret	**39**
Pos	Manufacturer	QAT (Qatar)	AUS (Australia)	ESP (Spain)	ITA (Italy)	EUR (European Union)	SMR (San Marino)	CZE (Czech Republic)	GBR (United Kingdom)	NED (Netherlands)	GER (Germany)	ITA (Italy)	FRA (France)	Pts
