= 2007 Losail Superbike World Championship round =

2007 Qatar Superbike World Championship round
Round details
- Round 1 of 13 rounds in the 2007 Superbike World Championship. and Round 1 of 13 rounds in the 2007 Supersport World Championship.
- Date: February 24, 2007
- Location: Losail Circuit
- Course: Permanent racing facility 5.380 km (3.343 mi)

Superbike World Championship
Pole position
(Australia) Troy Corser
1:58.402
Fastest lap race 1	Fastest lap race 2
(Italy) Max Biaggi	(Italy) Max Biaggi
1:59.275	1:59.194

Supersport World Championship
Pole position
(Australia) Kevin Curtain
2:02.081
Fastest lap
(France) Sébastien Charpentier
2:02.949

The 2007 Losail Superbike World Championship round was the opening round of the 2007 Superbike World Championship. It took place on the weekend of February 22–24, 2007, at the 5.38 km (3.34 mi) Losail International Circuit in Qatar.

== Superbike race 1 classification ==
Pos	No	Rider	Bike	Laps	Time	Grid	Points
1	3	(Italy) Max Biaggi	Suzuki GSX-R1000 K7	18	36:10.115	2	25
2	52	(United Kingdom) James Toseland	Honda CBR1000RR	18	+1.483	3	20
3	57	(Italy) Lorenzo Lanzi	Ducati 999 F07	18	+13.906	5	16
4	71	(Japan) Yukio Kagayama	Suzuki GSX-R1000 K7	18	+14.819	7	13
5	21	(Australia) Troy Bayliss	Ducati 999 F07	18	+17.305	6	11
6	76	(Germany) Max Neukirchner	Suzuki GSX-R1000 K6	18	+24.931	8	10
7	44	(Italy) Roberto Rolfo	Honda CBR1000RR	18	+25.165	10	9
8	41	(Japan) Noriyuki Haga	Yamaha YZF-R1	18	+27.320	4	8
9	11	(Australia) Troy Corser	Yamaha YZF-R1	18	+31.237	1	7
10	111	(Spain) Rubén Xaus	Ducati 999 F06	18	+31.669	11	6
11	99	(Australia) Steve Martin	Honda CBR1000RR	18	+42.355	17	5
12	38	(Japan) Shinichi Nakatomi	Yamaha YZF-R1	18	+46.845	16	4
13	53	(Italy) Alex Polita	Suzuki GSX-R1000 K6	18	+59.207	19	3
14	96	(Czech Republic) Jakub Smrž	Ducati 999 F05	18	+1:00.296	21	2
15	42	(United Kingdom) Dean Ellison	Ducati 999RS	18	+1:21.043	20	1
16	73	(Austria) Christian Zaiser	MV Agusta F4 1000R	18	+1:44.306	18	
17	95	(Qatar) Mashel Al Naimi	Kawasaki ZX-10R	17	+1 Lap	23	
Ret	55	(France) Régis Laconi	Kawasaki ZX-10R	11	Retirement	13	
Ret	10	(Spain) Fonsi Nieto	Kawasaki ZX-10R	11	Retirement	9	
Ret	25	(Australia) Josh Brookes	Honda CBR1000RR	11	Retirement	15	
Ret	36	(Czech Republic) Jiří Dražďák	Yamaha YZF-R1	7	Retirement	22	
Ret	31	(Australia) Karl Muggeridge	Honda CBR1000RR	0	Retirement	14	
Ret	84	(Italy) Michel Fabrizio	Honda CBR1000RR	0	Retirement	12	

== Superbike race 2 classification ==
Pos	No	Rider	Bike	Laps	Time	Grid	Points
1	52	(United Kingdom) James Toseland	Honda CBR1000RR	18	36:09.433	3	25
2	3	(Italy) Max Biaggi	Suzuki GSX-R1000 K7	18	+0.738	2	20
3	11	(Australia) Troy Corser	Yamaha YZF-R1	18	+7.386	1	16
4	41	(Japan) Noriyuki Haga	Yamaha YZF-R1	18	+14.984	4	13
5	10	(Spain) Fonsi Nieto	Kawasaki ZX-10R	18	+15.033	9	11
6	71	(Japan) Yukio Kagayama	Suzuki GSX-R1000 K7	18	+15.911	7	10
7	57	(Italy) Lorenzo Lanzi	Ducati 999 F07	18	+16.664	5	9
8	21	(Australia) Troy Bayliss	Ducati 999 F07	18	+23.249	6	8
9	111	(Spain) Rubén Xaus	Ducati 999 F06	18	+24.282	11	7
10	76	(Germany) Max Neukirchner	Suzuki GSX-R1000 K6	18	+33.480	8	6
11	55	(France) Régis Laconi	Kawasaki ZX-10R	18	+34.004	13	5
12	84	(Italy) Michel Fabrizio	Honda CBR1000RR	18	+37.297	12	4
13	25	(Australia) Josh Brookes	Honda CBR1000RR	18	+42.064	15	3
14	31	(Australia) Karl Muggeridge	Honda CBR1000RR	18	+42.359	14	2
15	53	(Italy) Alex Polita	Suzuki GSX-R1000 K6	18	+46.206	19	1
16	96	(Czech Republic) Jakub Smrž	Ducati 999 F05	18	+46.467	21	
17	38	(Japan) Shinichi Nakatomi	Yamaha YZF-R1	18	+51.300	16	
18	99	(Australia) Steve Martin	Honda CBR1000RR	18	+1:03.411	17	
19	42	(United Kingdom) Dean Ellison	Ducati 999RS	18	+1:42.715	20	
20	95	(Qatar) Mashel Al Naimi	Kawasaki ZX-10R	17	+1 Lap	23	
Ret	36	(Czech Republic) Jiří Dražďák	Yamaha YZF-R1	6	Retirement	22	
Ret	44	(Italy) Roberto Rolfo	Honda CBR1000RR	0	Retirement	10	
Ret	73	(Austria) Christian Zaiser	MV Agusta F4 1000R	0	Retirement	18	

== Supersport classification ==
Pos	No	Rider	Bike	Laps	Time	Grid	Points
1	54	(Turkey) Kenan Sofuoğlu	Honda CBR600RR	18	37:22.452	4	25
2	11	(Australia) Kevin Curtain	Yamaha YZF-R6	18	+3.413	1	20
3	21	(Japan) Katsuaki Fujiwara	Honda CBR600RR	18	+6.228	3	16
4	9	(France) Fabien Foret	Kawasaki ZX-6R	18	+13.759	5	13
5	7	(Spain) Pere Riba	Kawasaki ZX-6R	18	+13.857	6	11
6	127	(Denmark) Robbin Harms	Honda CBR600RR	18	+14.534	13	10
7	55	(Italy) Massimo Roccoli	Yamaha YZF-R6	18	+18.650	10	9
8	69	(Italy) Gianluca Nannelli	Ducati 749R	18	+18.775	8	8
9	77	(Netherlands) Barry Veneman	Suzuki GSX-R600	18	+19.291	11	7
10	31	(Finland) Vesa Kallio	Suzuki GSX-R600	18	+20.595	12	6
11	12	(Spain) Javier Forés	Honda CBR600RR	18	+20.817	14	5
12	18	(United Kingdom) Craig Jones	Honda CBR600RR	18	+22.398	22	4
13	4	(Italy) Lorenzo Alfonsi	Honda CBR600RR	18	+26.903	20	3
14	44	(Spain) David Salom	Yamaha YZF-R6	18	+28.568	21	2
15	45	(Italy) Gianluca Vizziello	Yamaha YZF-R6	18	+34.516	17	1
16	60	(Russia) Vladimir Ivanov	Yamaha YZF-R6	18	+36.969	19	
17	8	(Canada) Chris Peris	Yamaha YZF-R6	18	+43.631	16	
18	25	(Finland) Tatu Lauslehto	Honda CBR600RR	18	+57.399	28	
19	17	(Portugal) Miguel Praia	Honda CBR600RR	18	+1:08.489	27	
20	34	(Italy) Davide Giugliano	Kawasaki ZX-6R	18	+1:08.518	15	
21	88	(Hungary) Gergő Talmácsi	Yamaha YZF-R6	18	+1:08.688	32	
22	46	(Germany) Jesco Günther	Honda CBR600RR	18	+1:15.546	30	
23	94	(Spain) David Checa	Yamaha YZF-R6	18	+1:25.936	24	
24	96	(Sweden) Nikola Milovanovic	Honda CBR600RR	18	+1:29.951	35	
Ret	169	(France) Julien Enjolras	Yamaha YZF-R6	17	Retirement	31	
Ret	35	(Italy) Gilles Boccolini	Kawasaki ZX-6R	17	Retirement	34	
Ret	16	(France) Sébastien Charpentier	Honda CBR600RR	16	Retirement	2	
Ret	26	(Spain) Joan Lascorz	Honda CBR600RR	13	Retirement	18	
Ret	194	(France) Sébastien Gimbert	Yamaha YZF-R6	13	Retirement	25	
Ret	32	(France) Yoann Tiberio	Honda CBR600RR	12	Retirement	9	
Ret	116	(Italy) Simone Sanna	Honda CBR600RR	12	Retirement	26	
Ret	73	(Austria) Yves Polzer	Ducati 749R	7	Retirement	33	
Ret	23	(Australia) Broc Parkes	Yamaha YZF-R6	5	Retirement	7	
Ret	38	(France) Grégory Leblanc	Honda CBR600RR	5	Retirement	23	
Ret	37	(San Marino) William de Angelis	Honda CBR600RR	2	Retirement	29	
Ret	39	(Spain) David Forner	Yamaha YZF-R6	0	Retirement	36	
