= Piergiorgio Bontempi =

Italian motorcycle racer

- Nationality: (Italy) Italian
- Born: 6 February 1968 (age 58); Ancona (Italy)
Motorcycle racing career statistics
Superbike World Championship
Active years	1989–1998, 2004
Manufacturers	Honda, Ducati, Kawasaki, Suzuki
Championships	0
Starts / Wins / Podiums / Poles / F. laps / Points; 195 / 0 / 3 / 0 / 1 / 898.5
Supersport World Championship
Active years	1999–2002, 2005
Manufacturers	Yamaha, Ducati
Championships	0
Starts / Wins / Podiums / Poles / F. laps / Points; 45 / 1 / 5 / 2 / 2 / 276

Piergiorgio Bontempi (born 6 February 1968) is an Italian former professional motorcycle racer.

Born in Ancona, Bontempi competed in the Superbike World Championship for over ten years. He also competed in the Supersport World Championship, winning one race at the Nürburgring in 1999.

== Career statistics ==
=== Superbike World Championship ===
==== Races by year ====
(key) (Races in bold indicate pole position) (Races in italics indicate fastest lap)

Year	Make	1		2		3		4		5		6		7		8		9		10		11		12		13		Pos.	Pts
Year	Make	R1	R2	R1	R2	R1	R2	R1	R2	R1	R2	R1	R2	R1	R2	R1	R2	R1	R2	R1	R2	R1	R2	R1	R2	R1	R2	Pos.	Pts
1989	Honda	GBR; 28	GBR; Ret	HUN; DNQ	HUN; DNQ	CAN	CAN	USA	USA	AUT; 32	AUT; 19	FRA; 21	FRA; Ret	JPN	JPN	GER	GER	ITA; 10	ITA; 12	AUS	AUS	NZL	NZL					50th	10
1990	Ducati	SPA	SPA	GBR	GBR	HUN	HUN	GER	GER	CAN	CAN	USA	USA	AUT	AUT	JPN	JPN	FRA; DNS	FRA; Ret	ITA; DNQ	ITA; DNQ	MAL	MAL	AUS	AUS	NZL	NZL	NC	0
1991	Kawasaki	GBR	GBR	SPA	SPA	CAN	CAN	USA	USA	AUT	AUT	SMR; NC	SMR; Ret	SWE; 16	SWE; Ret	JPN	JPN	MAL	MAL	GER; DNQ	GER; DNQ	FRA; 11	FRA; DNS	ITA; Ret	ITA; 4	AUS	AUS	35th	18
1992	Kawasaki	SPA; Ret	SPA; Ret	GBR; 17	GBR; Ret	GER; 10	GER; 21	BEL; 14	BEL; 13	SPA; 10	SPA; 11	AUT; 14	AUT; Ret	ITA; 11	ITA; 9	MAL; 9	MAL; 10	JPN; 9	JPN; 11	NED; 6	NED; Ret	ITA; 4	ITA; 3	AUS; 8	AUS; 7	NZL; 7	NZL; Ret	10th	125
1993	Kawasaki	IRL; Ret	IRL; Ret	GER; 30	GER; 9	SPA; 3	SPA; 6	SMR; Ret	SMR; 7	AUT; 5	AUT; 15	CZE; 7	CZE; 6	SWE; 7	SWE; 8	MAL; 6	MAL; 4	JPN; 9	JPN; Ret	NED; 6	NED; 10	ITA; Ret	ITA; 8	GBR; 5	GBR; 8	POR; 2	POR; 10	6th	184.5
1994	Kawasaki	GBR; 7	GBR; Ret	GER; DNS	GER; Ret	ITA; Ret	ITA; 7	SPA; 4	SPA; 6	AUT; 11	AUT; 9	INA; 11	INA; 11	JPN; 12	JPN; 17	NED; Ret	NED; DSQ	SMR; 10	SMR; 6	EUR; 6	EUR; 7	AUS; 9	AUS; 9					8th	116
1995	Kawasaki	GER; 11	GER; 14	SMR; 8	SMR; 5	GBR; 5	GBR; 4	ITA; 7	ITA; Ret	SPA; 5	SPA; Ret	AUT; 10	AUT; 8	USA; 13	USA; 11	EUR; 13	EUR; 14	JPN; 14	JPN; 13	NED; 12	NED; 9	INA; 11	INA; 8	AUS; 12	AUS; 8			12th	138
1996	Kawasaki	SMR; 10	SMR; 10	GBR; 10	GBR; 11	GER; 12	GER; 13	ITA; Ret	ITA; DNS	CZE; 18	CZE; 16	USA; 13	USA; 16	EUR; 13	EUR; 9	INA; 11	INA; 12	JPN; 22	JPN; 20	NED; 15	NED; Ret	SPA; 13	SPA; 13	AUS; 12	AUS; Ret			15th	63
1997	Kawasaki	AUS; Ret	AUS; 10	SMR; 8	SMR; Ret	GBR; 11	GBR; Ret	GER; 11	GER; 11	ITA; 9	ITA; 6	USA; 9	USA; 7	EUR; 8	EUR; 12	AUT; 9	AUT; 5	NED; Ret	NED; 10	SPA; 6	SPA; 6	JPN; Ret	JPN; Ret	INA; DNS	INA; DNS			10th	118
1998	Kawasaki	AUS; 12	AUS; Ret	GBR; 14	GBR; 13	ITA; Ret	ITA; 11	SPA; 12	SPA; 6	GER; 8	GER; 9	SMR; Ret	SMR; 11	RSA; 12	RSA; 10	USA; 18	USA; DNS	EUR	EUR	AUT	AUT	NED	NED	JPN	JPN			13th	58
2004	Suzuki	SPA; 15	SPA; 16	AUS; NC	AUS; 11	SMR; 9	SMR; 15	ITA; 10	ITA; 11	GER; 14	GER; 11	GBR; 9	GBR; 14	USA; 13	USA; 12	EUR; 15	EUR; 12	NED; 13	NED; 12	ITA; 13	ITA; Ret	FRA; 11	FRA; Ret					15th	68

=== Supersport World Championship ===
==== Races by year ====
Year	Team	1	2	3	4	5	6	7	8	9	10	11	12	Pos.	Pts
1999	Yamaha	RSA; 14	GBR; 6	SPA; 2	**ITA**; 3	GER; 1	SMR; 7	USA; 6	EUR; 4	AUT; 5	NED; Ret	GER		3rd	116
2000	Ducati	AUS; Ret	JPN; 9	GBR; 14	ITA; 11	GER; 16	SMR; 9	SPA; 7	EUR; Ret	NED; 5	GER; 6	**GBR**; Ret		12th	51
2001	Yamaha	SPA; 2	AUS; 14	JPN; Ret	ITA; 9	GBR; 6	GER; Ret	SMR; 10	EUR; Ret	GER; 14	NED; 12	ITA; 9		11th	58
2002	Ducati	SPA; 11	AUS; 2	RSA; 11	JPN; Ret	ITA; 7	GBR; Ret	GER; 9	SMR; 14	GBR; Ret	GER; Ret	NED; 13	ITA; Ret	13th	51
2005	Ducati	QAT	AUS	SPA	ITA	EUR	SMR; 20	CZE	GBR	NED	GER	ITA	FRA	NC	0

=== FIM Endurance World Championship ===
Year	Bike	Rider	TC
1996	Kawasaki	(Italy) Piergiorgio Bontempi	3rd
