= 1999 Supersport World Championship =

1999 Supersport World Championship
Previous:	1998	Next:	2000
Support series: Superbike World Championship; Superstock European Championship

The 1999 Supersport World Championship was the first season of the Supersport World Championship, the third taking into account the previous two seasons, when the competition was known as Supersport World Series. For the first year, the series was recognised by the FIM as a World Championship instead of as an FIM Prize.

The season began on 28 March at Kyalami and finished on 12 September at Hockenheimring after 11 rounds. South African rider Brett MacLeod had a fatal accident at the Kyalami race. Stéphane Chambon won the riders' championship and Yamaha won the manufacturers' championship.

== Race calendar and results ==
Round	Country	Circuit	Date	Pole position	Fastest lap	Winning rider	Winning team	Report
1	South Africa	Kyalami	28 March	(Spain) Rubén Xaus	(United Kingdom) Iain MacPherson	(United Kingdom) Iain MacPherson	Kawasaki Racing Team	Report
2	United Kingdom	Donington Park	2 May	(Italy) Paolo Casoli	(United Kingdom) James Whitham	(United Kingdom) James Whitham	Yamaha Belgarda	Report
3	Spain	Albacete	16 May	(United Kingdom) Iain MacPherson	(Spain) Pere Riba	(Germany) Jörg Teuchert	Yamaha Deutschland	Report
4	Italy	Monza	30 May	(Italy) Piergiorgio Bontempi	(Germany) Christian Kellner	(Netherlands) Wilco Zeelenberg	Dee Cee Jeans Yamaha	Report
5	Germany	Nürburgring	13 June	(Germany) Jörg Teuchert	(Italy) Piergiorgio Bontempi	(Italy) Piergiorgio Bontempi	Yamaha Belgarda	Report
6	San Marino	Misano	27 June	(Italy) Massimo Meregalli	(Italy) Paolo Casoli	(Spain) Rubén Xaus	Dee Cee Jeans Yamaha	Report
7	United States	Laguna Seca	11 July	(France) Stéphane Chambon	(France) Stéphane Chambon	(France) Stéphane Chambon	Suzuki Alstare F.S.	Report
8	Europe	Brands Hatch	1 August	(France) Stéphane Chambon	(France) Stéphane Chambon	(France) Stéphane Chambon	Suzuki Alstare F.S.	Report
9	Austria	A1-Ring	29 August	(Spain) Rubén Xaus	(Italy) Massimo Meregalli	(Germany) Jörg Teuchert	Yamaha Deutschland	Report
10	Netherlands	Assen	5 September	(United Kingdom) Iain MacPherson	(United Kingdom) Iain MacPherson	(United Kingdom) Iain MacPherson	Kawasaki Racing Team	Report
11	Germany	Hockenheimring	12 September	(France) Stéphane Chambon	(United Kingdom) Iain MacPherson	(United Kingdom) Iain MacPherson	Kawasaki Racing Team	Report

== Entry list ==
Team	Constructor	Motorcycle	No.	Rider	Rounds
Bimota Exp. D.N.R.	Bimota	Bimota SB6R	27	(Italy) Roberto Panichi	All
Bimota Exp. D.N.R.	Bimota	Bimota SB6R	43	(Italy) Norino Brignola	1–6, 8–10
Desenzano Corse	Ducati	Ducati 748R	18	(Italy) Camillo Mariottini	10
Desenzano Corse	Ducati	Ducati 748R	18	(Italy) Camillo Mariottini	11
Desenzano Corse	Ducati	Ducati 748R	57	(Italy) Fabio Carpani	1–6, 8–10
DF Racing Carli D.	Ducati	Ducati 748R	26	(Italy) Roberto Teneggi	1–6, 8–11
Ducati France Racing	Ducati	Ducati 748R	39	(France) David Muscat	2, 4–5, 8
Ducati France Racing	Ducati	Ducati 748R	83	(France) Gérald Muteau	10–11
Ducati Performance	Ducati	Ducati 748R	4	(Italy) Paolo Casoli	1–7, 11
Ducati Performance	Ducati	Ducati 748R	91	(United States) Larry Pegram	9–10
Ducati Performance	Ducati	Ducati 748R	91	(United States) Larry Pegram	11
GIBI Team	Ducati	Ducati 748R	66	(Italy) Luca Pasini	6
Motorrad Ducati	Ducati	Ducati 748R	58	(Spain) Alex Sirera	3
Red Devils Romanelli	Ducati	Ducati 748R	55	(Italy) Michele Malatesta	1–4, 6–7
Team Ghelfi	Ducati	Ducati 748R	29	(Italy) Davide Bulega	1–5
Team Ghelfi	Ducati	Ducati 748R	46	(Italy) Mauro Sanchini	1–5
Team Ghelfi	Ducati	Ducati 748R	49	(Italy) Mario Innamorati	8–9
Team Ghelfi	Ducati	Ducati 748R	69	(Italy) Serafino Foti	6–11
Team Yes Ducati NCR	Ducati	Ducati 748R	29	(Italy) Davide Bulega	6
Team Yes Ducati NCR	Ducati	Ducati 748R	42	(Spain) David Checa	All
Team Yes Ducati NCR	Ducati	Ducati 748R	49	(Italy) Mario Innamorati	5
Team Yes Ducati NCR	Ducati	Ducati 748R	55	(Italy) Michele Malatesta	8–9
Team Yes Ducati NCR	Ducati	Ducati 748R	62	(Italy) Ivo Bellezza	4
Team Yes Ducati NCR	Ducati	Ducati 748R	69	(Italy) Serafino Foti	1–3
Team Yes Ducati NCR	Ducati	Ducati 748R	77	(South Africa) Greg Dreyer	10
X racing	Ducati	Ducati 748R	24	(Italy) Francesco Monaco	1–6, 8–11
Autopage Cellular	Honda	Honda CBR600F	50	(South Africa) Greg Dreyer	1
Autopage Cellular	Honda	Honda CBR600F	54	(South Africa) Graeme Van Breda	1
Castrol Honda	Honda	Honda CBR600F	17	(Spain) Pere Riba	1–6, 8–11
Castrol Honda	Honda	Honda CBR600F	52	(United Kingdom) James Toseland	All
Castrol Honda	Honda	Honda CBR600F	61	(United Kingdom) Jim Moodie	2
Castrol Honda	Honda	Honda CBR600F	62/77	(Australia) Karl Muggeridge	2, 8
Castrol Honda	Honda	Honda CBR600F	77	(United Kingdom) James Ellison	7
D & E Racing	Honda	Honda CBR600F	76	(United Kingdom) Paul Brown	8
Hartelman Motoren	Honda	Honda CBR600F	64	(Netherlands) Torleif Hartelman	10
Honda Austria	Honda	Honda CBR600F	80	(Austria) Christian Zaiser	9
Honda Portugal Garp	Honda	Honda CBR600F	48	(Portugal) Felisberto Teixeira	3–11
Napa Valley Racing	Honda	Honda CBR600F	61	(United States) Brian Parriott	7
Performance Bikes	Honda	Honda CBR600F	63	(United Kingdom) Ian Simpson	2
Philippe Coulon	Honda	Honda CBR600F	44	(Switzerland) Claude–Alain Jaggi	1–5, 8, 10–11
Sanyo Honda	Honda	Honda CBR600F	74	(United Kingdom) Steve Plater	8
Speedy Bike Racing	Honda	Honda CBR600F	68	(Italy) Alberto Conti	6
Superloans.com	Honda	Honda CBR600F	59	(United States) Tony Doran	7
Team Garella – Rumi	Honda	Honda CBR600F	58	(Australia) Warwick Nowland	8
Team Garella – Rumi	Honda	Honda CBR600F	86	(Italy) Massimiliano Marchini	6
Team Garella – Rumi	Honda	Honda CBR600F	87	(United States) Tripp Nobles	1–2, 4
Team Elf Honda France	Honda	Honda CBR600F	16	(France) Sébastien Charpentier	All
Team Elf Honda France	Honda	Honda CBR600F	25	(France) William Costes	All
Team Rumi	Honda	Honda CBR600F	37	(Italy) Marco Borciani	1–2, 4–11
Ten Kate Arbizu	Honda	Honda CBR600F	32	(Spain) José David de Gea	1–6, 8
Ten Kate Arbizu	Honda	Honda CBR600F	76	(Australia) Karl Muggeridge	10–11
Kawasaki Racing Team	Kawasaki	Kawasaki ZX-6R	12	(United Kingdom) Iain MacPherson	All
Kawasaki Team Italia	Kawasaki	Kawasaki ZX-6R	15	(Italy) Marco Risitano	10–11
Kawasaki Team Italia	Kawasaki	Kawasaki ZX-6R	18	(Italy) Camillo Mariottini	1–9
Kawasaki Team Italia	Kawasaki	Kawasaki ZX-6R	33	(Italy) Luca Conforti	1–9
Kawasaki Team Italia	Kawasaki	Kawasaki ZX-6R	79	(Italy) Ferdinando Di Maso	10–11
MotoPort Druten	Kawasaki	Kawasaki ZX-6R	59	(Netherlands) Mile Pajic	10
MotoPort Druten	Kawasaki	Kawasaki ZX-6R	94	(Netherlands) Jarno Boesveld	10
Shell Kawasaki Speed	Kawasaki	Kawasaki ZX-6R	53	(South Africa) Brad Anassis	1
Team Hinterreiter	Kawasaki	Kawasaki ZX-6R	79	(Austria) Thomas Hinterreiter	9
Alpha Technik Suzuki	Suzuki	Suzuki GSX-R600	70	(Germany) Jürgen Oelschläger	5
Alpha Technik Suzuki	Suzuki	Suzuki GSX-R600	71	(Germany) Markus Barth	5
Alstare Suzuki	Suzuki	Suzuki GSX-R600	1	(Italy) Fabrizio Pirovano	1–9, 11
Alstare Suzuki	Suzuki	Suzuki GSX-R600	3	(France) Stéphane Chambon	All
Alstare Suzuki	Suzuki	Suzuki GSX-R600	93	(Australia) Martin Craggil	10
Bike Suzuki	Suzuki	Suzuki GSX-R600	65	(Netherlands) Kyro Verstraeten	10
Clarion Suzuki	Suzuki	Suzuki GSX-R600	60	(United Kingdom) John Crawford	2, 8
Dealer Elf Suzuki	Suzuki	Suzuki GSX-R600	56	(South Africa) Stewart MacLeod	1
Dealer Elf Suzuki	Suzuki	Suzuki GSX-R600	58	(South Africa) Brett MacLeod	1
Endoug Metalsistem	Suzuki	Suzuki GSX-R600	6	(Italy) Cristiano Migliorati	All
Endoug Metalsistem	Suzuki	Suzuki GSX-R600	34	(Switzerland) Yves Briguet	1–6, 9
Endoug Metalsistem	Suzuki	Suzuki GSX-R600	74	(United Kingdom) Karl Harris	7–8, 10–11
Frankovics Suzuki	Suzuki	Suzuki GSX-R600	72	(Germany) Stefan Scheschowitsch	5
Gi Motor Sport	Suzuki	Suzuki GSX-R600	19	(Italy) Walter Tortoroglio	3–11
Gi Motor Sport	Suzuki	Suzuki GSX-R600	49	(Italy) Mario Innamorati	1
Gi Motor Sport	Suzuki	Suzuki GSX-R600	64	(Italy) Guido Carnevale	4
Sacchi Corse	Suzuki	Suzuki GSX-R600	15	(Italy) Marco Risitano	5
Sacchi Corse	Suzuki	Suzuki GSX-R600	19	(Italy) Walter Tortoroglio	1–2
Sacchi Corse	Suzuki	Suzuki GSX-R600	46	(Italy) Mauro Sanchini	6–11
Sacchi Corse	Suzuki	Suzuki GSX-R600	88	(United Kingdom) Scott Smart	4
Still Moto	Suzuki	Suzuki GSX-R600	59	(Spain) Fernando Cristobal	3
Suzuki Motothek	Suzuki	Suzuki GSX-R600	73	(Germany) Thomas Körner	5
Team Monza Corse	Suzuki	Suzuki GSX-R600	30	(Italy) Giuseppe Fiorillo	2–6
Team Monza Corse	Suzuki	Suzuki GSX-R600	33	(Italy) Luca Conforti	11
Team Monza Corse	Suzuki	Suzuki GSX-R600	38	(Sweden) Jan Hanson	1
Team Monza Corse	Suzuki	Suzuki GSX-R600	50	(Italy) Andrea Giachino	8–10
Van Sommeren Suzuki	Suzuki	Suzuki GSX-R600	92	(Netherlands) Luc Tijssen	10
2–Rad–Ginzinger	Yamaha	Yamaha YZF-R6	81	(Austria) Fredrik Haslinger	9
BKM Racing Team	Yamaha	Yamaha YZF-R6	15	(Italy) Marco Risitano	1–2
BKM Racing Team	Yamaha	Yamaha YZF-R6	35	(France) Christophe Cogan	All
BKM Racing Team	Yamaha	Yamaha YZF-R6	50	(Australia) Dean Thomas	3
BKM Racing Team	Yamaha	Yamaha YZF-R6	56	(France) Fabien Foret	8–10
BKM Racing Team	Yamaha	Yamaha YZF-R6	88	(Belgium) Albert Aerts	6
BKM Racing Team	Yamaha	Yamaha YZF-R6	89	(Germany) Rico Penzkofer	4–5
BKM Racing Team	Yamaha	Yamaha YZF-R6	95	(Belgium) Marc Fissette	11
BNT Racing	Yamaha	Yamaha YZF-R6	66	(Italy) Igor Antonelli	4, 6, 9, 11
Dee Cee Jeans Yamaha	Yamaha	Yamaha YZF-R6	8	(Netherlands) Wilco Zeelenberg	All
Dee Cee Jeans Yamaha	Yamaha	Yamaha YZF-R6	23	(Spain) Rubén Xaus	All
Eac. Castro	Yamaha	Yamaha YZF-R6	56	(Spain) Juan Enrique Maturana	3
First Nation Yamaha	Yamaha	Yamaha YZF-R6	78	(Australia) Glen Richards	8
Karthin Rennsport	Yamaha	Yamaha YZF-R6	68	(Germany) Harry Nickel	11
Lorenzini by Leoni	Yamaha	Yamaha YZF-R6	31	(Italy) Vittorio Iannuzzo	All
Lozano Racing	Yamaha	Yamaha YZF-R6	28	(Spain) Guilherme Roda	1
Lozano Racing	Yamaha	Yamaha YZF-R6	28	(Spain) David Vázquez	3–4
Lozano Racing	Yamaha	Yamaha YZF-R6	40	(Belgium) Albert Aerts	2
Lozano Racing	Yamaha	Yamaha YZF-R6	75	(Netherlands) Wim Theunissen	10–11
Lozano Racing	Yamaha	Yamaha YZF-R6	90	(Spain) Iñigo Sánchez	7–8
Lozano Racing	Yamaha	Yamaha YZF-R6	99	(France) Edgar Mahe	9
Motorrad B&S	Yamaha	Yamaha YZF-R6	66	(Germany) Maik Stief	11
Nashua Yamaha	Yamaha	Yamaha YZF-R6	51	(South Africa) Russell Wood	1
Start Team	Yamaha	Yamaha YZF-R6	67	(Italy) Andrea Mazzali	6
Saveko Racing	Yamaha	Yamaha YZF-R6	62	(Netherlands) Harry Van Beek	10
Team Folch	Yamaha	Yamaha YZF-R6	53	(Spain) Javier Rodríguez	3
Team Folch	Yamaha	Yamaha YZF-R6	61	(Spain) Eduard Ullastres	3
Tienne Racing	Yamaha	Yamaha YZF-R6	67	(Italy) Maurizio Prattichizzo	4
Vitellaro Team	Yamaha	Yamaha YZF-R6	65	(Italy) Antonio Vitellaro	4
Yamaha Austria	Yamaha	Yamaha YZF-R6	73	(Austria) Horst Saiger	9
Yamaha Austria	Yamaha	Yamaha YZF-R6	82	(Austria) Michael Wohner	9
Yamaha Belgarda	Yamaha	Yamaha YZF-R6	5	(Italy) Massimo Meregalli	1, 4–11
Yamaha Belgarda	Yamaha	Yamaha YZF-R6	7	(Italy) Piergiorgio Bontempi	1–10
Yamaha Belgarda	Yamaha	Yamaha YZF-R6	45	(United Kingdom) James Whitham	2
Yamaha Belgium	Yamaha	Yamaha YZF-R6	20	(Belgium) Werner Daemen	All
Yamaha Deutschland	Yamaha	Yamaha YZF-R6	21	(Germany) Jörg Teuchert	All
Yamaha Deutschland	Yamaha	Yamaha YZF-R6	22	(Germany) Christian Kellner	All

Key
Regular rider
Wildcard rider
Replacement rider

== Championship standings ==
=== Riders' championship ===
Pos.	Rider	Bike	RSA (South Africa)	GBR (United Kingdom)	SPA (Spain)	ITA (Italy)	GER (Germany)	SMR (San Marino)	USA (United States)	EUR (Europe)	AUT (Austria)	NED (Netherlands)	GER (Germany)	Pts
1	(France) Stéphane Chambon	Suzuki	2	2	4	12	8	5	**1**	**1**	Ret	5	**3**	153
2	(United Kingdom) Iain MacPherson	Kawasaki	1	3	**Ret**	Ret	10	Ret	2	Ret	4	**1**	1	130
3	(Italy) Piergiorgio Bontempi	Yamaha	14	6	2	**3**	1	7	6	4	5	Ret		116
4	(Germany) Jörg Teuchert	Yamaha	3	4	1	Ret	**Ret**	6	Ret	Ret	1	8	5	108
5	(Spain) Rubén Xaus	Yamaha	**Ret**	Ret	Ret	2	Ret	1	23	2	**Ret**	3	2	101
6	(Germany) Christian Kellner	Yamaha	4	11	6	11	4	11	9	6	2	Ret	10	94
7	(Italy) Fabrizio Pirovano	Suzuki	Ret	Ret	5	5	2	4	5	8	Ret		6	84
8	(Italy) Cristiano Migliorati	Suzuki	Ret	7	10	7	Ret	14	7	3	15	2	7	81
9	(Netherlands) Wilco Zeelenberg	Yamaha	8	Ret	Ret	1	14	10	8	15	3	10	9	79
10	(France) William Costes	Honda	10	5	8	6	3	12	10	12	Ret	9	15	73
11	(United Kingdom) James Toseland	Honda	6	8	11	9	13	13	11	7	Ret	7	22	59
12	(Italy) Massimo Meregalli	Yamaha	DNS			4	Ret	**3**	4	5	Ret	Ret	DNS	53
13	(Spain) Pere Riba	Honda	15	Ret	3	10	Ret	Ret		DNQ	7	6	8	50
14	(Italy) Paolo Casoli	Ducati	7	**Ret**	Ret	Ret	Ret	2	3				DNQ	45
15	(France) Christophe Cogan	Yamaha	22	Ret	14	DNS	5	Ret	14	11	Ret	13	12	27
16	(United Kingdom) James Whitham	Yamaha		1										25
17	(Switzerland) Yves Briguet	Suzuki	11	Ret	7	8	Ret	Ret			DNS			22
18	(Italy) Vittorio Iannuzzo	Yamaha	18	15	9	13	Ret	8	Ret	Ret	16	19	14	21
19	(France) Sébastien Charpentier	Honda	WD	24	23	DNQ	16	Ret	Ret	9	10	14	11	20
20	(United Kingdom) Karl Harris	Suzuki							21	Ret		11	4	18
21	(Italy) Walter Tortoroglio	Suzuki	DNQ	DNQ	15	16	6	15	Ret	Ret	Ret	16	13	15
22	(Belgium) Werner Daemen	Yamaha	Ret	18	Ret	17	Ret	21	12	16	6	Ret	19	14
23	(Australia) Karl Muggeridge	Honda		17						Ret		4	Ret	13
24	(Italy) Roberto Panichi	Bimota	19	10	12	Ret	Ret	Ret	Ret	13	Ret	Ret	Ret	13
25	(South Africa) Russell Wood	Yamaha	5											11
26	(Spain) José David de Gea	Honda	9	Ret	Ret	15	20	17		14				10
27	(Italy) Camillo Mariottini	Kawasaki	16	13	Ret	Ret	Ret	9	16	DNS	Ret			10
27	(Italy) Camillo Mariottini	Ducati										Ret	26	10
28	(Italy) Giuseppe Fiorillo	Suzuki		23	22	19	7	16						9
29	(Italy) Andrea Giachino	Suzuki								19	8	DNS		8
30	(Italy) Mauro Sanchini	Ducati	20	DNQ	DNQ	20	DNQ							7
30	(Italy) Mauro Sanchini	Suzuki						27	17	Ret	9	24	20	7
31	(Germany) Stefan Scheschowitsch	Suzuki					9							7
32	(United Kingdom) John Crawford	Suzuki		9						Ret				7
33	(United States) Larry Pegram	Ducati									13	12	Ret	7
34	(Australia) Glen Richards	Yamaha								10				6
35	(Austria) Michael Wohner	Yamaha									11			5
36	(Italy) Francesco Monaco	Ducati	21	21	17	Ret	11	18		17	Ret	23	24	5
37	(Italy) Michele Malatesta	Ducati	DNQ	22	16	Ret		24	15	Ret	12			5
38	(Italy) Roberto Teneggi	Ducati	13	14	Ret	18	DNS	Ret		Ret	Ret	Ret	16	5
39	(Germany) Markus Barth	Suzuki					12							4
40	(United Kingdom) Ian Simpson	Honda		12										4
41	(South Africa) Graeme van Breda	Honda	12											4
42	(United States) Brian Parriott	Honda							13					3
43	(Spain) Javier Rodríguez	Yamaha			13									3
44	(Italy) Igor Antonelli	Yamaha				22		20			14		18	2
45	(Italy) Norino Brignola	Bimota	23	DNQ	Ret	14	Ret	Ret		Ret	Ret	Ret		2
46	(Spain) David Checa	Ducati	17	20	18	Ret	17	25	19	Ret	DNQ	15	17	1
47	(Italy) Marco Borciani	Honda	DNQ	DNQ		24	15	DNQ	Ret	DNQ	DNQ	Ret	27	1
	(United Kingdom) Jim Moodie	Honda		16										0
	(Austria) Fredrik Haslinger	Yamaha									17			0
	(Italy) Marco Risitano	Kawasaki										17	23	0
	(Italy) Marco Risitano	Suzuki					DNQ							0
	(Italy) Marco Risitano	Yamaha	Ret	DNQ										0
	(France) Fabien Foret	Yamaha								18	Ret	18		0
	(Germany) Jürgen Oelschläger	Suzuki					18							0
	(Italy) Luca Conforti	Kawasaki	Ret	Ret	Ret	Ret	DNQ	DNQ	18	DNQ	DNQ			0
	(Italy) Luca Conforti	Suzuki											25	0
	(Italy) Andrea Mazzali	Yamaha						19						0
	(Spain) Juan Enrique Maturana	Yamaha			19									0
	(France) David Muscat	Ducati		19		Ret	Ret			Ret				0
	(Germany) Rico Penzkofer	Yamaha				DNQ	19							0
	(Netherlands) Mile Pajic	Kawasaki										20		0
	(Spain) Alex Sirera	Ducati			20									0
	(Portugal) Felibesto Teixeira	Honda			DNQ	DNQ	DNQ	DNQ	20	21	DNQ	DNQ	Ret	0
	(Belgium) Marc Fissette	Yamaha											21	0
	(Netherlands) Torleif Hartelman	Honda										21		0
	(Australia) Dean Thomas	Yamaha			21									0
	(Italy) Fabio Carpani	Ducati	DNQ	DNQ	Ret	21	DNQ	DNQ		DNQ	DNQ	DNQ		0
	(Netherlands) Harry Van Beek	Yamaha										22		0
	(United States) Tony Doran	Honda							22					0
	(Italy) Alberto Conti	Honda						22						0
	(Italy) Luca Pasini	Ducati						23						0
	(United States) Tripp Nobles	Honda	DNQ	Ret		23								0
	(Netherlands) Jarno Boesveld	Kawasaki										25		0
	(Italy) Davide Bulega	Ducati	DNS	Ret	DNQ	Ret	DNS	26						0
	(Germany) Maik Stief	Yamaha											28	0
	(South Africa) Brad Anassis	Kawasaki	DSQ											0
	(Italy) Serafino Foti	Ducati	Ret	Ret	Ret			Ret	Ret	DNQ	Ret	Ret	Ret	0
	(Netherlands) Wim Theunissen	Yamaha										Ret	Ret	0
	(Italy) Ferdinando Di Maso	Kawasaki										DNQ	Ret	0
	(France) Gérald Muteau	Ducati										DNQ	Ret	0
	(Austria) Christian Zaiser	Honda									Ret			0
	(Austria) Horst Saiger	Yamaha									Ret			0
	(Austria) Thomas Hinterreiter	Kawasaki									Ret			0
	(Spain) Iñigo Sánchez	Yamaha							Ret	DNQ				0
	(United Kingdom) Paul Brown	Honda								Ret				0
	(United Kingdom) Steve Plater	Honda								Ret				0
	(United Kingdom) James Ellison	Honda							Ret					0
	(Germany) Thomas Körner	Suzuki					Ret							0
	(Italy) Maurizio Prattichizzo	Yamaha				Ret								0
	(Spain) Eduard Ullastres	Yamaha			Ret									0
	(South Africa) Greg Dreyer	Ducati										DNQ		0
	(South Africa) Greg Dreyer	Honda	Ret											0
	(France) Edgar Mahe	Yamaha									DNS			
	(South Africa) Brett MacLeod†	Suzuki	DNS											
	(South Africa) Stewart MacLeod	Suzuki	DNS											
	(Switzerland) Claude–Alain Jaggi	Honda	DNQ	DNQ	DNQ	DNQ	DNQ			DNQ		DNQ	DNQ	
	(Germany) Harry Nickel	Yamaha											DNQ	
	(Netherlands) Kyro Verstraeten	Suzuki										DNQ		
	(Netherlands) Luc Tijssen	Suzuki										DNQ		
	(Australia) Martin Craggil	Suzuki										DNQ		
	(Italy) Mario Innamorati	Ducati					DNQ			DNQ	DNQ			
	(Italy) Mario Innamorati	Suzuki	DNQ											
	(Australia) Warwick Nowland	Honda								DNQ				
	(Belgium) Albert Aerts	Yamaha		DNQ				DNQ						
	(Italy) Massimiliano Marchini	Honda						DNQ						
	(Spain) David Vázquez	Yamaha			DNQ	DNQ								
	(Italy) Antonio Vitellaro	Yamaha				DNQ								
	(Italy) Guido Carnevale	Suzuki				DNQ								
	(Italy) Ivo Bellezza	Ducati				DNQ								
	(United Kingdom) Scott Smart	Suzuki				DNQ								
	(Spain) Fernando Cristobal	Suzuki			DNQ									
	(Spain) Guim Roda	Yamaha	DNQ											
	(Sweden) Jan Hanson	Suzuki	DNQ											
Pos.	Rider	Bike	RSA (South Africa)	GBR (United Kingdom)	SPA (Spain)	ITA (Italy)	GER (Germany)	SMR (San Marino)	USA (United States)	EUR (Europe)	AUT (Austria)	NED (Netherlands)	GER (Germany)	Pts

Colour	Result
Gold	Winner
Silver	Second place
Bronze	Third place
Green	Points classification
Blue	Non-points classification
Blue	Non-classified finish (NC)
Purple	Retired, not classified (Ret)
Red	Did not qualify (DNQ)
Red	Did not pre-qualify (DNPQ)
Black	Disqualified (DSQ)
White	Did not start (DNS)
White	Withdrew (WD)
White	Race cancelled (C)
Blank	Did not practice (DNP)
Blank	Did not arrive (DNA)
Blank	Excluded (EX)

**Bold** – Pole position
Italics – Fastest lap

=== Manufacturers' championship ===
Pos.	Manufacturer	RSA (South Africa)	GBR (United Kingdom)	SPA (Spain)	ITA (Italy)	GER (Germany)	SMR (San Marino)	USA (United States)	EUR (Europe)	AUT (Austria)	NED (Netherlands)	GER (Germany)	Pts
1	(Japan) Yamaha	3	1	1	1	1	1	4	2	1	3	2	235
2	(Japan) Suzuki	2	2	4	5	2	4	1	1	8	2	3	191
3	(Japan) Kawasaki	1	3	Ret	Ret	10	9	2	20	4	1	1	137
4	(Japan) Honda	6	5	3	6	3	12	10	7	7	4	8	112
5	(Italy) Ducati	7	14	16	18	11	2	3	17	12	12	16	60
6	(Italy) Bimota	19	10	12	14	Ret	Ret	Ret	13	Ret	Ret	Ret	15
Pos.	Manufacturer	RSA (South Africa)	GBR (United Kingdom)	SPA (Spain)	ITA (Italy)	GER (Germany)	SMR (San Marino)	USA (United States)	EUR (Europe)	AUT (Austria)	NED (Netherlands)	GER (Germany)	Pts
