= Sébastien Charpentier (motorcyclist) =

French motorcycle racer

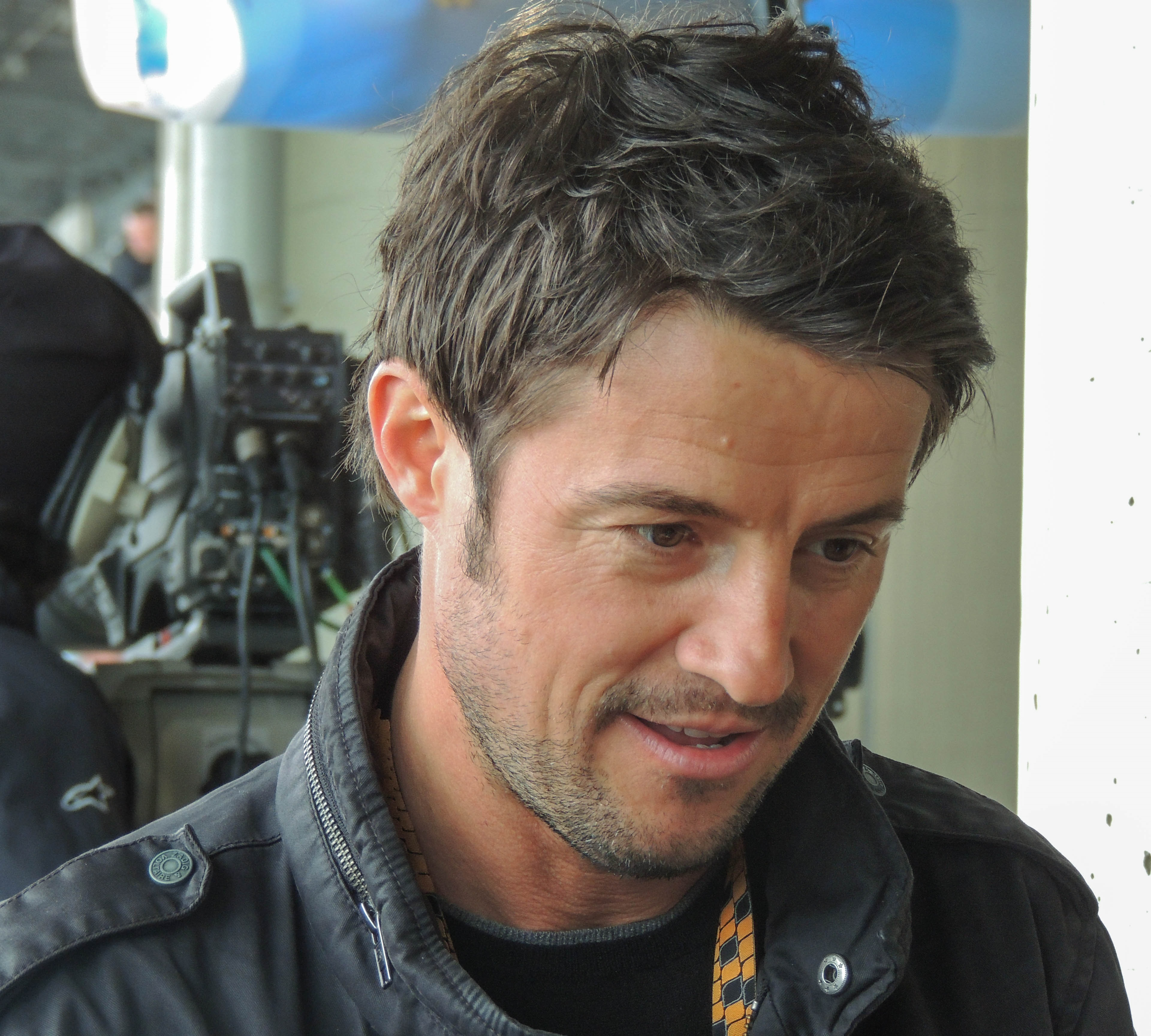
- Charpentier in 2013
- Nationality: French
- Born: 26 March 1973 (age 53); La Rochefoucauld, France
- Current team: Triumph BE1
- Bike number: 1
Motorcycle racing career statistics
Supersport World Championship
Active years	1998–2010
Manufacturers	Honda, Triumph
Championships	2 (2005, 2006)
2010 championship position
Starts / Wins / Podiums / Poles / F. laps / Points; 87 / 13 / 23 / 22 / 15 / 703

Sébastien Charpentier (born 26 March 1973 in La Rochefoucauld, Charente) is a French motorcycle road racer. He is the first man to have won the Supersport World Championship in successive years, 2005 and 2006.

Charpentier made his debut in 1996, when he won the France Honda CB500 Cup. In 1997, he participated in the Supersport European Championship, and since 1998 he has participated in Supersport World Series (that became the Supersport World Championship in 1999) with Honda. His 2006 title victory came after Yamaha Germany's Kevin Curtain crashed in the final round while looking set for the crown. He opened 2006 with a victory in Qatar and took three successive poles early in this season.

In 2000, Charpentier participated in the 24 Hours of Le Mans with William Costes and Sébastien Gimbert.

In the 2007 Supersport world championship, an injury-induced absence in some races reduced Charpentier's final standing to 11th overall, in stark contrast to his double championships victories in the previous two years. He did not race full-time in 2008 or 2009, but did race the 2009 Le Mans motorcycle race, and mentored young Honda riders Gino Rea and Maxime Berger.

For 2010, Charpentier returned to World Supersport racing with Triumph, but quit the team after just one unsuccessful race. He then joined Daffix Racing BMW for the Endurance World Championship, swapping rides with countryman Matthieu Lagrive.

== Career highlights ==
- 1996 – France Honda CB500 Cup, Champion
- 1997 – Supersport European Championship, Honda France, 1 place
- 1998 – Supersport World Series, Honda Reflex Team, 13th, 27 pts (1 win)
- 1999 – Supersport World Championship, Team Elf Honda France, 19th, 20 pts
- 2000 – Supersport World Championship, Honda France Elf
- 2001 – Supersport Spanish Championship
- 2002 – Supersport World Championship, Moto 1, 28th, 6 pts
- 2003 – Supersport World Championship, Moto 1, Team Klaffi Honda, 7th, 72 pts (1 podium)
- 2004 – Supersport World Championship, Team Klaffi Honda, 4th, 120 pts (5 podiums, 1 pole position, 1 fastest lap)
- 2005 – Supersport World Championship, Winston Ten Kate Honda, Champion, 210 pts (6 wins, 9 podiums, 10 pole positions, 8 fastest laps)
- 2006 – Supersport World Championship, Winston Ten Kate Honda, Champion, 194 pts (6 wins, 7 podiums, 8 pole positions, 4 fastest laps)
- 2007 – Supersport World Championship, Hannspree Ten Kate Honda, 11th, 51 pts (3 pole positions, 2 fastest laps)
- 2010 – Supersport World Championship, ParkinGO Triumph, 33rd, 3 pts

== Career statistics ==
=== FIM Endurance World Championship ===
==== By team ====
Year	Team	Bike	Rider	TC
2001	(France) Honda Elf	Honda VTR1000SPW	(France) Fabien Foret (France) William Costes (France) Sebastien Gimbert (France) Sébastien Charpentier	3rd

Sporting positions
Preceded by Karl Muggeridge	World Supersport Champion; 2005–2006	Succeeded by Kenan Sofuoğlu
