= Vladimir Ivanov (motorcyclist) =

Russian motorcycle racer

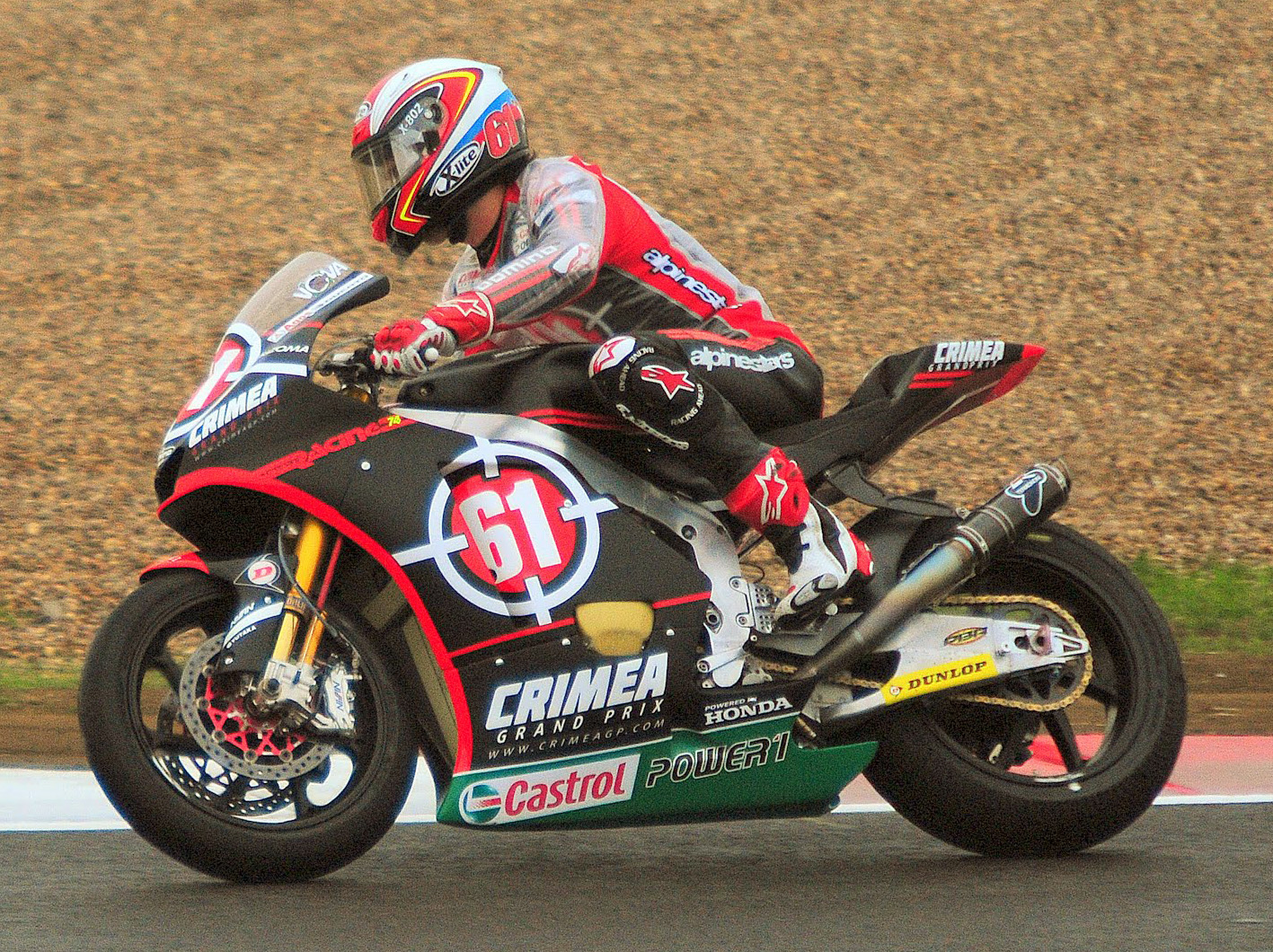
- Ivanov at the 2010 British GP
- Nationality: Russian / Ukrainian
- Born: 25 January 1983 (age 43); Saint Petersburg, Soviet Union
- Website: vovan60.com
Motorcycle racing career statistics
Moto2 World Championship
Active years	2010
Manufacturers	Moriwaki
Starts / Wins / Podiums / Poles / F. laps / Points; 15 / 0 / 0 / 0 / 0 / 2
Supersport World Championship
Active years	2006–2007, 2011, 2013
Manufacturers	Yamaha, Honda, Kawasaki
Starts / Wins / Podiums / Poles / F. laps / Points; 39 / 0 / 0 / 0 / 0 / 30

Vladimir Anatolyevich Ivanov (Russian: Владимир Анатольевич Иванов) is a Russian professional Grand Prix motorcycle racer. In 2010, and 2011 he raced under a Ukrainian racing license. In 2013, he raced in the Supersport World Championship for Kawasaki DMC-Lorenzini Team.

== Career statistics ==
=== Supersport World Championship ===
==== By season ====
Season	Motorcycle	Team	Number	Race	Win	Podium	Pole	FLap	Pts	Plcd
2006	Yamaha YZF-R6	Vector Racing	60	12	0	0	0	0	0	NC
2007	Yamaha YZF-R6	Vector Racing Team	60	12	0	0	0	0	0	NC
2011	Honda CBR600RR	Step Racing Team	60	9	0	0	0	0	12	20th
2013	Kawasaki Ninja ZX-6R	Kawasaki DMC-Lorenzini Team	6	6	0	0	0	0	18	21st
Total				39	0	0	0	0	30	

=== Grand Prix racing ===
==== By season ====
Season	Class	Motorcycle	Team	Number	Race	Win	Podium	Pole	FLap	Pts	Plcd
2010	Moto2	Moriwaki MD600	Gresini Racing Moto2	61	15	0	0	0	0	2	37th
Total					15	0	0	0	0	2	

==== Races by year ====
(key)

Year	Class	Bike	1	2	3	4	5	6	7	8	9	10	11	12	13	14	15	16	17	Pos.	Pts
2010	Moto2	Moriwaki	QAT; 26	SPA; 23	FRA; 21	ITA; Ret	GBR; 19	NED; 21	CAT; 18	GER; 14	CZE; 27	INP; Ret	RSM	ARA	JPN; 32	MAL; Ret	AUS; 29	POR; 25	VAL; 29	37th	2
