= Gianluca Nannelli =

Italian motorcycle racer (born 1973)

Gianluca Nannelli (born August 22, 1973 in Florence) is an Italian former motorcycle racer, winner of the Italian Supersport championship in 2003.

== Career statistics ==
=== CIV Championship (Campionato Italiano Velocita) ===
==== Races by year ====
(key) (Races in bold indicate pole position; races in italics indicate fastest lap)

Year	Class	Bike	1	2	3	4	5	Pos	Pts
2002	Supersport	Ducati	IMO; Ret	VAL; 3	MUG; 6	MIS1; Ret	MIS2; Ret	9th	26
