= Ducati 749 =

Ducati 749 Ducati 749S Ducati 749R Ducati 749 Dark
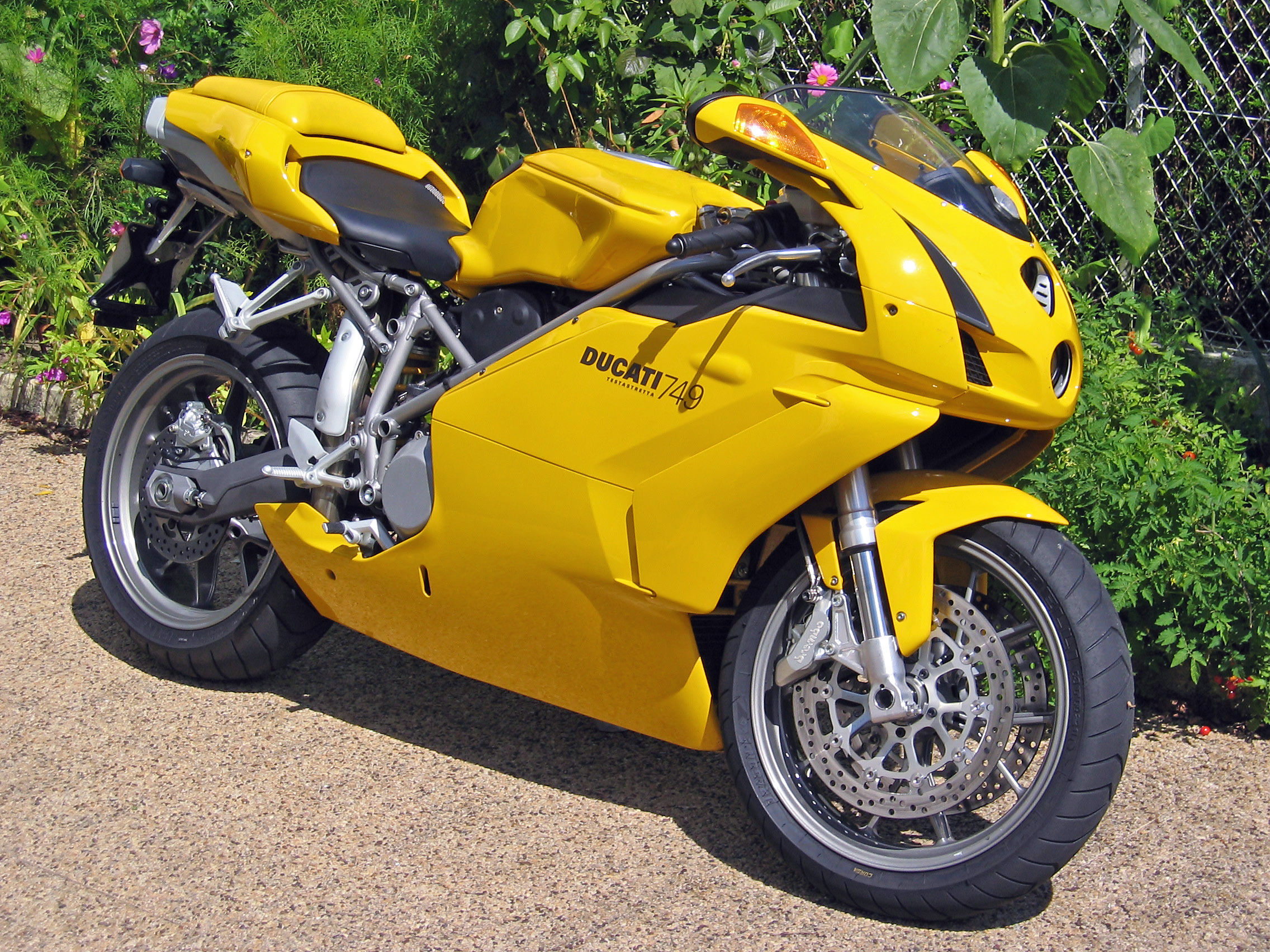
- Manufacturer: Ducati
- Production: 2003–2007
- Predecessor: Ducati 748
- Successor: Ducati 848
- Class: Sport bike
- Engine: 748 cc (45.6 cu in) (S, Dark) 749 cc (45.7 cu in) (R) desmodromic 8 valve liquid-cooled 90° V-twin
- Bore / stroke: 90 mm × 58.8 mm (3.54 in × 2.31 in) (749, Dark, S); 94 mm × 54 mm (3.7 in × 2.1 in) (R)
- Compression ratio: 11.7:1 (749); 12.3:1 (S); 12.7:1 (R)
- Power: 79.4–86.5 kilowatts (106.5–116.0 bhp; 108.0–117.6 PS) @ 10,000 rpm
- Torque: 60–62.2 pound-feet (81.3–84.3 N⋅m) @ 8,250 rpm
- Transmission: Six speed manual, dry multiplate clutch, chain final drive
- Frame type: Tubular steel trellis
- Brakes: Front: Twin 320 mm (13 in) semi-floating discs, four-piston caliper Rear: 240 mm disc, two-piston caliper
- Tires: 120/70 ZR 17 front; 180/55 ZR 17 rear
- Rake, trail: 23.5° or 24.5 (749S)
- Wheelbase: 1,420 mm (55.9 in)
- Dimensions: L: 2,095 mm (82.5 in); W: 730 mm (28.7 in)
- Seat height: 780 mm (30.7 in)
- Weight: 199 kg (439 lb) (dry)
- Fuel capacity: 15.5 L (3.4 imp gal; 4.1 US gal); 18.3 L (4.0 imp gal; 4.8 US gal) (749R)
- Related: Ducati 999

The Ducati 749 is a 90° V-twin Desmodromic valve actuated engine sport bike built by Ducati Motor Holding between 2003 and 2007. Designed by Pierre Terblanche, the 749 was available as the 749, 749 Dark, 749S, and 749R. It shared many of its parts with the 999, with the exception of a slightly smaller 180/55 profile rear tire, smaller cylinders, and different cylinder heads, giving it a smaller displacement of 748 cc. This smaller engine is higher revving and produces a lower peak horsepower than the larger engine used in the 999.

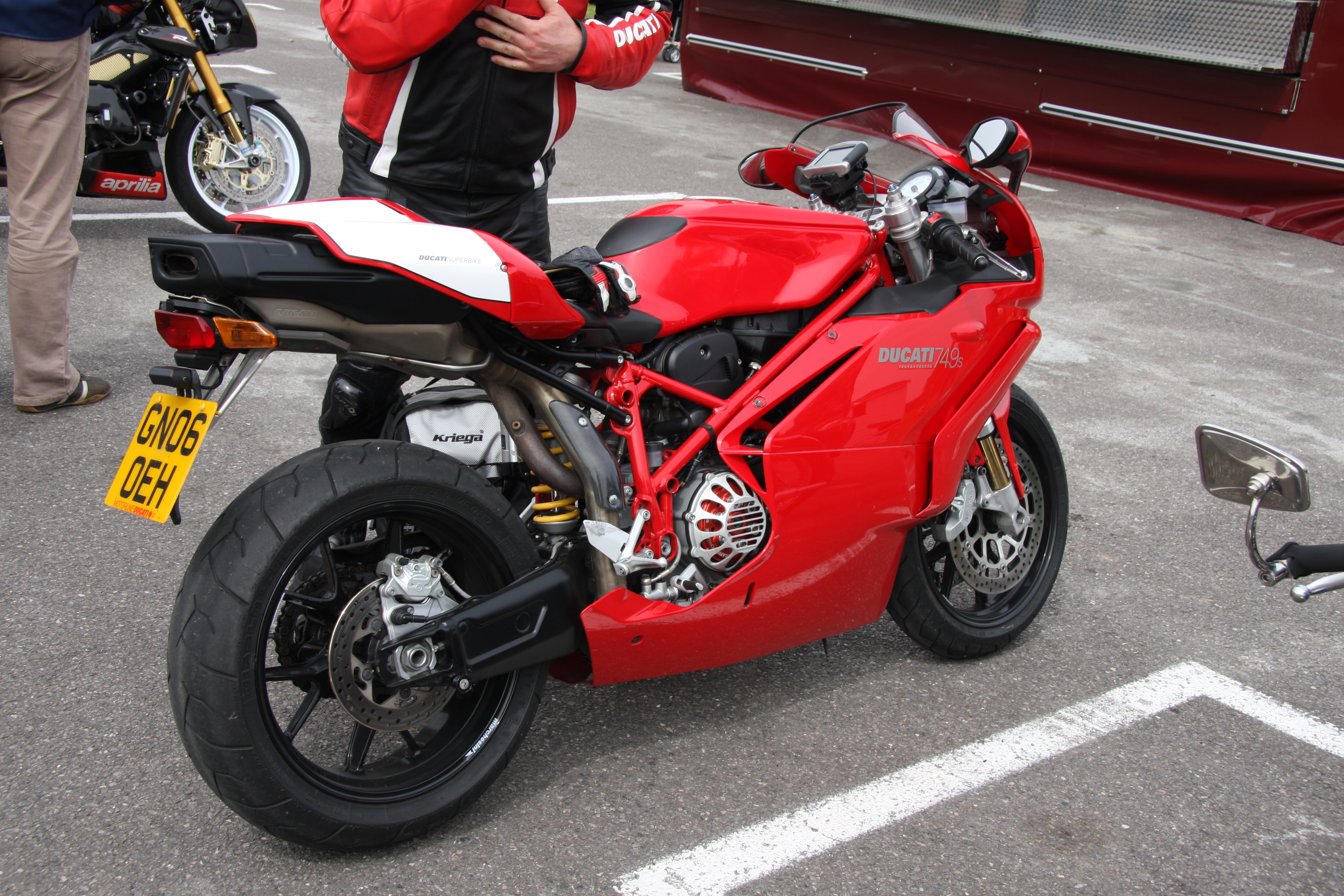
Ducati 749S

The 749S model, like the 999, incorporates features rarely found on production motorcycles, including adjustable rake (23.5° or 24.5°) and five-position adjustable rearset mounts.

A limited number of the 749 were manufactured as a race version — the 749R — each with their production number stamped on the triple clamp – and initially cost almost twice the original 749 base model. This race model was lighter, had a shorter stroke, increased bore and larger valves which allowed it to run more efficiently at higher RPM, and hence, produced more torque and power than the 749/S models. The 749R also came with a larger fuel tank (18.3 L or 4.0 imp gal or 4.8 US gal); slipper clutch; Öhlins forks, shock and steering damper; racing cams; titanium valves, valve guides, and connecting rods; magnesium head covers, and carbon fiber belt covers. Its 2004 model had carbon fiber fairings.

The 749 was replaced by the Ducati 848 for the 2008 model year.

== Specifications ==
=== Chassis ===
- Front suspension: Showa 43 mm upside-down fully adjustable fork
- Front wheel travel: 125 mm (4.9 in)
- Front wheel: Y-shaped 5-spoke light alloy 3.50 x 17
- Rear suspension: Progressive linkage with fully adjustable Sachs monoshock
- Rear wheel travel: 128 mm (5.0 in)
- Rear wheel: Y-shaped 5-spoke light alloy 5.50 x 17
- Instruments: Speedometer, tachometer, high beam indicator, turn signals, oil pressure warning light, low fuel warning light, neutral light, water temperature, outside temperature gauge, fuel consumption, battery voltage, immobilizer system
- Versions: Biposto & Monoposto

=== Transmission ===
- Gearbox: 6 speed
- Ratios: 1st 37/15, 2nd 30/17, 3rd 28/20, 4th 26/22, 5th 24/23, 6th 23/24
- Primary drive: Straight cut gears; ratio 1.84
- Final drive: Chain; Front sprocket 14; Rear sprocket 39
- Clutch: Dry multiplate with hydraulic control
