= 1999 Superbike World Championship =

1999 Superbike World Championship
Previous:	1998	Next:	2000
Support series: Supersport World Championship; Superstock European Championship

The 1999 Superbike World Championship was the twelfth FIM Superbike World Championship season. The season started on 28 March at Kyalami and finished on 10 October at Sugo after 13 rounds.

Carl Fogarty won the riders' championship, his fourth and final, and Ducati won the manufacturers' championship.

== Race calendar and results ==
1999 Superbike World Championship Calendar
Round		Country	Circuit	Date	Superpole	Fastest lap	Winning rider	Winning team	Report
1	R1	South Africa	Kyalami Grand Prix Circuit	28 March	(Australia) Troy Corser	(United States) Colin Edwards	(United Kingdom) Carl Fogarty	Ducati Performance	Report
1	R2	South Africa	Kyalami Grand Prix Circuit	28 March	(Australia) Troy Corser	(United Kingdom) Carl Fogarty	(United Kingdom) Carl Fogarty	Ducati Performance	Report
2	R1	Australia	Phillip Island Grand Prix Circuit	18 April	(Australia) Troy Corser	(United Kingdom) Carl Fogarty	(Australia) Troy Corser	Ducati Performance	Report
2	R2	Australia	Phillip Island Grand Prix Circuit	18 April	(Australia) Troy Corser	(Australia) Troy Corser	(Australia) Troy Corser	Ducati Performance	Report
3	R1	(United Kingdom) Great Britain	Donington Park	2 May	(Italy) Pierfrancesco Chili	(United Kingdom) Carl Fogarty	(United Kingdom) Carl Fogarty	Ducati Performance	Report
3	R2	(United Kingdom) Great Britain	Donington Park	2 May	(Italy) Pierfrancesco Chili	(United States) Colin Edwards	(United States) Colin Edwards	Castrol Honda	Report
4	R1	Spain	Circuito de Albacete	16 May	(United Kingdom) Carl Fogarty	(Japan) Akira Yanagawa	(Japan) Noriyuki Haga	Yamaha WSBK Team	Report
4	R2	Spain	Circuito de Albacete	16 May	(United Kingdom) Carl Fogarty	(United States) Colin Edwards	(United States) Colin Edwards	Castrol Honda	Report
5	R1	Italy	Autodromo Nazionale di Monza	30 May	(United States) Colin Edwards	(Australia) Troy Corser	(United Kingdom) Carl Fogarty	Ducati Performance	Report
5	R2	Italy	Autodromo Nazionale di Monza	30 May	(United States) Colin Edwards	(Italy) Pierfrancesco Chili	(United Kingdom) Carl Fogarty	Ducati Performance	Report
6	R1	Germany	Nürburgring	13 June	(United Kingdom) Carl Fogarty	(United Kingdom) Carl Fogarty	(United Kingdom) Carl Fogarty	Ducati Performance	Report
6	R2	Germany	Nürburgring	13 June	(United Kingdom) Carl Fogarty	(Australia) Troy Corser	(Australia) Troy Corser	Ducati Performance	Report
7	R1	San Marino	Misano World Circuit	27 June	(United Kingdom) Carl Fogarty	(New Zealand) Aaron Slight	(United Kingdom) Carl Fogarty	Ducati Performance	Report
7	R2	San Marino	Misano World Circuit	27 June	(United Kingdom) Carl Fogarty	(Australia) Troy Corser	(United Kingdom) Carl Fogarty	Ducati Performance	Report
8	R1	United States	Laguna Seca Raceway	11 July	(Australia) Troy Corser	(Australia) Anthony Gobert	(Australia) Anthony Gobert	Vance & Hines Ducati	Report
8	R2	United States	Laguna Seca Raceway	11 July	(Australia) Troy Corser	(Australia) Troy Corser	(United States) Ben Bostrom	Vance & Hines Ducati	Report
9	R1	Europe	Brands Hatch	1 August	(United Kingdom) Carl Fogarty	(Australia) Troy Corser	(United States) Colin Edwards	Castrol Honda	Report
9	R2	Europe	Brands Hatch	1 August	(United Kingdom) Carl Fogarty	(New Zealand) Aaron Slight	(United States) Colin Edwards	Castrol Honda	Report
10	R1	Austria	A1-Ring	29 August	(United States) Colin Edwards	(Italy) Pierfrancesco Chili	(United States) Colin Edwards	Castrol Honda	Report
10	R2	Austria	A1-Ring	29 August	(United States) Colin Edwards	(Italy) Pierfrancesco Chili	(Italy) Pierfrancesco Chili	Alstare Suzuki	Report
11	R1	Netherlands	TT Circuit Assen	5 September	(Australia) Troy Corser	(United Kingdom) Carl Fogarty	(United Kingdom) Carl Fogarty	Ducati Performance	Report
11	R2	Netherlands	TT Circuit Assen	5 September	(Australia) Troy Corser	(United Kingdom) Carl Fogarty	(United Kingdom) Carl Fogarty	Ducati Performance	Report
12	R1	Germany	Hockenheimring	12 September	(New Zealand) Aaron Slight	(United Kingdom) Carl Fogarty	(United Kingdom) Carl Fogarty	Ducati Performance	Report
12	R2	Germany	Hockenheimring	12 September	(New Zealand) Aaron Slight	(Japan) Akira Yanagawa	(Italy) Pierfrancesco Chili	Alstare Suzuki	Report
13	R1	Japan	Sugo	10 October	(Australia) Troy Corser	(Japan) Akira Ryō	(Japan) Akira Ryō	Suzuki	Report
13	R2	Japan	Sugo	10 October	(Australia) Troy Corser	(Japan) Akira Ryō	(Japan) Akira Yanagawa	Kawasaki Racing Team	Report

== Entry list ==
Team	Constructor	Motorcycle	No.	Rider	Rounds
Aprilia Race De Cecco	Aprilia	Aprilia RSV 1000	9	(Australia) Peter Goddard	All
Aprilia Racing	Aprilia	Aprilia RSV 1000	44	(Italy) Alessandro Antonello	5
Capill France Racing	Ducati	Ducati 916	18	(Colombia) Carlos Macias	1–7, 9–12
Hellinmoto Shell Advance	Ducati	Ducati 916	57	(Greece) Stavros Stavroulakis	5, 7
JM SBK Team	Ducati	Ducati 916	23	(Czech Republic) Jiří Mrkývka	1–5, 9–13
Team Garella Racing	Ducati	Ducati 916	58	(Italy) Giorgio Cantalupo	7
Team Motor Time	Ducati	Ducati 916	59	(Italy) Paolo Malvini	5
Team Pacific	Ducati	Ducati 916	49	(Italy) Paolo Blora	5
Team Pedercini	Ducati	Ducati 916	19	(Italy) Lucio Pedercini	1–12
Techna Racing	Ducati	Ducati 916	54	(Italy) Marco Gerbaudo	7
Tuden Racing	Ducati	Ducati 916	60	(Croatia) Hrvoje Tuden	7
Ducati Dealer Team	Ducati	Ducati 996	62	(Australia) Craig Connell	2
Ducati Dealer Team	Ducati	Ducati 996	99	(Australia) Steve Martin	2
Ducati Deutschland Remus	Ducati	Ducati 996	16	(Austria) Andy Meklau	1–2, 4–6, 9–13
Ducati Deutschland Remus	Ducati	Ducati 996	80	(Germany) Werner Dimperl	12
Ducati France FP Racing	Ducati	Ducati 996	27	(France) Frédéric Protat	3, 5–6, 8–12
Ducati France FP Racing	Ducati	Ducati 996	71	(France) Thierry Mulot	10–12
Ducati Performance	Ducati	Ducati 996	1	(United Kingdom) Carl Fogarty	All
Ducati Performance	Ducati	Ducati 996	11	(Australia) Troy Corser	All
First-Attack Racing Stein Dinse	Ducati	Ducati 996	61	(Netherlands) Wolfgang Bax	11
Motorrad Center	Ducati	Ducati 996	74	(Austria) Ali Guettouche	10
R&D Bieffe Racing Team	Ducati	Ducati 996	20	(Italy) Doriano Romboni	1–5
R&D Bieffe Racing Team	Ducati	Ducati 996	31	(Italy) Michele Malatesta	11–12
R&D Bieffe Racing Team	Ducati	Ducati 996	56	(Italy) Paolo Blora	7
R&D Bieffe Racing Team	Ducati	Ducati 996	64	(Italy) Gianluca Villa	9
Reve Red Bull Ducati	Ducati	Ducati 996	46	(United Kingdom) John Reynolds	3, 9
Reve Red Bull Ducati	Ducati	Ducati 996	48	(United Kingdom) Sean Emmett	3, 9
Team Ducati NCR	Ducati	Ducati 996	38	(South Africa) Lance Isaacs	All
Team Ducati NCR	Ducati	Ducati 996	40	(Italy) Giuliano Sartoni	1–3, 5–6, 9–12
Vance & Hines Ducati	Ducati	Ducati 996	90	(United States) Ben Bostrom	8
Vance & Hines Ducati	Ducati	Ducati 996	95	(Australia) Anthony Gobert	8
American Honda	Honda	Honda RC45	91	(United States) Eric Bostrom	8
Castrol Honda	Honda	Honda RC45	5	(United States) Colin Edwards	All
Castrol Honda	Honda	Honda RC45	111	(New Zealand) Aaron Slight	All
Team Kohtake RSC	Honda	Honda RC45	57	(Japan) Makoto Tamada	13
Team Lucky Strike Honda	Honda	Honda RC45	65	(Japan) Shinichi Ito	13
Team Lucky Strike Honda	Honda	Honda RC45	77	(Japan) Yuichi Takeda	13
Webster Racing Team	Honda	Honda RC45	76	(Australia) Scott Webster	2
White Endurance Team	Honda	Honda RC45	26	(France) Jean Pierre Jeandat	1–7, 9
White Endurance Team	Honda	Honda RC45	29	(Switzerland) Roger Kellenberger	10–12
White Endurance Team	Honda	Honda RC45	89	(United States) Mike Smith	8
Grisoni Honda	Honda	Honda VTR1000F	58	(Switzerland) Christian Monsch	5
Team CMA	Honda	Honda VTR1000F	65	(Australia) Peter Archer	2
BFT Bike Shop	Kawasaki	Kawasaki ZX-7RR	58	(Germany) Heinz Platacis	11
Greven's MC-Delar	Kawasaki	Kawasaki ZX-7RR	56	(Sweden) Jan Greven	11
Kawasaki Bertocchi Gerin	Kawasaki	Kawasaki ZX-7RR	15	(Slovenia) Igor Jerman	1–12
Kawasaki Bertocchi Gerin	Kawasaki	Kawasaki ZX-7RR	33	(Austria) Robert Ulm	All
Kawasaki Bertocchi Gerin	Kawasaki	Kawasaki ZX-7RR	70	(Italy) Giovanni Bussei	13
Kawasaki Racing Team	Kawasaki	Kawasaki ZX-7RR	4	(Japan) Akira Yanagawa	All
Kawasaki Racing Team	Kawasaki	Kawasaki ZX-7RR	6	(Spain) Gregorio Lavilla	All
Kawasaki Racing Team	Kawasaki	Kawasaki ZX-7RR	58	(Japan) Tamaki Serizawa	13
Kawasaki Racing Team	Kawasaki	Kawasaki ZX-7RR	60	(Japan) Shinya Takeishi	13
Kawasaki Racing Team	Kawasaki	Kawasaki ZX-7RR	61	(Japan) Hitoyasu Izutsu	13
Maxwell Motorcycles	Kawasaki	Kawasaki ZX-7RR	63	(Australia) Alistair Maxwell	2
Orchard Racing Team	Kawasaki	Kawasaki ZX-7RR	89	(Australia) John Orchard	2
Remus Racing Austria	Kawasaki	Kawasaki ZX-7RR	47	(Austria) Johann Wolfsteiner	10
SRT	Kawasaki	Kawasaki ZX-7RR	96	(Australia) Greg Smith	2
Team Green Kawasaki Deutschland	Kawasaki	Kawasaki ZX-7RR	63	(Germany) Jochen Schmid	6, 11–12
Team Green Kawasaki Deutschland	Kawasaki	Kawasaki ZX-7RR	66	(South Africa) Jonnie Ekerold	6, 11
Team Kawasaki	Kawasaki	Kawasaki ZX-7RR	43	(United Kingdom) Chris Walker	3, 9, 11
Team Kawasaki	Kawasaki	Kawasaki ZX-7RR	45	(United Kingdom) Steve Hislop	3
Team Kraus	Kawasaki	Kawasaki ZX-7RR	73	(Germany) Lothar Kraus	6, 12
Timm Kawasaki Hollenstedt	Kawasaki	Kawasaki ZX-7RR	49	(Germany) Hans-Jürgen Brikey	11
Alpha-Technik Team Suzuki	Suzuki	Suzuki GSX-R750	54/70	(Italy) Giovanni Bussei	5–6, 10, 12
Alstare Corona Suzuki	Suzuki	Suzuki GSX-R750	7	(Italy) Pierfrancesco Chili	All
Alstare Corona Suzuki	Suzuki	Suzuki GSX-R750	21	(Japan) Katsuaki Fujiwara	All
Clarion Suzuki	Suzuki	Suzuki GSX-R750	42	(United Kingdom) James Haydon	3, 9
Clarion Suzuki	Suzuki	Suzuki GSX-R750	50	(Australia) Martin Craggill	3, 9
Karban Racing Team Slovakia	Suzuki	Suzuki GSX-R750	24	(Slovakia) Vladimír Karban	1, 3–13
Motorradhaus Prinz Hüttlingen	Suzuki	Suzuki GSX-R750	60	(Germany) Normann Manz	12
MSC-Rottenegg	Suzuki	Suzuki GSX-R750	67	(Austria) Anton Rechberger	10
Suzuki Marushin Power Team	Suzuki	Suzuki GSX-R750	64	(Australia) Kirk McCarthy	5–6
Team Ansett Air Freight Suzuki	Suzuki	Suzuki GSX-R750	79	(Australia) Shawn Giles	2
Team Suzuki	Suzuki	Suzuki GSX-R750	59	(Japan) Keiichi Kitagawa	13
Team Suzuki	Suzuki	Suzuki GSX-R750	64	(Japan) Akira Ryo	13
Team Suzuki	Suzuki	Suzuki GSX-R750	81	(Japan) Chojun Kameya	13
Yacco Schäfer Motorsport	Suzuki	Suzuki GSX-R750	65	(Germany) Michael Schulten	6, 11
Bulbfust Bleeker Racing Team	Yamaha	Yamaha YZF750	57	(Netherlands) Ruud Van Stralen	11
Team Pirelli	Yamaha	Yamaha YZF750	53	(Italy) Redamo Assirelli	5, 7
Alpha-Technik Team Yamaha	Yamaha	Yamaha YZF-R7	71	(United Kingdom) Brian Morrison	6, 10
Alpha-Technik Team Yamaha	Yamaha	Yamaha YZF-R7	75	(Germany) Jürgen Oelschläger	12
Frontiers Motorcycles/Superbike Magazine	Yamaha	Yamaha YZF-R7	54	(United Kingdom) Dan Harris	9
Gattolone Racing Team	Yamaha	Yamaha YZF-R7	55	(Italy) Mauro Lucchiari	2–3, 5–12
Team Valli Moto	Yamaha	Yamaha YZF-R7	39	(Italy) Alessandro Gramigni	1, 3–12
Team Virgin Yamaha	Yamaha	Yamaha YZF-R7	51	(United Kingdom) Niall Mackenzie	3, 9
Yamaha Deutschland	Yamaha	Yamaha YZF-R7	72	(Sweden) Christer Lindholm	6
Yamaha Motor Corporation	Yamaha	Yamaha YZF-R7	92	(United States) Jamie Hacking	8
Yamaha Racing Team	Yamaha	Yamaha YZF-R7	56	(Japan) Wataru Yoshikawa	13
Yamaha World Superbike Team	Yamaha	Yamaha YZF-R7	22	(Italy) Vittoriano Guareschi	1–12
Yamaha World Superbike Team	Yamaha	Yamaha YZF-R7	41	(Japan) Noriyuki Haga	All

Key
Regular rider
Wildcard rider
Replacement rider

== Championship standings ==
=== Riders' standings ===
1999 final riders' standings
Pos.	Rider	Bike	RSA (South Africa)		AUS (Australia)		GBR (United Kingdom)		SPA (Spain)		ITA (Italy)		GER (Germany)		SMR (San Marino)		USA (United States)		EUR (Europe)		AUT (Austria)		NED (Netherlands)		GER (Germany)		JPN (Japan)		Pts
Pos.	Rider	Bike	R1	R2	R1	R2	R1	R2	R1	R2	R1	R2	R1	R2	R1	R2	R1	R2	R1	R2	R1	R2	R1	R2	R1	R2	R1	R2	Pts
1	(United Kingdom) Carl Fogarty	Ducati	1	1	2	2	1	2	**3**	**3**	1	1	**1**	**15**	**1**	**1**	5	4	**19**	**4**	2	4	1	1	1	2	2	5	489
2	(United States) Colin Edwards	Honda	5	4	3	3	3	1	Ret	1	**2**	**2**	Ret	4	6	7	4	5	1	1	**1**	**8**	5	5	4	5	9	9	361
3	(Australia) Troy Corser	Ducati	**2**	**3**	**1**	**1**	6	3	7	6	4	4	3	1	2	2	**6**	**2**	5	13	Ret	2	**2**	**2**	Ret	7	**8**	**14**	361
4	(New Zealand) Aaron Slight	Honda	3	2	4	4	2	Ret	4	7	5	Ret	2	2	5	4	9	6	2	2	Ret	3	3	3	**2**	**3**	16	13	323
5	(Japan) Akira Yanagawa	Kawasaki	6	5	5	6	5	4	2	2	7	5	Ret	3	3	3	3	12	6	5	DNS	DNS	6	4	3	4	3	1	308
6	(Italy) Pierfrancesco Chili	Suzuki	7	8	Ret	13	**Ret**	**5**	5	5	3	3	Ret	5	4	6	7	3	3	Ret	Ret	1	4	6	Ret	1	7	7	251
7	(Japan) Noriyuki Haga	Yamaha	4	Ret	6	5	10	6	1	Ret	6	6	Ret	6	8	Ret	Ret	10	7	3	Ret	Ret	7	8	5	9	12	4	196
8	(Spain) Gregorio Lavilla	Kawasaki	8	6	Ret	Ret	Ret	Ret	6	4	8	7	4	Ret	7	5	12	8	Ret	10	5	Ret	9	7	6	8	14	16	156
9	(Japan) Katsuaki Fujiwara	Suzuki	11	10	9	10	13	11	8	8	Ret	9	6	7	14	9	11	11	14	15	Ret	Ret	12	12	7	10	19	18	119
10	(Italy) Vittoriano Guareschi	Yamaha	12	13	13	15	16	Ret	9	9	11	10	7	9	9	8	Ret	Ret	15	14	3	Ret	13	Ret	10	12			99
11	(Austria) Andy Meklau	Ducati	13	Ret	10	11			12	11	10	8	8	10					11	12	Ret	7	8	9	Ret	6	21	Ret	94
12	(Australia) Peter Goddard	Aprilia	Ret	7	Ret	Ret	Ret	Ret	10	10	9	11	5	8	10	Ret	Ret	9	12	9	Ret	Ret	17	Ret	8	DNS	Ret	19	84
13	(Austria) Robert Ulm	Kawasaki	10	11	14	16	Ret	12	13	13	14	Ret	Ret	11	Ret	10	Ret	Ret	18	18	4	11	14	Ret	13	Ret	22	Ret	59
14	(Slovenia) Igor Jerman	Kawasaki	16	15	12	Ret	14	Ret	11	12	12	Ret	Ret	12	15	12	13	16	13	16	Ret	12	11	11	9	DNS			56
15	(Japan) Akira Ryō	Suzuki																									1	2	45
16	(United States) Ben Bostrom	Ducati															2	1											45
17	(Italy) Doriano Romboni	Ducati	9	9	7	8	11	8	DNS	DNS	Ret	DNS																	44
18	(United Kingdom) John Reynolds	Ducati					7	7											4	8									39
19	(Italy) Alessandro Gramigni	Yamaha	15	17			17	14	14	14	Ret	12	12	17	Ret	13	15	15	17	Ret	8	Ret	15	14	12	14			37
20	(Italy) Lucio Pedercini	Ducati	Ret	12	Ret	14	Ret	Ret	15	15	13	Ret	11	13	11	14	Ret	Ret	Ret	Ret	10	Ret	18	15	14	Ret			35
21	(United Kingdom) Chris Walker	Kawasaki					4	Ret											10	Ret			10	10					31
22	(Japan) Keiichi Kitagawa	Suzuki																									4	3	29
23	(United Kingdom) Niall Mackenzie	Yamaha					12	10											8	7									27
24	(Australia) Anthony Gobert	Ducati															1	Ret											25
25	(Italy) Mauro Lucchiari	Yamaha			17	Ret	Ret	17			16	15	17	18	13	11	16	Ret	16	17	7	9	Ret	Ret	18	18			25
26	(Japan) Wataru Yoshikawa	Yamaha																									5	6	21
27	(Japan) Tamaki Serizawa	Kawasaki																									6	8	18
28	(United Kingdom) Sean Emmett	Ducati					9	Ret											Ret	6									17
29	(United Kingdom) Brian Morrison	Yamaha											19	Ret							6	10							16
30	(France) Frédéric Protat	Ducati					15	15			Ret	Ret	15	19			Ret	14	Ret	19	9	13	Ret	DNS	15	16			16
31	(South Africa) Lance Isaacs	Ducati	14	14	18	19	NC	16	Ret	DNS	15	14	16	21	12	15	14	Ret	24	Ret	Ret	15	Ret	18	Ret	15	23	21	16
32	(United States) Eric Bostrom	Honda															10	7											15
33	(United Kingdom) Steve Hislop	Kawasaki					8	9																					15
34	(Australia) Craig Connell	Ducati			8	9																							15
35	(Italy) Giovanni Bussei	Suzuki									Ret	Ret	13	22							Ret	6			DNS	DNS			13
35	(Italy) Giovanni Bussei	Kawasaki																									20	20	13
36	(Italy) Michele Malatesta	Ducati																					16	13	11	11			13
37	(United Kingdom) James Haydon	Suzuki					Ret	Ret											9	11									12
38	(Japan) Makoto Tamada	Honda																									10	10	12
39	(Switzerland) Roger Kellenberger	Yamaha																			Ret	5	21	Ret	DNS	DNS			11
40	(United States) Jamie Hacking	Yamaha															8	13											11
41	(Australia) Steve Martin	Ducati			Ret	7																							9
42	(Sweden) Christer Lindholm	Yamaha											9	14															9
43	(Germany) Jochen Schmid	Kawasaki											10	16									19	16	16	13			9
44	(Australia) Shawn Giles	Suzuki			11	12																							9
45	(Japan) Takeshi Tsujimura	Yamaha																									13	12	7
46	(Czech Republic) Jiří Mrkývka	Ducati	18	Ret	15	17			Ret	17	21	Ret							22	Ret	11	Ret	Ret	Ret	20	19	Ret	Ret	6
47	(Japan) Shinya Takeishi	Kawasaki																									Ret	11	5
48	(Japan) Shinichi Ito	Honda																									11	Ret	5
49	(Austria) Anton Rechberger	Suzuki																			12	16							4
50	(Colombia) Carlos Macias	Ducati	Ret	Ret	DNQ	DNQ	Ret	Ret	17	19	DNQ	DNQ	Ret	24	Ret	Ret			Ret	Ret	13	17	25	Ret	22	Ret			3
51	(Italy) Alessandro Antonello	Aprilia									Ret	13																	3
52	(Australia) Martin Craggill	Suzuki					Ret	13											Ret	Ret									3
53	(Slovakia) Vladimír Karban	Suzuki	19	Ret			Ret	Ret	18	18	DNS	DNS	20	23	WD	WD	Ret	Ret	23	22	Ret	14	24	22	Ret	20	Ret	Ret	2
54	(South Africa) Jonnie Ekerold	Kawasaki											14	Ret									Ret	DNS					2
55	(Japan) Hitoyasu Izutsu	Kawasaki																									17	15	1
56	(Japan) Yuichi Takeda	Honda																									15	17	1
	(Italy) Redamo Assirelli	Yamaha									18	16			Ret	Ret													0
	(Australia) Alistair Maxwell	Kawasaki			16	Ret																							0
	(Greece) Stavros Stavroulakis	Ducati									Ret	17			Ret	Ret													0
	(Italy) Paolo Blora	Ducati									17	Ret			Ret	DNS													0
	(Croatia) Hrvoje Tuden	Ducati													18	18													0
	(Italy) Marco Gerbaudo	Ducati													19	19													0
	(Australia) Kirk McCarthy	Suzuki									19	Ret	Ret	20															0
	(Australia) Peter Archer	Honda			19	20																							0
	(Australia) Scott Webster	Honda			Ret	20																							0
	(Italy) Giorgio Cantalupo	Ducati													Ret	Ret													0
	(Switzerland) Christian Monsch	Honda									Ret	DNS																	0
	(Italy) Paolo Malvini	Ducati									DNS	DNS																	
	(Australia) Greg Smith	Kawasaki			DNQ	DNQ																							
	(Australia) John Orchard	Kawasaki			DNQ	DNQ																							
Pos.	Rider	Bike	RSA (South Africa)		AUS (Australia)		GBR (United Kingdom)		SPA (Spain)		ITA (Italy)		GER (Germany)		RSM (San Marino)		USA (United States)		EUR (Europe)		AUT (Austria)		NED (Netherlands)		GER (Germany)		JAP (Japan)		Pts

Colour	Result
Gold	Winner
Silver	Second place
Bronze	Third place
Green	Points classification
Blue	Non-points classification
Blue	Non-classified finish (NC)
Purple	Retired, not classified (Ret)
Red	Did not qualify (DNQ)
Red	Did not pre-qualify (DNPQ)
Black	Disqualified (DSQ)
White	Did not start (DNS)
White	Withdrew (WD)
White	Race cancelled (C)
Blank	Did not practice (DNP)
Blank	Did not arrive (DNA)
Blank	Excluded (EX)

**Bold** – Pole position
Italics – Fastest lap

=== Manufacturers' standings ===
1999 final manufacturers' standings
Pos.	Manufacturer	RSA (South Africa)		AUS (Australia)		GBR (United Kingdom)		SPA (Spain)		ITA (Italy)		GER (Germany)		RSM (San Marino)		USA (United States)		EUR (Europe)		AUT (Austria)		NED (Netherlands)		GER (Germany)		JAP (Japan)		Pts
Pos.	Manufacturer	R1	R2	R1	R2	R1	R2	R1	R2	R1	R2	R1	R2	R1	R2	R1	R2	R1	R2	R1	R2	R1	R2	R1	R2	R1	R2	Pts
1	(Italy) Ducati	1	1	1	1	1	2	3	3	1	1	1	1	1	1	1	1	4	4	2	2	1	1	1	2	2	5	569
2	(Japan) Honda	3	2	3	3	2	1	4	1	2	2	2	2	5	4	4	5	1	1	1	3	3	3	2	3	9	9	452
3	(Japan) Kawasaki	6	5	5	6	4	4	2	2	7	5	4	3	3	3	3	8	6	5	4	11	6	4	3	4	3	1	345
4	(Japan) Suzuki	7	8	9	10	13	5	5	5	3	3	6	5	4	6	7	3	3	11	12	1	4	6	7	1	1	2	319
5	(Japan) Yamaha	4	13	6	5	10	6	1	9	6	6	7	6	8	8	8	10	7	3	3	9	7	8	5	9	5	4	261
6	(Italy) Aprilia	Ret	7	Ret	Ret	Ret	Ret	10	10	9	11	5	8	10	Ret	Ret	9	12	9	Ret	Ret	17	Ret	8	DNS	Ret	19	84
Pos.	Manufacturer	RSA (South Africa)		AUS (Australia)		GBR (United Kingdom)		SPA (Spain)		ITA (Italy)		GER (Germany)		RSM (San Marino)		USA (United States)		EUR (Europe)		AUT (Austria)		NED (Netherlands)		GER (Germany)		JAP (Japan)		Pts
