= Akira Ryō =

Japanese motorcycle racer

- Nationality: Japanese
- Born: 20 October 1967 (age 59)
Motorcycle racing career statistics
MotoGP World Championship
Active years	2000–2003
Manufacturers	Suzuki
Championships	0
2003 championship position	24th (6 pts)
Starts / Wins / Podiums / Poles / F. laps / Points; 10 / 0 / 1 / 0 / 0 / 53
Superbike World Championship
Active years	1995–2001
Manufacturers	Kawasaki, Suzuki
Championships	0
2001 championship position	26th (20 pts)
Starts / Wins / Podiums / Poles / F. laps / Points; 14 / 1 / 4 / 0 / 4 / 152

Akira Ryō (梁 明, Ryō Akira) (born October 20, 1967) is a Japanese former professional motorcycle road racer and development rider.

He was All Japan Superbike Champion in 2001 and was also runner-up in 1996 and third in 1999. He finished third in the Suzuka 8 Hours race in 1997, teamed with Shinja Takeishi. He and Keiichi Kitagawa came second there in 2000.

Racing fans outside Japan know Ryō for his regular wild card entries in international championships, primarily in the Japanese rounds. In the Superbike World Championship he entered between 1995 and 2001, taking a win in the Japanese round in 1999, as well as three further podiums. He was the main development rider for Suzuki's GSV-R MotoGP bike, and raced in several times in 2002 and 2003. He nearly caused a major upset at the 2002 Japanese Grand Prix by leading for much of the race, before finishing second to Valentino Rossi.

== Career statistics ==
=== Superbike World Championship ===
==== Races by year ====
(key) (Races in bold indicate pole position) (Races in italics indicate fastest lap)

Year	Bike	1		2		3		4		5		6		7		8		9		10		11		12		13		Pos	Pts
Year	Bike	R1	R2	R1	R2	R1	R2	R1	R2	R1	R2	R1	R2	R1	R2	R1	R2	R1	R2	R1	R2	R1	R2	R1	R2	R1	R2	Pos	Pts
1995	Kawasaki	GER	GER	SMR	SMR	GBR	GBR	ITA	ITA	SPA	SPA	AUT	AUT	USA	USA	EUR	EUR	JPN; 11	JPN; 17	NED	NED	INA	INA	AUS	AUS			43rd	5
1996	Kawasaki	SMR	SMR	GBR	GBR	GER	GER	ITA	ITA	CZE	CZE	USA	USA	EUR	EUR	INA	INA	JPN; 9	JPN; 6	NED	NED	SPA	SPA	AUS	AUS			25th	17
1997	Kawasaki	AUS	AUS	SMR	SMR	GBR	GBR	GER	GER	ITA	ITA	USA	USA	EUR	EUR	AUT	AUT	NED	NED	SPA	SPA	JPN; 17	JPN; 8	INA	INA			38th	9
1998	Suzuki	AUS	AUS	GBR	GBR	ITA	ITA	SPA	SPA	GER	GER	SMR	SMR	RSA	RSA	USA	USA	EUR	EUR	AUT	AUT	NED	NED	JPN; 2	JPN; 3			17th	36
1999	Suzuki	RSA	RSA	AUS	AUS	GBR	GBR	SPA	SPA	ITA	ITA	GER	GER	SMR	SMR	USA	USA	EUR	EUR	AUT	AUT	NED	NED	GER	GER	JPN; 1	JPN; 2	15th	45
2000	Suzuki	RSA	RSA	AUS	AUS	JPN; 4	JPN; 9	GBR	GBR	ITA	ITA	GER	GER	SMR	SMR	SPA	SPA	USA	USA	EUR	EUR	NED	NED	GER	GER	GBR	GBR	29th	20
2001	Suzuki	SPA	SPA	RSA	RSA	AUS	AUS	JPN; 5	JPN; 7	ITA	ITA	GBR	GBR	GER	GER	SMR	SMR	USA	USA	EUR	EUR	GER	GER	NED	NED	ITA	ITA	26th	20

=== Grand Prix motorcycle racing ===
==== Races by year ====
(key) (Races in bold indicate pole position, races in italics indicate fastest lap)

Year	Class	Bike	1	2	3	4	5	6	7	8	9	10	11	12	13	14	15	16	Pos	Pts
2000	500cc	Suzuki	RSA	MAL	JPN; 10	SPA	FRA	ITA	CAT	NED	GBR	GER	CZE	POR	VAL	BRA	PAC	AUS	21st	6
2001	500cc	Suzuki	JPN; Ret	RSA	SPA	FRA	ITA	CAT	NED	GBR	GER	CZE	POR	VAL	PAC	AUS	MAL	BRA	NC	0
2002	MotoGP	Suzuki	JPN; 2	RSA	SPA	FRA	ITA	CAT; 11	NED; 15	GBR; 13	GER; 11	CZE	POR	BRA	PAC	MAL; 11	AUS	VAL	18th	41
2003	MotoGP	Suzuki	JPN	RSA	SPA	FRA	ITA	CAT	NED	GBR	GER	CZE	POR	BRA	PAC; 10	MAL; 20	AUS	VAL	24th	6
