= 2000 Superbike World Championship =

2000 Superbike World Championship
Previous:	1999	Next:	2001
Support series: Supersport World Championship; Superstock European Championship

The 2000 Superbike World Championship was the thirteenth FIM Superbike World Championship season. The season started on 2 April at Kyalami and finished on 15 October at Brands Hatch after 13 rounds.

Colin Edwards won the riders' championship on a Honda RC51 (also known as VTR1000) in its first production year with 8 victories and Ducati won the manufacturers' championship.

== Race calendar and results ==
2000 Superbike World Championship Calendar
Round		Circuit	Date	Superpole	Fastest lap	Winning rider	Winning team
1	R1	(South Africa) Kyalami	2 April	(Australia) Troy Corser	(United States) Colin Edwards	(United States) Colin Edwards	Castrol Honda
1	R2	(South Africa) Kyalami	2 April	(Australia) Troy Corser	(United Kingdom) Carl Fogarty	(Japan) Noriyuki Haga	Yamaha WSBK
2	R1	(Australia) Phillip Island	23 April	(Australia) Troy Corser	(United Kingdom) Carl Fogarty	(Australia) Anthony Gobert	MVR Bimota Exp.
2	R2	(Australia) Phillip Island	23 April	(Australia) Troy Corser	(Australia) Troy Corser	(Australia) Troy Corser	Aprilia Racing
3	R1	(Japan) Sugo	30 April	(United States) Colin Edwards	(Japan) Akira Ryō	(Japan) Hitoyasu Izutsu	Kawasaki Racing
3	R2	(Japan) Sugo	30 April	(United States) Colin Edwards	(Japan) Hitoyasu Izutsu	(Japan) Hitoyasu Izutsu	Kawasaki Racing
4	R1	(United Kingdom) Donington Park	14 May	(United States) Colin Edwards	(Italy) Pierfrancesco Chili	(United States) Colin Edwards	Castrol Honda
4	R2	(United Kingdom) Donington Park	14 May	(United States) Colin Edwards	(United States) Colin Edwards	(United Kingdom) Neil Hodgson	INS GSE Racing
5	R1	(Italy) Monza	21 May	(United States) Colin Edwards	(Italy) Pierfrancesco Chili	(Italy) Pierfrancesco Chili	Alstare Suzuki
5	R2	(Italy) Monza	21 May	(United States) Colin Edwards	(Italy) Pierfrancesco Chili	(United States) Colin Edwards	Castrol Honda
6	R1	(Germany) Hockenheimring	4 June	(United States) Colin Edwards	(Italy) Pierfrancesco Chili	(Australia) Troy Bayliss	Ducati Infostrada
6	R2	(Germany) Hockenheimring	4 June	(United States) Colin Edwards	(Japan) Noriyuki Haga	(Japan) Noriyuki Haga	Yamaha WSBK
7	R1	(San Marino) Misano	18 June	(Australia) Troy Corser	(Australia) Troy Corser	(Australia) Troy Corser	Aprilia Racing
7	R2	(San Marino) Misano	18 June	(Australia) Troy Corser	(Australia) Troy Corser	(Australia) Troy Corser	Aprilia Racing
8	R1	(Spain) Valencia	25 June	(Australia) Troy Corser	(Australia) Troy Corser	(Australia) Troy Corser	Aprilia Racing
8	R2	(Spain) Valencia	25 June	(Australia) Troy Corser	(Japan) Noriyuki Haga	(Japan) Noriyuki Haga	Yamaha WSBK
9	R1	(United States) Laguna Seca	9 July	(Australia) Troy Bayliss	(Japan) Noriyuki Haga	(Japan) Noriyuki Haga	Yamaha WSBK
9	R2	(United States) Laguna Seca	9 July	(Australia) Troy Bayliss	(United States) Ben Bostrom	(Australia) Troy Corser	Aprilia Racing
10	R1	(Europe) Brands Hatch	6 August	(United Kingdom) Neil Hodgson	(United Kingdom) Neil Hodgson	(Australia) Troy Bayliss	Ducati Infostrada
10	R2	(Europe) Brands Hatch	6 August	(United Kingdom) Neil Hodgson	(United Kingdom) Neil Hodgson	(United Kingdom) Neil Hodgson	INS GSE Racing
11	R1	(Netherlands) Assen	3 September	(United States) Colin Edwards	(United States) Colin Edwards	(United States) Colin Edwards	Castrol Honda
11	R2	(Netherlands) Assen	3 September	(United States) Colin Edwards	(Spain) Juan Borja	(Japan) Noriyuki Haga	Yamaha WSBK
12	R1	(Germany) Oschersleben	10 September	(United States) Colin Edwards	(United States) Colin Edwards	(United States) Colin Edwards	Castrol Honda
12	R2	(Germany) Oschersleben	10 September	(United States) Colin Edwards	(Australia) Troy Bayliss	(United States) Colin Edwards	Castrol Honda
13	R1	(United Kingdom) Brands Hatch	15 October	(United Kingdom) Neil Hodgson	(United States) Colin Edwards	(United Kingdom) John Reynolds	Reve Red Bull
13	R2	(United Kingdom) Brands Hatch	15 October	(United Kingdom) Neil Hodgson	(United States) Colin Edwards	(United States) Colin Edwards	Castrol Honda

== Championship standings ==
=== Riders' standings ===
2000 final riders' standings
Pos.	Rider	Bike	RSA (South Africa)		AUS (Australia)		JPN (Japan)		GBR (United Kingdom)		ITA (Italy)		GER (Germany)		SMR (San Marino)		ESP (Spain)		USA (United States)		GBR (United Kingdom)		NED (Netherlands)		GER (Germany)		GBR (United Kingdom)		Pts
Pos.	Rider	Bike	R1	R2	R1	R2	R1	R2	R1	R2	R1	R2	R1	R2	R1	R2	R1	R2	R1	R2	R1	R2	R1	R2	R1	R2	R1	R2	Pts
1	(United States) Colin Edwards	Honda	1	1	5	5	**5**	**3**	**1**	**Ret**	**2**	**1**	**4**	**2**	Ret	10	5	4	2	4	10	6	**1**	**5**	**1**	**1**	8	1	400
2	(Japan) Noriyuki Haga	Yamaha	2	DSQ	10	2	2	4	4	4	Ret	5	3	1	7	Ret	3	1	1	2	5	4	3	1	9	5			335
3	(Australia) Troy Corser	Aprilia	**4**	**3**	**Ret**	**1**	9	5	8	Ret	8	6	7	6	**1**	**1**	**1**	**5**	3	1	6	Ret	4	7	7	Ret	7	3	310
4	(Italy) Pierfrancesco Chili	Suzuki	5	2	Ret	3	3	Ret	2	3	1	2	Ret	3	Ret	Ret	Ret	9	5	6	8	3	Ret	Ret	6	6	10	2	258
5	(Japan) Akira Yanagawa	Kawasaki	DNS	DNS	9	6	Ret	6	7	5	3	3	2	Ret	5	6	10	12	6	5	9	5	6	2	4	3	6	7	247
6	(Australia) Troy Bayliss	Ducati					Ret	Ret			4	4	1	4	2	2	4	3	**Ret**	**7**	1	2	Ret	Ret	3	2	2	Ret	243
7	(United States) Ben Bostrom	Ducati	9	7	15	14	Ret	13	15	8	7	10	10	11	6	3	2	2	4	3	15	17	16	Ret	10	7	24	10	174
8	(New Zealand) Aaron Slight	Honda							9	7	5	7	5	5	Ret	9	7	7	8	9	7	Ret	5	4	5	Ret	13	8	153
9	(Japan) Katsuaki Fujiwara	Suzuki	8	8	13	7	Ret	Ret	Ret	13	11	9	18	10	3	4	8	10	7	8	17	10	10	8	14	8	11	9	151
10	(Spain) Gregorio Lavilla	Kawasaki	6	5	7	4	10	10	11	Ret	6	Ret									12	8	Ret	Ret	2	4	9	5	133
11	(Spain) Juan Borja	Ducati	10	6	Ret	Ret	14	11	Ret	Ret	Ret	Ret	13	12	4	5	Ret	8	9	Ret	11	Ret	2	3	Ret	DNS	5	14	123
12	(United Kingdom) Neil Hodgson	Ducati							3	1											**2**	**1**					**4**	**Ret**	99
13	(Austria) Andy Meklau	Ducati	11	12	Ret	17	11	12	14	9	Ret	8	6	8	11	13	11	Ret	12	Ret	13	9	Ret	9	16	12	23	16	91
14	(United Kingdom) Chris Walker	Suzuki							5	2											3	7					3	6	82
15	(Italy) Alessandro Antonello	Aprilia	18	9					17	11	9	11	9	7	10	7	9	Ret			14	Ret	Ret	Ret	8	Ret	17	Ret	72
16	(Austria) Robert Ulm	Ducati	16	Ret	6	11	12	14	13	Ret	10	Ret	8	9	Ret	Ret	Ret	DNS	Ret	14	DNS	DNS	12	10	13	10	22	15	67
17	(United Kingdom) John Reynolds	Ducati							10	Ret			Ret	Ret							4	Ret					1	4	57
18	(Japan) Haruchika Aoki	Ducati	7	4	Ret	10	Ret	Ret	Ret	10	Ret	DNS			9	11	Ret	11	11	Ret	DNS	DNS							56
19	(Japan) Hitoyasu Izutsu	Kawasaki					1	1																					50
20	(Italy) Vittoriano Guareschi	Yamaha	15	Ret	3	Ret	Ret	Ret	NC	14	12	Ret	23	13	Ret	16	12	13	Ret	DNS	19	12	15	Ret	Ret	Ret	12	12	46
21	(Italy) Giovanni Bussei	Kawasaki	12	10	8	Ret	15	Ret	19	Ret	14	Ret	21	Ret	Ret	12	Ret	Ret	10	11	18	Ret	8	Ret	Ret	18	Ret	Ret	44
22	(Australia) Peter Goddard	Kawasaki													8	8	6	6	16	10					17	Ret			42
23	(Italy) Alessandro Gramigni	Yamaha	17	14					16	15	16	Ret	16	19	12	15	19	14			16	11	14	6	11	11	Ret	11	42
24	(Japan) Wataru Yoshikawa	Yamaha					8	2																	12	9			39
25	(Australia) Anthony Gobert	Bimota	Ret	11	1	9	Ret	Ret			22	Ret	Ret	Ret															37
25	(Australia) Anthony Gobert	Yamaha																									Ret	Ret	37
26	(United Kingdom) Carl Fogarty	Ducati	3	Ret	2	Ret																							36
27	(Italy) Lucio Pedercini	Ducati			4	13	Ret	Ret	Ret	Ret	Ret	Ret	Ret	Ret	13	14	Ret	16	13	15	Ret	18	11	13	Ret	Ret	Ret	Ret	33
28	(United Kingdom) James Haydon	Ducati							6	6			12	Ret							DNS	DNS					Ret	Ret	24
29	(Japan) Akira Ryō	Suzuki					4	9																					20
30	(New Zealand) Simon Crafar	Honda	14	13	Ret	8																							20
30	(New Zealand) Simon Crafar	Kawasaki											11	14															20
31	(Japan) Keiichi Kitagawa	Suzuki					6	8																					18
32	(Italy) Mauro Sanchini	Ducati	19	15	12	12	Ret	18	21	18	13	Ret	19	Ret	Ret	Ret	13	15	14	Ret	24	Ret	Ret	Ret	21	17	16	18	18
33	(South Africa) Lance Isaacs	Ducati	13	19	14	Ret	18	17	23	20	20	14	20	16	15	18	17	17	Ret	12	25	15	21	14	18	14	18	Ret	17
34	(Germany) Markus Barth	Yamaha							18	16	15	12	15	15	17	Ret	15	21			20	13	DNS	DNS	15	13	15	17	16
35	(Italy) Doriano Romboni	Ducati																					7	11	Ret	DNS			14
36	(Germany) Jürgen Oelschläger	Yamaha							22	Ret	18	13	Ret	17	Ret	Ret	Ret	20			Ret	Ret	9	12	Ret	19	Ret	19	14
37	(Japan) Tamaki Serizawa	Kawasaki					Ret	7																					9
38	(Japan) Makoto Tamada	Honda					7	Ret																					9
39	(United Kingdom) Steve Plater	Kawasaki											14	Ret													14	13	7
40	(Australia) Alistair Maxwell	Kawasaki			11	Ret																							5
41	(United Kingdom) John Crawford	Suzuki							Ret	12																			4
42	(United Kingdom) Steve Hislop	Yamaha							12	Ret											DNS	DNS							4
43	(Slovenia) Igor Jerman	Kawasaki																	15	16	23	Ret	13	Ret	Ret	Ret	Ret	Ret	4
44	(United States) Larry Pegram	Ducati																	17	13									3
45	(Japan) Yuichi Takeda	Honda					13	16																					3
46	(Italy) Marco Borciani	Ducati	20	16	16	16	19	19	20	19	21	Ret	17	18	DNS	DNS			Ret	Ret	22	14	Ret	Ret	19	15	21	Ret	3
47	(Italy) Paolo Blora	Ducati							Ret	DNS	19	15	22	20	Ret	17	14	19	Ret	DNS									3
48	(France) Frédéric Protat	Ducati									17	Ret			14	Ret	16	18			21	Ret							2
49	(France) Gerald Muteau	Honda																					18	15	25	22	Ret	Ret	1
50	(Japan) Manabu Kamada	Honda					16	15																					1
51	(Italy) Igor Antonelli	Kawasaki	Ret	17	Ret	15	Ret	Ret	24	Ret	Ret	16	Ret	Ret	Ret	20	20	Ret											1
Pos.	Rider	Bike	RSA (South Africa)		AUS (Australia)		JPN (Japan)		GBR (United Kingdom)		ITA (Italy)		GER (Germany)		SMR (San Marino)		ESP (Spain)		USA (United States)		GBR (United Kingdom)		NED (Netherlands)		GER (Germany)		GBR (United Kingdom)		Pts

Colour	Result
Gold	Winner
Silver	Second place
Bronze	Third place
Green	Points classification
Blue	Non-points classification
Blue	Non-classified finish (NC)
Purple	Retired, not classified (Ret)
Red	Did not qualify (DNQ)
Red	Did not pre-qualify (DNPQ)
Black	Disqualified (DSQ)
White	Did not start (DNS)
White	Withdrew (WD)
White	Race cancelled (C)
Blank	Did not practice (DNP)
Blank	Did not arrive (DNA)
Blank	Excluded (EX)

**Bold** – Pole position
Italics – Fastest lap

=== Manufacturers' standings ===
Pos.	Manufacturer	RSA (South Africa)		AUS (Australia)		JPN (Japan)		GBR (United Kingdom)		ITA (Italy)		GER (Germany)		SMR (San Marino)		ESP (Spain)		USA (United States)		GBR (United Kingdom)		NED (Netherlands)		GER (Germany)		GBR (United Kingdom)		Pts
Pos.	Manufacturer	R1	R2	R1	R2	R1	R2	R1	R2	R1	R2	R1	R2	R1	R2	R1	R2	R1	R2	R1	R2	R1	R2	R1	R2	R1	R2	Pts
1	(Italy) Ducati	3	4	2	10	11	11	3	1	4	4	1	4	2	2	2	2	4	3	1	1	2	3	3	2	1	4	439
2	(Japan) Honda	1	1	5	5	5	3	1	7	2	1	4	2	18	9	5	4	2	4	7	6	1	4	1	1	8	1	415
3	(Japan) Yamaha	2	14	3	2	2	2	4	4	12	5	3	1	7	15	3	1	1	2	5	4	3	1	9	5	12	11	368
4	(Japan) Suzuki	5	2	13	3	3	8	2	2	1	2	18	3	3	4	8	9	5	6	3	3	10	8	6	6	3	2	342
5	(Japan) Kawasaki	6	5	7	4	1	1	7	5	3	3	2	14	5	6	6	6	6	5	9	5	6	2	2	3	6	5	334
6	(Italy) Aprilia	4	3	Ret	1	9	5	8	11	8	6	7	6	1	1	1	5	3	1	6	Ret	4	7	7	Ret	7	3	315
7	(Italy) Bimota	Ret	11	1	9	Ret	Ret			22	Ret	Ret	Ret															37
Pos.	Manufacturer	RSA (South Africa)		AUS (Australia)		JPN (Japan)		GBR (United Kingdom)		ITA (Italy)		GER (Germany)		SMR (San Marino)		ESP (Spain)		USA (United States)		GBR (United Kingdom)		NED (Netherlands)		GER (Germany)		GBR (United Kingdom)		Pts

== Entry list ==
2000 entry list
Team	Constructor	Motorcycle	No.	Rider	Rounds
Ducati Infostrada	Ducati	Ducati 996	1	(United Kingdom) Carl Fogarty	1–2
Ducati Infostrada	Ducati	Ducati 996	19	(Spain) Juan Borja	6–13
Ducati Infostrada	Ducati	Ducati 996	21	(Australia) Troy Bayliss	3, 5–13
Ducati Infostrada	Ducati	Ducati 996	22	(Italy) Luca Cadalora	4
Ducati Infostrada	Ducati	Ducati 996	155	(United States) Ben Bostrom	1–5
Castrol Honda	Honda	Honda VTR1000	2	(United States) Colin Edwards	All
Castrol Honda	Honda	Honda VTR1000	5	(New Zealand) Simon Crafar	1–2
Castrol Honda	Honda	Honda VTR1000	36	(Japan) Manabu Kamada	3
Castrol Honda	Honda	Honda VTR1000	111	(New Zealand) Aaron Slight	4–13
Aprilia Racing	Aprilia	Aprilia RSV 1000	3	(Australia) Troy Corser	All
Aprilia Racing	Aprilia	Aprilia RSV 1000	30	(Italy) Alessandro Antonello	1, 4–8, 10–13
Kawasaki Racing	Kawasaki	Kawasaki ZX-7RR	4	(Japan) Akira Yanagawa	All
Kawasaki Racing	Kawasaki	Kawasaki ZX-7RR	5	(New Zealand) Simon Crafar	6
Kawasaki Racing	Kawasaki	Kawasaki ZX-7RR	6	(Spain) Gregorio Lavilla	1–5, 10–13
Kawasaki Racing	Kawasaki	Kawasaki ZX-7RR	14	(Australia) Peter Goddard	7–9
Kawasaki Racing	Kawasaki	Kawasaki ZX-7RR	14	(Australia) Peter Goddard	12
Kawasaki Racing	Kawasaki	Kawasaki ZX-7RR	62	(Japan) Tamaki Serizawa	3
Kawasaki Racing	Kawasaki	Kawasaki ZX-7RR	64	(Japan) Hitoyasu Izutsu	3
Suzuki Alstare	Suzuki	Suzuki GSX-R750	7	(Italy) Pierfrancesco Chili	All
Suzuki Alstare	Suzuki	Suzuki GSX-R750	9	(Japan) Katsuaki Fujiwara	All
Yamaha WSBK	Yamaha	Yamaha YZF-R7	10	(Italy) Vittoriano Guareschi	All
Yamaha WSBK	Yamaha	Yamaha YZF-R7	41	(Japan) Noriyuki Haga	1–12
Yamaha WSBK	Yamaha	Yamaha YZF-R7	57	(Japan) Wataru Yoshikawa	3, 12
Pedercini	Ducati	Ducati RS 996	11	(Italy) Lucio Pedercini	2–13
Pedercini	Ducati	Ducati RS 996	20	(Italy) Marco Borciani	1–7, 9–13
Pedercini	Ducati	Ducati RS 996	31	(Italy) Marco Gerbaudo	8
Pedercini	Ducati	Ducati RS 996	46	(Italy) Mauro Sanchini	All
R & D Bieffe	Ducati	Ducati RS 996	12	(Japan) Haruchika Aoki	1–5, 7–10
R & D Bieffe	Ducati	Ducati RS 996	82	(Italy) Doriano Romboni	11–12
Gerin WSBK	Ducati	Ducati 996 RS2000	13	(Austria) Andy Meklau	All
Gerin WSBK	Ducati	Ducati 996 RS2000	33	(Austria) Robert Ulm	All
Kawasaki Bertocchi	Kawasaki	Kawasaki ZX-7RR	15	(Italy) Igor Antonelli	1–8
Kawasaki Bertocchi	Kawasaki	Kawasaki ZX-7RR	32	(Italy) Massimo De Silvestro	1, 4–8, 10–13
Kawasaki Bertocchi	Kawasaki	Kawasaki ZX-7RR	35	(Italy) Giovanni Bussei	All
Kawasaki Bertocchi	Kawasaki	Kawasaki ZX-7RR	76	(Slovenia) Igor Jerman	9–13
Alpha Technik Yamaha	Yamaha	Yamaha R7	18	(Germany) Markus Barth	4–8, 10–13
Alpha Technik Yamaha	Yamaha	Yamaha R7	28	(Germany) Jürgen Oelschläger	4–8, 10–13
Ducati NCR	Ducati	Ducati RS 996	19	(Spain) Juan Borja	1–5
Ducati NCR	Ducati	Ducati RS 996	38	(South Africa) Lance Isaacs	All
Ducati NCR	Ducati	Ducati RS 996	155	(United States) Ben Bostrom	6–13
JM SBK	Ducati	Ducati 996R	23	(Czech Republic) Jiří Mrkývka	1–3, 5–8, 10–13
Karban Racing	Suzuki	Suzuki GSX-R750	24	(Slovakia) Vladimír Karban	1–2, 4–6
FP Racing	Ducati	Ducati RS 996	27	(France) Frédéric Protat	5, 7–8, 10
FP Racing	Ducati	Ducati RS 996	68	(France) Thierry Mulot	7–8
Valli Racing 391	Yamaha	Yamaha R7	39	(Italy) Alessandro Gramigni	1, 4–8, 10–13
Kawasaki UK	Kawasaki	Kawasaki ZX-7RR	40	(United Kingdom) Steve Plater	6, 13
National Tyres - Clarion Suzuki	Suzuki	Suzuki GSX-R750	42	(United Kingdom) John Crawford	4
National Tyres - Clarion Suzuki	Suzuki	Suzuki GSX-R750	49	(United Kingdom) Chris Walker	4, 10, 13
Virgin Mobile Yamaha	Yamaha	Yamaha R7	43	(United Kingdom) Steve Hislop	4, 10
Virgin Mobile Yamaha	Yamaha	Yamaha R7	501	(Australia) Anthony Gobert	13
Philippe Coulon	Honda	Honda VTR1000	44	(Switzerland) Claude-Alain Jaggi	2–6, 8, 10
Philippe Coulon	Honda	Honda VTR1000	83	(France) Gerald Muteau	11–13
Reve Red Bull	Ducati	Ducati RS 996	45	(United Kingdom) James Haydon	4, 6, 10, 13
Reve Red Bull	Ducati	Ducati RS 996	47	(United Kingdom) John Reynolds	4, 6, 10, 13
INS - GSE Racing	Ducati	Ducati RS 996	48	(United Kingdom) Neil Hodgson	4, 10, 13
SRT Shell Kawasaki	Kawasaki	Kawasaki ZX-7RR	50	(Australia) Alistair Maxwell	2
Stevens Motorcycles	Suzuki	Suzuki GSX-R750	51	(Australia) David Simpson	2
Sean McKay Racing	Kawasaki	Kawasaki ZX-7RR	53	(Australia) Sean McKay	2
Steven R. Monza Imp.	Kawasaki	Kawasaki ZX-7RR	54	(Australia) Greg Smith	2
Ferrari Dental Cl.	Ducati	Ducati RS 996	55	(Australia) Mark Ferrari	2
Webster	Honda	Honda VTR1000	56	(Australia) Scott Webster	2
Suzuki	Suzuki	Suzuki GSX-R750	58	(Japan) Akira Ryō	3
Suzuki	Suzuki	Suzuki GSX-R750	59	(Japan) Keiichi Kitagawa	3
Cabin Honda	Honda	Honda VTR1000	60	(Japan) Shinichi Ito	3
Kotake RSC	Honda	Honda RC45	61	(Japan) Makoto Tamada	3
Sakurai Honda	Honda	Honda VTR1000	63	(Japan) Yuichi Takeda	3
Pacific	Ducati	Ducati 996 RS2000	65	(Italy) Giuliano Sartoni	7–8, 12
Pacific	Ducati	Ducati 996 RS2000	91	(Italy) Daniele Morigi	10–12
Pacific	Ducati	Ducati 996 RS2000	113	(Italy) Paolo Blora	4–9
Kawasaki France	Kawasaki	Kawasaki ZX-7RR	67	(France) Ludovic Holon	7
White Endurance	Honda	Honda VTR1000	69	(South Africa) Jonnie Ekerold	1–7
White Endurance	Honda	Honda VTR1000	78	(France) Bertrand Stey	10–13
White Endurance	Honda	Honda VTR1000	80	(Spain) Oriol Fernández	8
Ghelfi Art Racing	Honda	Honda VTR1000	70	(Spain) Javier Rodríguez	8, 11–13
Procurde RPM Expert	Ducati	Ducati 996 SPS	71	(Spain) Guim Roda	8
Pirelli Moto 2000	Yamaha	Yamaha R7	72	(Italy) Redamo Assirelli	7
Comp. Acc. Ducati	Ducati	Ducati 996	73	(United States) Larry Pegram	9
Pro Honda Oils Chem.	Honda	Honda VTR1000	74	(United States) Brian Parriott	9
Duyzers	Suzuki	Suzuki GSX-R750	77	(Netherlands) Maarten Duyzers	11
Image Trading S100	Suzuki	Suzuki GSX-R750	79	(Netherlands) Robert van der Molen	11
Hans v Wijk Motoren	Suzuki	Suzuki GSX-R750	81	(Netherlands) Andre Coers	11
Yamaha Denmark	Yamaha	Yamaha R7	84	(Denmark) Rene Prang	12
Yamaha Norway	Yamaha	Yamaha R7	85	(Norway) Oddgeir Havnen	12
MVR Bimota Exp.	Bimota	Bimota SB8R	501	(Australia) Anthony Gobert	1–3, 5–6

Key
Regular rider
Wildcard rider
Replacement rider
