= 1999 Kyalami Superbike World Championship round =

1999 South Africa Superbike World Championship round
Round details
- Round 1 of 13 rounds in the 1999 Superbike World Championship. and Round 1 of 11 rounds in the 1999 Supersport World Championship.
- Date: 28 March, 1999
- Location: Kyalami
- Course: Permanent racing facility 4.267 km (2.651 mi)

Superbike World Championship
Pole position
(Australia) Troy Corser
1:42.943
Fastest lap race 1	Fastest lap race 2
(United States) Colin Edwards	(United Kingdom) Carl Fogarty
1:43.800	1:43.477

Supersport World Championship
Pole position
(Spain) Rubén Xaus
1:47.293
Fastest lap
(United Kingdom) Iain MacPherson
1:48.343

The 1999 Kyalami Superbike World Championship round was the opening round of the 1999 Superbike World Championship season and the 1999 Supersport World Championship season. It took place on the weekend of 26–28 March 1999 at the 4.26 km Kyalami Circuit in South Africa. The round was marred by the death of Brett MacLeod after a crash in the Supersport race.

== Superbike ==
=== Entry list ===
No.	Rider	Team	Motorcycle
1	(United Kingdom) Carl Fogarty	Ducati Performance	Ducati 996
4	(Japan) Akira Yanagawa	Kawasaki Racing Team	Kawasaki ZX-7RR
5	(United States) Colin Edwards	Castrol Honda	Honda RC45
6	(Spain) Gregorio Lavilla	Kawasaki Racing Team	Kawasaki ZX-7RR
7	(Italy) Pierfrancesco Chili	Suzuki Alstare F.S.	Suzuki GSX-R750
9	(Australia) Peter Goddard	Aprilia Rac.De Cecco	Aprilia RSV1000
11	(Australia) Troy Corser	Ducati Performance	Ducati 996
15	(Slovenia) Igor Jerman	Kawasaki Bertocchi	Kawasaki ZX-7RR
16	(Austria) Andreas Meklau	Remus Racing Austria	Ducati 996
18	(Colombia) Carlos Macias	Capill France Racing	Ducati 916
19	(Italy) Lucio Pedercini	Team Pedercini	Ducati 916
20	(Italy) Doriano Romboni	R & D Racing Team	Ducati 996
21	(Japan) Katsuaki Fujiwara	Suzuki Alstare F.S.	Suzuki GSX-R750
22	(Italy) Vittoriano Guareschi	Yamaha WSBK Team	Yamaha R7
23	(Czech Republic) Jiří Mrkývka	JM SBK Team	Ducati 916
24	(Slovakia) Vladimír Karban	Karban Racing Team	Suzuki GSX-R750
26	(France) Jean-Pierre Jeandat	White Endurance	Honda RC45
33	(Austria) Robert Ulm	Kawasaki Bertocchi	Kawasaki ZX-7RR
38	(South Africa) Lance Isaacs	Team Ducati NCR	Ducati 996
39	(Italy) Alessandro Gramigni	Team Valli Moto	Yamaha R7
40	(Italy) Giuliano Sartoni	Team Ducati NCR	Ducati 996
41	(Japan) Noriyuki Haga	Yamaha WSBK Team	Yamaha R7
111	(New Zealand) Aaron Slight	Castrol Honda	Honda RC45

=== Race 1 ===
==== Summary ====
Carl Fogarty got the holeshot from pole position and led Corser and Haga into the first corner. Doriano Romboni made a strong start, but dropped back due to the pain of his injured hand. Aprilia's World Superbike debut lasted less than 3 laps, after Peter Goddard dropped it at the chicane. The field became spread out by lap 5, with Fogarty 3 seconds ahead of team-mate Corser, who was battling with Slight for second. Ducati riders Lucio Pedercini and Carlos Macias both crashed out on lap 16. After 25 laps, Carl Fogarty won his 49th World Superbike race, ahead of Corser, Slight, Haga and Edwards. The Kawasakis of Yanagawa and Lavilla suffered tyre, suspension and power difficulties but managed sixth and eighth respectively, with Chili between them in seventh.

==== Classification ====
Pos.	No.	Rider	Bike	Laps	Time/Retired	Grid	Points
1	1	(United Kingdom) Carl Fogarty	Ducati 996	25	43:35.637	2	25
2	11	(Australia) Troy Corser	Ducati 996	25	+5.257	1	20
3	111	(New Zealand) Aaron Slight	Honda RC45	25	+9.779	3	16
4	41	(Japan) Noriyuki Haga	Yamaha R7	25	+13.181	4	13
5	5	(United States) Colin Edwards	Honda RC45	25	+14.535	6	11
6	4	(Japan) Akira Yanagawa	Kawasaki ZX-7RR	25	+16.547	5	10
7	7	(Italy) Pierfrancesco Chili	Suzuki GSX-R750	25	+32.957	14	9
8	6	(Spain) Gregorio Lavilla	Kawasaki ZX-7RR	25	+37.099	11	8
9	20	(Italy) Doriano Romboni	Ducati 996	25	+45.691	7	7
10	33	(Austria) Robert Ulm	Kawasaki ZX-7RR	25	+54.185	8	6
11	21	(Japan) Katsuaki Fujiwara	Suzuki GSX-R750	25	+54.424	10	5
12	22	(Italy) Vittoriano Guareschi	Yamaha R7	25	+1:09.588	15	4
13	16	(Austria) Andreas Meklau	Ducati 996	25	+1:09.938	12	3
14	38	(South Africa) Lance Isaacs	Ducati 996	25	+1:11.106	19	2
15	39	(Italy) Alessandro Gramigni	Yamaha R7	25	+1:26.836	16	1
16	15	(Slovenia) Igor Jerman	Kawasaki ZX-7RR	25	+1:30.328	17	
17	26	(France) Jean-Pierre Jeandat	Honda RC45	25	+1:44.035	18	
18	23	(Czech Republic) Jiří Mrkývka	Ducati 916	24	+1 lap	20	
19	24	(Slovakia) Vladimír Karban	Suzuki GSX-R750	24	+1 lap	21	
Ret	19	(Italy) Lucio Pedercini	Ducati 916	15	Crash	13	
Ret	18	(Colombia) Carlos Macias	Ducati 916	15	Crash	22	
Ret	40	(Italy) Giuliano Sartoni	Ducati 996	3	Technical	23	
Ret	9	(Australia) Peter Goddard	Aprilia RSV1000	2	Crash	9	

=== Race 2 ===
==== Classification ====
Pos.	No.	Rider	Bike	Laps	Time/Retired	Grid	Points
1	1	(United Kingdom) Carl Fogarty	Ducati 996	25	43:41.963	2	25
2	111	(New Zealand) Aaron Slight	Honda RC45	25	+6.073	3	20
3	11	(Australia) Troy Corser	Ducati 996	25	+7.279	1	16
4	5	(United States) Colin Edwards	Honda RC45	25	+12.401	6	13
5	4	(Japan) Akira Yanagawa	Kawasaki ZX-7RR	25	+15.632	5	11
6	6	(Spain) Gregorio Lavilla	Kawasaki ZX-7RR	25	+19.634	11	10
7	9	(Australia) Peter Goddard	Aprilia RSV1000	25	+21.521	9	9
8	7	(Italy) Pierfrancesco Chili	Suzuki GSX-R750	25	+25.508	14	8
9	20	(Italy) Doriano Romboni	Ducati 996	25	+25.660	7	7
10	21	(Japan) Katsuaki Fujiwara	Suzuki GSX-R750	25	+31.415	10	6
11	33	(Austria) Robert Ulm	Kawasaki ZX-7RR	25	+46.765	8	5
12	19	(Italy) Lucio Pedercini	Ducati 916	25	+52.192	13	4
13	22	(Italy) Vittoriano Guareschi	Yamaha R7	25	+1:03.311	15	3
14	38	(South Africa) Lance Isaacs	Ducati 996	25	+1:22.799	19	2
15	15	(Slovenia) Igor Jerman	Kawasaki ZX-7RR	25	+1:26.729	17	1
16	26	(France) Jean-Pierre Jeandat	Honda RC45	25	+1:43.480	18	
17	39	(Italy) Alessandro Gramigni	Yamaha R7	24	+1 lap	16	
Ret	16	(Austria) Andreas Meklau	Ducati 996	24	Retired	12	
Ret	24	(Slovakia) Vladimír Karban	Suzuki GSX-R750	22	Retired	21	
Ret	41	(Japan) Noriyuki Haga	Yamaha R7	14	Retired	4	
Ret	40	(Italy) Giuliano Sartoni	Ducati 996	7	Retired	23	
Ret	23	(Czech Republic) Jiří Mrkývka	Ducati 916	6	Retired	20	
Ret	18	(Colombia) Carlos Macias	Ducati 916	0	Retired	22	

== Supersport ==
=== Race ===
==== Classification ====
Pos.	No.	Rider	Bike	Laps	Time/Retired	Grid	Points
1	12	(United Kingdom) Iain MacPherson	Kawasaki	23	41:52.104	3	25
2	3	(France) Stéphane Chambon	Suzuki	23	+12.515	4	20
3	21	(Germany) Jörg Teuchert	Yamaha	23	+21.145	8	16
4	22	(Germany) Christian Kellner	Yamaha	23	+22.500	6	13
5	51	(South Africa) Russell Wood	Yamaha	23	+27.675	12	11
6	52	(United Kingdom) James Toseland	Honda	23	+29.166	17	10
7	4	(Italy) Paolo Casoli	Ducati	23	+30.043	11	9
8	8	(Netherlands) Wilco Zeelenberg	Yamaha	23	+38.618	9	8
9	32	(Spain) José David de Gea	Honda	23	+39.640	19	7
10	25	(France) William Costes	Honda	23	+41.919	7	6
11	34	(Switzerland) Yves Briguet	Suzuki	23	+44.139	22	5
12	54	(South Africa) Graeme van Breda	Honda	23	+48.728	18	4
13	26	(Italy) Roberto Teneggi	Ducati	23	+51.091	15	3
14	7	(Italy) Piergiorgio Bontempi	Yamaha	23	+1:04.227	27	2
15	17	(Spain) Pere Riba	Honda	23	+1:06.117	10	1
16	18	(Italy) Camillo Mariottini	Kawasaki	23	+1:07.325	25	
17	42	(Spain) David Checa	Ducati	23	+1:08.977	34	
18	31	(Italy) Vittorio Iannuzzo	Yamaha	23	+1:10.718	36	
19	27	(Italy) Roberto Panichi	Bimota	23	+1:11.384	28	
20	46	(Italy) Mauro Sanchini	Ducati	23	+1:14.522	29	
21	24	(Italy) Francesco Monaco	Ducati	23	+1:31.097	33	
22	35	(France) Christophe Cogan	Yamaha	23	+1:33.026	23	
23	43	(Italy) Norino Brignola	Bimota	23	+1:51.505	30	
DSQ	53	(South Africa) Brad Anassis	Kawasaki	23	+43.351	16	
Ret	1	(Italy) Fabrizio Pirovano	Suzuki	21	Retired	5	
Ret	6	(Italy) Cristiano Migliorati	Suzuki	21	Retired	24	
Ret	33	(Italy) Luca Conforti	Kawasaki	13	Retired	26	
Ret	50	(South Africa) Greg Dreyer	Honda	12	Retired	13	
Ret	23	(Spain) Rubén Xaus	Yamaha	9	Retired	1	
Ret	20	(Belgium) Werner Daemen	Yamaha	8	Retired	32	
Ret	15	(Italy) Marco Risitano	Yamaha	7	Retired	35	
Ret	69	(Italy) Serafino Foti	Ducati	3	Retired	31	
DNS	56	(South Africa) Stewart MacLeod	Suzuki		Did not start	20	
DNS	5	(Italy) Massimo Meregalli	Yamaha		Did not start	21	
DNS	29	(Italy) Davide Bulega	Ducati		Did not start	14	
DNS	58	(South Africa) Brett MacLeod	Suzuki		Did not start	2	
DNQ	87	(United States) Tripp Nobles	Honda		Grid capacity limit		
DNQ	19	(Italy) Walter Tortoroglio	Suzuki		Grid capacity limit		
DNQ	55	(Italy) Michele Malatesta	Ducati		Grid capacity limit		
DNQ	38	(Sweden) Jan Hanson	Suzuki		Grid capacity limit		
DNQ	57	(Italy) Fabio Carpani	Ducati		Grid capacity limit		
DNQ	49	(Italy) Mario Innamorati	Suzuki		Grid capacity limit		
DNQ	37	(Italy) Marco Borciani	Honda		Grid capacity limit		
DNQ	28	(Spain) Guim Roda	Yamaha		Grid capacity limit		
DNQ	44	(Switzerland) Claude-Alain Jaggi	Honda		Grid capacity limit		
