= Aaron Slight =

New Zealand motorcycle racer (born 1966)

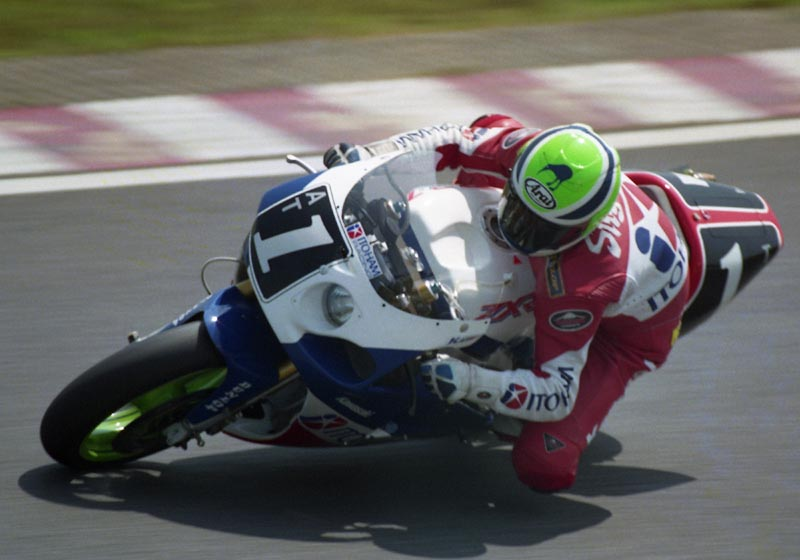
- Aaron Slight in 1993
- Nationality: New Zealander
- Born: 19 January 1966 (age 60); Masterton, New Zealand
Motorcycle racing career statistics
Superbike World Championship
Active years	1988 – 2000
Starts / Wins / Podiums / Poles / F. laps / Points; 229 / 13 / 87 / 8 / 26 / 2834,5

Aaron Tony Slight MNZM (born 19 January 1966) is a New Zealand former professional motorcycle road racer. He competed in the Superbike World Championships from 1988 to 2000, finishing second in the championship twice and third four times. He later competed in car racing and was a television presenter for AA Torque, a motoring show on New Zealand television.

== Motorcycle racing career ==
Born in Masterton, New Zealand, Slight was Australian Superbike Champion in 1991, before spending most of the 1990s racing in the Superbike World Championship, amassing 87 podiums, 13 wins and eight poles. For many years, he was the only rider to win the Suzuka 8 Hours race for three consecutive years, having done so in 1993–1995. This feat has been repeated only recently by multiple Japanese Superbike Champion Katsuyuki Nakasuga in 2015–2018. Although Nakasuga was only declared a winner in 2018 due to being part of the three rider team (with Sam Lowes and Michael Van Der Mark) even though he did not ride in the race due to an injury. Officially, Nakasuga is a four-time-in-a-row winner but in reality he has only matched Slight's three time record respectively.

Slight won his first WSB race during the 1992 season on a Kawasaki for Team Moving Kawasaki. On a factory Castrol Honda he was third overall in 1994 and 1995, taking his first Honda win at Albacete. The only real low note was Laguna Seca in 1995, where a poorly handling Honda and many local wildcards left him 18th on the grid. He was runner-up to Troy Corser in 1996, and third again in 1997 as teammate John Kocinski won the title.

In 1998, Slight was second to Carl Fogarty by 5.5 points (half points having been awarded in the shortened Laguna Seca race 1), only missing the title due to mishaps such as a last-lap engine failure at Monza, a last-lap incident with back-marker Jean-Marc Deletang at Philip Island, and missing race 2 at Laguna Seca due to a startline pileup on the aborted attempt to restart the first race. He did however take his first career double victory, at Misano.

Slight did not win a race in 1999; he crossed the line first in race 1 at Hockenheimring after passing Carl Fogarty on the last lap, but a red flag had been shown due to an incident elsewhere on the track, so the results were taken a lap back. Ironically, as Fogarty had already clinched the title, he did not need to win the race. Slight missed the start of the season in 2000 and then made his final appearance in the opening round of the 2001 American Superbike Championship at Daytona Speedway.

== Car racing career ==
Slight raced in the British Touring Car Championship, ASCAR Racing Series and the British GT Championship.

== Personal life ==
In the 2000 Queen's Birthday Honours, Slight was appointed a Member of the New Zealand Order of Merit, for services to motor sport.

== Racing record ==
=== Superbike World Championship ===
==== Races by year ====
(key) (Races in bold indicate pole position) (Races in italics indicate fastest lap)

Year	Make	1		2		3		4		5		6		7		8		9		10		11		12		13		Pos.	Pts
Year	Make	R1	R2	R1	R2	R1	R2	R1	R2	R1	R2	R1	R2	R1	R2	R1	R2	R1	R2	R1	R2	R1	R2	R1	R2	R1	R2	Pos.	Pts
1988	Bimota	GBR	GBR	HUN	HUN	GER	GER	AUT	AUT	JPN; 7	JPN; 14	FRA	FRA	POR	POR	AUS	AUS	NZL	NZL									42nd	5.5
1989	Kawasaki	GBR	GBR	HUN	HUN	CAN	CAN	USA	USA	AUT	AUT	FRA	FRA	JPN; 9	JPN; 7	GER	GER	ITA	ITA	AUS; 5	AUS; 6	NZL; 2	NZL; Ret					14th	54
1990	Kawasaki	SPA	SPA	GBR	GBR	HUN	HUN	GER	GER	CAN	CAN	USA	USA	AUT	AUT	JPN	JPN	FRA	FRA	ITA	ITA	MAL	MAL	AUS; 8	AUS; 7	NZL; Ret	NZL; 3	19th	32
1991	Kawasaki	GBR	GBR	SPA	SPA	CAN	CAN	USA	USA	AUT	AUT	SMR	SMR	SWE	SWE	JPN; 3	JPN; 4	MAL; 7	MAL; 4	GER	GER	FRA	FRA	ITA	ITA	AUS; Ret	AUS; 3	13th	65
1992	Kawasaki	SPA; 1	SPA; Ret	GBR; 5	GBR; 6	GER; 3	GER; 5	BEL; 6	BEL; 7	SPA; 6	SPA; 5	AUT; 7	AUT; Ret	ITA	ITA	MAL; 4	MAL; 3	JPN; 6	JPN; 4	NED; 7	NED; 4	ITA	ITA	AUS; 4	AUS; 3	NZL; 2	NZL; 3	6th	249
1993	Kawasaki	IRL; 5	IRL; 6	GER; 4	GER; 4	**SPA**; 2	**SPA**; 3	SMR; 6	SMR; 6	AUT; 2	AUT; Ret	CZE; 3	CZE; Ret	SWE; 8	SWE; 5	MAL; 4	MAL; 6	JPN; 6	JPN; 4	NED; 3	NED; 6	ITA; 1	ITA; 2	GBR; 3	GBR; 2	**POR**; 3	**POR**; 5	**3rd**	**316**
1994	Honda	GBR; 2	GBR; Ret	GER; 2	GER; Ret	ITA; 3	ITA; 4	SPA; 2	SPA; 2	AUT; 4	AUT; 4	INA; 2	INA; 2	JPN; 6	JPN; 7	NED; 3	NED; 2	SMR; 4	SMR; 2	EUR; 8	EUR; 10	AUS; 4	AUS; 4					**3rd**	**277**
1995	Honda	GER; 6	GER; 3	SMR; 16	SMR; 13	GBR; 4	GBR; 3	**ITA**; 2	**ITA**; 3	SPA; 1	SPA; 3	AUT; 4	AUT; 4	USA; 9	USA; Ret	EUR; 9	EUR; 8	JPN; 2	JPN; 4	NED; 4	NED; 2	**INA**; 3	**INA**; 1	AUS; 2	AUS; 4			**3rd**	**323**
1996	Honda	SMR; 6	SMR; 5	GBR; 5	GBR; 2	GER; 1	GER; 2	ITA; 2	ITA; 2	CZE; 3	CZE; 2	USA; 5	USA; 3	EUR; 6	EUR; 5	INA; 3	INA; 2	JPN; 6	JPN; 3	NED; 3	NED; 5	SPA; 9	SPA; 6	AUS; Ret	AUS; 2			**2nd**	**347**
1997	Honda	**AUS**; Ret	**AUS**; 1	SMR; 4	SMR; 2	GBR; 1	GBR; 3	GER; 1	GER; Ret	ITA; 2	ITA; 5	USA; 7	USA; 10	EUR; 6	EUR; 8	AUT; 3	AUT; 2	NED; 4	NED; 4	SPA; 2	SPA; 3	JPN; 6	JPN; 4	INA; 2	INA; 4			**3rd**	**343**
1998	Honda	AUS; 9	AUS; 2	GBR; 4	GBR; 4	**ITA**; 2	**ITA**; Ret	SPA; 4	SPA; 2	GER; 1	GER; 4	SMR; 1	SMR; 1	RSA; 8	RSA; 8	USA; 8	USA; DNS	EUR; 2	EUR; 5	**AUT**; 1	**AUT**; 1	NED; 4	NED; 2	JPN; 7	JPN; 6			**2nd**	**347**
1999	Honda	RSA; 3	RSA; 2	AUS; 4	AUS; 4	GBR; 2	GBR; Ret	SPA; 4	SPA; 7	ITA; 5	ITA; Ret	GER; 2	GER; 2	SMR; 5	SMR; 4	USA; 9	USA; 6	EUR; 2	EUR; 2	AUT; Ret	AUT; 3	NED; 3	NED; 3	**GER**; 2	**GER**; 3	JPN; 16	JPN; 13	4th	323
2000	Honda	RSA	RSA	AUS	AUS	JPN	JPN	GBR; 9	GBR; 7	ITA; 5	ITA; 7	GER; 5	GER; 5	SMR; Ret	SMR; 9	SPA; 7	SPA; 7	USA; 8	USA; 9	GBR; 7	GBR; Ret	NED; 5	NED; 4	GER; 5	GER; Ret	GBR; 13	GBR; 8	8th	153

=== Suzuka 8 Hours results ===
Year	Team	Co-Rider	Bike	Pos
1993	(Japan) Itoham Racing Kawasaki	(New Zealand) Aaron Slight (United States) Scott Russell	Kawasaki Ninja ZX-7R	**1st**
1994	(Japan) Team HRC	(New Zealand) Aaron Slight (United States) Doug Polen	Honda RVF750 RC45	**1st**
1995	(Japan) Team HRC	(New Zealand) Aaron Slight (Japan) Tadayuki Okada	Honda RVF750 RC45	**1st**

=== Complete British Touring Car Championship results ===
(key) Races in bold indicate pole position (1 point awarded all races) Races in italics indicate fastest lap (1 point awarded all races) * signifies that driver lead feature race for at least one lap (1 point awarded)

Year	Team	Car	Class	1	2	3	4	5	6	7	8	9	10	11	12	13	14	15	16	17	18	19	20	21	22	23	24	25	26	Pos	Pts
2001	Peugeot Sport UK	Peugeot 406 Coupé	T	BRH; 1	BRH; 2	THR; 1	THR; 2	OUL; 1	OUL; 2	SIL; 1	SIL; 2	MON; 1	MON; 2	DON; 1 ovr:7 cls:7	DON; 2 Ret*	KNO; 1	KNO; 2	SNE; 1	SNE; 2	CRO; 1	CRO; 2	OUL; 1	OUL; 2	SIL; 1	SIL; 2	DON; 1	DON; 2	BRH; 1	BRH; 2	NC†	0†
2002	Barwell Motorsport	Vauxhall Astra Coupé	T	BRH; 1 ovr:9 cls:6	BRH; 2 ovr:12 cls:9	OUL; 1 ovr:6 cls:6	OUL; 2 ovr:8 cls:8	THR; 1 ovr:7 cls:7	THR; 2 DNS	SIL; 1 ovr:10 cls:10	SIL; 2 Ret	MON; 1 DNS	MON; 2 ovr:8 cls:8	CRO; 1 ovr:7 cls:7	CRO; 2 ovr:10 cls:10	SNE; 1 ovr:12 cls:12	SNE; 2 ovr:9 cls:9	KNO; 1 Ret	KNO; 2 ovr:13 cls:12	BRH; 1 Ret	BRH; 2 ovr:9 cls:9	DON; 1 Ret	DON; 2 Ret							13th	32

† Not eligible for points

=== Complete Porsche Supercup results ===
(key) (Races in bold indicate pole position) (Races in italics indicate fastest lap)

Year	Team	Car	1	2	3	4	5	6	7	8	9	10	11	12	DC	Points
2003	Porsche AG	Porsche 996 GT3	ITA1	ESP	AUT	MON	GER1	FRA	GBR; 18	GER2	HUN	ITA2	USA1	USA2	NC‡	0‡

‡ – Guest driver – Not eligible for points.

Preceded by Malcolm Campbell	Australian Superbike Champion; 1991	Succeeded by Mat Mladin
Preceded by Wayne Gardner; Daryl Beattie (1992)	Suzuka 8 Hours Winner; 1993 (with Scott Russell) 1994 (with Doug Polen) 1995 (with Tadayuki Okada)	Succeeded by Colin Edwards; Noriyuki Haga (1996)
