= Nürburgring Superbike World Championship round =

Nürburgring Superbike World Championship round or Nürburg Superbike World Championship round may refer to:

- 1999 Nürburgring Superbike World Championship round
- 2008 Nürburgring Superbike World Championship round
- 2009 Nürburgring Superbike World Championship round
- 2010 Nürburgring Superbike World Championship round
- 2011 Nürburgring Superbike World Championship round

== See also ==
- Nürburgring
