= 1999 Nürburgring Superbike World Championship round =

Motorsport race in Germany

(Germany) 1999 Nürburgring Superbike World Championship round
Round details
- Round 6 of 13 rounds in the 1999 Superbike World Championship. and Round 5 of 11 rounds in the 1999 Supersport World Championship.
- Date: 13 June, 1999
- Location: Nürburgring
- Course: Permanent racing facility 4.556 km (2.831 mi)

Superbike World Championship
Pole position
(United Kingdom) Carl Fogarty
1:38.843
Fastest lap race 1	Fastest lap race 2
(United Kingdom) Carl Fogarty	(Australia) Troy Corser
1:39.705	1:39.318

Supersport World Championship
Pole position
(Germany) Jörg Teuchert
1:43.927
Fastest lap
(Italy) Piergiorgio Bontempi
1:45.591

The 1999 Nürburgring Superbike World Championship round was the 6th round of the 1999 Superbike World Championship season. It took place on the weekend of 11–13 June 1999 at the Nürburgring. It was strongly criticised by the riders after track officials failed to show race flags. Carl Fogarty and Troy Corser won Race 1 and Race 2 respectively.

== Controversy ==
During Race 1, Igor Jerman's Kawasaki dumped oil at the Castrol Curve, causing multiple other riders to crash, including Noriyuki Haga, Akira Yanagawa, Pierfrancesco Chili and Colin Edwards, due to marshals failing to show Oil Flags. The marshals also failed to show Blue Flags and as a result Fogarty collided with back-marker Lothar Kraus, knocking Kraus off his bike and out of both the race and the weekend. Kraus blamed the flag marshals for the incident, as could be seen from his gestures immediately after the crash.

When Edwards went down, he was livid and showed his anger by throwing gravel on the track and showing his middle finger multiple times. After the race Edwards stated "I'm not coming back to this f***ing country ever again", that he didn't care about the second race and that he wanted to go home and play some golf.

== Superbike race 1 classification ==
Pos	No	Rider	Bike	Laps	Time/Retired	Grid	Points
1	1	(United Kingdom) Carl Fogarty	Ducati 996	21	35:12.037	1	25
2	111	(New Zealand) Aaron Slight	Honda RC45	21	+7.262	3	20
3	11	(Australia) Troy Corser	Ducati 996	21	+30.178	5	16
4	6	(Spain) Gregorio Lavilla	Kawasaki ZX-7RR	21	+35.116	8	13
5	9	(Australia) Peter Goddard	Aprilia RSV1000	21	+36.359	10	11
6	21	(Japan) Katsuaki Fujiwara	Suzuki GSX-R750	21	+37.463	11	10
7	22	(Italy) Vittoriano Guareschi	Yamaha R7	21	+48.594	14	9
8	16	(Austria) Andy Meklau	Ducati 996	21	+59.878	13	8
9	72	(Sweden) Christer Lindholm	Yamaha R7	21	+1:11.069	17	7
10	63	(Germany) Jochen Schmid	Kawasaki ZX-7RR	21	+1:11.374	15	6
11	19	(Italy) Lucio Pedercini	Ducati 916	21	+1:11.759	16	5
12	39	(Italy) Alessandro Gramigni	Yamaha R7	21	+1:24.325	18	4
13	70	(Italy) Giovanni Bussei	Suzuki GSX-R750	21	+1:28.715	21	3
14	66	(South Africa) Jonnie Ekerold	Kawasaki ZX-7RR	21	+1:31.515	25	2
15	27	(France) Frédéric Protat	Ducati 996	21	+1:32.908	22	1
16	38	(South Africa) Lance Isaacs	Ducati 996	21	+1:34.715	27	
17	55	(Italy) Mauro Lucchiari	Yamaha R7	21	+1:35.448	19	
18	26	(France) Jean-Pierre Jeandat	Honda RC45	21	+1:44.971	20	
19	71	(United Kingdom) Brian Morrison	Yamaha R7	20	+1 lap	26	
20	24	(Slovakia) Vladimír Karban	Suzuki GSX-R750	20	+1 lap	28	
Ret	5	(United States) Colin Edwards	Honda RC45	12	Crash	2	
Ret	65	(Germany) Michael Schulten	Suzuki GSX-R750	11	Technical	24	
Ret	7	(Italy) Pierfrancesco Chili	Suzuki GSX-R750	9	Crash	4	
Ret	33	(Austria) Robert Ulm	Kawasaki ZX-7RR	9	Crash	9	
Ret	73	(Germany) Lothar Kraus	Kawasaki ZX-7RR	9	Crash	30	
Ret	40	(Italy) Giuliano Sartoni	Ducati 996	9	Technical	31	
Ret	41	(Japan) Noriyuki Haga	Yamaha R7	5	Crash	7	
Ret	4	(Japan) Akira Yanagawa	Kawasaki ZX-7RR	4	Crash	6	
Ret	64	(Australia) Kirk McCarthy	Suzuki GSX-R750	4	Crash	23	
Ret	15	(Slovenia) Igor Jerman	Kawasaki ZX-7RR	3	Technical	12	
Ret	18	(Colombia) Carlos Macias	Ducati 916	3	Crash	29	

== Superbike race 2 classification ==
Pos	No	Rider	Bike	Laps	Time/Retired	Grid	Points
1	11	(Australia) Troy Corser	Ducati 996	21	35:06.897	5	25
2	111	(New Zealand) Aaron Slight	Honda RC45	21	+0.113	3	20
3	4	(Japan) Akira Yanagawa	Kawasaki ZX-7RR	21	+1.087	6	16
4	5	(United States) Colin Edwards	Honda RC45	21	+12.862	2	13
5	7	(Italy) Pierfrancesco Chili	Suzuki GSX-R750	21	+12.962	4	11
6	41	(Japan) Noriyuki Haga	Yamaha R7	21	+15.037	7	10
7	21	(Japan) Katsuaki Fujiwara	Suzuki GSX-R750	21	+24.298	11	9
8	9	(Australia) Peter Goddard	Aprilia RSV1000	21	+25.911	10	8
9	22	(Italy) Vittoriano Guareschi	Yamaha R7	21	+37.931	14	7
10	16	(Austria) Andy Meklau	Ducati 996	21	+38.171	13	6
11	33	(Austria) Robert Ulm	Kawasaki ZX-7RR	21	+47.636	9	5
12	15	(Slovenia) Igor Jerman	Kawasaki ZX-7RR	21	+48.991	12	4
13	19	(Italy) Lucio Pedercini	Ducati 916	21	+1:00.178	16	3
14	72	(Sweden) Christer Lindholm	Yamaha R7	21	+1:02.361	17	2
15	1	(United Kingdom) Carl Fogarty	Ducati 996	21	+1:07.467	1	1
16	63	(Germany) Jochen Schmid	Kawasaki ZX-7RR	21	+1:07.650	15	
17	39	(Italy) Alessandro Gramigni	Yamaha R7	21	+1:19.589	18	
18	55	(Italy) Mauro Lucchiari	Yamaha R7	21	+1:20.250	19	
19	27	(France) Frédéric Protat	Ducati 996	21	+1:29.813	22	
20	64	(Australia) Kirk McCarthy	Suzuki GSX-R750	21	+1:31.055	23	
21	38	(South Africa) Lance Isaacs	Ducati 996	20	+1 lap	27	
22	70	(Italy) Giovanni Bussei	Suzuki GSX-R750	20	+1 lap	21	
23	24	(Slovakia) Vladimír Karban	Suzuki GSX-R750	20	+1 lap	28	
24	18	(Colombia) Carlos Macias	Ducati 916	20	+1 lap	29	
25	40	(Italy) Giuliano Sartoni	Ducati 996	19	+2 laps	31	
Ret	26	(France) Jean-Pierre Jeandat	Honda RC45	17	Technical	20	
Ret	65	(Germany) Michael Schulten	Suzuki GSX-R750	16	Technical	24	
Ret	66	(South Africa) Jonnie Ekerold	Kawasaki ZX-7RR	8	Technical	25	
Ret	71	(United Kingdom) Brian Morrison	Yamaha R7	6	Crash	26	
Ret	6	(Spain) Gregorio Lavilla	Kawasaki ZX-7RR	4	Technical	8	
DNS	73	(Germany) Lothar Kraus	Kawasaki ZX-7RR		Did not start	30	

== Supersport race classification ==
Pos	No	Rider	Bike	Laps	Time/Retired	Grid	Points
1	7	(Italy) Piergiorgio Bontempi	Yamaha	21	37:40.271	9	25
2	1	(Italy) Fabrizio Pirovano	Suzuki	21	+9.782	14	20
3	25	(France) William Costes	Honda	21	+11.715	13	16
4	22	(Germany) Christian Kellner	Yamaha	21	+24.420	2	13
5	35	(France) Christophe Cogan	Yamaha	21	+24.834	27	11
6	19	(Italy) Walter Tortoroglio	Suzuki	21	+25.820	6	10
7	30	(Italy) Giuseppe Fiorillo	Suzuki	21	+39.564	35	9
8	3	(France) Stéphane Chambon	Suzuki	21	+42.234	12	8
9	72	(Germany) Stefan Scheschowitsch	Suzuki	21	+44.051	15	7
10	12	(United Kingdom) Iain MacPherson	Kawasaki	21	+56.768	11	6
11	24	(Italy) Francesco Monaco	Ducati	21	+1:19.191	29	5
12	71	(Germany) Markus Barth	Suzuki	21	+1:29.794	23	4
13	52	(United Kingdom) James Toseland	Honda	21	+1:30.428	28	3
14	8	(Netherlands) Wilco Zeelenberg	Yamaha	21	+1:46.059	10	2
15	37	(Italy) Marco Borciani	Honda	19	+2 laps	36	1
16	16	(France) Sébastien Charpentier	Honda	19	+2 laps	17	
17	42	(Spain) David Checa	Ducati	19	+2 laps	33	
18	70	(Germany) Jürgen Oelschläger	Suzuki	19	+2 laps	21	
19	89	(Germany) Rico Penzkofer	Yamaha	19	+2 laps	32	
20	32	(Spain) José David de Gea	Honda	19	+2 laps	24	
Ret	27	(Italy) Roberto Panichi	Bimota	20	Technical	16	
Ret	18	(Italy) Camillo Mariottini	Kawasaki	15	Technical	31	
Ret	21	(Germany) Jörg Teuchert	Yamaha	10	Crash	1	
Ret	43	(Italy) Norino Brignola	Bimota	8	Technical	25	
Ret	23	(Spain) Rubén Xaus	Yamaha	5	Technical	3	
Ret	17	(Spain) Pere Riba	Honda	5	Technical	5	
Ret	4	(Italy) Paolo Casoli	Ducati	4	Technical	4	
Ret	31	(Italy) Vittorio Iannuzzo	Yamaha	4	Technical	19	
Ret	39	(France) David Muscat	Ducati	3	Technical	26	
Ret	5	(Italy) Massimo Meregalli	Yamaha	2	Technical	7	
Ret	6	(Italy) Cristiano Migliorati	Suzuki	2	Technical	18	
Ret	34	(Switzerland) Yves Briguet	Suzuki	1	Crash	8	
Ret	20	(Belgium) Werner Daemen	Yamaha	1	Crash	22	
Ret	73	(Germany) Thomas Körner	Suzuki	1	Crash	30	
DNS	26	(Italy) Roberto Teneggi	Ducati		Did not start	20	
DNS	29	(Italy) Davide Bulega	Ducati		Did not start	34	
DNQ	15	(Italy) Marco Risitano	Suzuki		Grid capacity limit		
DNQ	33	(Italy) Luca Conforti	Kawasaki		Grid capacity limit		
DNQ	46	(Italy) Mauro Sanchini	Ducati		Grid capacity limit		
DNQ	57	(Italy) Fabio Carpani	Ducati		Grid capacity limit		
DNQ	49	(Italy) Mario Innamorati	Ducati		Grid capacity limit		
DNQ	48	(Portugal) Felisberto Teixeira	Honda		Grid capacity limit		
DNQ	44	(Switzerland) Claude-Alain Jaggi	Honda		Grid capacity limit		
