= Andreas Meklau =

Austrian motorcycle racer

- Nationality: Austrian
- Born: 7 June 1967 (age 59); Bruck an der Mur, Austria
Motorcycle racing career statistics
500cc World Championship
Active years	1993
Manufacturers	ROC-Yamaha
Starts / Wins / Podiums / Poles / F. laps / Points; 14 / 0 / 0 / 0 / 0 / 3
Superbike World Championship
Active years	1991–2000, 2004
Manufacturers	Honda, Ducati, Suzuki
Starts / Wins / Podiums / Poles / F. laps / Points; 143 / 1 / 4 / 0 / 2 / 592.5

Andreas Meklau (born 7 June 1967 in Bruck an der Mur) is an Austrian former motorcycle racer. He competed in the Superbike World Championship for over ten years. He won one race at the Österreichring in 1993.

== Career statistics ==
=== Superbike World Championship ===
==== Races by year ====
(key) (Races in bold indicate pole position) (Races in italics indicate fastest lap)

Year	Make	1		2		3		4		5		6		7		8		9		10		11		12		13		Pos.	Pts
Year	Make	R1	R2	R1	R2	R1	R2	R1	R2	R1	R2	R1	R2	R1	R2	R1	R2	R1	R2	R1	R2	R1	R2	R1	R2	R1	R2	Pos.	Pts
1991	Honda	GBR	GBR	SPA; DNS	SPA; DNS	CAN	CAN	USA	USA	AUT; 24	AUT; 24	SMR	SMR	SWE	SWE	JPN	JPN	MAL	MAL	GER; DNQ	GER; DNQ	FRA; DNS	FRA; DNS	ITA; Ret	ITA; Ret	AUS	AUS	NC	0
1992	Ducati	SPA; DNQ	SPA; DNQ	GBR; Ret	GBR; 25	GER; 13	GER; Ret	BEL	BEL	SPA	SPA	AUT; 12	AUT; 13	ITA; 19	ITA; 17	MAL	MAL	JPN	JPN	NED; 23	NED; 13	ITA; 21	ITA; 18	AUS	AUS	NZL	NZL	36th	13
1993	Ducati	IRL	IRL	GER	GER	SPA	SPA	SMR	SMR	AUT; 1	AUT; 3	CZE	CZE	SWE	SWE	MAL	MAL	JPN	JPN	NED	NED	ITA	ITA	GBR; 7	GBR; 7	POR; 7	POR; 7	15th	63.5
1994	Ducati	GBR; 15	GBR; DSQ	GER; Ret	GER; 10	ITA; 10	ITA; 10	SPA; 7	SPA; 4	AUT; 2	AUT; 2	INA; 6	INA; 5	JPN; 9	JPN; Ret	NED; 9	NED; 12	SMR; 6	SMR; DNS	EUR; 7	EUR; 9	AUS; 14	AUS; 10					6th	148
1995	Ducati	GER; Ret	GER; 11	SMR; 11	SMR; 7	GBR; Ret	GBR; 14	ITA; Ret	ITA; 9	SPA; 8	SPA; 7	AUT; 6	AUT; Ret	USA; 18	USA; Ret	EUR; Ret	EUR; 17	JPN; 16	JPN; 18	NED; 13	NED; Ret	INA; 8	INA; 10	AUS; 18	AUS; 18			13th	72
1996	Ducati	SMR; Ret	SMR; DNS	GBR	GBR	GER; 13	GER; 11	ITA; 12	ITA; 11	CZE; 12	CZE; 12	USA	USA	EUR	EUR	INA	INA	JPN	JPN	NED; 16	NED; 10	SPA; DNS	SPA; 17	AUS	AUS			18th	31
1997	Ducati	AUS; 8	AUS; 15	SMR	SMR	GBR; 17	GBR; 14	GER; 10	GER; 10	ITA; 11	ITA; Ret	USA; DNS	USA; DNS	EUR	EUR	AUT; 15	AUT; 8	NED	NED	SPA	SPA	JPN	JPN	INA	INA			18th	40
1998	Ducati	AUS	AUS	GBR	GBR	ITA; 11	ITA; 9	SPA	SPA	GER; Ret	GER; Ret	SMR; 9	SMR; 9	RSA	RSA	USA	USA	EUR	EUR	AUT; 14	AUT; 13	NED	NED	JPN	JPN			18th	31
1999	Ducati	RSA; 13	RSA; Ret	AUS; 10	AUS; 11	GBR	GBR	SPA; 12	SPA; 11	ITA; 10	ITA; 8	GER; 8	GER; 10	SMR	SMR	USA	USA	EUR; 11	EUR; 12	AUT; Ret	AUT; 7	NED; 8	NED; 9	GER; Ret	GER; 6	JPN; 21	JPN; Ret	11th	94
2000	Ducati	RSA; 11	RSA; 12	AUS; Ret	AUS; 17	JPN; 11	JPN; 12	GBR; 14	GBR; 9	ITA; Ret	ITA; 8	GER; 6	GER; 8	SMR; 11	SMR; 13	SPA; 11	SPA; Ret	USA; 12	USA; Ret	EUR; 13	EUR; 9	NED; Ret	NED; 9	GER; 16	GER; 12	GBR; 23	GBR; 16	13th	91
2004	Suzuki	SPA	SPA	AUS	AUS	SMR	SMR	ITA	ITA	GER; 13	GER; 10	GBR	GBR	USA	USA	EUR	EUR	NED	NED	ITA	ITA	FRA	FRA					28th	9

=== Grand Prix motorcycle racing ===
==== Races by year ====
(key) (Races in bold indicate pole position, races in italics indicate fastest lap)

Year	Class	Bike	1	2	3	4	5	6	7	8	9	10	11	12	13	14	Pos	Pts
1993	500cc	ROC-Yamaha	AUS; 19	MAL; 21	JPN; 24	SPA; 18	AUT; 24	GER; 18	NED; 17	EUR; 13	RSM; Ret	GBR; 17	CZE; 18	ITA; 24	USA; 19	FIM; Ret	35th	3
