= Yamaha YZF-R7 =

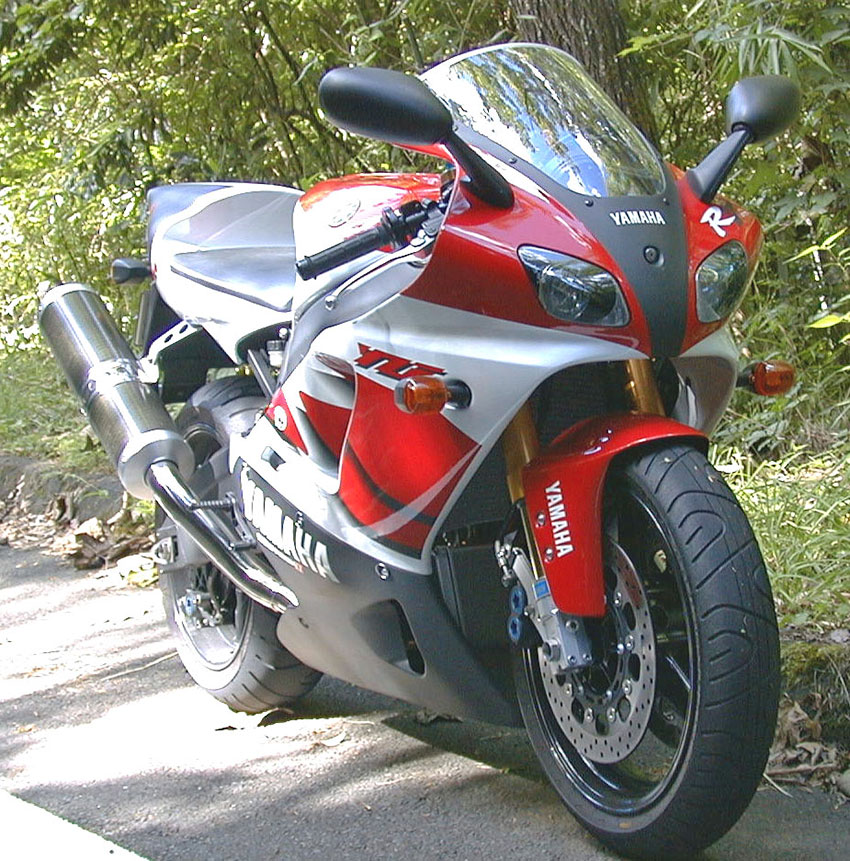
- Manufacturer: Yamaha
- Also called: Yamaha R7; Yamaha OW-02
- Production: 1999
- Assembly: Japan
- Predecessor: Yamaha YZF750
- Class: Sport bike (homologation special)
- Engine: 749 cc (45.7 cu in) liquid-cooled 4-stroke 20-valve DOHC inline-4 with crossplane crankshaft
- Bore / stroke: 72.0 mm × 46.0 mm (2.83 in × 1.81 in)
- Compression ratio: 11.4:1
- Top speed: 230 km/h (143 mph)
- Power: 79 kW (106 hp) @ 11,000 rpm
- Torque: 72 N⋅m (53 lbf⋅ft) @ 8,000 rpm
- Transmission: 6-speed constant mesh
- Suspension: Front: 43 mm Öhlins inverted telescopic forks, preload, compression and rebound damping adjustable Rear: Öhlins piggy-back, preload, compression and rebound damping adjustable
- Brakes: Front: Dual hydraulic disc with 4-piston Rear: Single disc with dual hydraulic piston caliper.
- Tires: Front: 120/70ZR17; Rear: 180/55ZR17
- Wheelbase: 1,400 mm (55 in)
- Dimensions: L: 2,060 mm (81 in); W: 720 mm (28 in)
- Seat height: 840 mm (33 in)
- Weight: 189 kg (416 lb) (dry)
- Fuel capacity: 23 L; 5.0 imp gal (6 US gal)

The Yamaha YZF-R7 or OW-02 (often referred to simply as the R7) is a race homologation motorcycle made by Yamaha in limited production run of 500 units worldwide. It was designed to compete in the Superbike World Championship and Suzuka 8 Hours endurance races.

It has a 749 cc (45.7 cu in), DOHC 20-valve (5 valves per cylinder) inline-four engine producing 79 kW (106 hp). Yamaha also produced two race kits for the R7, topping 101 kW (135 hp) when the other, unused bank of fuel injectors is activated. A pipe and ECU update were also made.

== Overview ==
The R7 was built for racing 'out of the box', implied by the chassis, which was derived from information and geometry from the YZR500 machines of the period. It has Öhlins suspension components and titanium valves, titanium conrods, a shortened Deltabox II frame and dry weight of 189 kg (416 lb).

Super Streetbikes magazine ranked the R7 eighth in its list, "The 10 Most Exotic Bikes Ever", due to its extraordinary price, "top-spec Öhlins race suspension and running gear", and that the bike, "looked utterly amazing: genuine two-wheeled sex", but said it was ironic that in spite of being the "most exotic R-series bike ever", it "actually turned out to be a bit of a lemon". The problem was that the bike as sold was hobbled, at only 100 hp, and that small teams could not afford the "thousands of dollars" of racing upgrades necessary to make the R7 competitive, and when they did, "the crankshafts failed". For the sake of simplicity and cost savings, Yamaha had chosen to detune the engines for bikes imported into all countries to meet the German market's maximum horsepower regulation, partially because whatever level it was detuned to was irrelevant, given that virtually every buyer intended to modify the bike from street-legal form in order to race. One such modification, popular with club racers, was to adapt the frame mounts of the R7 to accept an engine from the Yamaha YZF-R1, which was unofficially named the R71. UK based Harris Performance Products made a bespoke R71 frame that only sold in small numbers.

When the R7 was announced in 1999, 50 were slated to be imported to the US, ten of which were earmarked for Yamaha's factory team. The waiting list for the remaining bikes far exceeded supply. The difficulty in obtaining one prompted Cycle World's Don Canet to caution eager buyers, "Hey, whoah 'er down there, Mr. Trump. Having the cash is not always enough."

In 2001, motorcycling journalist Roland Brown had a high-side crash riding the YZF-R7 of World Superbike racer Noriyuki Haga during testing at Circuito de Jerez, Spain. Cycle World, in a 2016 retrospective, had retired racer Freddie Spencer ride the R7 alongside five other famous racing bikes from the years 1986 through 2013. After riding earlier years' bikes and then moving to the R7, Spencer said, "We've just moved into the modern age. This is the first bike that needs a steering damper." Compared to the other racing motorcycles, the R7 looked "a bit pedestrian", with its stripes and markings being only stickers instead of painted on, and having "a subtlety to it that makes it blend into the crowd."

The OW-02 is regarded by many as a collectible special, due to its rarity as a limited homologation 'special', WorldSBK focused handling (due to its race developed frame strength and geometry) and race styling with a single seat unit, that is distinctive when compared to its road-based siblings, the Yamaha YZF-R6 and Yamaha YZF-R1. After 20+ years since its production, the OW-02 in its OEM form is a rare sight on the road, with many now owned by collectors and kept in storage. With an unknown number of machines either crashed or modified for racing, low-mileage, unmolested examples have appreciated significantly, often selling for well above the original price, with one selling at a Bonhams auction for £37,375 in October 2023 at the Classic Motorcycle Mechanics Show, Staffordshire County Showground in Stafford UK.
