= Kawasaki Ninja ZX-7R =

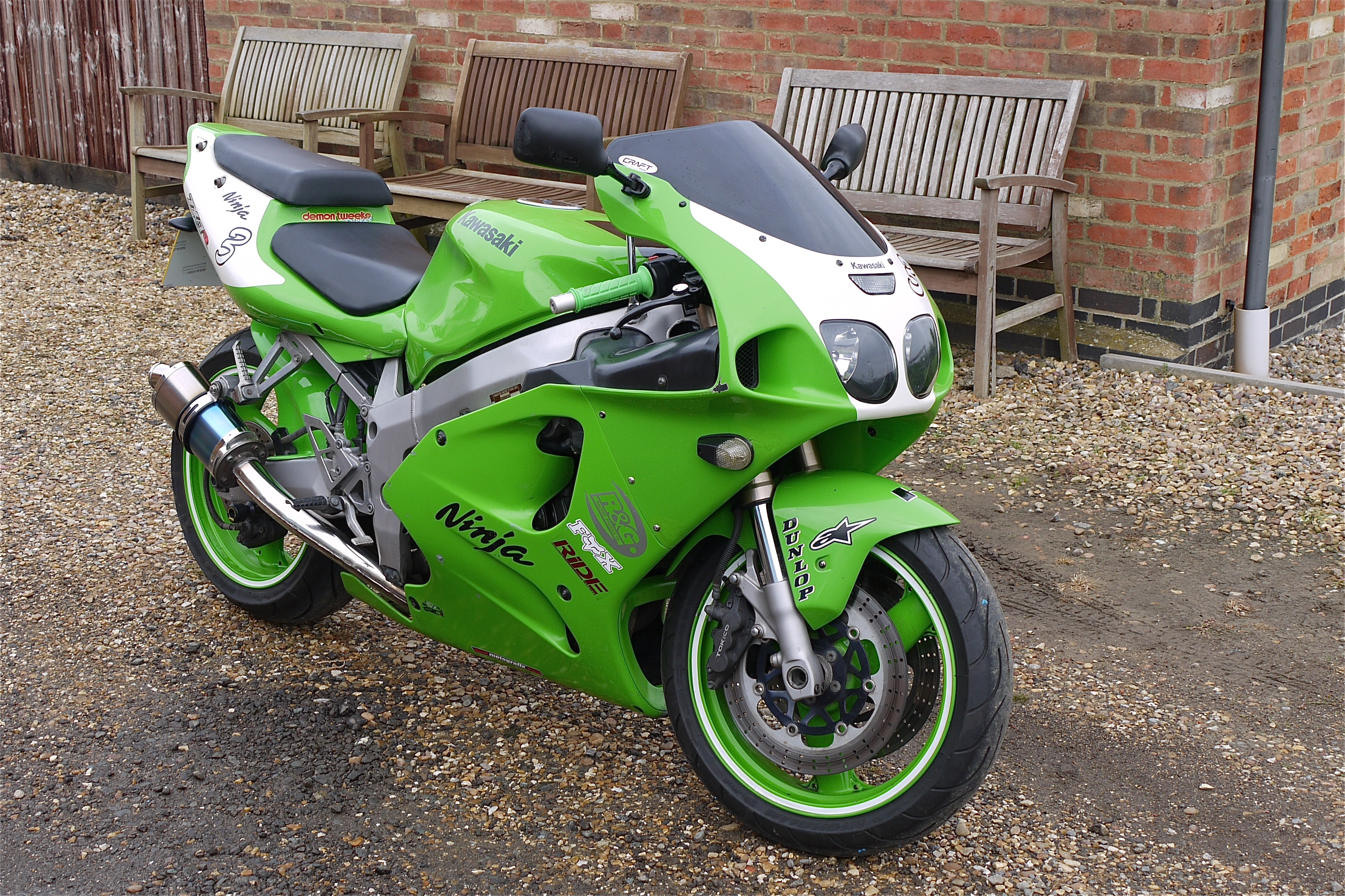
- Manufacturer: Kawasaki Motors
- Also called: 1989-95: ZXR-750 / ZXR-750R; 1989-95 (North America): ZX-7 / ZX-7R; 1996 to 2003: ZX-7R / ZX-7RR
- Parent company: Kawasaki Heavy Industries
- Production: 1989-2003
- Predecessor: GPX750R
- Class: Sport bike
- Engine: 748 cc (45.6 cu in) four-stroke, liquid-cooled, 16-valve DOHC, inline-four
- Bore / stroke: 68 mm × 51.4 mm (2.7 in × 2.0 in) (89–90); 71 mm × 47.3 mm (2.8 in × 1.9 in) (91–95); 73 mm × 44.7 mm (2.9 in × 1.8 in) (96–03)
- Compression ratio: 10.8:1; 11.5:1
- Top speed: 241–262 km/h (150–163 mph)
- Power: 78–92 kW (105–123 hp) (crankshaft)
- Torque: 71.0–76.5 N⋅m (52.4–56.4 lb⋅ft) (rear wheel) @ 9,000 rpm
- Ignition type: Electronic CDI
- Transmission: 6 speed manual
- Frame type: Aluminum twin-spar
- Suspension: Front: Inverted cartridge fork Rear: Uni-Trak (monoshock)
- Brakes: Front: Twin semi-floating front discs with 4 or 6 piston calipers Rear: 230 mm (9.1 in) disc with twin-piston opposed caliper
- Rake, trail: 25.0°, 3.9 in (99 mm)
- Wheelbase: 56 in (1,410 mm) - 57.3 in (1,455 mm)
- Weight: 190 kg (418 lb) - 205 kg (452 lb) (dry)
- Fuel capacity: 18 L; 4.0 imp gal (4.8 US gal)
- Oil capacity: 3,600 ml (3.8 US qt)
- Related: Kawasaki ZXR250; Kawasaki ZXR400; Kawasaki Ninja ZX-6R; Kawasaki Ninja ZX-9R; Kawasaki Ninja ZX-12R

The Kawasaki Ninja ZX-7R was a 750cc motorcycle in the Ninja sport bike series from the Japanese manufacturer Kawasaki produced from 1989 until 2003.

From 1989 through 1995, this motorcycle was marketed as the ZX-7 in the United States. In the European and Asian markets, this motorcycle was sold under the ZXR-750 name. Beginning in 1991, Kawasaki offered a superbike homologation version of the ZX-7, dubbed the ZX-7R in the US and the ZXR-750R worldwide. In 1996 Kawasaki dropped the ZXR name worldwide and the former ZX-7 / ZXR-750 became the ZX-7R and the homologation ZX-7R / ZXR-750R became the ZX-7RR.

== Background ==
Kawasaki developed the ZX-7 in response to the increasing number of racing oriented 750cc sport bikes being produced by its competitors in the late 1980s. By this time, Superbike racing had been growing in popularity worldwide, culminating in the introduction of the Superbike World Championship in 1988. The popularity of superbike racing proved to be a powerful marketing tool for motorcycle manufacturers, and due to the homologation rules, many manufacturers began to produce and sell models especially suited for superbike racing. In 1988, Kawasaki's only 750cc sport bike offering was the GPX 750R which was unable to compete with competitors such as the Honda RC30, Suzuki GSX-R750 and Yamaha FZR-750.

Developed from the prototype ZXR7 endurance race bike, the Kawasaki ZX‑7 was first introduced for the 1989 model year. The ZX-7 received continuous updates throughout the 1990s, and racing versions would go on to win four AMA Superbike Championships and one Superbike World Championship.

== Overview ==
The ZX-7R is powered by a liquid cooled, 749cc in-line four-cylinder with double overhead camshafts and 4 valves per cylinder. The engine case, cylinders and cylinder head are made from aluminum. A multi-plate wet slipper clutch transfers power to a 6 speed transmission.

The frame used on the ZX-7R is an aluminum twin-spar design, constructed of several pressed and cast aluminum sections welded together. The rear subframe is made of welded square tube aluminum, providing enough strength for a pillion passenger.

The double sided aluminum swingarm used largely the same fabrication techniques as the frame. The rear suspension used Kawasaki's Uni-Trak rocker arm system, designed to provide a progressively stiffer damping and spring rate under compression.

== Production Years ==
=== ZX-7 (H1) 1989 ===
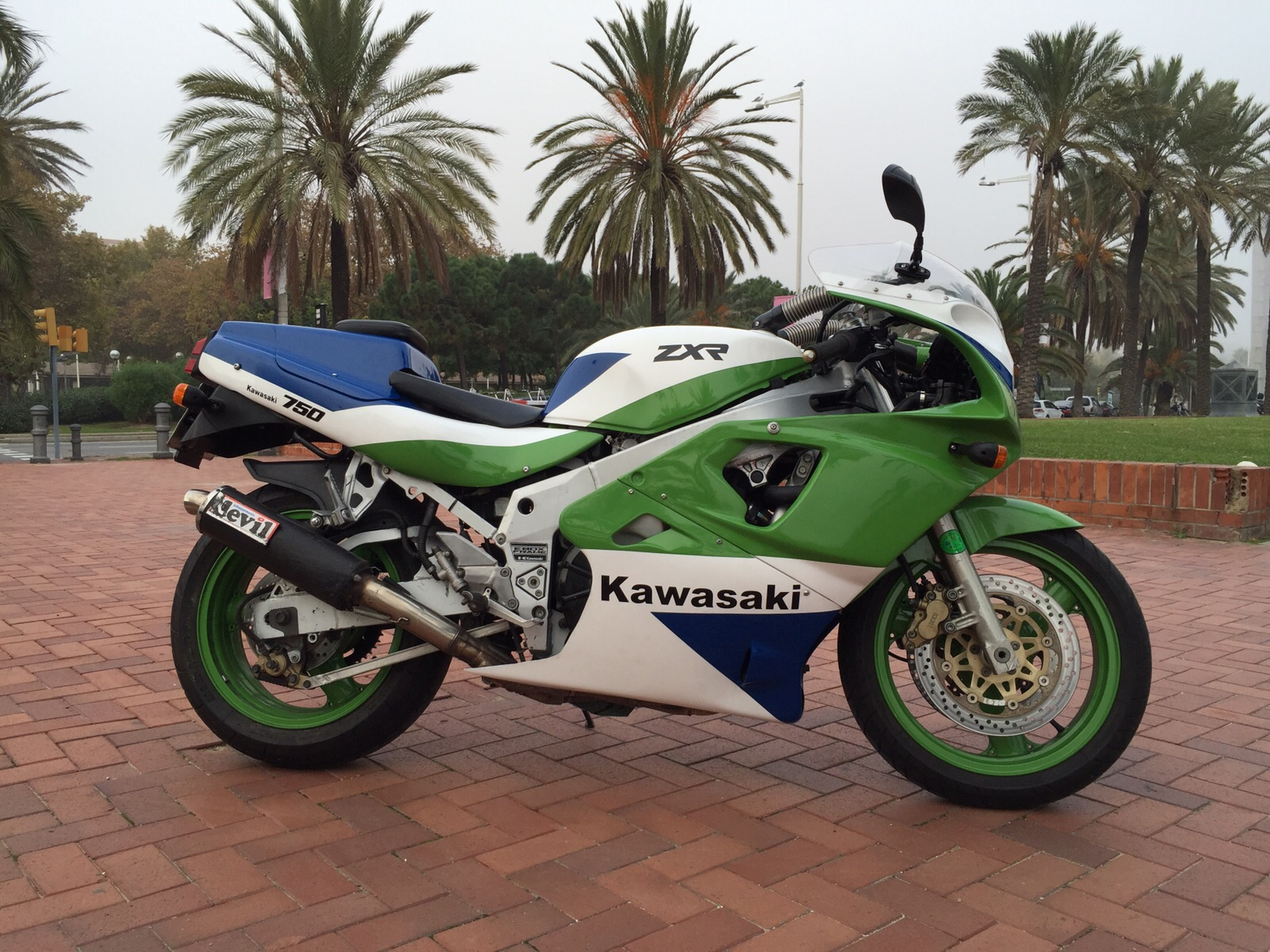
1989 ZX-7

The first year ZX-7 was launched in 1989 and received mixed reviews from motorcycle journalists. Some criticized its weight; 30 lbs heavier than that years Suzuki GSXR750 and 70 lbs heavier than the Honda RC30. Overall it was praised for its approachable handling, albeit with a noticeably stiff rear suspension.

The H1 model produces 107 crankshaft horsepower at 10,500 rpm. The engine is a modified version of the one used in the preceding Ninja GPX750R, receiving a completely new cylinder head design. The cylinder bore is 68mm, stroke is 51.5mm stroke and the compression ratio is 10.8:1. The valves are actuated directly by the camshaft via bucket style tappets. The camshaft drive chain is situated in the middle of the engine, between cylinders 2 and 3. Fueling is accomplished via 4x 36mm Kehin CVKD constant velocity carburetors. Intake air is fed to the air-box through the two tubes run from the front cowling through the fuel tank. The oil is cooled via a separate, oil to air heat exchanger mounted below the radiator. The exhaust header is a 4-2-1 design.

The frame is a twin spar type, with bolt on down tubes cradling the engine. The suspension consists of adjustable 43mm forks at the front and a monoshock at the rear connected to the swingarm with a Unitrak rocker linkage. Front brakes are dual 310mm rotors with 4 piston calipers. The rear brake is a 230mm rotor and two piston caliper. Wheelbase measures 1410mm. Dry weight was measured at 451.9 lbs.

=== ZX-7 (H2) 1990 ===
The 1990 model year inherited many of the items in the "race kit" from the prior year. Engine performance was increased via an upgraded cylinder head with larger ports and valves. Other improvements included larger 38mm carburetors, lighter pistons and connecting rods, and an increased compression ratio of 11.3:1. The oil filter, previously an external spin on design was moved to an internal paper cartridge style. The exhaust header was changed to be a 4-1 style, the radiator was upgraded to a curved design to improve cooling and new oil cooler design was fitted.

The swingarm, previously a box beam type was updated to be a single cast/welded piece. The chassis was stiffened with 1mm thicker aluminum frame sections. Lighter wheels and hollow axles were fitted in an effort to reduce weight. Wheelbase was lengthened to 1455mm. Dry weight was measured at 441 lbs (200 kg).

=== ZX-7 (J1, J2) 1991-92 ===
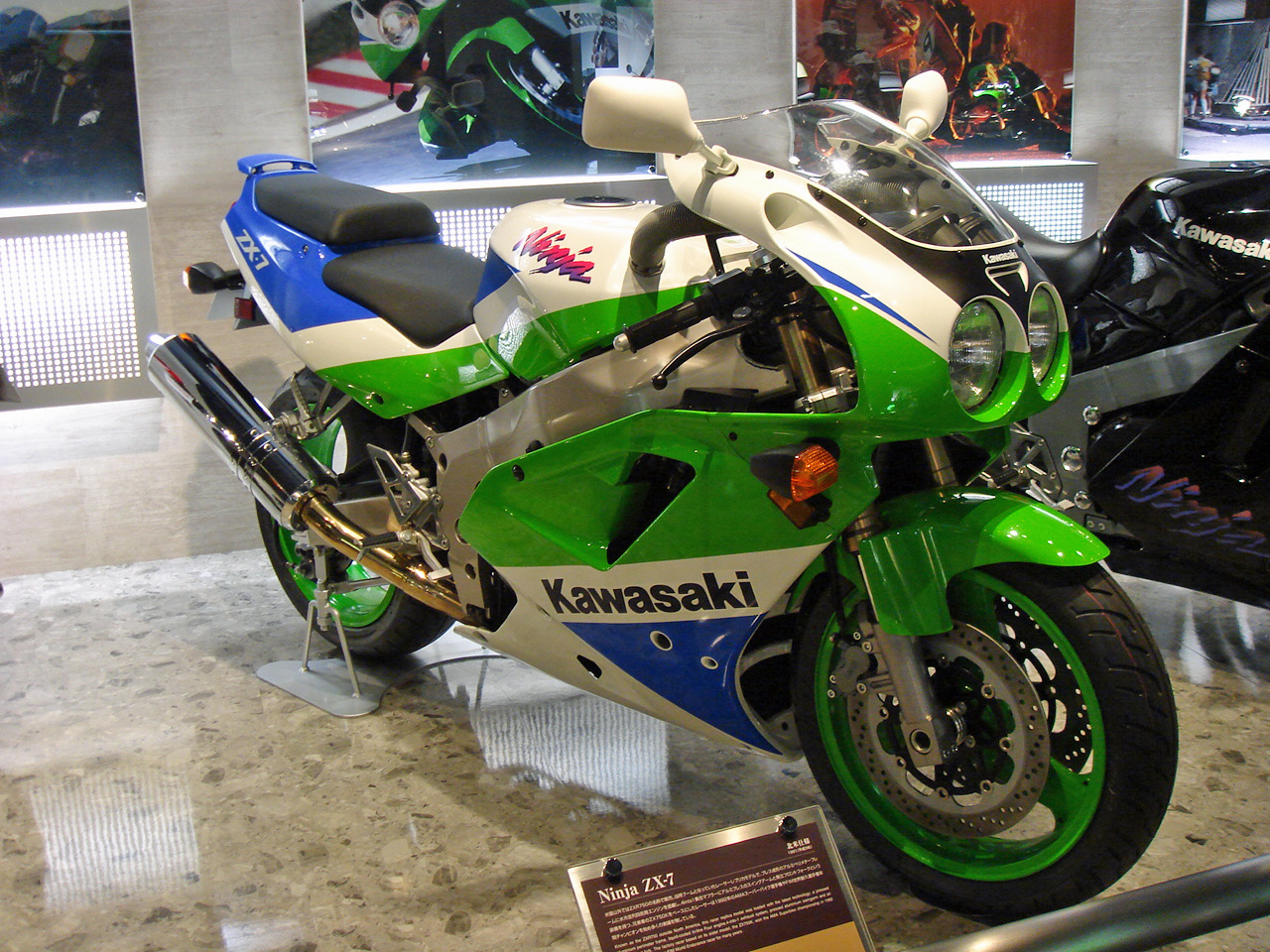
1991 ZX-7

For the 1991 model year, the ZX-7 received a host of changes. An entirely new shorter-stroke engine was introduced with a bore of 71mm and a stroke of 47.3mm. The cam drive chain was moved from the center to the side of the engine, resulting in a 22.6mm shorter crankshaft and narrower engine than previous models despite the larger bore. Other valve train changes include a roller chain replacing the silent chain type, single valve springs, and larger 29mm intake and 25mm exhaust valves actuated via rocker-arm style cam followers instead of the direct bucket actuation on previous models. The cylinder head was redesigned with a smaller 20 degree included valve angle for a more compact combustion chamber, and a steeper intake port with a more direct path to from the carburetors to the combustion chamber. Compression was reduced to 10.8:1. This new engine retained the 38mm Kehin CVKD carburetors from the H2 model. The oil cooler was changed to be an oil-to-coolant style heat exchanger. The engine features dual oil pumps, one dedicated to the lubrication of the engine and transmission, while the other is constantly circulating oil from the oil sump through the oil cooler. The J1 engine also received an updated clutch with one additional friction and steel plate along with a back torque limiter (slipper clutch) mechanism, which permits clutch slippage on high RPM downshifts to prevent wheel chatter. The J1 and J2 models were all deliberately restricted by Kawasaki to 100 hp due to fear of a potential European-wide horsepower limit. This is evidenced by the lower compression ratio and milder cam profile of these models compared to the preceding and succeeding models.

The chassis was lightened and now utilized the engine as a stressed member, removing the bolt on down tubes. Steering stem, swing arm pivot, and axle diameters were all increased to provide additional rigidity. The rake angle is 24.5°. The suspension was fitted with new KYB inverted 41mm cartridge style forks that have adjustable preload and 12 way adjustable rebound. The rear suspension was updated with a more linear Uni-Trak rocker linkage, and a revised shock with 4 way rebound adjustment. Braking was improved with larger 320mm front rotors. The wheelbase was shortened to 1420mm. Rear tire size was increased to 180/55 VR17. This new model weighed roughly 4 lbs less than the prior year. The J2 model received a reduced spring rate in the rear in an effort to make the rear suspension less stiff.

=== ZX-7R (K1, K2) 1991-92 ===
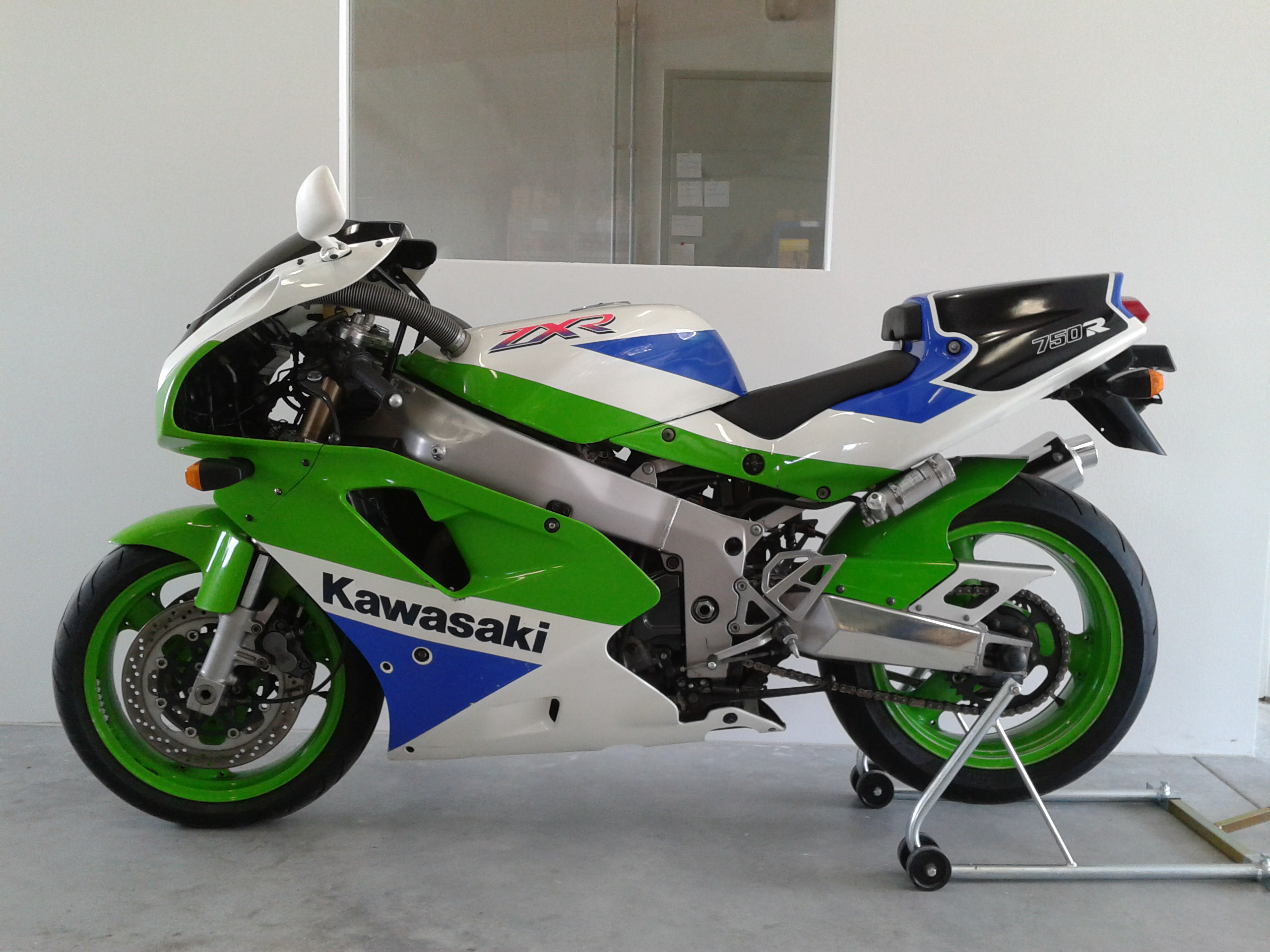
1992 ZX-7R

The 1991 ZX-7R is the first year of the super bike homologation version of the ZX-7. Many changes were made in order to improve performance and usability on the racetrack. The engine is equipped with 39mm Kehin flat slide carburetors with dual accelerator pumps, more aggressive camshafts, dual concentric valve springs, a higher 11.5:1 compression ratio, and a close ratio transmission. This engine produces 121 horsepower at the crankshaft. The flat slide carburetors were equipped with a fuel enricher circuit to improve throttle response at low engine speeds. The fuel enricher circuit consists of a throttle position switch and a fuel solenoid valve. The ignition control unit actuates the solenoid valve to supply fuel pressurized from the fuel pump directly to the accelerator pump nozzles. The fuel enricher circuit is active when the engine is running from 1500-5000rpm and the throttle is opened more than 3/8ths open. The clutch was upgraded with paper based friction discs, replacing the cork based ones equipped on the J1/J2 models.

The front and rear suspension of the K1/K2 is upgraded with fully adjustable suspension. The front forks gained 7 way compression damping adjustment and the rear shock received an external reservoir with 20 way compression damping adjustment. Many efforts were made to reduce the weight of this model. The steel fuel tank of the ZX-7 was replaced with an aluminum version which weighs 2 kg less. The ZX-7R has only a single rear seat, removing the need for an extended subframe and passenger foot pegs. The battery is a smaller 8AH version, compared to 10AH on the J1/J2. The weight saving efforts added up to the R model being 20 pounds lighter than the base ZX-7.

=== ZX-7 (L1, L2, L3) 1993-95 ===
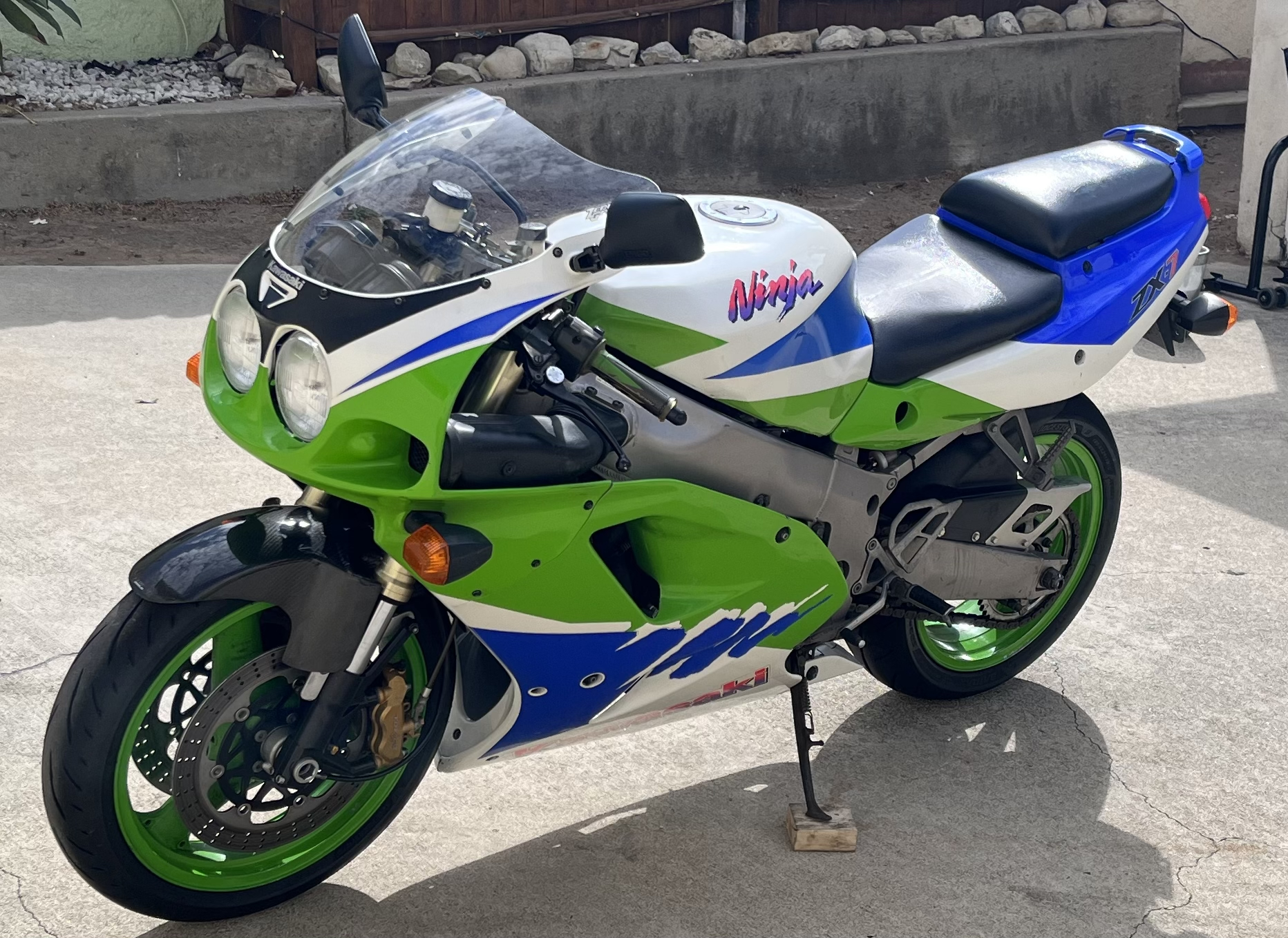
1993 ZX-7 with single ram air inlet in front cowl

The 1993 ZX-7 is the first model to feature Ram-Air; an engine air intake positioned next to the headlights on the front fairing. The ram air intake is ducted from the front of the motorcycle, through the frame and into the bottom side of the engine air-box. This system is designed to take advantage of the motorcycle's velocity, allowing for the stagnation pressure of air at the front of the bike to provide a positive pressure to the engine intake. Another advantage is the cooler air temperature seen at the front of the motorcycles as compared to next to the engine.

The 1993 ZX-7 inherited the ZX-7R motor from the previous year, minus the flat slide carburetors and close ratio transmission. The engine has a bore of 71mm, stroke of 47.3mm, compression ratio of 11.5:1 and breathes through 4x Kehin 38mm CVKD carburetors. The engine produces 118 hp at the crank and 54.3 lb-ft of torque.

Chassis improvements include a stiffer and lighter frame, and a revised, more linear Uni-track linkage at the rear. The rake angle remained at 24.5°.These updates addressed many of the handling problems with the previous models, specifically regarding rear suspension stiffness. The wheelbase was lengthened slightly to 1430mm. Dry weight increased 19 lbs over the previous year.

=== ZX-7R (M1, M2) 1993-94 ===
The 1993 ZX-7R received the same major updates as the ZX-7, benefiting from the addition of Ram-air. The ZX-7R engine is equipped with 39mm Kehin FVKD flat slide carburetors and a close ratio 6-speed transmission, producing 121 horsepower at the crankshaft.

One update not received by the ZX-7R was the revised rear shock and linkage, instead the older, stiffer setup was carried over. The front forks have additional adjustability, with 13 way rebound and 8 way compression adjustment. This ZX-7R introduced an adjustable swingarm pivot allowing for further adjustment of the bikes handling characteristics. Like the previous ZX-7R, this model received an aluminum fuel tank for weight savings. The subframe is also smaller to save weight without the need to support a passenger. Dry weight was measured at 431 lbs (200 kg).

=== ZX-7R (P1-P7) 1996-2003 ===
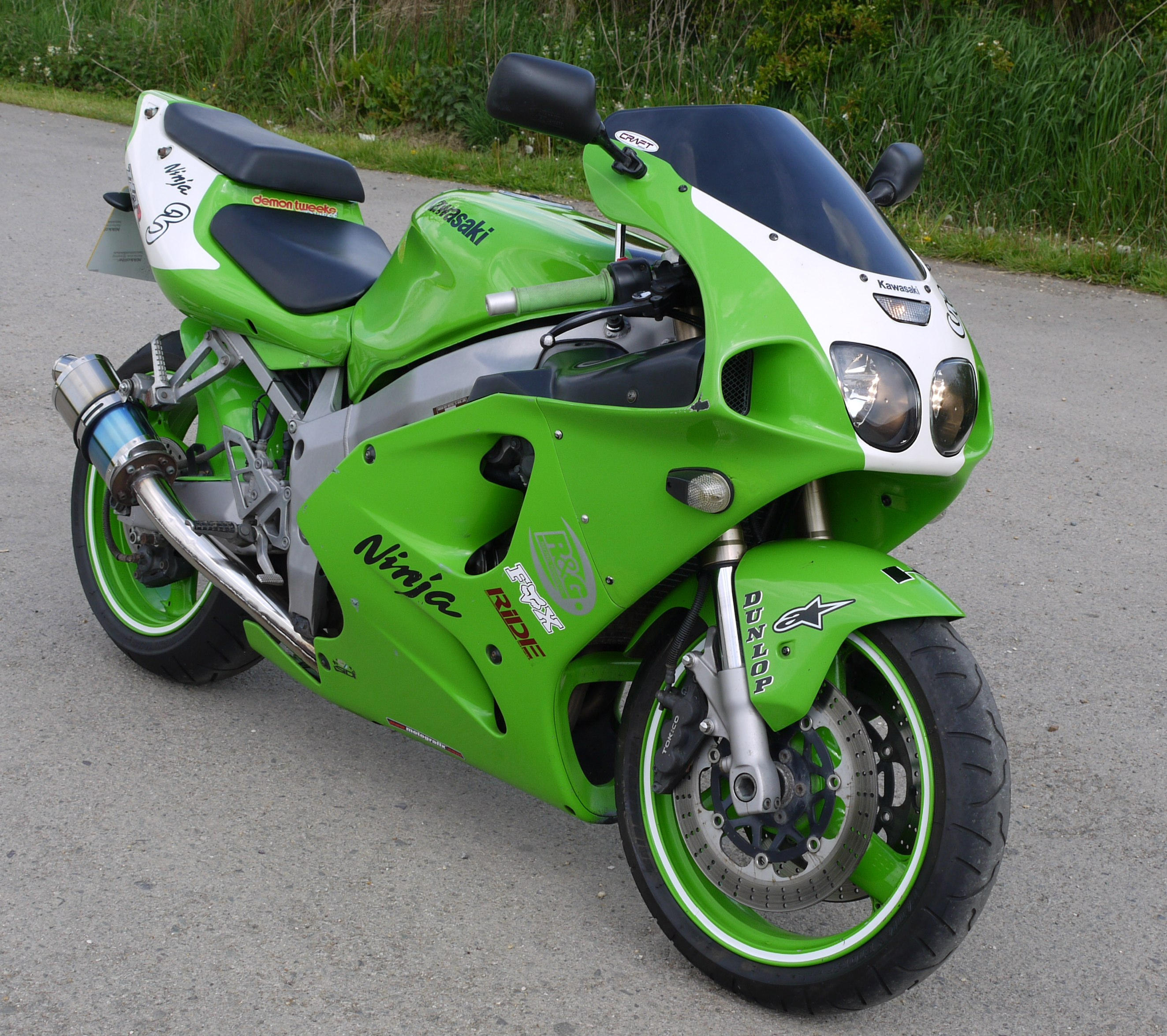
1996 ZX-7R

In 1996, Kawasaki changed the U.S. naming convention for its 750cc sport bikes. The ZX-7 was now to be known as the ZX-7R and the ZX-7R became the ZX-7RR.

This model year was a large update to the 750cc Kawasaki, receiving an entirely new engine and dual Ram-air inlets. The engine has a bore of 73mm and a stroke of 44.7mm. The rocker-arm style cam followers of previous years was replaced with a direct actuation bucket style, reducing valve-train inertia and allowing for higher engine RPM. The throttle pulley was moved from the far right side of the engine to the middle, reducing free play in the throttle butterflies in an effort to stabilize idle RPM. The cylinder head received a wider, 25 degree valve angle compared to the previous years 20 degrees. The larger cylinder bore necessitated the move to a closed deck cylinder, and the cylinder head received oiling and cooling improvements. The exhaust header was updated to be a 4-2-1 style instead of the previous year's 4–1. This engine produced 123 crankshaft horsepower.

The chassis was updated with a stiffer frame and larger 43mm forks with added adjustment for rebound. The rear shock also gained additional adjustability with 20 way compression adjustment and 4 way rebound adjustment. Braking was improved with new 6-piston Tokiko front calipers. Total dry weight was 448 lbs (203 kg).

=== ZX-7RR (N1) 1996 ===
The 1996 ZX-7RR received track focused improvements to both the engine and chassis. The upgraded engine included; larger Kehin FVKD 41mm flat slide carburetors, a stronger paper-based clutch lining, quick-change camshaft sprocket, close ratio transmission and a heavier flywheel to prevent rear wheel spin while cornering.

The chassis featured an adjustable swing arm pivot and adjustable steering head, allowing changes to rake and trail. The perimeter frame was stiffened with gusseting near the rear of the engine. The subframe was shortened to accommodate only one rider and was made out of aluminum.

The suspension received additional adjustability; 28 way compression and 13 way rebound on the front forks, 20 way compression and 18 way rebound on the rear shock. The 6-piston Tokiko calipers on the standard model were swapped out for 6-piston Nissin units. A smaller 8AH battery is fitted for weight savings.

1996 was the only year the ZX-7RR was sold.

== Racing ==
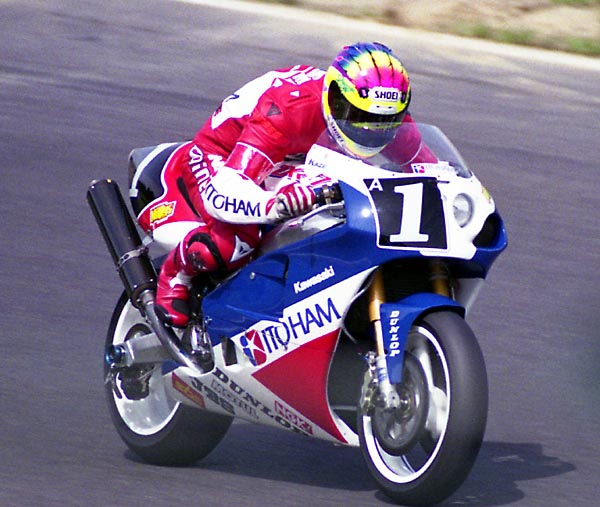
Scott Russell riding a ZXR-7 at the 1993 Suzuka 8 Hour

The ZX-7 was raced by both factory Kawasaki and privateer teams during its production run. Racing variants of the ZX-7R and ZX-7RR attained notable achievements in a variety of motorcycle racing events:

- Kawasaki returned to the FIM Endurance World Championship in 1988 fielding the then new ZXR-7. Kawasaki went on to win the championship in 1991, 1992, 1993, 1994, 1996.
- In 1990, Doug Chandler won the AMA Superbike Championship riding on a Team Muzzy race prepped ZX-7.
- In 1990, 1991 and 1992, Scott Russell won the AMA 750 Supersport championship riding on a Team Muzzy race prepped ZX-7. Russel went undefeated in 1991 riding the ZX-7, winning all 9 rounds of the series.
- In 1992, Scott Russell won the AMA Superbike Championship riding on a Team Muzzy race prepped ZX-7R.
- In 1993, again riding on a Team Muzzy race prepped ZXR-750R, Scott Russel won the Superbike World Championship, giving Kawasaki their first WSBK championship.
- Riding a race prepped version of the then new 1996 ZX-7RR, Team Muzzy and Doug Chandler came back to win the AMA Superbike Championship again in 1996 and 1997.
- The ZX-7 won the Canadian Superbike Championship every year from 1991 to 1999.
- In 1992, John Reynolds won the British Superbike Championship riding a Team Green ZXR-750R.
