= 1996 Superbike World Championship =

1996 Superbike World Championship
Previous:	1995	Next:	1997

The 1996 Superbike World Championship was the ninth FIM Superbike World Championship season. The season started on 14 April at Misano and finished on 27 October at Phillip Island after 12 rounds.

Troy Corser won the riders' championship with 7 victories and Ducati won the manufacturers' championship.

== Race calendar and results ==
1996 Superbike World Championship Calendar
Round		Circuit	Date	Pole position	Fastest lap	Winning rider	Winning team	Report
1	R1	(San Marino) Misano	14 April	(United States) John Kocinski	(United States) John Kocinski	(United States) John Kocinski	Ducati Corse	Report
1	R2	(San Marino) Misano	14 April	(United States) John Kocinski	(Australia) Troy Corser	(United States) John Kocinski	Ducati Corse	Report
2	R1	(United Kingdom) Donington	28 April	(Australia) Troy Corser	(Australia) Troy Corser	(Australia) Troy Corser	Promotor Power Horse	Report
2	R2	(United Kingdom) Donington	28 April	(Australia) Troy Corser	(New Zealand) Aaron Slight	(Australia) Troy Corser	Promotor Power Horse	Report
3	R1	(Germany) Hockenheim	12 May	(Italy) Pierfrancesco Chili	(Australia) Troy Corser	(New Zealand) Aaron Slight	Castrol Honda	Report
3	R2	(Germany) Hockenheim	12 May	(Italy) Pierfrancesco Chili	(New Zealand) Aaron Slight	(United Kingdom) Carl Fogarty	Castrol Honda	Report
4	R1	(Italy) Monza	16 June	(Italy) Pierfrancesco Chili	(Italy) Pierfrancesco Chili	(United Kingdom) Carl Fogarty	Castrol Honda	Report
4	R2	(Italy) Monza	16 June	(Italy) Pierfrancesco Chili	(Australia) Troy Corser	(Italy) Pierfrancesco Chili	Team Gattolone	Report
5	R1	(Czech Republic) Brno	30 June	(Australia) Troy Corser	(Australia) Troy Corser	(Australia) Troy Corser	Promotor Power Horse	Report
5	R2	(Czech Republic) Brno	30 June	(Australia) Troy Corser	(Australia) Troy Corser	(Australia) Troy Corser	Promotor Power Horse	Report
6	R1	(United States) Laguna Seca	21 July	(United States) John Kocinski	(Australia) Anthony Gobert	(United States) John Kocinski	Ducati Corse	Report
6	R2	(United States) Laguna Seca	21 July	(United States) John Kocinski	(Japan) Wataru Yoshikawa	(Australia) Anthony Gobert	Team Kawasaki Muzzy	Report
7	R1	(Europe) Brands Hatch	4 August	(Australia) Troy Corser	(United States) John Kocinski	(Italy) Pierfrancesco Chili	Team Gattolone	Report
7	R2	(Europe) Brands Hatch	4 August	(Australia) Troy Corser	(Australia) Troy Corser	(Australia) Troy Corser	Promotor Power Horse	Report
8	R1	(Indonesia) Sentul	18 August	(United States) Colin Edwards	(United Kingdom) Carl Fogarty	(United States) John Kocinski	Ducati Corse	Report
8	R2	(Indonesia) Sentul	18 August	(United States) Colin Edwards	(United States) John Kocinski	(United States) John Kocinski	Ducati Corse	Report
9	R1	(Japan) Sugo	25 August	(Australia) Troy Corser	(Japan) Noriyuki Haga	(Japan) Yuichi Takeda	HRC Honda Racing	Report
9	R2	(Japan) Sugo	25 August	(Australia) Troy Corser	(Japan) Takuma Aoki	(Japan) Takuma Aoki	HRC Honda Racing	Report
10	R1	(Netherlands) Assen	8 September	(United States) John Kocinski	(United Kingdom) Carl Fogarty	(United Kingdom) Carl Fogarty	Castrol Honda	Report
10	R2	(Netherlands) Assen	8 September	(United States) John Kocinski	(United States) John Kocinski	(United Kingdom) Carl Fogarty	Castrol Honda	Report
11	R1	(Spain) Albacete	6 October	(Australia) Troy Corser	(Australia) Troy Corser	(Australia) Troy Corser	Promotor Power Horse	Report
11	R2	(Spain) Albacete	6 October	(Australia) Troy Corser	(Australia) Troy Corser	(Australia) Troy Corser	Promotor Power Horse	Report
12	R1	(Australia) Phillip Island	27 October	(United States) Colin Edwards	(New Zealand) Aaron Slight	(Australia) Anthony Gobert	Team Kawasaki Muzzy	Report
12	R2	(Australia) Phillip Island	27 October	(United States) Colin Edwards	(New Zealand) Aaron Slight	(Australia) Anthony Gobert	Team Kawasaki Muzzy	Report

== Championship standings ==
=== Riders' standings ===
1996 final riders' standings
Pos.	Rider	Bike	SMR (San Marino)		GBR (United Kingdom)		GER (Germany)		ITA (Italy)		CZE (Czech Republic)		USA (United States)		EUR (Europe)		INA (Indonesia)		JPN (Japan)		NED (Netherlands)		ESP (Spain)		AUS (Australia)		Pts
Pos.	Rider	Bike	R1	R2	R1	R2	R1	R2	R1	R2	R1	R2	R1	R2	R1	R2	R1	R2	R1	R2	R1	R2	R1	R2	R1	R2	Pts
1	(Australia) Troy Corser	Ducati	2	2	**1**	**1**	Ret	Ret	5	4	**1**	**1**	2	2	**Ret**	**1**	6	5	**4**	**9**	4	2	**1**	**1**	3	NC	369
2	(New Zealand) Aaron Slight	Honda	6	5	5	2	1	2	2	2	3	2	5	3	6	5	3	2	6	3	3	5	9	6	Ret	2	347
3	(United States) John Kocinski	Ducati	**1**	**1**	7	6	2	3	Ret	Ret	4	6	**1**	**12**	3	Ret	1	1	5	2	**5**	**3**	3	2	7	5	337
4	(United Kingdom) Carl Fogarty	Honda	7	6	8	7	5	1	1	3	2	3	8	4	5	Ret	2	3	8	4	1	1	5	7	4	6	331
5	(United States) Colin Edwards	Yamaha	11	7	6	4	3	5	3	5	6	7	4	Ret	4	3	**5**	**4**	DNS	DNS			2	3	**2**	**3**	248
6	(Italy) Pierfrancesco Chili	Ducati	3	3	4	5	**Ret**	**Ret**	**4**	**1**	8	10	Ret	7	1	2	4	Ret	Ret	DNS	2	4	Ret	Ret	8	9	223
7	(New Zealand) Simon Crafar	Kawasaki	4	4	2	Ret	4	4	9	Ret	10	9	7	5	9	Ret	12	11	Ret	11	8	8	4	4	Ret	11	180
8	(Australia) Anthony Gobert	Kawasaki	5	DSQ	3	3	6	Ret	Ret	10	Ret	19	Ret	1	2	4	DNS	DNS							1	1	167
9	(Japan) Wataru Yoshikawa	Yamaha	9	11	9	12	DNS	DNS			9	11	9	8	10	6	7	7	3	8	10	7	6	5	6	7	163
10	(United Kingdom) Neil Hodgson	Ducati	12	Ret	DNS	DNS	DNS	DNS	6	9	11	4	3	9	8	Ret	Ret	8	13	14	7	6	8	8	Ret	12	122
11	(United States) Mike Hale	Ducati	13	8	14	16	Ret	8			7	5	6	10	12	11	10	9	20	22	11	12	10	Ret	9	4	114
12	(United Kingdom) John Reynolds	Suzuki	17	Ret	DNS	DNS	DNS	DNS	15	7	5	8	Ret	DNS	7	8	9	6	14	12	13	Ret	7	9	11	10	99
13	(Australia) Kirk McCarthy	Suzuki	Ret	12	13	14	10	9	8	8	14	Ret	10	13	Ret	10	13	10	17	18	14	9	Ret	15	10	15	81
14	(Italy) Paolo Casoli	Ducati	Ret	13	11	9	7	6	Ret	Ret	Ret	14	11	11	Ret	7	8	Ret	Ret	Ret	Ret	11	14	Ret			70
15	(Italy) Piergiorgio Bontempi	Kawasaki	10	10	10	11	12	13	Ret	DNS	18	16	13	16	13	9	11	12	22	20	15	Ret	13	13	12	Ret	63
16	(Sweden) Christer Lindholm	Ducati	8	9	Ret	8	8	7	10	14	Ret	13									9	Ret					58
17	(United Kingdom) James Whitham	Yamaha					Ret	10	7	6					Ret	Ret					6	14					37
18	(Austria) Andreas Meklau	Ducati	Ret	DNS			13	11	12	11	12	12									16	10	DNS	17			31
19	(Japan) Takuma Aoki	Honda																	11	1							30
20	(Japan) Yuichi Takeda	Honda																	1	Ret							25
21	(Germany) Jochen Schmid	Kawasaki	16	14	12	Ret	9	Ret	16	Ret	13	Ret											15	10			23
22	(Japan) Noriyuki Haga	Yamaha																	2	DSQ							20
23	(Japan) Norihiko Fujiwara	Yamaha																	7	5							20
24	(Australia) Peter Goddard	Suzuki																							5	8	19
25	(Japan) Akira Ryō	Kawasaki																	9	6							17
26	(Japan) Shinya Takeishi	Kawasaki																	10	7							15
27	(Switzerland) Roger Kellenberger	Honda					11	10													Ret	17					11
28	(United Kingdom) Brian Morrison	Ducati	14	Ret					11	12																	11
29	(United States) Doug Chandler	Kawasaki											Ret	6													10
30	(Japan) Keiichi Kitagawa	Suzuki																	12	10							10
31	(Belgium) Michael Paquay	Ducati	15	15	Ret	Ret	15	Ret	Ret	13	17	17			Ret	12	Ret	Ret	Ret	DNS	17	Ret	17	Ret			10
32	(Spain) Gregorio Lavilla	Yamaha																					11	12			9
33	(Australia) Rob Phillis	Kawasaki					Ret	14	Ret	15	15	15					15	13							17	16	9
34	(United Kingdom) Niall Mackenzie	Yamaha			16	13									11	Ret											8
35	(Netherlands) Jeffrey de Vries	Yamaha																			12	13					7
36	(United Kingdom) Sean Emmett	Ducati																			18	15	12	14	Ret	Ret	7
37	(United States) Larry Pegram	Ducati											12	14													6
38	(Australia) Martin Craggill	Kawasaki															Ret	Ret					Ret	11			5
39	(Australia) Shawn Giles	Ducati							13	Ret	Ret	DNS			18	14									Ret	17	5
40	(Australia) Dean Thomas	Honda															14	Ret							15	14	5
41	(Greece) Ioannis Boustas	Ducati	23	Ret	19	21	22	17	22	17	16	Ret	14	Ret	15	Ret	Ret	14	Ret	Ret							5
42	(Germany) Udo Mark	Yamaha					17	12																			4
43	(France) Stéphane Chambon	Ducati	18	16	15	15	14	19	17	Ret																	4
44	(Australia) Craig Connell	Ducati																							18	13	3
45	(Australia) Damon Buckmaster	Suzuki																							13	Ret	3
46	(Japan) Yukio Nukumi	Ducati																	Ret	13							3
47	(United Kingdom) Jim Moodie	Ducati			Ret	Ret									Ret	13											3
48	(Australia) Steve Martin	Suzuki															Ret	15							14	Ret	3
49	(Slovenia) Igor Jerman	Kawasaki	25	Ret	22	19	19	Ret	14	16	19	18	Ret	17	19	15	16	Ret	24	24	19	16	19	19	16	18	3
50	(United Kingdom) Ian Simpson	Ducati			Ret	Ret									14	Ret											2
51	(Japan) Tamaki Serizawa	Suzuki																	15	15							2
52	(United States) Mike Smith	Kawasaki											15	15													2
53	(Italy) Ferdinando Di Maso	Ducati	20	17			23	15	Ret	Ret																	1
	(France) Florian Ferracci	Ducati					16	Ret																			0
	(Germany) Anton Gruschka	Yamaha	Ret	Ret			Ret	16			20	21															0
	(United States) Mark Miller	Suzuki											16	18													0
	(United Kingdom) Dean Ashton	Ducati			Ret	Ret									16	Ret											0
	(Denmark) Anders Rasmussen	Yamaha	24	18	Ret	DNS	Ret	18	18	19					20	16											0
	(United Kingdom) David Jefferies	Honda			17	17																					0
	(United Kingdom) Brett Sampson	Kawasaki													17	17											0
	(United Kingdom) Ray Stringer	Kawasaki			18	Ret									Ret	Ret											0
	(United Kingdom) Michael Rutter	Ducati			Ret	18									Ret	Ret											0
	(Spain) Eustaquio Gavira	Honda					18	Ret																			0
	(Italy) Bruno Cirafici	Suzuki	DNS	DNS			21	Ret	Ret	18																	0
	(Indonesia) Simon Yudha Kusuma	Kawasaki															18	DNS									0
	(Germany) Bernhard Schick	Ducati	19	Ret																							0
	(Italy) Antonio Giangiacomo	Ducati	Ret	Ret					19	DNS	23	Ret															0
	(United Kingdom) Alex Buckingham	Yamaha			20	23									Ret	Ret											0
	(United Kingdom) Graham Ward	Ducati			Ret	20									Ret	Ret											0
	(Switzerland) Andreas Hofmann	Suzuki					20	Ret																			0
	(Italy) Bruno Scatola	Kawasaki							20	Ret																	0
	(Italy) Lino Pittaluga	Yamaha							21	20																	0
	(Austria) Gerhard Esterer	Kawasaki									22	20															0
	(Italy) Redamo Assirelli	Yamaha	21	Ret																							0
	(Switzerland) Bernard Hanggeli	Honda	22	Ret	21	22																					0
	(Czech Republic) Michal Bursa	Kawasaki									21	23															0
	(Switzerland) Eric Maillard										Ret	22															0
	(Czech Republic) Jiri Mrkyvka	Kawasaki									Ret	24															0
	(United Kingdom) Shaun Muir	Kawasaki			Ret	Ret																					0
	(France) Jean-Marc Delétang	Yamaha							Ret	Ret																	0
	(Austria) Herman Schmid	Kawasaki									Ret	Ret															0
	(Italy) Alessandro Gramigni	Ducati											Ret	Ret													0
	(Canada) Miguel Duhamel	Honda											Ret	Ret													0
	(Austria) Kurt Czismazia	Ducati									Ret	DNS															0
	(United States) James Randolph	Ducati											Ret	DNS													0
	(United States) Michael Barnes	Ducati											Ret	DNS													0
	(United Kingdom) Matt Llewellyn	Ducati			DNS	DNS																					0
	(Switzerland) Marcel Kellenberger	Kawasaki					DNS	DNS																			0
	(France) Jean-Louis Tranois	Yamaha							DNS	DNS																	0
	(Czech Republic) Petr Šalé	Ducati									DNS	DNS															0
	(Indonesia) Joenzindy Gozali	Kawasaki															DNQ	DNQ									0
	(Indonesia) Affandi Bar	Kawasaki															DNQ	DNQ									0
	(Indonesia) Dudu Karnada	Yamaha															DNQ	DNQ									0
	(Indonesia) Dadan Nugraha	Suzuki															DNQ	DNQ									0
	(Indonesia) Eddy S. Otto	Kawasaki															DNQ	DNQ									0
Pos.	Rider	Bike	SMR (San Marino)		GBR (United Kingdom)		GER (Germany)		ITA (Italy)		CZE (Czech Republic)		USA (United States)		EUR (Europe)		INA (Indonesia)		JPN (Japan)		NED (Netherlands)		ESP (Spain)		AUS (Australia)		Pts

Colour	Result
Gold	Winner
Silver	Second place
Bronze	Third place
Green	Points classification
Blue	Non-points classification
Blue	Non-classified finish (NC)
Purple	Retired, not classified (Ret)
Red	Did not qualify (DNQ)
Red	Did not pre-qualify (DNPQ)
Black	Disqualified (DSQ)
White	Did not start (DNS)
White	Withdrew (WD)
White	Race cancelled (C)
Blank	Did not practice (DNP)
Blank	Did not arrive (DNA)
Blank	Excluded (EX)

**Bold** – Pole position
Italics – Fastest lap

=== Manufacturers' standings ===
1996 final manufacturers' standings
Pos.	Manufacturer	SMR (San Marino)		GBR (United Kingdom)		GER (Germany)		ITA (Italy)		CZE (Czech Republic)		USA (United States)		EUR (Europe)		INA (Indonesia)		JPN (Japan)		NED (Netherlands)		ESP (Spain)		AUS (Australia)		Pts
Pos.	Manufacturer	R1	R2	R1	R2	R1	R2	R1	R2	R1	R2	R1	R2	R1	R2	R1	R2	R1	R2	R1	R2	R1	R2	R1	R2	Pts
1	(Italy) Ducati	1	1	1	1	2	3	4	1	1	1	1	2	1	1	1	1	4	2	2	2	1	1	3	4	521
2	(Japan) Honda	6	5	5	2	1	1	1	2	2	2	5	3	5	5	2	2	1	1	1	1	5	6	4	2	430
3	(Japan) Kawasaki	4	4	2	3	4	4	9	10	10	9	7	1	2	4	11	11	9	6	8	8	4	4	1	1	308
4	(Japan) Yamaha	9	7	6	4	3	5	3	5	6	7	8	4	3	5	5	4	2	5	6	7	2	3	2	3	300
5	(Japan) Suzuki	17	12	13	14	10	9	8	8	5	8	10	13	7	8	9	6	12	10	13	9	7	9	5	8	156
Pos.	Manufacturer	SMR (San Marino)		GBR (United Kingdom)		GER (Germany)		ITA (Italy)		CZE (Czech Republic)		USA (United States)		EUR (Europe)		INA (Indonesia)		JPN (Japan)		NED (Netherlands)		ESP (Spain)		AUS (Australia)		Pts
