= 2001 Superbike World Championship =

2001 Superbike World Championship
Previous:	2000	Next:	2002
Support series: Supersport World Championship; Superstock European Championship

The 2001 Superbike World Championship was the fourteenth FIM Superbike World Championship season. The season started on 11 March at Valencia and finished on 30 September at Imola after 13 rounds.

Troy Bayliss won the riders' championship and Ducati won the manufacturers' championship.

== Race calendar and results ==
2001 Superbike World Championship Calendar
Round		Circuit	Date	Superpole	Fastest lap	Winning rider	Winning team	Report
1	R1	(Spain) Valencia	11 March	(Australia) Troy Corser	(Australia) Troy Corser	(Australia) Troy Corser	Aprilia Axo	Report
1	R2	(Spain) Valencia	11 March	(Australia) Troy Corser	(Australia) Troy Corser	(Australia) Troy Corser	Aprilia Axo	Report
2	R1	(South Africa) Kyalami	1 April	(United States) Ben Bostrom	(United States) Colin Edwards	(United States) Colin Edwards	Castrol Honda	Report
2	R2	(South Africa) Kyalami	1 April	(United States) Ben Bostrom	(United States) Ben Bostrom	(United States) Ben Bostrom	Ducati L&M	Report
3	R1	(Australia) Phillip Island	22 April	(Australia) Troy Corser	(Spain) Rubén Xaus	(United States) Colin Edwards	Castrol Honda	Report
3	R2	(Australia) Phillip Island	22 April	(Australia) Troy Corser	Cancelled due to rain			Report
4	R1	(Japan) Sugo	29 April	(Japan) Makoto Tamada	(Japan) Makoto Tamada	(Japan) Makoto Tamada	Cabin Honda	Report
4	R2	(Japan) Sugo	29 April	(Japan) Makoto Tamada	(Japan) Makoto Tamada	(Japan) Makoto Tamada	Cabin Honda	Report
5	R1	(Italy) Monza	13 May	(Australia) Troy Bayliss	(United States) Colin Edwards	(Australia) Troy Bayliss	Ducati Infostrada	Report
5	R2	(Italy) Monza	13 May	(Australia) Troy Bayliss	(Australia) Troy Bayliss	(Australia) Troy Bayliss	Ducati Infostrada	Report
6	R1	(United Kingdom) Donington Park	27 May	(United Kingdom) Steve Hislop	(United Kingdom) Steve Hislop	(United Kingdom) Neil Hodgson	GSE Ducati	Report
6	R2	(United Kingdom) Donington Park	27 May	(United Kingdom) Steve Hislop	(Italy) Pierfrancesco Chili	(Italy) Pierfrancesco Chili	Suzuki Alstare Corona	Report
7	R1	(Germany) Lausitzring	10 June	(United Kingdom) Neil Hodgson	(Australia) Troy Bayliss	(United States) Colin Edwards	Castrol Honda	Report
7	R2	(Germany) Lausitzring	10 June	(United Kingdom) Neil Hodgson	(Italy) Mauro Sanchini	(Australia) Troy Bayliss	Ducati Infostrada	Report
8	R1	(San Marino) Misano	24 June	(United Kingdom) Neil Hodgson	(Australia) Troy Bayliss	(Australia) Troy Bayliss	Ducati Infostrada	Report
8	R2	(San Marino) Misano	24 June	(United Kingdom) Neil Hodgson	(United Kingdom) Neil Hodgson	(United States) Ben Bostrom	Ducati L&M	Report
9	R1	(United States) Laguna Seca	8 July	(United States) Ben Bostrom	(Australia) Troy Corser	(United States) Ben Bostrom	Ducati L&M	Report
9	R2	(United States) Laguna Seca	8 July	(United States) Ben Bostrom	(United States) Ben Bostrom	(United States) Ben Bostrom	Ducati L&M	Report
10	R1	(Europe) Brands Hatch	29 July	(United Kingdom) Neil Hodgson	(Italy) Pierfrancesco Chili	(United States) Ben Bostrom	Ducati L&M	Report
10	R2	(Europe) Brands Hatch	29 July	(United Kingdom) Neil Hodgson	(United States) Ben Bostrom	(United States) Ben Bostrom	Ducati L&M	Report
11	R1	(Germany) Oschersleben	2 September	(United Kingdom) Neil Hodgson	(United States) Colin Edwards	(United States) Colin Edwards	Castrol Honda	Report
11	R2	(Germany) Oschersleben	2 September	(United Kingdom) Neil Hodgson	(Spain) Rubén Xaus	(Spain) Rubén Xaus	Ducati Infostrada	Report
12	R1	(Netherlands) Assen	9 September	(Australia) Troy Bayliss	(Spain) Rubén Xaus	(Australia) Troy Bayliss	Ducati Infostrada	Report
12	R2	(Netherlands) Assen	9 September	(Australia) Troy Bayliss	(Spain) Rubén Xaus	(Australia) Troy Bayliss	Ducati Infostrada	Report
13	R1	(Italy) Imola	30 September	(Australia) Troy Corser	(United States) Colin Edwards	(Spain) Rubén Xaus	Ducati Infostrada	Report
13	R2	(Italy) Imola	30 September	(Australia) Troy Corser	(Australia) Troy Corser	(France) Régis Laconi	Virgilio Aprilia Axo	Report

== Championship standings ==
=== Riders' standings ===
2001 final riders' standings
Pos.	Rider	Bike	ESP (Spain)		RSA (South Africa)		AUS (Australia)		JPN (Japan)		ITA (Italy)		GBR (United Kingdom)		GER (Germany)		SMR (San Marino)		USA (United States)		EUR (Europe)		GER (Germany)		NED (Netherlands)		ITA (Italy)		Pts
Pos.	Rider	Bike	R1	R2	R1	R2	R1	R2	R1	R2	R1	R2	R1	R2	R1	R2	R1	R2	R1	R2	R1	R2	R1	R2	R1	R2	R1	R2	Pts
1	(Australia) Troy Bayliss	Ducati	2	2	2	2	3	C	13	15	**1**	**1**	13	9	2	1	1	2	4	4	5	3	Ret	3	**1**	**1**	Ret	DNS	369
2	(United States) Colin Edwards	Honda	6	4	1	Ret	1	C	12	13	2	2	5	6	1	3	3	11	6	6	3	5	1	2	3	10	3	Ret	333
3	(United States) Ben Bostrom	Ducati	3	Ret	**4**	**1**	Ret	C	9	4	Ret	DNS	6	4	11	20	2	1	**1**	**1**	1	1	3	4	11	11	4	4	312
4	(Australia) Troy Corser	Aprilia	**1**	**1**	3	3	**6**	**C**	2	6	Ret	Ret	11	3	5	7	7	9	3	2	8	13	9	11	6	3	**2**	**Ret**	284
5	(United Kingdom) Neil Hodgson	Ducati	Ret	5	Ret	4	11	C	7	5	Ret	7	1	2	**8**	**2**	**6**	**16**	2	3	**2**	**2**	**7**	**10**	5	5	10	7	269
6	(Spain) Rubén Xaus	Ducati	Ret	8	9	5	Ret	C	18	22	Ret	6	7	10	19	6	10	6	7	10	6	12	2	1	2	2	1	2	236
7	(Italy) Pierfrancesco Chili	Suzuki	7	7	6	8	7	C	8	8	14	5	2	1	4	5	12	10	Ret	Ret	4	4	6	6	4	4	Ret	9	232
8	(Japan) Tadayuki Okada	Honda	Ret	Ret	Ret	Ret	2	C	20	12	Ret	4	4	7	3	9	9	5	8	11	12	15	5	8	7	13	5	3	176
9	(Japan) Akira Yanagawa	Kawasaki	8	6	5	Ret	4	C	Ret	11	3	3	14	8	12	10	5	Ret	Ret	8	10	8	4	9	8	6	DNS	DNS	170
10	(Spain) Gregorio Lavilla	Kawasaki	5	3	7	7	Ret	C	6	19	4	Ret	10	13	6	16	4	3	12	Ret	Ret	14	11	7	12	9	7	6	166
11	(France) Régis Laconi	Aprilia	4	Ret	8	6	Ret	C	14	14	5	8	12	11	7	13	Ret	Ret	11	9	Ret	11	8	5	9	7	Ret	1	152
12	(France) Stéphane Chambon	Suzuki	10	10	10	10	8	C	15	18	6	9	9	12	10	8	14	13	Ret	12	7	9	12	13	13	12	8	Ret	122
13	(United Kingdom) James Toseland	Ducati	Ret	9	14	Ret	14	C	11	16	Ret	Ret	8	Ret	Ret	17	11	8	10	7	11	6	10	12	10	8	Ret	DNS	91
14	(Japan) Hitoyasu Izutsu	Kawasaki	9	Ret			Ret	C	3	2					9	4									24	16			63
15	(Japan) Makoto Tamada	Honda							**1**	**1**																			50
16	(Australia) Broc Parkes	Ducati	Ret	13	12	11	5	C	16	17	DNS	DNS	20	14	14	Ret	Ret	7	13	14	Ret	DNS	Ret	18	22	Ret	Ret	8	49
17	(Australia) Steve Martin	Ducati	11	Ret	19	17	12	C	19	20	Ret	14	17	18	15	14	13	Ret	14	13	14	18	Ret	14	20	20	6	5	47
18	(Italy) Giovanni Bussei	Ducati	Ret	Ret	11	9	Ret	C	Ret	21	8	11	Ret	15	Ret	Ret	Ret	14	15	Ret	17	Ret	14	Ret	16	14	11	10	44
19	(Italy) Lucio Pedercini	Ducati	12	15	16	14	Ret	C	21	Ret	7	13	18	Ret	Ret	Ret	Ret	Ret	16	Ret	Ret	Ret	Ret	16	15	15	9	12	32
20	(Austria) Robert Ulm	Ducati	DSQ	12	13	12	9	C	17	Ret	Ret	12	Ret	19	Ret	11	Ret	Ret	17	16	Ret	19	Ret	15					28
20	(Austria) Robert Ulm	Kawasaki																							NC	21	Ret	18	28
21	(United States) Eric Bostrom	Kawasaki																	5	5									22
22	(Italy) Alessandro Antonello	Aprilia									Ret	Ret					8	4									Ret	Ret	21
23	(Italy) Alessandro Gramigni	Yamaha									12	10					15	12									15	11	21
24	(Japan) Shinichi Ito	Honda							4	9																			20
25	(United Kingdom) John Reynolds	Ducati											Ret	5							Ret	7							20
26	(Japan) Akira Ryo	Suzuki							5	7																			20
27	(Italy) Marco Borciani	Ducati	13	11	15	Ret	Ret	C	22	23	10	Ret	Ret	Ret	20	Ret	17	Ret	20	17	15	17	Ret	Ret	21	18	Ret	15	17
28	(United Kingdom) Steve Hislop	Ducati											**3**	**Ret**							Ret	Ret							16
29	(Japan) Tamaki Serizawa	Kawasaki							Ret	3																			16
30	(Italy) Mauro Sanchini	Ducati	Ret	17	20	16	Ret	C	27	26	9	15	19	Ret	17	12	Ret	15	19	18	16	Ret	17	19	19	17	13	16	16
31	(Australia) Martin Craggill	Ducati	18	22	21	Ret	10	C	26	28	Ret	Ret	15	16	13	Ret	19	Ret	Ret	19	19	Ret	Ret	Ret	18	Ret	12	14	16
32	(United Kingdom) Sean Emmett	Ducati																			9	10							13
33	(Spain) Juan Borja	Yamaha	14	14	Ret	DNS	Ret	C	24	25	13	16	16	17	Ret	18	21	19			20	Ret	13	Ret	14	Ret	Ret	Ret	12
34	(France) Bertrand Stey	Honda	Ret	19	17	15	Ret	C	23	24	11	Ret	Ret	21	16	15	16	18	21	20	18	20	15	20	Ret	22	16	17	8
35	(United States) Doug Chandler	Kawasaki																	9	Ret									7
36	(Australia) Peter Goddard	Benelli															Ret	Ret	18	15	13	16	16	17	17	19	Ret	13	7
37	(Japan) Yukio Kagayama	Suzuki							Ret	10																			6
38	(Japan) Wataru Yoshikawa	Yamaha							10	Ret																			6
39	(Australia) Alistair Maxwell	Kawasaki					13	C																					3
40	(Italy) Michele Malatesta	Kawasaki	Ret	Ret	18	13	Ret	C	25	Ret	Ret	Ret	Ret	20	18	21	18	Ret	DNS	DNS			Ret	Ret					3
41	(Italy) Paolo Blora	Ducati									Ret	Ret					Ret	17									14	Ret	2
42	(France) Ludovic Holon	Kawasaki	Ret	Ret	22	Ret	DNS	C	NC	27	15	17	21	22	22	22	Ret	DNS											1
43	(Czech Republic) Jiří Mrkývka	Ducati	17	20	24	Ret	15	C			Ret	Ret	Ret	Ret	Ret	Ret	Ret	20	Ret	21			Ret	Ret	DNQ	DNQ	Ret	Ret	1
44	(Spain) Javier Rodríguez	Honda	15	16	23	Ret											22	Ret	Ret	22	Ret	Ret			DNQ	DNQ	DNQ	DNQ	1
Pos.	Rider	Bike	ESP (Spain)		RSA (South Africa)		AUS (Australia)		JPN (Japan)		ITA (Italy)		GBR (United Kingdom)		GER (Germany)		SMR (San Marino)		USA (United States)		EUR (Europe)		GER (Germany)		NED (Netherlands)		ITA (Italy)		Pts

Colour	Result
Gold	Winner
Silver	Second place
Bronze	Third place
Green	Points classification
Blue	Non-points classification
Blue	Non-classified finish (NC)
Purple	Retired, not classified (Ret)
Red	Did not qualify (DNQ)
Red	Did not pre-qualify (DNPQ)
Black	Disqualified (DSQ)
White	Did not start (DNS)
White	Withdrew (WD)
White	Race cancelled (C)
Blank	Did not practice (DNP)
Blank	Did not arrive (DNA)
Blank	Excluded (EX)

**Bold** – Pole position
Italics – Fastest lap

=== Manufacturers' standings ===
2001 final manufacturers' standings
Pos.	Manufacturer	ESP (Spain)		RSA (South Africa)		AUS (Australia)		JPN (Japan)		ITA (Italy)		GBR (United Kingdom)		GER (Germany)		SMR (San Marino)		USA (United States)		EUR (Europe)		GER (Germany)		NED (Netherlands)		ITA (Italy)		Pts
Pos.	Manufacturer	R1	R2	R1	R2	R1	R2	R1	R2	R1	R2	R1	R2	R1	R2	R1	R2	R1	R2	R1	R2	R1	R2	R1	R2	R1	R2	Pts
1	(Italy) Ducati	2	2	2	1	3	C	7	4	1	1	1	2	2	1	1	1	1	1	1	1	2	1	1	1	1	2	553
2	(Japan) Honda	6	4	1	15	1	C	1	1	2	2	4	6	1	3	3	5	6	6	3	5	1	2	3	10	3	3	401
3	(Italy) Aprilia	1	1	3	3	6	C	2	6	5	8	11	3	5	7	7	4	3	2	8	11	8	5	6	3	2	1	343
4	(Japan) Kawasaki	5	3	5	7	4	C	3	2	3	3	10	8	6	4	4	3	5	5	10	8	4	7	8	6	7	6	289
5	(Japan) Suzuki	7	7	6	8	7	C	5	7	6	5	2	1	4	5	12	10	Ret	12	4	4	6	6	4	4	8	9	256
6	(Japan) Yamaha	14	14	Ret	DNS	Ret	C	10	25	12	10	16	17	Ret	18	15	12			20	Ret	13	21	14	Ret	15	11	36
7	(Italy) Benelli															Ret	Ret	18	15	13	16	16	17	17	19	Ret	13	7
Pos.	Manufacturer	ESP (Spain)		RSA (South Africa)		AUS (Australia)		JPN (Japan)		ITA (Italy)		GBR (United Kingdom)		GER (Germany)		SMR (San Marino)		USA (United States)		EUR (Europe)		GER (Germany)		NED (Netherlands)		ITA (Italy)		Pts

== Entry list ==
2001 entry list
Team	Constructor	Motorcycle	No	Rider	Rounds
Castrol Honda	Honda	Honda VTR 1000 SP	1	(United States) Colin Edwards	1–13
Castrol Honda	Honda	Honda VTR 1000 SP	8	(Japan) Tadayuki Okada	1–13
Virgilio Aprilia Axo	Aprilia	Aprilia RSV 1000	3	(Australia) Troy Corser	1–13
Virgilio Aprilia Axo	Aprilia	Aprilia RSV 1000	30	(Italy) Alessandro Antonello	5, 8, 13
Virgilio Aprilia Axo	Aprilia	Aprilia RSV 1000	55	(France) Régis Laconi	1–13
Suzuki Alstare Corona	Suzuki	Suzuki GSX-R750	4	(Italy) Pierfrancesco Chili	1–13
Suzuki Alstare Corona	Suzuki	Suzuki GSX-R750	24	(France) Stéphane Chambon	1–13
Fuchs Kawasaki	Kawasaki	Kawasaki ZX-7RR	5	(Japan) Akira Yanagawa	1–13
Fuchs Kawasaki	Kawasaki	Kawasaki ZX-7RR	6	(Spain) Gregorio Lavilla	1–13
Fuchs Kawasaki	Kawasaki	Kawasaki ZX-7RR	19	(Japan) Hitoyasu Izutsu	1, 3–4, 7, 12
Panavto Yamaha	Yamaha	Yamaha R7	7	(Spain) Juan Borja	1–8, 10–13
Kawasaki Motors C.	Kawasaki	Kawasaki ZX-7RR	10	(United States) Doug Chandler	9
Kawasaki Motors C.	Kawasaki	Kawasaki ZX-7RR	32	(United States) Eric Bostrom	9
Ducati Infostrada	Ducati	Ducati 996 R	11	(Spain) Rubén Xaus	1–13
Ducati Infostrada	Ducati	Ducati 996 R	21	(Australia) Troy Bayliss	1–13
Benelli Sport	Benelli	Benelli Tornado 900	14	(Australia) Peter Goddard	8–13
Pedercini	Ducati	Ducati 996 RS	20	(Italy) Marco Borciani	1–13
Pedercini	Ducati	Ducati 996 RS	22	(Italy) Lucio Pedercini	1–13
Pedercini	Ducati	Ducati 996 RS	46	(Italy) Mauro Sanchini	1–13
JM SBK	Ducati	Ducati 996 RS	23	(Czech Republic) Jiří Mrkývka	1–9, 11–13
Ghelfi Art	Honda	Honda VTR 1000 RC	25	(Spain) Javier Rodríguez	1–2, 8–10, 12–13
Ghelfi Art	Honda	Honda VTR 1000 RC	26	(Australia) Warwick Nowland	3
Ghelfi Art	Honda	Honda VTR 1000 RC	29	(Japan) Arai Shuja	5
Ghelfi Art	Honda	Honda VTR 1000 RC	92	(Australia) Nigel Arnold	6
White Endurance	Honda	Honda SP	27	(France) Bertrand Stey	1–13
Kawasaki Bertocchi	Kawasaki	Kawasaki ZX-7RR	31	(Italy) Michele Malatesta	1–9, 11
Kawasaki Bertocchi	Kawasaki	Kawasaki ZX-7RR	33	(Austria) Robert Ulm	12–13
Kawasaki Bertocchi	Kawasaki	Kawasaki ZX-7RR	41	(France) Ludovic Holon	1–8
Kawasaki Bertocchi	Kawasaki	Kawasaki ZX-7RR	69	(Italy) Ferdinando Di Maso	9–13
Kawasaki Bertocchi	Kawasaki	Kawasaki ZX-7RR	82	(Italy) Luca Pedersoli	13
Kawasaki Bertocchi	Kawasaki	Kawasaki ZX-7RR	96	(Australia) Kim Ashkenazi	10
Gerin WSBK	Ducati	Ducati 996 RS	33	(Austria) Robert Ulm	1–11
Albatech Giesse	Ducati	Ducati 996 RS	34	(Italy) Giuliano Sartoni	1, 8
Ducati NCR	Ducati	Ducati 996 RS	35	(Italy) Giovanni Bussei	1–13
Ducati NCR	Ducati	Ducati 996 RS	36	(Australia) Broc Parkes	1–13
FP Racing	Ducati	Ducati 996 RS	37	(France) Frédéric Protat	1, 7
FP Racing	Ducati	Ducati 996 RS	39	(France) Thierry Mulot	1, 7
Remus R.Austria	Kawasaki	Kawasaki ZX-7RR	38	(Austria) Johann Wolfsteiner	1, 7
Valli Moto 391	Yamaha	Yamaha R7	39	(Italy) Alessandro Gramigni	5, 8, 13
	Kawasaki	Kawasaki ZX-7RR	40	(Australia) Scott Webster	3
Light Paths Warren & Brown	Suzuki	Suzuki GSX-R750	42	(Australia) Jay Normoyle	3
Sean McKay Racing	Kawasaki	Kawasaki ZX-7RR	43	(Australia) Sean McKay	3
Wallis Racing	Ducati	Ducati 996 R	44	(Australia) Roger Wallis	3
SRT Almax	Kawasaki	Kawasaki ZX-7RR	45	(Australia) Alistair Maxwell	3–4
Suzuki	Suzuki	Suzuki GSX-R750	48	(Japan) Akira Ryō	4
Suzuki	Suzuki	Suzuki GSX-R750	56	(Japan) Yukio Kagayama	4
Cabin Honda	Honda	Honda VTR 1000 SP	49	(Japan) Makoto Tamada	4
Cabin Honda	Honda	Honda VTR 1000 SP	50	(Japan) Shinichi Ito	4
Pacific	Ducati	Ducati 996 RS	51	(Australia) Martin Craggill	1–13
GSE Racing	Ducati	Ducati 996 RS	52	(United Kingdom) James Toseland	1–13
GSE Racing	Ducati	Ducati 996 RS	100	(United Kingdom) Neil Hodgson	1–13
Yamaha Racing	Yamaha	Yamaha R7	53	(Japan) Wataru Yoshikawa	4
Kawasaki Racing	Kawasaki	Kawasaki ZX-7RR	54	(Japan) Tamaki Serizawa	4
World Bike Racing	Ducati	Ducati 996 R	57	(Italy) Serafino Foti	5, 13
GiBi	Ducati	Ducati 996 R	58	(Italy) Luca Pasini	5, 8, 13
Reve Red Bull Ducati	Ducati	Ducati 996 R	60	(United Kingdom) John Reynolds	6, 10
Reve Red Bull Ducati	Ducati	Ducati 996 R	62	(United Kingdom) Sean Emmett	10
Monster Mob Ducati	Ducati	Ducati 996 R	61	(United Kingdom) Steve Hislop	6, 10
ALG Racing	Suzuki	Suzuki GSX-R750	67	(Germany) Peter Preussler	7
JTR Corse Racing	Ducati	Ducati 996 R	68	(Czech Republic) Jiří Trčka	8
Virgin Mobil Aiwa Yamaha	Yamaha	Yamaha R7	70	(United Kingdom) James Haydon	10
DB Racing	Honda	Honda VTR 1000 RC	74	(United Kingdom) Dean Ellison	10
Inothem Racing	Yamaha	Yamaha R7	75	(Slovenia) Berto Camlek	11
Yamaha Norway	Yamaha	Yamaha R7	76	(Norway) Oddgeir Havnen	11
Stichting Wegrace P.	Suzuki	Suzuki GSX-R750	77	(Netherlands) Robert van de Molen	12
Gilex Racing Amsterdam	Ducati	Ducati 996 R	78	(Netherlands) Lex van Dijk	12
Polskamp bv-Ermelo	Suzuki	Suzuki GSX-R750	79	(Netherlands) Henri Minnen	12
Symittech-Hengelo	Suzuki	Suzuki GSX-R750	80	(Netherlands) Richard Fluttert	12
DCR	Ducati	Ducati 996 R	86	(Italy) Matteo Campana	7–8
DCR	Ducati	Ducati 996 R	113	(Italy) Paolo Blora	5, 8, 13
DFX Racing	Ducati	Ducati 996 RS	99	(Australia) Steve Martin	1–13
Ducati L&M	Ducati	Ducati 996 R	155	(United States) Ben Bostrom	1–13

Key
Regular rider
Wildcard rider
Replacement rider
