= 1997 Superbike World Championship =

1997 Superbike World Championship
Previous:	1996	Next:	1998
Support series: Supersport World Series

The 1997 Superbike World Championship was the tenth FIM Superbike World Championship season. The season started on 23 March at Phillip Island and finished on 12 October at Sentul after 12 rounds.

John Kocinski won the riders' championship with 9 victories and Honda won the manufacturers' championship.

== Race calendar and results ==
1997 Superbike World Championship Calendar
Round		Circuit	Date	Pole position	Fastest lap	Winning rider	Winning team	Report
1	R1	(Australia) Phillip Island	23 March	(New Zealand) Aaron Slight	(United States) John Kocinski	(United States) John Kocinski	Castrol Honda	Report
1	R2	(Australia) Phillip Island	23 March	(New Zealand) Aaron Slight	(United States) Colin Edwards	(New Zealand) Aaron Slight	Castrol Honda	Report
2	R1	(San Marino) Misano	20 April	(Japan) Akira Yanagawa	(Italy) Pierfrancesco Chili	(Italy) Pierfrancesco Chili	Gattolone Racing	Report
2	R2	(San Marino) Misano	20 April	(Japan) Akira Yanagawa	(United States) John Kocinski	(United States) John Kocinski	Castrol Honda	Report
3	R1	(United Kingdom) Donington	4 May	(United Kingdom) Neil Hodgson	(Italy) Pierfrancesco Chili	(New Zealand) Aaron Slight	Castrol Honda	Report
3	R2	(United Kingdom) Donington	4 May	(United Kingdom) Neil Hodgson	(United Kingdom) Carl Fogarty	(United Kingdom) Carl Fogarty	Ducati Corse ADVF	Report
4	R1	(Germany) Hockenheim	8 June	(New Zealand) Simon Crafar	(United States) John Kocinski	(New Zealand) Aaron Slight	Castrol Honda	Report
4	R2	(Germany) Hockenheim	8 June	(New Zealand) Simon Crafar	(United Kingdom) Carl Fogarty	(United Kingdom) Carl Fogarty	Ducati Corse ADVF	Report
5	R1	(Italy) Monza	22 June	(United States) Scott Russell	(New Zealand) Aaron Slight	(United States) John Kocinski	Castrol Honda	Report
5	R2	(Italy) Monza	22 June	(United States) Scott Russell	(Italy) Pierfrancesco Chili	(Italy) Pierfrancesco Chili	Gattolone Racing	Report
6	R1	(United States) Laguna Seca	13 July	(Italy) Pierfrancesco Chili	(United Kingdom) Carl Fogarty	(United States) John Kocinski	Castrol Honda	Report
6	R2	(United States) Laguna Seca	13 July	(Italy) Pierfrancesco Chili	(United States) John Kocinski	(United States) John Kocinski	Castrol Honda	Report
7	R1	(Europe) Brands Hatch	3 August	(Italy) Pierfrancesco Chili	(United Kingdom) Niall Mackenzie	(Italy) Pierfrancesco Chili	Gattolone Racing	Report
7	R2	(Europe) Brands Hatch	3 August	(Italy) Pierfrancesco Chili	(United Kingdom) Carl Fogarty	(United Kingdom) Carl Fogarty	Ducati Corse ADVF	Report
8	R1	(Austria) A1-Ring	17 August	(Italy) Pierfrancesco Chili	(Japan) Akira Yanagawa	(United Kingdom) Carl Fogarty	Ducati Corse ADVF	Report
8	R2	(Austria) A1-Ring	17 August	(Italy) Pierfrancesco Chili	(Japan) Akira Yanagawa	(Japan) Akira Yanagawa	Kawasaki Racing	Report
9	R1	(Netherlands) Assen	31 August	(United States) John Kocinski	(Italy) Pierfrancesco Chili	(United States) John Kocinski	Castrol Honda	Report
9	R2	(Netherlands) Assen	31 August	(United States) John Kocinski	(Italy) Pierfrancesco Chili	(United Kingdom) Carl Fogarty	Ducati Corse ADVF	Report
10	R1	(Spain) Albacete	21 September	(United States) John Kocinski	(United States) John Kocinski	(United States) John Kocinski	Castrol Honda	Report
10	R2	(Spain) Albacete	21 September	(United States) John Kocinski	(New Zealand) Simon Crafar	(United States) John Kocinski	Castrol Honda	Report
11	R1	(Japan) Sugo	5 October	(Japan) Akira Yanagawa	(Japan) Akira Yanagawa	(Japan) Akira Yanagawa	Kawasaki Racing	Report
11	R2	(Japan) Sugo	5 October	(Japan) Akira Yanagawa	(Japan) Noriyuki Haga	(Japan) Noriyuki Haga	Yamaha World Superbike	Report
12	R1	(Indonesia) Sentul	12 October	(United States) John Kocinski	(United States) John Kocinski	(United States) John Kocinski	Castrol Honda	Report
12	R2	(Indonesia) Sentul	12 October	(United States) John Kocinski	(United States) John Kocinski	(United Kingdom) Carl Fogarty	Ducati Corse ADVF	Report

== Championship standings ==
=== Riders' standings ===
Riders entered into the European Superbike Championship—who scored points towards a separate championship— were not eligible to score World Championship points.

1997 final riders' standings
Pos	Rider	Bike	AUS (Australia)		SMR (San Marino)		GBR (United Kingdom)		GER (Germany)		ITA (Italy)		USA (United States)		EUR (Europe)		AUT (Austria)		NED (Netherlands)		ESP (Spain)		JPN (Japan)		INA (Indonesia)		Pts
Pos	Rider	Bike	R1	R2	R1	R2	R1	R2	R1	R2	R1	R2	R1	R2	R1	R2	R1	R2	R1	R2	R1	R2	R1	R2	R1	R2	Pts
1	(United States) John Kocinski	Honda	1	7	2	1	10	5	2	14	1	2	1	1	3	2	5	3	**1**	**3**	**1**	**1**	9	3	**1**	**Ret**	416
2	(United Kingdom) Carl Fogarty	Ducati	2	4	3	3	2	1	4	1	3	4	2	2	Ret	1	1	Ret	2	1	Ret	Ret	13	Ret	3	1	358
3	(New Zealand) Aaron Slight	Honda	**Ret**	**1**	4	2	1	3	1	Ret	2	5	7	10	6	8	3	2	4	4	2	3	6	4	2	4	343
4	(Japan) Akira Yanagawa	Kawasaki	4	Ret	**Ret**	**5**	DNS	DNS	8	2	8	Ret	10	5	5	4	2	1	8	7	4	4	**1**	**Ret**	4	2	247
5	(New Zealand) Simon Crafar	Kawasaki	3	3	5	7	3	4	**Ret**	**6**	4	7	4	Ret	Ret	7	6	Ret	9	6	3	2	3	2	Ret	Ret	234
6	(United States) Scott Russell	Yamaha	7	6	Ret	6	6	7	3	4	**5**	**8**	6	4	2	5	7	4	6	8	Ret	5	14	Ret	6	5	226
7	(Italy) Pierfrancesco Chili	Ducati	Ret	DNS	1	Ret	Ret	2	5	7	7	1	**Ret**	**6**	**1**	**Ret**	**4**	**Ret**	3	2	5	7	12	Ret	Ret	Ret	209
8	(United Kingdom) James Whitham	Suzuki	Ret	11	Ret	Ret	8	10	14	3	6	3	8	Ret	7	9	10	6	7	11	Ret	10	DNS	DNS	9	6	140
9	(United Kingdom) Neil Hodgson	Ducati	Ret	Ret	7	4	**4**	**9**	6	8			Ret	9	4	6	8	Ret	5	5	Ret	8	18	Ret	Ret	7	137
10	(Italy) Piergiorgio Bontempi	Kawasaki	Ret	10	8	Ret	11	Ret	11	11	9	6	9	7	8	12	9	5	Ret	10	6	6	Ret	Ret	DNS	DNS	118
11	(United States) Mike Hale	Suzuki	Ret	Ret	Ret	12	15	Ret	9	Ret	10	9	14	Ret	9	11	11	7	11	Ret	8	9	21	10	8	Ret	87
12	(United States) Colin Edwards	Yamaha	Ret	2	6	8	5	6	7	5	DNS	DNS	WD	WD													79
13	(Japan) Noriyuki Haga	Yamaha																					2	1	5	3	72
14	(Spain) Pere Riba	Honda	10	17	9	9	18	15	NC	22	18	11			13	13	16	12	12	15	11	13	23	15	11	11	69
15	(Slovenia) Igor Jerman	Kawasaki	12	Ret	13	Ret	20	17	16	16	15	16	15	13	Ret	15	17	13	16	14	13	20	28	14	10	9	50
16	(United Kingdom) Chris Walker	Yamaha													10	10	12	10	10	9	10	11					47
17	(Germany) Jochen Schmid	Kawasaki							13	9	13	10					14	11	13	12	9	12					46
18	(Austria) Andreas Meklau	Ducati	8	15			17	14	10	10	11	Ret	DNS	DNS			15	8									40
19	(Canada) Miguel Duhamel	Honda											3	3													32
20	(Australia) Troy Bayliss	Suzuki	5	5																							22
21	(United Kingdom) Michael Rutter	Honda													11	3											21
22	(United Kingdom) John Reynolds	Ducati					9	11															19	Ret	7	Ret	21
23	(United Kingdom) Sean Emmett	Ducati					14	12							Ret	Ret							20	9	Ret	8	21
24	(Japan) Katsuaki Fujiwara	Suzuki																					8	5			20
25	(United Kingdom) James Haydon	Ducati	Ret	14	Ret	11	16	DSQ	DNS	Ret	12	13	Ret	Ret	Ret	Ret	Ret	Ret	Ret	Ret	Ret	15					19
26	(Spain) Gregorio Lavilla	Ducati					13	13	DNS	13							Ret	Ret			7	Ret					18
27	(Japan) Tamaki Serizawa	Suzuki																					10	6			17
28	(Australia) Martin Craggill	Kawasaki	6	9																							17
29	(United Kingdom) Niall Mackenzie	Yamaha					7	8							DSQ	Ret											17
30	(France) Christian Lavielle	Honda			10	10	19	16	17	Ret															Ret	12	16
31	(Japan) Makoto Suzuki	Ducati																					25	11	12	10	15
32	(Japan) Keiichi Kitagawa	Suzuki																					4	Ret			13
33	(United States) Tom Kipp	Yamaha											12	8													12
34	(Sweden) Christer Lindholm	Yamaha					12	Ret	12	12																	12
35	(United States) Doug Chandler	Kawasaki											5	Ret													11
36	(Japan) Yuichi Takeda	Honda																					16	7			11
37	(Japan) Shinya Takeishi	Kawasaki																					7	Ret			10
38	(Japan) Akira Ryō	Kawasaki																					17	8			9
39	(Canada) Steve Crevier	Honda											11	12													9
40	(Australia) Damon Buckmaster	Kawasaki	Ret	8																							8
41	(Finland) Erkka Korpiaho	Kawasaki																	15	17	18	16					7
42	(Indonesia) Simon Yudha Kusuma	Kawasaki																							13	13	6
43	(United States) Aaron Yates	Suzuki											Ret	11													5
44	(Australia) Benn Archibald	Kawasaki	13	Ret																							5
45	(United Kingdom) Phil Giles	Kawasaki													15	14											5
46	(Japan) Norihiko Fujiwara	Yamaha																					15	Ret			3
47	(Austria) Christian Häusle	Ducati															Ret	16									3
48	(Canada) Pascal Picotte	Suzuki											13	Ret													3
49	(France) Jean-Marc Delétang	Yamaha									16	14															3
50	(Austria) Johann Wolfsteiner	Kawasaki															NC	19									2
51	(France) Jean-Philippe Ruggia	Yamaha									14	Ret															2
52	(Austria) Ossi Niederkircher	Suzuki															22	22									1
53	(Australia) David Emmerson	Suzuki	Ret	18																							1
Riders not eligible to score points, with at least a top-15 finish
	(Japan) Wataru Yoshikawa	Yamaha																					5	Ret			0
	(Australia) Shawn Giles	Honda	9	10																							0
	(Germany) Udo Mark	Suzuki							15	15	17	12					13	9	14	13	12	14					0
	(Italy) Giorgio Cantalupo	Ducati			11	13	Ret	19	21	20	20	15			17	22	19	17	23	Ret	14	17					0
	(Australia) Jason Love	Ducati	11	16																							0
	(Japan) Shinichi Ito	Honda																					11	Ret			0
	(Australia) Craig Connell	Ducati	Ret	11																							0
	(United Kingdom) Ray Stringer	Kawasaki													12	16											0
	(Italy) Redamo Assirelli	Yamaha			12	17					21	21					Ret	Ret									0
	(Japan) Ichiro Asai	Ducati																					24	12			0
	(Japan) Manabu Kamada	Honda																					22	13			0
	(Czech Republic) Jiří Mrkývka	Honda			14	15	22	21	DNQ	DNQ	DNQ	DNQ			19	21	25	18	Ret	20	15	18					0
	(Italy) Bruno Scatola	Kawasaki			15	14					Ret	DNS															0
	(Germany) Anton Gruschka	Yamaha			Ret	Ret	21	18	18	17	19	18			Ret	19	18	14	20	Ret	16	19					0
	(United States) Mike Krynock	Suzuki											16	14													0
	(United Kingdom) Brett Sampson	Kawasaki					Ret	Ret							14	Ret											0
	(Australia) Greg Moss	Honda	14	Ret																							0
	(Austria) Gerhard Esterer	Kawasaki			16	DNS			20	19	24	19					20	15									0
	(Australia) Craig Stafford	Yamaha	15	19																							0
Riders not eligible to finish and to start the race
	(Indonesia) Joenzindy Gozali	Kawasaki																							Ret	Ret	0
	(Indonesia) Affandi Bar	Kawasaki																							DNQ	DNQ	0
	(Indonesia) Jimmy Tanujaya	Kawasaki																							DNQ	DNQ	0
Pos.	Rider	Bike	AUS (Australia)		SMR (San Marino)		GBR (United Kingdom)		GER (Germany)		ITA (Italy)		USA (United States)		EUR (Europe)		AUT (Austria)		NED (Netherlands)		ESP (Spain)		JPN (Japan)		INA (Indonesia)		Pts

Colour	Result
Gold	Winner
Silver	Second place
Bronze	Third place
Green	Points classification
Blue	Non-points classification
Blue	Non-classified finish (NC)
Purple	Retired, not classified (Ret)
Red	Did not qualify (DNQ)
Red	Did not pre-qualify (DNPQ)
Black	Disqualified (DSQ)
White	Did not start (DNS)
White	Withdrew (WD)
White	Race cancelled (C)
Blank	Did not practice (DNP)
Blank	Did not arrive (DNA)
Blank	Excluded (EX)

**Bold** – Pole position
Italics – Fastest lap

=== Manufacturers' standings ===
1997 final manufacturers' standings
Pos.	Manufacturer	AUS (Australia)		SMR (San Marino)		GBR (United Kingdom)		GER (Germany)		ITA (Italy)		USA (United States)		EUR (Europe)		AUT (Austria)		NED (Netherlands)		ESP (Spain)		JPN (Japan)		INA (Indonesia)		Pts
Pos.	Manufacturer	R1	R2	R1	R2	R1	R2	R1	R2	R1	R2	R1	R2	R1	R2	R1	R2	R1	R2	R1	R2	R1	R2	R1	R2	Pts
1	(Japan) Honda	1	1	2	1	1	3	1	14	1	2	1	1	3	2	3	2	1	3	1	1	6	3	1	4	486
2	(Italy) Ducati	2	4	1	3	2	1	4	1	3	1	2	2	1	1	1	8	2	1	5	7	11	9	3	1	440
3	(Japan) Kawasaki	3	3	5	5	3	4	8	2	4	6	4	5	5	4	2	1	8	6	3	2	1	2	4	2	359
4	(Japan) Yamaha	7	2	6	6	5	6	3	4	5	8	6	4	2	5	7	4	6	8	10	5	2	1	5	3	301
5	(Japan) Suzuki	5	5	Ret	12	8	10	9	3	6	3	8	11	7	9	10	6	7	11	8	9	4	5	8	6	205
Pos.	Manufacturer	AUS (Australia)		SMR (San Marino)		GBR (United Kingdom)		GER (Germany)		ITA (Italy)		USA (United States)		EUR (Europe)		AUT (Austria)		NED (Netherlands)		ESP (Spain)		JPN (Japan)		INA (Indonesia)		Pts
