= Noriyuki Haga =

Japanese motorcycle racer

- Haga at Assen in 2007
- Nationality: Japanese
- Born: March 2, 1975 (age 51); Atsuta-ku, Nagoya, Japan
- Current team: Team Kagayama
- Bike number: 41
- Website: nitro-nori41.com
Motorcycle racing career statistics
Grand Prix motorcycle racing
Active years	1998, 2001, 2003
First race	1998 500cc Japanese Grand Prix
Last race	2003 MotoGP Valencia Grand Prix
Team(s)	Yamaha, Aprilia
Championships	0
2003 championship position	14th (47 pts)
Starts / Wins / Podiums / Poles / F. laps / Points; 32 / 0 / 1 / 0 / 1 / 122
Superbike World Championship
Active years	1994–2000, 2002, 2004–2011, 2013
Manufacturers	Ducati, Yamaha, Aprilia, BMW
Championships	0
2013 championship position	41st (2 pts)
Starts / Wins / Podiums / Poles / F. laps / Points; 312 / 43 / 116 / 7 / 59 / 3691
British Superbike Championship
Active years	2012–2013
Manufacturers	Yamaha, Kawasaki
Championships	0
2013 championship position	23rd (8 pts)
Starts / Wins / Podiums / Poles / F. laps / Points; 26 / 0 / 1 / 0 / 0 / 171

Noriyuki Haga (芳賀 紀行, Haga Noriyuki; born 2 March 1975 in Atsuta-ku, Nagoya) is a Japanese former professional motorcycle racer. He won 43 world championship superbike races during a 25-year racing career, making him one of the most accomplished competitors never to have won a Superbike World Championship. Haga was the runner-up in the championship three times and, four times finished in third place. His 43 victories rank him sixth all time in the history of the Superbike World Championship behind Jonathan Rea, Álvaro Bautista, Toprak Razgatlıoğlu, Carl Fogarty and Troy Bayliss. Haga ranks fourth behind Troy Corser, Tom Sykes and Jonathan Rea in career World Superbike race starts with 313. He last competed in the 2018 CIV Supersport 600 Championship, aboard a Yamaha YZF-R6.

== Career ==
=== Early career ===
Haga started his racing career by competing in the Japanese Superbike Championship in 1993, riding a Ducati bike. He then moved to Yamaha in 1995, and won the championship with Yamaha in 1997. During his stint with Yamaha in Japanese Superbike, Haga was chosen to represent Yamaha in the 1996 Suzuka 8 Hours endurance race. He teamed up with Yamaha's World Superbike rider Colin Edwards and won the race.

=== Superbike World Championship ===
Before Haga began racing full-time in the World Superbike Championship in 1998, he had already been racing occasionally in WSBK since 1994. In 1996, Haga received a wild card entry to race in the Japanese round of WSBK at Sugo. He surprisingly finished second in Race 1, collecting his first podium in WSBK at his first attempt. However, he failed to finish in Race 2. In 1997, while still racing in his home championship, he was given another chance to race in WSBK. He was chosen to replace the injured Colin Edwards for the last two races of the season in Sugo, Japan, and Sentul, Indonesia. He performed well in both rounds, collecting his first win in WSBK along with two more podiums.

In 1998, Haga began racing WSBK full-time. He also adopted the number 41 that he has used ever since. Haga joined Yamaha's Superbike team, replacing Colin Edwards who moved to Honda. He started the season brilliantly by winning three of the first four races. Unfortunately, his performance declined and he dropped out of championship contention. He won another two races in the season and finished sixth in the championship standing. During the year, Haga also received a wild-card entry to the 1998 500cc Japanese Grand Prix at Suzuka. Haga scored an unexpected third place podium in his 500cc debut. This was his only podium in his brief 500cc/MotoGP career.

The following season, Haga finished seventh in the championship. He only managed one race win and one third-place finish on the new Yamaha YZF-R7. As a result, another Japanese rider, Akira Yanagawa finished fifth, above Haga. This marks the only time Haga was not the highest placed Japanese rider in every season in which he competed in WSBK.

Haga improved his performance to challenge for the title in 2000. However, his season was disrupted when he was tested positive for a banned substance. Haga was tested positive for the substance Ephedrine after the race in South Africa, though it was later learned that Ephedrine occurs naturally in the herbs used in the Ephedra supplement that he had taken during the off-season. He initially received a one-month ban beginning on June 5 and had his points from both South African races deducted. However, after a series of appeals the points from Race 1 in South Africa were reinstated and the ban was delayed and reduced to a two-week ban, resulting in Haga missing the final round at Brands Hatch, Great Britain. With Haga losing 25 points and sitting out a two-race weekend, Colin Edwards comfortably won the 2000 championship.

=== 500cc/MotoGP World Championship ===
After an eventful year, Haga left WSBK and joined the 500cc World Championship for the 2001 season. Haga initially did not want to join the 500cc Championship as he wanted another chance to challenge for the WSBK crown. However, Yamaha had already announced that they were withdrawing from WSBK and focusing on the challenge to win the 500cc Championship. Haga joined the factory-backed Red Bull Yamaha WCM team, riding the Yamaha YZR500. Haga failed to adapt to the new bike and had a disappointing season, without a single podium. He finished 14th in the championship.

Haga returned to WSBK in 2002 in a one-bike Aprilia team, on an Aprilia RSV 1000. He had several podium finishes but no wins. He finished fourth in the overall standing, before moving back to MotoGP in the following season. He was joined by his former teammate Colin Edwards to spearhead Aprilia's MotoGP campaign, riding the newly developed Aprilia RS Cube. Both Haga and Edwards endured another disappointing season with the RS Cube performing poorly. Haga once again finished fourteenth in the championship without a podium.

=== Return to Superbike ===
After another failed attempt in MotoGP, Haga returned to WSBK in 2004. He joined the Renegade Ducati Koji team and was in contention for the championship until the final round, despite several mechanical failures.

For 2005, Haga joined Yamaha Motor Italia, Yamaha's factory supported team. He finished third in the championship and became the first rider to win a dry weather race having failed to lap fast enough to qualify for 'Superpole'.

In 2006, Haga was again Yamaha's leading man. After seven rounds he was second in the championship to Troy Bayliss, without having won a race. At round 7 in Brno, he took pole, but finished third and fourth in the two races, having been passed by Michel Fabrizio on the last lap of both. At round 8 in the UK, he took his first win of the year. At Round 9 at Lausitzring in Germany, Haga picked up two second places after battling for the win in both races. The first race was won by his good friend Yukio Kagayama of Alstare Corona Suzuki and the second by Britain's James Toseland of Winston Ten Kate Honda, who had been his main rival for second place in the championship. For the third season in a row, Haga came third.

Troy Corser joined the Yamaha team for 2007, and together they brought Yamaha the manufacturer's championship. Haga finished second in the riders championship, two points behind Toseland - a double win in the final round at Magny-Cours being just not enough.

Haga continued to ride for Yamaha in 2008. Haga won seven races during the season, with wins at Valencia, Monza, and Magny-Cours, as well as doubles at the Nurburgring and Vallelunga. However, this was only good enough for third in the final standings behind (the winless) Corser and Xerox Ducati's title winner, Troy Bayliss.

In 2009, Haga joined the factory-backed Ducati Xerox Team to replace the retiring Bayliss, winning his first race at Phillip Island, and taking an early championship lead. However, a severe high-side crash during Race 2 in Round 9 at Donington Park put his pursuit of the 2009 championship in doubt. With Haga out of race 2, Ben Spies took victory and reduced Haga's points lead to 14. In the 2011 Superbike World Championship Noriyuki Haga joined the PATA RACING TEAM APRILIA (Satellite Team) as a solo rider on the Aprillia RSV4 Factory bike.

=== British Superbike Championship ===
Haga signed with the Swan Yamaha British Superbike Team for the 2012 season alongside reigning 2011 BSB champion Tommy Hill. Haga marked his BSB debut at the first race of Round 1 at Brands Hatch with a 13th-place finish (Race 2 was cancelled due to extreme track conditions caused by pouring rain). In Round 8 at Cadwell Park, Haga broke his collarbone in a big high-side during free practice and was ruled out for the weekend. After suffering with nagging injuries for most of the season, Haga eventually finished 8th overall. On 16 September 2013, it was announced that Haga would be returning to BSB with Paul Bird Motorsport riding a Kawasaki ZX-10R for the final three rounds of the season.

=== Career summary ===
- World Superbike career
  - 1996: 22nd in World Superbike Championship with Yamaha (2 race as wild-card, 1 podium)
  - 1997: 13th in World Superbike Championship with Yamaha (4 race as replacement rider, 1 win, 3 podiums, 72 points)
  - 1998: 6th in World Superbike Championship with Yamaha WSBK Team (5 wins, 7 podiums, 258 points)
  - 1999: 7th in World Superbike Championship with Yamaha WSBK Team (1 win, 2 podiums, 196 points)
  - 2000: 2nd in World Superbike Championship with Yamaha WSBK Team (4 wins, 11 podiums, 334 points)
  - 2002: 4th in World Superbike Championship with PlayStation 2-FGF Aprilia (7 podiums, 278 points)
  - 2004: 3rd in World Superbike Championship with Renegade Ducati Koji (6 wins, 9 podiums, 299 points)
  - 2005: 3rd in World Superbike Championship with Yamaha Motor Italia WSB (2 wins, 10 podiums, 271 points)
  - 2006: 3rd in World Superbike Championship with Yamaha Motor Italia WSB (1 win, 11 podiums, 326 points)
  - 2007: 2nd in World Superbike Championship with Yamaha Motor Italia WSB (6 wins, 15 podiums, 413 points)
  - 2008: 3rd in World Superbike Championship with Yamaha Motor Italia WSB (7 wins, 11 podiums, 327 points)
  - 2009: 2nd in World Superbike Championship with Ducati Xerox Team (8 wins, 19 podiums, 456 points)
  - 2010: 6th in World Superbike Championship with Ducati Xerox Team (2 wins, 6 podiums, 258 points)
  - 2011: 8th in World Superbike Championship with Pata Aprilia Team (0 wins, 4 podiums, 176 points)
- 500cc/MotoGP career
  - 1998: 20th in 500cc World Championship with Yamaha Racing Team (1 race as wild-card, 1 podium, 16 points)
  - 2001: 14th in 500cc World Championship with Red Bull Yamaha WCM (15 race, 59 points)
  - 2003: 14th in MotoGP World Championship with Alice Aprilia Racing (16 race, 47 points)
- Others
  - 1996: Won Suzuka 8 Hours endurance race with Yamaha (with Colin Edwards)
  - 1997: Won Japanese Superbike Championship with Yamaha
  - 2012: 8th in British Superbike Championship with Swan Yamaha (0 wins, 1 podium, 160 points)
  - 2015: 7th in Asia Road Race SS600 Championship with Team Kagayama Suzuki ASIA (Suzuki GSX-R600)

Years	Series	Poles	Races	Podiums	Wins	2nd place	3rd place	Fastest laps	Titles
All time	World Superbike (SBK)	7	286	110	43	38	29	55	0
2012	British Superbike (BSB)	0	28	1	0	1	0	0	0

== Career statistics ==
=== Superbike World Championship ===
==== Races by year ====
(key) (Races in bold indicate pole position) (Races in italics indicate fastest lap)

Year	Bike	1		2		3		4		5		6		7		8		9		10		11		12		13		14		Pos	Pts
Year	Bike	R1	R2	R1	R2	R1	R2	R1	R2	R1	R2	R1	R2	R1	R2	R1	R2	R1	R2	R1	R2	R1	R2	R1	R2	R1	R2	R1	R2	Pos	Pts
1994	Ducati	GBR	GBR	GER	GER	ITA	ITA	SPA	SPA	AUT	AUT	INA	INA	JPN; 21	JPN; 12	NED	NED	SMR	SMR	EUR	EUR	AUS	AUS							50th	4
1995	Yamaha	GER	GER	SMR	SMR	GBR	GBR	ITA	ITA	SPA	SPA	AUT	AUT	USA	USA	EUR	EUR	JPN; 18	JPN; 19	NED	NED	INA	INA	AUS	AUS					NC	0
1996	Yamaha	SMR	SMR	GBR	GBR	GER	GER	ITA	ITA	CZE	CZE	USA	USA	EUR	EUR	INA	INA	JPN; 2	JPN; DSQ	NED	NED	SPA	SPA	AUS	AUS					22nd	20
1997	Yamaha	AUS	AUS	SMR	SMR	GBR	GBR	GER	GER	ITA	ITA	USA	USA	EUR	EUR	AUT	AUT	NED	NED	SPA	SPA	JPN; 2	JPN; 1	INA; 5	INA; 3					13th	72
1998	Yamaha	AUS; 3	AUS; 1	GBR; 1	GBR; 1	ITA; 9	ITA; 10	**SPA**; 10	**SPA**; 4	GER; 5	GER; 7	SMR; Ret	SMR; Ret	RSA; 7	RSA; 3	USA; Ret	USA; 1	EUR; 12	EUR; 7	AUT; 9	AUT; 12	NED; 8	NED; 8	JPN; Ret	JPN; 1					6th	258
1999	Yamaha	RSA; 4	RSA; Ret	AUS; 6	AUS; 5	GBR; 10	GBR; 6	SPA; 1	SPA; Ret	ITA; 6	ITA; 6	GER; Ret	GER; 6	SMR; 8	SMR; Ret	USA; Ret	USA; 10	EUR; 7	EUR; 3	AUT; Ret	AUT; Ret	NED; 7	NED; 8	GER; 5	GER; 9	JPN; 12	JPN; 4			7th	196
2000	Yamaha	RSA; 2	RSA; DSQ	AUS; 10	AUS; 2	JPN; 2	JPN; 4	GBR; 4	GBR; 4	ITA; Ret	ITA; 5	GER; 3	GER; 1	SMR; 7	SMR; Ret	SPA; 3	SPA; 1	USA; 1	USA; 2	GBR; 5	GBR; 4	NED; 3	NED; 1	GER; 9	GER; 5	GBR; DSQ	GBR; DSQ			**2nd**	**335**
2002	Aprilia	SPA; 2	SPA; 2	AUS; Ret	AUS; 6	RSA; Ret	RSA; 6	**JPN**; 3	**JPN**; 5	ITA; Ret	ITA; 3	GBR; 2	GBR; 10	GER; 4	GER; 5	SMR; 4	SMR; 3	USA; Ret	USA; Ret	GBR; 4	GBR; 5	GER; 7	GER; 4	NED; 3	NED; 6	ITA; 5	ITA; 4			4th	278
2004	Ducati	SPA; Ret	SPA; 1	AUS; 8	AUS; 6	SMR; 4	SMR; 4	ITA; Ret	ITA; Ret	GER; 1	GER; Ret	GBR; 1	GBR; 2	USA; 6	USA; 4	GBR; 1	GBR; 1	NED; 4	NED; 3	ITA; 4	ITA; Ret	FRA; 2	FRA; 1							**3rd**	**299**
2005	Yamaha	QAT; 5	QAT; 11	AUS; Ret	AUS; Ret	SPA; 5	SPA; 4	ITA; 11	ITA; 9	EUR; Ret	EUR; 3	SMR; 6	SMR; 6	CZE; 7	CZE; 1	GBR; 2	GBR; 1	NED; 3	NED; 2	GER; 2	GER; 3	ITA; 3	ITA; C	FRA; Ret	FRA; 3					**3rd**	**271**
2006	Yamaha	QAT; Ret	QAT; 3	AUS; 4	AUS; 4	SPA; 5	SPA; 5	ITA; 4	ITA; 3	EUR; 2	EUR; 2	SMR; 5	SMR; 3	**CZE**; 4	**CZE**; 3	GBR; 3	GBR; 1	NED; Ret	NED; Ret	GER; 2	GER; 2	ITA; 4	ITA; 6	FRA; 2	FRA; 4					**3rd**	**326**
2007	Yamaha	QAT; 8	QAT; 4	AUS; 4	AUS; 3	EUR; 4	EUR; 1	SPA; 2	SPA; 3	NED; 2	NED; Ret	**ITA**; 1	**ITA**; 1	GBR; 2	GBR; C	SMR; Ret	SMR; 2	**CZE**; 4	**CZE**; 4	GBR; 7	GBR; 2	GER; 1	GER; 2	ITA; 4	ITA; 3	FRA; 1	FRA; 1			**2nd**	**413**
2008	Yamaha	QAT; 14	QAT; 13	AUS; 8	AUS; 7	SPA; Ret	SPA; 1	NED; Ret	NED; 2	ITA; 2	ITA; 1	USA; Ret	USA; 6	GER; 1	GER; 1	SMR; 10	SMR; 4	CZE; 6	CZE; 7	GBR; 19	GBR; 2	EUR; Ret	EUR; DSQ	ITA; 1	ITA; 1	**FRA**; 1	**FRA**; 2	POR; Ret	POR; 14	**3rd**	**327**
2009	Ducati	AUS; 1	AUS; 2	QAT; 2	QAT; 2	SPA; 1	SPA; 1	NED; 2	NED; 1	ITA; 2	ITA; Ret	RSA; 1	RSA; 1	USA; 9	USA; 8	SMR; 5	SMR; 3	GBR; 3	GBR; Ret	CZE; 8	CZE; 6	**GER**; 2	**GER**; Ret	ITA; 1	ITA; 2	FRA; 2	FRA; 1	POR; Ret	POR; 2	**2nd**	**456**
2010	Ducati	AUS; 3	AUS; 5	POR; 8	POR; 8	SPA; 5	SPA; 1	NED; 10	NED; Ret	ITA; 11	ITA; 6	RSA; 17	RSA; 10	USA; 3	USA; 4	SMR; 7	SMR; 9	CZE; 6	CZE; 5	GBR; 14	GBR; 13	GER; Ret	GER; 1	ITA; 3	ITA; 2	FRA; 7	FRA; 5			6th	258
2011	Aprilia	AUS; 9	AUS; 7	EUR; 6	EUR; 17	NED; Ret	NED; 8	ITA; 16	ITA; 4	USA; 9	USA; Ret	SMR; Ret	SMR; 3	SPA; 6	SPA; 7	CZE; 12	CZE; 10	GBR; Ret	GBR; Ret	GER; 3	GER; Ret	ITA; 2	ITA; 2	FRA; 7	FRA; 10	POR; 15	POR; 11			8th	176
2013	BMW	AUS	AUS	SPA	SPA	NED	NED	ITA	ITA	GBR	GBR	POR	POR	ITA; 15	ITA; 15	RUS	RUS	GBR	GBR	GER	GER	TUR	TUR	USA	USA	FRA	FRA	SPA	SPA	41st	2

=== FIM Endurance World Championship ===
==== By team ====
Year	Team	Bike	Rider	TC
2012	Yamaha Austria Racing Team	Yamaha YZF-R1	(Australia) Steve Martin (Slovenia) Igor Jerman (France) Gwen Giabbani (Japan) Noriyuki Haga (Japan) Katsuyuki Nakasuga (United Kingdom) Tommy Hill	6th

=== Suzuka 8 Hours results ===
Year	Team	Co-Rider	Bike	Pos
1996	(Japan) Yamaha Racing Team	(United States) Colin Edwards (Japan) Noriyuki Haga	Yamaha YZF750	1st

=== Grand Prix motorcycle racing ===
==== Races by year ====
(key) (Races in bold indicate pole position, races in italics indicate fastest lap)

Year	Class	Bike	1	2	3	4	5	6	7	8	9	10	11	12	13	14	15	16	Pos	Pts
1998	500cc	Yamaha	JPN; 3	MAL	ESP	ITA	FRA	MAD	NED	GBR	GER	CZE	IMO	CAT	AUS	ARG			20th	16
2001	500cc	Yamaha	JPN; Ret	RSA; Ret	SPA; 12	FRA; Ret	ITA; 10	CAT; 10	NED; 10	GBR; 4	GER; 12	CZE; 11	POR; Ret	VAL; Ret	PAC; Ret	AUS; 8	MAL; 9	BRA; DNS	14th	59
2003	MotoGP	Aprilia	JPN; 12	RSA; Ret	SPA; 11	FRA; 8	ITA; Ret	CAT; 12	NED; Ret	GBR; 7	GER; Ret	CZE; 13	POR; 15	BRA; 14	PAC; 12	MAL; 12	AUS; 14	VAL; 15	14th	47

=== British Superbike Championship ===
==== Races by year ====
(key) (Races in bold indicate pole position) (Races in italics indicate fastest lap)

Year	Class	Bike	1		2		3		4		5		6		7		8		9		10		11		12		13		Pos	Pts
Year	Class	Bike	R1	R2	R1	R2	R1	R2	R1	R2	R1	R2	R1	R2	R1	R2	R1	R2	R1	R2	R1	R2	R1	R2	R1	R2	R1	R2	Pos	Pts
2004	BSB	Ducati	SIL	SIL	BHI	BHI	SNE	SNE	OUL; Ret	OUL; 10	MON	MON	THR	THR	BHGP; Ret	BHGP; DNS	KNO	KNO	MAL	MAL	CRO	CRO	CAD	CAD	OUL	OUL	DON	DON	29th	6

Year	Bike	1		2		3			4		5		6			7			8		9		10		11		12			Pos	Pts
Year	Bike	R1	R2	R1	R2	R1	R2	R3	R1	R2	R1	R2	R1	R2	R3	R1	R2	R3	R1	R2	R1	R2	R1	R2	R1	R2	R1	R2	R3	Pos	Pts
2012	Yamaha	BHI; 13	BHI; C	THR; Ret	THR; 10	OUL; 2	OUL; 13	OUL; 6	SNE; 4	SNE; Ret	KNO; 6	KNO; Ret	OUL; 4	OUL; 5	OUL; 4	BHGP; Ret	BHGP; 5		CAD; DNS	CAD; DNS	DON; Ret	DON; 12	ASS; 5	ASS; 6	SIL; 16	SIL; 15	BHGP	BHGP	BHGP	8th	139
2013	Kawasaki	BHI	BHI	THR	THR	OUL	OUL	OUL	KNO	KNO	SNE	SNE	BHGP	BHGP		OUL	OUL	OUL	CAD	CAD	DON	DON	ASS; 5	ASS; Ret	SIL; Ret	SIL; 14	BHGP; 11	BHGP; Ret	BHGP; Ret	23rd	18

Preceded by Aaron Slight (1993–95); Tadayuki Okada (1995)	Suzuka 8 Hours Winner; 1996 (with Colin Edwards)	Succeeded by Tohru Ukawa (1997–98); Shinichi Itoh (1997–98)
