= Colin Edwards =

American motorcycle racer

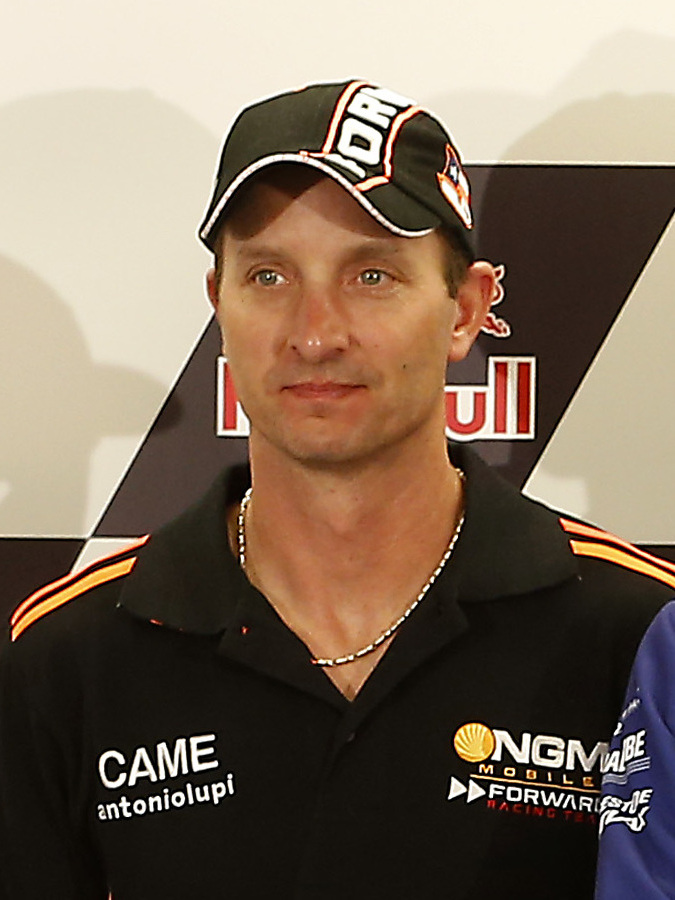
- Edwards in 2014
- Born: February 27, 1974 (age 52); Conroe, Texas, United States
- Website: www.texastornadobootcamp.com www.colinedwards5.com
Motorcycle racing career statistics
MotoGP World Championship
Active years	2003–2014
Manufacturers	Aprilia (2003); Honda (2004); Yamaha (2005–2011); Suter (2012); FTR Kawasaki (2013); Forward Yamaha (2014)
Championships	0
2014 championship position	22nd (11 pts)
Starts / Wins / Podiums / Poles / F. laps / Points; 196 / 0 / 12 / 3 / 3 / 1242
Superbike World Championship
Active years	1995–2002
Manufacturers	Honda, Yamaha
Championships	2 (2000, 2002)
2002 championship position	1st (552 pts)
Starts / Wins / Podiums / Poles / F. laps / Points; 175 / 31 / 75 / 15 / 23 / 2391.5

Colin Edwards II (born February 27, 1974), nicknamed the "Texas Tornado", is an American former professional motorcycle racer who retired half-way through the 2014 season. He is a double World Superbike champion and competed in the MotoGP class from 2003 to 2014.

== Early years ==
Edwards was born in Conroe, Texas. At the age of three, his Australian father, Colin Edwards Sr. (an amateur motorcycle racer himself), introduced him to a minibike, and Edwards entered his first motocross race at the age of four. Over the next ten years, Edwards became one of the top-ranked junior motocross competitors in the US, winning dozens of races in the 50cc to 80cc categories in local, regional and national events.

In 1988, at the age of 14, Edwards stopped competing in motocross races, having become distracted by the normal demands of being a teenager. However, in 1990, Edwards and his father attended a motorcycle road race event in north Texas, and this inspired him to attempt road racing.

In 1991, Edwards began competing in amateur road-racing events locally, but rapidly progressed to national events. He was undefeated in every amateur event he entered that year, and won numerous national amateur titles. His performance was sufficiently impressive for him to be offered a sponsored ride with South West Motorsports, and Edwards turned professional just before the commencement of the 1992 season.

== Career ==
In his first professional season (1992), Edwards entered the AMA 250cc National Series. He won five of the nine races and the national title over second-place earner Kenny Roberts, Jr. In 1993 and 1994, Edwards rode for Vance & Hines on a Yamaha in the AMA Superbike Championship, earning sixth and fifth place overall in those years.

=== Superbike World Championship ===
In 1995, Edwards was offered a factory position with Yamaha in the Superbike World Championship. His results in 1995 were disappointing as Edwards struggled to adjust to the demands of competing in a global competition, and he missed the last two meetings after teammate Yasutomo Nagai perished in a crash at Assen. In 1996 he achieved a greatly improved sixth overall in the Superbike World championship.

1997 was a disappointing year for Edwards as he was forced to withdraw from competing due to injuries sustained in the fifth round of the Superbike World Championship. He was replaced in the Yamaha World Superbike Team and was unable to negotiate a position in the 500cc Grand Prix competition. Fortunately Edwards was able to conclude a deal with Honda to ride the RC45 motorcycle in the 1998 Superbike World Championship. Edwards finished fifth overall that year, and earned his first solo international victories with a double win at Monza followed by his third win of the season at Brands Hatch.

In 1999, Edwards managed several more victories for Honda (including leading teammate Aaron Slight home twice at Brands Hatch, giving Honda a rare Double-1-2) and ended the season in second overall position, behind champion Carl Fogarty. In 2000, Edwards rode the new Honda VTR-1000 SP1/RC51 twin cylinder motorcycle to overall victory in the Superbike World Championship after Yamaha rider and points leader, Noriyuki Haga was disqualified for testing positive for a banned substance. Edwards came second to Ducati rider, Troy Bayliss in 2001 but reclaimed the title from Bayliss in 2002 in a dramatic fashion, clinching the championship in the final race of the season in Imola (Italy). Edwards also holds the record for the most points in a single season with 552 points in 2002 breaking the previous record of 489 points set by Carl Fogarty in 1999. Runner-up Troy Bayliss also broke the previous record with 541 points.

=== MotoGP World Championship ===
After winning his second Superbike World Championship Edwards moved to MotoGP in 2003. He rode for the Aprilia team on the RS Cube, during which time his machine caught fire due to an incorrectly fitted fuel cap at Sachsenring.

2004 saw Edwards riding for Telefonica Movistar Honda, and he achieved his first MotoGP podium position at Donington. Edwards finished the season in fifth overall position.

In 2005, Edwards moved to Gauloises Yamaha factory team as the teammate to the world champion Valentino Rossi. His best result for 2005 was a second position at Laguna Seca, behind compatriot Nicky Hayden. He finished the season fourth overall.

==== 2006 ====
For 2006, Edwards continued riding for the Camel Yamaha factory team on board the YZR-M1 with teammate and good friend Valentino Rossi in the MotoGP championship. The factory Yamaha team had a troubling start to their racing year with "chatter" problems and tire wear issues.

The factory team built a new chassis for the 2006 spec YZR-M1 to combat the aforementioned problems. Rossi took to the new chassis quickly and rode to victory at his home race of Mugello for the fifth consecutive time since 2001. Edwards did not have the time to "gel" with the new chassis early in the season, which resulted in him sticking with the older version for the Mugello race. He finished 12th.

At Assen, Edwards took the lead at the start, and led until Nicky Hayden passed him on the penultimate lap. He caught back up to his countryman on the last lap, and managed to pass him a few corners from the end. When Hayden attempted to pass him again in the final chicane, Edwards ran across the AstroTurf and lost control of his bike, which briefly continued on without him. He remounted to finish 13th. Hayden, who ran across the gravel on the final chicane himself, managed to keep control of his bike and won the race. At his home race, the Red Bull U.S. Grand Prix, Edwards finished ninth suffering tire problems in the scorching heat like his teammate Valentino Rossi. At Estoril he qualified second and finished fourth in one of his most competitive showings of the season.

==== 2007 ====
2007 brought great prospects early on. Edwards entered his second of a two-year deal with Yamaha factory team, now known as Fiat Yamaha riding the new Yamaha YZR-M1 800cc. Yet after starting second on the grid in Istanbul, a first lap crash caused by Olivier Jacque took him out. At Le Mans, Edwards took pole position, but made a slow start and gambled on switching to wet tyres in damp conditions. He did this too early, and by the time it was wet enough his tyres had shredded, forcing him to pit again and finish at the back of the field.

Fiat Yamaha was having problems with the M1 and the Michelin tires, Edwards along with teammate Valentino Rossi both struggled to find competitive set up nearly the entire season to run up front. Edwards best result of the season was second (equaling his career best in MotoGP) at the wet British Grand Prix at Donington Park.

==== 2008 ====
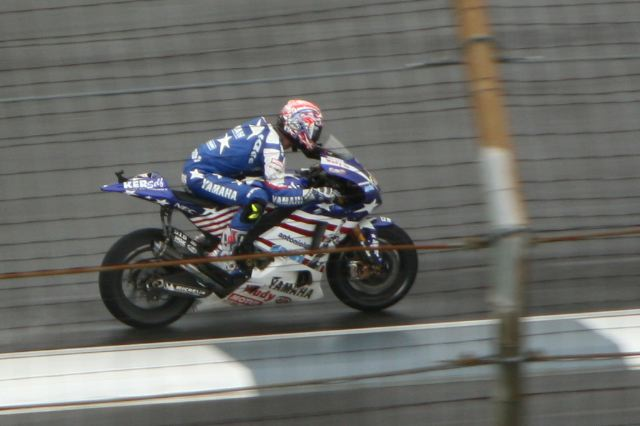
Edwards at the 2008 Indianapolis Grand Prix

For the 2008 season, Edwards continued in MotoGP, this time for the satellite Tech3 Yamaha team alongside fellow Superbike World Champion James Toseland. A series of solid performances left him fifth in the overall standings after nine rounds, never qualifying lower than 6th on the grid and finishing on the podium twice. After qualifying sixth for round 9 at Assen, he was delayed by Rossi's early crash and was in next to last place at the end of the first lap (in front of only Rossi, who was able to rejoin the race), however he then fought back to snatch third from Nicky Hayden at the final corner after Hayden ran out of fuel, gaining a measure of revenge for the 2006 race at the track. Colin Edwards results started to suffer after a crash in Germany. In the next four races, Edwards failed to break the top-ten and his best result since the podium at Assen was a sixth place at the final round of the season at Valencia.

Edwards confirmed that he had signed for Tech3 for yet another season. "It is no secret that I had agreed with Yamaha to finish my MotoGP career at the end of 2008 and continue my racing career with them in America, but as soon as I began working with the Tech3 team I instantly formed a great relationship with my guys." Therefore, Edwards will once again be riding for Tech3 Yamaha in 2009 as he searches for his first MotoGP victory.

==== 2009 ====
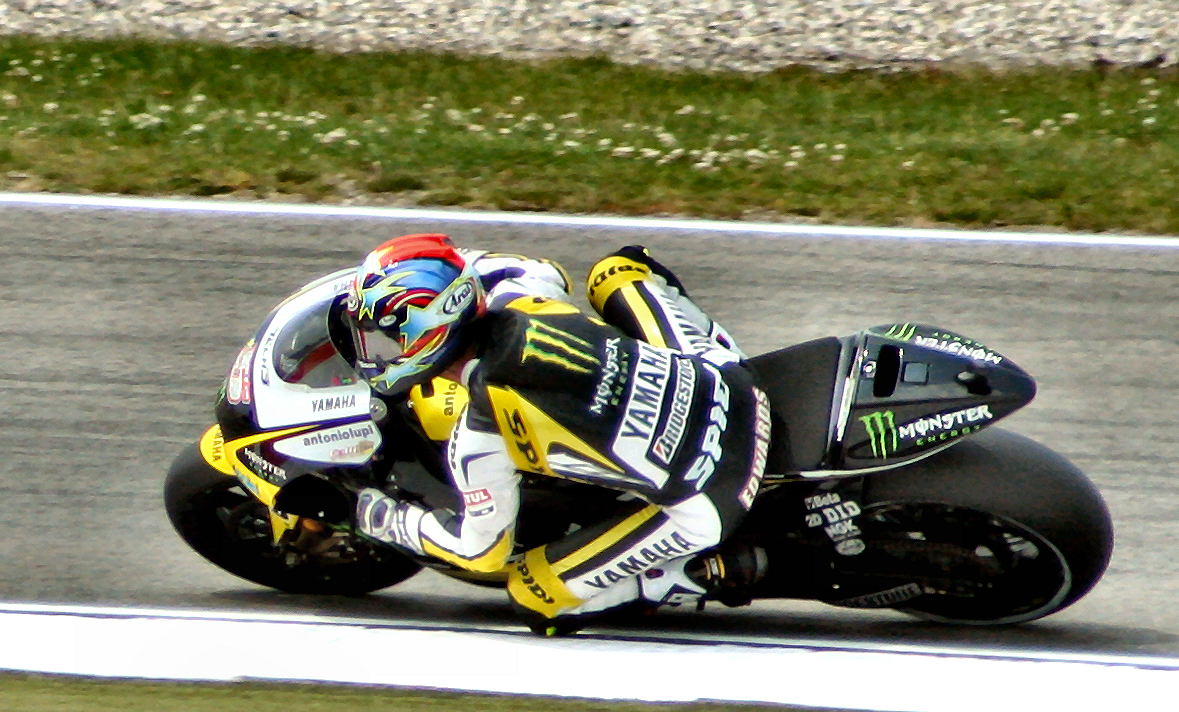
Edwards at the 2009 Dutch TT

Edwards once again demonstrated consistent form in the 2009 MotoGP season, establishing himself as the strongest satellite rider in the championship. He secured a second-place finish in the British Grand Prix at Donington Park.

After being caught in a crash at the San Marino Grand Prix, Edwards directed typically outspoken criticism towards Alex de Angelis, claiming: "We are in Italy and occasionally you have to deal with an Italian rider who wants to be a hero and today that was De Angelis. De Angelis is the guy who needed to be wearing Valentino’s donkey helmet," in reference to a special edition helmet being worn by Valentino Rossi.

==== 2010 ====
On October 1, 2009, Edwards announced that he had signed a one-year contract extension that would see him ride for Tech3 Yamaha in the 2010 season. His teammate would be fellow American Ben Spies.

==== 2011 ====
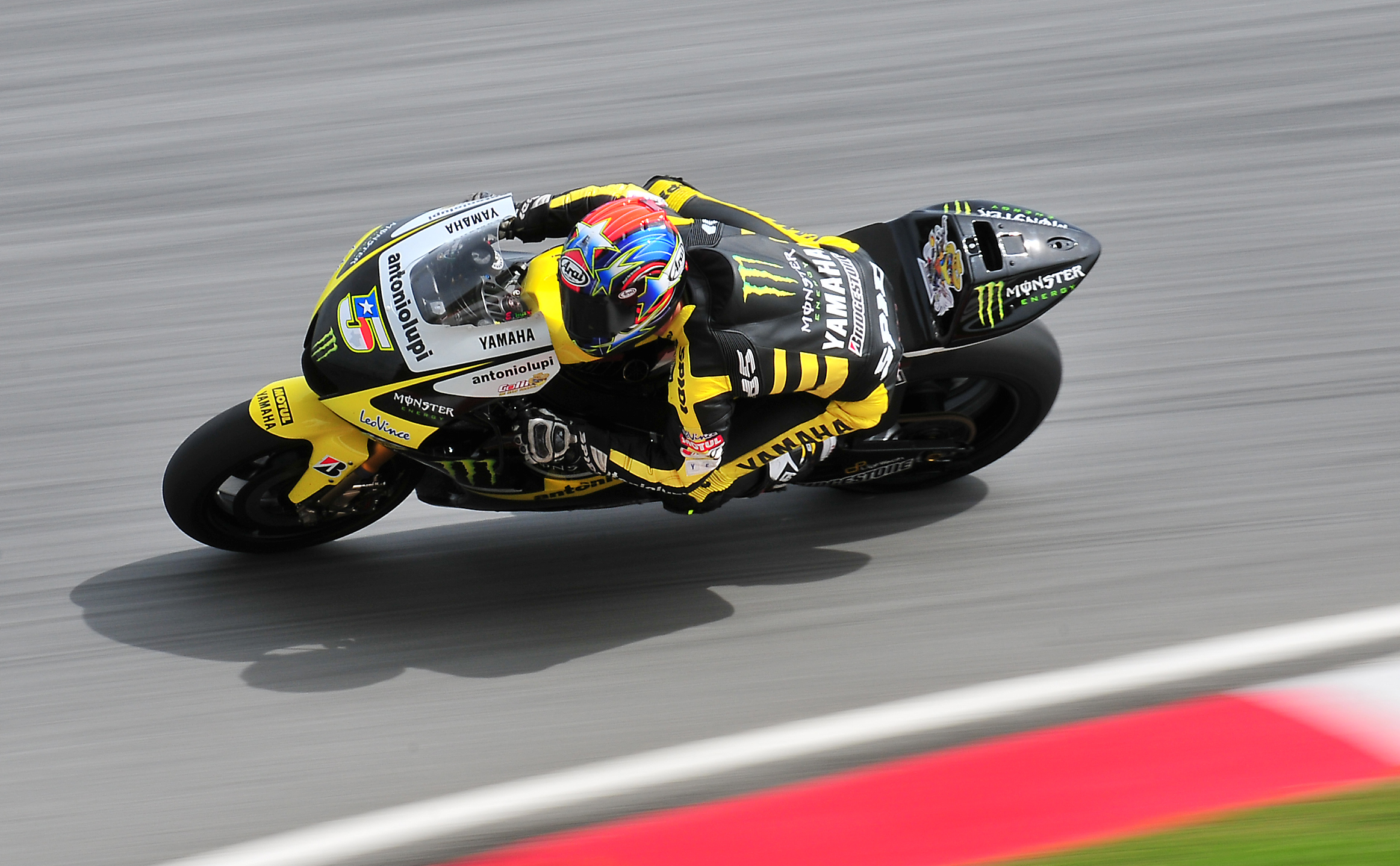
Colin Edwards in 2011

On September 19, 2010, Edwards signed a one-year contract extension to ride for Tech3 Yamaha in the 2011 season, partnering Cal Crutchlow.

At the Catalan Grand Prix, Edwards broke his right collarbone during second practice, which successfully had a plate added. Nine days later, and in his first race since injury, Edwards took a third-place finish at the British Grand Prix at Silverstone, having been promoted to a podium placing after accidents for Jorge Lorenzo and Marco Simoncelli. It was his first podium finish since a second-place result at the 2009 British Grand Prix at Donington Park.

On October 23, along with Valentino Rossi, Edwards was involved in the accident that killed Marco Simoncelli at the Malaysian Grand Prix, injuring his left shoulder and ending his season. Josh Hayes replaced him for Valencia.

==== 2012 ====
On September 3, 2011, Edwards announced that he would leave the Tech3 team, to ride as the single entry for NGM Mobile Forward Racing in 2012. The team was making their re-entry to the premier class under the new Claiming Rule Teams regulations with a Suter chassis powered by a BMW engine.

==== 2013 ====
Remaining with Forward Racing for 2013, Edwards was partnered with rookie Claudio Corti on FTR-Kawasaki machinery.

==== 2014 ====
Edwards again remained with Forward Racing for 2014, this time partnering Aleix Espargaró on Yamaha-based machines. At a press conference prior to the 2014 Motorcycle Grand Prix of the Americas, Edwards announced that the 2014 season would be his final MotoGP season, citing the struggle to adapt to a different riding style. It was stated after the Indianapolis round, that he would not compete in the second half of the season, and was replaced by Alex de Angelis. During commentary for the British MotoGP round at Silverstone on August 31, 2014, Edwards revealed he would be a test rider for Yamaha and Michelin for the next two years.

=== Suzuka 8 Hours ===
In 1996, Edwards teamed with Noriyuki Haga to claim victory in the Suzuka 8 Hours endurance race riding a Yamaha, his first international victory. Edwards won the 8 Hours two more times: in 2001 with Valentino Rossi, and in 2002 with the late Daijiro Kato, both times with Honda.

=== Other racing activities ===
Edwards has twice represented the United States in the Michelin Race of Champions Nation's Cup, first in 2000 and again in 2002 when the US team won the event. The competition involves a national team that includes an automobile racer, a rally/off-road driver and a motorcycle racer. The 2002 US team included former off-road racer and NASCAR rookie Jimmie Johnson as the rally driver, and four-time NASCAR champion Jeff Gordon in the automobile category.

== Broadcasting ==
Following the end of his racing career, Edwards joined British MotoGP broadcaster BT Sport in 2016 as a pundit in their pre- and post-race programming.

== Texas Tornado Boot Camp ==
The Colin Edwards Texas Tornado Boot Camp or TTBC is a world class motorcycle training facility built on a 20-acre (81,000 m^{2}) plot of land near Lake Conroe. It is a premier training facility for those new to riding, motorcycle enthusiasts, as well as professionals looking to polish up on their skills. TTBC offers a wide range of moto training and events including one- and two-day camps, private camps, Dirt Wars, racers camps and The Colin Edwards four-day Experience. The "Colin Edwards Experience" is a four-day camp with Edwards himself involved in the training, including time on the 500-yard gun range.

=== Training facilities ===
TTBC includes a 0.125 mi (0.201 km) dirt oval, covered TT track with lights for night riding, open TT track, 500-yard gun range, Mini Bike MX Track, and a 5,000-square-foot (460 m^{2}) bunk house and classroom facility.

The Facilities as of August 1, 2010
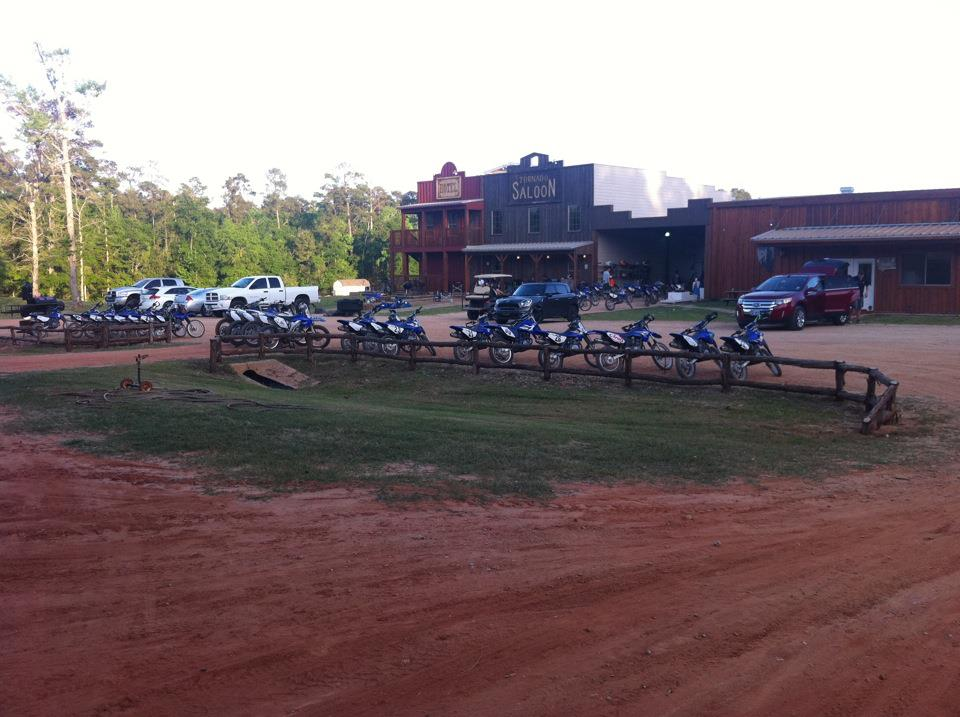
TTBC Morning

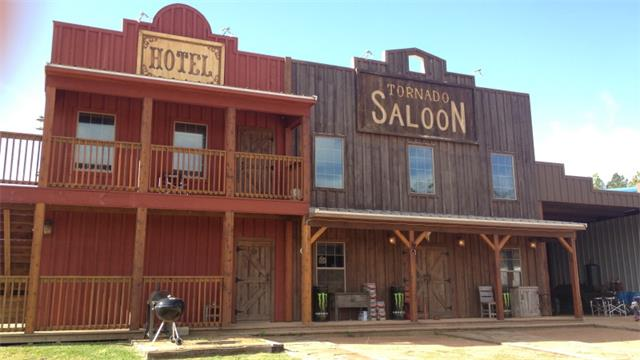
TTBC Bunkhouse

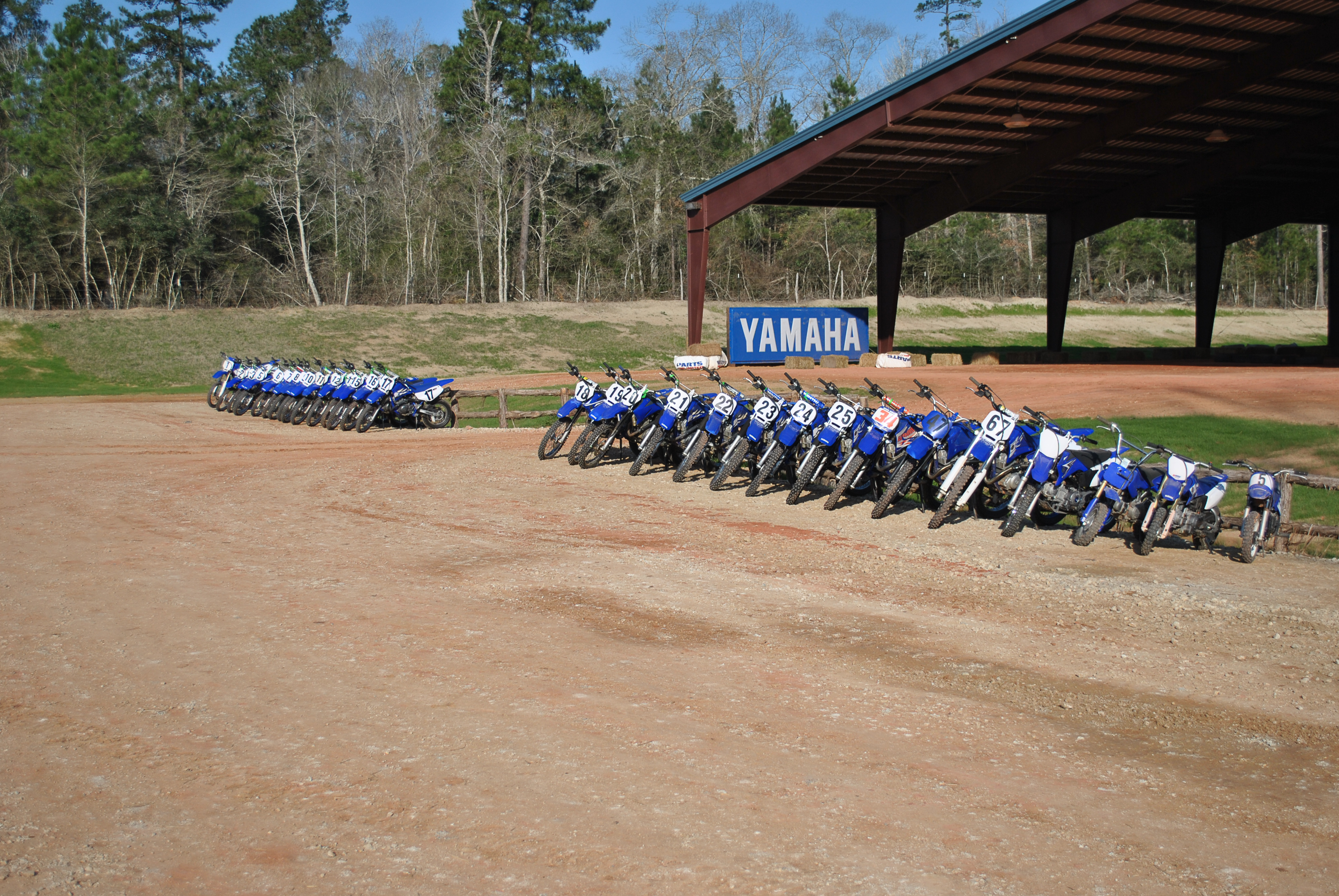
TTBC Yamaha Fleet

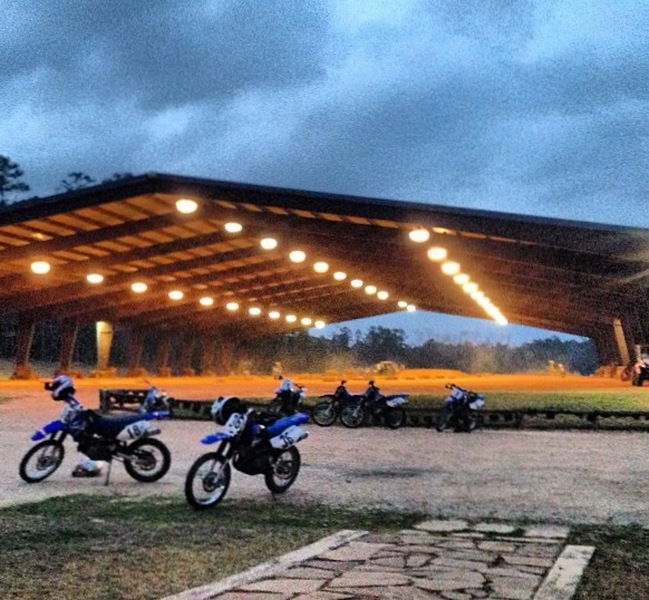
TTBC Night Track

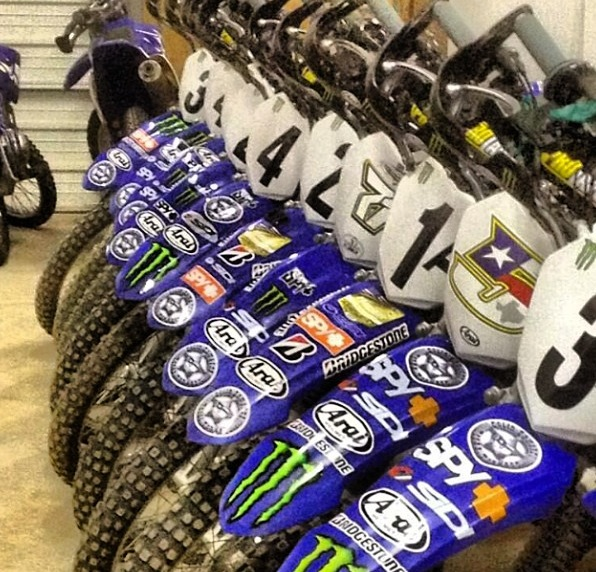
Texas Tornado Boot Camp

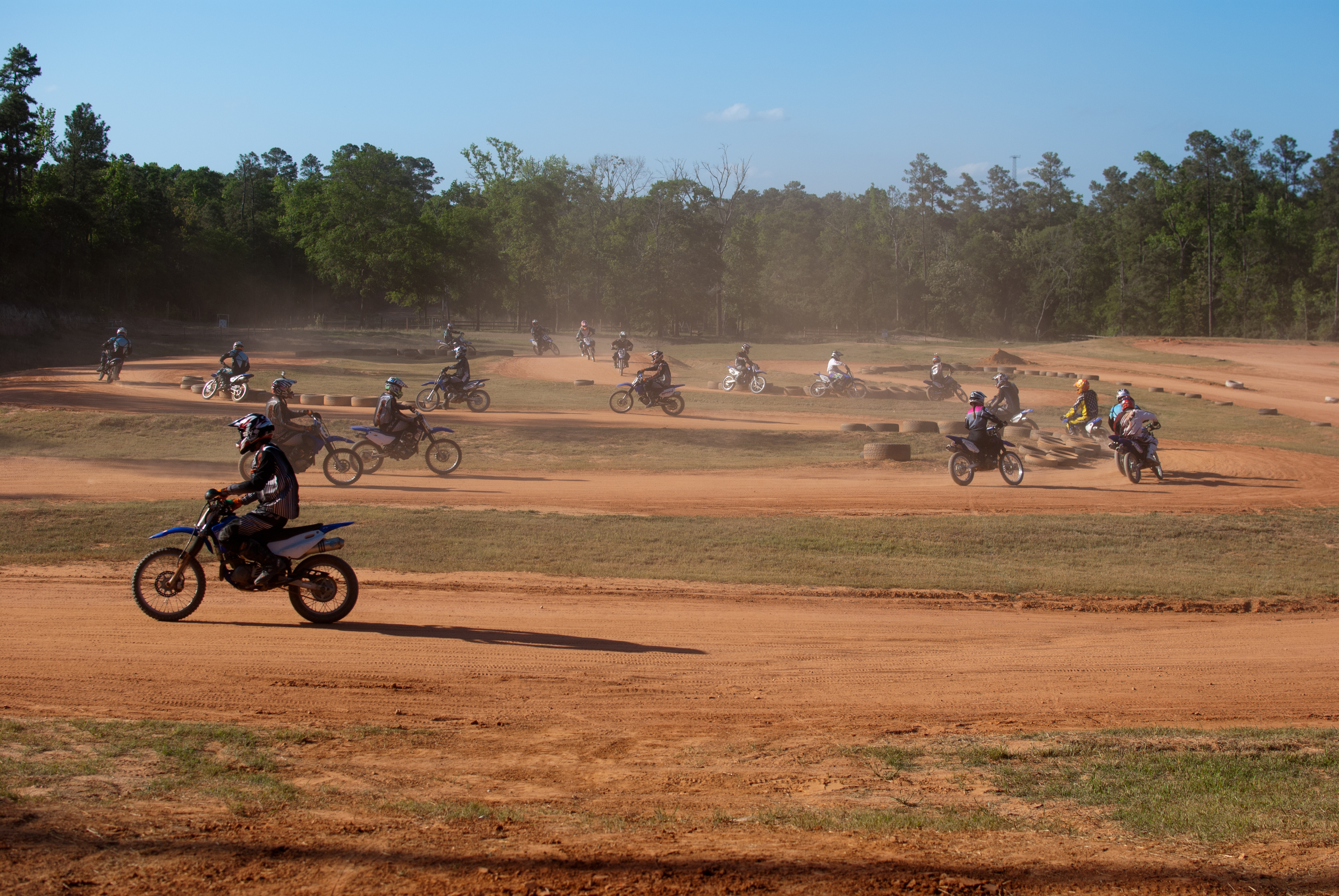
TTBC Open TT Track

== Career statistics ==
=== Superbike World Championship ===
==== By season ====
Season	Motorcycle	Team	Race	Win	Podium	Pole	FLap	Pts	Plcd	WCh
1995	Yamaha	Yamaha World Superbike Team	20	0	2	0	1	141	11th	–
1996	Yamaha	Yamaha World Superbike Team	20	0	7	2	0	248	5th	–
1997	Yamaha	Yamaha World Superbike Team	8	0	1	0	1	79	12th	–
1998	Honda	Castrol Honda	24	3	6	0	0	277.5	5th	–
1999	Honda	Castrol Honda	26	5	10	2	3	361	**2nd**	–
2000	Honda	Castrol Honda	26	8	12	6	6	400	**1st**	1
2001	Honda	Castrol Honda	25	4	12	0	4	333	**2nd**	–
2002	Honda	Castrol Honda	26	11	25	5	8	552	**1st**	1
Total			**175**	**31**	**75**	**15**	**23**	**2391.5**		**2**

==== Races by year ====
(key) (Races in bold indicate pole position, races in italics indicate fastest lap)

Year	Bike	1		2		3		4		5		6		7		8		9		10		11		12		13		Pos	Pts
Year	Bike	R1	R2	R1	R2	R1	R2	R1	R2	R1	R2	R1	R2	R1	R2	R1	R2	R1	R2	R1	R2	R1	R2	R1	R2	R1	R2	Pos	Pts
1995	Yamaha	GER; 7	GER; 5	SMR; Ret	SMR; Ret	GBR; 18	GBR; 12	ITA; 3	ITA; 5	ESP; 10	ESP; 11	AUT; 9	AUT; Ret	USA; 8	USA; 9	GBR; 5	GBR; 2	JPN; 6	JPN; 10	NED; Ret	NED; 6	INA	INA	AUS	AUS			11th	141
1996	Yamaha	SMR; 11	SMR; 7	GBR; 6	GBR; 4	GER; 3	GER; 5	ITA; 3	ITA; 5	CZE; 6	CZE; 7	USA; 4	USA; Ret	GBR; 4	GBR; 3	**INA**; 5	**INA**; 4	JPN	JPN	NED	NED	ESP; 2	ESP; 3	**AUS**; 2	**AUS**; 3			5th	248
1997	Yamaha	AUS; Ret	AUS; 2	SMR; 6	SMR; 8	GBR; 5	GBR; 6	GER; 7	GER; 5	ITA	ITA	USA	USA	GBR	GBR	AUT	AUT	NED	NED	ESP	ESP	JPN	JPN	INA	INA			12th	79
1998	Honda	AUS; 7	AUS; 7	GBR; 6	GBR; 7	ITA; 1	ITA; 1	ESP; 5	ESP; Ret	GER; 2	GER; 2	SMR; 3	SMR; 4	RSA; 9	RSA; 4	USA; 11	USA; 10	GBR; 1	GBR; 4	AUT; 7	AUT; 9	NED; 5	NED; 4	JPN; 13	JPN; 13			5th	279.5
1999	Honda	RSA; 5	RSA; 4	AUS; 3	AUS; 3	GBR; 3	GBR; 1	ESP; Ret	ESP; 1	**ITA**; 2	**ITA**; 2	GER; Ret	GER; 4	SMR; 6	SMR; 7	USA; 4	USA; 5	GBR; 1	GBR; 1	**AUT**; 1	**AUT**; 8	NED; 5	NED; 5	GER; 4	GER; 5	JPN; 9	JPN; 9	**2nd**	**361**
2000	Honda	RSA; 1	RSA; 1	AUS; 5	AUS; 5	**JPN**; 5	**JPN**; 3	**GBR**; 1	**GBR**; Ret	**ITA**; 2	**ITA**; 1	**GER**; 4	**GER**; 2	SMR; Ret	SMR; 10	ESP; 5	ESP; 4	USA; 2	USA; 4	GBR; 10	GBR; 6	**NED**; 1	**NED**; 5	**GER**; 1	**GER**; 1	GBR; 8	GBR; 1	**1st**	**400**
2001	Honda	ESP; 6	ESP; 4	RSA; 1	RSA; Ret	AUS; 1	AUS; C	JPN; 12	JPN; 13	ITA; 2	ITA; 2	GBR; 5	GBR; 6	GER; 1	GER; 3	SMR; 3	SMR; 11	USA; 6	USA; 6	GBR; 3	GBR; 5	GER; 1	GER; 2	NED; 3	NED; 10	ITA; 3	ITA; Ret	**2nd**	**333**
2002	Honda	ESP; 4	ESP; 3	**AUS**; 2	**AUS**; 2	**RSA**; 2	**RSA**; 3	JPN; 1	JPN; 2	ITA; 3	ITA; 2	GBR; 1	GBR; 2	GER; 2	GER; 2	SMR; 2	SMR; 2	**USA**; 3	**USA**; 1	GBR; 1	GBR; 1	GER; 1	GER; 1	**NED**; 1	**NED**; 1	**ITA**; 1	**ITA**; 1	**1st**	**552**

=== Suzuka 8 Hours results ===
Year	Team	Co-Rider	Bike	Pos
1996	(Japan) Yamaha Racing Team	(United States) Colin Edwards (Japan) Noriyuki Haga	Yamaha YZF750	1st
2000	(Japan) Castrol Honda	(United States) Colin Edwards (Italy) Valentino Rossi	Honda VTR1000SPW	Ret
2001	(Japan) Team Cabin Honda	(United States) Colin Edwards (Italy) Valentino Rossi	Honda VTR1000SPW	1st
2002	(Japan) Team Cabin Honda	(Japan) Daijiro Kato (United States) Colin Edwards	Honda VTR1000SPW	1st

=== Grand Prix motorcycle racing ===
==== By season ====
Season	Class	Motorcycle	Team	Race	Win	Podium	Pole	FLap	Pts	Plcd	WCh
2003	MotoGP	Aprilia RS Cube	Alice Aprilia Racing	16	0	0	0	0	62	13th	–
2004	MotoGP	Honda RC211V	Telefonica Movistar Honda	16	0	2	0	2	157	5th	–
2005	MotoGP	Yamaha YZR-M1	Gauloises Yamaha Team	17	0	3	0	1	179	4th	–
2006	MotoGP	Yamaha YZR-M1	Camel Yamaha Team	17	0	1	0	0	124	7th	–
2007	MotoGP	Yamaha YZR-M1	Fiat Yamaha Team	18	0	2	2	0	124	9th	–
2008	MotoGP	Yamaha YZR-M1	Tech3 Yamaha	18	0	2	1	0	144	7th	–
2009	MotoGP	Yamaha YZR-M1	Monster Yamaha Tech3	17	0	1	0	0	161	5th	–
2010	MotoGP	Yamaha YZR-M1	Monster Yamaha Tech3	18	0	0	0	0	103	11th	–
2011	MotoGP	Yamaha YZR-M1	Monster Yamaha Tech3	15	0	1	0	0	109	9th	–
2012	MotoGP	Suter MMX1	NGM Mobile Forward Racing	16	0	0	0	0	27	20th	–
2013	MotoGP	FTR Kawasaki	NGM Mobile Forward Racing	18	0	0	0	0	41	14th	–
2014	MotoGP	Forward Yamaha	NGM Forward Racing	10	0	0	0	0	11	22nd	–
Total				**196**	**0**	**12**	**3**	**3**	**1242**		**0**

==== By class ====
Class	Seasons	1st GP	1st Pod	1st Win	Race	Win	Podiums	Pole	FLap	Pts	WChmp
MotoGP	2003–2014	2003 Japan	2004 Great Britain		196	0	12	3	3	1242	0
Total	2003–2014				**196**	**0**	**12**	**3**	**3**	**1242**	**0**

==== Races by year ====
(key) (Races in bold indicate pole position, races in italics indicate fastest lap)

Year	Class	Bike	1	2	3	4	5	6	7	8	9	10	11	12	13	14	15	16	17	18	Pos	Pts
2003	MotoGP	Aprilia	JPN; 6	RSA; Ret	SPA; 14	FRA; 10	ITA; 9	CAT; Ret	NED; 7	GBR; 10	GER; 14	CZE; 12	POR; 14	BRA; 13	PAC; 17	MAL; 13	AUS; 16	VAL; 8			13th	62
2004	MotoGP	Honda	RSA; 7	SPA; 7	FRA; 5	ITA; 12	CAT; 5	NED; 6	BRA; 6	GER; 5	GBR; 2	CZE; 7	POR; 9	JPN; Ret	QAT; 2	MAL; 11	AUS; 4	VAL; 8			5th	157
2005	MotoGP	Yamaha	SPA; 9	POR; 6	CHN; 8	FRA; 3	ITA; 9	CAT; 7	NED; 3	USA; 2	GBR; 4	GER; 8	CZE; 7	JPN; 6	MAL; 10	QAT; 4	AUS; 6	TUR; 7	VAL; 8		4th	179
2006	MotoGP	Yamaha	SPA; 11	QAT; 9	TUR; 9	CHN; 3	FRA; 6	ITA; 12	CAT; 5	NED; 13	GBR; 6	GER; 12	USA; 9	CZE; 10	MAL; 10	AUS; Ret	JPN; 8	POR; 4	VAL; 9		7th	124
2007	MotoGP	Yamaha	QAT; 6	SPA; 3	TUR; Ret	CHN; 11	**FRA**; 12	ITA; 12	CAT; 10	**GBR**; 2	NED; 6	GER; 4	USA; 11	CZE; Ret	RSM; 9	POR; 10	JPN; 14	AUS; 9	MAL; 10	VAL; 13	9th	124
2008	MotoGP	Yamaha	QAT; 7	SPA; Ret	POR; 4	**CHN**; 7	FRA; 3	ITA; 5	CAT; 5	GBR; 4	NED; 3	GER; Ret	USA; 14	CZE; 14	RSM; 10	INP; 15	JPN; 7	AUS; 8	MAL; 8	VAL; 6	7th	144
2009	MotoGP	Yamaha	QAT; 4	JPN; 12	SPA; 7	FRA; 7	ITA; 6	CAT; 7	NED; 4	USA; 7	GER; 9	GBR; 2	CZE; 7	INP; 5	RSM; Ret	POR; 5	AUS; 5	MAL; 13	VAL; 4		5th	161
2010	MotoGP	Yamaha	QAT; 8	SPA; 12	FRA; 12	ITA; 13	GBR; 9	NED; 8	CAT; 11	GER; Ret	USA; 7	CZE; 7	INP; Ret	RSM; 7	ARA; 12	JPN; 5	MAL; NC	AUS; 7	POR; 7	VAL; 12	11th	103
2011	MotoGP	Yamaha	QAT; 8	SPA; Ret	POR; 6	FRA; 13	CAT; DNS	GBR; 3	NED; 7	ITA; 9	GER; 10	USA; 8	CZE; 8	INP; 7	RSM; 13	ARA; 13	JPN; 8	AUS; 5	MAL; C	VAL	9th	109
2012	MotoGP	Suter	QAT; 12	SPA; 16	POR; DNS	FRA	CAT; NC	GBR; 16	NED; Ret	GER; 12	ITA; Ret	USA; 13	INP; 13	CZE; 13	RSM; 11	ARA; 18	JPN; 13	MAL; Ret	AUS; Ret	VAL; 14	20th	27
2013	MotoGP	FTR Kawasaki	QAT; Ret	AME; Ret	SPA; 15	FRA; 16	ITA; 14	CAT; 9	NED; 17	GER; 13	USA; 12	INP; 13	CZE; 11	GBR; 14	RSM; 12	ARA; 16	MAL; 15	AUS; 12	JPN; 12	VAL; 15	14th	41
2014	MotoGP	Forward Yamaha	QAT; 9	AME; Ret	ARG; 20	SPA; Ret	FRA; 17	ITA; 15	CAT; 18	NED; 22	GER; 20	INP; 13	CZE	GBR	RSM	ARA	JPN	AUS	MAL	VAL	22nd	11

== Bibliography ==
- Edwards, Colin (July 3, 2003). Colin Edwards: The Texas Tornado. Haynes Publishing. ISBN 978-1844250110.

Sporting positions
Preceded by Aaron Slight (1993–95); Tadayuki Okada (1995)	Suzuka 8 Hours Winner; 1996 (with Noriyuki Haga)	Succeeded by Tohru Ukawa (1997–98); Shinichi Itoh (1997–98)
Preceded by Tohru Ukawa; Daijiro Kato	Suzuka 8 Hours Winner; 1996 (with Noriyuki Haga), 2001 (with Valentino Rossi), 2002 (with Daijiro Kato)	Succeeded by Yukio Nukumi; Manabu Kamada
Preceded by Fernando Alonso; Jesús Puras; Rubén Xaus	Race of Champions; Nations' Cup; 2002 with: Jeff Gordon; Jimmie Johnson	Succeeded by Cristiano da Matta; Fonsi Nieto; Gilles Panizzi
