= Troy Corser =

Australian motorcycle racer

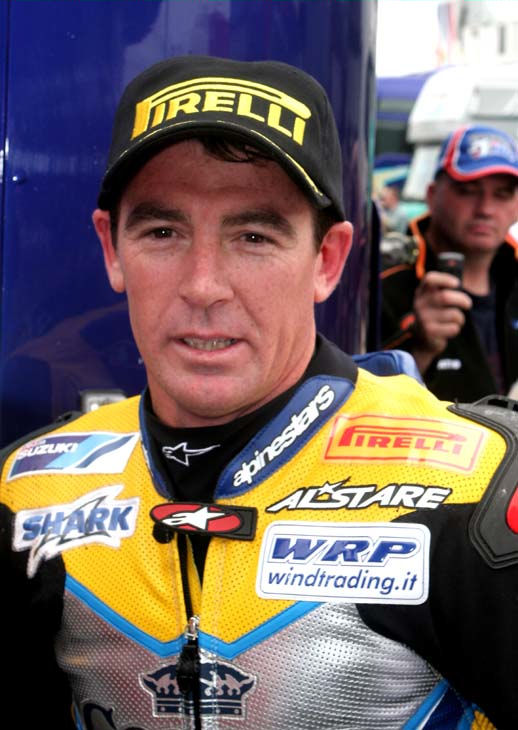
- Nationality: Australian
- Website: troycorser11.com
Motorcycle racing career statistics
Grand Prix motorcycle racing
Active years	1997
First race	1997 500cc Malaysian Grand Prix
Last race	1997 500cc Dutch TT
Team	Yamaha
Championships	0
Starts / Wins / Podiums / Poles / F. laps / Points; 7 / 0 / 0 / 0 / 0 / 11
Superbike World Championship
Active years	1992, 1994–1996, 1998–2001, 2003–2011
Manufacturers	Ducati, Aprilia, Petronas, Suzuki, Yamaha, BMW
Championships	2 (1996, 2005)
2011 championship position	15th (87 pts)
Starts / Wins / Podiums / Poles / F. laps / Points; 377 / 33 / 130 / 43 / 45 / 4021,5

Troy Gordon Corser (born 27 November 1971) is an Australian former professional motorcycle road racer. He competed in the Superbike World Championship from 1992 to 2011 except for the 1997 season when he competed in Grand Prix motorcycle racing. Corser won the Superbike World championship in 1996 and 2005. He held the record for most World Superbike Championship race starts with 377 until 2023 when another Superbike legend Jonathan Rea overtook him.

== Career ==
Corser was born in Wollongong, New South Wales, Australia. Having previously won the Australian and AMA Superbike Championship titles, and shone in a handful of wildcard rides in the Superbike World Championship (taking five podiums), he went to the series full-time in 1995. He was classified 11th in WSBK for 1994, hence his riding #11, which he used for many years. Pole for the first round showed his potential, although he only took one podium until his win at round 5 at the Salzburgring (partly due to collisions with Anthony Gobert and Piergorgio Bontempi at Monza). A strong remainder of the season (including a win at Laguna Seca, one of the few tracks on the schedule that he knew) saw him beat Aaron Slight to 2nd overall.

Corser won this title in 1996, becoming the series' youngest champion, but 1997 was an unsuccessful and fragmented year in the 500cc World Championship, while teamed with Luca Cadalora on Yamaha YZR-500, Power Horse backed, team.

Back in WSBK for 1998, Corser came close to retaking the title, helped by a double win at Laguna, the second race by a mere 0.005sec. He led the standings before the final round, took pole, but crashing and breaking ribs in a warm-up accident. For 1999 he was teamed with Carl Fogarty on Davide Tardozzi's team, the title going to Foggy with Corser again third. In 2000 and 2001, he was on a factory Aprilia RSV-Mille. He would take the Aprilia to its first WSBK wins in 2000, and opened 2001 with a double victory in South Africa, but a double DNF at Monza scuppered his hopes of a championship challenge.

In 2002, Corser joined Carl Fogarty's Petronas Superbike team, and spent the year developing the bike before racing it in 2003 and 2004. He finished ninth in the 2004 championship, with a best result of third, but chose to leave the team after this.

In 2005, Corser raced for the Alstare Suzuki Team on the GSX-R1000 which enabled him to regain his position as Superbike World Champion, winning the championship after a run of early-season victories - later in the season Chris Vermeulen and Noriyuki Haga were usually the men to beat.

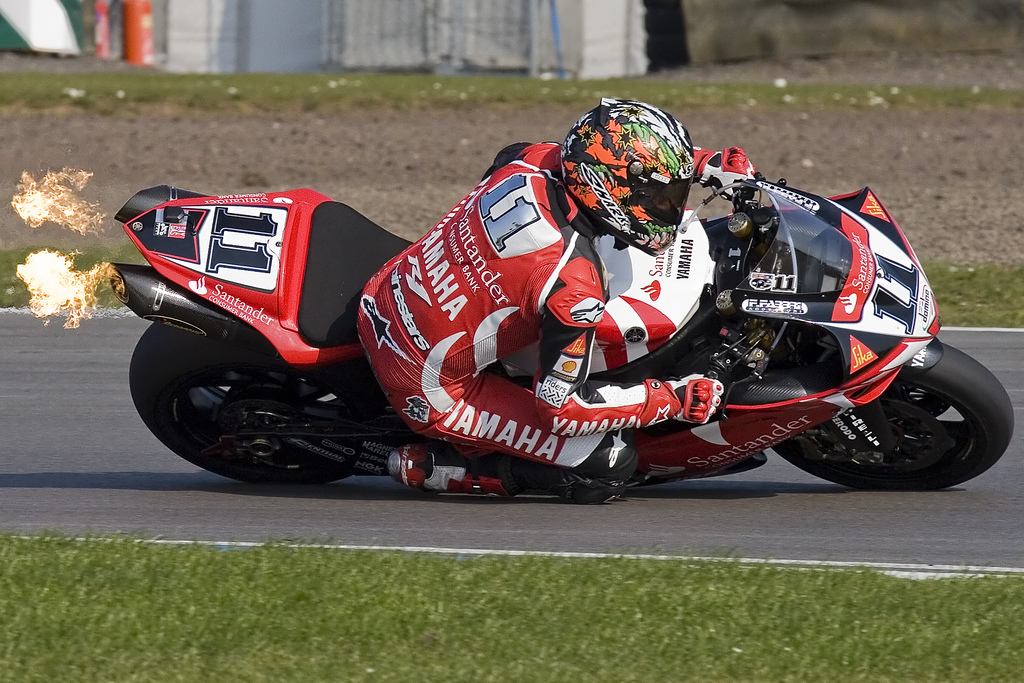
Corser at Donington Park World Superbike races in 2007

Corser won two races early in 2006, however a crash at Phillip Island, and a DNF at Silverstone enabled compatriot Troy Bayliss to gain the upper hand in the early stages of the title chase. A double non-finish at Assen with 4 rounds to go left him fifth in the championship, behind Bayliss, James Toseland, Noriyuki Haga and Andrew Pitt. He ultimately overhauled Pitt to finish fourth, through a double podium at the final round.

For 2007, Corser left Suzuki to join Yamaha. However, he was outpaced by teammate Noriyuki Haga and finished fifth overall, with eight podiums but no wins. He remained with the team for 2008, pipping Haga to finish as championship runner-up behind Bayliss.

For the 2009 WSBK season, Corser signed with BMW to ride alongside Ruben Xaus on BMW's new superbike. His best result in the first half of the season was an eighth place in the opener at Philip Island, although there were several other minor points finishes. Strong results later in the season saw him finish 13th overall.

Corser and Xaus continued with the team for 2010. Corser scored two fifth places at Assen, he took BMW's first ever WSBK podium in race two at Monza, aided by a first-lap collision between Xaus, Jonathan Rea and Toseland. He also took pole at Misano and had scored in every race until being forced to miss Brno following a practice crash.

Corser has been on pole at Philip Island and Valencia four times, equalling a championship record for a single track. Of the eight cases of a rider having 10 or more podium finishes at a particular circuit, Troy has four - 13 at Misano, 11 each at Laguna Seca and Philip Island, and ten at Donington Park.

== Career statistics ==
=== Superbike World Championship ===
==== Races by year ====
(key) (Races in bold indicate pole position, races in italics indicate fastest lap)

Year	Make	1		2		3		4		5		6		7		8		9		10		11		12		13		14		Pos.	Pts
Year	Make	R1	R2	R1	R2	R1	R2	R1	R2	R1	R2	R1	R2	R1	R2	R1	R2	R1	R2	R1	R2	R1	R2	R1	R2	R1	R2	R1	R2	Pos.	Pts
1992	Yamaha	SPA	SPA	GBR	GBR	GER	GER	BEL	BEL	SPA	SPA	AUT	AUT	ITA	ITA	MAL	MAL	JPN	JPN	NED	NED	ITA	ITA	AUS; 18	AUS; 14	NZL; 10	NZL; 10			33rd	14
1994	Ducati	GBR; Ret	GBR; 3	GER	GER	ITA	ITA	SPA	SPA	AUT	AUT	INA	INA	JPN	JPN	NED	NED	SMR; 3	SMR; Ret	EUR; 2	EUR; 2	AUS; 5	AUS; 3							11th	90
1995	Ducati	**GER**; 10	**GER**; 8	SMR; 3	SMR; 3	GBR; 2	GBR; Ret	ITA; Ret	ITA; Ret	**SPA**; 3	**SPA**; 5	AUT; 3	AUT; 1	**USA**; 2	**USA**; 1	EUR; 2	EUR; 6	JPN; 1	JPN; 8	**NED**; 3	**NED**; Ret	INA; 2	INA; 2	AUS; 1	AUS; 3					2nd	339
1996	Ducati	SMR; 2	SMR; 2	**GBR**; 1	**GBR**; 1	GER; Ret	GER; Ret	ITA; 5	ITA; 4	**CZE**; 1	**CZE**; 1	USA; 2	USA; 2	**EUR**; Ret	**EUR**; 1	INA; 6	INA; 5	**JPN**; 4	**JPN**; 9	NED; 4	NED; 2	**SPA**; 1	**SPA**; 1	AUS; 3	AUS; NC					1st	369
1998	Ducati	**AUS**; 2	**AUS**; 6	**GBR**; 2	**GBR**; 2	ITA; 3	ITA; 4	SPA; 2	SPA; 3	**GER**; 7	**GER**; 3	**SMR**; 2	**SMR**; 2	RSA; Ret	RSA; 7	**USA**; 1	**USA**; 2	**EUR**; 7	**EUR**; 1	AUT; 6	AUT; 5	NED; 3	NED; 3	**JPN**; DNS	**JPN**; DNS					3rd	328.5
1999	Ducati	**RSA**; 2	**RSA**; 3	**AUS**; 1	**AUS**; 1	GBR; 6	GBR; 3	SPA; 7	SPA; 6	ITA; 4	ITA; 4	GER; 3	GER; 1	SMR; 2	SMR; 2	**USA**; 6	**USA**; 2	EUR; 5	EUR; 13	AUT; Ret	AUT; 2	**NED**; 2	**NED**; 2	GER; Ret	GER; 7	**JPN**; 8	**JPN**; 14			3rd	361
2000	Aprilia	**RSA**; 4	**RSA**; 3	**AUS**; Ret	**AUS**; 1	JPN; 9	JPN; 5	GBR; 8	GBR; Ret	ITA; 8	ITA; 6	GER; 7	GER; 6	**SMR**; 1	**SMR**; 1	**SPA**; 1	**SPA**; 5	USA; 3	USA; 1	EUR; 6	EUR; Ret	NED; 4	NED; 7	GER; 7	GER; Ret	GBR; 7	GBR; 3			3rd	310
2001	Aprilia	**SPA**; 1	**SPA**; 1	RSA; 3	RSA; 3	**AUS**; 6	**AUS**; C	JPN; 2	JPN; 6	ITA; Ret	ITA; Ret	GBR; 11	GBR; 3	GER; 5	GER; 7	SMR; 7	SMR; 9	USA; 3	USA; 2	EUR; 8	EUR; 13	GER; 9	GER; 11	NED; 6	NED; 3	**ITA**; 2	**ITA**; Ret			4th	284
2003	Petronas	SPA; Ret	SPA; 7	AUS; 5	AUS; 8	JPN; Ret	JPN; 12	ITA; 13	ITA; Ret	GER; 12	GER; 14	GBR; 16	GBR; Ret	SMR; 7	SMR; 10	USA; 8	USA; Ret	GBR; Ret	GBR; Ret	NED; 6	NED; 9	ITA; 7	ITA; 7	FRA; 8	FRA; Ret					12th	107
2004	Petronas	SPA; Ret	SPA; 11	AUS; 13	AUS; 5	SMR; 2	SMR; 7	ITA; 9	ITA; 5	**GER**; 4	**GER**; Ret	GBR; 7	GBR; 9	USA; 10	USA; Ret	EUR; 5	EUR; Ret	NED; 10	NED; 7	ITA; 12	ITA; 10	**FRA**; Ret	**FRA**; 7							9th	146
2005	Suzuki	QAT; 1	QAT; 3	AUS; 1	AUS; 1	**SPA**; 1	**SPA**; 1	ITA; 1	ITA; 3	EUR; 2	EUR; 2	**SMR**; 3	**SMR**; 3	**CZE**; 1	**CZE**; 2	**GBR**; 1	**GBR**; 2	NED; 4	NED; 4	GER; 3	GER; 13	ITA; 2	ITA; C	FRA; 5	FRA; 4					1st	433
2006	Suzuki	QAT; 4	QAT; 1	AUS; 1	AUS; Ret	**SPA**; 2	**SPA**; 2	**ITA**; 3	**ITA**; 2	EUR; Ret	EUR; 6	SMR; Ret	SMR; Ret	CZE; 5	CZE; 4	GBR; 6	GBR; 6	**NED**; Ret	**NED**; Ret	GER; 3	GER; 14	ITA; Ret	ITA; 9	**FRA**; 3	**FRA**; 2					4th	254
2007	Yamaha	**QAT**; 9	**QAT**; 3	AUS; 5	AUS; 5	EUR; 2	EUR; 3	SPA; 4	SPA; 9	NED; 17	NED; 4	ITA; 5	ITA; 6	GBR; 3	GBR; C	**SMR**; 2	**SMR**; 5	CZE; 7	CZE; Ret	GBR; 2	GBR; 3	GER; 3	GER; 5	ITA; Ret	ITA; 4	FRA; 3	FRA; 4			5th	296
2008	Yamaha	**QAT**; 3	**QAT**; 7	AUS; 2	AUS; Ret	SPA; 3	SPA; 5	NED; 5	NED; 10	ITA; 12	ITA; 8	USA; 2	USA; Ret	GER; 4	GER; 2	**SMR**; 2	**SMR**; 5	CZE; 2	CZE; 4	GBR; 8	GBR; 3	EUR; Ret	EUR; 3	ITA; 3	ITA; 3	FRA; 6	FRA; 3	POR; 3	POR; 6	2nd	342
2009	BMW	AUS; 8	AUS; 22	QAT; 9	QAT; 9	SPA; Ret	SPA; 15	NED; 10	NED; 10	ITA; Ret	ITA; DNS	RSA	RSA	USA; 15	USA; 17	SMR; Ret	SMR; 19	GBR; Ret	GBR; 20	CZE; 5	CZE; 10	GER; 8	GER; 6	ITA; 11	ITA; Ret	FRA; 9	FRA; 10	POR; Ret	POR; 9	13th	96
2010	BMW	AUS; 9	AUS; 7	POR; 9	POR; 10	SPA; 4	SPA; 12	NED; 5	NED; 5	ITA; 8	ITA; 3	RSA; 12	RSA; 7	USA; 5	USA; 5	**SMR**; 3	**SMR**; 10	CZE; DNS	CZE; DNS	GBR; 10	GBR; Ret	GER; Ret	GER; 12	ITA; 15	ITA; 11	FRA; Ret	FRA; Ret			11th	165
2011	BMW	AUS; 10	AUS; 19	EUR; 9	EUR; 13	NED; 6	NED; Ret	ITA; 7	ITA; 5	USA; 13	USA; Ret	SMR; Ret	SMR; DNS	SPA; 10	SPA; Ret	CZE	CZE	GBR; 9	GBR; Ret	GER; 15	GER; 12	ITA; 12	ITA; Ret	FRA; 9	FRA; 9	POR; 14	POR; 16			15th	87

Sporting positions
Preceded by Mat Mladin	Australian Superbike Champion; 1993	Succeeded by Anthony Gobert
Preceded by Doug Polen	AMA Superbike Champion; 1994	Succeeded by Miguel Duhamel
Preceded by Carl Fogarty	World Superbike Champion; 1996	Succeeded by John Kocinski
Preceded by James Toseland	World Superbike Champion; 2005	Succeeded by Troy Bayliss
