= Wataru Yoshikawa =

Japanese motorcycle racer

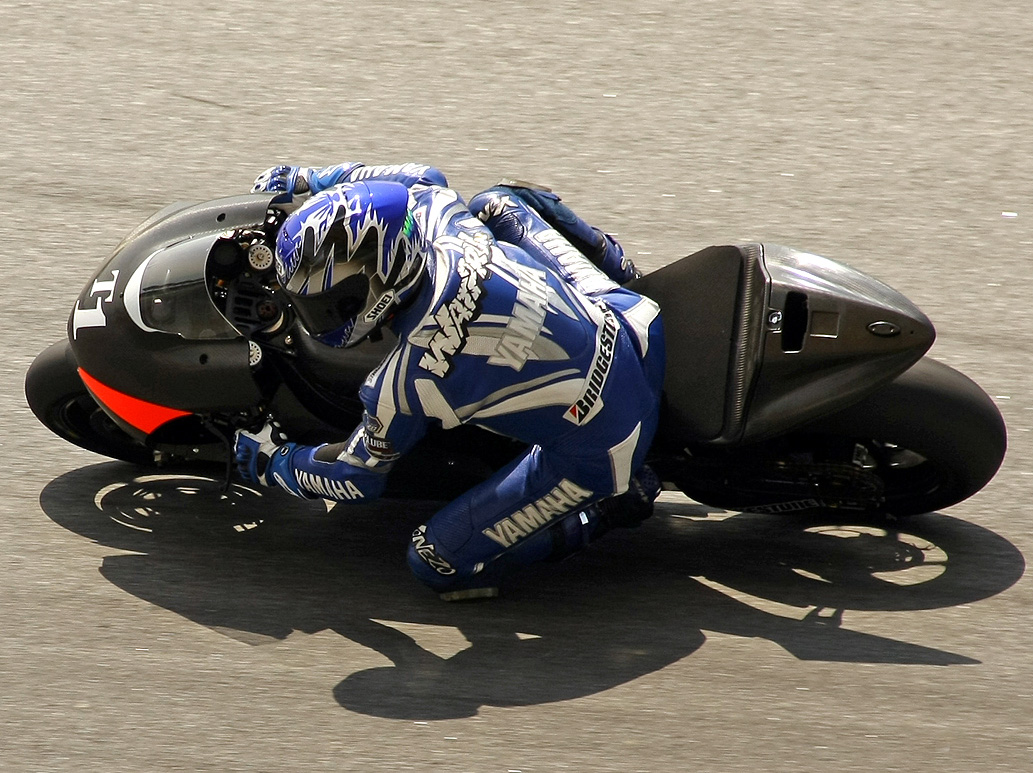
- Yoshikawa testing in 2011
- Nationality: Japanese
- Born: September 26, 1968 (age 58); Tokyo, Japan
Motorcycle racing career statistics
MotoGP World Championship
| Active years | 2002, 2010 |
| Manufacturers | Yamaha |
| Championships | 0 |
| 2010 championship position | 22nd (1 pt) |
Starts / Wins / Podiums / Poles / F. laps / Points; 2 / 0 / 0 / 0 / 0 / 5

Wataru Yoshikawa (吉川 和多留, Yoshikawa Wataru; born September 26, 1968 in Tokyo) is a Japanese motorcycle rider.

Yoshikawa won the All Japan Superbike Championship in 1994 and 1999. He also participated in the World Superbike Championship, finishing ninth in the 1996 season. In 2003, Yoshikawa finished second at the Suzuka 8 Hours, partnering Shinichi Nakatomi on a Yamaha YZF-R1.

Yoshikawa is a test rider for the Yamaha factory, and helped to develop the Yamaha YZR-M1. On June 23, 2010, it was announced that Yoshikawa would replace the injured Valentino Rossi in the MotoGP Yamaha factory works team, until Rossi was again able to race.

Yoshikawa was the team manager of Yamaha's All Japan Road Race Championship factory team at the 39th "Coca-Cola Zero" Suzuka 8 Hours Endurance Road Race held during July 28 to July 31, 2016, at the Suzuka Circuit in Ino, Suzuka City, Mie Prefecture, Japan.

== Career statistics ==
=== Superbike World Championship ===
==== Races by year ====
(key) (Races in bold indicate pole position) (Races in italics indicate fastest lap)

| Year | Bike | 1 | | 2 | | 3 | | 4 | | 5 | | 6 | | 7 | | 8 | | 9 | | 10 | | 11 | | 12 | | 13 | | Pos | Pts |
| Year | Bike | R1 | R2 | R1 | R2 | R1 | R2 | R1 | R2 | R1 | R2 | R1 | R2 | R1 | R2 | R1 | R2 | R1 | R2 | R1 | R2 | R1 | R2 | R1 | R2 | R1 | R2 | Pos | Pts |
|---|---|---|---|---|---|---|---|---|---|---|---|---|---|---|---|---|---|---|---|---|---|---|---|---|---|---|---|---|---|
| 1992 | Yamaha | SPA | SPA | GBR | GBR | GER | GER | BEL | BEL | SPA | SPA | AUT | AUT | ITA | ITA | MAL | MAL | JPN; 25 | JPN; 14 | NED | NED | ITA | ITA | AUS | AUS | NZL | NZL | 65th | 2 |
| 1994 | Yamaha | GBR | GBR | GER | GER | ITA | ITA | SPA | SPA | AUT | AUT | INA | INA | JPN; 5 | JPN; 4 | NED | NED | SMR | SMR | EUR | EUR | AUS | AUS | | | | | 27th | 24 |
| 1995 | Yamaha | GER | GER | SMR | SMR | GBR | GBR | ITA | ITA | SPA | SPA | AUT | AUT | USA | USA | EUR | EUR | JPN; 7 | JPN; 5 | NED | NED | INA | INA | AUS | AUS | | | 25th | 20 |
| 1996 | Yamaha | SMR; 9 | SMR; 11 | GBR; 9 | GBR; 12 | GER; DNS | GER; DNS | ITA | ITA | CZE; 9 | CZE; 11 | USA; 9 | USA; 8 | EUR; 10 | EUR; 6 | INA; 7 | INA; 7 | JPN; 3 | JPN; 8 | NED; 10 | NED; 7 | SPA; 6 | SPA; 5 | AUS; 6 | AUS; 7 | | | 9th | 163 |
| 1997 | Yamaha | AUS | AUS | SMR | SMR | GBR | GBR | GER | GER | ITA | ITA | USA | USA | EUR | EUR | AUT | AUT | NED | NED | SPA | SPA | JPN; 5 | JPN; Ret | INA | INA | | | NC | 0† |
| 1998 | Yamaha | AUS | AUS | GBR | GBR | ITA | ITA | SPA | SPA | GER | GER | SMR | SMR | RSA | RSA | USA | USA | EUR | EUR | AUT | AUT | NED | NED | JPN; 9 | JPN; 7 | | | 24th | 16 |
| 1999 | Yamaha | RSA | RSA | AUS | AUS | GBR | GBR | SPA | SPA | ITA | ITA | GER | GER | SMR | SMR | USA | USA | EUR | EUR | AUT | AUT | NED | NED | GER | GER | JPN; 5 | JPN; 6 | 26th | 21 |
| 2000 | Yamaha | RSA | RSA | AUS | AUS | JPN; 8 | JPN; 2 | GBR | GBR | ITA | ITA | GER | GER | SMR | SMR | SPA | SPA | USA | USA | EUR | EUR | NED | NED | GER; 12 | GER; 9 | GBR | GBR | 24th | 39 |
| 2001 | Yamaha | SPA | SPA | RSA | RSA | AUS | AUS | JPN; 10 | JPN; Ret | ITA | ITA | GBR | GBR | GER | GER | SMR | SMR | USA | USA | EUR | EUR | GER | GER | NED | NED | ITA | ITA | 38th | 6 |
| 2002 | Yamaha | SPA | SPA | AUS | AUS | RSA | RSA | JPN; 8 | JPN; 8 | ITA | ITA | GBR | GBR | GER | GER | SMR | SMR | USA | USA | GBR | GBR | GER | GER | NED | NED | ITA | ITA | 27th | 16 |

^{†} Ineligible for championship points.

=== Grand Prix motorcycle racing ===
==== Races by year ====
(key) (Races in bold indicate pole position, races in italics indicate fastest lap)

| Year | Class | Bike | 1 | 2 | 3 | 4 | 5 | 6 | 7 | 8 | 9 | 10 | 11 | 12 | 13 | 14 | 15 | 16 | 17 | 18 | Pos | Pts |
|---|---|---|---|---|---|---|---|---|---|---|---|---|---|---|---|---|---|---|---|---|---|---|
| 2002 | MotoGP | Yamaha | JPN | RSA | SPA | FRA | ITA | CAT | NED | GBR | GER | CZE | POR | BRA | PAC; 12 | MAL | AUS | VAL | | | 25th | 4 |
| 2010 | MotoGP | Yamaha | QAT | SPA | FRA | ITA | GBR | NED | CAT; 15 | GER | USA | CZE | INP | SMR | ARA | JPN | MAL | AUS | POR | VAL | 22nd | 1 |
