= Superbike World Championship records =

This is a list of records from the Superbike World Championship.

Updated at November 1, 2026.

== Single season records ==
Current Season = *
First season = **

=== Most wins in a single season ===
Rank	Year	Rider	Wins
1	2026	(Italy) Nicolò Bulega	32
2	2023	(Spain) Álvaro Bautista	27
3	2025	(Turkey) Toprak Razgatlıoğlu	21
4	2024	(Turkey) Toprak Razgatlıoğlu	18
5	2019	(United Kingdom) Jonathan Rea	17
	2018	(United Kingdom) Jonathan Rea	17
	1991	(United States) Doug Polen	17
8	2022	(Spain) Álvaro Bautista	16
	2019	(Spain) Álvaro Bautista	16**
	2017	(United Kingdom) Jonathan Rea	16
11	2011	(Spain) Carlos Checa	15
12	2025	(Italy) Nicolò Bulega	14
	2022	(Turkey) Toprak Razgatlıoğlu	14
	2015	(United Kingdom) Jonathan Rea	14
	2009	(United States) Ben Spies	14**
	2002	(Australia) Troy Bayliss	14
17	2021	(Turkey) Toprak Razgatlıoğlu	13
	2021	(United Kingdom) Jonathan Rea	13
	2003	(United Kingdom) Neil Hodgson	13
	1995	(United Kingdom) Carl Fogarty	13
21	2006	(Australia) Troy Bayliss	12
22	2020	(United Kingdom) Jonathan Rea	11
	2016	(United Kingdom) Chaz Davies	11
	2008	(Australia) Troy Bayliss	11
	2002	(United States) Colin Edwards	11
	1999	(United Kingdom) Carl Fogarty	11
	1993	(United Kingdom) Carl Fogarty	11
28	2010	(Italy) Max Biaggi	10
	1994	(United Kingdom) Carl Fogarty	10
30	2016	(United Kingdom) Jonathan Rea	9
	2013	(United Kingdom) Tom Sykes	9
	2013	(Republic of Ireland) Eugene Laverty	9
	1997	(United States) John Kocinski	9
	1994	(United States) Scott Russell	9
	1992	(United States) Doug Polen	9
36	2014	(United Kingdom) Tom Sykes	8
	2009	(Japan) Noriyuki Haga	8
	2007	(United Kingdom) James Toseland	8
	2005	(Australia) Troy Corser	8
	2000	(United States) Colin Edwards	8
	1990	(France) Raymond Roche	8
42	2023	(Turkey) Toprak Razgatlıoğlu	7
	2021	(United Kingdom) Scott Redding	7
	2017	(United Kingdom) Chaz Davies	7
	2008	(Japan) Noriyuki Haga	7
	2007	(Australia) Troy Bayliss	7
	2004	(France) Regis Laconi	7
	2003	(Spain) Ruben Xaus	7
	1996	(Australia) Troy Corser	7
	1993	(Italy) Giancarlo Falappa	7
51	2024	(Italy) Nicolò Bulega	6**
	2022	(United Kingdom) Jonathan Rea	6
	2014	(Italy) Marco Melandri	6
	2012	(Italy) Marco Melandri	6
	2007	(Japan) Noriyuki Haga	6
	2005	(Australia) Chris Vermeulen	6
	2004	(Japan) Noriyuki Haga	6
	2001	(Australia) Troy Bayliss	6
	2001	(United States) Ben Bostrom	6
	1997	(United Kingdom) Carl Fogarty	6
	1992	(France) Raymond Roche	6
62	2020	(United Kingdom) Scott Redding	5
	2016	(United Kingdom) Tom Sykes	5
	2015	(United Kingdom) Chaz Davies	5
	2014	(France) Sylvain Guintoli	5
	2012	(Italy) Max Biaggi	5
	2000	(Australia) Troy Corser	5
	1999	(United States) Colin Edwards	5
	1998	(New Zealand) Aaron Slight	5
	1998	(Italy) Pierfrancesco Chili	5
	1998	(Japan) Noriyuki Haga	5
	1996	(United States) John Kocinski	5**
	1993	(United States) Scott Russell	5
	1990	(Italy) Fabrizio Pirovano	5
	1989	(France) Raymond Roche	5
	1988	(Italy) Davide Tardozzi	5**

=== Most podium finishes in a single season ===
Year	Rider	Races	Podiums
2026	(Italy) Nicolò Bulega	36	36
2019	(United Kingdom) Jonathan Rea	37	34
2023	(Turkey) Toprak Razgatlıoğlu	36	33
2025	(Italy) Nicolò Bulega	36	32
2025	(Turkey) Toprak Razgatlıoğlu	36	31
2023	(Spain) Álvaro Bautista	36	31
2022	(Spain) Álvaro Bautista	36	31
2022	(United Kingdom) Jonathan Rea	36	30
2021	(United Kingdom) Jonathan Rea	37	30
2022	(Turkey) Toprak Razgatlıoğlu	36	29
2021	(Turkey) Toprak Razgatlıoğlu	37	29
2024	(Turkey) Toprak Razgatlıoğlu	30	27
2002	(United States) Colin Edwards	26	25
2024	(Italy) Nicolò Bulega	36	24**
2019	(Spain) Álvaro Bautista	36	24**
2017	(United Kingdom) Jonathan Rea	26	24
2021	(United Kingdom) Scott Redding	37	23
2016	(United Kingdom) Jonathan Rea	26	23
2015	(United Kingdom) Jonathan Rea	26	23
2018	(United Kingdom) Jonathan Rea	25	22
2002	(Australia) Troy Bayliss	26	22
2025	(Spain) Álvaro Bautista	36	21
2011	(Spain) Carlos Checa	26	21
1991	(United States) Doug Polen	24	21
2016	(United Kingdom) Tom Sykes	26	20
2003	(United Kingdom) Neil Hodgson	24	20
2013	(Republic of Ireland) Eugene Laverty	27	19
2009	(Japan) Noriyuki Haga	28	19
2008	(Australia) Troy Bayliss	28	19
1999	(United Kingdom) Carl Fogarty	26	19
1995	(United Kingdom) Carl Fogarty	24	19
2024	(Spain) Álvaro Bautista	35	18
2023	(United Kingdom) Jonathan Rea	32	18
2017	(United Kingdom) Chaz Davies	25	18
2015	(United Kingdom) Chaz Davies	26	18
2013	(United Kingdom) Tom Sykes	27	18
2005	(Australia) Troy Corser	23	18
1993	(United States) Scott Russell	26	18
2020	(United Kingdom) Jonathan Rea	24	17
2016	(United Kingdom) Chaz Davies	26	17
2009	(United States) Ben Spies	28	17**
2007	(Italy) Max Biaggi	25	17
1997	(United States) John Kocinski	24	17
1990	(France) Raymond Roche	26	17
2017	(United Kingdom) Tom Sykes	24	16
2014	(United Kingdom) Tom Sykes	24	16
	(France) Sylvain Guintoli	24	16
2006	(Australia) Troy Bayliss	24	16
2015	(United Kingdom) Tom Sykes	26	15
2011	(Italy) Marco Melandri	26	15
2009	(Italy) Michel Fabrizio	28	15
2007	(Japan) Noriyuki Haga	25	15
2003	(Spain) Ruben Xaus	24	15
2001	(Australia) Troy Bayliss	24	15
1997	(United Kingdom) Carl Fogarty	24	15
1995	(Australia) Troy Corser	24	15
1993	(United Kingdom) Carl Fogarty	25	15
1992	(United States) Doug Polen	26	15
1991	(France) Raymond Roche	20	15
2020	(United Kingdom) Scott Redding	24	14
2013	(France) Sylvain Guintoli	27	14
2010	(Italy) Max Biaggi	26	14
	(United Kingdom) Leon Haslam	26	14
2007	(United Kingdom) James Toseland	25	14
2005	(Australia) Chris Vermeulen	23	14
2004	(United Kingdom) James Toseland	22	14
	(France) Régis Laconi	22	14
1998	(Australia) Troy Corser	22	14
	(United Kingdom) Carl Fogarty	24	14
1994	(United Kingdom) Carl Fogarty	20	14
1992	(France) Raymond Roche	26	14
2019	(Turkey) Toprak Razgatlıoğlu	37	13
2017	(Italy) Marco Melandri	26	13
2012	(United Kingdom) Tom Sykes	27	13
2008	(Australia) Troy Corser	28	13
2007	(Australia) Troy Bayliss	24	13
1999	(Australia) Troy Corser	26	13
1996	(Australia) Troy Corser	24	13
	(New Zealand) Aaron Slight	24	13
1994	(United States) Scott Russell	22	13
1990	(Belgium) Stéphane Mertens	26	13
2024	(United Kingdom) Alex Lowes	35	12
2018	(United Kingdom) Chaz Davies	25	12
2013	(Italy) Marco Melandri	27	12
2011	(Italy) Max Biaggi	21	12
2006	(United Kingdom) James Toseland	24	12
2001	(United States) Colin Edwards	25	12
2000	(United States) Colin Edwards	26	12
1999	(New Zealand) Aaron Slight	26	12
1996	(United States) John Kocinski	24	12
2014	(Italy) Marco Melandri	24	11
2012	(Italy) Marco Melandri	26	11
	(Italy) Max Biaggi	27	11
2008	(Japan) Noriyuki Haga	28	11
2006	(Japan) Noriyuki Haga	24	11
2000	(Japan) Noriyuki Haga	24	11
1997	(New Zealand) Aaron Slight	24	11
1995	(New Zealand) Aaron Slight	24	11
1989	(France) Raymond Roche	22	11
2024	(Italy) Danilo Petrucci	33	10
2019	(United Kingdom) Chaz Davies	36	10
2018	(Italy) Marco Melandri	25	10
	(Netherlands) Michael van der Mark	25	10
2010	(United Kingdom) Jonathan Rea	23	10
	(United Kingdom) Cal Crutchlow	26	10
2005	(Japan) Noriyuki Haga	23	10
2002	(Spain) Ruben Xaus	26	10
2001	(Australia) Troy Corser	25	10
2000	(Italy) Pierfrancesco Chili	26	10
1999	(United States) Colin Edwards	26	10
1998	(New Zealand) Aaron Slight	23	10
	(Italy) Pierfrancesco Chili	24	10
1994	(New Zealand) Aaron Slight	22	10
1993	(New Zealand) Aaron Slight	26	10
	(Italy) Giancarlo Falappa	26	10
	(Italy) Fabrizio Pirovano	26	10
1990	(Italy) Fabrizio Pirovano	26	10

=== Most pole positions in a single season ===
Rank	Year	Rider	Poles
1	2009	(United States) Ben Spies	11**
	2026	(Italy) Nicolò Bulega	11
2	1991	(United States) Doug Polen	10
3	2012	(United Kingdom) Tom Sykes	9
4	2021	(United Kingdom) Jonathan Rea	8
	2016	(United Kingdom) Tom Sykes	8
	2013	(United Kingdom) Tom Sykes	8
	2008	(Australia) Troy Bayliss	8
8	2019	(United Kingdom) Jonathan Rea	7
	1998	(Australia) Troy Corser	7
10	2025	(Turkey) Toprak Razgatlıoğlu	6
	2024	(Turkey) Toprak Razgatlıoğlu	6
	2018	(United Kingdom) Tom Sykes	6
	2017	(United Kingdom) Jonathan Rea	6
	2015	(United Kingdom) Tom Sykes	6
	2011	(Spain) Carlos Checa	6
	2010	(United Kingdom) Cal Crutchlow	6
	2007	(Australia) Troy Bayliss	6
	2003	(United Kingdom) Neil Hodgson	6
	2000	(United States) Colin Edwards	6
	1994	(United Kingdom) Carl Fogarty	6
	1993	(United Kingdom) Carl Fogarty	6
	1992	(United States) Doug Polen	6
23	2025	(Italy) Nicolò Bulega	5
	2022	(United Kingdom) Jonathan Rea	5
	2014	(United Kingdom) Tom Sykes	5
	2006	(Australia) Troy Bayliss	5
	2004	(France) Regis Laconi	5
	2002	(United States) Colin Edwards	5
	1999	(Australia) Troy Corser	5
	1996	(Australia) Troy Corser	5
31	2024	(Italy) Nicolò Bulega	4**
	2023	(Turkey) Toprak Razgatlıoğlu	4
	2023	(Spain) Álvaro Bautista	4
	2022	(Turkey) Toprak Razgatlıoğlu	4
	2020	(United Kingdom) Jonathan Rea	4
	2019	(Spain) Álvaro Bautista	4**
	2017	(United Kingdom) Tom Sykes	4
	2006	(Australia) Troy Corser	4
	2005	(Australia) Troy Corser	4
	2002	(Australia) Troy Bayliss	4
	2001	(United Kingdom) Neil Hodgson	4
	2000	(Australia) Troy Corser	4
	1999	(United Kingdom) Carl Fogarty	4
	1995	(United Kingdom) Carl Fogarty	4
	1995	(Australia) Troy Corser	4
	1993	(United States) Scott Russell	4
	1992	(Italy) Giancarlo Falappa	4
	1989	(United States) Fred Merkel	4
	1989	(France) Raymond Roche	4

=== Most fastest laps in a single season ===
Rank	Year	Rider	Fast laps
1	2026	(Italy) Nicolò Bulega	31
2	2023	(Spain) Alvaro Bautista	23
3	2025	(Turkey) Toprak Razgatlıoğlu	20
4	2019	(Spain) Alvaro Bautista	15
5	2024	(Italy) Nicolò Bulega	14
5	2015	(United Kingdom) Jonathan Rea	14
5	2017	(United Kingdom) Jonathan Rea	14
5	2021	(United Kingdom) Jonathan Rea	14
5	1991	(United States) Doug Polen	14
10	2024	(Turkey) Toprak Razgatlıoğlu	13
10	2022	(Turkey) Toprak Razgatlıoğlu	13
10	2022	(Spain) Alvaro Bautista	13
10	2013	(United Kingdom) Tom Sykes	13
14	2019	(United Kingdom) Jonathan Rea	12
14	2007	(Japan) Noriyuki Haga	12
16	2024	(Italy) Nicolò Bulega	11
16	2020	(United Kingdom) Jonathan Rea	11
16	2015	(United Kingdom) Jonathan Rea	11
19	2016	(United Kingdom) Chaz Davies	10
19	2011	(Spain) Carlos Checa	10
19	2009	(Japan) Noriyuki Haga	10
19	2006	(Australia) Troy Bayliss	10
19	2003	(United Kingdom) Neil Hodgson	10
19	1994	(United Kingdom) Carl Fogarty	10
19	1993	(United Kingdom) Carl Fogarty	10
26	2021	(Turkey) Toprak Razgatlıoğlu	9
26	2021	(United Kingdom) Scott Redding	9
26	2002	(Australia) Troy Bayliss	9
26	1996	(Australia) Troy Corser	9
26	1995	(United Kingdom) Carl Fogarty	9
26	1990	(France) Raymond Roche	9
32	2022	(United Kingdom) Jonathan Rea	8
32	2012	(Spain) Carlos Checa	8
32	2010	(United Kingdom) Cal Crutchlow	8
32	2008	(Australia) Troy Bayliss	8
32	2002	(United States) Colin Edwards	8
32	1998	(New Zealand) Aaron Slight	8
38	2023	(Turkey) Toprak Razgatlıoğlu	7
38	2015	(United Kingdom) Tom Sykes	7
38	2010	(Spain) Carlos Checa	7
38	2005	(Australia) Troy Corser	7
38	2004	(Japan) Noriyuki Haga	7
38	1999	(United Kingdom) Carl Fogarty	7
38	1997	(United States) John Kocinski	7
38	1993	(Italy) Giancarlo Falappa	7
46	2016	(United Kingdom) Jonathan Rea	6
46	2016	(United Kingdom) Tom Sykes	6
46	2014	(France) Sylvain Guintoli	6
46	2012	(Spain) Carlos Checa	6
46	2009	(United States) Ben Spies	6
46	2009	(Italy) Michel Fabrizio	6
46	2005	(Japan) Noriyuki Haga	6
46	2004	(France) Regis Laconi	6
46	2000	(United States) Colin Edwards	6
46	1999	(Australia) Troy Corser	6
46	1992	(Italy) Fabrizio Pirovano	6
46	1989	(France) Raymond Roche	6
58	2018	(Italy) Marco Melandri	5
58	2017	(United Kingdom) Chaz Davies	5
58	2015	(United Kingdom) Chaz Davies	5
58	2012	(Italy) Max Biaggi	5
58	2011	(Italy) Max Biaggi	5
58	2010	(United Kingdom) Jonathan Rea	5
58	2008	(Japan) Noriyuki Haga	5
58	2008	(Spain) Carlos Checa	5
58	2007	(Italy) Max Biaggi	5
58	2003	(Spain) Ruben Xaus	5
58	1998	(Italy) Pierfrancesco Chili	5
58	1997	(Italy) Pierfrancesco Chili	5
58	1994	(United States) Scott Russell	5
58	1992	(France) Raymond Roche	5

=== Riders who won in their first season or as a wildcard in their first race ===
Year	Rider	Wins
2019	(Spain) Alvaro Bautista	16
2009	(United States) Ben Spies	14
2024	(Italy) Nicolò Bulega	6
1988	(Italy) Davide Tardozzi	5
1996	(United States) John Kocinski	5
2004	(Australia) Chris Vermeulen	4
2011	(Italy) Marco Melandri	4
1988	(Australia) Mick Doohan	3
1989	(Italy) Giancarlo Falappa	3
2007	(Italy) Max Biaggi	3
2008	(Japan) Ryuichi Kiyonari	3
2010	(United Kingdom) Cal Crutchlow	3
1988	(United States) Fred Merkel	2
1988	(Italy) Marco Lucchinelli	2
1988	(Belgium) Stéphane Mertens	2
1990	(United States) Doug Chandler	2
1997	(Japan) Akira Yanagawa	2
2000	(Japan) Hitoyasu Izutsu	2
2001	(Spain) Rubén Xaus	2
2005	(Italy) Lorenzo Lanzi	2
2008	(United Kingdom) Jonathan Rea	2
2008	(Spain) Carlos Checa	2
2011	(Republic of Ireland) Eugene Laverty	2
1988	(Italy) Fabrizio Pirovano	1
1988	(France) Adrien Morillas	1
1988	(Canada) Gary Goodfellow	1
1989	(Australia) Peter Goddard	1
1989	(United States) Doug Polen	1
1991	(Australia) Kevin Magee	1
1991	(United States) Tom Kipp	1
1991	(Canada) Pascal Picotte	1
1994	(Australia) Anthony Gobert	1
1995	(Italy) Pierfrancesco Chili	1
1996	(Japan) Yuichi Takeda	1
2015	(Spain) Jordi Torres	1
2001	(France) Régis Laconi	1
2004	(Australia) Garry McCoy	1
2006	(Brazil) Alex Barros	1
2012	(France) Loris Baz	1
2012	(United Kingdom) Chaz Davies	1
2016	(United States) Nicky Hayden	1
