= 1998 Superbike World Championship =

1998 Superbike World Championship
Previous:	1997	Next:	1999
Support series: Supersport World Series

The 1998 Superbike World Championship was the eleventh FIM Superbike World Championship season. The season started on 22 March at Phillip Island and finished on 4 October at Sugo after 12 rounds.

The season saw the introduction of a revised qualifying system: after two timed qualifying sessions, the sixteen fastest riders were admitted to the newly created Superpole, which determined the first four rows of the starting grid; during this session each rider went on the track in reverse qualifying order to take a single flying lap.

Carl Fogarty, who amassed three race victories during the season, won the riders' championship for the third time after 1994 and 1995; Fogarty prevailed over Aaron Slight at the last round, while Troy Corser, who had entered the final event leading the standings, could not race due to injury. Ducati won the manufacturers' championship.

This season also saw the round at Sentul being dropped from the 1998 calendar due to the 1997 Asian financial crisis.

== Race calendar and results ==
1998 Superbike World Championship Calendar
Round		Circuit	Date	Superpole	Fastest lap	Winning rider	Winning team	Report
1	R1	(Australia) Phillip Island	22 March	(Australia) Troy Corser	(United Kingdom) Carl Fogarty	(United Kingdom) Carl Fogarty	Ducati Performance	Report
1	R2	(Australia) Phillip Island	22 March	(Australia) Troy Corser	(New Zealand) Aaron Slight	(Japan) Noriyuki Haga	Yamaha World Superbike Team	Report
2	R1	(United Kingdom) Donington	13 April	(Australia) Troy Corser (Note: Superpole abandoned due to snow; grid established from the two qualifying sessions.)	(Japan) Noriyuki Haga	(Japan) Noriyuki Haga	Yamaha World Superbike Team	Report
2	R2	(United Kingdom) Donington	13 April	(Australia) Troy Corser	(Japan) Noriyuki Haga	(Japan) Noriyuki Haga	Yamaha World Superbike Team	Report
3	R1	(Italy) Monza	10 May	(New Zealand) Aaron Slight	(New Zealand) Aaron Slight	(United States) Colin Edwards	Castrol Honda	Report
3	R2	(Italy) Monza	10 May	(New Zealand) Aaron Slight	(New Zealand) Aaron Slight	(United States) Colin Edwards	Castrol Honda	Report
4	R1	(Spain) Albacete	24 May	(Japan) Noriyuki Haga	(Italy) Pierfrancesco Chili	(Italy) Pierfrancesco Chili	Ducati ADVF	Report
4	R2	(Spain) Albacete	24 May	(Japan) Noriyuki Haga	(New Zealand) Aaron Slight	(United Kingdom) Carl Fogarty	Ducati Performance	Report
5	R1	(Germany) Nürburgring	7 June	(Australia) Troy Corser	(New Zealand) Aaron Slight	(New Zealand) Aaron Slight	Castrol Honda	Report
5	R2	(Germany) Nürburgring	7 June	(Australia) Troy Corser	(Italy) Pierfrancesco Chili	(Italy) Pierfrancesco Chili	Ducati ADVF	Report
6	R1	(San Marino) Misano	21 June	(Australia) Troy Corser	(New Zealand) Aaron Slight	(New Zealand) Aaron Slight	Castrol Honda	Report
6	R2	(San Marino) Misano	21 June	(Australia) Troy Corser	(New Zealand) Aaron Slight	(New Zealand) Aaron Slight	Castrol Honda	Report
7	R1	(South Africa) Kyalami	5 July	(Italy) Pierfrancesco Chili	(Italy) Pierfrancesco Chili	(Italy) Pierfrancesco Chili	Ducati ADVF	Report
7	R2	(South Africa) Kyalami	5 July	(Italy) Pierfrancesco Chili	(Japan) Akira Yanagawa	(Italy) Pierfrancesco Chili	Ducati ADVF	Report
8	R1	(United States) Laguna Seca	12 July	(Australia) Troy Corser	(Australia) Troy Corser	(Australia) Troy Corser	Ducati ADVF	Report
8	R2	(United States) Laguna Seca	12 July	(Australia) Troy Corser	(Japan) Noriyuki Haga	(Japan) Noriyuki Haga	Yamaha World Superbike Team	Report
9	R1	(Europe) Brands Hatch	2 August	(Australia) Troy Corser	(New Zealand) Aaron Slight	(United States) Colin Edwards	Castrol Honda	Report
9	R2	(Europe) Brands Hatch	2 August	(Australia) Troy Corser	(United Kingdom) Jamie Whitham	(Australia) Troy Corser	Ducati ADVF	Report
10	R1	(Austria) A1-Ring	30 August	(New Zealand) Aaron Slight	(Italy) Pierfrancesco Chili	(New Zealand) Aaron Slight	Castrol Honda	Report
10	R2	(Austria) A1-Ring	30 August	(New Zealand) Aaron Slight	(Australia) Troy Corser	(New Zealand) Aaron Slight	Castrol Honda	Report
11	R1	(Netherlands) Assen	6 September	(Italy) Pierfrancesco Chili	(Italy) Pierfrancesco Chili	(Italy) Pierfrancesco Chili	Ducati ADVF	Report
11	R2	(Netherlands) Assen	6 September	(Italy) Pierfrancesco Chili	(United Kingdom) Carl Fogarty	(United Kingdom) Carl Fogarty	Ducati Performance	Report
12	R1	(Japan) Sugo	4 October	(Australia) Troy Corser	(Japan) Akira Ryō	(Japan) Keiichi Kitagawa	Team Suzuki	Report
12	R2	(Japan) Sugo	4 October	(Australia) Troy Corser	(Japan) Noriyuki Haga	(Japan) Noriyuki Haga	Yamaha World Superbike Team	Report

Footnotes

== Championship standings ==
=== Riders' standings ===
1998 final riders' standings
Pos.	Rider	Bike	AUS (Australia)		GBR (United Kingdom)		ITA (Italy)		ESP (Spain)		GER (Germany)		SMR (San Marino)		RSA (South Africa)		USA (United States)		EUR (Europe)		AUT (Austria)		NED (Netherlands)		JPN (Japan)		Pts
Pos.	Rider	Bike	R1	R2	R1	R2	R1	R2	R1	R2	R1	R2	R1	R2	R1	R2	R1^{‡}	R2	R1	R2	R1	R2	R1	R2	R1	R2	Pts
1	(United Kingdom) Carl Fogarty	Ducati	1	3	7	3	6	2	9	1	13	13	4	3	2	2	5	Ret	4	2	3	2	2	1	3	4	351.5
2	(New Zealand) Aaron Slight	Honda	9	2	4	4	**2**	**Ret**	4	2	1	4	1	1	8	8	8	DNS	2	5	**1**	**1**	4	2	7	6	347
3	(Australia) Troy Corser	Ducati	**2**	**6**	**2**	**2**	3	4	2	3	**7**	**3**	**2**	**2**	Ret	7	**1**	**2**	**7**	**1**	6	5	3	3	**DNS**	**DNS**	328.5
4	(Italy) Pierfrancesco Chili	Ducati	4	Ret	3	5	5	3	1	5	3	1	Ret	Ret	**1**	**1**	7	4	9	6	2	3	**1**	**Ret**	12	Ret	293.5
5	(United States) Colin Edwards	Honda	7	7	6	7	1	1	5	Ret	2	2	3	4	9	4	11	10	1	4	7	9	5	4	13	13	279.5
6	(Japan) Noriyuki Haga	Yamaha	3	1	1	1	9	10	**10**	**4**	5	7	Ret	Ret	7	3	Ret	1	12	7	9	12	8	8	Ret	1	258
7	(Japan) Akira Yanagawa	Kawasaki	5	5	5	16	Ret	6	13	7	4	5	5	5	6	5	2	DNS			4	4	7	6	4	2	210
8	(United Kingdom) James Whitham	Suzuki	Ret	12	8	8	8	5	11	10	9	10	6	Ret	4	Ret	6	5	5	3	5	6	Ret	5	11	9	173
9	(Australia) Peter Goddard	Suzuki	Ret	4	9	10	7	8	14	8	6	8	Ret	Ret	5	6	14	8	10	13	10	8	6	7	10	10	155
10	(United States) Scott Russell	Yamaha	10	8	13	11	Ret	Ret	6	9	11	Ret	8	6	10	9	15	Ret	3	8	12	11	9	Ret	5	12	130.5
11	(United Kingdom) Neil Hodgson	Kawasaki	8	Ret	12	Ret	4	7	7	14	Ret	11	7	8	Ret	Ret	9	6	Ret	9	8	10	10	9	6	16	124.5
12	(Spain) Gregorio Lavilla	Ducati	11	11	Ret	Ret	10	Ret	3	Ret	Ret	6	Ret	7	3	Ret	13	Ret	Ret	Ret	11	7	Ret	Ret	17	15	83.5
13	(Italy) Piergiorgio Bontempi	Kawasaki	12	Ret	14	13	Ret	11	12	6	8	9	Ret	11	12	10	18	DNS									58
14	(Italy) Alessandro Gramigni	Ducati	18	15	18	17	12	13	8	Ret	10	Ret	11	12	11	14	16	9	15	Ret	13	14	11	Ret			56
15	(Slovenia) Igor Jerman	Kawasaki	15	Ret	21	19	13	12	Ret	12	14	15	15	10	13	11	19	11	DNS	DNS	15	15	12	10	20	18	47
16	(Japan) Keiichi Kitagawa	Suzuki																							1	5	36
17	(Japan) Akira Ryō	Suzuki																							2	3	36
18	(Austria) Andreas Meklau	Ducati					11	9			Ret	Ret	9	9							14	13					31
19	(United Kingdom) Niall Mackenzie	Yamaha			Ret	6													6	10							26
20	(United Kingdom) Steve Hislop	Yamaha			10	9													8	11							26
21	(Italy) Lucio Pedercini	Ducati	13	Ret	19	20	14	14			12	14	12	14	Ret	13	20	12			16	Ret	DNS	DNS			26
22	(United States) Ben Bostrom	Honda															4	3									22.5
23	(Australia) Mark Willis	Suzuki	6	9																							17
24	(Japan) Wataru Yoshikawa	Yamaha																							9	7	16
25	(Germany) Udo Mark	Suzuki					Ret	12					10	13													13
26	(New Zealand) Andrew Stroud	Kawasaki	17	16	22	Ret	DNS	DNS	18	16	16	Ret	14	15	14	12	Ret	Ret	16	17	Ret	DNS	15	13	21	20	13
27	(United States) Jamie Hacking	Yamaha															10	7									12
28	(United Kingdom) Chris Walker	Kawasaki			11	12																					9
29	(Finland) Erkka Korpiaho	Kawasaki					15	15	15	Ret											17	16	14	12			9
30	(Japan) Kensuke Haga	Yamaha																							Ret	8	8
31	(Japan) Shinichi Ito	Honda																							8	Ret	8
32	(United States) Doug Chandler	Kawasaki															3	DNS									8
33	(Italy) Mario Innamorati	Kawasaki																			18	Ret	13	11	19	19	8
34	(Japan) Shinya Takeishi	Kawasaki																							14	11	7
35	(United Kingdom) James Haydon	Suzuki			15	14													Ret	12							7
36	(Australia) Steve Martin	Ducati	Ret	10																							6
37	(United Kingdom) Sean Emmett	Ducati			Ret	Ret													11	Ret							5
38	(France) Jean-Marc Delétang	Yamaha	Ret	22	Ret	22	19	19	16	11	Ret	Ret	16	Ret													5
39	(France) Frédéric Protat	Honda	21	19	Ret	23	16	16																			5
39	(France) Frédéric Protat	Ducati							19	13	DNS	DNS	18	17	15	15	23	Ret	17	19	Ret	Ret	Ret	DNS			5
40	(Australia) Troy Bayliss	Ducati			Ret	Ret													13	15							4
41	(United States) Ricky Orlando	Kawasaki															22	13									3
42	(Italy) Paolo Blora	Ducati					17	17					13	16													3
43	(Australia) Shawn Giles	Honda	16	13																							3
44	(Japan) Yuichi Takeda	Honda																							15	14	3
45	(Germany) Heinz Platacis	Kawasaki																					16	14			2
46	(United Kingdom) John Reynolds	Ducati																	Ret	14							2
47	(United Kingdom) Matt Llewellyn	Ducati																	14	Ret							2
48	(United States) Aaron Yates	Suzuki															12	Ret									2
49	(Australia) Craig Connell	Ducati	Ret	14																							2
50	(Australia) Malcolm Campbell	Ducati	14	Ret																							2
51	(Spain) Rubén Xaus	Suzuki									15	16															1
52	(Czech Republic) Jiří Mrkývka	Honda	Ret	24	DNQ	DNQ	20	Ret	17	15	18	18	Ret	18					Ret	20	21	Ret	DNQ	DNQ	Ret	Ret	1
53	(United Kingdom) Terry Rymer	Suzuki			16	15													Ret	16							1
Pos.	Rider	Bike	AUS (Australia)		GBR (United Kingdom)		ITA (Italy)		ESP (Spain)		GER (Germany)		SMR (San Marino)		RSA (South Africa)		USA (United States)		EUR (Europe)		AUT (Austria)		NED (Netherlands)		JPN (Japan)		Pts

Colour	Result
Gold	Winner
Silver	Second place
Bronze	Third place
Green	Points classification
Blue	Non-points classification
Blue	Non-classified finish (NC)
Purple	Retired, not classified (Ret)
Red	Did not qualify (DNQ)
Red	Did not pre-qualify (DNPQ)
Black	Disqualified (DSQ)
White	Did not start (DNS)
White	Withdrew (WD)
White	Race cancelled (C)
Blank	Did not practice (DNP)
Blank	Did not arrive (DNA)
Blank	Excluded (EX)

**Bold** – Pole position
Italics – Fastest lap

^{‡} Due to separate accidents, the first race in Laguna Seca was stopped on the 13th of the 28 scheduled laps and the subsequent restart was aborted; half points were awarded.

=== Manufacturers' standings ===
1998 final manufacturers' standings
Pos.	Manufacturer	AUS (Australia)		GBR (United Kingdom)		ITA (Italy)		ESP (Spain)		GER (Germany)		SMR (San Marino)		RSA (South Africa)		USA (United States)		EUR (Europe)		AUT (Austria)		NED (Netherlands)		JPN (Japan)		Pts
Pos.	Manufacturer	R1	R2	R1	R2	R1	R2	R1	R2	R1	R2	R1	R2	R1	R2	R1^{‡}	R2	R1	R2	R1	R2	R1	R2	R1	R2	Pts
1	(Italy) Ducati	1	3	2	2	3	2	1	1	3	1	2	2	1	1	1	2	4	1	2	2	1	1	3	4	487.5
2	(Japan) Honda	7	2	4	4	1	1	4	2	1	2	1	1	8	4	4	3	1	4	1	1	4	2	7	6	416.5
3	(Japan) Yamaha	3	1	1	1	9	10	6	4	5	7	8	6	7	3	10	1	3	7	9	11	8	8	5	1	307
4	(Japan) Suzuki	6	4	8	8	7	5	11	8	6	8	6	13	4	6	6	5	5	3	5	6	6	5	1	3	252
5	(Japan) Kawasaki	5	5	5	12	4	6	7	6	4	5	5	5	6	5	2	6	16	9	4	4	7	6	4	2	251
Pos.	Manufacturer	AUS (Australia)		GBR (United Kingdom)		ITA (Italy)		ESP (Spain)		GER (Germany)		SMR (San Marino)		RSA (South Africa)		USA (United States)		EUR (Europe)		AUT (Austria)		NED (Netherlands)		JPN (Japan)		Pts

^{‡} Due to separate accidents, the first race in Laguna Seca was stopped on the 13th of the 28 scheduled laps and the subsequent restart was aborted; half points were awarded.
