= 1993 Superbike World Championship =

1993 Superbike World Championship
Previous:	1992	Next:	1994

The 1993 Superbike World Championship was the sixth FIM Superbike World Championship season. The season started on 9 April at Brands Hatch; the fourteenth and last round, which was due to be held on the weekend of 7 November in Mexico City, was cancelled on Saturday as a result of track safety issues.

Scott Russell won the riders' championship with 5 victories and Ducati won the manufacturers' championship.

== Race calendar and results ==
1993 Superbike World Championship Calendar
Round		Country	Circuit	Date	Pole position	Fastest lap	Winning rider	Winning team	Report
1	R1	(Republic of Ireland) Ireland (Note: Event labelled as Irish Round but held in the United Kingdom.)	Brands Hatch	9 April	(United States) Scott Russell	(Italy) Giancarlo Falappa	(Italy) Giancarlo Falappa	Team Raymond Roche Ducati	Report
1	R2	(Republic of Ireland) Ireland	Brands Hatch	9 April	(United States) Scott Russell	(Italy) Giancarlo Falappa	(Italy) Giancarlo Falappa	Team Raymond Roche Ducati	Report
2	R1	Germany	Hockenheim	9 May	(United States) Scott Russell	(Italy) Giancarlo Falappa	(Italy) Giancarlo Falappa	Team Raymond Roche Ducati	Report
2	R2	Germany	Hockenheim	9 May	(United States) Scott Russell	(New Zealand) Aaron Slight	(United States) Scott Russell	Team Kawasaki Muzzy	Report
3	R1	Spain	Albacete	29 May	(New Zealand) Aaron Slight	(New Zealand) Aaron Slight	(United Kingdom) Carl Fogarty	Team Raymond Roche Ducati	Report
3	R2	Spain	Albacete	29 May	(New Zealand) Aaron Slight	(United Kingdom) Carl Fogarty	(United Kingdom) Carl Fogarty	Team Raymond Roche Ducati	Report
4	R1	San Marino (Note: Event labelled as San Marino Round but held in Italy.)	Misano	27 June	(Italy) Giancarlo Falappa	(Italy) Giancarlo Falappa	(Italy) Giancarlo Falappa	Team Raymond Roche Ducati	Report
4	R2	San Marino	Misano	27 June	(Italy) Giancarlo Falappa	(Italy) Giancarlo Falappa	(Italy) Giancarlo Falappa	Team Raymond Roche Ducati	Report
5	R1	Austria	Österreichring	11 July	(United States) Scott Russell	(Austria) Andreas Meklau	(Austria) Andreas Meklau	Team Ducati Schnyder	Report
5	R2	Austria	Österreichring	11 July	(United States) Scott Russell	(Italy) Giancarlo Falappa	(Italy) Giancarlo Falappa	Team Raymond Roche Ducati	Report
6	R1	Czech Republic	Brno	18 July	(United Kingdom) Carl Fogarty	(United Kingdom) Carl Fogarty	(United Kingdom) Carl Fogarty	Team Raymond Roche Ducati	Report
6	R2	Czech Republic	Brno	18 July	(United Kingdom) Carl Fogarty	(United Kingdom) Carl Fogarty	(United States) Scott Russell	Team Kawasaki Muzzy	Report
7	R1	Sweden	Anderstorp	8 August	(United Kingdom) Carl Fogarty	(United Kingdom) Carl Fogarty	(United Kingdom) Carl Fogarty	Team Raymond Roche Ducati	Report
7	R2	Sweden	Anderstorp	8 August	(United Kingdom) Carl Fogarty	(United Kingdom) Carl Fogarty	(United Kingdom) Carl Fogarty	Team Raymond Roche Ducati	Report
8	R1	Malaysia	Johor	22 August	(United Kingdom) Carl Fogarty	(United Kingdom) Carl Fogarty	(United Kingdom) Carl Fogarty	Team Raymond Roche Ducati	Report
8	R2	Malaysia	Johor	22 August	(United Kingdom) Carl Fogarty	(United States) Scott Russell	(United Kingdom) Carl Fogarty	Team Raymond Roche Ducati	Report
9	R1	Japan	Sugo	28 August	(United Kingdom) Carl Fogarty	(Japan) Keiichi Kitagawa	(United Kingdom) Carl Fogarty	Team Raymond Roche Ducati	Report
9	R2	Japan	Sugo	28 August	(United Kingdom) Carl Fogarty	(United Kingdom) Carl Fogarty	(United States) Scott Russell	Team Kawasaki Muzzy	Report
10	R1	Netherlands	Assen	12 September	(United Kingdom) Carl Fogarty	(United States) Scott Russell	(United Kingdom) Carl Fogarty	Team Raymond Roche Ducati	Report
10	R2	Netherlands	Assen	12 September	(United Kingdom) Carl Fogarty	(United Kingdom) Carl Fogarty	(United Kingdom) Carl Fogarty	Team Raymond Roche Ducati	Report
11	R1	Italy	Monza	26 September	(United States) Scott Russell	(Italy) Giancarlo Falappa	(New Zealand) Aaron Slight	Team Kawasaki Muzzy	Report
11	R2	Italy	Monza	26 September	(United States) Scott Russell	(Italy) Fabrizio Pirovano	(Italy) Giancarlo Falappa	Team Raymond Roche Ducati	Report
12	R1	United Kingdom	Donington	3 October	(United Kingdom) Carl Fogarty	(United Kingdom) Carl Fogarty	(United States) Scott Russell	Team Kawasaki Muzzy	Report
12	R2	United Kingdom	Donington	3 October	(United Kingdom) Carl Fogarty	(United States) Scott Russell	(United States) Scott Russell	Team Kawasaki Muzzy	Report
13	R1	Portugal	Estoril	17 October	(New Zealand) Aaron Slight	(New Zealand) Simon Crafar	(Italy) Fabrizio Pirovano	Team Yamaha BYRD	Report
13	R2	Portugal	Estoril	17 October	(New Zealand) Aaron Slight	(United Kingdom) Carl Fogarty	(United Kingdom) Carl Fogarty	Team Raymond Roche Ducati	Report
14	R1	Mexico	Hermanos Rodríguez	7 November	Cancelled due to safety concerns				Report
14	R2	Mexico	Hermanos Rodríguez	7 November	Cancelled due to safety concerns				Report

Footnotes

== Championship standings ==
In each race, points were awarded as follows:

Position	1st	2nd	3rd	4th	5th	6th	7th	8th	9th	10th	11th	12th	13th	14th	15th
Points	20	17	15	13	11	10	9	8	7	6	5	4	3	2	1

=== Riders' standings ===
1993 final riders' standings
Pos.	Rider	Bike	IRL (Republic of Ireland)		GER (Germany)		ESP (Spain)		SMR (San Marino)		AUT (Austria)		CZE (Czech Republic)		SWE (Sweden)		MAL (Malaysia)		JPN (Japan)		NED (Netherlands)		ITA (Italy)		GBR (United Kingdom)		POR (Portugal)		MEX (Mexico)		Pts
Pos.	Rider	Bike	R1	R2	R1	R2	R1	R2	R1	R2	R1	R2^{‡}	R1	R2	R1	R2	R1	R2	R1	R2	R1	R2	R1	R2	R1	R2	R1	R2	R1	R2	Pts
1	(United States) Scott Russell	Kawasaki	**2**	**2**	**6**	**1**	Ret	2	4	2	**3**	**7**	2	1	4	2	2	2	8	1	2	2	**2**	**5**	1	1	Ret	2	C	C	378.5
2	(United Kingdom) Carl Fogarty	Ducati	Ret	DNS	3	7	1	1	5	3	4	4	**1**	**2**	**1**	**1**	**1**	**1**	**1**	**Ret**	**1**	**1**	4	4	**2**	**Ret**	Ret	1	C	C	349.5
3	(New Zealand) Aaron Slight	Kawasaki	5	6	4	4	**2**	**3**	6	6	2	Ret	3	Ret	8	5	4	6	6	4	3	6	1	2	3	2	**3**	**5**	C	C	316
4	(Italy) Fabrizio Pirovano	Yamaha	17	3	2	5	4	7	3	11	Ret	18	4	4	3	4	3	3	7	5	Ret	4	3	3	4	6	1	3	C	C	290
5	(Italy) Giancarlo Falappa	Ducati	1	1	1	3	Ret	Ret	**1**	**1**	6	1	5	Ret	2	3	Ret	Ret	5	Ret	Ret	7	Ret	1	Ret	5	4	4	C	C	255
6	(Italy) Piergiorgio Bontempi	Kawasaki	Ret	Ret	30	9	3	6	Ret	7	5	15	7	6	7	8	6	4	9	Ret	6	10	Ret	8	5	8	2	10	C	C	184.5
7	(Belgium) Stéphane Mertens	Ducati	6	4	Ret	6	Ret	4	Ret	10	9	Ret	10	3	6	6	5	5	4	Ret	4	3	Ret	7	DNQ	DNQ			C	C	172
8	(United Kingdom) Terry Rymer	Yamaha	Ret	5	8	Ret	7	9	9	9	Ret	Ret	9	Ret	Ret	Ret	Ret	8	10	7	7	9	DNQ	DNQ	Ret	Ret	5	6	C	C	116
9	(Sweden) Christer Lindholm	Yamaha	Ret	Ret	9	13	13	18	19	DNS	12	16	Ret	7	9	Ret	8	10	14	12	9	8	6	9	9	10	Ret	12	C	C	102
10	(Italy) Mauro Lucchiari	Ducati	13	12	16	Ret	12	10	2	4	Ret	5	6	Ret	Ret	Ret	7	9	Ret	Ret	10	Ret	Ret	6	Ret	Ret			C	C	94.5
11	(United States) Fred Merkel	Yamaha	7	7	Ret	12	9	12																							91.5
11	(United States) Fred Merkel	Ducati							10	Ret	11	2	Ret	5	12	Ret	9	Ret	Ret	Ret	11	Ret					11	9	C	C	91.5
12	(Spain) Juan Garriga	Ducati	11	8	Ret	2	6	5	7	5																			C	C	71
13	(United Kingdom) Brian Morrison	Kawasaki	3	Ret	21	20									Ret	10					Ret	16	8	12	6	9	8	8	C	C	66
14	(Netherlands) Jeffrey de Vries	Yamaha	Ret	Ret	11	Ret	16	15	11	12	7	9	14	8	13	9	Ret	12	Ret	Ret	12	11	Ret	Ret	Ret	Ret	12	Ret	C	C	64.5
15	(Austria) Andreas Meklau	Ducati									1	3													7	7	7	7	C	C	63.5
16	(United Kingdom) James Whitham	Yamaha	Ret	Ret			11	11							5	Ret					5	5	Ret	Ret	Ret	3			C	C	58
17	(Italy) Fabrizio Furlan	Kawasaki			17	Ret	14	Ret	Ret	Ret	10	20	17	16	10	7	10	Ret	16	11	13	13	9	14	Ret	19	Ret	19	C	C	49
18	(France) Adrien Morillas	Kawasaki	4	11	5	8	Ret	13															13	Ret	Ret	Ret			C	C	43
19	(Switzerland) Andreas Hofmann	Kawasaki			7	Ret							11	10							8	12			8	Ret			C	C	40
20	(Japan) Keiichi Kitagawa	Kawasaki																	2	2									C	C	34
21	(New Zealand) Simon Crafar	Ducati			Ret	10	8	8																			6	Ret	C	C	32
22	(United States) Tripp Nobles	Honda	10	Ret	19	21	Ret	24	15	18	17	8	21	13	16	Ret					Ret	23	5	10	22	18			C	C	31
23	(France) Jean-Marc Delétang	Yamaha							14	15	13	10	Ret	12	11	Ret	12	13	Ret	16	DNQ	DNQ			19	16	13	13	C	C	31
24	(Japan) Shoichi Tsukamoto	Kawasaki																	3	3									C	C	30
25	(Italy) Baldassarre Monti	Ducati	Ret	13	Ret	24																									23
25	(Italy) Baldassarre Monti	Yamaha							8	8	16	Ret	12	Ret							Ret	DNS	DNS	DNS					C	C	23
26	(Germany) Ernst Gschwender	Kawasaki	Ret	10	25	Ret					8	6	15	14							15	Ret							C	C	23
27	(France) Dominique Sarron	Yamaha			13	16	Ret	16													Ret	Ret	11	Ret	Ret	Ret	9	11	C	C	20
28	(France) Hervé Moineau	Suzuki	14	Ret	18	22	Ret	22	17	19	22	12			17	11	Ret	11	19	Ret			14	13					C	C	19
29	(Italy) Aldeo Presciutti	Ducati	18	Ret	24	26	15	17	12	17	Ret	Ret	13	9	21	Ret	Ret	16	13	Ret	21	Ret	19	Ret	Ret	22	17	16	C	C	18
30	(Switzerland) Edwin Weibel	Ducati			12	11							8	Ret															C	C	17
31	(Spain) Daniel Amatriain	Ducati	Ret	15	Ret	15	5	Ret	Ret	13																			C	C	16
32	(Japan) Toshiyuki Arakaki	Ducati																	11	6									C	C	15
33	(Switzerland) Marcel Ernst	Kawasaki									14	13									Ret	24	10	11	21	Ret			C	C	14.5
34	(United Kingdom) Niall Mackenzie	Ducati																							Ret	4			C	C	13
35	(France) Alex Vieira	Yamaha																			Ret	15	7	DNS	16	15	Ret	Ret	C	C	11
36	(Italy) Valerio Destefanis	Yamaha	12	9	20	23	19	19																					C	C	11
37	(France) Denis Bonoris	Kawasaki																					15	22	18	14	10	14	C	C	11
38	(France) Christian Lavieille	Ducati													18	Ret					14	Ret	DNQ	DNQ	11	13	16	15	C	C	11
39	(Australia) Rob Phillis	Kawasaki															Ret	7											C	C	9
40	(United Kingdom) David Jefferies	Yamaha	9	14																					DNQ	DNQ			C	C	9
41	(Japan) Shoji Miyazaki	Kawasaki																	Ret	8									C	C	8
42	(Republic of Ireland) Mark Farmer	Kawasaki	8	Ret													Ret	DNS											C	C	8
43	(Japan) Makoto Suzuki	Ducati																	15	9									C	C	8
44	(United Kingdom) Rob McElnea	Yamaha	Ret	Ret			10	14																					C	C	8
45	(Switzerland) Roger Kellenberger	Yamaha			10	14															23	19							C	C	8
46	(Hungary) Árpád Harmati	Yamaha			31	19			13	16	19	Ret	Ret	DNS	DNS	12					16	21							C	C	7
47	(United Kingdom) Jeremy McWilliams	Ducati																							10	Ret			C	C	6
48	(Japan) Shinichiro Imai	Kawasaki																	20	10									C	C	6
49	(Australia) Benn Archibald	Yamaha															11	15											C	C	6
50	(Germany) Bernhard Schick	Ducati			15	18							16	11							DNS	DNS							C	C	6
51	(United Kingdom) Matt Llewellyn	Kawasaki	Ret	16			18	21													DNQ	DNQ			Ret	11			C	C	5
52	(Germany) Michael Liedl	Kawasaki																							15	12			C	C	5
53	(Germany) Udo Mark	Yamaha	19	Ret	14	17			16	14	20	14	Ret	DNS							18	17							C	C	5
54	(United Kingdom) Steve Hislop	Ducati																							12	DNS			C	C	4
55	(Italy) Mauro Mastrelli	Yamaha					24	26	18	20			22	Ret							24	20	12	17					C	C	4
56	(Japan) Katsuyoshi Takahashi	Yamaha																	12	Ret									C	C	4
57	(France) Jean-Yves Mounier	Yamaha													15	13					19	22	17	18	Ret	Ret	Ret	Ret	C	C	4
58	(France) Thierry Rogier	Ducati									15	11	18	Ret															C	C	3.5
59	(United Kingdom) Michael Rutter	Kawasaki	Ret	Ret																					13	17			C	C	3
60	(Japan) Masao Nakata	Yamaha																	18	13									C	C	3
61	(Australia) Ken Watson	Kawasaki															13	18											C	C	3
62	(Australia) Trevor Jordan	Kawasaki															15	14											C	C	3
63	(France) Michel Graziano	Suzuki																									14	17	C	C	2
64	(United Kingdom) Ray Stringer	Kawasaki	Ret	Ret																					14	Ret			C	C	2
65	(Netherlands) Mile Pajic	Kawasaki																			17	14							C	C	2
66	(Japan) Masato Mogi	Kawasaki																	17	14									C	C	2
67	(Malaysia) Cletus Adi Haslam	Kawasaki															14	17											C	C	2
68	(Norway) Rolf Kåre Valderhaug	Yamaha													19	14													C	C	2
69	(France) Philippe Mouchet	Ducati											Ret	Ret	14	Ret					Ret	DNS	Ret	Ret					C	C	2
70	(Portugal) Telmo Pereira	Suzuki																									15	18	C	C	1
71	(Switzerland) Hugues Blanc	Kawasaki																					Ret	15					C	C	1
72	(Japan) Hideo Senmyo	Honda																	27	15									C	C	1
73	(France) Christy Rebuttini	Ducati									18	Ret	20	17	Ret	15					DNQ	DNQ	DNQ	DNQ	DNQ	DNQ			C	C	1
74	(Switzerland) Marcel Kellenberger	Kawasaki											19	15							20	18							C	C	1
75	(Switzerland) Beni Metzger	Yamaha	15	Ret	DNS	DNS																									1
75	(Switzerland) Beni Metzger	Ducati							Ret	DNS																			C	C	1
Pos.	Rider	Bike	IRL (Republic of Ireland)		GER (Germany)		ESP (Spain)		SMR (San Marino)		AUT (Austria)		CZE (Czech Republic)		SWE (Sweden)		MAL (Malaysia)		JPN (Japan)		NED (Netherlands)		ITA (Italy)		GBR (United Kingdom)		POR (Portugal)		MEX (Mexico)		Pts

Colour	Result
Gold	Winner
Silver	Second place
Bronze	Third place
Green	Points classification
Blue	Non-points classification
Blue	Non-classified finish (NC)
Purple	Retired, not classified (Ret)
Red	Did not qualify (DNQ)
Red	Did not pre-qualify (DNPQ)
Black	Disqualified (DSQ)
White	Did not start (DNS)
White	Withdrew (WD)
White	Race cancelled (C)
Blank	Did not practice (DNP)
Blank	Did not arrive (DNA)
Blank	Excluded (EX)

**Bold** – Pole position
Italics – Fastest lap

^{‡} The second race in Zeltweg was stopped early due to rain; half points were awarded.

=== Manufacturers' standings ===
1993 final manufacturers' standings
Pos.	Manufacturer	IRL (Republic of Ireland)		GER (Germany)		ESP (Spain)		SMR (San Marino)		AUT (Austria)		CZE (Czech Republic)		SWE (Sweden)		MAL (Malaysia)		JPN (Japan)		NED (Netherlands)		ITA (Italy)		GBR (United Kingdom)		POR (Portugal)		Pts
Pos.	Manufacturer	R1	R2	R1	R2	R1	R2	R1	R2	R1	R2^{‡}	R1	R2	R1	R2	R1	R2	R1	R2	R1	R2	R1	R2	R1	R2	R1	R2	Pts
1	(Italy) Ducati	1	1	1	2	1	1	1	1	1	1	1	2	1	1	1	1	1	6	1	1	4	1	2	4	4	1	470
2	(Japan) Kawasaki	2	2	4	1	2	2	4	2	2	6	2	1	4	2	2	2	2	1	2	2	1	2	1	1	2	2	436
3	(Japan) Yamaha	7	3	2	5	4	7	3	8	7	9	4	4	3	4	3	3	7	5	5	4	3	3	4	3	1	3	330.5
4	(Japan) Honda	10	Ret	19	21	Ret	24	15	18	17	8	21	13	16	18			22	15	Ret	23	5	10	22	18			32
5	(Japan) Suzuki	14	Ret	18	22	Ret	22	17	19	22	12	DNQ	DNQ	17	11	Ret	11	19	Ret			14	13	DNQ	DNQ	14	17	21
Pos.	Manufacturer	IRL (Republic of Ireland)		GER (Germany)		ESP (Spain)		SMR (San Marino)		AUT (Austria)		CZE (Czech Republic)		SWE (Sweden)		MAL (Malaysia)		JPN (Japan)		NED (Netherlands)		ITA (Italy)		GBR (United Kingdom)		POR (Portugal)		Pts

^{‡} The second race in Zeltweg was stopped early due to rain; half points were awarded.
