= Mile Pajic =

Dutch motorcycle racer

- Nationality: Dutch
- Born: 29 December 1955 (age 70); Ulft, Netherlands
Motorcycle racing career statistics
500cc World Championship
Active years	1984–1986
Manufacturers	Honda
Championships	0
1986 championship position	19th (3 pts)
Starts / Wins / Podiums / Poles / F. laps / Points; 14 / 0 / 0 / 0 / 0 / 6
Superbike World Championship
Active years	1989, 1992–1995
Manufacturers	Kawasaki
Championships	0
1995 championship position	50th (3 pts)
Starts / Wins / Podiums / Poles / F. laps / Points; 14 / 0 / 0 / 0 / 0 / 10
Supersport World Championship
Active years	1997–1999, 2005
Manufacturers	Kawasaki
Championships	0
2005 championship position	NC (0 pts)
Starts / Wins / Podiums / Poles / F. laps / Points; 4 / 0 / 0 / 0 / 0 / 17

Mile Pajic (born 29 December 1955) is a Dutch former professional motorcycle racer. He raced in Grand Prix racing between 1984 and 1986, scoring six championship points.

== Career ==
Pajic made his first Grand Prix start at the 500cc British Grand Prix at Silverstone in 1984. In 1985, Pajic made three Grand Prix start and scored his first points with an eight place finish at the Dutch TT. He finished a career-high 17th in the championship that year. Pajic made nine Grand Prix starts in 1986 and matched his previous best finish of eight at the Belgian Grand Prix in Spa. Pajic finished 19th in the championship that year in what would be his final season in Grand Prix racing.

After his Grand Prix career, Pajic became a regular in the Superbike World Championship. He made 14 starts between 1989 and 1995 with a best finish of 11th at the second race at Assen in 1992.

== Career statistics ==
=== Grand Prix motorcycle racing ===
==== Races by year ====
(key) (Races in bold indicate pole position) (Races in italics indicate fastest lap)

Year	Class	Bike	1	2	3	4	5	6	7	8	9	10	11	12	Pos	Pts
1984	500cc	Honda	RSA	NAT	SPA	AUT	GER	FRA	YUG	NED	BEL	GBR; 24	SWE	RSM; Ret	NC	0
1985	500cc	Honda	RSA	SPA; Ret	GER	NAT	AUT	YUG	NED; 8	BEL; 21	FRA	GBR	SWE	RSM	17th	3
1986	500cc	Honda	SPA	NAT	GER; Ret	AUT; 18	YUG; 18	NED; 16	BEL; 8	FRA; 16	GBR; Ret	SWE; 21	RSM; 23		19th	3

=== Superbike World Championship ===
==== Races by year ====
(key) (Races in bold indicate pole position) (Races in italics indicate fastest lap)

Year	Bike	1		2		3		4		5		6		7		8		9		10		11		12		13		Pos	Pts
Year	Bike	R1	R2	R1	R2	R1	R2	R1	R2	R1	R2	R1	R2	R1	R2	R1	R2	R1	R2	R1	R2	R1	R2	R1	R2	R1	R2	Pos	Pts
1989	Kawasaki	GBR	GBR	HUN; DNQ	HUN; DNQ	CAN	CAN	USA	USA	AUT; 33	AUT; 29	FRA; 22	FRA; 20	JPN	JPN	GER; DNQ	GER; DNQ	ITA	ITA	AUS	AUS	NZL	NZL					NC	0
1992	Kawasaki	SPA	SPA	GBR; DNQ	GBR; DNQ	GER	GER	BEL; 16	BEL; Ret	SPA	SPA	AUT	AUT	ITA	ITA	MAL	MAL	JPN	JPN	NED; 21	NED; 11	ITA	ITA	AUS	AUS	NZL	NZL	52nd	5
1993	Kawasaki	IRL	IRL	GER	GER	SPA	SPA	SMR	SMR	AUT	AUT	CZE	CZE	SWE	SWE	MAL	MAL	JPN	JPN	NED; 17	NED; 14	ITA	ITA	GBR	GBR	POR	POR	65th	2
1994	Kawasaki	GBR	GBR	GER	GER	ITA	ITA	SPA	SPA	AUT	AUT	INA	INA	JPN	JPN	NED; 21	NED; 24	SMR	SMR	EUR	EUR	AUS	AUS					NC	0
1995	Kawasaki	GER	GER	SMR	SMR	GBR	GBR	ITA	ITA	SPA	SPA	AUT	AUT	USA	USA	EUR	EUR	JPN	JPN	NED; Ret	NED; 13	INA	INA	AUS	AUS			50th	3

=== Supersport World Championship ===
==== Races by year ====
(key) (Races in bold indicate pole position) (Races in italics indicate fastest lap)

Year	Bike	1	2	3	4	5	6	7	8	9	10	11	12	Pos	Pts
1997	Kawasaki	SMR	GBR	GER	ITA	EUR	AUT	NED; 10	GER	SPA	JPN	INA		31st	6
1998	Kawasaki	GBR	ITA	SPA	GER	SMR	RSA	USA	EUR	AUT	NED; 5			25th	11
1999	Kawasaki	RSA	GBR	SPA	ITA	GER	SMR	USA	EUR	AUT	NED; 20	GER		NC	0
2005	Kawasaki	QAT	AUS	SPA	ITA	EUR	SMR	CZE	GBR	NED; 20	GER	ITA	FRA	NC	0
