= 1994 Superbike World Championship =

1994 Superbike World Championship
Previous:	1993	Next:	1995

The 1994 Superbike World Championship was the seventh FIM Superbike World Championship season. The season started on 2 May at Donington and finished on 30 October at Phillip Island after 11 rounds.

Carl Fogarty won the riders' championship with 10 victories and Ducati won the manufacturers' championship.

== Race calendar and results ==
1994 Superbike World Championship Calendar
Round		Circuit	Date	Pole position	Fastest lap	Winning rider	Winning team	Report
1	R1	(United Kingdom) Donington	2 May	(United States) Scott Russell	(Australia) Troy Corser	(United Kingdom) Carl Fogarty	Ducati Corse Virginio Ferrari	Report
1	R2	(United Kingdom) Donington	2 May	(United States) Scott Russell	(United States) Scott Russell	(United States) Scott Russell	Team Kawasaki Muzzy	Report
2	R1	(Germany) Hockenheim	8 May	(United States) Scott Russell	(Italy) Fabrizio Pirovano	(United States) Scott Russell	Team Kawasaki Muzzy	Report
2	R2	(Germany) Hockenheim	8 May	(United States) Scott Russell	(United States) Scott Russell	(United States) Scott Russell	Team Kawasaki Muzzy	Report
3	R1	(Italy) Misano	29 May	(United States) Scott Russell	(Italy) Piergiorgio Bontempi	(United States) Scott Russell	Team Kawasaki Muzzy	Report
3	R2	(Italy) Misano	29 May	(United States) Scott Russell	(Italy) Giancarlo Falappa	(Italy) Giancarlo Falappa	Ducati Corse Virginio Ferrari	Report
4	R1	(Spain) Albacete	19 June	(United Kingdom) Carl Fogarty	(United Kingdom) Carl Fogarty	(United Kingdom) Carl Fogarty	Ducati Corse Virginio Ferrari	Report
4	R2	(Spain) Albacete	19 June	(United Kingdom) Carl Fogarty	(United Kingdom) Carl Fogarty	(United Kingdom) Carl Fogarty	Ducati Corse Virginio Ferrari	Report
5	R1	(Austria) Österreichring	17 July	(United Kingdom) Carl Fogarty	(Austria) Andreas Meklau	(United Kingdom) Carl Fogarty	Ducati Corse Virginio Ferrari	Report
5	R2	(Austria) Österreichring	17 July	(United Kingdom) Carl Fogarty	(United Kingdom) Carl Fogarty	(United Kingdom) Carl Fogarty	Ducati Corse Virginio Ferrari	Report
6	R1	(Indonesia) Sentul	21 August	(United Kingdom) Carl Fogarty	(United Kingdom) Carl Fogarty	(United Kingdom) Jamie Whitham	Moto Cinelli	Report
6	R2	(Indonesia) Sentul	21 August	(United Kingdom) Carl Fogarty	(United Kingdom) Carl Fogarty	(United Kingdom) Carl Fogarty	Ducati Corse Virginio Ferrari	Report
7	R1	(Japan) Sugo	28 August	(Japan) Yasutomo Nagai	(Italy) Fabrizio Pirovano	(United States) Scott Russell	Team Kawasaki Muzzy	Report
7	R2	(Japan) Sugo	28 August	(Japan) Yasutomo Nagai	(United Kingdom) Carl Fogarty	(United States) Scott Russell	Team Kawasaki Muzzy	Report
8	R1	(Netherlands) Assen	12 September	(United Kingdom) Carl Fogarty	(United Kingdom) Carl Fogarty	(United Kingdom) Carl Fogarty	Ducati Corse Virginio Ferrari	Report
8	R2	(Netherlands) Assen	12 September	(United Kingdom) Carl Fogarty	(United Kingdom) Carl Fogarty	(United Kingdom) Carl Fogarty	Ducati Corse Virginio Ferrari	Report
9	R1	(San Marino) Mugello	25 September	(United Kingdom) Carl Fogarty	(United States) Scott Russell	(United States) Scott Russell	Team Kawasaki Muzzy	Report
9	R2	(San Marino) Mugello	25 September	(United Kingdom) Carl Fogarty	(United States) Scott Russell	(United Kingdom) Carl Fogarty	Ducati Corse Virginio Ferrari	Report
10	R1	(Europe) Donington	2 October	(United Kingdom) Carl Fogarty	(Australia) Troy Corser	(United States) Scott Russell	Team Kawasaki Muzzy	Report
10	R2	(Europe) Donington	2 October	(United Kingdom) Carl Fogarty	(United States) Scott Russell	(United States) Scott Russell	Team Kawasaki Muzzy	Report
11	R1	(Australia) Phillip Island	30 October	(Australia) Anthony Gobert	(United Kingdom) Carl Fogarty	(United Kingdom) Carl Fogarty	Ducati Corse Virginio Ferrari	Report
11	R2	(Australia) Phillip Island	30 October	(Australia) Anthony Gobert	(United Kingdom) Carl Fogarty	(Australia) Anthony Gobert	Anthony Gobert Racing	Report

== Championship standings ==
=== Riders' standings ===
1994 final riders' standings
Pos.	Rider	Bike	GBR (United Kingdom)		GER (Germany)		ITA (Italy)		ESP (Spain)		AUT (Austria)		INA (Indonesia)		JPN (Japan)		NED (Netherlands)		SMR (San Marino)		EUR (Europe)		AUS (Australia)		Pts
Pos.	Rider	Bike	R1	R2	R1	R2	R1	R2	R1	R2	R1	R2	R1	R2	R1	R2	R1	R2	R1	R2	R1	R2	R1	R2	Pts
1	(United Kingdom) Fogarty	Ducati	1	2	DNS	DNS	Ret	5	**1**	**1**	**1**	**1**	**Ret**	**1**	4	2	**1**	**1**	**2**	**1**	**14**	**5**	1	2	305
2	(United States) Russell	Kawasaki	**4**	**1**	**1**	**1**	**1**	**2**	Ret	Ret	14	12	3	3	1	1	6	9	1	Ret	1	1	2	17	280
3	(New Zealand) Slight	Honda	2	Ret	2	Ret	3	4	2	2	4	4	2	2	6	7	3	2	4	2	8	10	4	4	277
4	(United States) Polen	Honda	9	7	5	3	12	15	6	7	3	3	4	6	10	16	11	Ret	11	7	12	Ret	11	11	158
5	(New Zealand) Crafar	Honda	6	5	7	Ret	7	11	8	14	6	6	5	10	Ret	14	7	7	9	9	5	15	10	6	153
6	(Austria) Meklau	Ducati	15	DSQ	Ret	10	10	10	7	4	2	2	6	5	9	Ret	9	12	6	DNS	7	9	14	10	148
7	(United Kingdom) Whitham	Ducati	DNS	DNS			11	Ret	3	3	7	Ret	1	4	Ret	10	5	5	8	4	Ret	Ret	Ret	Ret	129
8	(Italy) Bontempi	Kawasaki	7	Ret	Ret	Ret	Ret	7	4	6	11	9	11	11	12	17	Ret	DSQ	10	6	6	7	9	9	116
9	(Italy) Pirovano	Ducati	3	Ret	Ret	2	Ret	6	Ret	11	8	Ret	16	Ret	2	Ret	Ret	11	5	5	Ret	12	22	8	111
10	(United Kingdom) Rymer	Kawasaki	Ret	DNS	3	6	Ret	9	5	5	Ret	11	8	7	23	9	4	6	Ret	DNS					106
11	(Australia) Corser	Ducati	Ret	3															3	Ret	2	2	5	3	90
12	(Italy) Lucchiari	Yamaha	23	8	Ret	Ret																			79
12	(Italy) Lucchiari	Ducati					5	3	Ret	Ret	Ret	Ret					Ret	3	Ret	3	Ret	3			79
13	(Italy) Casoli	Yamaha							DNS	DNS	Ret	7					2	4	7	Ret	3	4	DNS	DNS	76
14	(Belgium) Mertens	Ducati	18	Ret	21	Ret	4	Ret	9	10	5	5	9	9	Ret	Ret	10	DNS	15	14	20	Ret	Ret	12	75
15	(Italy) Falappa	Ducati	5	4	Ret	4	2	1																	74
16	(United Kingdom) Morrison	Honda	8	6	14	16	17	17	10	13	DNS	Ret	12	13	16	Ret	Ret	20	16	11	9	8	20	18	56
17	(Australia) Gobert	Honda													8	6									53
17	(Australia) Gobert	Kawasaki																					**3**	**1**	53
18	(Italy) Destefanis	Ducati	11	Ret	Ret	7	6	8	Ret	Ret	Ret	Ret	10	12	Ret	27	18	19	Ret	Ret	13	Ret	Ret	Ret	45
19	(France) Morillas	Kawasaki			17	Ret	4	Ret	12	9	Ret	DNS	7	8	13	19	Ret	Ret					Ret	Ret	44
20	(Germany) Schmid	Kawasaki			19	13					16	8					8	8	Ret	8	11	Ret			40
21	(Italy) Meregalli	Yamaha					9	12	Ret	16	12	15					19	17	14	10	15	11			30
22	(France) Mounier	Ducati	12	9	6	14			20	18							12	14							29
23	(Italy) Foti	Ducati	Ret	15	Ret	Ret	Ret	13	11	12	13	10					Ret	13	12	Ret	Ret	Ret			29
24	(Japan) Kitagawa	Kawasaki			Ret	5									Ret	3									26
25	(Japan) Nagai	Yamaha													**3**	**5**									26
26	(Italy) Moroni	Kawasaki	10	10	Ret	11	15	14	Ret	DNS	Ret	Ret	13	15	27	Ret	DNQ	DNQ	20	15	25	Ret			25
27	(Japan) Yoshikawa	Yamaha													5	4									24
28	(United Kingdom) Carter	Ducati																			4	6			23
29	(Australia) McCarthy	Honda																					6	5	21
30	(Sweden) Lindholm	Yamaha			Ret	12					15	14					Ret	10	13	12	Ret	16			20
31	(Australia) Giles	Ducati													Ret	25							8	7	17
32	(Japan) Aoki	Honda													7	8									17
33	(Switzerland) Weibel	Ducati			8	8																			16
34	(Australia) Phillis	Kawasaki			9	Ret					10	13					16	Ret							16
35	(Portugal) Vieira	Honda	21	12	11	17					20	17	15	14	14	21	Ret	DNS							14
36	(Spain) Cardús	Ducati							13	8															11
37	(Australia) Mladin	Kawasaki																					7	Ret	9
38	(Italy) Liverani	Honda	27	17	DNQ	DNQ	8	Ret	18	15	Ret	DNS					DNQ	DNQ	23	17	24	Ret			9
39	(United Kingdom) Rutter	Ducati	13	Ret																	10	19			9
40	(Netherlands) de Vries	Yamaha	DNQ	DNQ													14	15	19	13	18	13			9
41	(Germany) Mark	Ducati			15	9													22	Ret					8
42	(Italy) Panichi	Ducati	28	Ret	18	Ret	Ret	Ret			9	16					20	21	DNS	DNS					7
43	(Australia) Goddard	Suzuki											12	13											7
44	(Belgium) Paquay	Honda	Ret	16	13	20	Ret	Ret	15	Ret	Ret	Ret					13	18	DNQ	DNQ	16	17			7
45	(Switzerland) Kellenberger	Yamaha			10	Ret					18	DNS													6
46	(Italy) Perselli	Ducati	16	Ret	12	Ret	14	Ret	23	22	DNQ	DNQ					Ret	25	18	Ret	26	Ret			6
47	(Japan) Fujiwara	Yamaha													Ret	11									5
48	(Japan) Yanagawa	Suzuki													11	18									5
49	(United Kingdom) Hopkins	Yamaha	20	11			20	Ret													Ret	Ret			5
50	(Japan) Haga	Ducati													21	12									4
51	(Australia) Leslie	Ducati																					13	Ret	3
52	(Japan) Tsukamoto	Kawasaki													Ret	13									3
53	(Italy) Mariottini	Ducati					13	Ret			DNS	DNS					DNQ	DNQ	Ret	Ret					3
54	(France) Kuhn	Honda	24	13	DNQ	DNQ			Ret	DNS	DNQ	DNQ	Ret	16	DNQ	DNQ	DNQ	DNQ							3
55	(France) Bonoris	Kawasaki	22	14	Ret	15			21	19	DNQ	DNQ					DNQ	DNQ							3
56	(Australia) Craggil	Kawasaki																					Ret	14	2
57	(United Kingdom) Llewellyn	Ducati	19	Ret	17	19															17	14			2
58	(France) Muteau	Kawasaki	DNQ	DNQ	DNQ	DNQ																			2
58	(France) Muteau	Ducati					22	Ret	22	21	DNQ	DNQ	14	17	DNQ	DNQ	DNQ	DNQ	DNQ	DNQ					2
59	(Italy) Caracchi	Ducati	Ret	Ret	DNQ	DNQ	Ret	16	14	Ret							Ret	Ret	Ret	Ret					2
60	(United Kingdom) Moodie	Yamaha	14	Ret																	Ret	Ret			2
61	(Australia) Martin	Suzuki																					15	15	2
62	(Hungary) Harmati	Yamaha															15	16	21	16					1
63	(Japan) Takeishi	Honda													Ret	15									1
64	(Japan) Iwahashi	Honda													15	20									1
	(Indonesia) Karnada	Yamaha											DNQ	DNQ											0
	(Indonesia) Bar	Kawasaki											DNQ	DNQ											0
	(Indonesia) Sudarsono	Suzuki											DNQ	DNQ											0
	(Indonesia) Otto	Kawasaki											DNQ	DNQ											0
Pos.	Rider	Bike	GBR (United Kingdom)		GER (Germany)		ITA (Italy)		ESP (Spain)		AUT (Austria)		INA (Indonesia)		JPN (Japan)		NED (Netherlands)		SMR (San Marino)		EUR (Europe)		AUS (Australia)		Pts

Colour	Result
Gold	Winner
Silver	Second place
Bronze	Third place
Green	Points classification
Blue	Non-points classification
Blue	Non-classified finish (NC)
Purple	Retired, not classified (Ret)
Red	Did not qualify (DNQ)
Red	Did not pre-qualify (DNPQ)
Black	Disqualified (DSQ)
White	Did not start (DNS)
White	Withdrew (WD)
White	Race cancelled (C)
Blank	Did not practice (DNP)
Blank	Did not arrive (DNA)
Blank	Excluded (EX)

**Bold** – Pole position
Italics – Fastest lap

=== Manufacturers' standings ===
1994 final manufacturers' standings
Pos.	Manufacturer	GBR (United Kingdom)		GER (Germany)		ITA (Italy)		ESP (Spain)		AUT (Austria)		INA (Indonesia)		JPN (Japan)		NED (Netherlands)		SMR (San Marino)		EUR (Europe)		AUS (Australia)		Pts
Pos.	Manufacturer	R1	R2	R1	R2	R1	R2	R1	R2	R1	R2	R1	R2	R1	R2	R1	R2	R1	R2	R1	R2	R1	R2	Pts
1	(Italy) Ducati	1	2	6	2	2	1	1	1	1	1	1	1	2	2	1	1	2	1	2	2	1	2	403
2	(Japan) Kawasaki	4	1	1	1	1	2	4	6	10	8	3	3	1	1	4	6	1	6	1	1	2	1	348
3	(Japan) Honda	2	5	2	3	3	4	2	2	3	3	2	2	6	6	3	2	4	2	5	8	4	4	313
4	(Japan) Yamaha	14	8	10	12	9	12	17	16	12	7	DNQ	DNQ	3	4	2	4	7	12	3	4	DNS	DNS	145
5	(Japan) Suzuki			Ret	21							DNQ	DNQ	11	18							12	13	12
Pos.	Manufacturer	GBR (United Kingdom)		GER (Germany)		ITA (Italy)		ESP (Spain)		AUT (Austria)		INA (Indonesia)		JPN (Japan)		NED (Netherlands)		SMR (San Marino)		EUR (Europe)		AUS (Australia)		Pts
