= Keiichi Kitagawa =

Japanese motorcycle racer

- Nationality: Japanese
- Born: March 24, 1967 (age 59); Kyoto, Japan
Motorcycle racing career statistics
Grand Prix motorcycle racing
Active years	1998
First race	1998 500cc Japanese Grand Prix
Last race	1998 500cc Japanese Grand Prix
Team	Suzuki
1998 championship position	NC (0 pts)
Starts / Wins / Podiums / Poles / F. laps / Points; 1 / 0 / 0 / 0 / 0 / 0
Superbike World Championship
Active years	1991–2000
Manufacturers	Kawasaki, Suzuki
2000 championship position	31st (18 pts)
Starts / Wins / Podiums / Poles / F. laps / Points; 24 / 1 / 5 / 0 / 1 / 222

Keiichi Kitagawa (北川圭一, Kitagawa Keiichi; born 24 March 1967 in Kyoto, Kyoto Prefecture) is a retired Grand Prix motorcycle road racer from Japan.

He was Japanese Champion in the 1993 F1 All-Japan Road Racing Championship on Kawasaki, 2001 in S-NK All-Japan Road Racing Championship on Suzuki and 2003 JSB1000 All-Japan Road Racing Championship on Suzuki. He won the 1998 Superbike World Championship round at Sugo as a wild card rider for Suzuki. Kitagawa coming 16th in the season's overall standings. He was a semi-regular in the Superbike World Championship in 1995, finishing 17th overall with a best finish of fourth, on a Kawasaki. Kitagawa finished second in the Suzuka 8 Hours race, teamed with Akira Ryo. He was also a three-time winner of the Bol d'Or endurance race. He retired from racing at the end of 2006, after winning the 2005 and 2006 Endurance World Championship.

== Career statistics ==
=== Superbike World Championship ===
==== Races by year ====
(key) (Races in bold indicate pole position) (Races in italics indicate fastest lap)

Year	Bike	1		2		3		4		5		6		7		8		9		10		11		12		13		Pos	Pts
Year	Bike	R1	R2	R1	R2	R1	R2	R1	R2	R1	R2	R1	R2	R1	R2	R1	R2	R1	R2	R1	R2	R1	R2	R1	R2	R1	R2	Pos	Pts
1991	Kawasaki	GBR	GBR	SPA	SPA	CAN	CAN	USA	USA	AUT	AUT	RSM	RSM	SWE	SWE	JPN; Ret	JPN; Ret	MAL	MAL	GER	GER	FRA	FRA	ITA	ITA	AUS	AUS	NC	0
1992	Kawasaki	SPA	SPA	GBR	GBR	GER	GER	BEL	BEL	SPA	SPA	AUT	AUT	ITA	ITA	MAL	MAL	JPN; 7	JPN; 7	NED	NED	ITA	ITA	AUS	AUS	NZL	NZL	30th	18
1993	Kawasaki	IRL	IRL	GER	GER	SPA	SPA	SMR	SMR	AUT	AUT	CZE	CZE	SWE	SWE	MAL	MAL	JPN; 2	JPN; 2	NED	NED	ITA	ITA	GBR	GBR	POR	POR	20th	34
1994	Kawasaki	GBR	GBR	GER; Ret	GER; 5	ITA	ITA	SPA	SPA	AUT	AUT	INA	INA	JPN; Ret	JPN; 3	NED	NED	SMR	SMR	EUR	EUR	AUS	AUS					24th	26
1995	Kawasaki	GER; 5	GER; 12	SMR	SMR	GBR	GBR	ITA	ITA	SPA	SPA	AUT	AUT	USA	USA	EUR	EUR	JPN; 4	JPN; 6	NED	NED	INA	INA	AUS	AUS			17th	38
1996	Suzuki	SMR	SMR	GBR	GBR	GER	GER	ITA	ITA	CZE	CZE	USA	USA	EUR	EUR	INA	INA	JPN; 12	JPN; 10	NED	NED	SPA	SPA	AUS	AUS			30th	10
1997	Suzuki	AUS	AUS	SMR	SMR	GBR	GBR	GER	GER	ITA	ITA	USA	USA	EUR	EUR	AUT	AUT	NED	NED	SPA	SPA	JPN; 4	JPN; Ret	INA	INA			32nd	13
1998	Suzuki	AUS	AUS	GBR	GBR	ITA	ITA	SPA	SPA	GER	GER	SMR	SMR	RSA	RSA	USA	USA	EUR	EUR	AUT	AUT	NED	NED	JPN; 1	JPN; 5			16th	36
1999	Suzuki	RSA	RSA	AUS	AUS	GBR	GBR	SPA	SPA	ITA	ITA	GER	GER	SMR	SMR	USA	USA	EUR	EUR	AUT	AUT	NED	NED	GER	GER	JPN; 4	JPN; 3	22nd	29
2000	Suzuki	RSA	RSA	AUS	AUS	JPN; 6	JPN; 8	GBR	GBR	ITA	ITA	GER	GER	SMR	SMR	SPA	SPA	USA	USA	EUR	EUR	NED	NED	GER	GER	GBR	GBR	31st	18

=== Grand Prix motorcycle racing ===
==== Races by year ====
(key) (Races in bold indicate pole position, races in italics indicate fastest lap)

Year	Class	Bike	1	2	3	4	5	6	7	8	9	10	11	12	13	14	Pos	Pts
1998	500cc	Suzuki	JPN; Ret	MAL	ESP	ITA	FRA	MAD	NED	GBR	GER	CZE	IMO	CAT	AUS	ARG	NC	0

=== FIM Endurance World Championship ===
==== By team ====
Year	Team	Bike	Rider	TC
2005	(France) Suzuki Castrol	Suzuki GSX-R1000	(Japan) Keiichi Kitagawa (France) Vincent Philippe (France) Matthieu Lagrive	1st
2006	(France) Suzuki Castrol	Suzuki GSX-R1000	(Japan) Keiichi Kitagawa (France) Vincent Philippe (France) Matthieu Lagrive	1st
