= Yasutomo Nagai =

Japanese motorcycle racer (1965–1995)

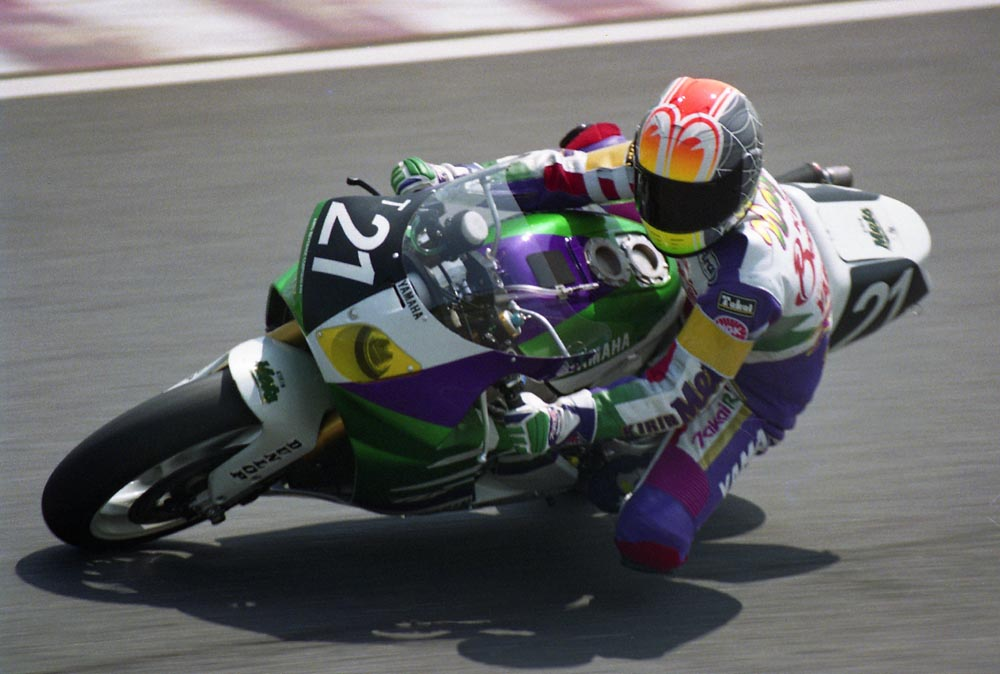

Personal information
- Born: 29 October 1965 Koshigaya, Japan
- Died: 12 September 1995 (aged 29) Assen, Netherlands

Sport
- Country: Japan; France
- Sport: Motorcycle racing

Yasutomo Nagai (永井 康友, Nagai Yasutomo) (October 29, 1965 – September 12, 1995) was a motorcycle road racer, born in Koshigaya, Japan.

== Early life ==
Nagai was born in Koshigaya, Saitama, Japan on 29 October 1965.

== Career ==
Nagai raced in Japan's All-Japan Road Racing Championship for many years, spending seven of them in the late 80s and early 90s racing with the Yamaha Motor Company World Team. He was also a member of the 1994 Bol d'Or winning Yamaha France team, with Dominique and Christian Sarron.

Nagai took two pole positions in the Superbike World Championship. He was the first Japanese racer to take a Championship pole outside Japan (in Austria in 1995). He achieved four podium finishes, including a third place finish at Sugo, Japan a few weeks before his death.

== Accident and death ==
Nagai died two days after crashing at Assen, Netherlands during the 1995 Superbike World Championship race. Riding a Yamaha YZF750, he rode over oil spilled on the track by Fabrizio Pirovano’s Ducati 916. As he fell, his Yamaha landed on top of him, fracturing his skull. Nagai's injuries left him in a coma from which he never regained consciousness. Nagai died in a nearby hospital at the age of 29. Despite not taking part in the final two rounds, he was fifth overall in the 1995 standings.

== Photographs ==
- http://www.highsider.com/textlager/japan_textlager/Nagai.htm
- http://www.highsider.com/textlager/japan_textlager/Nagai_95_01.htm
- http://www.highsider.com/textlager/japan_textlager/Nagai_95_02.htm
- http://www.highsider.com/textlager/japan_textlager/Nagai_95_03.htm
