= James Whitham =

British motorcycle racer

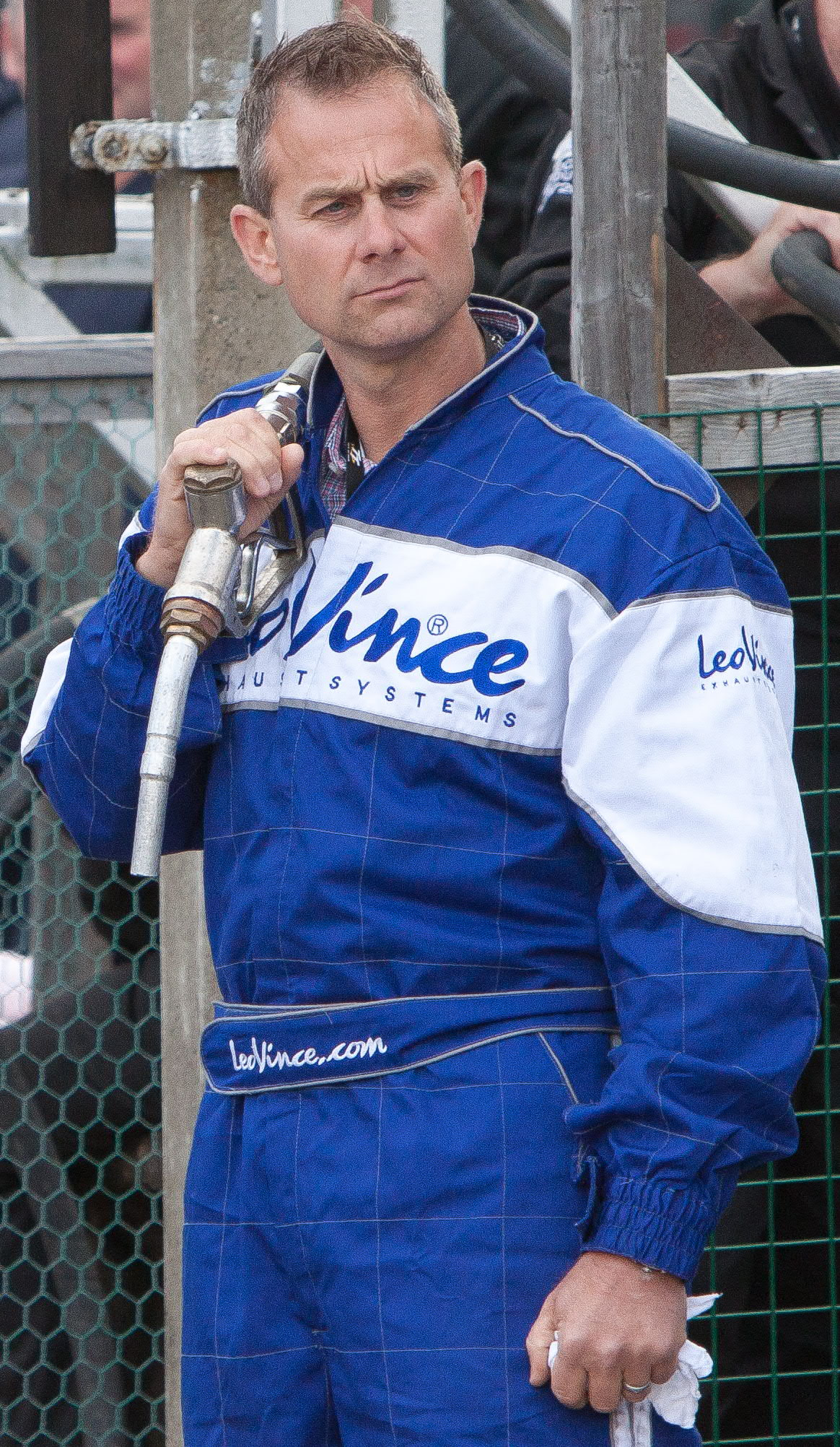
Whitham as part of a TT races refuelling crew in 2012

James Michael "Jamie" Whitham (born 6 September 1966), is an English former professional motorcycle road racer. He raced in most major British and international championships, winning the British championship twice. The readers of Motorcycle News voted him 'Man of the Year' in both 1991 and 1996.

After retiring from racing, Whitham works as a television motorcycle race commentator as well as runs road-race tuition track days. Witham also operates a small private airstrip near Huddersfield, Crosland Moor Airfield.

== Early years ==
Born in Huddersfield, Yorkshire, England, Whitam's first motorcycle as a child was a Raleigh Wisp, a small-wheeled moped, and his favourite early road-going machine was a Yamaha FS1-E, but he admitted to Motorcycle News in 1994 that he was more embarrassed at taking his learner-test with a Suzuki X-5 200 cc sidecar outfit.

Whitham won the 1986 British 80 cc Championship, the 1988 1300 cc Production British Championship, the 1988 Mallory Park Race of the Year, the 1991 MCN TT Superbike Challenge, with Suzuki; and for Yamaha in 1993 in both the British Superbike Championship Supercup and the ACU TT Superbike British Championship. He confirmed to Motor Cycle News in 1994 prior to his World Superbike career that his best biking moment was winning the 750 cc double British championship for Yamaha, and that doing 185 mph at Daytona Speedbowl banking was exhilarating.

Whitham competed in the 1992 French Grand Prix at Magny Cours. He also competed on the Isle of Man - running in the Manx Grand Prix in 1985, and the TT from 1986 to 1989, with three top six results; and he won British championship races at Superstock, Seniorstock, Supersport 600 and TT Formula One levels.

== International racing and health problems ==
In 1994, Whitham raced full-time in the Superbike World Championship for Ducati with team-mate Carl Fogarty, taking a race win at Sentul and finishing seventh overall. He returned to the British series in 1995, leading the standings and taking a podium as a World Superbike Championship wild-card at Brands Hatch, but was diagnosed with Hodgkin lymphoma mid-season. He recovered in time to be British Superbike Championship runner-up in 1996 on a Yamaha, despite not scoring at the first round - he won ten races, twice the number of champion Niall Mackenzie.

Whitham raced for the Harris Suzuki team in the World Superbike Championship in 1997 and 1998, finishing eighth in the championship both seasons with a total of three podiums, but for 1999 the factory contract changed hands, and the new owners hired Pierfrancesco Chili and Katsuaki Fujiwara. Worse was to follow when he was hired by Kenny Roberts' uncompetitive Modenas 500cc World Championship team: he crashed heavily at Brno, breaking his pelvis.

Following his win at Donington during 1999 in a one-off appearance, Whitham competed in the Supersport World Championship from 2000 to 2002. He won his very first race in 2000 before a string of crashes (including while leading at Misano) knocked his confidence and relegated him to eighth overall in 2000. He was fourth overall in 2001, forced to support team-mate Paolo Casoli's bid for the championship. In 2002, he won in the wet at Silverstone, before glaucoma, an eye-condition most likely a consequence of past chemotherapy, caused him to retire at the end of the year. In total, he took four World Supersport victories and 12 podiums. He held the Supersport lap record at Donington Park until Kenan Sofuoglu beat it in 2007.

Whitham confirmed at his own website in May 2017 that his previous cancer problems had recurred, requiring urgent and ongoing chemotherapy and other treatments. This was further updated in December. Whitham was unable to present television coverage of the Isle of Man TT races in May/June 2018 due to intensive treatments as an in-patient at Jimmy's hospital, in the city of Leeds, West Yorkshire.

== Post racing ==
Whitham now operates Crosland Moor airfield, and also runs race-tuition track days, previously with business partner Paul Shoesmith under the defunct company Speed Freak.

Whitham established a second career as a popular TV analyst for Eurosport, Channel 4 and ITV. Whitham provides commentary and analysis for the Isle of Man TT coverage by ITV4 alongside former racer Steve Parrish, which is shown on Velocity Channel in the United States.

Whitham also works as a road tester for the British motorcycle magazine Visordown, and has also worked with the young riders of the Virgin Media Cup. In 2008, he launched his autobiography, 'What A Good Do!'. From January 2013, he hosted and presented The Superbike Show on Loaded TV.

Whitham was awarded an honorary Doctorate qualification by Huddersfield University in July 2009.

== Career record ==
=== British Superbike Championship ===
(key) (Races in bold indicate pole position) (Races in italics indicate fastest lap)

Year	Make	1		2		3		4		5		6		7		8		9		10		Pos	Pts	Ref
Year	Make	R1	R2	R1	R2	R1	R2	R1	R2	R1	R2	R1	R2	R1	R2	R1	R2	R1	R2	R1	R2	Pos	Pts	Ref
1996	Yamaha	DON; Ret	DON; Ret	THR; 2	THR; 2	OUL; 1	OUL; 2	SNE; 1	SNE; 1	BHGP; 1	BHGP; 1	KNO; 2	KNO; 2	CAD; 1	CAD; 1	MAL; 1	MAL; 1	BHGP; 4	BHGP; 5	DON; 3	DON; 1	**2nd**	**390**	

=== Superbike World Championship results ===
(key) (Races in bold indicate pole position) (Races in italics indicate fastest lap)

Year	Make	1		2		3		4		5		6		7		8		9		10		11		12		Pos	Pts
Year	Make	R1	R2	R1	R2	R1	R2	R1	R2	R1	R2	R1	R2	R1	R2	R1	R2	R1	R2	R1	R2	R1	R2	R1	R2	Pos	Pts
1993	Yamaha	IRL Ret	IRL Ret	GER	GER	ESP 11	ESP 11	SMR	SMR	AUT	AUT	CZE	CZE	SWE 5	SWE Ret	MAL	MAL	JAP	JAP	NED 5	NED 5	ITA Ret	ITA Ret	GBR Ret	GBR 3	16th	58
1994	Ducati					SMR; 11	SMR; Ret	ESP; 3	ESP; 3	AUT; 7	AUT; Ret	INA; 1	INA; 4	JPN; Ret	JPN; 10	NED; 5	NED; 5	ITA; 8	ITA; 4	GBR; Ret	GBR; Ret	AUS; Ret	AUS; Ret			7th	129
1995	Ducati					GBR; 3	GBR; 8																			22nd	24
1996	Yamaha					GER; Ret	GER; 10	ITA; 7	ITA; 6					GBR; Ret	GBR; Ret					NED; 6	NED; 14					17th	37
1997	Suzuki	AUS; Ret	AUS; 13	SMR; Ret	SMR; Ret	GBR; 8	GBR; 10	GER; 14	GER; 3	ITA; 6	ITA; 3	USA; 8	USA; Ret	GBR; 7	GBR; 9	AUT; 10	AUT; 6	NED; 7	NED; 11	ESP; Ret	ESP; 10			INA; 9	INA; 6	8th	140
1998	Suzuki	AUS; Ret	AUS; 12	GBR; 8	GBR; 8	ITA; 8	ITA; 5	ESP; 11	ESP; 10	GER; 9	GER; 10	SMR; 6	SMR; Ret	RSA; 4	RSA; Ret	USA; 6	USA; 5	GBR; 5	GBR; 3	AUT; 5	AUT; 6	NED; Ret	NED; 5	JPN; 9	JPN; 11	8th	173

== Bibliography ==
- Whitham, James; McDiarmid, Mac (1 October 2008). James Whitham: What a Good Do!. Haynes Publishing. ISBN 978-1844254927.
