= 1992 Superbike World Championship =

1992 Superbike World Championship
Previous:	1991	Next:	1993

The 1992 Superbike World Championship was the fifth FIM Superbike World Championship season. The season started on 5 April at Albacete and finished on 25 October at Manfeild after 13 rounds.

Doug Polen won the riders' championship with 9 victories and Ducati won the manufacturers' championship.

== Race calendar and results ==
1992 Superbike World Championship Calendar
Round		Circuit	Date	Pole position	Fastest lap	Winning rider	Winning team	Report
1	R1	(Spain) Albacete	5 April	(Italy) Giancarlo Falappa	(New Zealand) Aaron Slight	(New Zealand) Aaron Slight	Team Moving Kawasaki	Report
1	R2	(Spain) Albacete	5 April	(Italy) Giancarlo Falappa	(Spain) Daniel Amatriain	(France) Raymond Roche	Team Raymond Roche Ducati	Report
2	R1	(United Kingdom) Donington	20 April	(United Kingdom) Carl Fogarty	(United Kingdom) Carl Fogarty	(France) Raymond Roche	Team Raymond Roche Ducati	Report
2	R2	(United Kingdom) Donington	20 April	(United Kingdom) Carl Fogarty	(United Kingdom) Carl Fogarty	(United Kingdom) Carl Fogarty	[Fogarty]	Report
3	R1	(Germany) Hockenheim	10 May	(United States) Doug Polen	(Italy) Fabrizio Pirovano	(United States) Doug Polen	Team Police Ducati	Report
3	R2	(Germany) Hockenheim	10 May	(United States) Doug Polen	(Australia) Rob Phillis	(United States) Doug Polen	Team Police Ducati	Report
4	R1	(Belgium) Spa Francorchamps	24 May	(Italy) Giancarlo Falappa	(United States) Doug Polen	(Australia) Rob Phillis	Team Moving Kawasaki	Report
4	R2	(Belgium) Spa Francorchamps	24 May	(Italy) Giancarlo Falappa	(United States) Doug Polen	(United States) Doug Polen	Team Police Ducati	Report
5	R1	(Spain) Jarama	21 June	(United States) Doug Polen	(Italy) Fabrizio Pirovano	(Australia) Rob Phillis	Team Moving Kawasaki	Report
5	R2	(Spain) Jarama	21 June	(United States) Doug Polen	(United States) Doug Polen	(United States) Doug Polen	Team Police Ducati	Report
6	R1	(Austria) Österreichring	28 June	(France) Raymond Roche	(Italy) Giancarlo Falappa	(Italy) Giancarlo Falappa	Team Police Ducati	Report
6	R2	(Austria) Österreichring	28 June	(France) Raymond Roche	(Australia) Rob Phillis	(Italy) Giancarlo Falappa	Team Police Ducati	Report
7	R1	(Italy) Mugello	19 July	(France) Raymond Roche	(France) Raymond Roche	(France) Raymond Roche	Team Raymond Roche Ducati	Report
7	R2	(Italy) Mugello	19 July	(France) Raymond Roche	(France) Raymond Roche	(France) Raymond Roche	Team Raymond Roche Ducati	Report
8	R1	(Malaysia) Johor	23 August	(Italy) Giancarlo Falappa	(Australia) Trevor Jordan	(France) Raymond Roche	Team Raymond Roche Ducati	Report
8	R2	(Malaysia) Johor	23 August	(Italy) Giancarlo Falappa	(France) Raymond Roche	(United States) Doug Polen	Team Police Ducati	Report
9	R1	(Japan) Sugo	30 August	(United States) Doug Polen	(Italy) Fabrizio Pirovano	(United States) Doug Polen	Team Police Ducati	Report
9	R2	(Japan) Sugo	30 August	(United States) Doug Polen	(Australia) Kevin Magee	(United States) Doug Polen	Team Police Ducati	Report
10	R1	(Netherlands) Assen	13 September	(United States) Doug Polen	(France) Raymond Roche	(United States) Doug Polen	Team Police Ducati	Report
10	R2	(Netherlands) Assen	13 September	(United States) Doug Polen	(France) Raymond Roche	(Italy) Giancarlo Falappa	Team Police Ducati	Report
11	R1	(Italy) Monza	29 September	(United States) Doug Polen	(Italy) Fabrizio Pirovano	(Italy) Fabrizio Pirovano	Diemme Racing Team	Report
11	R2	(Italy) Monza	29 September	(United States) Doug Polen	(Italy) Fabrizio Pirovano	(Italy) Fabrizio Pirovano	Diemme Racing Team	Report
12	R1	(Australia) Phillip Island	18 October	(United States) Doug Polen	(New Zealand) Aaron Slight	(Australia) Kevin Magee	Peter Jackson Yamaha Racing	Report
12	R2	(Australia) Phillip Island	18 October	(United States) Doug Polen	(New Zealand) Aaron Slight	(France) Raymond Roche	Team Raymond Roche Ducati	Report
13	R1	(New Zealand) Manfeild	25 October	(Italy) Giancarlo Falappa	(New Zealand) Aaron Slight	(United States) Doug Polen	Team Police Ducati	Report
13	R2	(New Zealand) Manfeild	25 October	(Italy) Giancarlo Falappa	(United States) Doug Polen	(Italy) Giancarlo Falappa	Team Police Ducati	Report

== Championship standings ==
=== Riders' standings ===
Rank	Rider	Manufacturer	Points	Wins
1	(United States) Doug Polen	(Italy) Ducati	371	9
2	(France) Raymond Roche	(Italy) Ducati	336	6
3	(Australia) Rob Phillis	(Japan) Kawasaki	288	2
4	(Italy) Giancarlo Falappa	(Italy) Ducati	279	4
5	(Italy) Fabrizio Pirovano	(Japan) Yamaha	278	2
6	(New Zealand) Aaron Slight	(Japan) Kawasaki	249	1
7	(Belgium) Stéphane Mertens	(Italy) Ducati	182	0
8	(Spain) Daniel Amatriain	(Italy) Ducati	156	0
9	(United Kingdom) Carl Fogarty	(Italy) Ducati	134	1
10	(Italy) Piergiorgio Bontempi	(Japan) Kawasaki	125	0
11	(United States) Scott Russell	(Japan) Kawasaki	83	0
12	(Australia) Kevin Magee	(Japan) Yamaha	71	1
13	(United States) Fred Merkel	(Japan) Yamaha	65	0
14	(Sweden) Christer Lindholm	(Japan) Yamaha	50	0
15	(France) Adrien Morillas	(Japan) Yamaha	46	0
16	(Italy) Davide Tardozzi	(Italy) Ducati	44	0
17	(Italy) Baldassarre Monti	(Japan) Honda	41	0
18	(Italy) Virginio Ferrari	(Italy) Ducati	35	0
19	(Switzerland) Andreas Hofmann	(Japan) Kawasaki	31	0
	(Netherlands) Jeffrey de Vries	(Japan) Yamaha	31	0
21	(France) Jehan d'Orgeix	(Japan) Kawasaki	28	0
22	(United Kingdom) John Reynolds	(Japan) Kawasaki	26	0
23	(Italy) Fabrizio Furlan	(Italy) Ducati	25	0
24	(Japan) Shouichi Tsukamoto	(Japan) Kawasaki	24	0
25	(Australia) Scott Doohan	(Japan) Yamaha	22	0
	(Italy) Richard Arnaiz	(Japan) Honda	22	0
27	(Australia) Mat Mladin	(Japan) Kawasaki	21	0
	(France) Hervé Moineau	(Japan) Suzuki	21	0
29	(Finland) Jari Suhonen	(Japan) Yamaha	19	0
30	(Japan) Keiichi Kitagawa	(Japan) Kawasaki	18	0
31	(France) Jean-Yves Mounier	(Japan) Yamaha	17	0
32	(Switzerland) Roger Kellenberger	(Japan) Yamaha	15	0
33	(United Kingdom) Terry Rymer	(Japan) Kawasaki	14	0
	(Australia) Troy Corser	(Japan) Yamaha	14	0
35	(Australia) Christopher Haldane	(Japan) Yamaha	13	0
	(Austria) Andreas Meklau	(Italy) Ducati	13	0
	(Australia) Michael O'Connor	(Japan) Honda	13	0
	(Japan) Takahiro Sohwa	(Japan) Kawasaki	13	0
39	(New Zealand) Simon Crafar	(Japan) Honda	12	0
40	(Italy) Valerio Destefanis	(Italy) Ducati	11	0
	(Italy) Mauro Lucchiari	(Japan) Yamaha	11	0

=== Manufacturers' standings ===
Pos	Manufacturer	Pts
1	(Italy) Ducati	502
2	(Japan) Kawasaki	385
3	(Japan) Yamaha	335
4	(Japan) Honda	80
5	(Japan) Suzuki	40
