= Giancarlo Falappa =

Italian motorcycle racer

- Nationality: Italian
- Born: 30 June 1963 (age 63); Filottrano
Motorcycle racing career statistics
Superbike World Championship
Active years	1989 - 1994
Starts / Wins / Podiums / Poles / F. laps / Points; 106 / 16 / 30 / 8 / 11 / 954

Giancarlo Falappa (born 30 June 1963) is an Italian former professional motorcycle road racer. He was nicknamed the Lion of Jesi because of his fearsome riding style.

== Motorcycle racing career ==
Falappa was born in Filottrano in the Province of Ancona and then moved to Jesi with his family. He began his racing career in motocross before making the switch to road racing in 1988. In 1989, he moved up to the Superbike World Championship riding for Bimota, winning three races and finishing the season in sixth place. Falappa moved to the Ducati team in 1990. His best result was a fourth-place finish in the 1992 season and a fifth place in the 1993 season (winning seven races, including the season's first three).

In 1994, Falappa crashed while testing a factory Ducati 916 and suffered serious head injuries. After being in a lengthy coma, he eventually recovered, but never raced again. He won a total of 16 races in his Superbike World Championship career, including the last race he ever competed in.

== Career statistics ==
=== Superbike World Championship ===
==== Races by year ====
(key) (Races in bold indicate pole position) (Races in italics indicate fastest lap)

Year	Make	1		2		3		4		5		6		7		8		9		10		11		12		13		Pos.	Pts
Year	Make	R1	R2	R1	R2	R1	R2	R1	R2	R1	R2	R1	R2	R1	R2	R1	R2	R1	R2	R1	R2	R1	R2	R1	R2	R1	R2	Pos.	Pts
1989	Bimota	GBR; 17	GBR; 1	HUN; 9	HUN; 4	CAN; Ret	CAN; 1	USA; Ret	USA; Ret	AUT; 13	AUT; Ret	FRA; 5	FRA; 1	JPN; 4	JPN; 3	GER; Ret	GER; 2	**ITA**; Ret	**ITA**; DNS	AUS	AUS	NZL	NZL					6th	139
1990	Ducati	SPA; 5	SPA; 2	**GBR**; 7	**GBR**; 1	HUN; Ret	HUN; 7	GER; 3	GER; 4	**CAN**; Ret	**CAN**; DNS	USA	USA	AUT; DNS	AUT; DNS	JPN	JPN	FRA	FRA	ITA	ITA	MAL	MAL	AUS	AUS	NZL	NZL	11th	94
1991	Ducati	GBR; 14	GBR; Ret	SPA; Ret	SPA; Ret	CAN	CAN	USA; 7	USA; Ret	AUT; Ret	AUT; 7	SMR; 10	SMR; 6	SWE; 6	SWE; 13	JPN; 10	JPN; 11	MAL; 6	MAL; Ret	GER; 6	GER; 3	FRA; Ret	FRA; 8	ITA; 6	ITA; Ret	AUS	AUS	9th	113
1992	Ducati	**SPA**; 4	**SPA**; 5	GBR; 16	GBR; 8	GER; 19	GER; 3	**BEL**; 4	**BEL**; 2	SPA; 3	SPA; 7	AUT; 1	AUT; 1	ITA; 3	ITA; 2	**MAL**; 6	**MAL**; 4	JPN; Ret	JPN; 6	NED; 8	NED; 1	ITA; 12	ITA; 6	AUS; 5	AUS; Ret	**NZL**; Ret	**NZL**; 1	4th	279
1993	Ducati	IRL; 1	IRL; 1	GER; 1	GER; 3	SPA; Ret	SPA; Ret	**SMR**; 1	**SMR**; 1	AUT; 6	AUT; 1	CZE; 5	CZE; Ret	SWE; 2	SWE; 3	MAL; Ret	MAL; Ret	JPN; 5	JPN; Ret	NED; Ret	NED; 7	ITA; Ret	ITA; 1	GBR; Ret	GBR; 5	POR; 4	POR; 4	5th	255
1994	Ducati	GBR; 5	GBR; 4	GER; Ret	GER; 4	ITA; 2	ITA; 1	SPA	SPA	AUT	AUT	INA	INA	JPN	JPN	NED	NED	SMR	SMR	EUR	EUR	AUS	AUS					15th	74
