= 1995 Superbike World Championship =

1995 Superbike World Championship
Previous:	1994	Next:	1996

The 1995 Superbike World Championship was the eighth FIM Superbike World Championship season. The season started on 7 May at Hockenheim and finished on 29 October at Phillip Island after 12 rounds.

Carl Fogarty won the riders' championship with 13 victories and Ducati won the manufacturers' championship. The season was marred by the death of Yasutomo Nagai as a result of injuries sustained in an accident during the Assen round.

== Race calendar and results ==
1995 Superbike World Championship Calendar
Round		Circuit	Date	Pole position	Fastest lap	Winning rider	Winning team	Report
1	R1	(Germany) Hockenheim	7 May	(Australia) Troy Corser	(United Kingdom) Carl Fogarty	(United Kingdom) Carl Fogarty	Ducati Corse Virginio Ferrari	Report
1	R2	(Germany) Hockenheim	7 May	(Australia) Troy Corser	(United Kingdom) Carl Fogarty	(United Kingdom) Carl Fogarty	Ducati Corse Virginio Ferrari	Report
2	R1	(San Marino) Misano	21 May	(United Kingdom) Carl Fogarty	(Italy) Mauro Lucchiari	(Italy) Mauro Lucchiari	Ducati Corse Virginio Ferrari	Report
2	R2	(San Marino) Misano	21 May	(United Kingdom) Carl Fogarty	(Italy) Mauro Lucchiari	(Italy) Mauro Lucchiari	Ducati Corse Virginio Ferrari	Report
3	R1	(United Kingdom) Donington	28 May	(United Kingdom) Carl Fogarty	(United Kingdom) Carl Fogarty	(United Kingdom) Carl Fogarty	Ducati Corse Virginio Ferrari	Report
3	R2	(United Kingdom) Donington	28 May	(United Kingdom) Carl Fogarty	(United Kingdom) Carl Fogarty	(United Kingdom) Carl Fogarty	Ducati Corse Virginio Ferrari	Report
4	R1	(Italy) Monza	18 June	(New Zealand) Aaron Slight	(United Kingdom) Carl Fogarty	(United Kingdom) Carl Fogarty	Ducati Corse Virginio Ferrari	Report
4	R2	(Italy) Monza	18 June	(New Zealand) Aaron Slight	(Italy) Pierfrancesco Chili	(Italy) Pierfrancesco Chili	Team Gattolone	Report
5	R1	(Spain) Albacete	25 June	(Australia) Troy Corser	(Italy) Pierfrancesco Chili	(New Zealand) Aaron Slight	Castrol Honda	Report
5	R2	(Spain) Albacete	25 June	(Australia) Troy Corser	(Italy) Pierfrancesco Chili	(United Kingdom) Carl Fogarty	Ducati Corse Virginio Ferrari	Report
6	R1	(Austria) Salzburgring	9 July	(Japan) Yasutomo Nagai	(United Kingdom) Carl Fogarty	(United Kingdom) Carl Fogarty	Ducati Corse Virginio Ferrari	Report
6	R2	(Austria) Salzburgring	9 July	(Japan) Yasutomo Nagai	(Japan) Yasutomo Nagai	(Australia) Troy Corser	Promotor Racing	Report
7	R1	(United States) Laguna Seca	23 July	(Australia) Troy Corser	(Australia) Troy Corser	(Australia) Anthony Gobert	Team Kawasaki Muzzy	Report
7	R2	(United States) Laguna Seca	23 July	(Australia) Troy Corser	(Australia) Troy Corser	(Australia) Troy Corser	Promotor Racing	Report
8	R1	(Europe) Brands Hatch	6 August	(United Kingdom) Carl Fogarty	(United States) Colin Edwards	(United Kingdom) Carl Fogarty	Ducati Corse Virginio Ferrari	Report
8	R2	(Europe) Brands Hatch	6 August	(United Kingdom) Carl Fogarty	(United Kingdom) Carl Fogarty	(United Kingdom) Carl Fogarty	Ducati Corse Virginio Ferrari	Report
9	R1	(Japan) Sugo	27 August	(United Kingdom) Carl Fogarty	(Japan) Takuma Aoki	(Australia) Troy Corser	Promotor Racing	Report
9	R2	(Japan) Sugo	27 August	(United Kingdom) Carl Fogarty	(United Kingdom) Carl Fogarty	(United Kingdom) Carl Fogarty	Ducati Corse Virginio Ferrari	Report
10	R1	(Netherlands) Assen	10 September	(Australia) Troy Corser	(Italy) Pierfrancesco Chili	(United Kingdom) Carl Fogarty	Ducati Corse Virginio Ferrari	Report
10	R2	(Netherlands) Assen	10 September	(Australia) Troy Corser	(United Kingdom) Carl Fogarty	(United Kingdom) Carl Fogarty	Ducati Corse Virginio Ferrari	Report
11	R1	(Indonesia) Sentul	15 October	(New Zealand) Aaron Slight	(Australia) Troy Corser	(United Kingdom) Carl Fogarty	Ducati Corse Virginio Ferrari	Report
11	R2	(Indonesia) Sentul	15 October	(New Zealand) Aaron Slight	(New Zealand) Aaron Slight	(New Zealand) Aaron Slight	Castrol Honda	Report
12	R1	(Australia) Phillip Island	29 October	(Australia) Anthony Gobert	(New Zealand) Aaron Slight	(Australia) Troy Corser	Promotor Racing	Report
12	R2	(Australia) Phillip Island	29 October	(Australia) Anthony Gobert	(Australia) Troy Corser	(Australia) Anthony Gobert	Team Kawasaki Muzzy	Report

== Championship standings ==
=== Riders' standings ===
1995 final riders' standings
Pos.	Rider	Bike	GER (Germany)		ITA (Italy)		GBR (United Kingdom)		SMR (San Marino)		ESP (Spain)		AUT (Austria)		USA (United States)		EUR (Europe)		JPN (Japan)		NED (Netherlands)		INA (Indonesia)		AUS (Australia)		Pts
Pos.	Rider	Bike	R1	R2	R1	R2	R1	R2	R1	R2	R1	R2	R1	R2	R1	R2	R1	R2	R1	R2	R1	R2	R1	R2	R1	R2	Pts
1	(United Kingdom) Fogarty	Ducati	1	1	**2**	**2**	**1**	**1**	1	2	2	1	1	2	5	7	**1**	**1**	**Ret**	**1**	1	1	1	Ret	4	2	478
2	(Australia) Corser	Ducati	**10**	**8**	3	3	2	Ret	Ret	Ret	**3**	**5**	3	1	**2**	**1**	2	6	1	8	**3**	**Ret**	2	2	1	3	339
3	(New Zealand) Slight	Honda	6	3	16	13	4	3	**2**	**3**	1	3	4	4	9	Ret	9	8	2	4	4	2	**3**	**1**	2	4	323
4	(Australia) Gobert	Kawasaki	16	Ret	6	16	10	Ret	Ret	12	7	DNS	2	3	1	2	3	5	5	9	9	7	4	4	**Ret**	**1**	222
5	(Japan) Nagai	Yamaha	4	4	13	18	14	7	5	4	9	6	**5**	**6**	10	5	Ret	4	3	2	7	5					188
6	(New Zealand) Crafar	Honda	9	6	9	10	8	6	4	7	11	10	14	9	6	6	10	10	10	15	2	Ret	22	6	3	5	187
7	(Italy) Pirovano	Ducati	2	13	5	6	11	5	8	8	6	4	8	5	Ret	8	7	7	13	Ret	10	Ret	5	6	Ret	12	178
8	(Italy) Chili	Ducati	15	9	4	4	Ret	2	Ret	1	4	2	11	Ret	Ret	Ret	6	Ret	15	Ret	Ret	DNS	Ret	3	6	10	160
9	(Italy) Lucchiari	Ducati	Ret	7	1	1	9	10	6	6	Ret	Ret	13	7	14	14	11	11	20	Ret	5	4	7	11	Ret	Ret	156
10	(United Kingdom) Reynolds	Kawasaki	17	Ret	7	9	7	11	9	10	12	8	Ret	Ret	16	Ret	4	3	9	12	6	3	9	9	5	7	155
11	(United States) Edwards	Yamaha	7	5	Ret	Ret	18	12	3	5	10	11	9	Ret	8	9	5	2	6	10	Ret	6					141
12	(Italy) Bontempi	Kawasaki	11	14	8	5	5	4	7	Ret	5	Ret	10	8	13	11	13	14	14	13	12	9	11	8	12	8	138
13	(Austria) Meklau	Ducati	Ret	11	11	7	Ret	14	Ret	9	8	7	6	Ret	18	Ret	Ret	17	16	18	13	Ret	8	10	18	18	72
14	(Germany) Schmid	Kawasaki	3	2	15	12	13	17					7	Ret	Ret	Ret					14	8	13	12	17	15	71
15	(United States) Hale	Honda													4	3											60
15	(United States) Hale	Ducati																					6	7	14	6	60
16	(Italy) Casoli	Yamaha	Ret	15	Ret	19	15	13	Ret	13	13	9	12	10	Ret	15	12	13			8	10					50
17	(Japan) Kitagawa	Kawasaki	5	12															4	6							38
18	(United States) Russell	Kawasaki	8	10	14	8	6	DNS																			34
19	(Canada) Duhamel	Honda													3	4											29
20	(France) Morillas	Ducati	13	Ret	12	14	12	9	Ret	Ret	14	Ret	Ret	14	Ret	DNS	Ret	12	Ret	Ret	Ret	Ret					28
21	(Italy) Liverani	Ducati	Ret	18	10	11	17	16	10	Ret	15	14	15	Ret	Ret	Ret	15	19	Ret	24	DNS	14	18	15			25
22	(United Kingdom) Whitham	Ducati					3	8																			24
23	(United Kingdom) Hislop	Ducati			Ret	15	Ret	Ret									8	9			11	Ret					21
24	(Japan) Yoshikawa	Yamaha																	7	5							20
25	(United States) Spencer	Ducati													7	Ret							14	Ret	7	Ret	20
26	(United Kingdom) Morrison	Ducati					21	22									NC	20			15	11	10	Ret	Ret	11	17
27	(Japan) K. Fujiwara	Kawasaki																	17	3							16
28	(Italy) Meregalli	Yamaha	12	16	Ret	Ret	20	Ret	Ret	11	Ret	12	20	15			18	21			18	Ret					14
29	(Australia) Giles	Ducati																							10	9	13
30	(Japan) N. Fujiwara	Yamaha																	8	14							10
31	(Japan) Aoki	Honda																	Ret	7							9
32	(United Kingdom) Jefferies	Kawasaki	25	22	20	26	19	19	13	Ret	16	13	Ret	18	Ret	16	14	15	19	20	DNS	DNS					9
33	(Australia) McCarthy	Honda																							8	Ret	8
34	(Japan) Tsujimoto	Honda									11	14	18	15													8
35	(Australia) Mladin	Kawasaki																					Ret	Ret	9	Ret	7
36	(Canada) Picotte	Kawasaki															15	10									7
37	(Australia) Goddard	Suzuki																					12	13			7
38	(United States) Kipp	Yamaha															12	13									7
39	(France) Mounier	Ducati	Ret	Ret			Ret	23	14	17	17	Ret	18	Ret							17	12					6
40	(Australia) Craggill	Kawasaki																							13	13	6
41	(New Zealand) McEwen	Ducati																							11	Ret	5
42	(Japan) Takeishi	Honda																	Ret	11							5
43	(Japan) Ryō	Kawasaki																	11	17							5
44	(United States) Smith	Ducati													11	Ret											5
45	(Germany) Bradl	Kawasaki											16	11													5
46	(Japan) Nukumi	Ducati																	12	16							4
47	(Canada) Crevier	Kawasaki													17	12											4
48	(Germany) Liedl	Kawasaki	21	19									17	12													4
49	(Italy) Gallina	Ducati	18	20	Ret	25			12	Ret																	4
50	(Netherlands) Pajic	Kawasaki																			Ret	13					3
51	(Germany) Rudroff	Ducati											19	13													3
52	(Australia) Baird	Honda																							15	14	3
53	(Switzerland) Briguet	Honda																			19	Ret	15	14	Ret	Ret	3
54	(Switzerland) Weibel	Ducati	14	Ret																							2
55	(Italy) Di Maso	Ducati	Ret	DNS	23	21			15	15	21	Ret									20	16					2
56	(Germany) Kaufmann	Yamaha																			16	15					1
57	(United Kingdom) Llewellyn	Ducati					16	15									Ret	16									1
57	(United Kingdom) Llewellyn	Bimota																			DNQ	DNQ					1
	(Indonesia) Nugraha	Suzuki																					DNS	DNS			0
	(Indonesia) Bar	Kawasaki																					DNQ	DNQ			0
	(Indonesia) Sudarsono	Suzuki																					DNQ	DNQ			0
	(Indonesia) Karnada	Yamaha																					DNQ	DNQ			0
	(Indonesia) Otto	Kawasaki																					DNQ	DNQ			0
	(Indonesia) Arsyad	Kawasaki																					DNQ	DNQ			0
	(Indonesia) Husodo	Kawasaki																					DNQ	DNQ			0
	(Indonesia) Kusuma	Suzuki																					DNQ	DNQ			0
Pos.	Rider	Bike	GER (Germany)		ITA (Italy)		GBR (United Kingdom)		SMR (San Marino)		ESP (Spain)		AUT (Austria)		USA (United States)		EUR (Europe)		JPN (Japan)		NED (Netherlands)		INA (Indonesia)		AUS (Australia)		Pts

Colour	Result
Gold	Winner
Silver	Second place
Bronze	Third place
Green	Points classification
Blue	Non-points classification
Blue	Non-classified finish (NC)
Purple	Retired, not classified (Ret)
Red	Did not qualify (DNQ)
Red	Did not pre-qualify (DNPQ)
Black	Disqualified (DSQ)
White	Did not start (DNS)
White	Withdrew (WD)
White	Race cancelled (C)
Blank	Did not practice (DNP)
Blank	Did not arrive (DNA)
Blank	Excluded (EX)

**Bold** – Pole position
Italics – Fastest lap

=== Manufacturers' standings ===
1995 final manufacturers' standings
Pos.	Manufacturer	GER (Germany)		ITA (Italy)		GBR (United Kingdom)		SMR (San Marino)		ESP (Spain)		AUT (Austria)		USA (United States)		EUR (Europe)		JPN (Japan)		NED (Netherlands)		INA (Indonesia)		AUS (Australia)		Pts
Pos.	Manufacturer	R1	R2	R1	R2	R1	R2	R1	R2	R1	R2	R1	R2	R1	R2	R1	R2	R1	R2	R1	R2	R1	R2	R1	R2	Pts
1	(Italy) Ducati	1	1	1	1	1	1	1	1	2	1	1	1	2	1	1	1	1	1	1	1	1	2	1	2	580
2	(Japan) Honda	6	3	9	10	4	3	2	3	1	3	4	4	3	3	9	8	2	4	2	2	3	1	2	4	365
3	(Japan) Kawasaki	3	2	6	5	5	4	7	10	5	8	2	3	1	2	3	3	4	3	6	3	4	4	5	1	345
4	(Japan) Yamaha	4	4	13	18	14	7	3	4	6	9	5	6	8	5	5	2	3	2	7	5	DNQ	DNQ	24	22	213
5	(Japan) Suzuki	Ret	24	DNS	23			18	16			DNS	DNS					23	26			12	13	16	16	7
	(Italy) Bimota	DNQ	DNQ	26	Ret			17	Ret	Ret	DNS	23	Ret			Ret	Ret			DNQ	DNQ					0
Pos.	Manufacturer	GER (Germany)		ITA (Italy)		GBR (United Kingdom)		SMR (San Marino)		ESP (Spain)		AUT (Austria)		USA (United States)		EUR (Europe)		JPN (Japan)		NED (Netherlands)		INA (Indonesia)		AUS (Australia)		Pts
