= Terry Rymer =

British motorcycle racer

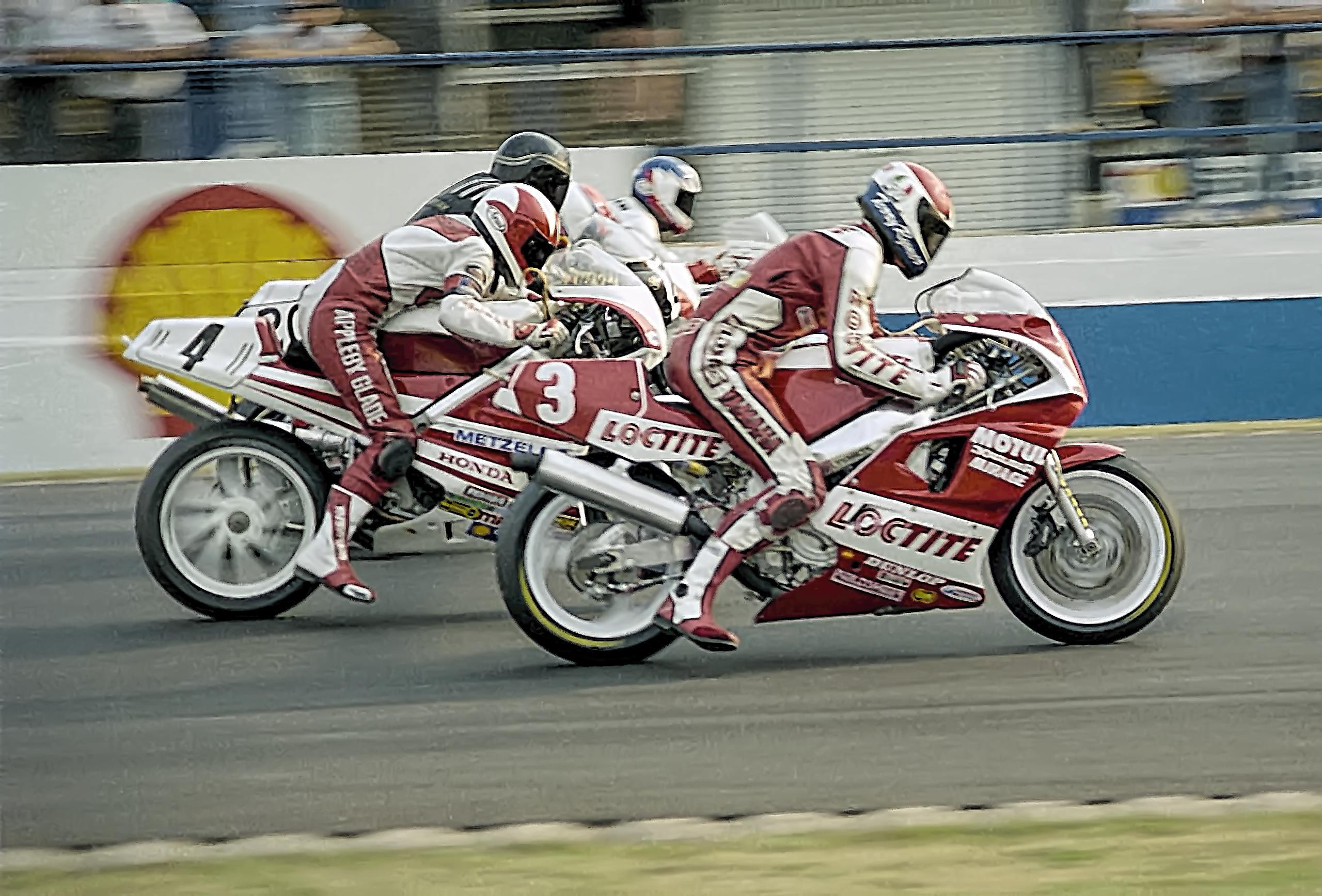
- Rymer (no. 3) at Donington Park in 1989
- Nationality: (United Kingdom) British
Motorcycle racing career statistics
Grand Prix motorcycle racing
Active years	1992, 1996
First race	1992 500cc British Grand Prix
Last race	1996 500cc Imola Grand Prix
Team(s)	Yamaha, Suzuki
Championships	0
Starts / Wins / Podiums / Poles / F. laps / Points; 8 / 0 / 0 / 0 / 0 / 22
Superbike World Championship
Active years	1988 – 1995, 1998
Manufacturers	Yamaha
1998 championship position	53rd
Starts / Wins / Podiums / Poles / F. laps / Points; 124 / 2 / 11 / 0 / 0

Terence William Rymer (born 28 February 1967) is an English former professional motorcycle road racer turned car and truck racer. Rymer won over 200 races in 20 years of competition during his motorcycle and car racing career.

== Motorcycle racing career ==
Born in Folkestone, Kent, England, Rymer won both BMCRC 250cc and 350cc Production Championships and also the KRC 250-350 Production Championships in 1985. Rymer also won the Marlboro Clubmans final round at the Silverstone Circuit which was the best of the cream of the fastest club racers in the UK in the final round. He turned semi-professional in 1987 winning British National races, 1988 saw him turning professional, racing in International events globally.

In 1989, Rymer won his first Superbike World Championship race in New Zealand, the first ever British rider to win at a World Superbike event and came runner up in the British Formula TT Championship. Rymer ended the 1989 season with a victory at the prestigious Mallory Park Race of the Year, a feat he would also repeat the next season.

In 1990, Rymer won the British Superbike Championship and repeated his victory at the Mallory Park Race of the Year. He also won the 1992 FIM Endurance World Championship, the 1993 European Superbike Championship and the 1999 Endurance World Championship once more. He was a regular although only completing two full-time seasons in the Superbike World Championship every year from 1988 to 1994 with two wins, nine further podiums, and a championship best of sixth in 1991.

Rymer raced the prestigious Suzuka 8 Hours race in Japan four times with a best result of second place with teammate Scott Russell in 1994, this was and is to this date the closest ever first to second finish in the 8 hour races history. He rode a privateer Harris-Yamaha at the 1992 British motorcycle Grand Prix and placed sixth. He made a handful of 500cc Grand Prix starts for the Suzuki factory in 1996. Subsequently, he returned to the British Superbike championship with some success – five race wins in 1996 with a Ducati, and one in 1998 for Suzuki. He won the prestigious Bol d'Or race five times, the 24 Hours of Le Mans and Spa 24 Hour motorcycle race twice.

Rymer retired from motorcycle racing aged 32 in 1999 after winning the Endurance World Championship for the second time and, embarked on a car and truck racing career spanning a further three years. He raced Porsche GT cars and a MAN truck, winning seven races and gaining many podium places in Britain and Europe, he also competed at the 12 Hours of Sebring race in Florida. Rymer still has involvement with motorcycle racing and has managed a number of professional riders, he also can be heard commentating motorcycle racing on Eurosport and seen at Circuits in throughout the UK and Europe racing for fun and Instructing at track days.

== Racing results ==
=== FIM Endurance World Championship ===
Year	Bike	Rider	TC
1992	Kawasaki ZXR-7	(United Kingdom) Terry Rymer (United Kingdom) Carl Fogarty	1st
1995	Kawasaki	(United Kingdom) Terry Rymer	2nd
1999	Suzuki	(United Kingdom) Terry Rymer (France) Jéhan d'Orgeix	1st

=== Complete British GT Championship results ===
(key) (Races in bold indicate pole position) (Races in italics indicate fastest lap)

Year	Team	Car	Class	1	2	3	4	5	6	7	8	9	10	11	12	Pos	Points
2000	PK Sport	Porsche 911 GT2	GT	THR; 1 Ret	CRO; 1 Ret											NC	0
2000	PK Sport	Porsche 911 GT3-R	GTO			OUL; 1; 5	DON; 1 Ret	SIL; 1; 6	BRH; 1 DNS	**DON**; **1**; 10	**CRO**; **1** DNS	**SIL**; **1**; 9	SNE; 1; 4	**SPA**; **1**; 6	**SIL**; **1**; 9	4th	91
