= Fabrizio Pirovano =

Italian motorcycle racer

- Nationality: Italian
Motorcycle racing career statistics
Superbike World Championship
Active years	1988–1995
Manufacturers	Yamaha, Ducati
1995 championship position	7th
Starts / Wins / Podiums / Poles / F. laps / Points; 181 / 10 / 47 / 0 / 13 / 1678.5
Supersport World Championship
Active years	1997–2001
Championships	1998
Starts / Wins / Podiums / Poles / F. laps / Points; 52 / 6 / 11 / 1 / 3 / 470

Fabrizio Pirovano (1 February 1960 – 12 June 2016) was an Italian professional motorcycle road racer from Biassono.

== Motorcycle racing career ==
When the Superbike World Championship began in 1988, Pirovano was one of its first entrants, finishing as championship runner-up in 1988 and 1990, and in the top five four other times. He won ten races and took 37 further podium finishes. He is in the championship's all-time top-ten for starts, points and podiums. Curiously he never took a World Superbike pole position. He won the Italian Superbike title four times.

By the mid-1990s, the World Superbike championship had more international stars (such as Troy Corser and Carl Fogarty) and Pirovano was less competitive. In 1995, a second-place finish at the season-opener at Hockenheim was his only podium, and he left the championship at the end of the year. He moved to the Open Championship for 1996, winning several races and remained there as it became the Supersport World Championship in 1997. He was champion with five wins in 1998, and finished in the top ten in the four other seasons he contested. In 2001 his best results were a pair of fifth places, and this proved to be his last full season. He won a one-off race in the Suzuki GSX-R Cup at the Misano Circuit in June 2006. He died after losing a battle against an incurable tumour on 12 June 2016.

== Career statistics ==
=== Grand Prix motorcycle racing ===
==== Races by year ====
(key) (Races in bold indicate pole position, races in italics indicate fastest lap)

Year	Class	Bike	1	2	3	4	5	6	7	8	9	10	11	12	13	14	15	Pos.	Pts
1987	250cc	Yamaha	JPN	SPA	GER	NAT; Ret	AUT	YUG	NED	FRA	GBR	SWE	CZE	RSM	POR	BRA	ARG	NC	0

=== Superbike World Championship ===
==== Races by year ====
(key) (Races in bold indicate pole position) (Races in italics indicate fastest lap)

Year	Make	1		2		3		4		5		6		7		8		9		10		11		12		13		Pos.	Pts
Year	Make	R1	R2	R1	R2	R1	R2	R1	R2	R1	R2	R1	R2	R1	R2	R1	R2	R1	R2	R1	R2	R1	R2	R1	R2	R1	R2	Pos.	Pts
1988	Yamaha	GBR; 8	GBR; 4	HUN; 5	HUN; 6	GER; 11	GER; 8	AUT; 2	AUT; 7	JPN; Ret	JPN; 10	FRA; 1	FRA; C	POR; 6	POR; 6	AUS; 6	AUS; 7	NZL; 2	NZL; 13									2nd	93.5
1989	Yamaha	GBR; 1	GBR; 18	HUN; 3	HUN; 2	CAN; 6	CAN; 5	USA; 2	USA; 4	AUT; 5	AUT; 2	FRA; Ret	FRA; Ret	JPN; 7	JPN; Ret	GER; 4	GER; 6	ITA; 3	ITA; 4	AUS; 3	AUS; Ret	NZL	NZL					4th	208
1990	Yamaha	SPA; 6	SPA; 8	GBR; 5	GBR; 5	HUN; 3	HUN; 8	GER; 8	GER; 5	CAN; 3	CAN; 5	USA; 8	USA; 6	AUT; 1	AUT; 3	JPN; 4	JPN; 4	FRA; Ret	FRA; 2	ITA; 1	ITA; 1	MAL; 1	MAL; 1	AUS; 2	AUS; 5	NZL; Ret	NZL; 4	2nd	337
1991	Yamaha	GBR; 3	GBR; 8	SPA; 5	SPA; 5	CAN	CAN	USA; 5	USA; 6	AUT; Ret	AUT; 5	SMR; 5	SMR; 4	SWE; 3	SWE; Ret	JPN; 7	JPN; 7	MAL; 2	MAL; 3	GER; Ret	GER; 7	FRA; 31	FRA; 6	ITA; Ret	ITA; 6	AUS	AUS	5th	195
1992	Yamaha	SPA; 3	SPA; 4	GBR; 2	GBR; 5	GER; Ret	GER; 6	BEL; Ret	BEL; 3	SPA; Ret	SPA; 3	AUT; 4	AUT; 6	ITA; 5	ITA; Ret	MAL; 2	MAL; 6	JPN; 3	JPN; 3	NED; 9	NED; 8	ITA; 1	ITA; 1	AUS; 12	AUS; 6	NZL; 5	NZL; 5	5th	278
1993	Yamaha	IRL; 17	IRL; 3	GER; 2	GER; 5	SPA; 4	SPA; 7	SMR; 3	SMR; 11	AUT; Ret	AUT; 18	CZE; 4	CZE; 4	SWE; 3	SWE; 4	MAL; 3	MAL; 3	JPN; 7	JPN; 5	NED; Ret	NED; 4	ITA; 3	ITA; 3	GBR; 4	GBR; 6	POR; 1	POR; 3	4th	290
1994	Ducati	GBR; 3	GBR; Ret	GER; Ret	GER; 2	ITA; Ret	ITA; 6	SPA; Ret	SPA; 11	AUT; 8	AUT; Ret	INA; 16	INA; Ret	JPN; 2	JPN; Ret	NED; Ret	NED; 11	SMR; 5	SMR; 5	EUR; Ret	EUR; 12	AUS; 22	AUS; 8					9th	111
1995	Ducati	GER; 2	GER; 13	SMR; 5	SMR; 6	GBR; 11	GBR; 5	ITA; 8	ITA; 8	SPA; 6	SPA; 4	AUT; 8	AUT; 5	USA; Ret	USA; 8	EUR; 7	EUR; 7	JPN; 13	JPN; DNS	NED; 10	NED; Ret	INA; 5	INA; 6	AUS; Ret	AUS; 12			7th	178

=== Supersport World Championship ===
==== Races by year ====
(key) (Races in bold indicate pole position) (Races in italics indicate fastest lap)

Year	Bike	1	2	3	4	5	6	7	8	9	10	11	Pos.	Pts
1997	Ducati	SMR; Ret	GBR; Ret	GER; 11	ITA; 1	EUR; 6	AUT; 2	NED; Ret	GER; Ret	SPA; 5	JPN; 3	INA; Ret	8th	87
1998	Suzuki	GBR; 6	ITA; 1	**SPA**; 1	GER; Ret	SMR; 1	RSA; 3	USA; Ret	EUR; 1	AUT; 1	NED; 2		1st	171
1999	Suzuki	RSA; Ret	GBR; Ret	SPA; 5	ITA; 5	GER; 2	SMR; 4	USA; 5	EUR; 8	AUT; Ret	NED	GER; 6	7th	84
2000	Suzuki	AUS; 9	JPN; 7	GBR	ITA; Ret	GER; 8	SMR; 5	SPA; 4	EUR; 11	NED; Ret	GER; Ret	GBR; 8	9th	61
2001	Suzuki	SPA; 9	AUS; Ret	JPN; 7	ITA; 8	GBR; 9	GER; Ret	SMR; Ret	EUR; 5	GER; 7	NED; 5	ITA; 11	10th	67

Sporting positions
Preceded by Paolo Casoli	World Supersport Champion; 1998	Succeeded by Stéphane Chambon
