= Rob Phillis =

Australian motorcycle racer

- Nationality: Australia
- Born: 27 April 1956 (age 70)
Motorcycle racing career statistics
Superbike World Championship
Active years	1988–1994, 1996
Manufacturers	Kawasaki, Yamaha
1996 championship position	32nd
Starts / Wins / Podiums / Poles / F. laps / Points; 108 / 4 / 27 / 3 / 6 / 949
Supersport World Championship
Active years	1998
Manufacturers	Bimota
1997 championship position
Starts / Wins / Podiums / Poles / F. laps / Points; 1 / 0 / 0 / 0 / 0 / 0

Robert Allan Phillis (born 27 April 1956) is an Australian retired motorcycle road racer. He began his motorcycling career competing in dirt bike and motocross events before crossing over to road racing in 1974. He won the Australian Superbike and Australian Endurance title in 1987 and also won the Australian 1000cc title in 1989 riding a ZXR750 Kawasaki winning himself a sponsorship from Team Kawasaki Australia in the 1990 Superbike World Championship.

Phillis began competing at the international level full-time, finishing third overall in 1991 and 1992 on a Kawasaki. In his career, he totalled four wins, 23 other podiums, three poles and six fastest laps. He remained close friends with Aaron Slight, his teammate at the time, and was Slight's first visitor following his near-fatal brain problem in 2000. Phillis retired from top-level racing in 1998 at the age of 42.
