= Peter Goddard (motorcyclist) =

Australian motorcycle racer

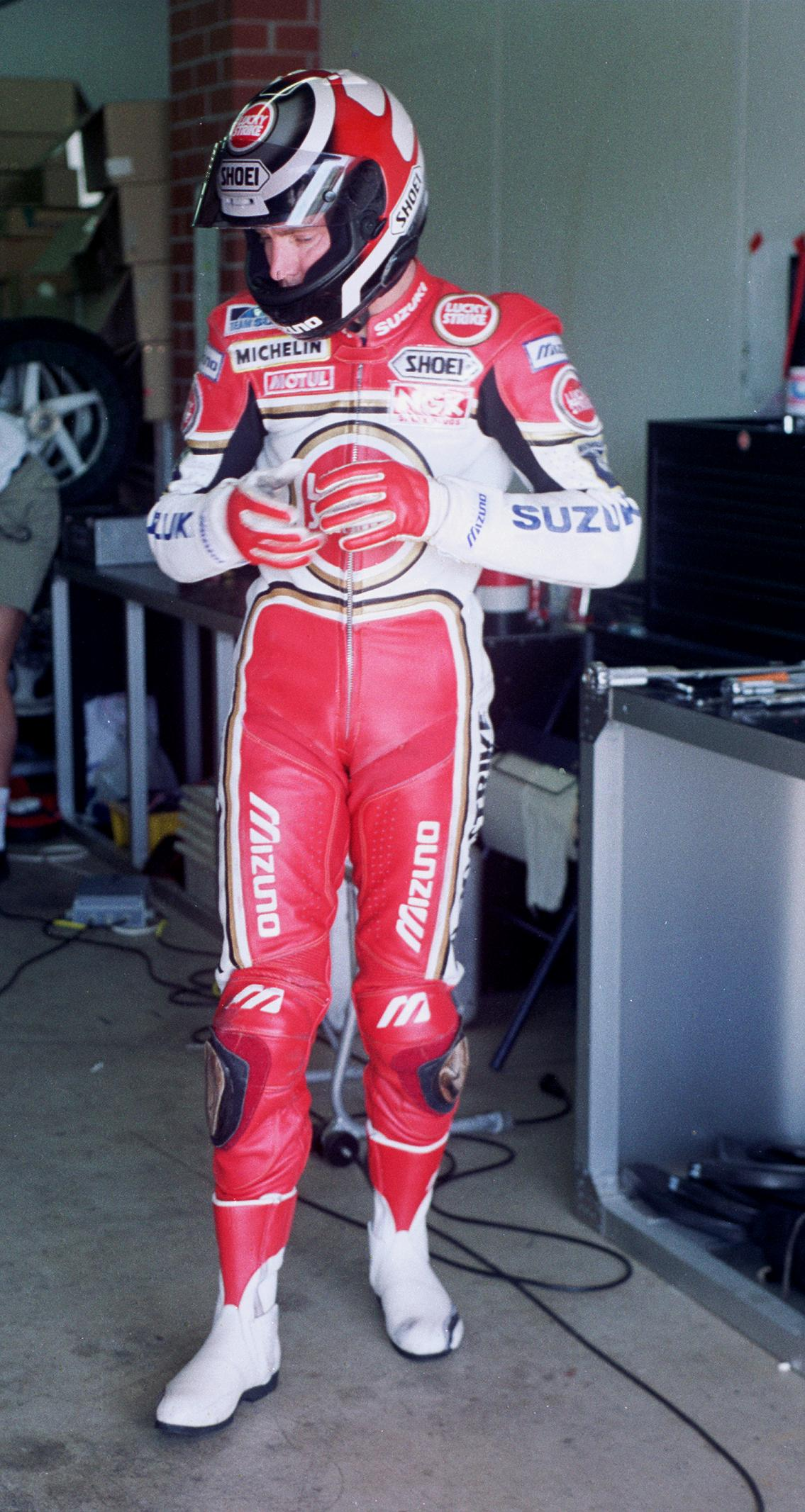
- Peter Goddard, pictured during the 1993 Australian Grand Prix
- Nationality: Australian
- Born: 28 June 1964 (age 62)
Motorcycle racing career statistics
Grand Prix motorcycle racing
Active years	1990 - 1997
First race	1990 500cc Australian Grand Prix
Last race	1997 500cc Australian Grand Prix
Team	Honda Suzuki Yamaha
Championships	0
Starts / Wins / Podiums / Poles / F. laps / Points; 17 / 0 / 0 / 0 / 0 / 48
Superbike World Championship
Active years	1989 - 1991, 1994 - 2002
Manufacturers	Yamaha, Suzuki, Benelli
Championships	0
2002 championship position	22nd
Starts / Wins / Podiums / Poles / F. laps / Points; 102 / 2 / 4 / 1 / 1 / 449

Peter Rodney Goddard (born 28 June 1964) is a former Grand Prix motorcycle road racer. He resides in Wollongong, New South Wales, Australia. Riding motorcycles since the age of five, Goddard started his racing career on dirt tracks before making his debut on road circuits at Oran Park Raceway in 1984.

== Dirt track racing career ==
1982:

- 1st Australian 125 Dirt-Track Championship, Launceston
- 2nd Australian 250 Dirt-Track Championship, Launceston

1986:

- 1st Australian 250 Dirt-Track Championship, Maryborough
- 1st Australian 250 Track Championship, Port Pirie
- 1st Australian 500 Dirt-Track Championship, Port Pirie

== Road racing career ==
Road Race debut: 1984, Oran Park, New South Wales, Australia

World Superbike Debut: 1989, Oran Park, Australia

World Superbike Wins: 2 (Oran Park, Australia 1989; Phillip Island, Australia 1990) 500cc GP Debut: 1990 Australian Grand Prix, Phillip Island

500cc GP Starts: 17 (1990–97) Best 500cc GP Result: 5th, British Grand Prix, Donington Park, 1992

2002 Race Team Benelli Sport (World Superbike Championship) 2001 Race Team Benelli Sport (World Superbike Championship) 2000 Race Team Kawasaki (British & World Superbike Championships) 1999 Race Team: Aprilia Racing Team (World Superbike Championship) 1998 Race Team: WSBK Suzuki (World Superbike Championship) 1997 Race Team: Suzuki Endurance Racing Team (World Endurance C'ship)

- 1st FIM Endurance World Championship

1994–96 Race Team: Team Ansett Air Freight Suzuki (Superbikes - Australia)

- 1st Australian Superbike Championship
- 1st Shell Superbike Series
- 1st Australian Superbike Championship

1993 Race Team: Lucky Strike Suzuki (All-Japan 500cc Championship)

- 1st All-Japan 500cc Championship

1992 Race Team: Valvoline ROC-Yamaha (500cc world championship)

- 15th 500cc World Championship

1991 Race Team: Team Hayashi Yamaha (All-Japan 500cc Championship)

- 1st All-Japan 500cc Championship

1989–90 Race Team: Marlboro Yamaha Dealer Team (Superbikes - Australia)

- 2nd Australian Superbike Championship
- 1st Australian Superbike Championship

1988 Race Team: Moriwaki (All-Japan Formula One Championship)

CAREER 1996 1st, Australian Superbike Championship, 1996 1st, Shell Superbike Series (Australia), 1997 1st, World Endurance championship

== Career statistics ==
=== FIM Endurance World Championship ===
Year	Bike	Rider	TC
1997	Suzuki	(United States) Doug Polen (Australia) Peter Goddard	1st

Preceded by Kirk McCarthy	Australian Superbike Champion; 1996	Succeeded by Martin Craggill
