= List of Superbike World Champions =

This is a complete list of FIM World Superbike Champions, from 1988 up to and including 2026.

== Riders' World Championship ==
=== By season ===
Season	Champion	Motorcycle	Tires	Wins	2nd place	3rd place	Team
1988	(United States) Fred Merkel	Honda RC30	M	2	2	1	Rumi Honda
1989	(United States) Fred Merkel	Honda RC30	P	3	2	5	Rumi Honda
1990	(France) Raymond Roche	Ducati 851	M	8	7	2	Squadra Corse Ducati Lucchinelli
1991	(United States) Doug Polen	Ducati 888	D	17	4	0	Fast by Ferracci Ducati
1992	(United States) Doug Polen	Ducati 888	D	9	4	2	Team Police Ducati
1993	(United States) Scott Russell	Kawasaki ZXR-750	D	5	12	1	Team Muzzy Kawasaki
1994	(United Kingdom) Carl Fogarty	Ducati 916	M	10	4	0	Virginio Ferrari Ducati Corse
1995	(United Kingdom) Carl Fogarty	Ducati 916	M	13	6	0	Virginio Ferrari Ducati Corse
1996	(Australia) Troy Corser	Ducati 916	M	7	5	1	Promotor Racing Team
1997	(United States) John Kocinski	Honda RC45	M	9	4	4	Castrol Honda
1998	(United Kingdom) Carl Fogarty	Ducati 916	M	3	6	5	Ducati Performance
1999	(United Kingdom) Carl Fogarty	Ducati 996	M	11	6	2	Ducati Performance
2000	(United States) Colin Edwards	Honda VTR1000 SP/RC51	M	8	2	1	Castrol Honda
2001	(Australia) Troy Bayliss	Ducati 996R	M	6	6	3	Ducati Infostrada
2002	(United States) Colin Edwards	Honda VTR1000 SP-2/RC51	M	11	10	4	Castrol Honda
2003	(United Kingdom) Neil Hodgson	Ducati 999F03	M	13	7	0	Ducati FILA
2004	(United Kingdom) James Toseland	Ducati 999F04	P	3	9	2	Ducati FILA
2005	(Australia) Troy Corser	Suzuki GSX-R1000 K5	P	8	5	5	Alstare Suzuki Corona
2006	(Australia) Troy Bayliss	Ducati 999F06	P	12	3	1	Ducati Xerox
2007	(United Kingdom) James Toseland	Honda CBR1000RR	P	8	5	1	Hannspree Ten Kate Honda
2008	(Australia) Troy Bayliss	Ducati 1098 F08	P	13	6	5	Ducati Xerox Team
2009	(United States) Ben Spies	Yamaha YZF-R1	P	14	2	1	Yamaha World Superbike Team
2010	(Italy) Max Biaggi	Aprilia RSV4 1000	P	10	2	2	Aprilia Alitalia Racing
2011	(Spain) Carlos Checa	Ducati 1098R	P	15	0	6	Althea Racing
2012	(Italy) Max Biaggi	Aprilia RSV4 1000	P	5	2	4	Aprilia Racing Team
2013	(United Kingdom) Tom Sykes	Kawasaki ZX-10R	P	9	4	5	Kawasaki Racing Team
2014	(France) Sylvain Guintoli	Aprilia RSV4 1000	P	5	8	3	Aprilia Racing Team
2015	(United Kingdom) Jonathan Rea	Kawasaki ZX-10R	P	14	7	2	Kawasaki Racing Team
2016	(United Kingdom) Jonathan Rea	Kawasaki ZX-10R	P	9	9	5	Kawasaki Racing Team
2017	(United Kingdom) Jonathan Rea	Kawasaki ZX-10RR	P	16	7	1	Kawasaki Racing Team
2018	(United Kingdom) Jonathan Rea	Kawasaki ZX-10RR	P	17	4	1	Kawasaki Racing Team
2019	(United Kingdom) Jonathan Rea	Kawasaki ZX-10RR	P	17	16	1	Kawasaki Racing Team WorldSBK
2020	(United Kingdom) Jonathan Rea	Kawasaki ZX-10RR	P	11	5	1	Kawasaki Racing Team WorldSBK
2021	(Turkey) Toprak Razgatlıoğlu	Yamaha YZF-R1	P	13	9	7	Pata Yamaha with Brixx WorldSBK
2022	(Spain) Álvaro Bautista	Ducati Panigale V4 R	P	16	12	3	Aruba.it Racing – Ducati
2023	(Spain) Álvaro Bautista	Ducati Panigale V4 R	P	27	3	1	Aruba.it Racing – Ducati
2024	(Turkey) Toprak Razgatlıoğlu	BMW M1000RR	P	18	7	2	Rokit BMW Motorrad
2025	(Turkey) Toprak Razgatlıoğlu	BMW M1000RR	P	21	9	1	Rokit BMW Motorrad
2026	(Italy) Nicolò Bulega	Ducati Panigale V4 R	P	32	4	0	Aruba.it Racing – Ducati

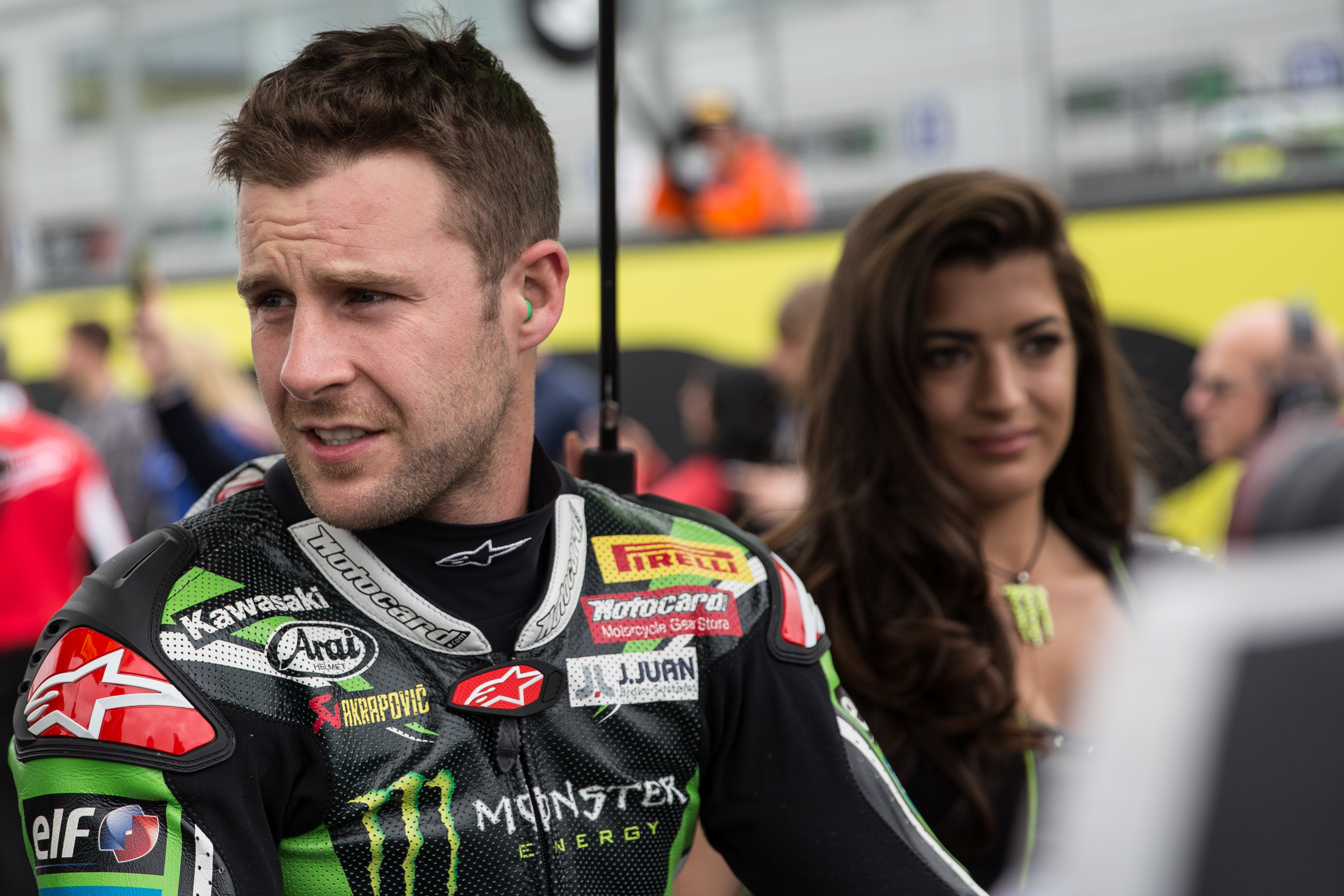
Jonathan Rea has won the Superbike World Championship a record 6 times and also holds the highest number of race wins.

=== By rider ===
Riders in bold were entered in the 2026 World Championship.

Rider	Titles	Season(s)
(United Kingdom) **Jonathan Rea**	6	2015, 2016, 2017, 2018, 2019, 2020
(United Kingdom) Carl Fogarty	4	1994, 1995, 1998, 1999
(Australia) Troy Bayliss	3	2001, 2006, 2008
(Turkey) Toprak Razgatlıoğlu	3	2021, 2024, 2025
(United States) Fred Merkel	2	1988, 1989
(United States) Doug Polen	2	1991, 1992
(Australia) Troy Corser	2	1996, 2005
(United States) Colin Edwards	2	2000, 2002
(United Kingdom) James Toseland	2	2004, 2007
(Italy) Max Biaggi	2	2010, 2012
(Spain) **Álvaro Bautista**	2	2022, 2023
(France) Raymond Roche	1	1990
(United States) Scott Russell	1	1993
(United States) John Kocinski	1	1997
(United Kingdom) Neil Hodgson	1	2003
(United States) Ben Spies	1	2009
(Spain) Carlos Checa	1	2011
(United Kingdom) Tom Sykes	1	2013
(France) Sylvain Guintoli	1	2014
(Italy) **Nicolò Bulega**	1	2026

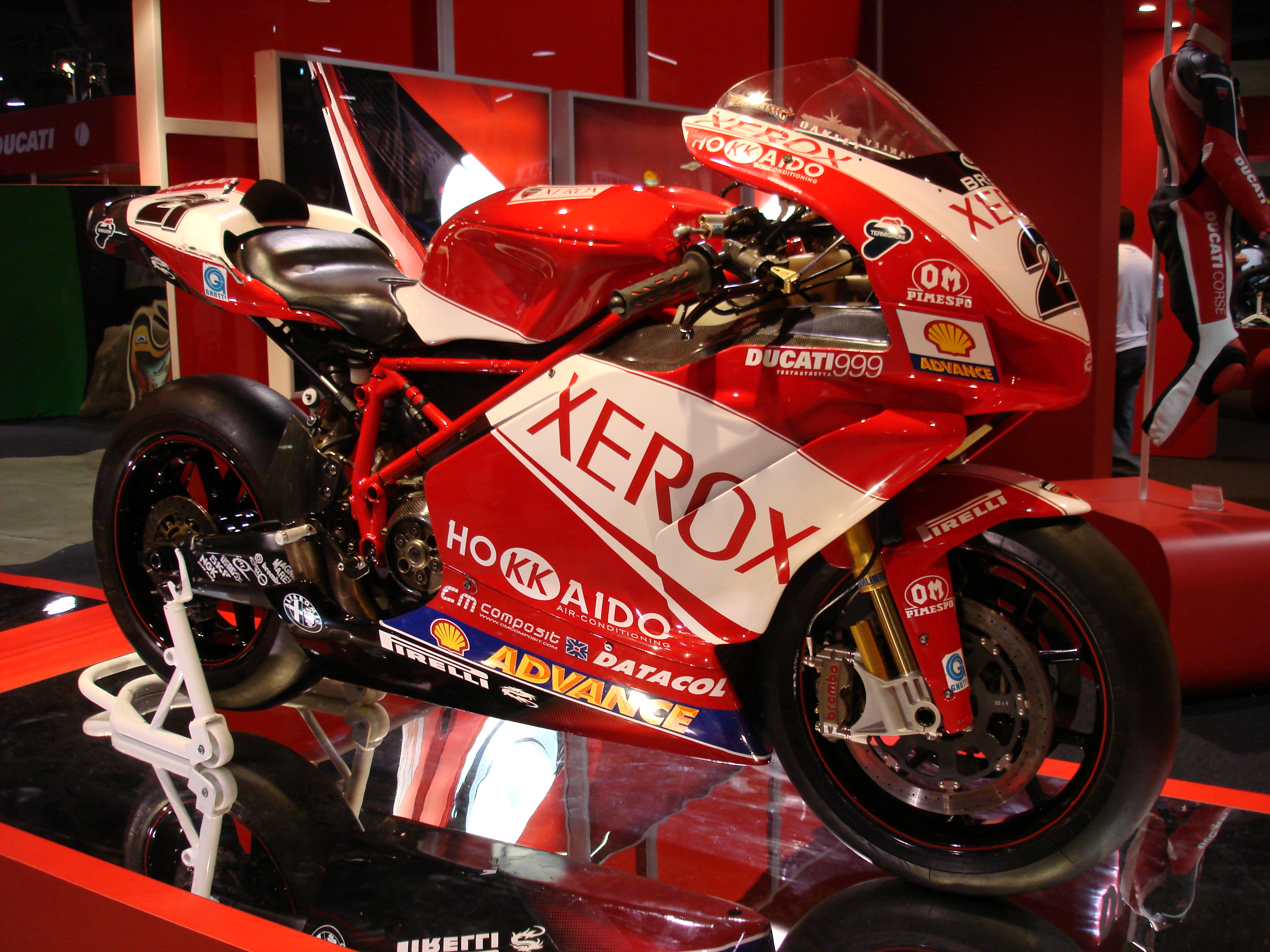
Ducati's v-twin motorcycles have dominated the Superbike World championship with 15 Manufacturer's titles

=== By rider nationality ===
Riders in bold were entered in the 2026 World Championship.

Country	Titles	Champions	Season(s)	By rider (titles)
United Kingdom	14	5	1994–1995, 1998–1999, 2003–2004, 2007, 2013, 2015–2020	**Jonathan Rea** (6)
United Kingdom	14	5	1994–1995, 1998–1999, 2003–2004, 2007, 2013, 2015–2020	Carl Fogarty (4)
United Kingdom	14	5	1994–1995, 1998–1999, 2003–2004, 2007, 2013, 2015–2020	James Toseland (2)
United Kingdom	14	5	1994–1995, 1998–1999, 2003–2004, 2007, 2013, 2015–2020	Neil Hodgson (1)
United Kingdom	14	5	1994–1995, 1998–1999, 2003–2004, 2007, 2013, 2015–2020	Tom Sykes (1)
United States	9	6	1988–1989, 1991–1993, 1997, 2000, 2002, 2009	Fred Merkel (2)
United States	9	6	1988–1989, 1991–1993, 1997, 2000, 2002, 2009	Doug Polen (2)
United States	9	6	1988–1989, 1991–1993, 1997, 2000, 2002, 2009	Colin Edwards (2)
United States	9	6	1988–1989, 1991–1993, 1997, 2000, 2002, 2009	Scott Russell (1)
United States	9	6	1988–1989, 1991–1993, 1997, 2000, 2002, 2009	John Kocinski (1)
United States	9	6	1988–1989, 1991–1993, 1997, 2000, 2002, 2009	Ben Spies (1)
Australia	5	2	1996, 2001, 2005-2006, 2008	Troy Bayliss (3)
Australia	5	2	1996, 2001, 2005-2006, 2008	Troy Corser (2)
Italy	3	2	2010, 2012, 2026	Max Biaggi (2)
Italy	3	2	2010, 2012, 2026	**Nicolò Bulega** (1)
Spain	3	2	2011, 2022–2023	Carlos Checa (1)
Spain	3	2	2011, 2022–2023	**Álvaro Bautista** (2)
Turkey	3	1	2021, 2024–2025	Toprak Razgatlıoğlu (3)
France	2	2	1990, 2014	Raymond Roche (1)
France	2	2	1990, 2014	Sylvain Guintoli (1)

=== By race wins ===
Riders	Total wins
(United Kingdom) Jonathan Rea	119
(Turkey) Toprak Razgatlioglu	78
(Spain) Álvaro Bautista	63
(United Kingdom) Carl Fogarty	59
(Australia) Troy Bayliss	52
(Italy) Nicolò Bulega	52
(United Kingdom) Tom Sykes	34
(Australia) Troy Corser	33
(United States) Colin Edwards	31
(United States) Doug Polen	27
(Spain) Carlos Checa	24
(France) Raymond Roche	23
(Italy) Max Biaggi	21
(United Kingdom) Neil Hodgson	16
(United Kingdom) James Toseland	16
(United States) John Kocinski	14
(United States) Scott Russell	14
(United States) Ben Spies	14
(France) Sylvain Guintoli	9
(United States) Fred Merkel	8

=== By manufacturer ===
This table shows the motorcycles ridden to secure the riders' championship. For the manufacturers' champions, see the section below.

Manufacturer	Titles	Season(s)
(Italy) Ducati	17	1990, 1991, 1992, 1994, 1995, 1996, 1998, 1999, 2001, 2003, 2004, 2006, 2008, 2011, 2022, 2023, 2026
(Japan) Kawasaki	8	1993, 2013, 2015, 2016, 2017, 2018, 2019, 2020
(Japan) Honda	6	1988, 1989, 1997, 2000, 2002, 2007
(Italy) Aprilia	3	2010, 2012, 2014
(Japan) Yamaha	2	2009, 2021
(Germany) BMW	2	2024, 2025
(Japan) Suzuki	1	2005

== Manufacturers' World Championship ==
=== By season ===
Season	Champion	Motorcycle	Wins	2nd place	3rd place
1988	(Japan) Honda	Honda RC30	2	6	8
1989	(Japan) Honda	Honda RC30	8	7	12
1990	(Japan) Honda	Honda RC30	6	8	12
1991	(Italy) Ducati	Ducati 888	23	14	11
1992	(Italy) Ducati	Ducati 888	20	15	11
1993	(Italy) Ducati	Ducati 888	19	6	7
1994	(Italy) Ducati	Ducati 916	12	11	9
1995	(Italy) Ducati	Ducati 916	20	14	8
1996	(Italy) Ducati	Ducati 916	14	10	8
1997	(Japan) Honda	Honda RC45	12	9	10
1998	(Italy) Ducati	Ducati 916	10	14	16
1999	(Italy) Ducati	Ducati 996	16	14	5
2000	(Italy) Ducati	Ducati 996	5	10	7
2001	(Italy) Ducati	Ducati 996R	15	16	7
2002	(Italy) Ducati	Ducati 998 F02	14	12	18
2003	(Italy) Ducati	Ducati 999 F03	24	20	20
2004	(Italy) Ducati	Ducati 999 F04	18	17	20
2005	(Japan) Suzuki	Suzuki GSX-R1000	9	11	6
2006	(Italy) Ducati	Ducati 999 F06	12	3	3
2007	(Japan) Yamaha	Yamaha YZF-R1	6	9	9
2008	(Italy) Ducati	Ducati 1098 F08	13	11	12
2009	(Italy) Ducati	Ducati 1098 F09	11	16	9
2010	(Italy) Aprilia	Aprilia RSV4	10	3	4
2011	(Italy) Ducati	Ducati 1098R	15	4	8
2012	(Italy) Aprilia	Aprilia RSV4	7	5	9
2013	(Italy) Aprilia	Aprilia RSV4	10	9	6
2014	(Italy) Aprilia	Aprilia RSV4	11	10	6
2015	(Japan) Kawasaki	Kawasaki ZX-10R	18	13	7
2016	(Japan) Kawasaki	Kawasaki ZX-10R	14	18	11
2017	(Japan) Kawasaki	Kawasaki ZX-10RR	18	12	10
2018	(Japan) Kawasaki	Kawasaki ZX-10RR	18	9	5
2019	(Japan) Kawasaki	Kawasaki ZX-10RR	19	19	15
2020	(Japan) Kawasaki	Kawasaki ZX-10RR	12	7	2
2021	(Japan) Yamaha	Yamaha YZF-R1	13	10	12
2022	(Italy) Ducati	Panigale V4 R	16	14	8
2023	(Italy) Ducati	Panigale V4 R	28	9	7
2024	(Italy) Ducati	Panigale V4 R	15	19	19
2025	(Italy) Ducati	Panigale V4 R	14	21	29
2026	(Italy) Ducati	Panigale V4 R	36	34	31

=== By manufacturer ===
Manufacturers in bold were entered in the 2026 World Championship.

Manufacturer	Championships	Year
(Italy) **Ducati**	22	1991, 1992, 1993, 1994, 1995, 1996, 1998, 1999, 2000, 2001, 2002, 2003, 2004, 2006, 2008, 2009, 2011, 2022, 2023, 2024, 2025, 2026
(Japan) **Kawasaki**	6	2015, 2016, 2017, 2018, 2019, 2020
(Japan) **Honda**	4	1988, 1989, 1990, 1997
(Italy) Aprilia	4	2010, 2012, 2013, 2014
(Japan) **Yamaha**	2	2007, 2021
(Japan) Suzuki	1	2005

=== By manufacturer nationality ===
Manufacturers in bold were entered in the 2026 World Championship.

Country	Titles	Champions	Season(s)	By manufacturer (titles)
Italy	26	2	1991–1996, 1998–2004, 2006, 2008–2014, 2022–2026	**Ducati** (22)
Italy	26	2	1991–1996, 1998–2004, 2006, 2008–2014, 2022–2026	Aprilia (4)
Japan	13	4	1988–1990, 1997, 2005, 2007, 2015–2021	**Kawasaki** (6)
Japan	13	4	1988–1990, 1997, 2005, 2007, 2015–2021	**Honda** (4)
Japan	13	4	1988–1990, 1997, 2005, 2007, 2015–2021	**Yamaha** (2)
Japan	13	4	1988–1990, 1997, 2005, 2007, 2015–2021	Suzuki (1)

As of 18 October 2026

== SuperBike Evo Trophy ==
Year	Rider	Points	Bike	Team
2014	(Spain) David Salom	103	(Japan) Kawasaki ZX-10R	(Spain) Kawasaki Racing

== Independents Cup ==
Year	Ruder	Points	Bike	Team
2018	(Spain) Javier Forés	230	(Italy) Ducati Panigale R	(Italy) Barni Spark Racing Team
2019	(Turkey) Toprak Razgatlıoğlu	315	(Japan) Kawasaki ZX-10R	(Italy) Turkish Puccetti Racing
2020	(Italy) Michael Ruben Rinaldi	186	(Italy) Ducati Panigale V4 R	(Italy) Team GoEleven
2021	(United States) Garrett Gerloff	228	(Japan) Yamaha YZF-R1	(Italy) GRT Yamaha WorldSBK Team
2022	(Italy) Axel Bassani	244	(Italy) Ducati Panigale V4 R	(Italy) Motocorsa Racing
2023	(Italy) Axel Bassani	249	(Italy) Ducati Panigale V4 R	(Italy) Motocorsa Racing
2024	(Italy) Danilo Petrucci	307	(Italy) Ducati Panigale V4 R	(Italy) Barni Spark Racing Team
2025	(Italy) Danilo Petrucci	284	(Italy) Ducati Panigale V4 R	(Italy) Barni Spark Racing Team
2026	(Italy) Yari Montella	318	(Italy) Ducati Panigale V4 R	(Italy) Barni Spark Racing Team
