= Honda RC51 =

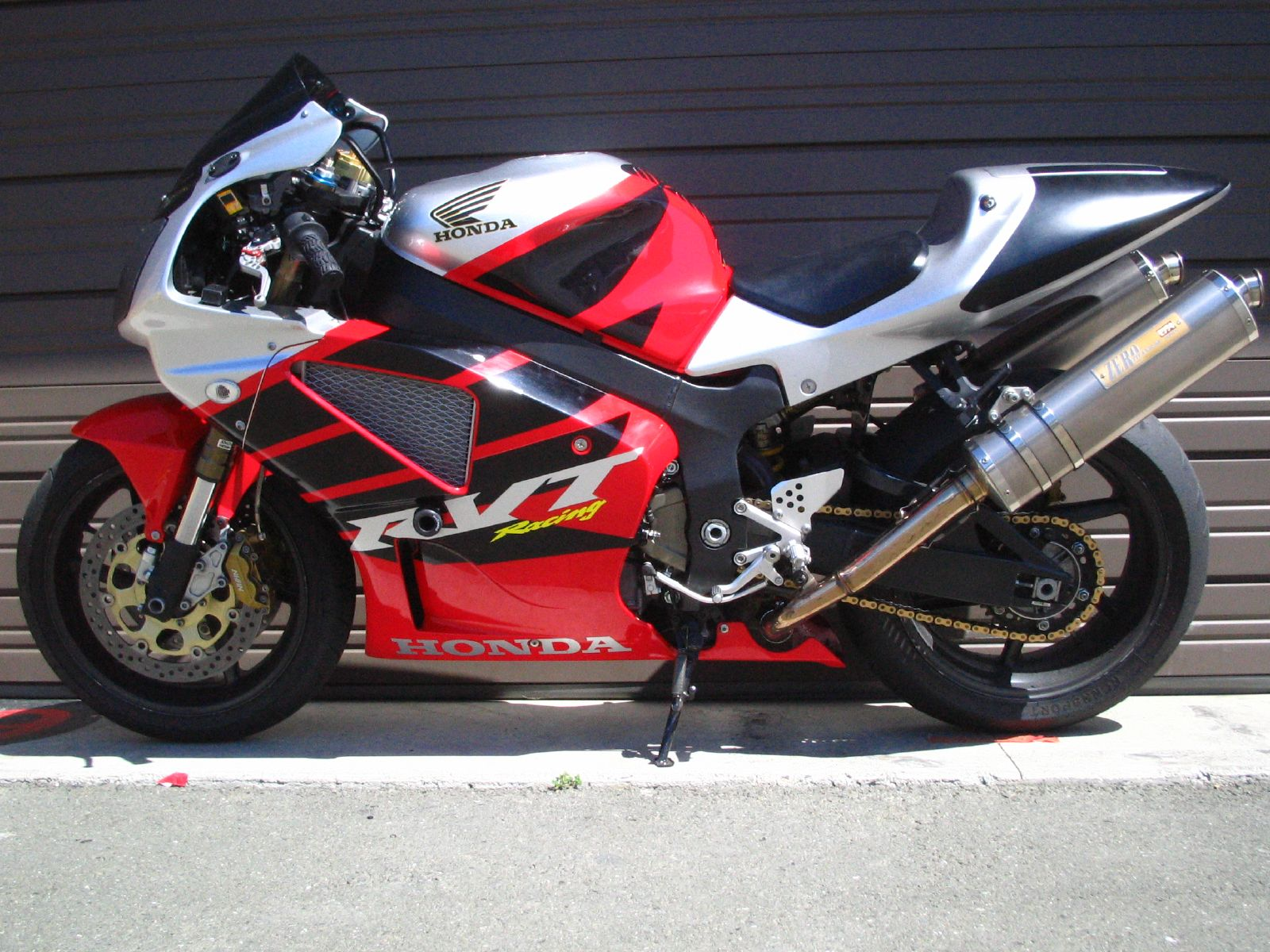
- Manufacturer: Honda
- Also called: RVT1000R; VTR1000SP1; VTR1000SP2
- Production: 2000 - 2006
- Predecessor: RVF750 RC45
- Successor: CBR1000RR
- Class: Super bike
- Engine: 999 cc liquid-cooled 90° L-twin
- Bore / stroke: 100 mm × 63.6 mm (3.94 in × 2.50 in)
- Compression ratio: 10.8:1
- Top speed: 174 mph (280 km/h)
- Power: 133 hp (99 kW) (claimed); 118 hp (88 kW) (rear wheel)
- Torque: 71.4 lb⋅ft (96.8 N⋅m) (rear wheel)
- Transmission: Close-ratio six-speed
- Rake, trail: 24.5 degrees / 100.5 mm (3.96 in) SP1; 23.5 degrees / 94.6 mm (3.72 in) SP2
- Wheelbase: 1,409.7 mm (55.50 in) SP1; 1,425.7 mm (56.13 in)SP2
- Seat height: 825.5 mm (32.50 in)
- Weight: 440 lb (200 kg) (dry); 489 lb (222 kg) (wet)
- Fuel capacity: 4.8 gallons, including 1.2 gallon reserve
- Fuel consumption: 8.4 L/100 km; 34 mpg_{‑imp} (28 mpg_{‑US})
- Related: VTR1000F "Super Hawk"

The Honda RC51, also known as the RVT1000R (in the United States) or VTR1000SP1 (Europe and Australia), is a 90° L-twin motorcycle produced by Honda from 2000 to 2006.

== Mechanicals and chassis ==
The engine is a 999cc dual overhead cam L-twin unit with two fuel injectors and four valves per cylinder. Power is delivered to the rear wheel by a close-ratio, six-speed transmission. The chassis is constructed from aluminum alloy, being a twin-spar design.

The RC51 is a racing superbike that benefits from gearbox sprocket changes for street use. Factory RC51s were highly geared for top-speed performance.

== History ==
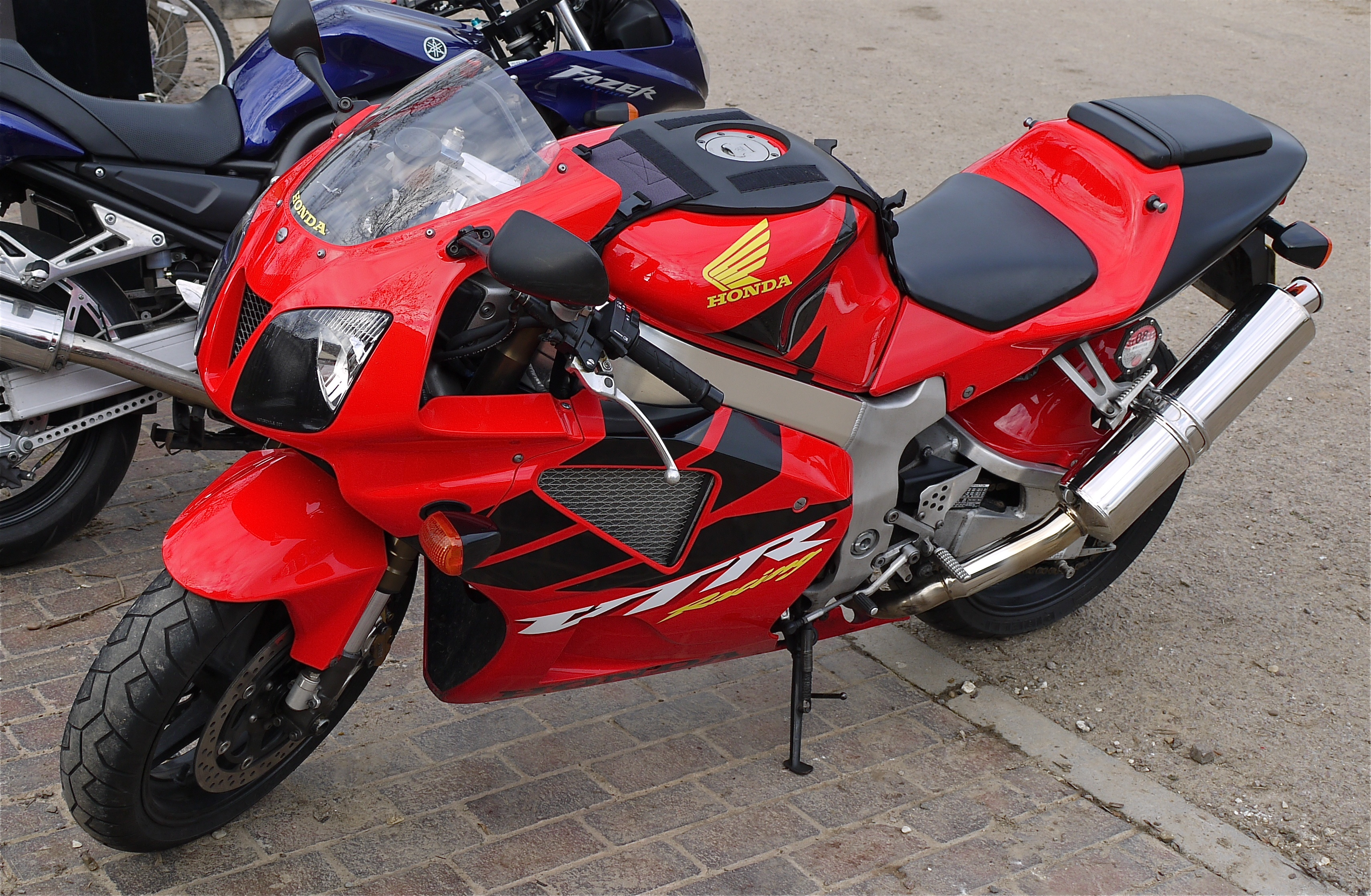
Honda VTR1000

The RC51 was designed as the motorcycle to be used by Honda's racing teams in the Superbike World Championship. The 2000–2001 models are designated SP1, while the 2002–2006 models are designated SP2 (the latter having updated fuel injection and suspension systems).

=== 1988–2002 ===
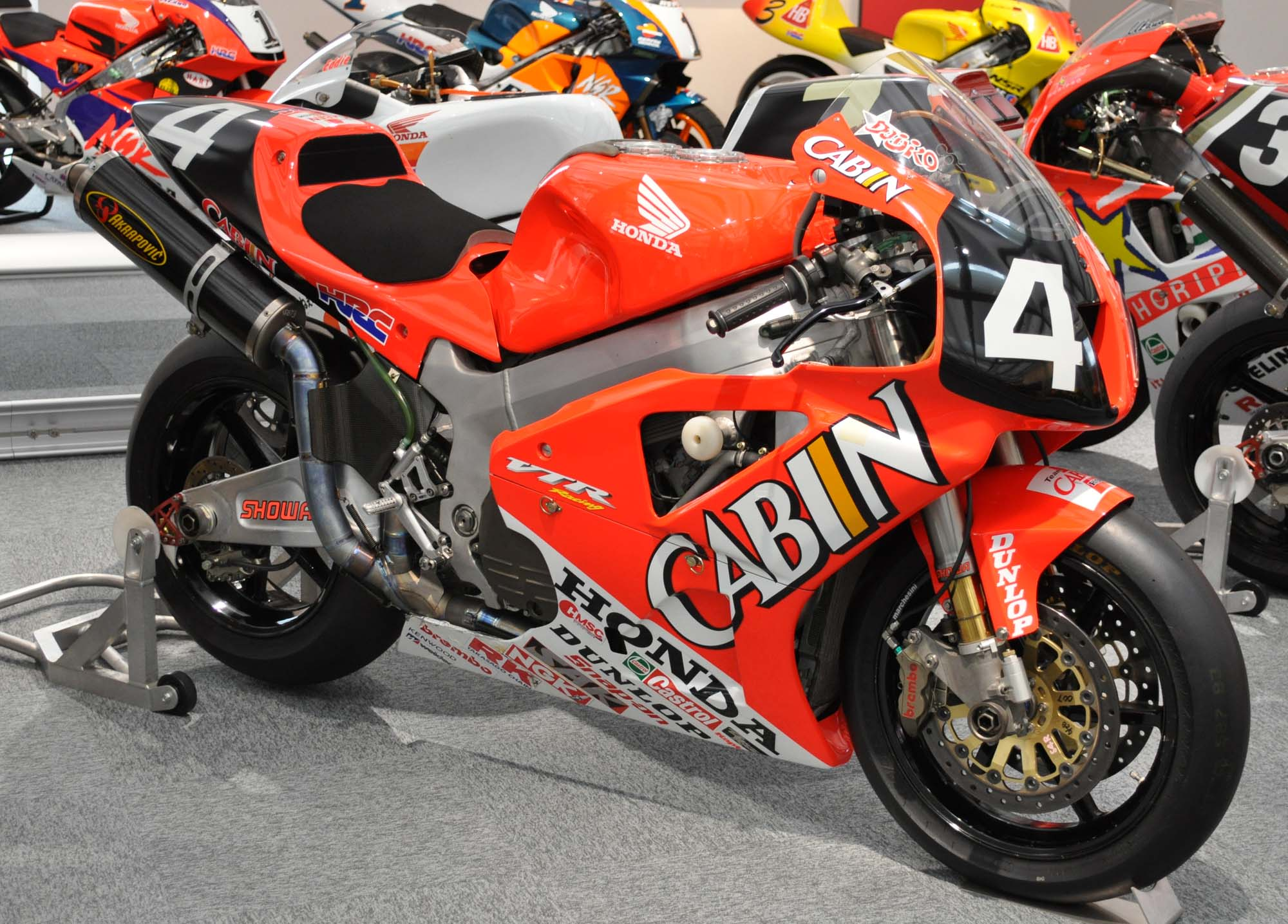
2000 Honda RC51

In 1988, new rules in superbike racing allowed V-twin engines up to 999 cc to compete. Prior to the rules change, 750 cc four-cylinder motorcycles were the dominant force in production-based competition. During the first two years of the World Superbike championship, Honda won the series with their RC30, powered by a 750 cc V-4. In 1990, however, Raymond Roche secured Ducati's first world title aboard the Ducati 851. Throughout the next 11 years, Ducati would go on to win 8 World Superbike Championships with their V-twins (Honda won two and Kawasaki one).

Honda could not win consistently, particularly because of rival V-twins' displacement advantage over Honda's V-4. In 2000 Honda released the RC51, powered by a 999 cc liquid-cooled V-twin engine. That year, it won the World Superbike Championship with Colin Edwards riding for the Castrol team. In 2001, Ducati regained the title but the RC51 was still a contender boasting superior reliability with comparable speed and power. The RC51 won again in its final year of factory-supported racing in World Superbike in 2002 after Edwards' tremendous title fight with Troy Bayliss. That same year also captured the AMA Superbike title with Nicky Hayden. Honda had taken the lessons learned in the SP1's first season, producing the SP2 in 2002. A stronger, more rigid frame and swingarm were identical to the WSB race bike parts and engine modifications boosted peak power by 3 kW (4 bhp) and cut weight by 5 kg (11 lb). Factory specifications for road going SP2s (sourced from Honda) were 133 bhp with a top speed of 174 mph (280 km/h).

Wim Motors won the 2001 Endurance FIM World Championship.

=== 2003–2005 ===
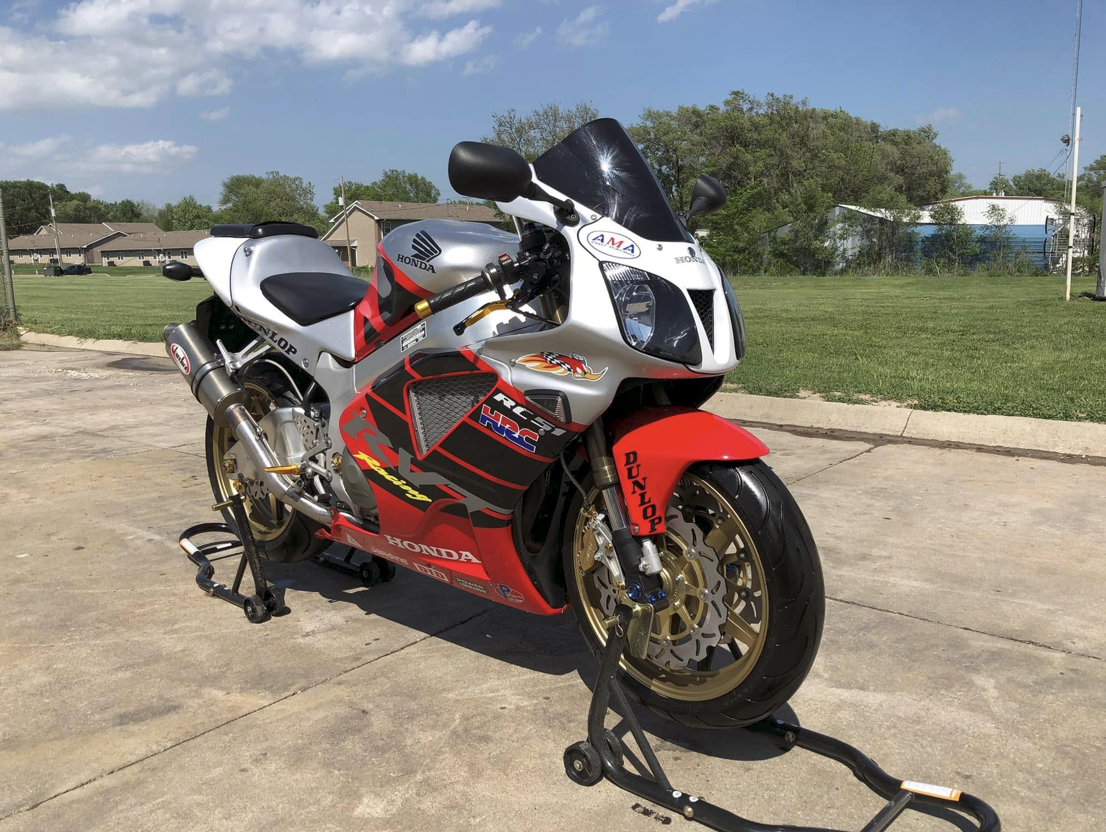
2004 Nicky Hayden Edition Honda RC51

Honda stopped official support for World Superbike racing in 2003 (though some teams have had factory support) and as superbike rules changed to allow 1000 cc 4-cylinder bikes the RC51 was replaced by the CBR1000RR Fireblade as the Honda superbike racer. In 2004, Honda released the Nicky Hayden special edition, which differed from previous models in that it had a brushed aluminum frame and swingarm, a sticker kit, and white number plates on the front upper fairing and tail fairing. In 2005, Honda Released the black "RVT" Color scheme before the RC51 product line was discontinued.

=== European Market ===
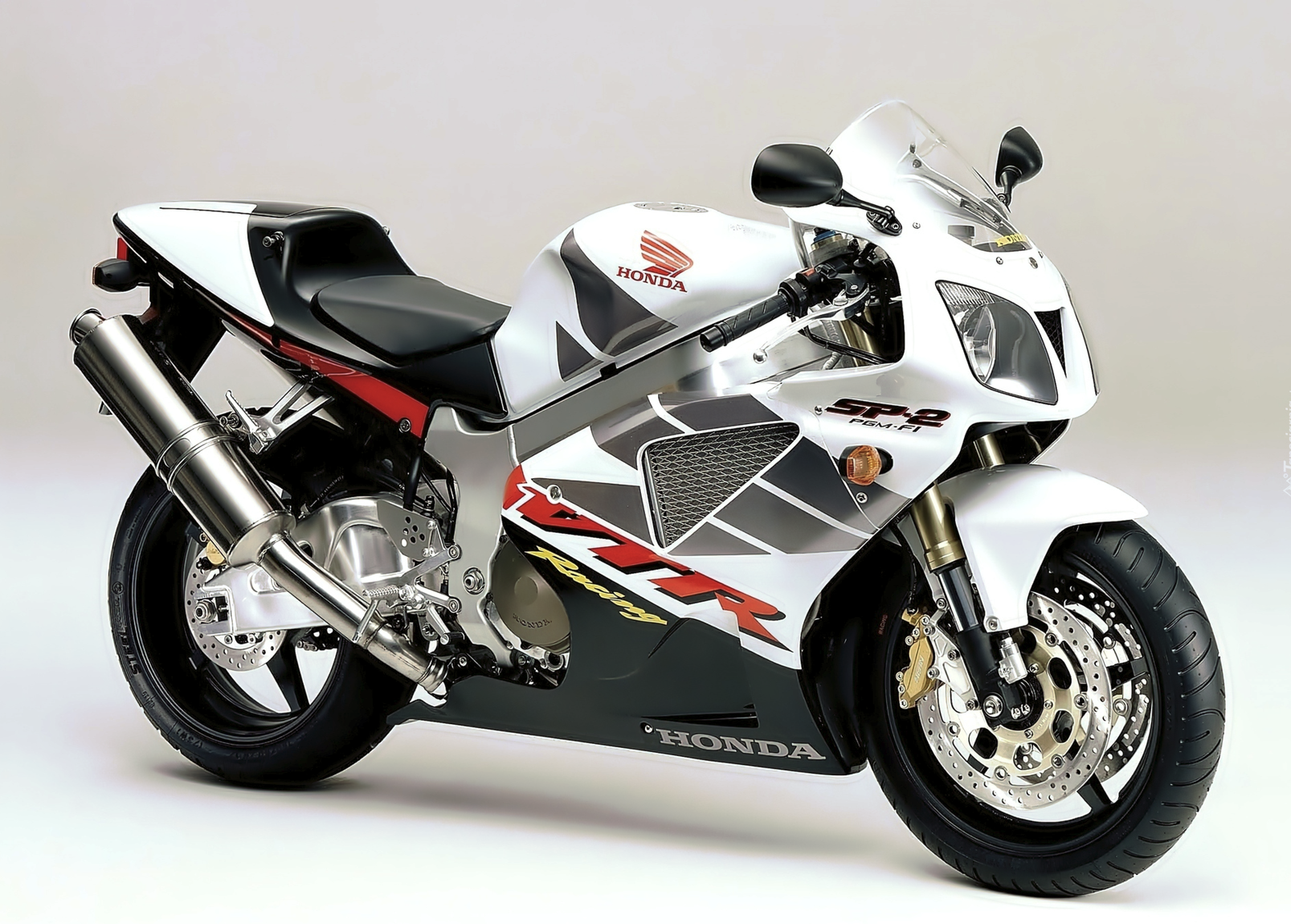
European VTR1000

Honda Offered the RC51 as the "VTR1000-SP1" (2000-2001) and "VTR1000-SP2" (2002-2006). The color schemes were different than the USA releases with more solid Red, Black and white models for various years though out the production run. There were also a few differences from the USA version with emissions standards similar to California sold Motorcycles.
