= 2002 Superbike World Championship =

2002 Superbike World Championship
Previous:	2001	Next:	2003
Support series: Supersport World Championship; Superstock European Championship

The 2002 Superbike World Championship was the fifteenth FIM Superbike World Championship season. The season started on 2 March at Valencia and finished on 29 September at Imola after 13 rounds.

Colin Edwards won his second championship in what has been hailed as one of the most impressive comebacks in the history of motorcycle racing. The season started with Troy Bayliss winning the first six races and by the end of race 1 at Mazda Raceway Laguna Seca he had 14 wins and was leading the championship by 58 points. Race 2 at Laguna Seca was the start of Colin Edwards' comeback, he went on to win all nine remaining races and combined with a race 2 crash for Bayliss at Assen Edwards won the championship at the final race of the season at Imola. The final race of the season saw both riders fighting wheel to wheel for the entire race. The race is known to fans as the "Showdown at Imola".

The manufacturers' championship was won by Ducati.

== Race calendar and results ==
2002 Superbike World Championship Calendar
Round		Circuit	Date	Superpole	Fastest lap	Winning rider	Winning team	Report
1	R1	(Spain) Valencia	10 March	(Australia) Troy Bayliss	(Australia) Troy Bayliss	(Australia) Troy Bayliss	Ducati Infostrada	Report
1	R2	(Spain) Valencia	10 March	(Australia) Troy Bayliss	(United States) Ben Bostrom	(Australia) Troy Bayliss	Ducati Infostrada	Report
2	R1	(Australia) Phillip Island	24 March	(United States) Colin Edwards	(United States) Colin Edwards	(Australia) Troy Bayliss	Ducati Infostrada	Report
2	R2	(Australia) Phillip Island	24 March	(United States) Colin Edwards	(United States) Colin Edwards	(Australia) Troy Bayliss	Ducati Infostrada	Report
3	R1	(South Africa) Kyalami	7 April	(United States) Colin Edwards	(Japan) Noriyuki Haga	(Australia) Troy Bayliss	Ducati Infostrada	Report
3	R2	(South Africa) Kyalami	7 April	(United States) Colin Edwards	(Japan) Noriyuki Haga	(Australia) Troy Bayliss	Ducati Infostrada	Report
4	R1	(Japan) Sportsland SUGO	21 April	(Japan) Noriyuki Haga	(Japan) Noriyuki Haga	(United States) Colin Edwards	Castrol Honda	Report
4	R2	(Japan) Sportsland SUGO	21 April	(Japan) Noriyuki Haga	(Japan) Makoto Tamada	(Japan) Makoto Tamada	Cabin Honda	Report
5	R1	(Italy) Monza	12 May	(United Kingdom) Neil Hodgson	(Australia) Troy Bayliss	(Australia) Troy Bayliss	Ducati Infostrada	Report
5	R2	(Italy) Monza	12 May	(United Kingdom) Neil Hodgson	(Australia) Troy Bayliss	(Australia) Troy Bayliss	Ducati Infostrada	Report
6	R1	(United Kingdom) Silverstone	26 May	(Australia) Troy Bayliss	(Australia) Troy Bayliss	(United States) Colin Edwards	Castrol Honda	Report
6	R2	(United Kingdom) Silverstone	26 May	(Australia) Troy Bayliss	(Australia) Troy Bayliss	(Australia) Troy Bayliss	Ducati Infostrada	Report
7	R1	(Germany) Lausitzring	9 June	(Australia) Troy Bayliss	(Australia) Troy Bayliss	(Australia) Troy Bayliss	Ducati Infostrada	Report
7	R2	(Germany) Lausitzring	9 June	(Australia) Troy Bayliss	(Spain) Rubén Xaus	(Australia) Troy Bayliss	Ducati Infostrada	Report
8	R1	(San Marino) Misano Adriatico	23 June	(Australia) Troy Bayliss	(Australia) Troy Bayliss	(Australia) Troy Bayliss	Ducati Infostrada	Report
8	R2	(San Marino) Misano Adriatico	23 June	(Australia) Troy Bayliss	(United States) Colin Edwards	(Australia) Troy Bayliss	Ducati Infostrada	Report
9	R1	(United States) Laguna Seca	14 July	(United States) Colin Edwards	(Japan) Noriyuki Haga	(Australia) Troy Bayliss	Ducati Infostrada	Report
9	R2	(United States) Laguna Seca	14 July	(United States) Colin Edwards	(United Kingdom) Neil Hodgson	(United States) Colin Edwards	Castrol Honda	Report
10	R1	(Europe) Brands Hatch	28 July	(United Kingdom) Neil Hodgson	(Australia) Troy Bayliss	(United States) Colin Edwards	Castrol Honda	Report
10	R2	(Europe) Brands Hatch	28 July	(United Kingdom) Neil Hodgson	(United States) Colin Edwards	(United States) Colin Edwards	Castrol Honda	Report
11	R1	(Germany) Oschersleben	1 September	(United Kingdom) Neil Hodgson	(United States) Colin Edwards	(United States) Colin Edwards	Castrol Honda	Report
11	R2	(Germany) Oschersleben	1 September	(United Kingdom) Neil Hodgson	(United States) Colin Edwards	(United States) Colin Edwards	Castrol Honda	Report
12	R1	(Netherlands) Assen	8 September	(United States) Colin Edwards	(United States) Colin Edwards	(United States) Colin Edwards	Castrol Honda	Report
12	R2	(Netherlands) Assen	8 September	(United States) Colin Edwards	(Spain) Rubén Xaus	(United States) Colin Edwards	Castrol Honda	Report
13	R1	(Italy) Imola	29 September	(United States) Colin Edwards	(United States) Colin Edwards	(United States) Colin Edwards	Castrol Honda	Report
13	R2	(Italy) Imola	29 September	(United States) Colin Edwards	(Australia) Troy Bayliss	(United States) Colin Edwards	Castrol Honda	Report

== Championship standings ==
=== Riders' standings ===
2002 final riders' standings
Pos.	Rider	Bike	ESP (Spain)		AUS (Australia)		RSA (South Africa)		JPN (Japan)		ITA (Italy)		GBR (United Kingdom)		GER (Germany)		SMR (San Marino)		USA (United States)		EUR (Europe)		GER (Germany)		NED (Netherlands)		ITA (Italy)		Pts
Pos.	Rider	Bike	R1	R2	R1	R2	R1	R2	R1	R2	R1	R2	R1	R2	R1	R2	R1	R2	R1	R2	R1	R2	R1	R2	R1	R2	R1	R2	Pts
1	(United States) Colin Edwards	Honda	4	3	**2**	**2**	**2**	**3**	1	2	3	2	1	2	2	2	2	2	**3**	**1**	1	1	1	1	**1**	**1**	**1**	**1**	552
2	(Australia) Troy Bayliss	Ducati	**1**	**1**	1	1	1	1	5	4	1	1	**5**	**1**	**1**	**1**	**1**	**1**	1	2	3	2	2	2	2	Ret	2	2	541
3	(United Kingdom) Neil Hodgson	Ducati	6	5	5	4	5	4	4	3	**2**	**4**	3	6	Ret	8	3	4	5	3	**2**	**3**	**3**	**3**	Ret	4	4	5	326
4	(Japan) Noriyuki Haga	Aprilia	2	2	Ret	6	Ret	6	**3**	**5**	Ret	3	2	10	4	5	4	3	Ret	Ret	4	5	7	4	3	6	5	4	278
5	(United States) Ben Bostrom	Ducati	3	4	4	5	4	5	7	7	Ret	9	7	8	5	4	5	5	8	5	7	4	4	6	8	5	10	9	261
6	(Spain) Rubén Xaus	Ducati	5	Ret	3	3	3	2	Ret	9	6	Ret	8	3	3	3	Ret	Ret	2	19	5	6	Ret	5	4	Ret	3	3	249
7	(United Kingdom) James Toseland	Ducati	12	10	8	7	6	8	9	11	5	Ret	10	9	7	7	8	Ret	9	6	9	Ret	6	8	6	3	6	6	195
8	(Italy) Pierfrancesco Chili	Ducati	9	Ret	Ret	Ret	DNS	DNS			4	Ret	4	11	6	6	6	7	12	7	8	7	5	7	5	2	7	Ret	167
9	(United Kingdom) Chris Walker	Kawasaki	10	7	9	9	8	9	11	13	Ret	10	14	4	Ret	9	7	8	11	10	6	8	9	15	Ret	7	11	12	152
10	(Spain) Gregorio Lavilla	Suzuki	8	Ret	7	8	Ret	11	12	12	7	5	Ret	14	8	Ret	10	6	DNS	DNS	15	12	8	9	7	Ret	8	7	130
11	(Australia) Broc Parkes	Ducati	15	DNS	Ret	13	11	14	Ret	Ret	Ret	8	Ret	12	11	Ret	Ret	14	15	12	Ret	18	10	10	9	8	9	8	77
12	(Spain) Juan Borja	Ducati	11	8	12	10	9	10	14	15	11	Ret	Ret	7	Ret	Ret	Ret	Ret			11	11	DNS	DNS	10	Ret	Ret	11	74
13	(Italy) Lucio Pedercini	Ducati	14	11	10	Ret	Ret	12	16	18	Ret	6	Ret	Ret	10	10	9	9	17	16	Ret	Ret	13	12	Ret	10	14	13	71
14	(Japan) Hitoyasu Izutsu	Kawasaki	7	6	6	Ret	7	7	DNS	DNS							DNS	DNS			13	17	11	Ret	DNS	DNS	15	10	62
15	(Italy) Marco Borciani	Ducati	16	12	11	Ret	10	13	Ret	17	Ret	Ret	Ret	Ret	12	12	11	10	Ret	18	16	15	Ret	11	11	9	16	Ret	55
16	(Australia) Steve Martin	Ducati	17	9	13	Ret	Ret	Ret	17	20	10	11	Ret	19	9	11	13	12	14	11	19	16	DNS	DNS	Ret	DNS	13	14	52
17	(United States) Eric Bostrom	Kawasaki							13	14	9	7	11	16					6	4			DNS	DNS					49
18	(Japan) Makoto Tamada	Honda							2	1																			45
19	(Italy) Mauro Sanchini	Kawasaki	19	15	15	12	13	16	20	22	12	13	15	Ret	14	14	12	11	19	15	Ret	19	16	14	13	12	17	15	41
20	(Italy) Alessandro Antonello	Ducati	13	Ret	14	11	Ret	Ret	Ret	DNS	8	Ret	Ret	13	13	Ret	Ret	Ret	18	Ret	12	13	Ret	Ret	Ret	13	12	Ret	38
21	(United Kingdom) Shane Byrne	Ducati											9	5							10	10							30
22	(Australia) Peter Goddard	Benelli	DNS	DNS							14	17	13	15	Ret	15	15	Ret	16	14	18	Ret	12	Ret	12	11	Ret	DNS	23
23	(Japan) Akira Yanagawa	Kawasaki							6	6																			20
24	(United States) Aaron Yates	Suzuki																	7	8									17
25	(Italy) Serafino Foti	Ducati	Ret	14	Ret	Ret	12	15			Ret	12	Ret	Ret	16	16	14	Ret	Ret	17			14	Ret	14	16	Ret	Ret	17
26	(United States) Nicky Hayden	Honda																	4	13									16
27	(Japan) Wataru Yoshikawa	Yamaha							8	8																			16
28	(United Kingdom) Mark Heckles	Honda	21	Ret	16	14	DNS	DNS	21	Ret	15	18	6	Ret	17	17	19	Ret	20	20	17	20	15	16	17	15	20	Ret	15
29	(Japan) Takeshi Tsujimura	Yamaha							10	10																			12
30	(United Kingdom) Michael Rutter	Ducati											12	Ret							Ret	9							11
31	(Italy) Ivan Clementi	Kawasaki	18	13	Ret	15	DNQ	DNQ	18	19	17	14	Ret	18	18	Ret	17	Ret	Ret	21	Ret	21	Ret	13	Ret	14	18	16	11
32	(United States) Doug Chandler	Ducati																	13	9									10
33	(Australia) Mat Mladin	Suzuki																	10	Ret									6
34	(Germany) Alex Hofmann	Kawasaki													15	13													4
35	(Italy) Alessandro Valia	Ducati									13	15					18	Ret									19	17	4
36	(Italy) Michele Malatesta	Ducati															Ret	13									Ret	Ret	3
37	(France) Bertrand Stey	Honda	Ret	17	Ret	16	14	17			Ret	Ret	DNQ	DNQ			20	15	22	23	Ret	Ret							3
38	(Australia) Glen Richards	Kawasaki											Ret	Ret							20	14							2
39	(United Kingdom) Dean Ellison	Ducati											16	Ret							14	Ret							2
40	(Spain) Jerónimo Vidal	Honda																							15	Ret	Ret	18	1
41	(Japan) Yuichi Takeda	Honda							15	16																			1
Pos.	Rider	Bike	ESP (Spain)		AUS (Australia)		RSA (South Africa)		JPN (Japan)		ITA (Italy)		GBR (United Kingdom)		GER (Germany)		SMR (San Marino)		USA (United States)		EUR (Europe)		GER (Germany)		NED (Netherlands)		ITA (Italy)		Pts

Colour	Result
Gold	Winner
Silver	Second place
Bronze	Third place
Green	Points classification
Blue	Non-points classification
Blue	Non-classified finish (NC)
Purple	Retired, not classified (Ret)
Red	Did not qualify (DNQ)
Red	Did not pre-qualify (DNPQ)
Black	Disqualified (DSQ)
White	Did not start (DNS)
White	Withdrew (WD)
White	Race cancelled (C)
Blank	Did not practice (DNP)
Blank	Did not arrive (DNA)
Blank	Excluded (EX)

**Bold** – Pole position
Italics – Fastest lap

=== Manufacturers' standings ===
Pos.	Manufacturer	ESP (Spain)		AUS (Australia)		RSA (South Africa)		JPN (Japan)		ITA (Italy)		GBR (United Kingdom)		GER (Germany)		SMR (San Marino)		USA (United States)		EUR (Europe)		GER (Germany)		NED (Netherlands)		ITA (Italy)		Pts
Pos.	Manufacturer	R1	R2	R1	R2	R1	R2	R1	R2	R1	R2	R1	R2	R1	R2	R1	R2	R1	R2	R1	R2	R1	R2	R1	R2	R1	R2	Pts
1	(Italy) Ducati	1	1	1	1	1	1	4	3	1	1	3	1	1	1	1	1	1	2	2	2	2	2	2	2	2	2	575
2	(Japan) Honda	4	3	2	2	2	3	1	1	3	2	1	2	2	2	2	2	3	1	1	1	1	1	1	1	1	1	557
3	(Italy) Aprilia	2	2	Ret	6	Ret	6	3	5	Ret	3	2	10	4	5	4	3	Ret	Ret	4	5	7	4	3	6	5	4	278
4	(Japan) Kawasaki	7	6	6	9	7	7	6	6	9	7	11	4	14	9	7	8	6	4	6	8	9	13	13	7	11	10	208
5	(Japan) Suzuki	8	Ret	7	8	Ret	11	12	12	7	5	Ret	14	8	Ret	10	6	7	8	15	12	8	9	7	Ret	8	7	147
6	(Italy) Benelli	DNS	DNS							14	17	13	15	Ret	15	15	Ret	16	14	18	Ret	12	Ret	12	11	Ret	DNS	23
7	(Japan) Yamaha							8	8					DNQ	DNQ			DNS	DNS			DNQ	DNQ			22	19	16
Pos.	Manufacturer	ESP (Spain)		AUS (Australia)		RSA (South Africa)		JPN (Japan)		ITA (Italy)		GBR (United Kingdom)		GER (Germany)		SMR (San Marino)		USA (United States)		EUR (Europe)		GER (Germany)		NED (Netherlands)		ITA (Italy)		Pts

== Entry list ==
No	Rider	Team	Motorcycle	Tyre
1	(Australia) Troy Bayliss	Ducati Infostrada	Ducati 998 F02	
2	(United States) Colin Edwards	Castrol Honda	Honda VTR1000SP2	
5	(United Kingdom) Mark Heckles	Castrol Honda Rumi	Honda VTR1000SP2	
6	(Australia) Peter Goddard	Benelli Sport	Benelli Tornado Tre 900 LE	
7	(Italy) Pierfrancesco Chili	Ducati NCR Axo	Ducati 998 RS	
9	(United Kingdom) Chris Walker	Kawasaki Racing	Kawasaki ZX-7RR	
10	(Spain) Gregorio Lavilla	Alstare Suzuki Corona	Suzuki GSX-R750 Y	
11	(Spain) Ruben Xaus	Ducati Infostrada	Ducati 998 F02	
12	(Australia) Broc Parkes	Ducati NCR Parmalat	Ducati 998 RS	
14	(Japan) Hitoyasu Izutsu	Kawasaki Racing	Kawasaki ZX-7RR	
17	(Australia) Alistair Maxwell	Alistair Maxwell	Kawasaki ZX-7RR	
19	(Italy) Lucio Pedercini	Pedercini	Ducati 998 RS	
20	(Italy) Marco Borciani	Pedercini	Ducati 998 RS	
23	(Czech Republic) Jiri Mrkyvka	JM Racing	Ducati 996 RS	
28	(Italy) Serafino Foti	Pedercini	Ducati 996 RS	
30	(Italy) Alessandro Antonello	DFX Racing Ducati Pirelli	Ducati 998 RS	
32	(United States) Eric Bostrom	Kawasaki Racing	Kawasaki ZX-7RR	
33	(Spain) Juan Borja	Spaziotel Racing	Ducati 998 RS	
36	(Italy) Ivan Clementi	Kawasaki Bertocchi	Kawasaki ZX-7RR	
40	(Italy) Giuliano Sartoni	Vemar Giesse	Ducati 996 RS	
41	(Japan) Noriyuki Haga	PlayStation 2-FGF Aprilia	Aprilia RSV 1000	
42	(Japan) Makoto Tamada	Cabin Honda	Honda VTR1000SP2	
43	(Japan) Wataru Yoshikawa	YSP Racing & PRESTO	Yamaha YZF-R7	
45	(Japan) Takeshi Tsujimura	YSP Racing & PRESTO	Yamaha YZF-R7	
46	(Italy) Mauro Sanchini	Kawasaki Bertocchi	Kawasaki ZX-7RR	
47	(Japan) Kenichiro Nakamura	Blue Helmet MSC	Honda VTR1000SP2	
48	(Japan) Yuichi Takeda	Sakurai Honda	Honda VTR1000SP2	
49	(Japan) Akira Yanagawa	Kawasaki Racing	Kawasaki ZX-7RR	
50	(Italy) Alessandro Valia	Ass. Sportiva Bassani	Ducati 996 RS	
52	(United Kingdom) James Toseland	HM Plant Ducati	Ducati 998 F 01	
53	(United Kingdom) Steve Hislop	Monster Mob Ducati	Ducati 998 RS	
54	(United Kingdom) Michael Rutter	Renegade Ducati	Ducati 998 RS	
55	(United Kingdom) Shane Byrne	Renegade Ducati	Ducati 998 RS	
56	(United Kingdom) Dean Ellison	D & B Racing	Ducati 996 RS	
57	(Australia) Glen Richards	Hawk Kawasaki	Kawasaki ZX-7RR	
60	(Spain) Jeronimo Vidal	White Endurance	Honda VTR1000SP1	
61	(Slovenia) Marjan Malec	Magnat Auto	Ducati 996 RS	
66	(Germany) Alex Hofmann	Kawasaki Racing	Kawasaki ZX-7RR	
68	(France) Bertrand Stey	White Endurance	Honda VTR1000SP1	
69	(United States) Nicky Hayden	American Honda	Honda RC51	
69	(France) Thierry Mulot	Pacific	Ducati 996 SPS	
70	(Switzerland) Yann Gyger	White Endurance	Honda VTR1000SP1	
72	(United States) Mark Miller	White Endurance	Honda VTR1000SP1	
75	(Italy) Luca Pini	Pedercini	Ducati 996 RS	
77	(Italy) Redamo Assirelli	Pirelli	Yamaha YZF-R7	
93	(Italy) Cristian Caliumi	Pedercini	Ducati 996 RS	
99	(Australia) Steve Martin	DFX Racing Ducati Pirelli	Ducati 998 RS	
100	(United Kingdom) Neil Hodgson	HM Plant Ducati	Ducati 998 F 01	
101	(Australia) Mat Mladin	Yoshimura Suzuki	Suzuki GSX-R750 Y	
110	(United States) Doug Chandler	HMC Ducati Racing	Ducati 998 R	
113	(Italy) Paolo Blora	Pacific	Ducati 996 RS	
120	(United States) Aaron Yates	Yoshimura Suzuki	Suzuki GSX-R750 Y	
151	(Italy) Michele Malatesta	Pro.Con.	Ducati 996 RS	
155	(United States) Ben Bostrom	Ducati L & M	Ducati 998 F02	
