= 1990 Superbike World Championship =

1990 Superbike World Championship
Previous:	1989	Next:	1991

The 1990 Superbike World Championship was the third FIM Superbike World Championship season. The season started on 18 March at Jerez and finished on 18 November at Manfeild Autocourse after 13 rounds.

Frenchman Raymond Roche won the riders' championship and Honda won the manufacturers' championship.

== Race calendar and results ==
1990 Superbike World Championship Calendar
Round		Circuit	Date	Pole position	Fastest lap	Winning rider
1	R1	(Spain) Jerez	18 March	(France) Raymond Roche	(Belgium) Stéphane Mertens	(France) Raymond Roche
1	R2	(Spain) Jerez	18 March	(France) Raymond Roche	(France) Raymond Roche	(France) Raymond Roche
2	R1	(United Kingdom) Donington	16 April	(Italy) Giancarlo Falappa	(Australia) Rob Phillis	(United States) Fred Merkel
2	R2	(United Kingdom) Donington	16 April	(Italy) Giancarlo Falappa	(France) Raymond Roche	(Italy) Giancarlo Falappa
3	R1	(Hungary) Hungaroring	30 April	(Australia) Malcolm Campbell	(France) Raymond Roche	(United States) Fred Merkel
3	R2	(Hungary) Hungaroring	30 April	(Australia) Malcolm Campbell	(United States) Fred Merkel	(France) Raymond Roche
4	R1	(Germany) Hockenheim	6 May	(France) Raymond Roche	(United States) Fred Merkel	(United States) Fred Merkel
4	R2	(Germany) Hockenheim	6 May	(France) Raymond Roche	(France) Raymond Roche	(Belgium) Stéphane Mertens
5	R1	(Canada) Mosport	3 June	(Italy) Giancarlo Falappa	(France) Raymond Roche	(France) Raymond Roche
5	R2	(Canada) Mosport	3 June	(Italy) Giancarlo Falappa	(United States) Jamie James	(France) Raymond Roche
6	R1	(United States) Brainerd	10 June	(United States) Doug Chandler	(United States) Doug Chandler	(Belgium) Stéphane Mertens
6	R2	(United States) Brainerd	10 June	(United States) Doug Chandler	(Italy) Fabrizio Pirovano	(United States) Doug Chandler
7	R1	(Austria) Österreichring	1 July	(Belgium) Stéphane Mertens	(United Kingdom) Rob McElnea	(Italy) Fabrizio Pirovano
7	R2	(Austria) Österreichring	1 July	(Belgium) Stéphane Mertens	(Belgium) Stéphane Mertens	(Belgium) Stéphane Mertens
8	R1	(Japan) Sugo	26 August	(France) Raymond Roche	(France) Raymond Roche	(France) Raymond Roche
8	R2	(Japan) Sugo	26 August	(France) Raymond Roche	(Australia) Peter Goddard	(United States) Doug Chandler
9	R1	(France) Le Mans	9 September	(Italy) Baldassarre Monti	(France) Raymond Roche	(France) Raymond Roche
9	R2	(France) Le Mans	9 September	(Italy) Baldassarre Monti	(United States) Jamie James	(France) Raymond Roche
10	R1	(Italy) Monza	7 October	(Italy) Baldassarre Monti	(Australia) Rob Phillis	(Italy) Fabrizio Pirovano
10	R2	(Italy) Monza	7 October	(Italy) Baldassarre Monti	(Australia) Rob Phillis	(Italy) Fabrizio Pirovano
11	R1	(Malaysia) Shah Alam	4 November	(Australia) Rob Phillis	(Italy) Fabrizio Pirovano	(Italy) Fabrizio Pirovano
11	R2	(Malaysia) Shah Alam	4 November	(Australia) Rob Phillis	(France) Raymond Roche	(Italy) Fabrizio Pirovano
12	R1	(Australia) Phillip Island	11 November	(Australia) Peter Goddard	(Italy) Fabrizio Pirovano	(Australia) Peter Goddard
12	R2	(Australia) Phillip Island	11 November	(Australia) Peter Goddard	(Australia) Malcolm Campbell	(Australia) Rob Phillis
13	R1	(New Zealand) Manfeild	18 November	(Australia) Rob Phillis	(United Kingdom) Brian Morrison	(United Kingdom) Terry Rymer
13	R2	(New Zealand) Manfeild	18 November	(Australia) Rob Phillis	(France) Raymond Roche	(Australia) Rob Phillis

== Entry list ==
1990 entry list
Team	Constructor	Motorcycle	No.	Rider	Rounds
Team Rumi RCM	Honda	Honda RC30	1	(United States) Fred Merkel	1–7,10
Team Rumi RCM	Honda	Honda RC30	8	(Italy) Baldassarre Monti	1–10
Total Bel-Ray Mertens Racing Lucky Strike Mertens Racing	Honda	Honda RC30	2	(Belgium) Stéphane Mertens	All
Raymond Roche Ducati	Ducati	Ducati 851	3	(France) Raymond Roche	5
Squadra Corse Ducati Lucchinelli	Ducati	Ducati 851	3	(France) Raymond Roche	1–4,6-13
Squadra Corse Ducati Lucchinelli	Ducati	Ducati 851	6	(Italy) Giancarlo Falappa	1–7
Squadra Corse Ducati Lucchinelli	Ducati	Ducati 851	34 36 42	(United States) Jamie James	8-10
Fast by Ferracci	Ducati	Ducati 851	34	(United States) Jamie James	5-6
Pirovano Racing Team	Yamaha	Yamaha OW01	4	(Italy) Fabrizio Pirovano	All
Pirovano Racing Team	Yamaha	Yamaha OW01	47 59 64	(Italy) Adriano Narducci	1,7,9-10
Team Yamaha Sweden	Yamaha	Yamaha OW01	5	(Sweden) Anders Andersson	All
Team Loctite Yamaha	Yamaha	Yamaha OW01	7 10	(United Kingdom) Terry Rymer	1–6,8-13
Team Loctite Yamaha	Yamaha	Yamaha OW01	19	(United Kingdom) Rob McElnea	1–3,6-13
Steve Parrish Racing	Yamaha	Yamaha OW01	19	(United Kingdom) Rob McElnea	4-5
Arwidson Yamaha Team	Yamaha	Yamaha OW01	9	(Finland) Jari Suhonen	All
Team Shin-Etsu Kawasaki	Kawasaki	Kawasaki ZXR-750	11	(Australia) Rob Phillis	All
Team Shin-Etsu Kawasaki	Kawasaki	Kawasaki ZXR-750	10	(Australia) Michael Dowson	11-12
Team Shin-Etsu Kawasaki	Kawasaki	Kawasaki ZXR-750	36	(Japan) Takahiro Sohwa	11
Bike 2000 Racing Team	Ducati	Ducati 851	17	(Italy) Davide Tardozzi	1–7,9-10
Bike 2000 Racing Team	Ducati	Ducati 851	45 54 61 63 88	(Italy) Mauro Mastrelli	1,3-4,7,9
Durex Suzuki	Suzuki	Suzuki GSX-R750	22	(United Kingdom) Roger Burnett	1–2,9
Suzuki Deutschland Racing	Suzuki	Suzuki GSX-R750	23	(Germany) Ernst Gschwender	1–4,7
Eagle Racing Team	Honda	Honda RC30	23	(Germany) Ernst Gschwender	8
Eagle Racing Team	Honda	Honda RC30	44 46 75	(Austria) Christian Zwedorn	3,7-8
Eagle Racing Team	Honda	Honda RC30	16	(Australia) Malcolm Campbell	3-4
Moriwaki Engineering	Honda	Honda RC30	16	(Australia) Malcolm Campbell	8,11
Telecom HRA Rothmans HRA	Honda	Honda RC30	16	(Australia) Malcolm Campbell	12-13
Telecom HRA Rothmans HRA	Honda	Honda RC30	8 20	(Australia) Daryl Beattie	12-13
Telecom HRA Rothmans HRA	Honda	Honda RC30	25	(Australia) Scott Doohan	12
Eckert Motorradtechnik	Honda	Honda RC30	25	(Switzerland) Andreas Hofmann	1,4,9
Team Green Kawasaki Deutschland	Kawasaki	Kawasaki ZXR-750	26 43 83	(Germany) Michael Galinski	1–4
Team Green Kawasaki Deutschland	Kawasaki	Kawasaki ZXR-750	30 31 46 78	(Switzerland) Edwin Weibel	1–4,7
MSW Honda	Honda	Honda RC30	45 58	(Switzerland) Edwin Weibel	9-10
Hein Gericke Racing	Yamaha	Yamaha OW01	27 28 56 71	(Germany) Peter Rubatto	1,3-4,7,9-10
Mitsui Yamaha Racing Team	Yamaha	Yamaha OW01	28	(Germany) Udo Mark	1–2,4,7-8
RH-JF Team Wellbrock & Co	Honda	Honda RC30	30 32 38 47	(Germany) Wolfgang Möckel	1–2,4,7,9-10
RH-JF Team Wellbrock & Co	Honda	Honda RC30	42	(Germany) Peter Wilmes	4
Toni Gutierrez Arbizu	Honda	Honda RC30	34	(Spain) Juan Lopez Mella	1–4,7,10
Impala Honda	Honda	Honda RC30	35 36 37 50	(Spain) Javier Arenas	1,3-4,7
Honda Britain	Honda	Honda RC30	27 39 44	(United Kingdom) Carl Fogarty	1–2,9
Honda Britain	Honda	Honda RC30	41	(United Kingdom) James Whitham	1
Tilston's Honda	Honda	Honda RC30	12 28 29 40 51 58 77	(United Kingdom) Brian Morrison	1–3,9-10,12-13
Chrerrio Team Yoshiharu	Honda	Honda RC30	30	(United Kingdom) Brian Morrison	8
Marino Fabbri	Bimota	Bimota YB4EI	43	(Italy) Marino Fabbri	1
Ianniccheri Racing	Yamaha	Yamaha OW01	44 53 56 60 62 86	(Italy) Aldeo Presciutti	1–4,7,9-10
Ianniccheri Racing	Yamaha	Yamaha OW01	58	(Italy) Marco Papa	1
Team RB Kawasaki Italia	Kawasaki	Kawasaki ZXR-750	46 56 76 84	(Italy) Mauro Ricci	1–4,7
Team Wanty	Honda	Honda RC30	30 40 47 78 66	(Belgium) René Delaby	1–10
Racing Team Henk de Vries	Yamaha	Yamaha OW01	49 66 67 72	(Netherlands) Jeffry de Vries	1–4,9
Moto Accion	Yamaha	Yamaha OW01	37 52	(Spain) Antonio Garcia	1,7
Team Caracchi	Yamaha	Yamaha OW01	39 49 53 60	(Italy) Stefano Caracchi	1–3,7,9
Team Caracchi	Ducati	Ducati 851	27	(Italy) Stefano Caracchi	10
Ducati Team Bertocchi	Ducati	Ducati 851	32	(Italy) Piergiorgio Bontempi	9-10
Gabi Competición	Honda	Honda RC30	35 48 55	(Spain) Daniel Amatriaín	1–4,7
Team Kawasaki Mobil 1	Kawasaki	Kawasaki ZXR-750	41 56	(Portugal) Manuel João	1,3
Team Pepsi Portugal	Honda	Honda RC30	57 64	(Portugal) Pedro Baptista	1–2
Fernando Gonzalez	Yamaha	Yamaha OW01	60	(Spain) Fernando Gonzalez	1
MTD Motor Team Development	Honda	Honda RC30	28 32 49 52 58 59 79	(France) Bruno Bonhuil	2-7,9-10
Oves Motor Racing	Honda	Honda RC30	63 69 78	(Sweden) Peter Granath	2-3,7,9
McMurter Honda Canada Honda Canada/Action Accessories	Honda	Honda RC30	18	(Canada) Rueben McMurter	2,5
Leesses Haulage	Honda	Honda RC30	29	(United Kingdom) Steve Chambers	2
Fowler Yamaha DTR	Yamaha	Yamaha OW01	32	(United Kingdom) Steve Williams	2
Harris Performance	Yamaha	Yamaha OW01	38	(United Kingdom) Mark Phillips	2
Yamaha Finland	Yamaha	Yamaha OW01	53 65	(Finland) Pentti Tolonen	2,4
Pepsi Suzuki	Suzuki	Suzuki GSX-R750	68	(Denmark) Rene Rassmussen	2-3
Yamaha Mortimer	Yamaha	Yamaha OW01	69	(United Kingdom) Niall Mackenzie	2
Robert Holden Racing	Honda	Honda RC30	70	(New Zealand) Rob Holden	2
Roland Busch	Kawasaki	Kawasaki ZXR-750	33 72	(Germany) Roland Busch	2-3
Schuh Racing Team	Honda	Honda RC30	50	(Germany) Manfred Fischer	2,4
Towcester Tuning Shop	Yamaha	Yamaha OW01	31 57	(United Kingdom) Ray Stringer	2-4
Kawasaki Austria	Kawasaki	Kawasaki ZXR-750	42 43 74	(Austria) Gerhard Mayerhofer	3-4,7
Kawasaki Austria	Kawasaki	Kawasaki ZXR-750	53	(Austria) Franz Pfefferkorn	7
Michael Lundwall	Kawasaki	Kawasaki ZXR-750	62 68	(Sweden) Michael Lundwall	3,4
Johann Parzer	Yamaha	Yamaha OW01	56 79	(Austria) Johann Parzer	3,7
Team Devil	Yamaha	Yamaha OW01	28	(Germany) Bodo Schmidt	4
Team Devil	Yamaha	Yamaha OW01	40	(Germany) Hans-Jurgen Gross	4
Rallye Sport	Bimota	Bimota YB4EI	29 30 37	(Germany) Michael Rudroff	4,9-10
William Jung	Honda	Honda RC30	32	(Germany) William Jung	4
Laaks Yamaha	Yamaha	Yamaha OW01	34	(Germany) Detlef Karthin	4
Team Schiller	Suzuki	Suzuki GSX-R750	36	(Germany) Leonhard Schiller	4
Fath	Honda	Honda RC30	37	(Germany) Harry Fath	4
Frank Schuck	Yamaha	Yamaha OW01	41	(Germany) Frank Schuck	4
Hans Gratzl	Honda	Honda RC30	51	(Germany) Hans Gratzl	4
Harald Dieterle	Honda	Honda RC30	52	(Germany) Harald Dieterle	4
Team Nock	Honda	Honda RC30	55 61	(Austria) Huby Meier	4,10
Thiede Power Racing	Honda	Honda RC30	31 47 57	(Germany) Lutz Fahr	4,7,9
Emonts Racing	Yamaha	Yamaha OW01	35 46	(Germany) Toni Heiler	4,7
Wiseco Yamaha	Yamaha	Yamaha OW01	35 38	(United States) Tom Kipp	5-6,8
Sunoco Yamaha Fast	Yamaha	Yamaha OW01	41	(Canada) Michel Mercier	5
Sunoco Yamaha Fast	Yamaha	Yamaha OW01	44	(Canada) Pascal Picotte	5
Jon Cornwell	Suzuki	Suzuki GSX-R750	42	(Canada) Jon Cornwell	5
Don Vance	Suzuki	Suzuki GSX-R750	57	(Canada) Don Vance	5
Suzuki Canada	Suzuki	Suzuki GSX-R750	97	(Canada) Miguel Duhamel	5
Windsor Junction	Suzuki	Suzuki GSX-R750	109	(Canada) Clyde MacDonald	5
Schmuttermeier Racing	Suzuki	Suzuki GSX-R750	121	(Canada) Oldrich Schmuttermeier Jr.	5
Schmuttermeier Racing	Suzuki	Suzuki GSX-R750	127	(Canada) Oldrich Schmuttermeier	5
Mark Green	Honda	Honda RC30	247	(Canada) Mark Green	5
DLGL	Yamaha	Yamaha OW01	999	(Canada) Jacques Guenette Jr.	5
Yamaha Canada	Yamaha	Yamaha OW01	43	(Canada) Tom Douglas	5
Gio.Ca.Moto	Ducati	Ducati 851	23	(United States) James Adamo	5
Pro-Racer	Kawasaki	Kawasaki ZXR-750	38	(Canada) Linnley Clarke	5
Rough Stock Racing	Honda	Honda RC30	91	(United States) David Kieffer	5-6
Dale Robinson	Honda	Honda RC30	33	(United Kingdom) Dale Robinson	6
Vance & Hines Yamaha	Yamaha	Yamaha OW01	51	(United States) Thomas Stevens	6
Vance & Hines Yamaha	Yamaha	Yamaha OW01	65	(United States) David Sadowski	6
Team Muzzy Kawasaki	Kawasaki	Kawasaki ZXR-750	52	(United States) Scott Russell	6
Team Muzzy Kawasaki	Kawasaki	Kawasaki ZXR-750	57	(United States) John Ashmead	6
Team Muzzy Kawasaki	Kawasaki	Kawasaki ZXR-750	37	(United States) Doug Chandler	6
Team Moving Kawasaki	Kawasaki	Kawasaki ZXR-750	45	(United States) Doug Chandler	8
Commonwealth Racing	Honda	Honda RC30	55	(United States) Randy Renfrow	6
Todd Strang	Yamaha	Yamaha OW01	58	(United States) Todd Strang	6
Ray Yoder	Suzuki	Suzuki GSX-R750	92	(United States) Ray Yoder Jr.	6
Mike Karm	Suzuki	Suzuki GSX-R750	94	(United States) Mike Karm	6
John Jacob	Yamaha	Yamaha OW01	93	(United States) John Jacob	6
Gerard Vallee	Honda	Honda RC30	55 68	(France) Gerard Vallee	7,9
MSC Rottenegg	Yamaha	Honda RC30	54 60	(Austria) Anton Rechberger	7,10
Masters Team	Yamaha	Yamaha OW01	39 50 70	(France) Jean Yves Mounier	7,9-10
Honda France	Honda	Honda RC30	15	(Portugal) Alex Vieira	7,9-10
Honda France	Honda	Honda RC30	48	(France) Jean-Michel Mattioli	7,9-10
White Endurance	Honda	Honda RC30	73	(Switzerland) Urs Meier	7
White Endurance	Honda	Honda RC30	74	(Switzerland) Robert Schafli	7
Gerhard Triebnig	Suzuki	Suzuki GSX-R750	43	(Austria) Gerhard Triebnig	7
Glenn Williams	Kawasaki	Kawasaki ZXR-750	50	(New Zealand) Glenn Williams	7
Franz Krenn	Suzuki	Suzuki GSX-R750	51	(Austria) Franz Krenn	7
MC Kopfling	Yamaha	Yamaha OW01	67	(Austria) Hans Freelinger	7
MRC Kremsmunster	Suzuki	Suzuki GSX-R750	71	(Austria) Rudolf Zeller	7
Yoshimura Suzuki Sietto GP1	Suzuki	Suzuki GSX-R750	21	(United States) Doug Polen	8
IRC - Yamaha Thailand	Yamaha	Yamaha OW01	44 47	(Thailand) Saen Choeysak	8,11
Italiya Sports - Hayashi	Yamaha	Yamaha OW01	54	(Japan) Kenji Ohsaka	8
Italiya Sports - Hayashi	Yamaha	Yamaha OW01	37	(Australia) Peter Goddard	8
Marlboro Dealer Team	Yamaha	Yamaha OW01	37	(Australia) Peter Goddard	11-12
Marlboro Dealer Team	Yamaha	Yamaha OW01	50	(Australia) Rene Bongers	11-12
Shoei-Garage Syonan with Gomibuchi	Honda	Honda RC30	33	(United Kingdom) Simon Buckmaster	8
Lucky Strike Kawasaki	Kawasaki	Kawasaki ZXR-750	22	(United Kingdom) Simon Buckmaster	11
Lucky Strike Kawasaki	Kawasaki	Kawasaki ZXR-750	23	(Australia) James Knight	11
Lucky Strike Kawasaki	Kawasaki	Kawasaki ZXR-750	32	(Malaysia) Chao Kit Choong	8
Blue Helmets MSC	Honda	Honda RC30	60	(Japan) Koichi Kobayashi	8
Blue Helmets MSC	Honda	Honda RC30	61	(Japan) Shigemasa Miwa	8
Fast RT	Honda	Honda RC30	68	(Japan) Yuichi Kaeabuchi	8
Fast RT	Honda	Honda RC30	69	(Japan) Koshei Yamamoto	8
Koyokai Dream RT	Honda	Honda RC30	53	(Japan) Masaru Shoyama	8
Koyokai Dream RT	Honda	Honda RC30	59	(Japan) Tetsuya Shirai	8
RS Katakura	Yamaha	Yamaha OW01	51	(Japan) Toshiharu Kaneko	8
RS Katakura	Yamaha	Yamaha OW01	52	(Japan) Tadaoki Hanamura	8
OVER Racing	Yamaha	Yamaha OW01	65	(Japan) Shingo Katoh	8
Kiss Racing Team	Yamaha	Yamaha OW01	66	(Japan) Masanao Aoki	8
Kanaya & Clever Wolf RT	Yamaha	Yamaha OW01	56	(Japan) Mitsuo Saito	8
Team A-Techda	Honda	Honda RC30	57	(Japan) Gakuskin Sato	8
TSR - Technical Sports Racing	Honda	Honda RC30	67	(Japan) Toshiya Kobayashi	8
Hanshin Riding School	Kawasaki	Kawasaki ZXR-750	55	(Japan) Naoto Abe	8
Kawasaki France	Kawasaki	Kawasaki ZXR-750	89	(France) Emmanuel Lentaigne	9
Christophe Mouzin	Kawasaki	Kawasaki ZXR-750	93	(France) Christophe Mouzin	9
Suzuki France	Suzuki	Suzuki GSX-R750	94	(France) Jean-Marc Deletang	9
Gauloises Yamaha	Yamaha	Yamaha OW01	51	(France) Christian Lavieille	9
Didier Hamdi	Yamaha	Yamaha OW01	53	(France) Didier Hamdi	9
Maurice Coq	Yamaha	Yamaha OW01	54	(France) Maurice Coq	9
Philippe Grillet	Yamaha	Yamaha OW01	96	(France) Philippe Grillet	9
Didier Pean	Honda	Honda RC30	98	(France) Didier Pean	9
Jean Pierre Brau	Ducati	Ducati 851	95	(France) Jean Pierre Brau	9
Bimota Experience	Bimota	Bimota YB4EI	46	(Italy) Vittorio Scatola	10
Grisoni Honda	Honda	Honda RC30	41	(Switzerland) Christian Monsch	10
Honda Suisse	Honda	Honda RC30	62	(Switzerland) Adrian Bosshard	10
Velmotor	Kawasaki	Kawasaki ZXR-750	57	(South Africa) Graham Singer	10
Ducati Belgium	Ducati	Ducati 851	63	(Belgium) Richard Hubin	10
Karl Dauer	Honda	Honda RC30	52	(Austria) Karl Dauer	10
Toni Rohrer	Honda	Honda RC30	54	(Switzerland) Toni Rohrer	10
Fabio Biliotti	Kawasaki	Kawasaki ZXR-750	49	(Italy) Fabio Biliotti	10
Romolo Balbi	Ducati	Ducati 851	61	(Italy) Romolo Balbi	10
Bob Brown Ducati	Ducati	Ducati 851	56	(Australia) Grant Hodson	12
Ducati Frasers	Ducati	Ducati 851	28	(Australia) Matt Blair	12
Lion Suzuki Malaysia	Suzuki	Suzuki GSX-R750	28	(Australia) Matt Blair	11
Lion Suzuki Malaysia	Suzuki	Suzuki GSX-R750	27	(Australia) Trevor Jordan	11
Kawasaki Thailand Racing Team	Kawasaki	Kawasaki ZXR-750	29	(Thailand) Nattavude Charoensukhawatana	11
Marlboro Yamaha Hong Leong	Yamaha	Yamaha OW01	30	(New Zealand) Simon Crafar	11
Marlboro Yamaha Hong Leong	Yamaha	Yamaha OW01	31	(Malaysia) Cletus Adi Haslam	11
Marlboro Yamaha Hong Leong	Yamaha	Yamaha OW01	32	(Malaysia) Kuan Meng Heng	11
Boon Siew Honda Malaysia Lucky Strike Esso Boon Siew (S)	Honda	Honda RC30	33	(Malaysia) Tai Seng Kooi	11
Boon Siew Honda Malaysia Lucky Strike Esso Boon Siew (S)	Honda	Honda RC30	38	(Singapore) Fabian Looi	11
Triumph Club Vienna	Suzuki	Suzuki GSX-R750	41	(Austria) Peter Smolik	11
BTX Motorcycles	Suzuki	Suzuki GSX-R750	36	(New Zealand) Ian Short	12
Mick Hone Motorcycles	Suzuki	Suzuki GSX-R750	45	(Australia) Marty Craggill	12
Mick Hone Motorcycles	Suzuki	Suzuki GSX-R750	46	(Australia) Steve Martin	12
Peter Guest Racing	Yamaha	Yamaha OW01	41	(Australia) Peter Guest	12
Andrew Roberts Yamaha Pitmans	Yamaha	Yamaha OW01	53	(Australia) Andrew Roberts	12
Willing Motorcycles	Yamaha	Yamaha OW01	33	(New Zealand) Eddie Kattenberg	12
Ron Arnold	Honda	Honda RC30	32	(Australia) Mark Arnold	12
BM&J Builders	Honda	Honda RC30	31	(Australia) Mark Fissenden	12-13
Darred Motor Bodyworks	Honda	Honda RC30	54	(Australia) David Tarrant	12
Meakin Mower Sales & Service	Honda	Honda RC30	30	(Australia) Daniel Vanolini	12
Nova Honda	Honda	Honda RC30	38	(Australia) Michael O'Connor	12
Cosway Motorcycles	Kawasaki	Kawasaki ZXR-750	55	(Australia) Robert Scolyer	12
Cosway Motorcycles	Kawasaki	Kawasaki ZXR-750	57	(Australia) Steve Watts	12
Kawasaki Racing Australia	Kawasaki	Kawasaki ZXR-750	14	(New Zealand) Aaron Slight	12-13
Ducati Australia	Ducati	Ducati 851	34	(Australia) Roy Leslie	12
Ducati QLD Kwikswax	Ducati	Ducati 851	47	(Australia) Simon Tate	12
Michael Bubb	Honda	Honda RC30	40	(Australia) Michael Bubb	12
Bay Yamaha	Yamaha	Yamaha OW01	32	(New Zealand) Tony Rees	13
Super Angel	Yamaha	Yamaha OW01	40	(New Zealand) Andrew Stroud	13
Russell Josiah	Kawasaki	Kawasaki ZXR-750	27	(New Zealand) Russell Josiah	13
Brian Bernard	Honda	Honda RC30	28	(New Zealand) Brian Bernard	13
Paul Pavletich	Honda	Honda RC30	34	(New Zealand) Paul Pavletich	13
Brian Billet	Honda	Honda RC30	36	(New Zealand) Brian Billet	13
Rob Lewis	Kawasaki	Kawasaki ZXR-750	30	(New Zealand) Rob Lewis	13
Jason McEwen	Kawasaki	Kawasaki GPX 750R	31	(New Zealand) Jason McEwen	13
Mike King	Ducati	Ducati 851	33	(New Zealand) Mike King	13
Brent Curtis	Suzuki	Suzuki GSX-R750	37	(New Zealand) Brent Curtis	13
Kevin Grey	Suzuki	Suzuki GSX-R750	38	(New Zealand) Kevin Grey	13

== Championship standings ==
=== Riders' standings ===
Pos.	Rider	Bike	ESP (Spain)		GBR (United Kingdom)		HUN (Hungary)		GER (Germany)		CAN (Canada)		USA (United States)		AUT (Austria)		JPN (Japan)		FRA (France)		ITA (Italy)		MAS (Malaysia)		AUS (Australia)		NZL (New Zealand)		Pts
Pos.	Rider	Bike	R1	R2	R1	R2	R1	R2	R1	R2	R1	R2	R1	R2	R1	R2	R1	R2	R1	R2	R1	R2	R1	R2	R1	R2	R1	R2	Pts
1	(France) Roche	Ducati	1	1	2	2	2	1	Ret	2	1	1	2	4	8	2	1	6	1	1	3	6	4	3	5	8	2	Ret	382
2	(Italy) Pirovano	Yamaha	6	8	5	5	3	8	8	5	3	5	8	6	1	3	4	4	Ret	2	1	1	1	1	2	5	Ret	4	325
3	(Belgium) Mertens	Honda	3	4	3	8	6	3	Ret	1	6	3	1	2	2	1	11	8	3	3	2	Ret	3	4	Ret	9	6	Ret	300
4	(Australia) Phillis	Kawasaki	4	5	4	7	10	Ret	Ret	DNS	16	8	6	Ret	3	Ret	6	5	5	6	4	4	2	2	Ret	1	5	1	238
5	(United Kingdom) McElnea	Yamaha	8	6	Ret	Ret	5	4	2	6	11	6	5	5	6	6	12	Ret	6	5	5	3	5	5	12	Ret	3	Ret	218
6	(United States) Merkel	Honda	2	3	1	3	1	6	1	3	5	10	7	10	7	4					Ret	5							197
7	(United Kingdom) Rymer	Yamaha	7	7	Ret	DNS	8	5	Ret	7	4	7	4	3			Ret	DNS	Ret	Ret			7	7	9	Ret	1	2	158
8	(Italy) Monti	Honda	Ret	11	10	11	9	11	Ret	14	7	9	11	11	9	5	2	3	4	4	Ret	2							149
9	(Sweden) Andersson	Yamaha	9	12	Ret	9	7	Ret	7	12	10	11	Ret	12	4	9	Ret	Ret	11	Ret	9	11	12	12	Ret	15	7	6	120
10	(Finland) Suhonen	Yamaha	17	Ret	Ret	Ret	16	14	4	10	9	13	12	8	Ret	11	26	11	10	14	6	7	9	8	10	Ret	Ret	5	112
11	(Italy) Falappa	Ducati	5	2	7	1	Ret	7	3	4	Ret	DNS			DNS	DNS													94
12	(United States) James	Ducati									2	2	Ret	Ret			7	7	2	Ret	7	8							86
13	(Australia) Goddard	Yamaha															5	2					6	6	1	2			85
14	(Australia) Campbell	Honda					4	2	Ret	9							Ret	15					8	9	4	3	DNS	DNS	81
15	(United States) Chandler	Kawasaki											3	1			3	1											70
16	(United Kingdom) Morrison	Honda	13	Ret	14	15	15	16	Ret	DNS							16	10	Ret	15	8	9			13	11	10	8	51
17	(Germany) Mark	Yamaha	Ret	15	9	10			6	11					Ret	10	15	13											39
18	(Germany) Gschwender	Suzuki	10	9	15	12	13	Ret	DNQ	DNQ					5	14	Ret	17											34
19	(New Zealand) Slight	Kawasaki																							8	7	Ret	3	32
20	(Australia) Dowson	Kawasaki																					18	14	3	4			30
21	(United Kingdom) Fogarty	Honda	14	Ret	6	6													Ret	8									30
22	(Switzerland) Weibel	Kawasaki	15	Ret	16	13	Ret	10	25	13					Ret	20			12	9	10	Ret							30
23	(Switzerland) Hofmann	Honda	16	13					5	8									14	11									29
24	(Spain) Amatriain	Honda	18	10	Ret	16	11	12	9	16					10	19													28
25	(Netherlands) de Vries	Yamaha	Ret	14	17	14	14	13	12	15									13	17	15	10							24
26	(Italy) Tardozzi	Ducati	11	Ret	8	Ret	Ret	9	Ret	Ret	Ret	Ret	13	Ret	Ret	Ret			DNS	DNS	Ret	DNS							23
27	(Australia) Bongers	Yamaha																					10	10	6	Ret			22
28	(Canada) Mercier	Yamaha									8	4																	21
29	(France) Mattioli	Honda													11	12			8	12	18	Ret							21
30	(Australia) Doohan	Honda																							7	6			19
31	(Portugal) Vieira	Honda													Ret	7			Ret	13	11	14							19
32	(France) Mounier	Yamaha													14	8			DNS	7	DNS	DNS							19
33	(New Zealand) Stroud	Yamaha																									8	7	17
34	(Italy) Caracchi	Ducati	Ret	DNS	Ret	DNS	Ret	17							12	Ret			9	10	Ret	16							17
35	(United Kingdom) Mackenzie	Yamaha			13	4																							16
36	(United States) Russell	Kawasaki											10	7															15
37	(New Zealand) Rees	Yamaha																									9	9	14
38	(Australia) Beattie	Honda																							DSQ	Ret	4	Ret	13
39	(Spain) Mella	Honda	12	Ret	19	Ret	12	Ret	11	Ret					Ret	16					Ret	23							13
40	(New Zealand) Josiah	Kawasaki																									11	10	11
41	(Australia) Martin	Suzuki																							11	10			11
42	(United Kingdom) Stringer	Yamaha			11	17	19	22	10	17																			11
43	(Japan) Saito	Yamaha															13	9											10
44	(Australia) Knight	Kawasaki																					11	11					10
45	(France) Lavieille	Yamaha																	7	Ret									9
46	(New Zealand) Lewis	Kawasaki																									12	11	9
47	(United States) Kipp	Yamaha									14	14	14	13			Ret	Ret											9
48	(United States) Polen	Suzuki															8	DNS											8
49	(Japan) Osaka	Yamaha															9	Ret											7
50	(United States) Stevens	Yamaha											Ret	9															7
51	(United States) Sadowski	Yamaha											9	Ret															7
52	(Canada) Picotte	Yamaha									13	12																	7
53	(Switzerland) H. Meier	Honda							13	20											21	12							7
54	(Belgium) Delaby	Honda	23	Ret	22	20	18	Ret	16	19	15	16	Ret	14	15	13	Ret	23	20	22	Ret	20							7
55	(Japan) Kato	Yamaha															10	Ret											6
56	(Australia) Guest	Yamaha																							14	12			6
57	(New Zealand) Crafar	Yamaha																					13	13					6
58	(Canada) Duhamel	Suzuki									12	15																	5
59	(New Zealand) Billet	Honda																									14	13	5
60	(Switzerland) Bosshard	Honda																			14	13							5
61	(New Zealand) King	Ducati																									16	12	4
62	(Italy) Biliotti	Kawasaki																			12	19							4
63	(Japan) Miwa	Honda															17	12											4
64	(United Kingdom) Whitham	Honda	20	Ret	12	Ret																							4
65	(Australia) Fissenden	Honda																							21	22	13	15	4
66	(Germany) Rudroff	Bimota							15	Ret									Ret	24	13	26							4
67	(Australia) O'Connor	Honda																							16	13			3
68	(Italy) Ricci	Kawasaki	Ret	Ret	23	Ret	21	21	DNS	DNS					13	Ret													3
69	(New Zealand) Curtis	Suzuki																									15	14	3
70	(Australia) Roberts	Yamaha																							Ret	14			2
71	(Malaysia) Seng Kooi	Honda																					14	17					2
72	(Japan) Hanamura	Yamaha															20	14											2
73	(Japan) Kobayashi	Honda															14	19											2
74	(Germany) Möckel	Honda	26	20	Ret	DNS			14	21					20	27			19	23	17	22							2
75	(France) Bonhuil	Honda			24	Ret	22	24	17	Ret	17	17	15	15	18	Ret			Ret	19	Ret	Ret							2
76	(Australia) Short	Suzuki																							15	17			1
77	(Thailand) Choeisak	Yamaha															28	28					Ret	15					1
78	(Thailand) Nattavude	Kawasaki																					15	16					1
79	(Switzerland) Monsch	Honda																			Ret	15							1
80	(France) Coq	Yamaha																	15	16									1
81	(Austria) Zwedorn	Honda					25	Ret							Ret	15	25	25											1
82	(Germany) Galinski	Kawasaki	19	Ret	DNS	DNS	17	15	18	Ret																			1
	(South Africa) Singer	Kawasaki																			16	17							0
	(Italy) Presciutti	Yamaha	Ret	DNS	Ret	Ret	29	18	DNQ	DNQ					21	21			16	Ret	Ret	Ret							0
	(Spain) Garcia	Yamaha	22	18											16	22													0
	(Australia) Scolyer	Kawasaki																							18	16			0
	(United States) Kieffer	Honda									20	20	19	16															0
	(Spain) Arenas	Honda	Ret	16			24	19	23	Ret					24	25													0
	(Japan) Aoki	Yamaha															19	16											0
	(Australia) Jordan	Suzuki																					16	Ret					0
	(United States) Ashmead	Kawasaki											16	DNS															0
	(Italy) Mastrelli	Ducati	21	19			20	23	DNQ	DNQ					19	17			DNQ	DNQ									0
	(United Kingdom) Buckmaster	Honda															Ret	26											0
	(United Kingdom) Buckmaster	Kawasaki																					17	19					0
	(New Zealand) Kattenberg	Yamaha																							17	19			0
	(United States) Karm	Suzuki											21	17															0
	(Italy) Papa	Yamaha	24	17																									0
	(Switzerland) Schäfli	Honda													17	24													0
	(United Kingdom) Robinson	Honda											17	Ret															0
	(France) Deletang	Suzuki																	17	Ret									0
	(New Zealand) Grey	Suzuki																									17	Ret	0
	(Germany) Rubatto	Yamaha	Ret	Ret			23	20	Ret	18					Ret	18			Ret	21	Ret	Ret							0
	(United Kingdom) Chambers	Honda			18	18																							0
	(Japan) Shirai	Honda															18	18											0
	(France) Lentaigne	Kawasaki																	18	20									0
	(Canada) Douglas	Yamaha									18	Ret																	0
	(Canada) Clarke	Kawasaki									Ret	18																	0
	(United States) Jacob	Yamaha											18	Ret															0
	(France) Mouzin	Kawasaki																	Ret	18									0
	(Italy) Balbi	Ducati																			Ret	18							0
	(Malaysia) Haslam	Yamaha																					Ret	18					0
	(Australia) Bubb	Honda																							Ret	18			0
	(Canada) Macdonald	Suzuki									19	19																	0
	(Australia) Arnold	Honda																							19	20			0
	(Canada) McMurter	Honda			21	19					DNS	DNS																	0
	(Austria) Dauer	Honda																			19	21							0
	(Germany) Schmidt	Yamaha							19	Ret																			0
	(United Kingdom) Williams	Yamaha			20	21																							0
	(Japan) Yamamoto	Honda															21	20											0
	(Australia) Vanolini	Honda																							20	21			0
	(Germany) Wilmes	Honda							20	23																			0
	(Switzerland) Röhrer	Honda																			20	24							0
	(United States) Yoder Jr.	Suzuki											20	DNS															0
	(Canada) Schmuttermeier Jr.	Suzuki									21	21																	0
	(Japan) Kobayashi	Honda															22	21											0
	(Finland) Tolonen	Yamaha			26	23			21	Ret																			0
	(Portugal) Baptista	Honda	27	21	DNQ	DNQ																							0
	(United Kingdom) Burnett	Suzuki	Ret	Ret	Ret	Ret													21	DNS									0
	(Sweden) Granath	Honda			27	Ret	Ret	DNS							22	Ret			22	25									0
	(Germany) Fahr	Honda							24	22					25	23			DNQ	DNQ									0
	(Japan) Kaneko	Yamaha															23	22											0
	(Germany) Fischer	Honda			25	24			22	Ret																			0
	(Italy) Narducci	Yamaha	DNQ	DNQ											DNQ	DNQ			DNQ	DNQ	22	25							0
	(United Kingdom) Phillips	Yamaha			Ret	22																							0
	(Canada) Vance	Suzuki									22	Ret																	0
	(Austria) Rechberger	Yamaha													23	28					Ret	27							0
	(Japan) Sato	Honda															24	24											0
	(Germany) Gross	Yamaha							Ret	24																			0
	(Denmark) Rasmussen	Suzuki			Ret	DNS	Ret	25																					0
	(Italy) Fabbri	Bimota	25	Ret																									0
	(Austria) Parzer	Yamaha					26	26							DNQ	DNQ													0
	(Austria) Mairhofer	Kawasaki					27	Ret	DNQ	DNQ					Ret	26													0
	(Malaysia) Choong	Kawasaki															27	27											0
	(Portugal) João	Kawasaki	DNQ	DNQ			28	27																					0
	(Japan) Shoyama	Honda															29	DNS											0
	(France) Vallée	Honda													Ret	DNS			Ret	Ret									0
	(Germany) Heiler	Yamaha							Ret	DNS					Ret	DNS													0
	(Australia) Blair	Suzuki																					Ret	Ret					0
	(Australia) Blair	Ducati																							DNS	DNS			0
	(United States) Adamo	Ducati									Ret	Ret																	0
	(United States) Renfrow	Honda											Ret	Ret															0
	(United States) Strang	Yamaha											Ret	Ret															0
	(Italy) Scatola	Bimota																			Ret	Ret							0
	(Malaysia) Meng Heng	Yamaha																					Ret	Ret					0
	(Singapore) Looi	Honda																					Ret	Ret					0
	(Japan) Sohwa	Kawasaki																					Ret	Ret					0
	(Australia) Watts	Kawasaki																							Ret	Ret			0
	(Australia) Tate	Ducati																							Ret	Ret			0
	(Australia) Leslie	Ducati																							Ret	Ret			0
	(Italy) Bontempi	Ducati																	DNS	Ret	DNS	DNS							0
	(New Zealand) Holden	Honda			Ret	DNS																							0
	(Sweden) Lundvall	Kawasaki					Ret	DNS	DNQ	DNQ																			0
	(Canada) Guenette Jr.	Yamaha									Ret	DNS																	0
	(Canada) Cornwell	Suzuki									Ret	DNS																	0
	(Belgium) Hubin	Ducati																			Ret	DNS							0
	(Australia) Craggill	Suzuki																							Ret	DNS			0
	(New Zealand) Pavletich	Ducati																									Ret	DNS	0
	(France) Brau	Ducati																	DNS	DNS									0
	(France) Hamdi	Yamaha																	DNS	DNS									0
	(Australia) Tarrant	Honda																							DNS	DNS			0
	(Australia) Hodson	Ducati																							DNS	DNS			0
	(New Zealand) McEwen	Kawasaki																									DNS	DNS	0
	(Germany) Busch	Kawasaki			DNQ	DNQ			DNQ	DNQ																			0
	(Spain) Gonzalez	Yamaha	DNQ	DNQ																									0
	(Germany) Fath	Honda							DNQ	DNQ																			0
	(Germany) Karthin	Yamaha							DNQ	DNQ																			0
	(Germany) Jung	Honda							DNQ	DNQ																			0
	(Germany) Gratzl	Honda							DNQ	DNQ																			0
	(Germany) Schuck	Yamaha							DNQ	DNQ																			0
	(Germany) Dieterle	Honda							DNQ	DNQ																			0
	(Germany) Schiller	Suzuki							DNQ	DNQ																			0
	(Canada) Walsh	Suzuki									DNQ	DNQ																	0
	(Canada) Schmuttermeier Sr.	Suzuki									DNQ	DNQ																	0
	(Canada) Green	Honda									DNQ	DNQ																	0
	(Switzerland) U. Meier	Honda													DNQ	DNQ													0
	(New Zealand) Williams	Kawasaki													DNQ	DNQ													0
	(Austria) Pfefferkorn	Kawasaki													DNQ	DNQ													0
	(Austria) Zeller	Suzuki													DNQ	DNQ													0
	(Austria) Freilinger	Yamaha													DNQ	DNQ													0
	(Austria) Krenn	Suzuki													DNQ	DNQ													0
	(Austria) Triebnig	Suzuki													DNQ	DNQ													0
	(France) Péan	Honda																	DNQ	DNQ									0
	(France) Grillet	Yamaha																	DNQ	DNQ									0
	(Austria) Smolik	Suzuki																					DNQ	DNQ					0
Pos.	Rider	Bike	ESP (Spain)		GBR (United Kingdom)		HUN (Hungary)		GER (Germany)		CAN (Canada)		USA (United States)		AUT (Austria)		JPN (Japan)		FRA (France)		ITA (Italy)		MAS (Malaysia)		AUS (Australia)		NZL (New Zealand)		Pts

=== Manufacturers' standings ===
Pos	Manufacturer	Pts
1	(Japan) Honda	399
2	(Italy) Ducati	393
3	(Japan) Yamaha	378
4	(Japan) Kawasaki	300
5	(Japan) Suzuki	49
6	(Italy) Bimota	4

== Notes ==
- The points allocation system was: 1st=20, 2nd=17, 3rd=15, 4th=13, 5th=11, 6th=10, 7th=9, 8th=8, 9th=7, 10th=6, 11th=5, 12th=4, 13th=3, 14th=2, 15th=1
