= Raymond Roche =

French motorcycle racer

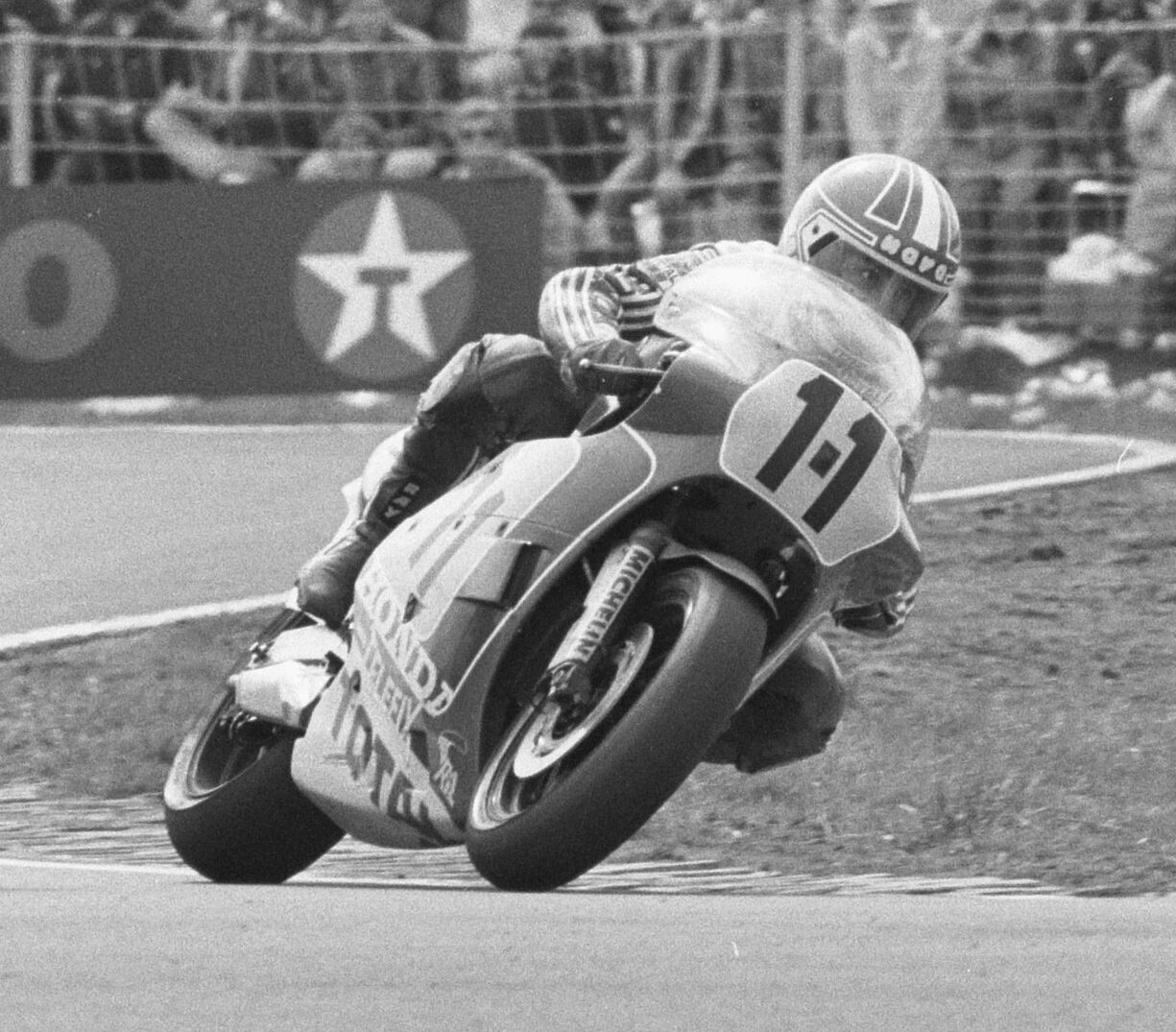
- Roche at the 1984 Dutch TT
- Nationality: French
- Born: February 21, 1957 (age 69); Ollioules, France
Motorcycle racing career statistics
Grand Prix motorcycle racing
Active years	1978, 1980-1989
First race	1978 250cc French Grand Prix
Last race	1989 500cc French Grand Prix
Team(s)	Honda, Yamaha, Cagiva
Starts / Wins / Podiums / Poles / F. laps / Points; 83 / 0 / 10 / 2 / 0 / 265
Superbike World Championship
Active years	1988–1992
Manufacturers	Ducati
Championships	1 (1990)
1992 championship position	2nd
Starts / Wins / Podiums / Poles / F. laps / Points; 97 / 23 / 47 / 9 / 25 / 1222

Raymond Roche (born 21 February 1957 in Ollioules) is a French former professional Grand Prix motorcycle road racer.

== Motorcycle racing career ==
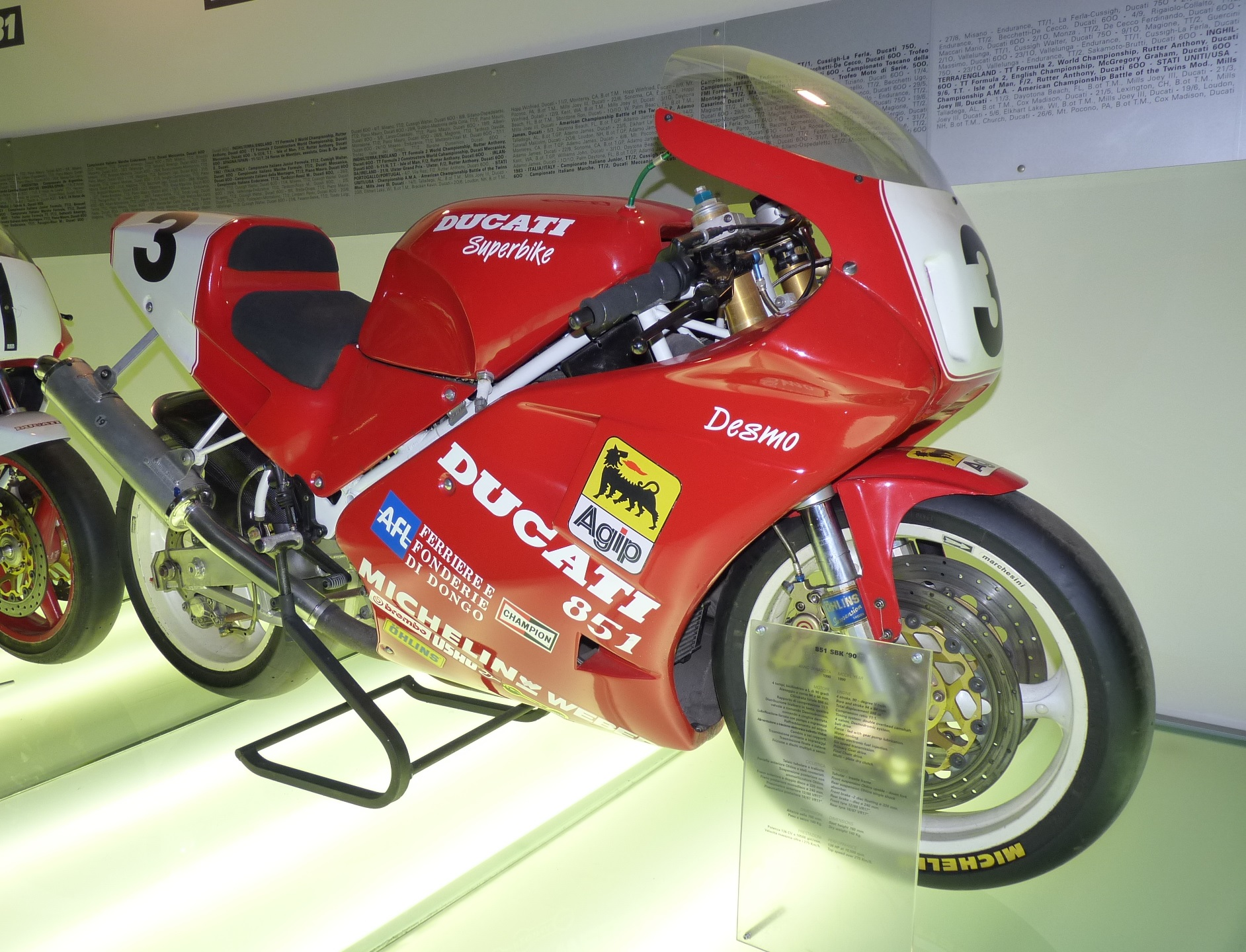
The Ducati 851 SBK '90 driven by Roche in 1990 Superbike World Championship season, won by him.

In 1981, Roche teamed up with Jean Lafond to win the FIM Endurance World Championship. His best year in Grand Prix racing was in 1984, where he finished third in the 500cc world championship behind Eddie Lawson and Randy Mamola.

After retiring from Grand Prix racing, Roche competed in the Superbike World Championship as a member of the Ducati factory racing team, winning that championship in 1990, and finishing as runner-up in 1991 and 1992. He is still only one of four native European riders from outside of the United Kingdom to have won the World Superbike Title.

== Career statistics ==
=== Grand Prix motorcycle racing ===
==== Races by year ====
(key) (Races in bold indicate pole position) (Races in italics indicate fastest lap)

Year	Class	Bike	1	2	3	4	5	6	7	8	9	10	11	12	13	14	15	Pos.	Pts
1976	250cc	Yamaha	FRA; Ret	NAT	YUG	IOM	NED	BEL	SWE	FIN	CZE	GER	SPA					NC	0
1977	350cc	Yamaha	VEN	GER	NAT; Ret	SPA	FRA; Ret	YUG	NED	SWE	FIN	CZE	GBR					NC	0
1978	250cc	Yamaha	VEN	SPA	FRA; 6	NAT; 8	NED	BEL; Ret	SWE	FIN; Ret	GBR; 3	GER; 8	CZE; 6	YUG				11th	26
1978	350cc	Yamaha	VEN	AUT	FRA; 9	NAT	NED	SWE	FIN	GBR; Ret	GER	CZE; 10	YUG					22nd	3
1979	250cc	Yamaha	VEN	GER; Ret	NAT; DNQ	SPA	YUG	NED	BEL	SWE	FIN	GBR	CZE; Ret	FRA; 11				NC	0
1980	500cc	Yamaha	NAT; Ret	SPA	FRA; 11	NED; DNQ	BEL; 12	FIN; 10	GBR; 14	GER								23rd	1
1981	500cc	Suzuki	AUT; DNS	GER; 15	NAT; 15	FRA; Ret	YUG	NED	BEL	RSM	GBR	FIN	SWE					NC	0
1982	500cc	Suzuki	ARG	AUT	FRA; Ret	SPA	NAT; 11	NED; 10	BEL; Ret	YUG	GBR	SWE	RSM	GER				28th	1
1983	500cc	Honda	RSA; 7	FRA; Ret	NAT; 6	GER; 7	SPA; Ret	AUT; Ret	YUG; Ret	NED; 9	BEL; DNS	GBR	SWE; 8	RSM; 7				10th	22
1984	500cc	Honda	RSA; 2	NAT; 3	SPA; 3	AUT; 6	GER; 5	FRA; Ret	YUG; 3	NED; 2	BEL; 3	**GBR**; Ret	SWE; 2	**RSM**; 2				3rd	99
1985	500cc	Yamaha	RSA; Ret	SPA; 5	GER; 13	NAT; 7	AUT; 10	YUG; 6	NED; Ret	BEL; 5	FRA; 2	GBR; 6	SWE; 8	RSM; 4				7th	50
1986	500cc	Honda	SPA; 6	NAT; Ret	GER; 7	AUT; Ret	YUG; 7	NED; 6	BEL; Ret	FRA; Ret	GBR; 6	SWE; 5	RSM; 5					8th	35
1987	500cc	Cagiva	JPN; 10	SPA; Ret	GER; Ret	NAT; 9	AUT; Ret	YUG; 5	NED; Ret	FRA; Ret	GBR	SWE	CZE; Ret	RSM; Ret	POR; Ret	BRA; Ret	ARG; 5	13th	15
1988	500cc	Cagiva	JPN; Ret	USA; Ret	SPA; 11	EXP; Ret	NAT; 9	GER	AUT	NED	BEL	YUG; Ret	FRA; DNS	GBR; Ret	SWE; 15	CZE; Ret	BRA	20th	13
1989	500cc	Cagiva	JPN	AUS	USA	SPA	NAT; DNS	GER	AUT	YUG	NED	BEL	FRA; Ret	GBR	SWE	CZE	BRA	NC	0
1991	500cc	Cagiva	JPN	AUS	USA	SPA	ITA	GER	AUT	EUR	NED	FRA; DNS	GBR	RSM	CZE	VDM	MAL	NC	0

=== Superbike World Championship ===
==== Races by year ====
(key) (Races in bold indicate pole position) (Races in italics indicate fastest lap)

Year	Make	1		2		3		4		5		6		7		8		9		10		11		12		13		Pos.	Pts
Year	Make	R1	R2	R1	R2	R1	R2	R1	R2	R1	R2	R1	R2	R1	R2	R1	R2	R1	R2	R1	R2	R1	R2	R1	R2	R1	R2	Pos.	Pts
1988	Ducati	GBR	GBR	HUN	HUN	GER	GER	AUT	AUT	JPN	JPN	FRA; Ret	FRA; DNS	POR; Ret	POR; 26	AUS	AUS	NZL	NZL									NC	0
1989	Ducati	**GBR**; Ret	**GBR**; Ret	HUN; 2	HUN; Ret	CAN; 2	CAN; Ret	USA; 1	USA; 1	**AUT**; 2	**AUT**; 10	**FRA**; 3	**FRA**; 2	JPN; 13	JPN; 18	**GER**; 1	**GER**; 1	ITA; Ret	ITA; 1	AUS; 4	AUS; 2	NZL; Ret	NZL; Ret					3rd	222
1990	Ducati	**SPA**; 1	**SPA**; 1	GBR; 2	GBR; 2	HUN; 2	HUN; 1	**GER**; Ret	**GER**; 2	CAN; 1	CAN; 1	USA; 2	USA; 4	AUT; 8	AUT; 2	**JPN**; 1	**JPN**; 6	FRA; 1	FRA; 1	ITA; 3	ITA; 6	MAL; 4	MAL; 3	AUS; 5	AUS; 8	NZL; 2	NZL; Ret	1st	391
1991	Ducati	GBR; Ret	GBR; 2	SPA; Ret	SPA; 3	CAN	CAN	USA; DNS	USA; DNS	AUT; 3	AUT; 3	SMR; 4	SMR; 2	SWE; Ret	SWE; 3	JPN; 6	JPN; 2	MAL; 1	MAL; 1	GER; 2	GER; 1	FRA; 2	FRA; 2	ITA; 2	ITA; 1	AUS	AUS	2nd	282
1992	Ducati	SPA; 7	SPA; 1	GBR; 1	GBR; 2	GER; 5	GER; 4	BEL; Ret	BEL; 4	SPA; 2	SPA; 6	**AUT**; 28	**AUT**; 3	**ITA**; 1	**ITA**; 1	MAL; 1	MAL; 2	JPN; 5	JPN; 8	NED; 3	NED; 3	ITA; Ret	ITA; 2	AUS; Ret	AUS; 1	NZL; 3	NZL; 4	2nd	336

=== FIM Endurance World Championship ===
Year	Bike	Rider	TC
1981	Kawasaki Heavy Industries	(France) Raymond Roche (France) Jean Lafond	1st
