= Ducati 888 =

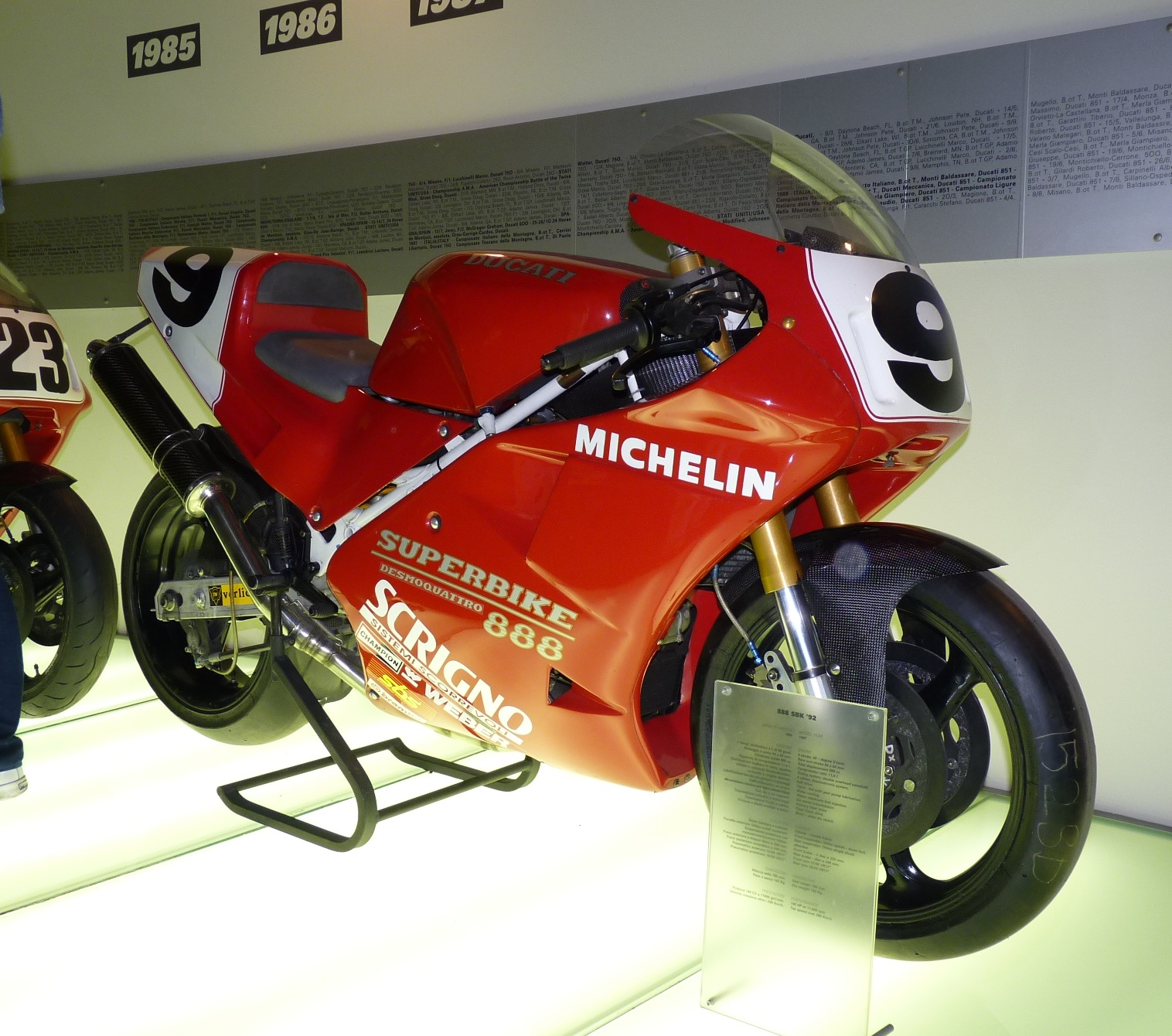
- Manufacturer: Ducati
- Production: 1991–1994
- Predecessor: Ducati 851
- Successor: Ducati 916
- Class: Sport bike
- Engine: liquid cooled 888 cc (54 cu in), 90° V-twin, fuel injected 4V/cyl. desmodromic
- Bore / stroke: 94.0 mm × 64.0 mm (3.70 in × 2.52 in)
- Compression ratio: 11.0:1
- Power: 70.1 kW (94.0 hp) @ 8,740 rpm
- Torque: 80.5 N⋅m (59.4 lb⋅ft) at 7,000 rpm
- Transmission: 6 speed, chain drive
- Frame type: Tubular steel trellis frame
- Brakes: Front: Dual disc Rear: Single disc
- Tires: Michelin Hi-Sport 120/70ZR17 (f) 180/55ZR17 (r)
- Rake, trail: 24.5°, 99 mm (3.9 in)
- Wheelbase: 1,410 mm (55.5 in)
- Seat height: 790 mm (31.0 in)
- Weight: 204 kg (449 lb) (tank empty) (dry); 217 kg (479 lb) (wet)
- Fuel capacity: 19 L; 4.2 imp gal (5.0 US gal)

The Ducati 888 is a motorcycle manufactured by Ducati between 1991 and 1994 as an upgrade to the Ducati 851. The earlier 851 had introduced liquid cooling, computerized fuel injection and four-valve heads to the company's two cylinder motors. In 1991 Ducati increased the capacity of the 851 to 888 cc to create the 888. Both engines featured the Desmoquattro valvetrain concept in which a four valve per cylinder motor was given desmodromic valve actuation, with cams both opening and closing the valves. Ducati's desmodromic system reduces the frictional penalty from conventional valve springs.

== Overview ==
Production figures known for the various models are:

1991 models: 1200 × 851 Stradas, 534 × SP3 & 16 × SPS. A total of 1850 units.

1992 models: 1402 × 851 Stradas, 500 × SP4 & 101 × SPS. A total of 2003 units.

1993 models: 1280 × 888 Stradas, 500 × SP5 & 290 × SPO - for the American market. A total of 2070 units.

1994 models: 1571 × 888 Stradas & 100 SPO for the American market. A total of 1671 units.

There was a grand total of 7594 units produced across all four years. The "SPO" version was developed for the North American market as the new SP5 could not be made road legal; SPO stands for Sport Production Omologato ("homologated"), although the specifications were closer to the road-oriented, European Strada model than to the SP5.

Riding the Ducati 888, Doug Polen won first place in the 1991 and 1992 World Superbike Championships. After losing to Kawasaki in the 1993 World Superbike Championship, Ducati ceased production of the Ducati 888 and released the Ducati 916 which had a larger engine capacity.

Continuing refinement yielded the next two generations of the Ducati Desmoquattro superbike, resulting in the 916/996 and 999 lines.

In a 1993 road test of the 888SPO, Cycle World measured a 1/4 mile (402 m) time of 11.25 seconds at 123.45 mph (199 km/h), and a 0–60 mph (97 km/h) acceleration of 3.3 seconds. They measured a top speed of 152 mph (245 km/h) and a braking distance of 60 to 0 mph (97 to 0 km/h) of 37 m (123 ft). The wet weight of their test bike was 225 kg (497 lb) and the rear-wheel horsepower was 94.0 hp (70.1 kW) at 8,740 rpm, and torque was 81 N⋅m (59.4 lb⋅ft) at 7,000 rpm.

Ducati said that the 1992 racing version of the 888, the SBK, had a dry weight of 142 kg (313 lb), produced 134 PS (99 kW; 132 hp) at 12,000 rpm, and was capable of a top speed of more than 290 km/h (180 mph).

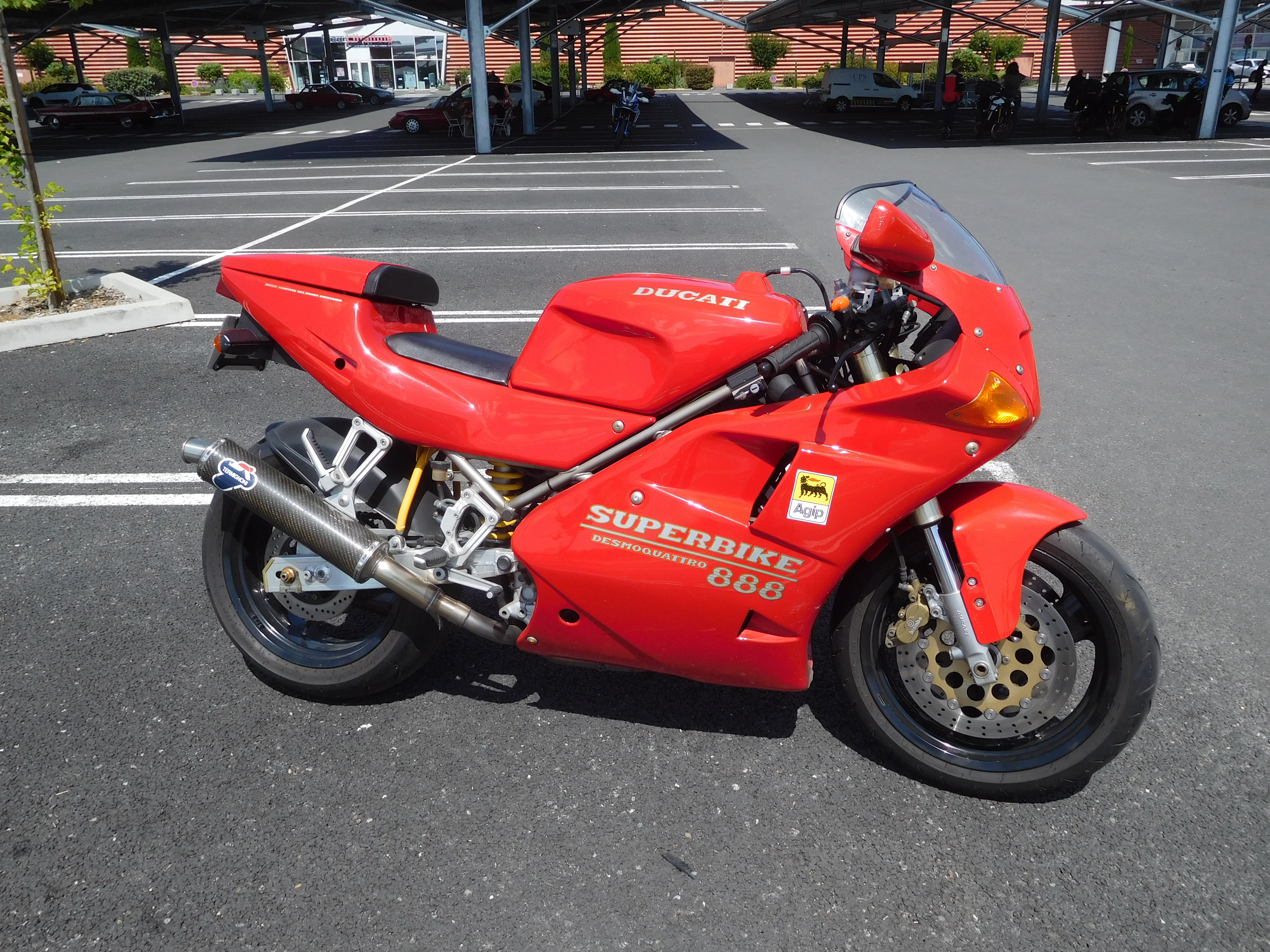
Ducati 888 Strada (1993)

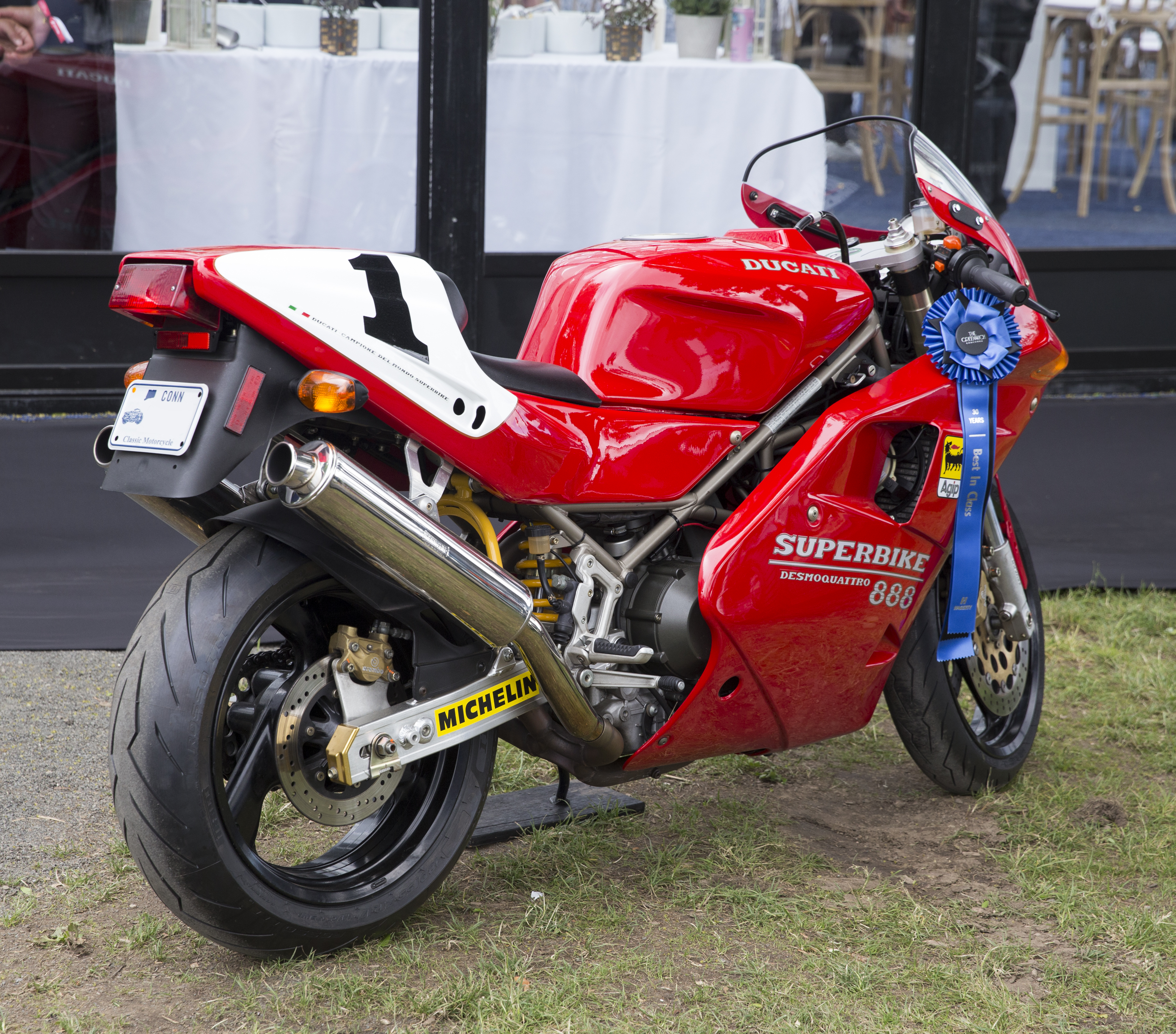
Ducati 888 SPO (US; 1993)

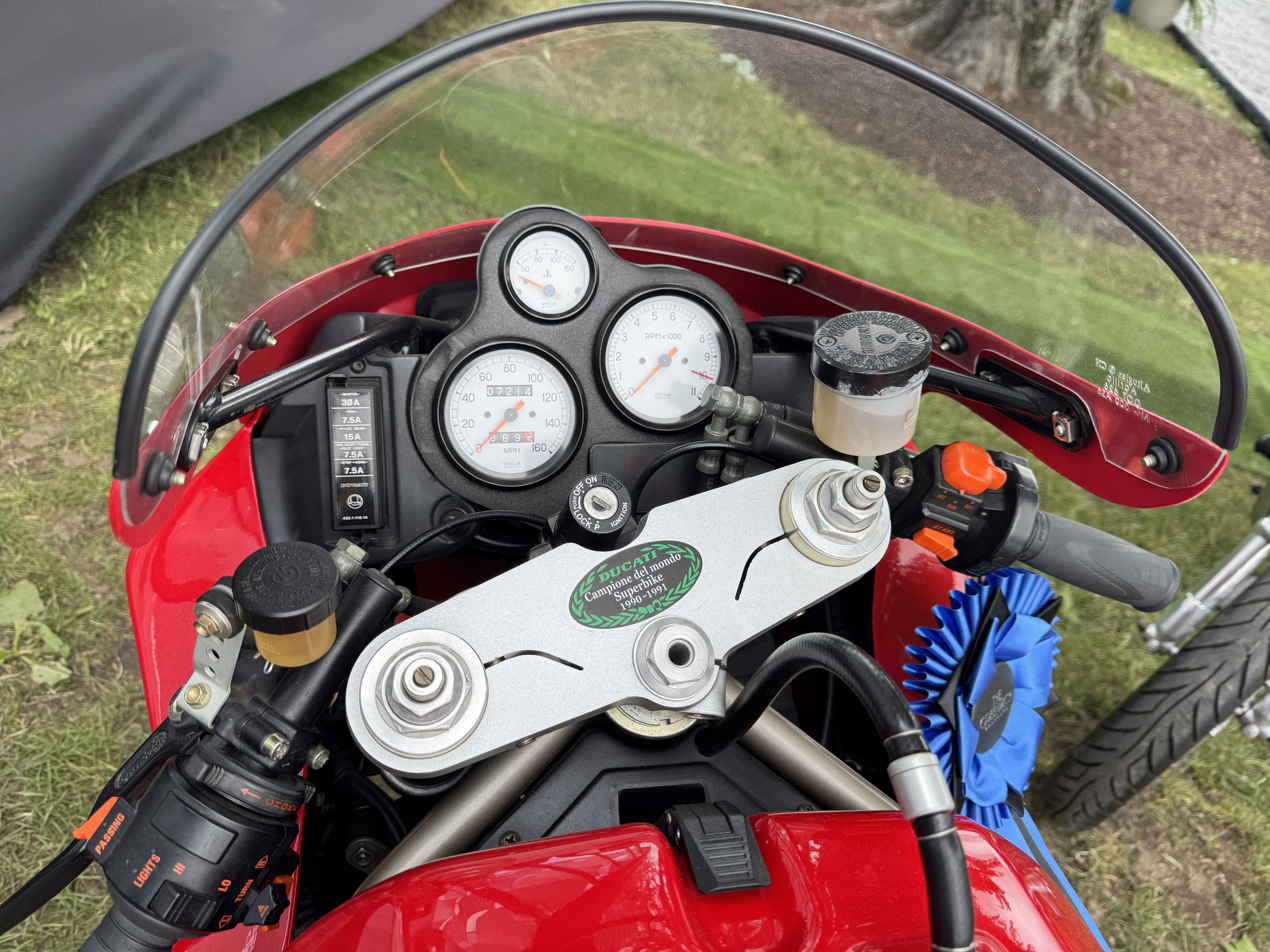
Dashboard (1993 US-market 888 SPO)

== Racing history ==
- 1991 Doug Polen - Ducati 888SBK
- 1992 Doug Polen - Ducati 888SBK
