= Ducati 851 =

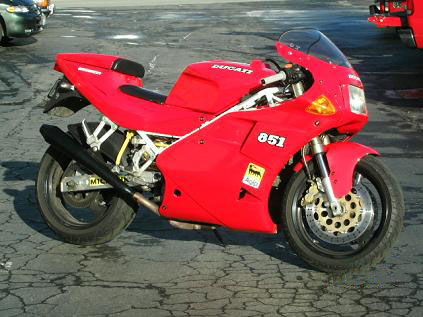
- Manufacturer: Ducati
- Production: 1987–1992
- Successor: Ducati 888
- Class: Sport bike
- Engine: 851 cc (52 cu in), 90° V-twin, fuel injected, 4 valves per cylinder desmodromic, liquid cooled
- Bore / stroke: 92.0 mm × 64.0 mm (3.62 in × 2.52 in)
- Compression ratio: 10.0:1
- Power: 93 hp (69 kW) @ 9,600 rpm
- Transmission: 6 speed, chain drive
- Frame type: Tubular steel trellis frame
- Brakes: Front: Dual disc Rear: Single disc
- Tires: Front: 120/70-17; Rear: 180/55-17
- Weight: ~430 lb (200 kg) (dry); ~460 lb (210 kg) (wet)
- Fuel capacity: 20 litres (5.3 US gal)

The Ducati 851 is a 90° V-twin fully faired sport bike with liquid cooling and four valve heads. It was produced by Ducati between 1987 and 1992, when it was succeeded by the Ducati 888.

== Development ==
The Ducati 851 was the successor to the air-cooled two-valve Ducati 750 F1. Development had lagged with the continued use of two-valve engines, but new investment funded the technological advance that Ducati desperately needed. After buying Ducati, Cagiva invested in the development of another V-twin, but with liquid cooling, and four-valve desmodromic heads. Massimo Bordi had designed a 4V Desmo in 1973 for his thesis at the University of Bologna, and with Cagiva in 1985, saw his updated ideas come into production as the Desmoquattro. Based on the Pantah motor, but with liquid cooling, fuel injection, and desmodromic four valve heads (with an included valve angle of 40°), the 851 made Ducati once again competitive in motorcycle racing.

The original Desmo Quattro was an experimental 748 cc four-valve racer (seen at the Bol d'Or in 1986) and used 750 F1 Pantah crankcases. Bordi collaborated with Cosworth to develop the heads, but in the time they had, they were only able to reduce the included valve angle of the desmodromic engine to 40°, while less than 30° was possible with valve springs. Ducati stuck with the desmodromics. The subsequent 851 road bike had stronger crankcases, while the heads and valves remained the same; designed to fit above the 88 mm bore of a 748 cc version.

The 1987 – 1988 Ducati 851 Tricolor used the signature steel tube trellis frame, adorned with Marvic wheels, Brembo brakes and Marzocchi suspension. That first release was criticised for its handling, with the 16-inch wheels so the wheels were enlarged from a 16-inch to 17-inch wheels. In addition, upgraded Ohlins USD suspension components were fitted front, along with fully floating front Brembo brake rotors.

In 1991, the bore was enlarged when Ducati released the SP Series of limited edition race replicas needed to sell the required number of bikes for the street in order to be homologated for racing, thus creating the Ducati 888. In 1992, three Ducati superbike models were available: the 851 Strada (851 cc), the 888 SP4 (888 cc), and the 888 SP4S (888 cc).

A notable owner of this motorcycle was triple Formula One world champion Ayrton Senna.

== Racing ==
- 1986 Marco Lucchinelli - (Pole Position, Misano GP)
- 1987 Marco Lucchinelli - (Pole Position, SBK)
- 1990 Raymond Roche - SBK (World Champion, SBK)
