= List of places in Arizona (P) =

Places in Arizona

This is a list of cities, towns, unincorporated communities, counties, and other places in the U.S. state of Arizona, which start with the letter P. This list is derived from the Geographic Names Information System, which has numerous errors, so it also includes many ghost towns and historical places that are not necessarily communities or actual populated places. This list also includes information on the number and names of counties in which the place lies, its lower and upper ZIP code bounds, if applicable, its U.S. Geological Survey (USGS) reference number(s) (called the GNIS), class as designated by the USGS, and incorporated community located in (if applicable).

== P ==
Name of place	Number of counties	Principal county	GNIS #(s)	Class	Located in	ZIP code	
Name of place	Number of counties	Principal county	GNIS #(s)	Class	Located in	Lower	Upper
Padre Ranchitos	1	Yuma	2582838	CDP			
Page	1	Coconino	2411352	Civil (city)		86040	
Palomas	1	Yuma	24549	Populated Place			
Palominas	1	Cochise	2582839	CDP		85615	
Palo Verde	1	Maricopa	9142	Populated Place		85343	
Pan Tak	1	Pima	24551	Populated Place		85634	
Pantano	1	Pima		Populated Place			
Papago	1	Maricopa	24552	Populated Place		85257	
Paradise	1	Cochise	9192	Populated Place		85632	
Paradise Valley	1	Maricopa	2413114	Civil (town)		85253	
Parker	1	La Paz	2413116	Civil (town)		85344	
Parker Strip	1	La Paz	2409030	CDP			
Parks	1	Coconino	2409033	CDP		86018	
Parsons Grove	1	Pinal	24553	Populated Place			
Pascua Pueblo Yaqui Reservation	1	Pima	2419049	Civil (Indian reservation)			
Patagonia	1	Santa Cruz	2413118	Civil (town)		85624	
Paulden	1	Yavapai	2409038	CDP		86334	
Payson	1	Gila	2413121	Civil (town)		85541	
Peach Springs	1	Mohave	2409042	CDP		86434	
Pearce	1	Cochise	9290	Populated Place		85625	
Peeples Valley	1	Yavapai	2409049	CDP		86332	
Peoria	2	Maricopa	2411401	Civil (city)		85345	
Peridot	2	Gila	2409055	CDP		85542	
Perkinsville	1	Yavapai	32803	Populated Place		86323	
Perryville	1	Maricopa	9336	Populated Place	Phoenix	85326	
Phoenix	1	Maricopa	2411414	Civil (city)		85001	99
Pia Oik	1	Pima	9387	Populated Place		85634	
Piato Vaya	1	Pima	24559	Populated Place			
Picacho	1	Pinal	2582840	CDP		85241	
Picture Rocks	1	Pima	2409062	CDP			
Pima	1	Graham	2413130	Civil (town)		85543	
Pimaco Two	1	Pima	2582841	CDP			
Pinal	1	Gila	2582842	CDP			
Pine	1	Gila	2409065	CDP		85544	
Pinedale	1	Navajo	2582843	CDP		85934	
Pine Lake	1	Mohave	2582844	CDP			
Pine Springs	1	Apache	9479	Populated Place		86506	
Pinetop Country Club Census Designated Place	1	Navajo	2582845	CDP			
Pinetop-Lakeside	1	Navajo	2413136	Civil (town)		85935	
Pinion Pines Census Designated Place	1	Navajo	2582846	CDP			
Pink Arrow	1	Navajo	24562	Populated Place	Jeddito		
Pinon	1	Navajo	2409075	CDP		86510	
Pipyak	1	Pima	24564	Populated Place			
Pirtleville	1	Cochise	2409076	CDP		85626	
Pisinemo	1	Pima	2409078	CDP		85634	
Pitoikam	1	Pima	24565	Populated Place			
Pivahn-hon-kya-pi	1	Navajo	24558	Populated Place			
Planet	1	La Paz	24566	Populated Place			
Plomosa	1	La Paz	24567	Populated Place			
Point of Pines	1	Graham	9596	Populated Place			
Polacca	1	Navajo	9616	Populated Place	First Mesa	86042	
Pomerene	1	Cochise	9631	Populated Place		85627	
Ponderosa Park	1	Yavapai	33098	Populated Place			
Portal	1	Cochise	9657	Populated Place		85632	
Poston	1	La Paz	2409097	CDP		85371	
Potato Patch	1	Yavapai	33142	Populated Place			
Powell	1	Mohave	24570	Populated Place			
Prescott	1	Yavapai	2411487	Civil (city)		86301	
Prescott Valley	1	Yavapai	2412507	Civil (town)		86312	
Puertocito	1	Pima	33221	Populated Place			
Punkin Center	1	Gila	33230	Populated Place	Tonto Basin	85553	
