= Arrow (disambiguation) =

An arrow is a projectile launched from a bow.

Arrow or Arrows may also refer to:

== Symbols ==
- Arrow (symbol)

== Places ==
=== United States ===
- Arrow, Kentucky, an unincorporated community and former coal town
- Arrow Peak, Colorado
- Arrow Peak (California)
- Arrow Creek (Fresno County, California)
- Arrow Creek (Lake County, Minnesota)
- Arrow Lake (Flathead County, Montana)

=== Elsewhere ===
- Arrow Lake (Western Australia); see List of lakes of Western Australia, A–C
- Arrow Lakes, British Columbia, Canada
- Arrow, Warwickshire, England, a village
- River Arrow, Worcestershire, England
- Lough Arrow, Ireland, a freshwater lake
- Arrow River (New Zealand)
- Arrow Rock (New Zealand), an island in Tasman Bay
- Arrow Rocks, New Zealand, a group of islands
- Arrow Glacier, Mount Kilimanjaro, Tanzania
- River Arrow, Wales

== People ==
- Arrow (surname)
- Arrows Fitz (born 1989), American model, vlogger, television personality, and film producer

== Arts, entertainment, and media ==
=== Fictional entities ===
- Arrow (character), a superhero character, first appearing in 1938
- Arrow, a character from Rudolph the Red-Nosed Reindeer: The Movie
- The Arrow, a fictional location, the first Dharma Initiative station in the television series Lost
- Oliver Queen (Arrowverse), a superhero character, originally known as the Arrow, in the TV series Arrow

=== Music ===
==== Groups and performers ====
- Arrows (Australian band), an indie rock band established 2006
- Arrows (British band), a 1970s Anglo-American glam rock-pop band
- The Arrow (band), a Russian heavy metal band
- The Arrows (Canadian band), a 1980s new wave band
- The Arrows, the backing group of guitarist Davie Allan
- Arrow (musician), stage name of Montserratian calypso and soca musician Alphonsus Cassell (1949–2010)
- Arrow Benjamin, stage name of English singer and songwriter Dean McIntosh (fl. 2015–present)

==== Albums ====
- Arrow (Heartless Bastards album), 2012
- Arrow (Feeder album), 2017
- Arrows (Stonegard album), 2006
- Arrows (The Lonely Forest album), 2011

==== Songs ====
- "Arrow" (Gackt song), 2015
- "Arrow", from the debut album Candlebox by Candlebox
- "Arrows" (song), 2014, by Fences featuring Macklemore and produced by Ryan Lewis
- "Arrows", from the 2011 album Gospel by Fireworks

=== Periodicals ===
- The Arrow (newspaper), an Australian newspaper published between 1896 and 1933
- The Arrow, a British newsletter in the 1930s, edited in 1939 by Frederick Augustus Voigt

=== Radio ===
- Arrow (radio format), playing 1970s classic rock
- 90.7 Arrow Jazz FM, a Dutch jazz radio station
- 94.5 The Arrow, a Florida radio station; see WARO
- 91.9 The Arrow, a New York radio station; see WSHR
- Arrow Classic Rock, a Dutch rock radio station
- Arrow FM (Hastings), UK
- The Arrow (radio station), a former digital radio station in the UK

=== Television ===
- Arrow (TV series), a 2012 television series about the comic book superhero Green Arrow
- Arrows (TV series), the Arrows pop band's 1976–77 weekly ITV TV series
- The Arrow Show, a 1948–49 American variety show
- The Arrow (miniseries), a 1996 Canadian television miniseries
- "Arrow" (Smallville), an episode of the TV series Smallville

=== Other uses in arts, entertainment, and media ===
- Arrow Books, an imprint of Random House
- War of the Arrows, or Arrow: The Ultimate Weapon, a 2011 South Korean film

== Businesses and brands ==
- Arrow (brand), a brand of shirts and collars
- Arrow (liqueur), a brand of alcoholic beverage
- Arrow (motorcycle part manufacturer), Arrow Special Parts, an Italian motorcycle exhaust manufacturer
- Arrow Air, an American airline from 1981 to 2010
- Arrow Aircraft and Motors, an American aircraft manufacturer of the 1920s and 1930s
- Arrow Aircraft Ltd., a British aircraft manufacturer of the 1930s
- Arrow Comics, an American independent publisher of black-and-white comics
- Arrow Dynamics, an American roller coaster manufacturer from 1943 to 2002
- Arrow Electronics, an American electronics company founded in 1935
- Arrow Films, an independent British film distributor
- Arrow Film Corporation, an American silent film studio
- Arrow Global, a European fund manager based in Manchester
- Arrow SNC, an Italian aircraft engine manufacturer
- Arrow Hotel, Broken Bow, Nebraska, US
- Arrow Theatre, Middle Park, Victoria, Australia

== Computing ==
- Arrow (computer science), a more general interface to computation than monads
- Arrows (Unicode block), containing line, curve, and semicircle symbols terminating in barbs or arrows
- Apache Arrow, a framework for data analytics applications

== Mathematics ==
- Arrow, the lower limit topology on the real line
- Morphism, also called arrow, a concept in category theory

== Military ==
- HMS Arrow, seven ships of the British Royal Navy
- Arrow-class gunvessel, a Royal Navy class built in 1854
- HMAS Arrow (P 88), a Royal Australian Navy patrol boat
- CSS Arrow, a Confederate States Navy gunboat in the American Civil War
- Avro Canada CF-105 Arrow, a prototype Canadian supersonic fighter-interceptor cancelled in 1959
- Dornier Do 335 Pfeil (Arrow), an experimental Nazi heavy fighter
- Arrow (missile family), an Israeli anti-ballistic missile system
- Arrow (Russian missile), an air-to-air missile
- Operation Arrow, a 1988 mujahideen offensive against the army of the Republic of Afghanistan
- Arrow Division (1945–1948), the military division of the North Sumatra branch of the Indonesian Christian Party during the Indonesian National Revolution

== Transportation ==
=== Aircraft ===
- Aeronca Arrow, a 1947 monoplane of which only a prototype was made
- Auster Arrow, a 1940s British monoplane
- FreeX Arrow, a German paraglider design
- Hawk Arrow, an ultralight aircraft
- Piper Arrow, a family of variants of the Piper PA-28 Cherokee light aircraft
- Spartan Arrow, a 1930s British biplane
- Thorp Arrow, an American light aircraft design

=== Automobiles and motorcycles ===
- Arrow, a car manufactured by the Pierce-Arrow Motor Car Company in 1903
- Whitmore Arrow, a 1914 cyclecar from Detroit, Michigan
- Rootes Arrow, a range of cars from the British Rootes Group from 1967 to 1976, commonest being the Hillman Hunter
- Chrysler Arrow and Chrysler Arrow Cross, compact crossover SUVs
- Mitsubishi Lancer (A70), a car also marketed as the Dodge Arrow
- Plymouth Arrow, a Chrysler import (1976–1980)
- Project Arrow, a Canadian electric vehicle project
- Apollo Arrow, a German sports car concept
- Ariel Arrow, a British motorcycle first produced in 1959

=== Rail ===
- Amtrak Arrow Reservation System, used by Amtrak employees for passenger reservations
- Arrow (rail service), a commuter rail service in San Bernardino County, California, US
- Arrow (Milwaukee Road train), an American Midwestern route that ran until the mid-1960s
- Powhatan Arrow or Arrow for short, a named flagship passenger train of the Norfolk and Western Railway
- Arrow (railcar), a railroad car of the Pennsylvania Railroad
- IE 2600 Class, also known as Arrow, a railcar of Irish Rail
- IE 2700 Class, also known as Arrows, a railroad car of Iarnród Éireann

=== Ships ===
- Arrow (barque), built in 1902 for the Anglo-American Oil Co Ltd.
- Arrow-class oil tanker, consisting of 12 steam-powered oil tankers constructed for the Standard Oil Company of New York between 1916 and 1921
- MS Arrow, a Seatruck Ferries ship
- SS Arrow, an oil built in 1948, originally named Olympic Games
- Arrow, a New Zealand Company sailing ship, the first to enter Nelson Harbour, New Zealand
- Arrow, a Chinese-owned lorcha, namesake of the Arrow War, better known as the Second Opium War

=== Rockets ===
- "Arrow" or Strela (rocket), a Russian orbital launch rocket

== Other uses ==
- Arrow Unit, a plainclothes unit of the Palestinian Civil Police Force
- Arrows Grand Prix International, a former Formula One racing team
- Arrow declaration, in UK patent litigation
- ARROW waveguide, an anti-resonant reflecting optical waveguide

== See also ==
- Order of the Arrow, an honor society of Scouting America
- Arrow's impossibility theorem, on voting systems
- Arrow Sport, a sporting biplane aircraft built in the US in the 1920s and 1930s
- Arrowtown, New Zealand
- Black Arrow (disambiguation)
- Blue Arrow (disambiguation)
- Golden Arrow (disambiguation)
- Green Arrow (disambiguation)
- Pink Arrow (disambiguation)
- Red Arrow (disambiguation)
- River Arrow (disambiguation)
- Silver Arrow (disambiguation)
- White Arrow (disambiguation)
- Yellow Arrow (disambiguation)
