= Golden Arrow =

Golden Arrow or Golden Arrows may refer to:

== Film ==
- Golden Arrow (1935 film), Italian drama
- The Golden Arrow (1936 film), American comedy
- Golden Arrow (1949 film), British comedy
- The Golden Arrow (1962 film), Italian peplum genre adventure

== Sports ==
- Golden Arrow (seaplane), 1929 Schneider Trophy racing aircraft; official name Gloster VI
- Golden Arrows, South African football club founded 1943; full name Lamontville Golden Arrows F.C.

== Transportation ==
- Golden Arrow Bus Services, South African commuter bus operator in Cape Town; founded 1861
- Golden Arrow (train), English luxury train which connected London and Dover between 1926 and 1972
- Golden Arrow (Pennsylvania Railroad train), American passenger service between 1929 and 1946
- Golden Arrow (car), British land speed record racer driven in 1929 by Henry Segrave
- Abaris Golden Arrow, home-built aircraft design by Abaris Aircraft planned in 1990s

== Other ==
- The Golden Arrow prayer, prayer of Reparation revealed to French Carmelite nun in 1844
- "Golden Arrow" (song), 1909 American popular song by Egbert Van Alstyne
- The Golden Arrow (novel), 1916 romance by English romantic novelist Mary Webb
- Golden Arrow (Scouting), peace symbol presented by Baden-Powell during 3rd World Scout Jamboree in 1929
- Golden Arrow (comics), Fawcett Comics character in print from 1940 to 1953
- Golden Arrow Award, Japanese accolade presented by Magazine Publishers Association between 1964 and 2008
- Golden Arrow (horse)

== See also ==
- Arrow (disambiguation)
- Black Arrow (disambiguation)
- Blue Arrow (disambiguation)
- Green Arrow (disambiguation)
- Pink Arrow (disambiguation)
- Red Arrow (disambiguation)
- Silver Arrow (disambiguation)
- White Arrow (disambiguation)
- Yellow Arrow (disambiguation)
