= Arrow Creek =

Arrow Creek may refer to:

Streams

- Arrow Creek (Fresno County, California)
- Arrow Creek (Fergus County, Montana)

Other

- Arrow Creek, Montana, an unincorporated community
- Battle of Arrow Creek (1861)

== See also ==
- Arrow (disambiguation)
- Arrow River (disambiguation)
- River Arrow (disambiguation)
