= Silberpfeil =

Silberpfeil is a German word translating as silver arrow.

It can refer to the following:

== Vehicles ==
- the Silver Arrows racecars by Mercedes-Benz and Auto Union
- the TW 2000 tramcars in use on the Hanover Stadtbahn
- the Type U cars of the Vienna U-Bahn

== Comics ==
- Zilverpijl, a Belgian comic book series, known in Germany as Silberpfeil

== See also ==
- Silver Arrow (disambiguation)
