= Arrow Rock =

Arrow Rock may refer to:

- Arrow Rock (New Zealand), an island in Tasman Bay
- Arrow Rocks, New Zealand
- Arrow Rock, Missouri, U.S., a village
  - Arrow Rock Historic District, a National Historic Landmark district in Arrow Rock, Missouri
- Arrow Rock State Park, In Lamine Township, Cooper County, Missouri, U.S.
- Arrow Rock Festival, an annual music festival in the Netherlands
