= Silver Arrow =

Silver Arrow, Silver Arrows or The Silver Arrow may refer to:

- The Pierce Silver Arrow, a luxury car introduced in 1933
- Frecciargento (Italian for SilverArrow), the brand name for 200-250 km/h Italian high speed trains
- Silver Arrow (rail-air service), a former intermodal passenger transport service between London and Paris
- Silverpilen (The Silver Arrow) – a nickname for the Swedish SL C5 metro train
- Silverpilen (The Silver Arrow) – a ghost train roaming the Stockhilm metro, see The Silver Train of Stockholm
- Silver Arrow, a division of Elbit Systems that builds unmanned aerial vehicles
- Zilverpijl (Silver arrow), Belgian comic book series about the American Old West
- Silver Arrow, a limited dealer edition of the Saab 900
- Silver Arrows, nickname given by the press to Germany's dominant Mercedes-Benz and Auto Union Grand Prix motor racing cars between 1934 and 1939

== See also ==
- Arrow (disambiguation)
- Black Arrow (disambiguation)
- Blue Arrow (disambiguation)
- Golden Arrow (disambiguation)
- Green Arrow (disambiguation)
- Pink Arrow (disambiguation)
- Red Arrow (disambiguation)
- White Arrow (disambiguation)
- Yellow Arrow (disambiguation)
- Silverpilen (disambiguation) (Swedish for the Silver arrow)
