= 2014 Aragon Superbike World Championship round =

(Spain) 2014 Aragon Superbike World Championship round
Round details
- Round 2 of 13 rounds in the 2014 Superbike World Championship. and Round 2 of 12 rounds in the 2014 Supersport World Championship.
- Date: 13 April, 2014
- Location: MotorLand Aragón
- Course: Permanent racing facility 5.344 km (3.321 mi)

Superbike World Championship
Pole position
(United Kingdom) Tom Sykes
1:56.479
| Fastest lap race 1 | Fastest lap race 2 |
| (United Kingdom) Tom Sykes | (United Kingdom) Chaz Davies |
| 1:57.664 | 1:57.982 |

Supersport World Championship
Pole position
(United Kingdom) Kev Coghlan
2:01.662
Fastest lap
(France) Jules Cluzel
2:01.708

The 2014 Aragon Superbike World Championship round was the second round of the 2014 Superbike World Championship. It took place over the weekend of 11–13 April 2014 at the MotorLand Aragón near Alcañiz, Spain.

== Superbike ==
=== Race 1 classification ===
| Pos | No. | Rider | Bike | Laps | Time | Grid | Points |
|---|---|---|---|---|---|---|---|
| 1 | 1 | (United Kingdom) Tom Sykes | Kawasaki ZX-10R | 17 | 33:38.583 | 1 | 25 |
| 2 | 76 | (France) Loris Baz | Kawasaki ZX-10R | 17 | +4.725 | 2 | 20 |
| 3 | 65 | (United Kingdom) Jonathan Rea | Honda CBR1000RR | 17 | +8.418 | 5 | 16 |
| 4 | 7 | (United Kingdom) Chaz Davies | Ducati 1199 Panigale R | 17 | +15.715 | 6 | 13 |
| 5 | 58 | (Republic of Ireland) Eugene Laverty | Suzuki GSX-R1000 | 17 | +19.305 | 8 | 11 |
| 6 | 50 | (France) Sylvain Guintoli | Aprilia RSV4 Factory | 17 | +21.998 | 3 | 10 |
| 7 | 24 | (Spain) Toni Elías | Aprilia RSV4 Factory | 17 | +24.018 | 10 | 9 |
| 8 | 34 | (Italy) Davide Giugliano | Ducati 1199 Panigale R | 17 | +27.894 | 4 | 8 |
| 9 | 91 | (United Kingdom) Leon Haslam | Honda CBR1000RR | 17 | +29.077 | 12 | 7 |
| 10 | 22 | (United Kingdom) Alex Lowes | Suzuki GSX-R1000 | 17 | +29.863 | 9 | 6 |
| 11 | 33 | (Italy) Marco Melandri | Aprilia RSV4 Factory | 17 | +34.820 | 7 | 5 |
| 12 | 19 | (United Kingdom) Leon Camier | BMW S1000RR EVO | 17 | +35.255 | 11 | 4 |
| N/A^{1} | 86 | (Italy) Ayrton Badovini | Bimota BB3 EVO | 17 | +43.934 | 15 | |
| 13 | 44 | (Spain) David Salom | Kawasaki ZX-10R EVO | 17 | +43.975 | 14 | 3 |
| 14 | 11 | (France) Jérémy Guarnoni | Kawasaki ZX-10R EVO | 17 | +46.721 | 20 | 2 |
| 15 | 32 | (South Africa) Sheridan Morais | Kawasaki ZX-10R EVO | 17 | +56.619 | 17 | 1 |
| N/A^{1} | 2 | (United Kingdom) Christian Iddon | Bimota BB3 EVO | 17 | +58.222 | 18 | |
| 16 | 23 | (Italy) Luca Scassa | Kawasaki ZX-10R EVO | 17 | +1:16.469 | 22 | |
| 17 | 20 | (United States) Aaron Yates | EBR 1190 RX | 17 | +1:35.047 | 25 | |
| 18 | 10 | (Hungary) Imre Tóth | BMW S1000RR | 17 | +1:48.427 | 24 | |
| 19 | 21 | (Italy) Alessandro Andreozzi | Kawasaki ZX-10R EVO | 17 | +1:51.222 | 23 | |
| 20 | 56 | (Hungary) Péter Sebestyén | BMW S1000RR EVO | 17 | +2:01.152 | 27 | |
| Ret | 84 | (Italy) Michel Fabrizio | Kawasaki ZX-10R EVO | 9 | Retirement | 19 | |
| Ret | 59 | (Italy) Niccolò Canepa | Ducati 1199 Panigale R EVO | 4 | Technical problem | 13 | |
| Ret | 99 | (United States) Geoff May | EBR 1190 RX | 3 | Technical problem | 26 | |
| Ret | 71 | (Italy) Claudio Corti | MV Agusta F4 RR | 1 | Retirement | 16 | |
| Ret | 9 | (France) Fabien Foret | Kawasaki ZX-10R EVO | 0 | Technical problem | 21 | |
OFFICIAL SUPERBIKE RACE 1 REPORT

Notes:

- ^1 — Bimota entries were not eligible to score points and were removed from the race results.

=== Race 2 classification ===
| Pos | No. | Rider | Bike | Laps | Time | Grid | Points |
|---|---|---|---|---|---|---|---|
| 1 | 1 | (United Kingdom) Tom Sykes | Kawasaki ZX-10R | 17 | 33:37.223 | 1 | 25 |
| 2 | 76 | (France) Loris Baz | Kawasaki ZX-10R | 17 | +0.338 | 2 | 20 |
| 3 | 33 | (Italy) Marco Melandri | Aprilia RSV4 Factory | 17 | +0.470 | 7 | 16 |
| 4 | 50 | (France) Sylvain Guintoli | Aprilia RSV4 Factory | 17 | +5.429 | 3 | 13 |
| 5 | 65 | (United Kingdom) Jonathan Rea | Honda CBR1000RR | 17 | +8.861 | 5 | 11 |
| 6 | 58 | (Republic of Ireland) Eugene Laverty | Suzuki GSX-R1000 | 17 | +15.986 | 8 | 10 |
| 7 | 34 | (Italy) Davide Giugliano | Ducati 1199 Panigale R | 17 | +18.206 | 4 | 9 |
| 8 | 91 | (United Kingdom) Leon Haslam | Honda CBR1000RR | 17 | +25.513 | 12 | 8 |
| 9 | 24 | (Spain) Toni Elías | Aprilia RSV4 Factory | 17 | +25.823 | 10 | 7 |
| 10 | 44 | (Spain) David Salom | Kawasaki ZX-10R EVO | 17 | +38.949 | 14 | 6 |
| 11 | 59 | (Italy) Niccolò Canepa | Ducati 1199 Panigale R EVO | 17 | +39.413 | 13 | 5 |
| N/A^{1} | 86 | (Italy) Ayrton Badovini | Bimota BB3 EVO | 17 | +40.915 | 15 | |
| 12 | 19 | (United Kingdom) Leon Camier | BMW S1000RR EVO | 17 | +41.486 | 11 | 4 |
| 13 | 32 | (South Africa) Sheridan Morais | Kawasaki ZX-10R EVO | 17 | +1:02.587 | 17 | 3 |
| 14 | 23 | (Italy) Luca Scassa | Kawasaki ZX-10R EVO | 17 | +1:09.720 | 22 | 2 |
| 15 | 9 | (France) Fabien Foret | Kawasaki ZX-10R EVO | 17 | +1:14.046 | 21 | 1 |
| 16 | 21 | (Italy) Alessandro Andreozzi | Kawasaki ZX-10R EVO | 17 | +1:14.233 | 23 | |
| 17 | 10 | (Hungary) Imre Tóth | BMW S1000RR | 17 | +1:37.781 | 24 | |
| 18 | 56 | (Hungary) Péter Sebestyén | BMW S1000RR EVO | 17 | +1:54.547 | 27 | |
| 19 | 20 | (United States) Aaron Yates | EBR 1190 RX | 17 | +1:55.195 | 25 | |
| 20 | 99 | (United States) Geoff May | EBR 1190 RX | 17 | +1:57.166 | 26 | |
| Ret | 84 | (Italy) Michel Fabrizio | Kawasaki ZX-10R EVO | 12 | Retirement | 19 | |
| N/A^{1} | 2 | (United Kingdom) Christian Iddon | Bimota BB3 EVO | 10 | Technical problem | 18 | |
| Ret | 11 | (France) Jérémy Guarnoni | Kawasaki ZX-10R EVO | 9 | Accident | 20 | |
| Ret | 71 | (Italy) Claudio Corti | MV Agusta F4 RR | 5 | Accident | 16 | |
| Ret | 7 | (United Kingdom) Chaz Davies | Ducati 1199 Panigale R | 3 | Accident | 6 | |
| Ret | 22 | (United Kingdom) Alex Lowes | Suzuki GSX-R1000 | 1 | Accident | 9 | |
OFFICIAL SUPERBIKE RACE 2 REPORT

Notes:

- ^1 — Bimota entries were not eligible to score points and were removed from the race results.

== Supersport ==
=== Race classification ===
| Pos | No. | Rider | Bike | Laps | Time | Grid | Points |
|---|---|---|---|---|---|---|---|
| 1 | 54 | (Turkey) Kenan Sofuoğlu | Kawasaki ZX-6R | 15 | 30:43.276 | 6 | 25 |
| 2 | 60 | (Netherlands) Michael van der Mark | Honda CBR600RR | 15 | +0.869 | 5 | 20 |
| 3 | 21 | (France) Florian Marino | Kawasaki ZX-6R | 15 | +9.091 | 4 | 16 |
| 4 | 26 | (Italy) Lorenzo Zanetti | Honda CBR600RR | 15 | +10.475 | 7 | 13 |
| 5 | 88 | (United Kingdom) Kev Coghlan | Yamaha YZF-R6 | 15 | +15.194 | 1 | 11 |
| 6 | 35 | (Italy) Raffaele De Rosa | Honda CBR600RR | 15 | +18.579 | 12 | 10 |
| 7 | 5 | (Italy) Roberto Tamburini | Kawasaki ZX-6R | 15 | +19.059 | 11 | 9 |
| 8 | 65 | (Russia) Vladimir Leonov | MV Agusta F3 675 | 15 | +19.666 | 8 | 8 |
| 9 | 11 | (Italy) Christian Gamarino | Kawasaki ZX-6R | 15 | +19.846 | 14 | 7 |
| 10 | 14 | (Thailand) Ratthapark Wilairot | Honda CBR600RR | 15 | +20.077 | 10 | 6 |
| 11 | 4 | (Republic of Ireland) Jack Kennedy | Honda CBR600RR | 15 | +24.569 | 13 | 5 |
| 12 | 44 | (Italy) Roberto Rolfo | Kawasaki ZX-6R | 15 | +25.187 | 19 | 4 |
| 13 | 6 | (Switzerland) Dominic Schmitter | Yamaha YZF-R6 | 15 | +25.535 | 17 | 3 |
| 14 | 99 | (United States) Patrick Jacobsen | Kawasaki ZX-6R | 15 | +28.843 | 2 | 2 |
| 15 | 61 | (Italy) Fabio Menghi | Yamaha YZF-R6 | 15 | +28.904 | 16 | 1 |
| 16 | 24 | (Italy) Marco Bussolotti | Honda CBR600RR | 15 | +33.148 | 18 | |
| 17 | 9 | (Netherlands) Tony Coveña | Kawasaki ZX-6R | 15 | +43.243 | 22 | |
| 18 | 89 | (United Kingdom) Fraser Rogers | Honda CBR600RR | 15 | +56.196 | 23 | |
| 19 | 161 | (Russia) Alexey Ivanov | Yamaha YZF-R6 | 15 | +56.460 | 24 | |
| 20 | 7 | (Spain) Nacho Calero | Honda CBR600RR | 15 | +1:11.373 | 20 | |
| Ret | 16 | (France) Jules Cluzel | MV Agusta F3 675 | 11 | Accident | 3 | |
| Ret | 10 | (Italy) Alessandro Nocco | Honda CBR600RR | 9 | Retirement | 21 | |
| Ret | 84 | (Italy) Riccardo Russo | Honda CBR600RR | 6 | Retirement | 9 | |
| Ret | 19 | (Germany) Kevin Wahr | Yamaha YZF-R6 | 4 | Technical problem | 15 | |
OFFICIAL SUPERSPORT REPORT

== Superstock ==
=== STK1000 race classification ===
| Pos | No. | Rider | Bike | Laps | Time | Grid | Points |
|---|---|---|---|---|---|---|---|
| 1 | 36 | (Argentina) Leandro Mercado | Ducati 1199 Panigale R | 13 | 26:37.837 | 1 | 25 |
| 2 | 32 | (Italy) Lorenzo Savadori | Kawasaki ZX-10R | 13 | +5.218 | 4 | 20 |
| 3 | 11 | (United Kingdom) Kyle Smith | Honda CBR1000RR | 13 | +8.818 | 7 | 16 |
| 4 | 71 | (Sweden) Christoffer Bergman | Kawasaki ZX-10R | 13 | +17.974 | 3 | 13 |
| 5 | 41 | (Italy) Federico D'Annunzio | BMW S1000RR | 13 | +23.182 | 8 | 11 |
| 6 | 94 | (France) Mathieu Lussiana | Kawasaki ZX-10R | 13 | +23.714 | 6 | 10 |
| 7 | 15 | (Italy) Simone Grotzkyj | Kawasaki ZX-10R | 13 | +25.882 | 12 | 9 |
| 8 | 169 | (South Africa) David McFadden | Kawasaki ZX-10R | 13 | +28.777 | 14 | 8 |
| 9 | 18 | (Netherlands) Kevin Valk | Kawasaki ZX-10R | 13 | +30.259 | 13 | 7 |
| 10 | 98 | (France) Romain Lanusse | Kawasaki ZX-10R | 13 | +30.790 | 24 | 6 |
| 11 | 4 | (United States) Joshua Day | Honda CBR1000RR | 13 | +35.064 | 9 | 5 |
| 12 | 16 | (Italy) Remo Castellarin | BMW S1000RR HP4 | 13 | +37.456 | 16 | 4 |
| 13 | 39 | (France) Randy Pagaud | Kawasaki ZX-10R | 13 | +38.300 | 18 | 3 |
| 14 | 3 | (Switzerland) Sébastien Suchet | Kawasaki ZX-10R | 13 | +40.403 | 20 | 2 |
| 15 | 59 | (Denmark) Alex Schacht | Ducati 1199 Panigale R | 13 | +43.670 | 17 | 1 |
| 16 | 90 | (Spain) Javier Alviz | Kawasaki ZX-10R | 13 | +57.952 | 21 | |
| 17 | 82 | (Czech Republic) Karel Pešek | Ducati 1199 Panigale R | 13 | +1:00.063 | 22 | |
| 18 | 12 | (Switzerland) Jonathan Crea | Kawasaki ZX-10R | 13 | +1:09.284 | 23 | |
| 19 | 27 | (Italy) Riccardo Cecchini | BMW S1000RR | 11 | +2 lap | 11 | |
| Ret | 5 | (Romania) Robert Mureșan | BMW S1000RR | 12 | Accident | 15 | |
| Ret | 93 | (Italy) Alberto Butti | Kawasaki ZX-10R | 11 | Retirement | 25 | |
| Ret | 43 | (Italy) Fabio Massei | Ducati 1199 Panigale R | 3 | Accident | 5 | |
| Ret | 24 | (France) Stéphane Egea | Kawasaki ZX-10R | 2 | Retirement | 19 | |
| Ret | 34 | (Hungary) Balázs Németh | Kawasaki ZX-10R | 0 | Accident | 10 | |
| Ret | 7 | (Switzerland) Jérémy Ayer | Kawasaki ZX-10R | 0 | Accident | 26 | |
| DSQ | 69 | (Czech Republic) Ondřej Ježek | Ducati 1199 Panigale R | 12 | Disqualified | 2 | |
| DNS | 28 | (Germany) Marc Moser | Ducati 1199 Panigale R | | Did not start | | |
OFFICIAL SUPERSTOCK 1000 RACE REPORT
