= Green Arrow (disambiguation) =

Green Arrow is a DC Comics superhero character

Green Arrow or Green Arrows may also refer to:

- Green Arrow (Connor Hawke), a DC Comics superhero character, son of the first Green Arrow
- Oliver Queen (Arrowverse), a character in the Arrowverse television and web series franchise whose alter ego is Green Arrow
- "Green Arrow" (Arrow episode), an episode of the television series Arrow
- DC Showcase: Green Arrow, a 2010 short animated film
- LNER Class V2 4771 Green Arrow, a steam locomotive
- Green Arrow: Year One, a 2007 DC Comics limited series
- Green Arrow: The Longbow Hunters, a 1987 DC Comics comic book miniseries
- Green Arrows, an Italian hardcore punk band
- The Green Arrows, a Zimbabwean band

== See also ==
- Arrow (disambiguation)
- Black Arrow (disambiguation)
- Blue Arrow (disambiguation)
- Golden Arrow (disambiguation)
- Pink Arrow (disambiguation)
- Red Arrow (disambiguation)
- Silver Arrow (disambiguation)
- White Arrow (disambiguation)
- Yellow Arrow (disambiguation)
