= Arrow River =

Arrow River may refer to:

- Arrow River (New Zealand), a short river
- Arrow River, Manitoba, unincorporated settlement

== See also ==
- River Arrow (disambiguation)
- Arrow (disambiguation)
- Arrow Creek (disambiguation)
