= Red Arrow =

Red Arrow or Red Arrows may refer to:

== Biology ==
- A species of dragonfly, Rhodothemis lieftincki
- The red arrow crab Stenorhynchus yangi

== Business ==
- Red Arrow Diner, a diner in the U.S. state of New Hampshire
- Red Arrow Entertainment Group, the content, production, and distribution division of ProSiebenSat.1 Media
- Red Arrow Products Company LLC, a food flavor manufacturer operating as a subsidiary of Kerry Group
- Red Arrow TV rental, former Granada plc subsidiary

== Entertainment ==
- Formerly the superhero guise of Roy Harper, a DC Comics character, formerly known as Speedy and Arsenal, before going back to using the code name Arsenal following the death of his daughter
- Emiko Queen, also known as Red Arrow, half-sister of the DC Comics superhero Green Arrow (Oliver Queen)
- Briefly suggested as a code name for herself by the Arrowverse character Thea Queen
- Red Arrow (Middle-earth), a summoning device in Tolkien's fictional universe
- Red Arrow, an aircraft featured in the Thunderbirds episode "Edge of Impact"
- Red Arrow, Black Shield, adventure module for D & D

== Military ==
- Red Arrows, the aerobatics display team of the Royal Air Force of the UK.
- “Red Arrow Division“, nickname and insignia of the 32nd Infantry Division (United States), active 1917 – 1919 and 1940 – 1946
- Common name of Chinese anti-tank missiles, Hongjian, 红箭, abbreviated as HJ, includes

- HJ-8
- HJ-9
- HJ-10
- HJ-12

== Sport ==
- Al-Mussanah Club “Red Arrows“, Omani sports club
- Red Arrows F.C., a Zambian soccer club
- "Red Arrow", a finishing maneuver popularized by the English professional wrestler Neville (currently using the stage name Pac)

== Transportation ==
- Red Arrow (PRR train), a train on the Pennsylvania Railroad between Detroit and New York City
- Red Arrow (Russian train), a Russian express sleeper train running between Moscow and Saint Petersburg
- Red Arrow (Swiss train), a class of Swiss railcars built in the 1930s
- Red Arrow (London Buses), a family of express bus services in central London, UK
- Red Arrow Motorcoach, a long-distance bus company in the Canadian provinces of Alberta and Ontario, part of Pacific Western
- Red Arrow Lines, a defunct trolley service in the American state of Pennsylvania
- Frecciarossa (Italian for RedArrow), the brand name for 300-350 km/h Italian high speed trains
- Red Arrow, a bus service operated by Trentbarton between Nottingham and Derby in the UK
- Red Arrows, an express bus service operated by Go North East between Wearside and Newcastle in the UK
- Red Arrow, an express train of Seibu Railway, Japan
- Red arrow, a type of traffic light
- Red Arrow Highway, a portion of U.S. Route 12 in Michigan named for the 32nd Infantry Division
- Red Arrow, a limited dealer edition of the Saab 900

== Other ==
- Lowell high school, a public secondary school in Lowell, Michigan, USA, nicknamed "Red Arrows" in honor of the 32nd Red Arrow Infantry Division
- Red Arrows Sky Force, a simulated plane ride at the Pleasure Beach, Blackpool, UK
- The “Red Arrow Award“ of the Boy Scouts' Order of the Arrow
- “Red Tipped Arrow“ (Ihbudah Hishi), Native American politician also known as Tex G. Hall
- Red Arrow Park, a city park in Marinette, Wisconsin, US

== See also ==
- Arrow (disambiguation)
- Black Arrow (disambiguation)
- Blue Arrow (disambiguation)
- Golden Arrow (disambiguation)
- Green Arrow (disambiguation)
- Pink Arrow (disambiguation)
- Silver Arrow (disambiguation)
- White Arrow (disambiguation)
- Yellow Arrow (disambiguation)
