= Pink Arrow =

Pink Arrow or Pink Arrows may refer to:

- Pink Arrow, Arizona, a town in Navajo County, Arizona
- Pink Arrow, a super hero character in the adult comic series SuperFuckers
- Pink Arrow Pride, a charitable project to support breast cancer victims in Lowell, Michigan
  - Pink Arrows, the nickname of the Lowell High School (Lowell, Michigan) football team during Pink Arrow Pride games (Pink Arrow games)

== See also ==
- Arrow (disambiguation)
- Black Arrow (disambiguation)
- Blue Arrow (disambiguation)
- Golden Arrow (disambiguation)
- Green Arrow (disambiguation)
- Red Arrow (disambiguation)
- Silver Arrow (disambiguation)
- White Arrow (disambiguation)
- Yellow Arrow (disambiguation)
