= The Lonely Forest =

American indie rock band

- Origin: Anacortes, Washington, US
- Genres: Rock, alternative rock, indie rock
- Years active: 2005–2014
- Labels: Burning Building, Trans, Chop Shop
- Members: John Van Deusen; Eric Sturgeon; Braydn Krueger; Tony Ruland

The Lonely Forest was an American indie rock band from Anacortes, Washington with two EPs and four studio albums. In 2011, lead singer John Van Deusen was selected for Seattle Weekly’s best male vocalist award, and the band appeared on Jimmy Kimmel Live!. The group went on indefinite hiatus in 2014.

== History ==
The Lonely Forest was formed in 2005 and won EMP's under-21 Sound Off! competition. The band released the album Arrows in 2011 on ILG, Warner Music Group’s independent label.

The band played at Bonnaroo (2012), Sasquatch (2010, 2014), and Bumbershoot (2006, 2009, 2011, 2014). Their videos debuted on MTV, and they received support from the Seattle radio station KEXP. In August 2011 the song "We Sing in Time" was in the Number 1 spot for the People's Choice Countdown.

Regicide is the band's debut EP and was self-released in September 2006. It was produced by Jack Endino.

Nuclear Winter, the band's first full-length album, was released in August 2007 and produced by Sam Winston and the band.

We Sing The Body Electric! was released in April 2009 through Burning Building Recordings. For this album the band had abandoned the experimental rhetoric of their previous releases and fully embraced their knack for writing realized pop songs.

The Lonely Forest is a self-titled EP, produced and engineered by Chris Walla.

Arrows was released in March 2011. The song “We Sing In Time” won NPR’s 2011 “Best New Artist” award. The song "Woe is me... I Am Ruined" appeared on The Vampire Diaries TV show.

Adding Up the Wasted Hours is the band's fourth album. It was released on Trans/Chop Shop Records in October 2013.

In May 2014, the band announced that they would be taking an indefinite hiatus. John Van Deusen has continued songwriting with his solo career, and has also started the punk rock band Buffet, along with Krueger.
