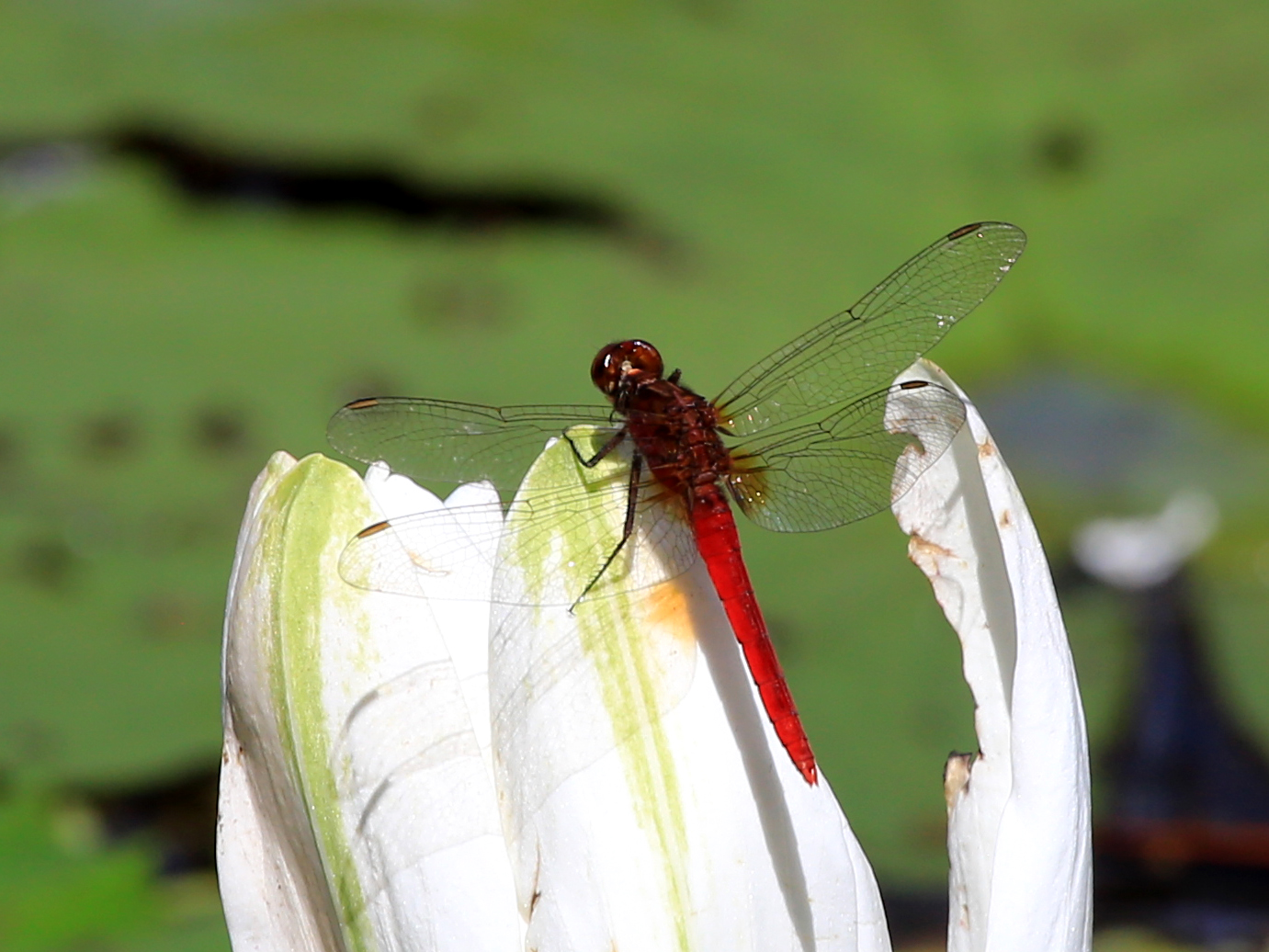
- Rhodothemis lieftincki

Scientific classification
- Kingdom: Animalia
- Phylum: Arthropoda
- Clade: Pancrustacea
- Class: Insecta
- Order: Odonata
- Infraorder: Anisoptera
- Family: Libellulidae
- Subfamily: Sympetrinae
- Genus: Rhodothemis; Ris, 1909

Type species
- Rhodothemis rufa

= Rhodothemis =

Genus of dragonflies

Rhodothemis is a genus of dragonflies in the family Libellulidae. The species occur from India, through Southeast Asia to Australia.

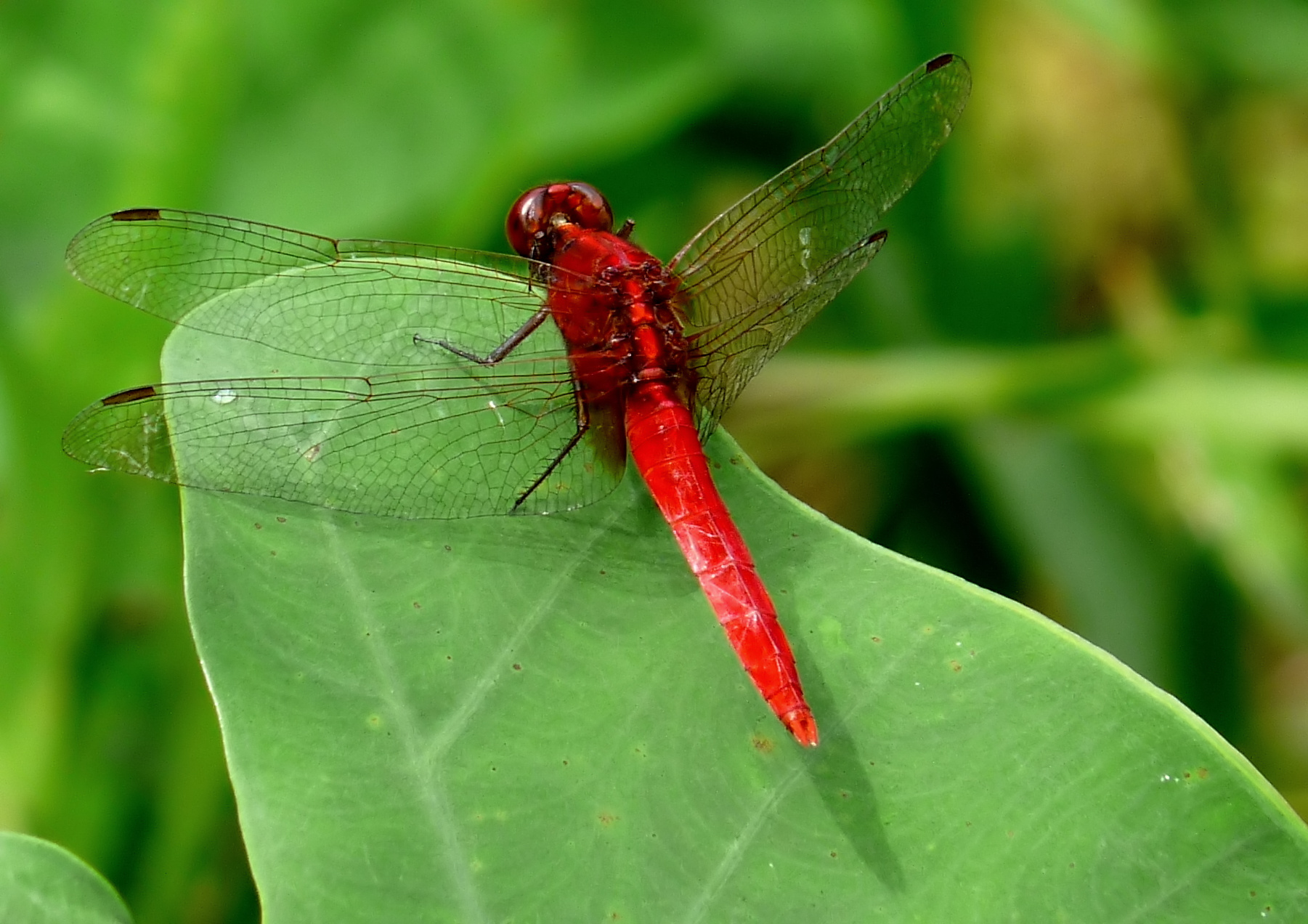
Rhodothemis rufa, male

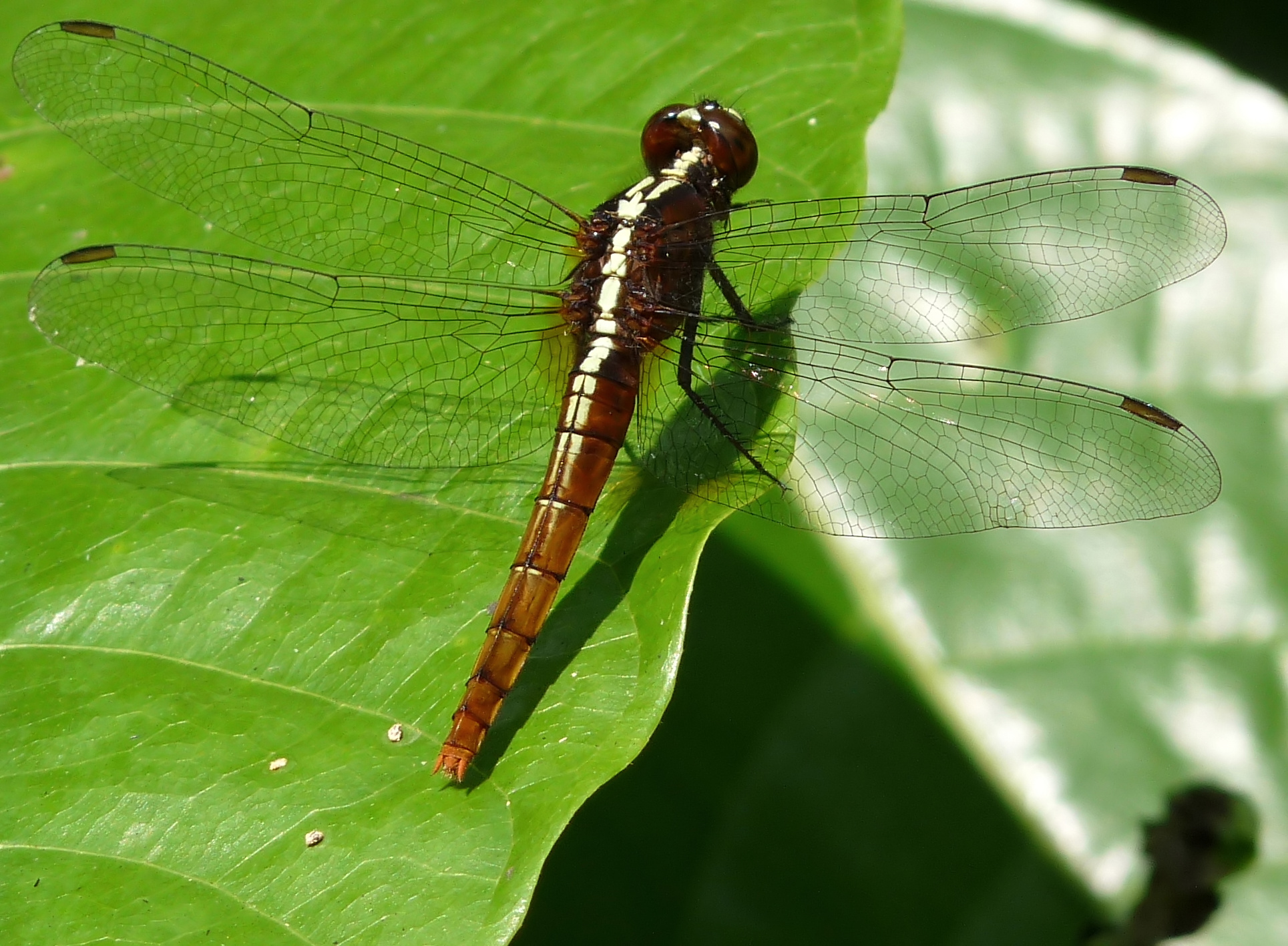
Rhodothemis rufa, female

== Etymology ==
The genus name Rhodothemis combines the Greek ῥόδο- (rhodo, "rosy") and -themis, from Greek Θέμις (Themis), the goddess of divine law, order and justice. In early odonate taxonomy, names ending in -themis were introduced by Hagen and were widely used for dragonflies. The name probably refers to the colour of the male.

== Species ==
The genus Rhodothemis includes the following species:

Male	Female	Scientific name	Common name	Distribution
		Rhodothemis lieftincki Fraser, 1954	red arrow	India, south-east Asia and Australia
		Rhodothemis mauritsi Lohmann, 1984		Indonesia, New Guinea
		Rhodothemis nigripes Lohmann, 1984		Indonesia
		Rhodothemis rufa (Rambur, 1842)	rufous marsh glider and common redbolt	Asia
