= Arrow Active =

British aerobatic aircraft

Active
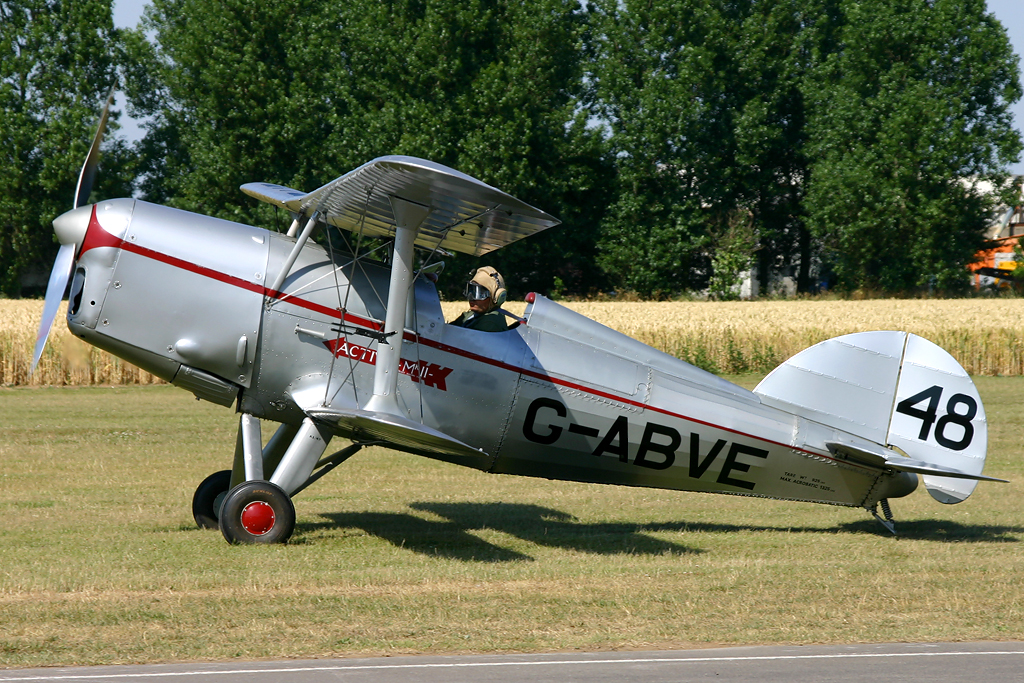
- Arrow Active 2

General information
- Type: Aerobatic sports aircraft
- Manufacturer: Arrow Aircraft Ltd.
- Designer: A. C. Thornton
- Number built: 2

History
- First flight: 1931

The Arrow Active is a British aerobatic aircraft built in the 1930s.

== Design and development ==
In 1930, Arthur Cecil Thornton, previously an aircraft designer with Blackburn Aircraft, set up his own company, Arrow Aircraft, at Leeds, Yorkshire, to develop his ideas for a single-seat aerobatic aircraft and advanced trainer. The resulting design, the Arrow Active was a single-seat biplane of conventional configuration, with single-bay, staggered wings of unequal span and chord, bordering on being a sesquiplane. The upper and lower wings are joined by a single interplane strut. The undercarriage is fixed, with a pair of mainwheels and a tail-skid. It was originally powered by a 115 hp (86 kW) Cirrus-Hermes IIB engine.

The second aircraft built featured a more powerful 120 hp (90 kW) de Havilland Gipsy III and was designated Active 2. It also differed from the Active 1 in having a strutted, conventional centre section, a slightly different shaped fin and rudder, and smaller, wider wheels.

== Operational history ==
Although it was originally hoped that the military might show an interest in the aircraft, this did not transpire, and the Active was flown as a sports plane. The Active 1 G-ABIX received its Certificate of Airworthiness on 21 May 1931 and flew at 132.2 mph (212 km/h) in the 1932 King's Cup Race. It was Alex Henshaw's mount in the second half of 1935 until severely damaged in a crash following an in-flight fire that December.

The Active 2 G-ABVE was certified on 29 June 1932 and flew in the King's Cup in both 1932 and 1933. Slightly faster than the Arrow 1, it recorded a speed of 137 mph (220 km/h)

== Variants ==
Active 1
One aircraft powered by a 115hp (86kW) Cirrus Hermes IIB engine.
Active 2
One aircraft powered by a 120hp (90kW) de Havilland Gipsy III engine, rebuilt in 1958 with a de Havilland Gipsy Major 1C.

== Surviving aircraft ==
Rebuilt in 1958, and again in 1989, the Active 2 is still on the British civil register and is based at Coventry, England.

== Specifications (Active 2) ==
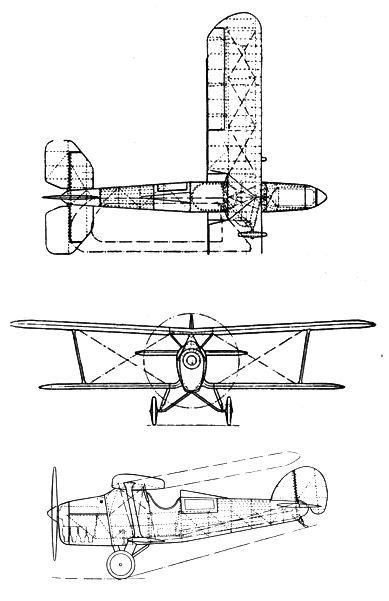
Arrow Active I 3-view drawing from L'Aerophile Salon 1932

Data from

General characteristics

- Crew: one pilot
- Length: 18 ft 10 in (5.74 m)
- Wingspan: 24 ft 0 in (7.32 m)
- Height: 7 ft 3 in (2.21 m)
- Wing area: 120 sq ft (11.2 m^{2})
- Empty weight: 925 lb (420 kg)
- Gross weight: 1,325 lb (600 kg)
- Powerplant: 1 × de Havilland Gipsy III inverted inline engine , 120 hp (80 kW)

Performance

- Maximum speed: 144 mph (230 km/h, 125 kn)
- Cruise speed: 128 mph (206 km/h, 111 kn)
- Range: 420 mi (676 km, 360 nmi)
