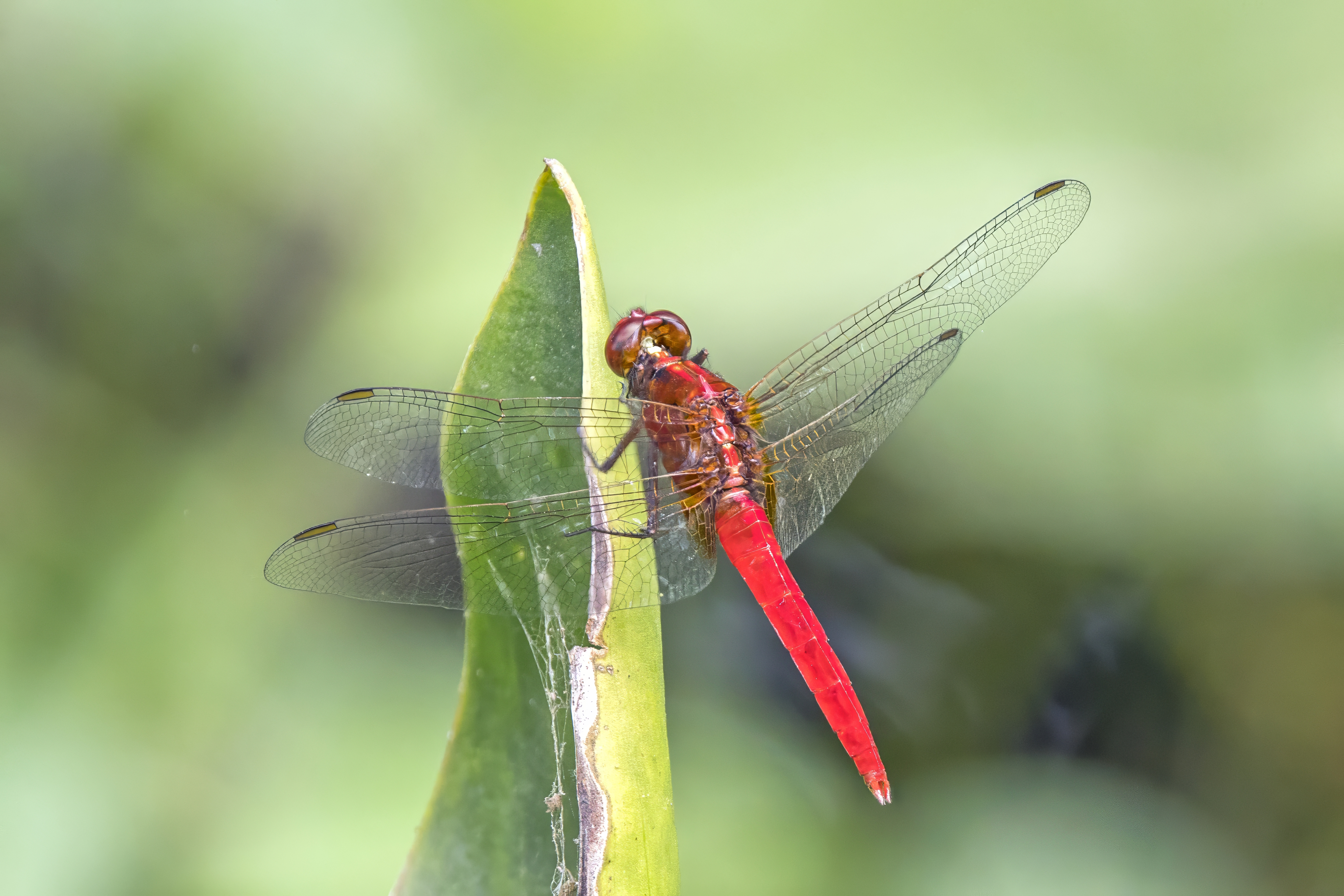
- male
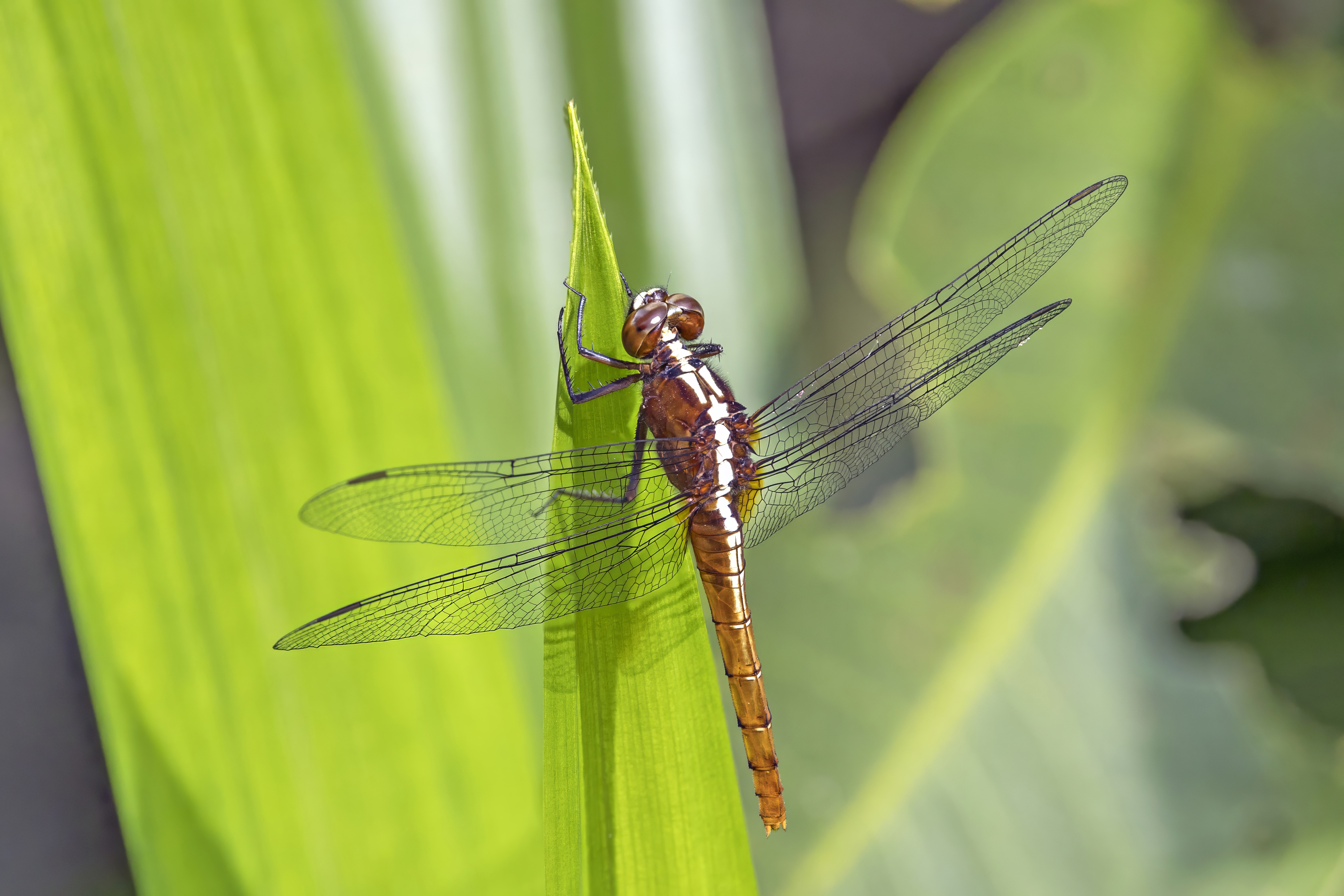
- female both in Saigon, Vietnam

Conservation status
- Least Concern (IUCN 3.1)

Scientific classification
- Kingdom: Animalia
- Phylum: Arthropoda
- Clade: Pancrustacea
- Class: Insecta
- Order: Odonata
- Infraorder: Anisoptera
- Family: Libellulidae
- Genus: Rhodothemis
- Species: R. rufa

Binomial name
- Rhodothemis rufa (Rambur, 1842)

Synonyms
- Crocothemis cruentata Hagen-Selys, 1878; Libellula oblita Rambur, 1842; Libellula rufa Rambur, 1842

= Rhodothemis rufa =

Species of dragonfly

Rhodothemis rufa, the spine–legged redbolt, rufous marsh glider, or common redbolt, ( is a species of dragonfly in the family Libellulidae. It is widespread in many Asian countries.

== Description and habitat ==
It is a medium-sized dragonfly with red eyes, thorax and abdomen. But young males and females have a mid-dorsal citron-yellow stripe in the pro-thorax and a citron-yellow stripe on mid-dorsum of the abdominal segments. These marks get obscured by pruinescence in adult males. Color of female is brown. It breeds in open ponds, marshes and lakes.

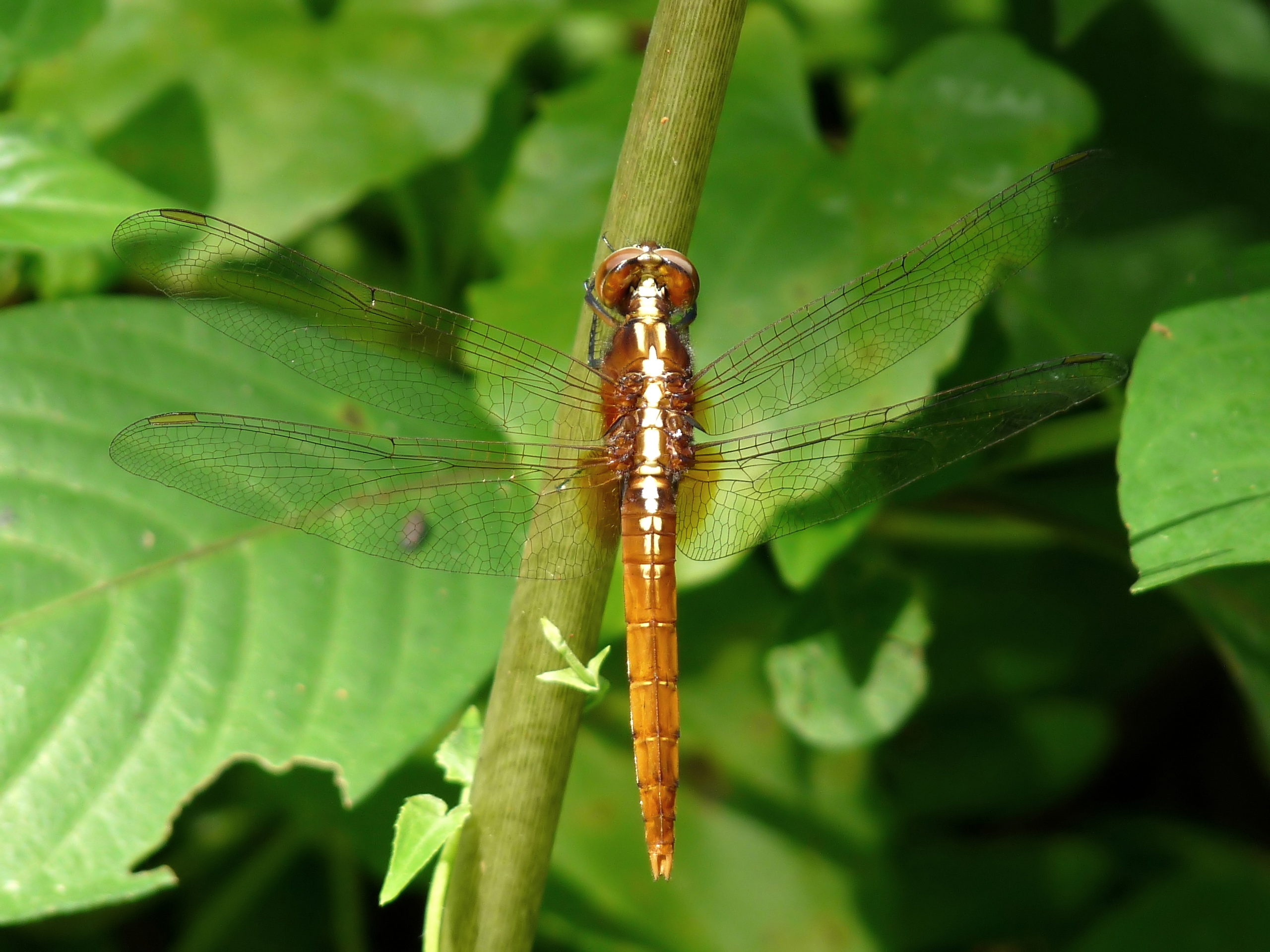
juvenile male

== See also ==
- List of odonates of Sri Lanka
- List of odonates of India
- List of odonata of Kerala
