= White Arrow (disambiguation) =

White Arrow were Japanese limited express train services

White Arrow and White Arrows may also refer to:

- White Arrows, a Los Angeles rock band
- White Arrows (EP), by Australian band Full Scale
- White Arrow Trail, a trail on Mount Monadnock, New Hampshire
- Frecciabianca (Italian for WhiteArrow), the brand name for 200 km/h Italian high speed trains
- White Arrow, a UK parcel delivery company started by Great Universal Stores

== See also ==
- Arrow (disambiguation)
- Black Arrow (disambiguation)
- Blue Arrow (disambiguation)
- Golden Arrow (disambiguation)
- Green Arrow (disambiguation)
- Pink Arrow (disambiguation)
- Red Arrow (disambiguation)
- Silver Arrow (disambiguation)
- Yellow Arrow (disambiguation)
