= Black Arrow (disambiguation) =

Black Arrow is a British satellite carrier rocket.

Black Arrow or Black Arrows may also refer to:

== Fiction ==
- The Black Arrow: A Tale of the Two Roses, an 1888 novel by Robert Louis Stevenson
  - Black Arrow (serial), a 1944 Columbia film serial
  - The Black Arrow (film), a 1948 film starring Louis Hayward
  - Black Arrow (1985 film), a Disney television movie
- Black Arrow (Middle-earth), a fictional Middle-earth weapon in The Hobbit
- Carla Day / Black Arrow, a singer played by Taylor Dayne in the superhero series Night Man
- Black Arrow (DC Comics), a fictional villain from DC Comics

== Weaponry ==
- Zastava M93 Black Arrow, a Serbian sniper rifle manufactured by Zastava Arms
- Operation Black Arrow, an Israeli military operation carried out in Gaza on 28 February 1955
- Black Arrow (missile), a small cruise missile produced by Leidos

== Miscellaneous ==
- The Black Arrows, a former aerobatics display team of the Royal Air Force of the UK.
- Black Arrows (EP), a 2003 EP by the Australian band Full Scale

== See also ==
- Arrow (disambiguation)
- Blue Arrow (disambiguation)
- Golden Arrow (disambiguation)
- Green Arrow (disambiguation)
- Pink Arrow (disambiguation)
- Red Arrow (disambiguation)
- Silver Arrow (disambiguation)
- White Arrow (disambiguation)
- Yellow Arrow (disambiguation)
