= Blue Arrow (disambiguation) =

Blue Arrow is a United Kingdom-based employment and recruitment agency.

Blue Arrow or Blue Arrows may also refer to:

- China Railways DJJ1 "Blue Arrow", a Chinese push-pull train
- Re Blue Arrow plc, a United Kingdom company law case dealing with unfair prejudice
- Flechas Azules Division (Blue Arrows), a Spanish division during the Spanish Civil War
  - Flechas Azules Mixed Brigade (Blue Arrows), a mixed Italo-Spanish brigade during the Spanish Civil War
- Blue arrow, a waymarking symbol denoting bridleways on Esk Valley Walk in North Yorkshire, England

== See also ==
- Arrow in the Blue, the title of the Arthur Koestler autobiography
- Arrow (disambiguation)
- Black Arrow (disambiguation)
- Golden Arrow (disambiguation)
- Green Arrow (disambiguation)
- Pink Arrow (disambiguation)
- Red Arrow (disambiguation)
- Silver Arrow (disambiguation)
- White Arrow (disambiguation)
- Yellow Arrow (disambiguation)
