= Bimota BB3 =

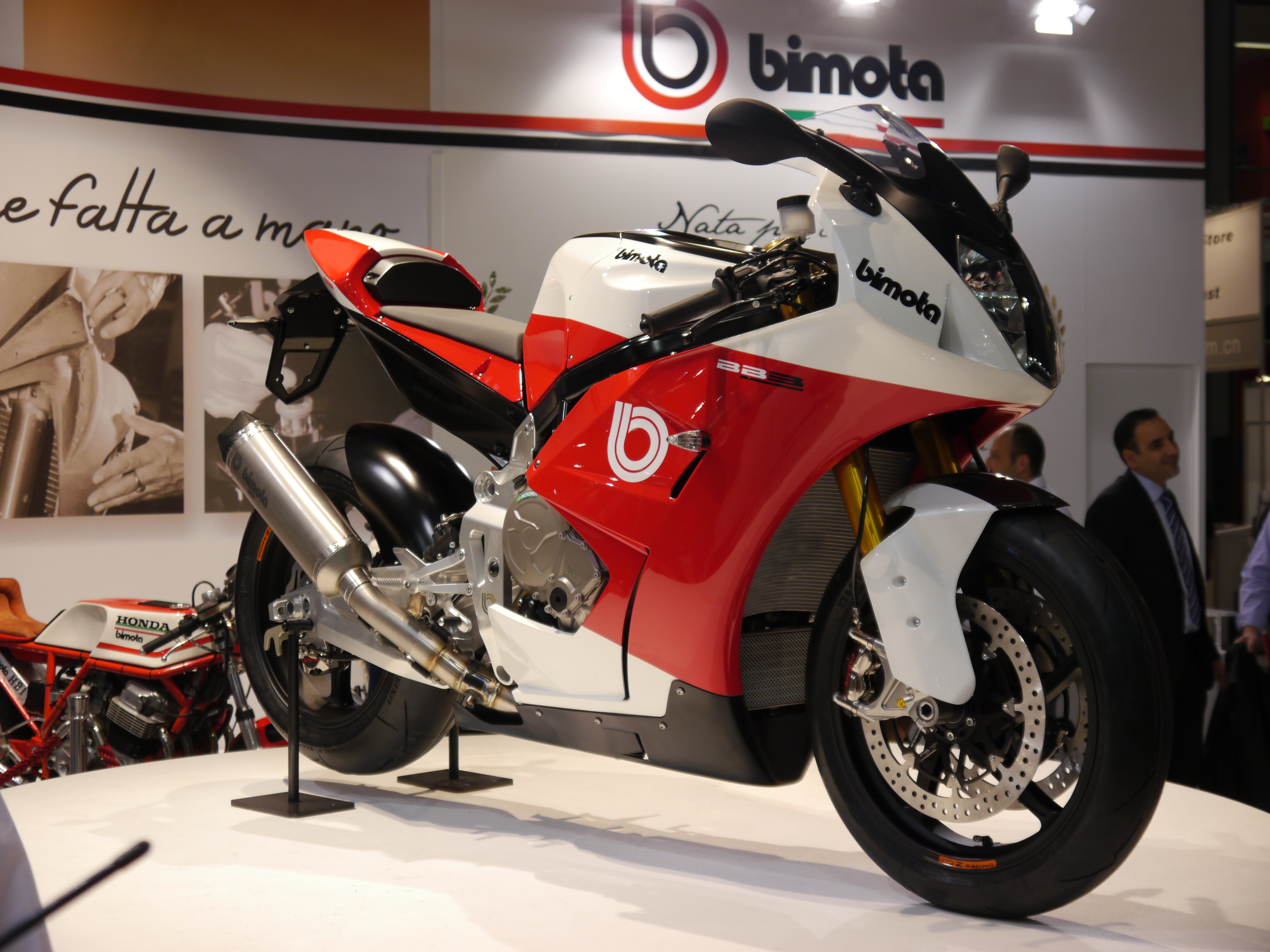
- Manufacturer: Bimota
- Production: 2013–2015, 26 produced
- Successor: Bimota KB998
- Class: Sport bike
- Power: 193 hp
- Brakes: Brembo, Goldline, Full Floating Cast Iron Front Rotors

The Bimota BB3 is a sport bike produced the Italian motorcycle manufacturer Bimota.

At the EICMA 2012 show, Bimota presented the BB2. First, it is a prototype intended to receive public criticism. The following year, Bimota offered the BB3, the production model.

The engine is four cylinders in line, four stroke, which is found on the BMW S1000RR. It develops 193 hp at 13000 rpm for a torque of 11.2 mkg at 9750 rpm. This engine is enclosed by a frame whose principle is identical to that of the Bimota DB8, namely a tubular trellis on the front part connected to two plates in aluminum on both sides. Braking is ensured by Brembo, thanks to two discs 320 mm in diameter at the front, bitten by four-piston radial calipers, and a simple disc of 220 mm in diameter at the back, clamped by a double piston caliper. The BB3 is equipped with an ABS. The 43 mm inverted telescopic fork and the mono shock are signed by Öhlins. The forged aluminum rim s come from the OZ Racing catalog. The exhaust is supplied by Arrow.

From the end of 2015, Bimota offers the BB3 as a kit, to be assembled. The purchaser must obtain the motor and the electronic wiring from an S1000RR. The parts come from machines intended to certify participation in Superbike in 2014, which could not receive an engine. The BB3 is presented in a white, red and black livery but it can be only white and black or completely black. It can also be covered with white, red, black and green paint on the limited edition T Tropheo wanted by the English importer to celebrate the commitment to the Tourist Trophy.
