= Silverpilen =

Silverpilen, Swedish for "the Silver arrow", can refer to:

- SL C5, a Swedish metro train, colloquially known as Silverpilen
- The Silver Train of Stockholm, a ghost train said to roam the Stockholm metro, also known as Silverpilen
- Husqvarna Silverpilen, a racing motorcycle by Husqvarna Motorcycles
- Zilverpijl, comic book series known in Sweden as Silverpilen
