= Yellow Arrow (disambiguation) =

Yellow Arrow is a public art project that was active from 2004-2006.

Yellow Arrow may also refer to:

- "The Yellow Arrow", a 1993 short story by Victor Pelevin
- "La Flecha Amarilla" (the Yellow Arrow), a nickname of Spanish cyclist Miguel Poblet

== See also ==
- Arrow (disambiguation)
- Black Arrow (disambiguation)
- Blue Arrow (disambiguation)
- Golden Arrow (disambiguation)
- Green Arrow (disambiguation)
- Pink Arrow (disambiguation)
- Red Arrow (disambiguation)
- Silver Arrow (disambiguation)
- White Arrow (disambiguation)
