= River Arrow =

The River Arrow may mean:

- The River Arrow, Wales (includes the Herefordshire, England, portion of the river)
- The River Arrow, Worcestershire (includes the Warwickshire portion of the river)
- River Arrow Nature Reserve, in Alcester, Warwickshire, England

== See also ==
- Arrow River (disambiguation)
- Rivers of the United Kingdom
- Arrow (disambiguation)
- Arrow Creek (disambiguation)
