= Pitoikam, Arizona =

- Populated place
- Location within the state of Arizona Pitoikam (the United States)
- Coordinates: 31°48′40″N 111°40′46″W
- Country: United States
- State: Arizona
- County: Pima
- Elevation: 3,068 ft (935 m)
- Time zone: UTC-7 (Mountain (MST))
  - Summer (DST): UTC-7 (MST)
- Area code: 520
- FIPS code: 04-56575
- GNIS feature ID: 24565

Pitoikam is a populated place situated on the Tohono O'odham Indian Reservation in Pima County, Arizona, United States. Pitoikam means "sycamore place" in the O'odham language. It has also been known as Fresnal, Fresnal Well, Pitoi Kam, and Pitoikam Ranch. It officially became known as Pitoikam as a result of a Board on Geographic Names decision on April 10, 1941, which was the traditional name of the village and the name which the residents preferred to use. It has an estimated elevation of 3,068 feet (935 m) above sea level.
