= Plomosa, Arizona =

- Populated place
- Location within the state of Arizona Plomosa (the United States)
- Coordinates: 33°38′03″N 114°07′05″W
- Country: United States
- State: Arizona
- County: La Paz
- Elevation: 1,490 ft (450 m)
- Time zone: UTC-7 (Mountain (MST))
  - Summer (DST): UTC-7 (MST)
- Area code: 928
- FIPS code: 04-56850
- GNIS feature ID: 24567

Plomosa is a populated place situated in La Paz County, Arizona, United States. The name is derived from the Spanish for "lead-colored", and also refers to the nearby Plomosa Mountains, which contain numerous lead-bearing mines.
