= Green Arrows =

Italian hardcore punk band

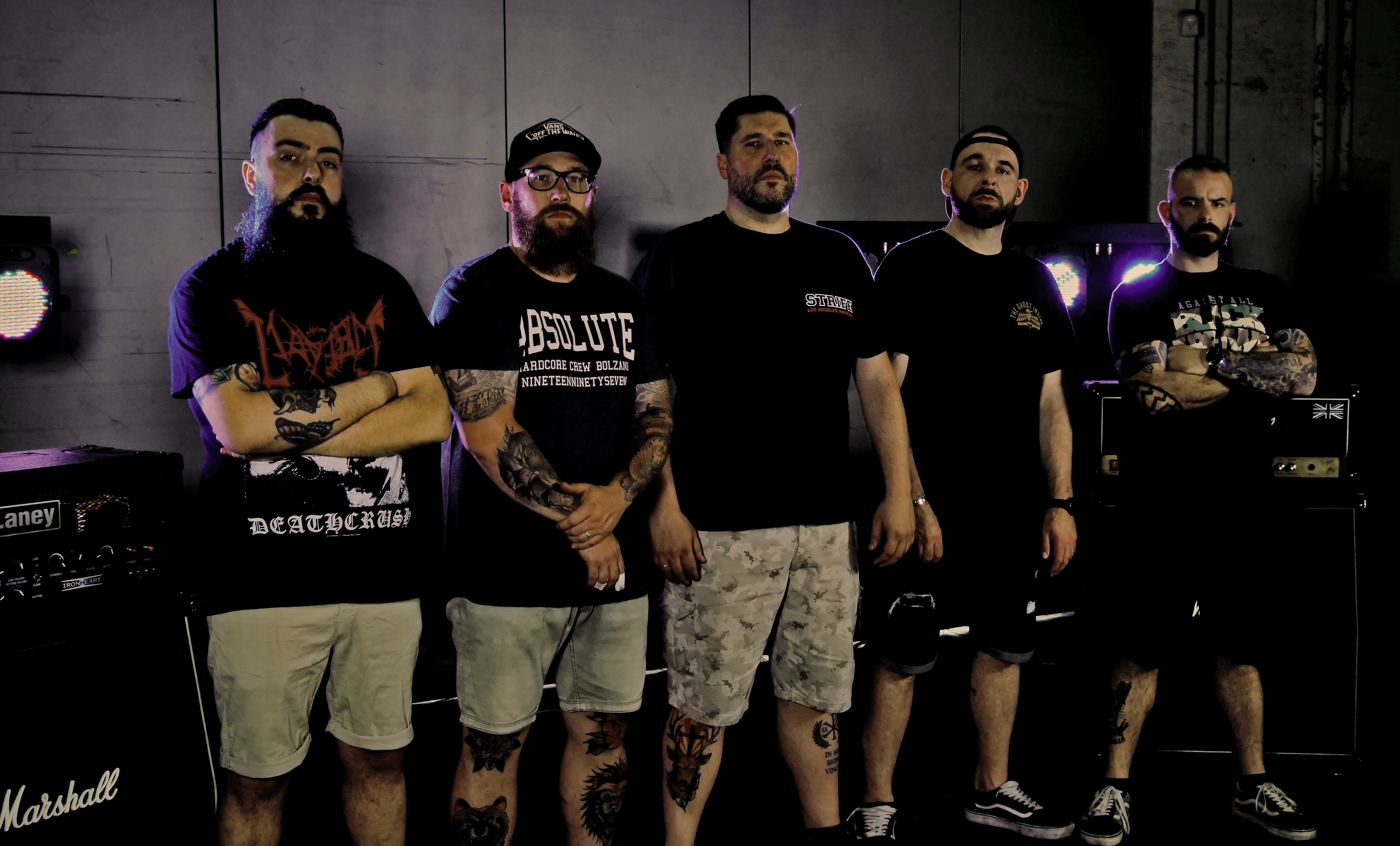
- Green Arrows' current line-up

Background information
- Origin: Bolzano, Italy
- Genres: Hardcore punk; punk metal; metallic hardcore
- Years active: 1999–present
- Labels: PC Records; Black Shirts Records; Vacation House Records
- Members: Pav; Dave; Divi; Migue; Ciachi
- Past members: See band members section
- Website: greenarrowshc.com

Green Arrows are an Italian hardcore punk band established in 1999 in the city of Bolzano.

== History ==
The band was founded in the 1999 in Bolzano, Far Northern Italy, from some young guys from the punk/hardcore scene of the city.

The band in the winter of 2000/01 won a festival that gave them the possibility to record a e.p. that procured a contract with the Italian independent label Vacation House Records.

In 2002, they came out with their first l.p. "The Sky": the album collects all the songs written in the first years of activity of the band, where the guys tried to create their own style, combining all the different music styles that are spinning around the hardcore, but without taking a precise direction.

These experimentations seem to don't convince the band, that after radical and numerous components changing, remains in a power-trio line-up. In 2008, they came back to record a new l.p., "The Earth", in which they tried to fix their style restricting the range of sonority between the east-coast hardcore and the crossover.

In 2010, they changed the label leaving the Vacation House Records for the Black Shirts Records, and in 2011, they released their third l.p., "Rising from a Burning Desease": this new album signed the change in the style that brought the Italian band to modify the drafting of the songs for keeping them concrete and effective, clutching more closely their sound and leaving away the contamination with external genres outside hardcore.

The beginning of 2012 was distinguished with a line-up extension with the joining of a second guitarist and with the release of "Face the Truth", their fourth studio l.p. This album confirmed the line settled with the previous record and becoming, for chronological and stylistic matters, the natural continuation of "Rising from a Burning Desease".

In mid-2013, they released the fifth l.p. "One Life to Fight", that contained an increasing of sonority of the guitars. The band moved away from the pure old-school style where the two guitars follow a common rhythm line, "detaching" one of it for giving them a lead line with harmonizations on the new-school/post-hardcore way. In this work, the band enlarged the line-up with the joining of Rocca at bass that was left by Pav, who became the front-man.

During the promotion of the album, the line-up of the band affected a change with the moving of Divi to the bass and the entry of Migue at the lead guitar. Ending the O.L.T.F. gigs, the band concentrated on the writing and arrangement of a new l.p. "Our Reality", that will be released in 2016, in which they followed amplifying the post-hardcore harmonization idea, joining it to a beatdown hardcore style, just strongly present in the last albums.

In 2018 announce the change of label passing from Black Shirts Records to PC Records and at the same time they announce the release of Live.Love.Burn.Die their seventh studio album. Unlike the previous album, the sound is a syncretism between the decision of the albums of the first half of the '10s and the harmony of the last two albums, thus managing to collect all the sound experience of the band. From the point of view of the writing, this album is presented as the first concept album of the band, where the release is divided in three chapters, each one dedicated to an aspect of life (My Path, My Roots, My War).

In few weeks from the release of Live.Love.Burn.Die they announce the reprint of their last 4 albums with Rebel Records. The reprints, compared to the first releases, contain some adds, or in the format (Digipack for Our Reality and One Life to Fight), or in the artworks (Face the Truth and Rising from a Burning Desease), or in the contents (3 bonus track in Rising from a Burning Desesase, in particular 3 songs contained in The Earth, but recorded 4 years before and with an unpublished line-up).

After a line-up change in 2020, they released in 2022 Holy Oath with Opos Records.

In 2024 they release the single track Dark Noises, a rewrite and new recording of the song contained in the first album, The Sky, to celebrate the band's 25th anniversary.

== Influences ==
The main influence is from other bands of the hardcore scene at the end of the '90s in Bolzano: No Choice, Last Man Standing, Bound, although initially they are detaching from it for following various experimentations of sound contaminations.

In that light, the first album "The Sky", the band proposed an unusual line-up for the genre, where, over at the classic guitarist, bassist and drummer there was a d.j./producer. The idea was to search sonority given by samplings and disc-scratchings, like proposed in crossover by Limp Bizkit and Deftons, and in industrial by Slipknot and Mushroomhead. The songs of this first record tried to have a starting direction in HxC style, like Agnostic Front or Biohazard, continuing with a skatepunk, darkwave or crossover sounds, ending even with ska.

From the second album "The Earth", they clutched the sound range, limiting themselves to mix the hardcore punk with metal riff and cadenced rhythm, on the way of the U.S. east-coast bands.

From "Rising from a Burning Desease", the absence of extra-hardcore contaminations is noticeable, leaving space to a bigger presence of breakdown, with beatdown influence on the Terror, Hatebreed, Death Before Dishonor style.

From "One Life to Fight" to "Our Reality", i.e. from the joining of a lead guitar, appears new-school/post-hardcore riffs that opened the sound to harmonizations and solos.

In Live.Love.Burn.Die they tried to merge between the style of the first ten years (Rising from a Burning Desease and Face the Truth) with that of the last releases (One Life to Fight and Our Reality) joining old-school and beatdown parts with harmonizations and solos.

== Members ==
=== Current line-up ===
- Pav (Karma) - lead vocals (2004–present), bass (1999-2013)
- Dave (Fog) - drums (2003–present)
- Divi - bass (2014–present), backing vocals (2011–present), guitar (2011-2014)
- Migue - guitar, backing vocals (2014–present)
- Ciachi - guitar, backing vocals (2020–present)

=== Former member ===
- Marmo - guitar, backing vocals (2000–2020)
- B.J. - lead vocals, guitar (1999-2004)
- Rocca - bass (2012-2014)
- Secco - drums (2001-2003)
- Master One - electronics, backing vocals (2002-2005)
- Eng - drums (1999; 2000), guitar, backing vocals (2001)
- Johnny Nazgul - guitar, backing vocals (2004–2005)
- Delfo - guitar, backing vocals (2000)
- Curly - drums (1999–2000)
- Fly - drums (1999)

== Discography ==
=== Album (first release) ===
- The Sky (P 2002 - R 2003 - Vacation House Records)
- The Earth (P 2008 - R 2009 - Vacation House Records)
- Rising from a Burning Desease (P 2010 - R 2011 - Black Shirts Records)
- Face the Truth (R 2011 - P 2012 - Black Shirts Records)
- One Life to Fight (P&R 2013 - Black Shirts Records)
- Our Reality (P 2015 - R 2016 - Black Shirts Records)
- Live.Love.Burn.Die (P&R 2018 - PC Records released in jewelcase and Digipack)
- Holy Oath (P&R 2022 - OPOS Records)

=== Single Track ===
- Dark Noises (25th Anniversary Edit) (P&R 2024 - U-Boot37 Registrazioni) only in digital or in compilations
- Related Reactions (25th Anniversary Edit) (P&R 2024 - U-Boot37 Registrazioni) only in digital or in compilations
- Unnecessary Heroes (25th Anniversary Edit) (P&R 2024 - U-Boot37 Registrazioni) only in digital or in compilations
- One Life, One Chance (25th Anniversary Edit) (P&R 2025 - U-Boot37 Registrazioni) only in digital

=== Album (reprints) ===
- Rising from a Burning Desease (P 2018 - Rebel Records - with new artworks, and tracklist enlonged with 3 bonus track)
- Face the Truth (P 2018 - Rebel Records - with new artworks)
- One Life to Fight (P 2018 - Rebel Records - in Digipack)
- Our Reality (P 2018 - Rebel Records - in Digipack)
- Live.Love.Burn.Die (P&R 2018 - PC Records)
- Rising from a Burning Desease (P 2019 - Black Shirts Records - in LP, available 3 colors: classic black, brass yellow, marble gray + limited nr Test Pressing)

=== In compilations ===
- Mixer Compilation (P&R 2001)
- Punikoff vol.1 (P&R2017)>
- No More Fires! (P&R2020)
- Music for the Earth (P&R2020)

=== Videoclip ===
- Paper Bullets (from "Face the Truth" - P&R 2012 - StudioZEM)
- Watch at my Face (from "Face the Truth" - P&R 2012 - StudioZEM)
- Stick to my Beliefs (from the compilation "Punikoff vol.1" and "Live.Love.Burn.Die" - P&R 2018 - Massagrande/L'ombra del suono)
- Keep the Flame Alive (from "Live.Love.Burn.Die" - P&R 2019 - U-Boot37)
- Reborn (from "Live.Love.Burn.Die" - P&R 2019 - Castaldini/U-Boot37)
- I Will Never FAll (from "Holy Oath" - P&R 2022 - Castaldini/U-Boot37)
