= Papago, Arizona =

- Populated place
- Location within Arizona Location within the United States
- Coordinates: 33°06′15″N 113°08′21″W
- Country: United States
- State: Arizona
- County: Maricopa
- Elevation: 660 ft (200 m)
- Time zone: UTC-7 (Mountain (MST))
  - Summer (DST): UTC-7 (MST)
- Area code: 928
- FIPS code: 04-52510
- GNIS feature ID: 24552

Papago is a populated place situated in Maricopa County, Arizona, United States. It has an estimated elevation of 656 feet (200 m) above sea level. It is located on the Union Pacific Railroad's Phoenix Subdivision.
