= Arrow Aircraft Ltd. =

1930s aircraft manufacturer in the United Kingdom

Arrow Aircraft (Leeds) Limited was a British aircraft manufacturer of the 1930s based in Leeds. Its most significant design was the Arrow Active, an example of which is still flying as of 2007.
