= Piato Vaya, Arizona =

- Populated place
- Location within the state of Arizona Piato Vaya (the United States)
- Coordinates: 32°03′02″N 112°09′28″W
- Country: United States
- State: Arizona
- County: Pima
- Elevation: 2,400 ft (730 m)
- Time zone: UTC-7 (Mountain (MST))
  - Summer (DST): UTC-7 (MST)
- Area code: 520
- FIPS code: 04-55105
- GNIS feature ID: 24559

Piato Vaya is a populated place situated in Pima County, Arizona, United States. It has an estimated elevation of 2,395 feet (730 m) above sea level.
