= Pivahn-hon-kya-pi, Arizona =

Populated place in Navajo County, Arizona

- Populated place
- Location within the state of Arizona Pivahn-hon-kya-pi (the United States)
- Coordinates: 35°53′22″N 110°41′59″W
- Country: United States
- State: Arizona
- County: Navajo
- Elevation: 6,096 ft (1,858 m)
- Time zone: UTC-7 (Mountain (MST))
  - Summer (DST): UTC-7 (MST)
- Area code: 928
- FIPS code: 04-56610
- GNIS feature ID: 24558

Pivahn-hon-kya-pi, also known as Pi Va Hon Kia Pi, is a populated place situated in Navajo County, Arizona, United States.
