= Pia Oik, Arizona =

- Populated place
- Location within the state of Arizona Pia Oik (the United States)
- Coordinates: 31°56′48″N 112°32′31″W
- Country: United States
- State: Arizona
- County: Pima
- Tribe: Tohono O'odham Nation
- Elevation: 1,965 ft (599 m)
- Time zone: UTC-7 (Mountain (MST))
  - Summer (DST): UTC-7 (MST)
- Area code: 520
- FIPS code: 04-55070
- GNIS feature ID: 9387

Pia Oik is a populated place situated in Pima County, Arizona, United States. It has an estimated elevation of 1,965 feet (599 m) above sea level.
