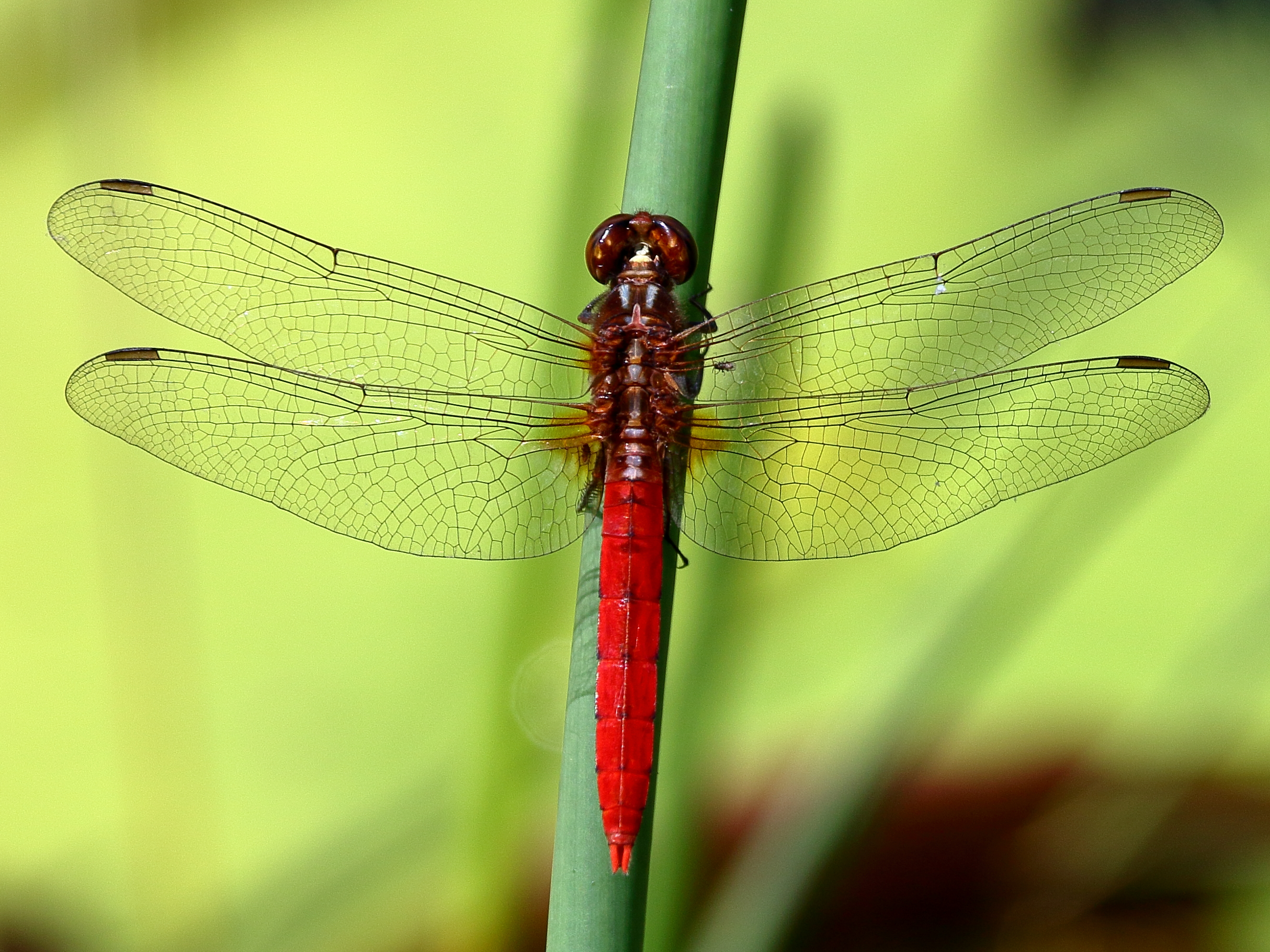
- Male
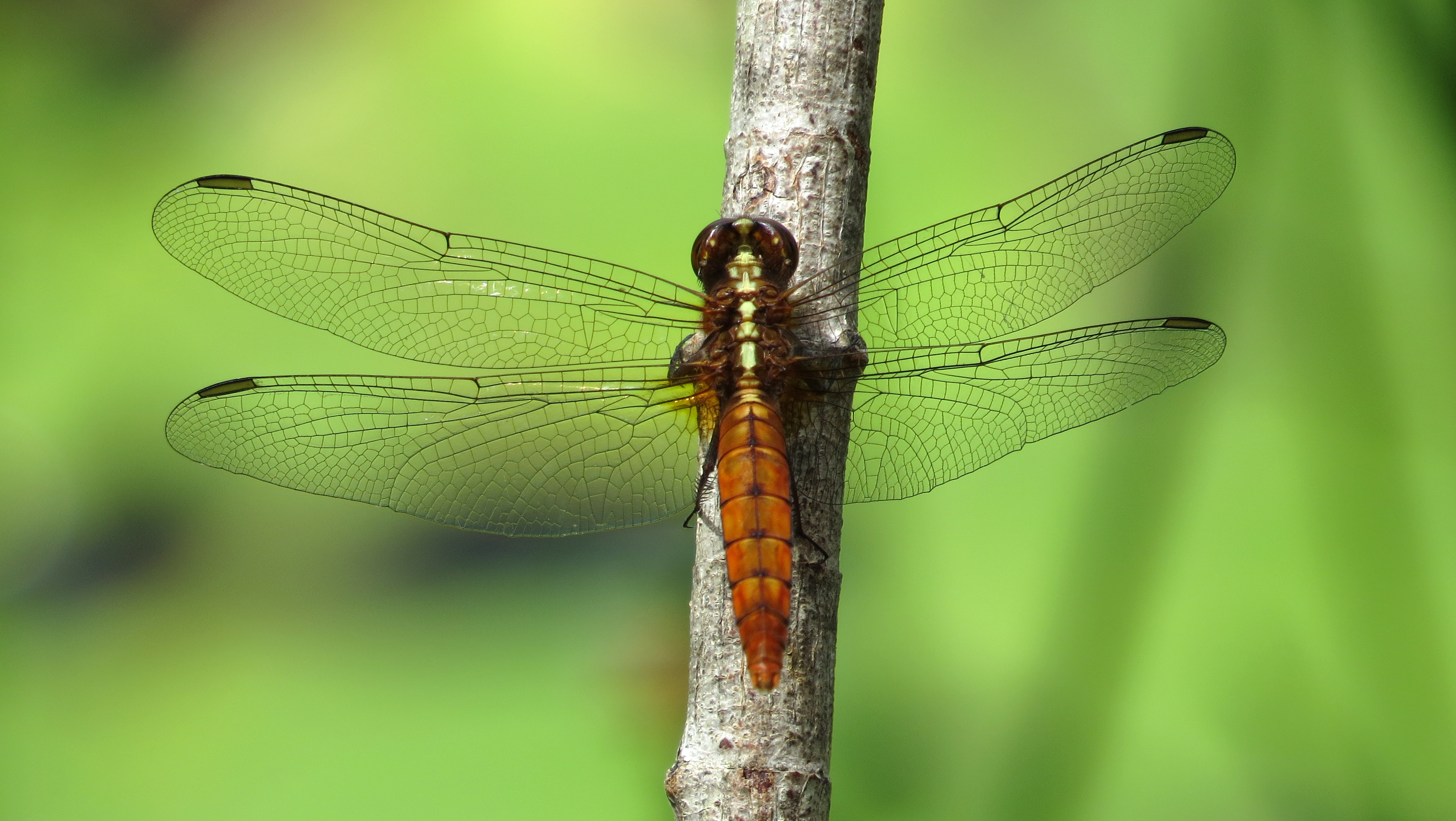
- Female

Conservation status
- Least Concern (IUCN 3.1)

Scientific classification
- Kingdom: Animalia
- Phylum: Arthropoda
- Clade: Pancrustacea
- Class: Insecta
- Order: Odonata
- Infraorder: Anisoptera
- Family: Libellulidae
- Genus: Rhodothemis
- Species: R. lieftincki

Binomial name
- Rhodothemis lieftincki Fraser, 1954

= Rhodothemis lieftincki =

Species of dragonfly

Rhodothemis lieftincki, common name Red arrow, is a species of dragonfly in the family Libellulidae. The genus Rhodothemis is found in India, south-east Asia and Australia. Rhodothemis lieftincki is the only species of the genus seen in Australia. It inhabits coastal and inland streams, rivers, lagoons and ponds in an arc around northern Australia, from about Geraldton in the west to Sydney in the east.

Rhodothemis lieftincki is a medium-sized dragonfly with a wingspan about 60-85mm. The adult male is red in colour, and the female is a duller brown or orange.

Rhodothemis lieftincki has been assessed for the IUCN Red List as being of least concern.

== Etymology ==
The genus name Rhodothemis combines the Greek ῥόδο- (rhodo, "rosy") and -themis, from Greek Θέμις (Themis), the goddess of divine law, order and justice. In early odonate taxonomy, names ending in -themis were widely used for dragonflies.

In 1954, F. C. Fraser named this species lieftincki, an eponym honouring Maurits Lieftinck (1904–1985) for his contributions to the knowledge of Papuan Odonata.

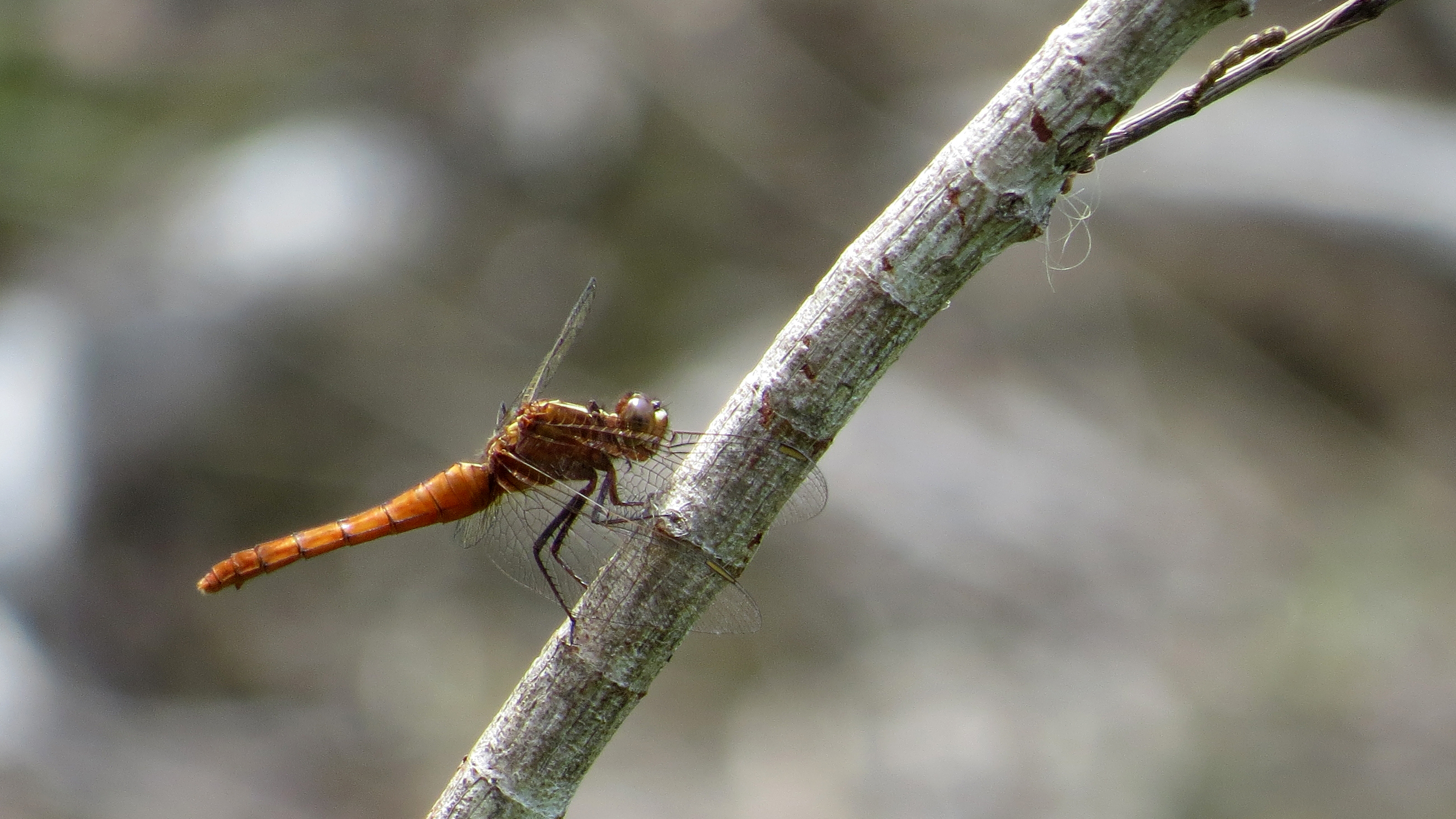
Female side view

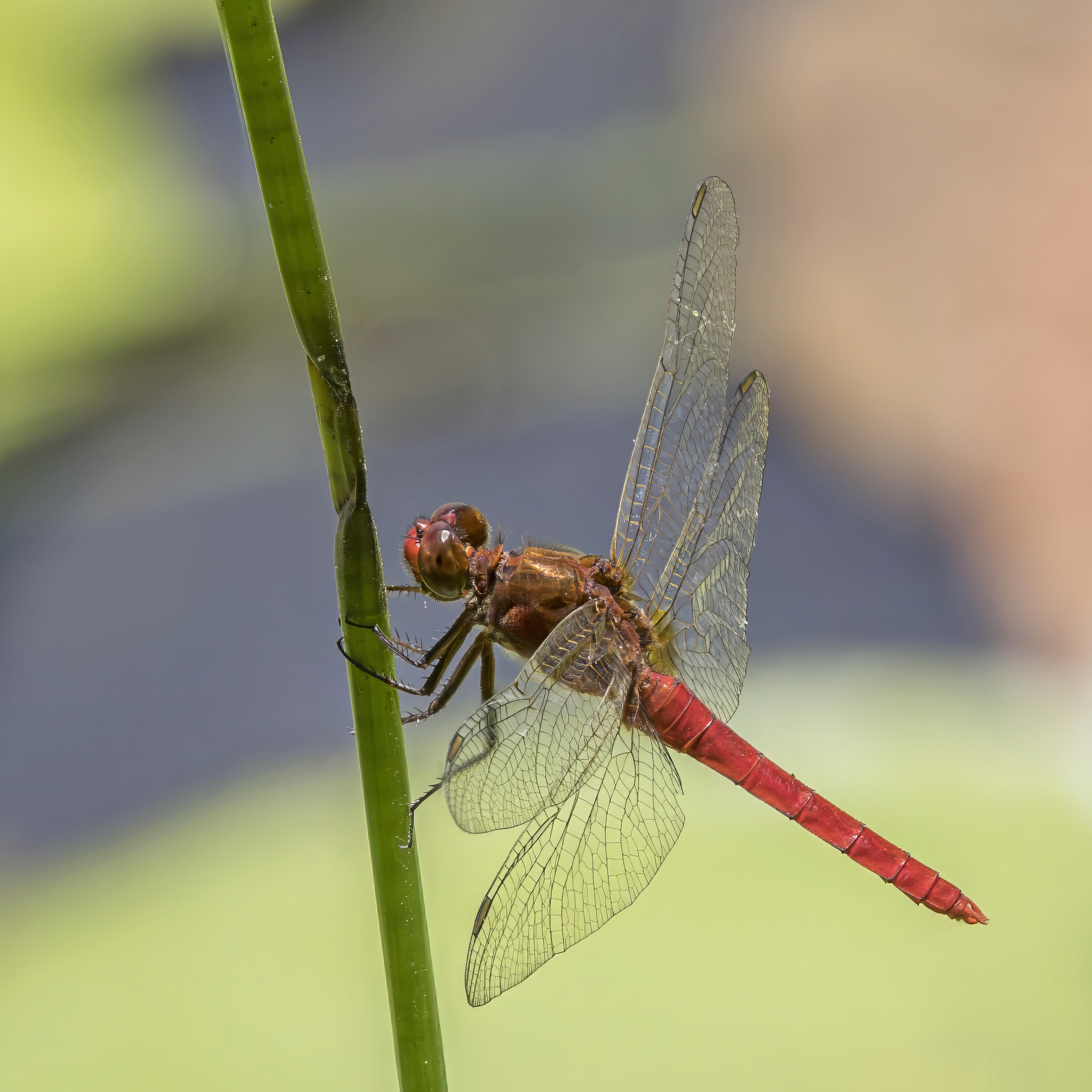
Male side view

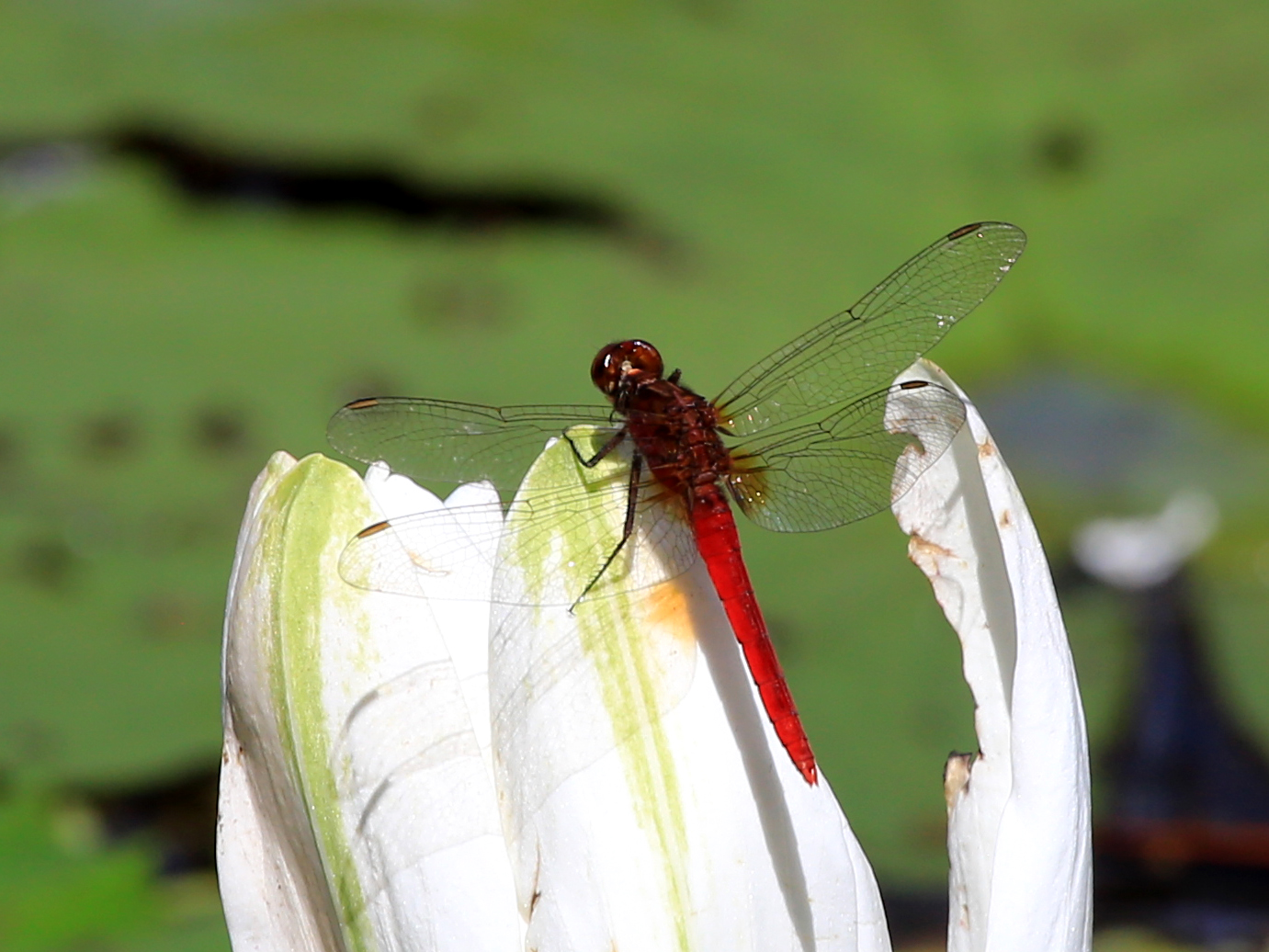
Male

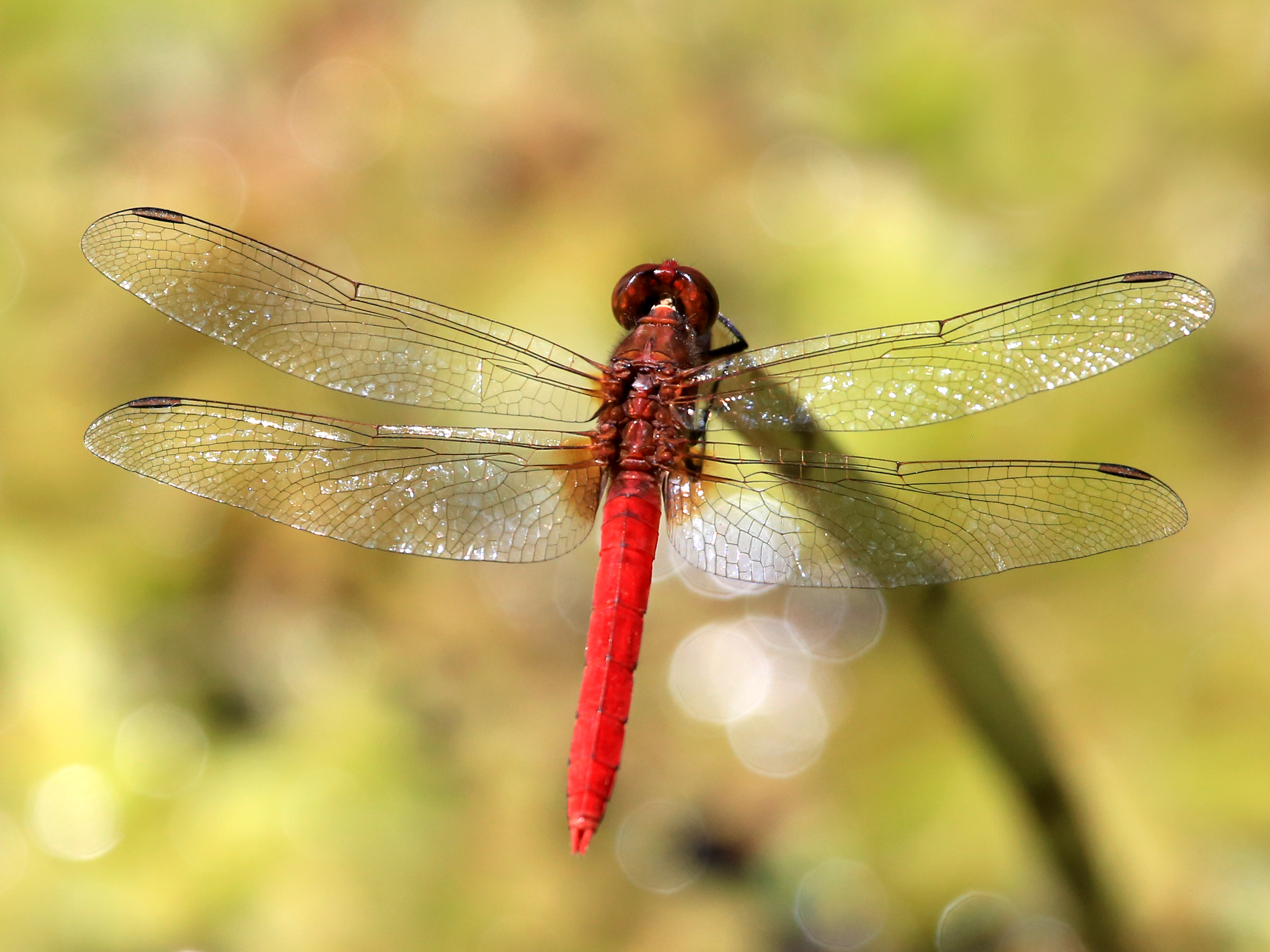
Male, Cairns, Queensland

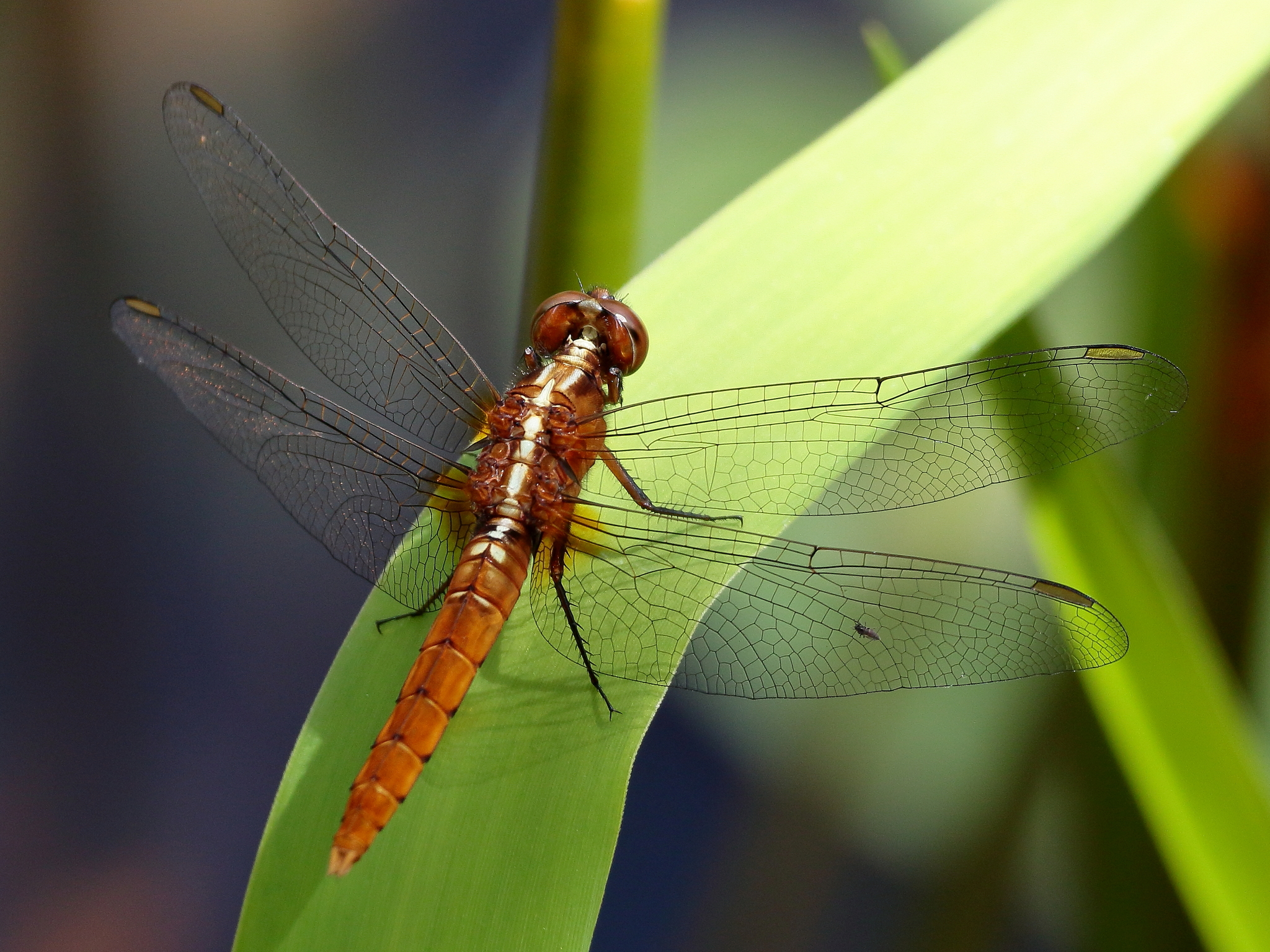
Young male

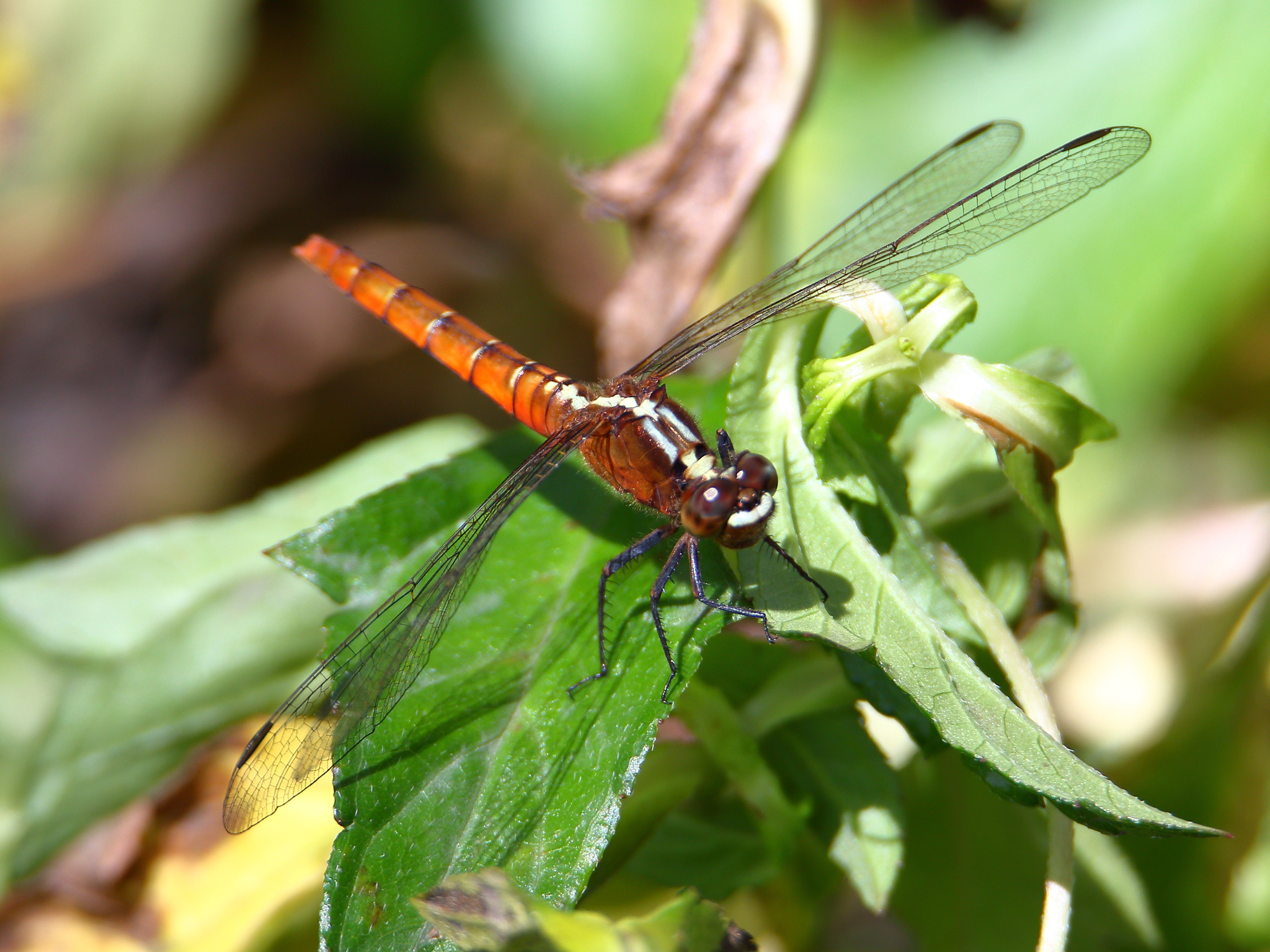
Female face

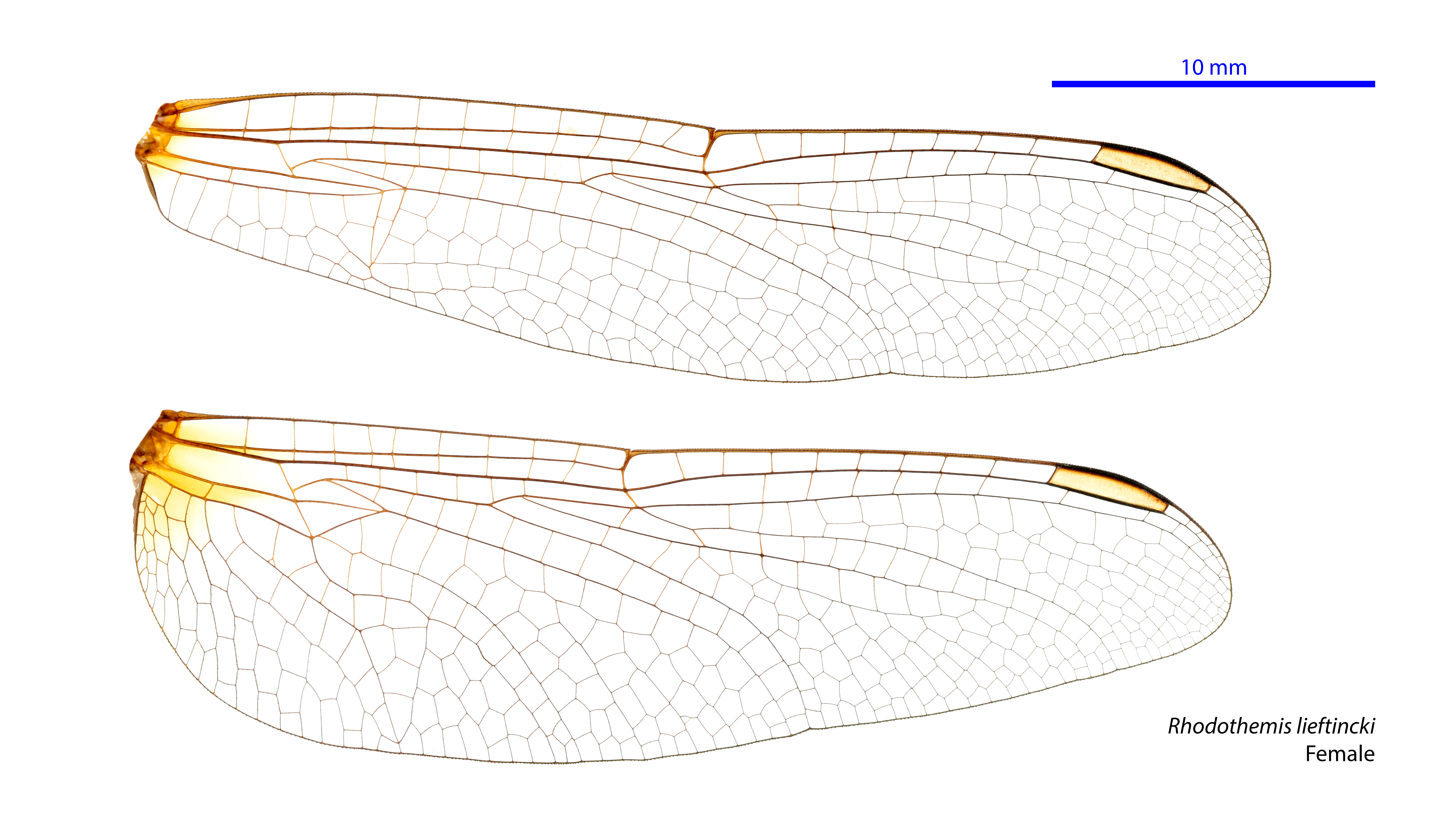
Female wings

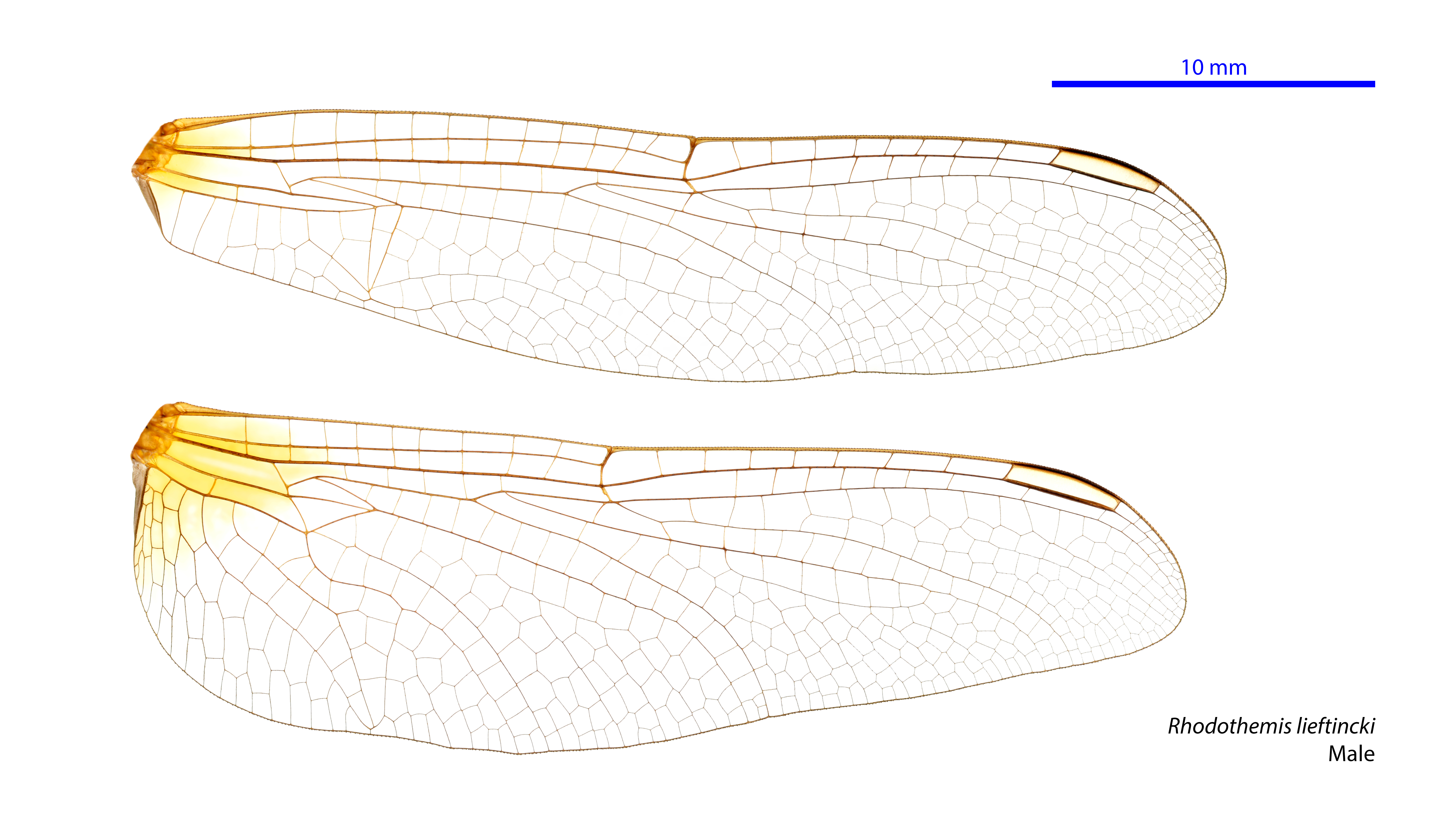
Male wings
