= Planet, Arizona =

Populated place in La Paz County, Arizona

Coordinates: 34°14′51″N 113°57′54″W

Planet is a populated place on the north bank of the Bill Williams River in La Paz County, Arizona, United States. The town was known as a travelers' stopping place, and had a post office from 1902 to 1921. It is now a ghost town. It is part of the United States Bureau of Reclamation's Planet Ranch Conservation Area.

== Mining ==
The geology of the Planet area is ancient, estimated to be Precambrian, the bedrock being made up mostly of pinkish gneiss and absorbed limestone and amphibolite, which contained hematite-copper. Gold and the copper were discovered in La Paz County in the early 1860s. The Planet area began producing ore c.1868, making it likely the first copper mine in Arizona. Prospectors received trouble from Apaches in the area until 1874, when they were placed on reserves. Smelting and bullion production, assaying at about 5% copper, began in the 1880s. By 1884, the mine had sent more than 6,000 tons of high-quality copper to San Francisco. Transporting freight 28 miles to Planet cost $10 to $18 a ton. There was for a while limited access to Planet, a stage going between the town and Bouse (21.5 miles to the south) three times a week. With 31 lode claims, the mine was noted as a good example of the state's abundant natural resources. In 1906, the mine was owned by J. Stanley Jones of Denver, Colorado.

The NewPlanet Mining Company was incorporated in Delaware on July 13, 1909. Its predecessor, the Planet Copper Mining Co., had taken over the mine in 1902. By 1916, the Planet Copper Mine was producing 3,929,000 lbs. of copper a year; it ranked as the 25th most productive copper mine in the United States. By 1920, the company's stock assets amounted to $4 million at $5 a share. That year, the superintendent of the mine was Claude Ferguson.

== Planet Ranch ==
Property around Planet later became known as the Planet Ranch, owned by the Arizona Ranch and Metals Company. The City of Scottsdale acquired Planet Ranch in 1984 in an unsuccessful attempt to use its water rights to support the city. Freeport-McMoRan acquired the Planet Ranch from the City of Scottsdale. Freeport-McMoRan leased the land to the United States Bureau of Reclamation, then gave the land to the Arizona Game and Fish Department. Reclamation administers the land as part of its Lower Colorado River Multi-Species Conservation Program.

== See also ==
- Swansea, Arizona
