= Abaris Golden Arrow =

General information
- Type: Homebuilt civil utility aircraft
- Manufacturer: Abaris Aircraft

The Abaris Golden Arrow was a planned homebuilt civil utility aircraft, intended to be manufactured in kit form. It was an unusually large aircraft for its type, able to seat six people (including the pilot) and, also unusually in a homebuilt plane, powered by a turboprop engine.

The Golden Arrow was intended to be of conventional monoplane configuration, with retractable tricycle undercarriage and a T-tail. It was largely of composite construction.

The craft derived its name from a legendary arrow, carried by the ancient Greek sage Abaris the Hyperborean. The arrow, given to Abaris by the sun-god Apollo, conferred upon its bearer the power of flight.

In 2003, the first aircraft was not yet complete when the company closed down.

== Powerplant ==
The Golden Arrow's 750 hp Walter M601 turboprop was part of a wider trend in the late 1990s toward turbine power in kit aircraft. The M601, a Czech engine in production since the mid-1970s, is similar in design to the ubiquitous Pratt & Whitney PT6, and a 1999 AOPA Pilot article noted that the kit-aircraft industry was the main beneficiary of the inexpensive Czech turbines then becoming available. The same article reported that one kit maker, Performance Aircraft, found that all but one of its 21 kit buyers chose the turbine option, because it offered more horsepower for less money.

== Specifications (estimated) ==
Data from

General characteristics

- Crew: 1
- Capacity: 5 pax
- Length: 31 ft 3 in (9.53 m)
- Wingspan: 42 ft 0 in (12.80 m)
- Height: 12 ft 0 in (3.66 m)
- Airfoil: NACA 65-215
- Empty weight: 3,000 lb (1,361 kg)
- Gross weight: 5,800 lb (2,631 kg)
- Powerplant: 1 × Walter M601 turboprop, 750 hp (560 kW)

Performance

- Maximum speed: 274 kn (315 mph, 507 km/h)
- Range: 1,450 nmi (1,670 mi, 2,690 km)
- Service ceiling: 26,000 ft (7,900 m)
- Rate of climb: 3,425 ft/min (17.40 m/s)
- Power/mass: 0.13 hp/lb (0.21 kW/kg)
