= Palomas, Arizona =

- Populated place
- Location within the state of Arizona Palomas (the United States)
- Coordinates: 32°54′32″N 113°28′53″W
- Country: United States
- State: Arizona
- County: Yuma
- Elevation: 407 ft (124 m)
- Time zone: UTC-7 (Mountain (MST))
  - Summer (DST): UTC-7 (MST)
- Area code: 928
- FIPS code: 04-52180
- GNIS feature ID: 24549

Palomas is a populated place situated in Yuma County, Arizona, United States. It is located along the Gila River in the Park Valley

The location was first settled in the late 1800s, and named Doanville, after one of the first settlers, John Doan. A post office by that name was opened in 1889, but was changed to the Palomas post office in 1891. Palomas is a Spanish word meaning doves, and it refers to the large flocks of doves which migrate to this area each summer. It has an estimated elevation of 407 feet (124 m) above sea level.
