= Pipyak, Arizona =

- Populated place
- Location within the state of Arizona Pipyak (the United States)
- Coordinates: 32°18′49″N 111°47′22″W
- Country: United States
- State: Arizona
- County: Pima
- Elevation: 1,906 ft (581 m)
- Time zone: UTC-7 (Mountain (MST))
  - Summer (DST): UTC-7 (MST)
- Area code: 520
- FIPS code: 04-56385
- GNIS feature ID: 24564

Pipyak is a populated place situated in Pima County, Arizona, United States. It has an estimated elevation of 1,906 feet (581 m) above sea level.
