= Point of Pines, Arizona =

- Populated place
- Location within the state of Arizona Point of Pines (the United States)
- Coordinates: 33°21′35″N 109°44′50″W
- Country: United States
- State: Arizona
- County: Graham
- Elevation: 5,922 ft (1,805 m)
- Time zone: UTC-7 (Mountain (MST))
  - Summer (DST): UTC-7 (MST)
- Area code: 928
- FIPS code: 56860
- GNIS feature ID: 9596

Point of Pines is a populated place situated on the San Carlos Apache Indian Reservation in Graham County, Arizona, United States.
