= Arrows (The Lonely Forest album) =

Studio album by The Lonely Forest
- Released: March 22, 2011
- Genre: Alternative rock, indie rock, emo
- Label: TransRecords

The Lonely Forest chronology
The Lonely Forest EP (2010)	Arrows (2011)	Adding Up the Wasted Hours (2013)

Singles from Arrows
- 1. "Turn Off This Song and Go Outside" Released: September 4, 2010

Professional ratings
Aggregate scores
Source	Rating
Metacritic	60/100
Review scores
Source	Rating
AllMusic	4/5 stars
Consequence of Sound	2/5 stars
TRT	Positive

Arrows is the third studio album by the alternative rock band The Lonely Forest. The album was released on March 22, 2011, on Trans Records.

== Track listing ==
1. Be Everything
2. Turn Off This Song and Go Outside
3. (I Am) the Love Skeptic
4. (I Am) the Love Addict
5. Coyote
6. I Don't Want To Live There
7. Tunnels
8. Two Notes and a Beat
9. End It Now!
10. Woe is Me... I Am Ruined
11. We Sing In Time
12. Arrows

== Accolades ==
Publication	Country	Accolade	Year	Rank
Amazon	US	The 100 Best Albums of 2011	2014	18
