= Arrow (surname) =

Arrow is a surname. Notable people with the surname include:

- Gilbert John Arrow (1873–1948), English entomologist
- Jai Arrow (born 1995), Australian rugby league footballer
- Kenneth Arrow (1921–2017), American economist, mathematician and political theorist, Nobel laureate in economics
- Michelle Arrow, Australian historian, academic and author
- Ronnie Arrow (born 1947), American former college basketball coach
- Tre Arrow, American environmental activist and convicted arsonist born Michael Scarpitti in 1974
