= Arrow, Kentucky =

Unincorporated community in Kentucky, United States

Arrow
- Unincorporated community
- Location within the state of Kentucky Arrow (the United States)
- Coordinates: 37°31′58″N 82°7′38″W
- Country: United States
- State: Kentucky
- County: Pike
- Elevation: 1,106 ft (337 m)
- Time zone: UTC-5 (Eastern (EST))
  - Summer (DST): UTC-4 (EDT)
- GNIS feature ID: 2337488

Arrow is an unincorporated community and defunct coal town in Pike County, Kentucky, United States.
