= Golden Arrow (horse) =

American-bred Thoroughbred racehorse

- Sire: Fort Salonga
- Grandsire: Mahmoud
- Dam: Rock Mart
- Damsire: Sunador
- Sex: Gelding
- Foaled: 1961
- Country: United States
- Color: Bay
- Breeder: Louis A. Filios
- Owner: Louis A. Filios
- Trainer: George R. Handy; Bill Sienkewicz
- Record: 176: 58-25-22
- Earnings: US$167,264

Major wins
- Thanksgiving Day Handicap (1965)

Golden Arrow (April 9, 1961 – 1989) was a Thoroughbred race horse that endeared himself to many New Englanders during the 1960s and 70s. Golden Arrow won 58 times in his extensive career. The Thanksgiving Day Handicap at Lincoln Downs in 1965 was his biggest stakes win. At that point in time, he was trained by George R. Handy and ridden to victory by jockey Frankie Solimena. He would win the East Providence Handicap at Lincoln as a five-year-old.

Golden Arrow won 7 races as a four-year-old and 8 races as a thirteen-year-old. The gelding raced every year from age 3 to age 18.

Narragansett Park gained national attention in the summer of 1978, when the seventeen-year-old Golden Arrow won 4 races at the track for trainer Bill Sienkewicz of Land's End Farm. Much of the training took place on the beaches of Buzzards Bay with the trainer's wife, Phreddy, working and galloping the horse. Golden Arrow was owned by Louis A. Filios and bred in New Jersey. Golden Arrow's story was documented by Sports Illustrated in their September 3, 1979 issue (see:)

Debbie Riemers, an apprentice jockey, rode the old favorite in all of his victories that summer.

The gelding won 5 races out of 7 starts in 1978 with a second and a third place finish as well. His last victory occurred at the Great Barrington Fair on 9/25/78.

"I bet on that horse ten years ago" was a common refrain.

In the summer of 1967, owner Filios sent Golden Arrow to Canada. While north of the border the 6-year-old won two handicap races at old Blue Bonnets in Montreal.
