= Arrow Creek (Fresno County, California) =

Location
- Country: United States
- State: California

Physical characteristics
- Source
  - location: Fresno County
- Mouth: South Fork Kings River
  - coordinates: 36.869937°N 118.516210°W
  - elevation: 6,919 ft (2,109 m)

Arrow Creek is a stream in Kings Canyon National Park in Fresno County, California, United States. It is a tributary of the South Fork Kings River.
