= Arrow (motorcycle part manufacturer) =

Italian motorcycle part manufacturer

Arrow Special Parts SpA
- Arrow Logo
- Company type: Private
- Industry: Motorcycle Exhausts; Motorcycle Parts
- Founded: 1985
- Founder: Giorgio Giannelli
- Headquarters: San Giustino, Perugia, Italy
- Website: www.arrow.it

Arrow Special Parts is an Italian motorcycle exhaust system manufacturer founded in 1985.

== History ==
Arrow was founded in 1985 in Italy by Giorgio Giannelli to make high performance exhaust systems. The company's first association with motorsports success was with Belgian rider Jobé winning the 500 cc Motocross World Championship.

Since 2000 Arrow parts have been used on bikes that won 20 World Titles, in SBK, SS, MX and Supermoto. In 2008, Arrow was associated with winners of the MX1 World Championship, with David Philippaerts, S2 Supermoto World Championship with Adrien Chareyre, and SS World Championship with Andrew Pitt.

Arrow also makes steering dampers and competition footpegs.

== See also ==
- List of Italian companies
