= Pink Arrow, Arizona =

Human settlement in Navajo County, Arizona, US

Pink Arrow is an unincorporated community in Navajo County, Arizona, United States. Pink Arrow is located at 35°46′37″N 110°09′26″W.
