= Arrow Rocks =

Island in New Zealand

Geography
- Coordinates: 34.99237°S 173.79792°E

Administration
- New Zealand
- Region: Northland

Demographics
- Population: uninhabited

The Arrow Rocks are islands that surround Oruatemanu Island of the Tauranga Bay in New Zealand, about 40 kilometres (25 mi) north of the Bay of Islands. One of the islands looks like an arrow or a bird's beak.

== See also ==
- List of islands of New Zealand
