= Zilverpijl =

French-Belgian comic series

- Cover to the first album (1970)

Publication information
- Publisher: Het Volk
- Format: Graphic novel
- Genre: Western
- Publication date: 1970–1986
- No. of issues: 92
- Main character(s): Zilverpijl, Valk, Manestraal

Creative team
- Written by: Frank Sels
- Artist(s): Frank Sels

Zilverpijl (Flemish for 'Silver Arrow') is a Belgian comic book series set in the American Old West. The main character in the series is a Native American chief called Zilverpijl, or Silver Arrow. The comic was created by Frank Sels and its artists include Edgard Gastmans and Karel Verschuere. The comic is called Hopeanuoli in Finland, Silverpilen in Sweden, Sølvpilen in Norway, Sølvpil in Denmark, Silberpfeil in Germany and Zilverpijl in the Netherlands.

The title character of the series is the young Native American chief Silver Arrow, a wise and resourceful chief of the Kiowa. Other main characters are his blood brother Falcon, and Silver Arrow's sister, Moonbeam. Her pet, the puma cub Tinka also has an important role. Falcon is Silver Arrow's blood brother, because he has saved his life. In most translations Falcon is directly translated from the Flemish Valk, in German his name is Falk, in Norwegian Falk, and in Swedish Falken. However, in Finnish, Valk became the Finnish-American Pekka Kenttä.

The comic was published in Finland for ten years from 1976 to 1985. Issues 3 through 24 in 1979 and 1 through 7 in 1980 also featured Turok as a black-and-white supplement. The comic also included factual information about Native Americans and instructions for constructing Native American equipment. There was also a "Zilverpijl Native American camp" at the Kullasvuori camping resort.
