= Honda CBR600 =

Honda CBR600 can refer to several Honda middleweight or supersport sport bikes.

- Honda CBR600F
- Honda CBR600F2
- Honda CBR600F3
- Honda CBR600F4
- Honda CBR600F4i
- Honda CBR600F (2011)
- Honda CBR600RR

== See also ==
- Honda CBR series
