= Maciej Serafin =

Polish racing driver

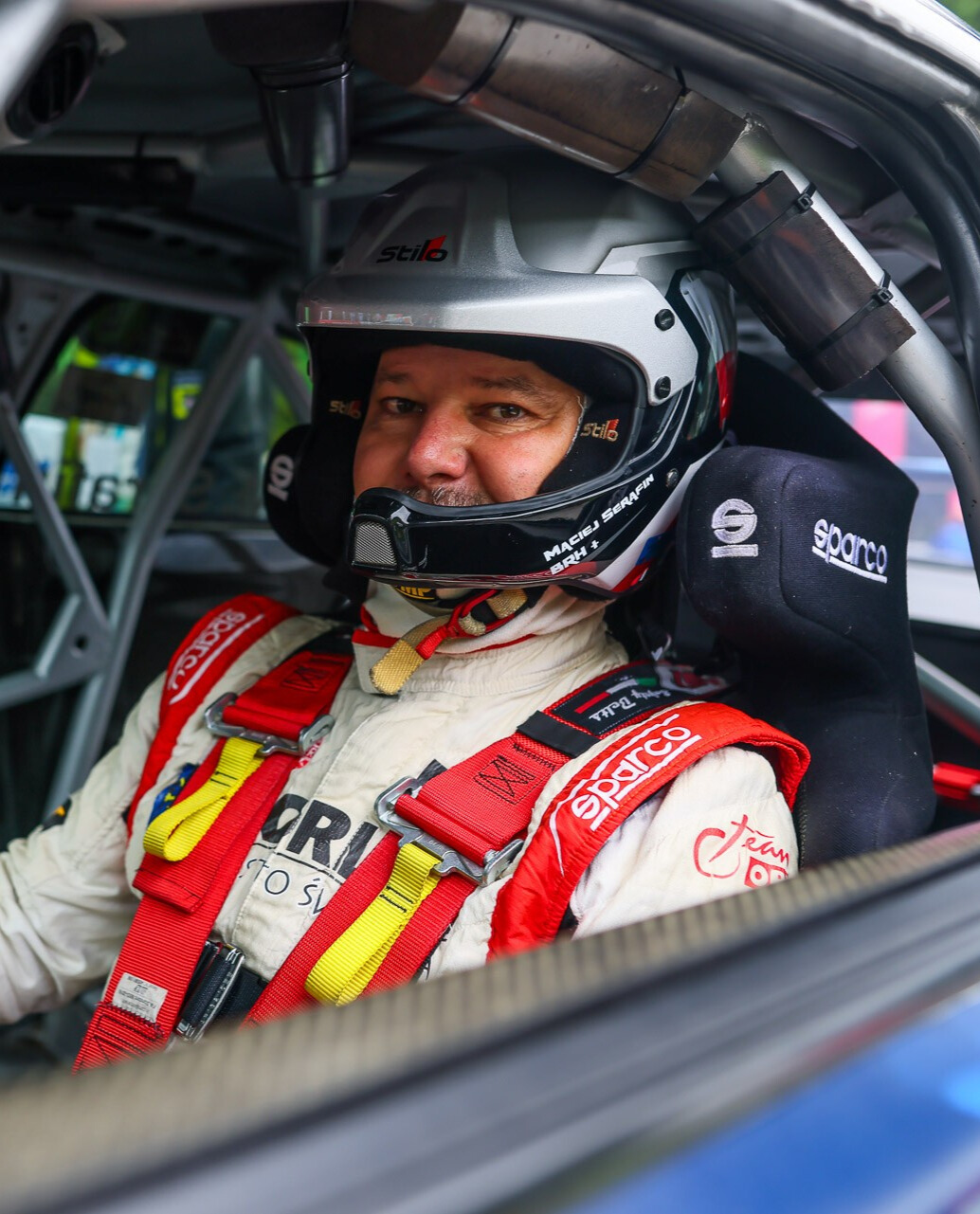
- Nationality: Poland
- Born: 3 March 1977 (age 49)
- Years active: 2018–present
- Teams: Kubit Motorsport (current)

Championship titles
- 3× Polish Hill Climb Champion (2019, 2020, 2025); 2× FIA European Hill Climb Champion (2022, 2023)

Maciej Serafin (born 3 March 1977) is a Polish racing driver specialising in hillclimb racing, representing the Automobilklub Biecki. He initially competed in motorcycle racing between 2000 and 2013, before transitioning to car racing. Serafin is a multiple champion of the Polish Hill Climb Championship (GSMP) and a two-time champion of the European Hill Climb Championship (EHC). In 2022 he became the first Polish driver to win an FIA European Hill Climb group title, and in 2023 the first Pole to reach the podium of Category 1 in the overall FIA EHC standings.

== Motorcycle career ==
Serafin began his motorsport career in motorcycle racing. From 2000 to 2013 he was a member of the Automobilklub Wielkopolski in Poznań. He competed on motorcycles including the Honda CBR 900 RR, Kawasaki ZXR 750, Yamaha YZF-R7, Yamaha YZF-R1 and BMW S1000RR. During this period he achieved multiple national podium finishes, won the Brandt racing series overall classification, and placed 4th in the BMW Cup in 2011. His motorcycle racing career ended after a serious accident, after which he transitioned to car racing.

== Car racing career ==
Serafin returned to competitive motorsport in 2018, debuting in the Polish Hill Climb Championship (GSMP) in a Renault Clio prepared for class A/PL.

=== 2018 season ===
In his debut season he finished 4th in the A/PL-2000 class, winning the second day of competition at Załuż and achieving six podium finishes.

=== 2019 season ===
Serafin continued in A/PL competition with Renault Clio. He won 11 of the 12 rounds he entered, securing the Polish Championship title in A/PL-2000 and finishing runner-up in the overall A/PL group classification.

=== 2020 season ===
Owing to COVID-19 restrictions, the 2020 GSMP season was reduced to three race weekends (six rounds). Serafin won every round and claimed his second consecutive Polish Hill Climb Championship title, competing in class 5b.

=== 2021 season ===
Serafin moved to class 5a, continuing with a further-modified Clio. He won six rounds and finished 3rd overall, only one point behind second place and six behind the champion.

=== 2022 season ===
Serafin entered the full season of the European Hill Climb Championship in group 5 with Renault Clio. He won rounds in Portugal, Poland, Switzerland and Slovenia, and finished second in France and the Czech Republic, becoming the first Polish driver to win a European Hill Climb group title (Group 5). After clinching the title, he contested the Croatian round in the higher Group 4, debuting with a 4th-place finish. He also made selected appearances in GSMP, taking four podiums across three weekends.

=== 2023 season ===
Switching to a Mitsubishi Lancer Evolution X, Serafin competed in Group 4 of the FIA EHC. He won the European Championship title in Group 4 and finished 3rd overall in Category 1 – the first Polish driver to reach the podium in the overall Category 1 standings. During the season he won rounds in the Czech Republic, Italy, Poland and Croatia, and finished second in Switzerland.

=== 2025 season ===
Returning to national competition, Serafin competed in the 2025 GSMP season with a Seat Leon Supercopa in class 4-2WD.

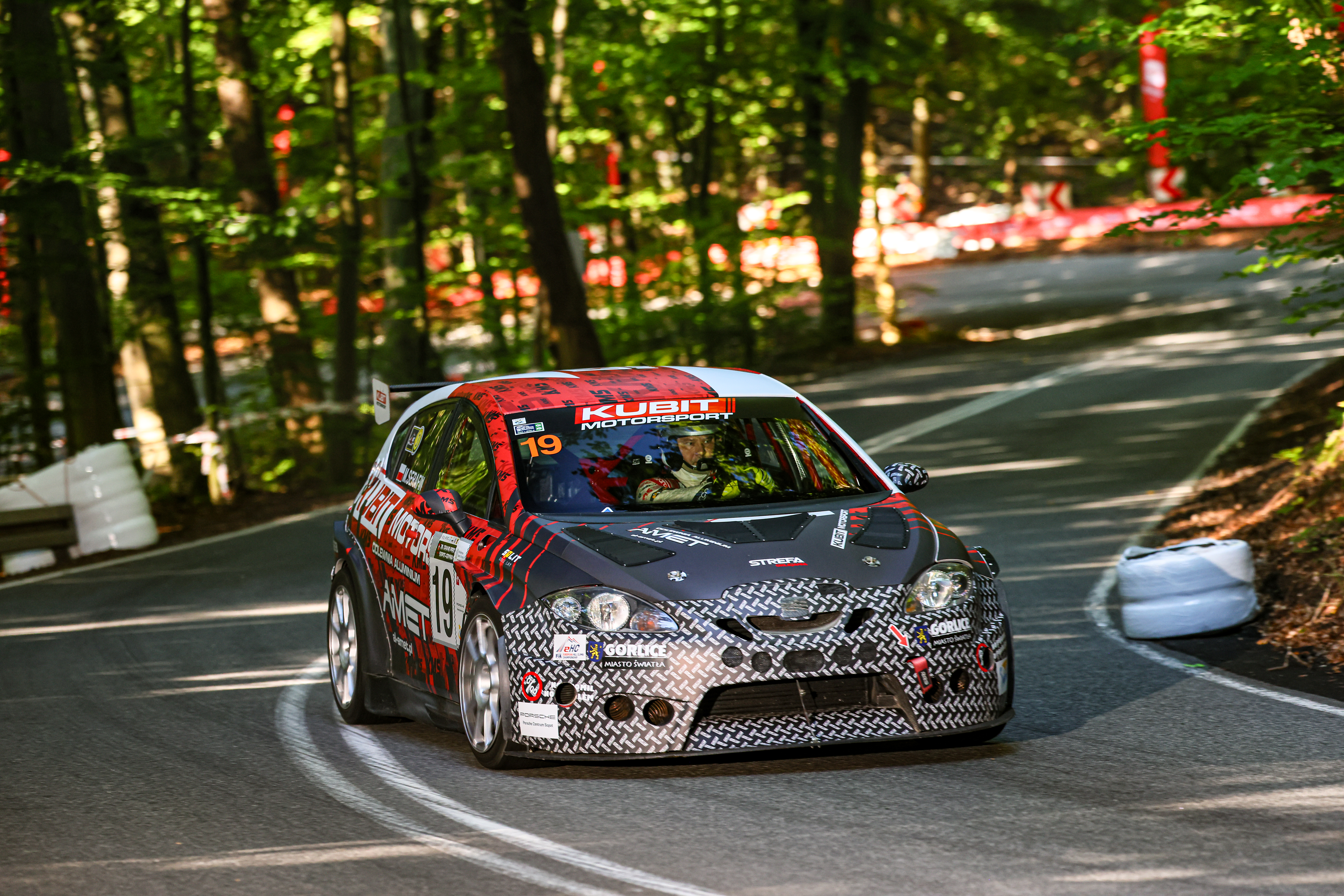
Maciej Serafin driving Seat Leon Supercopa at Grand Prix Sopot Gdynia hillclimb 2025

Joining from the second event in Korczyna, he won 7 of 10 rounds and secured the Polish Championship title in class 4-2WD by four points. He also appeared in two ARC Endurance series in the Czech Republic, driving a Volkswagen Golf GTI.

=== 2026 season ===
In February 2026, Serafin was officially confirmed on the entry list for the Pikes Peak International Hill Climb, becoming the first Polish driver in the history of the event, which has been held continuously since 1916. He is entered in the Time Attack 1 class driving a Honda Civic TCR/JAS, with the race scheduled for 21 June 2026. Serafin also announced plans to contest hillclimb events in Poland and Europe with the Honda Civic TCR.

== Polish National Hill Climb Championship results ==
Season	Class	Car	Position	Notes	Source
2018	A/PL-2000	Renault Clio	4	4th overall	
2019	A/PL-2000	Renault Clio	1	Polish Champion	
2019	A/PL	Renault Clio	2	Runner-up	
2020	5b	Renault Clio	1	Polish Champion	
2021	5a	Renault Clio	3	3rd overall	
2022	5a	Renault Clio	4	4th overall	
2023	4a	Mitsubishi Lancer Evolution X	3	3rd overall	
2025	4-2WD	Seat Leon Supercopa	1	Polish Champion	

== European Hill Climb Championship results ==
Season	Group/Class	Car	Position	Notes	Source
2022	Group 5	Renault Clio	1	European Champion	
2023	Group 4	Mitsubishi Lancer Evolution X	1	European Champion	
2023	Category 1 Overall	Mitsubishi Lancer Evolution X	3	Second runner-up	
