= Honda CBR750 =

Motorcycle

Honda CBR750 Super Aero
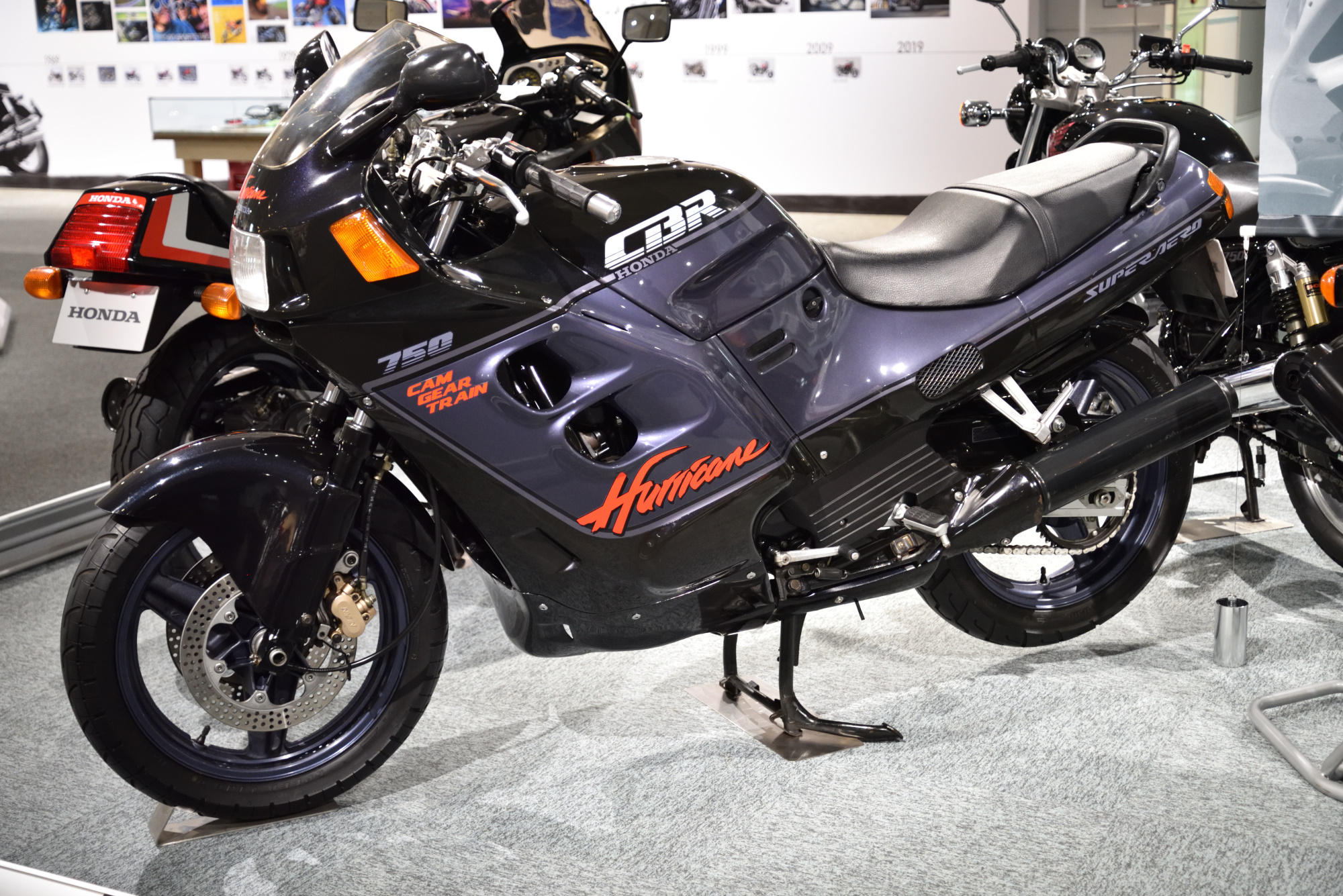
- 1987 Honda CBR750 Super Aero
- Manufacturer: Honda
- Production: 1987–1988
- Class: Sport bike
- Engine: 748 cc (45.6 cu in), liquid cooled, four-stroke, DOHC I4
- Bore / stroke: 70 mm × 48.6 mm (2.76 in × 1.91 in)
- Transmission: Six-speed constant mesh manual
- Suspension: Front: telescopic fork (with air spring cylinder); Rear: swingarm
- Brakes: Inboard single hydraulic front and rear
- Tires: Front: 110/80 17"; Rear: 140/70 18"
- Wheelbase: 1,480 mm (58 in)
- Dimensions: L: 2,170 mm (85 in); W: 750 mm (30 in); H: 1,185 mm (46.7 in)
- Seat height: 770 mm (30 in)
- Fuel capacity: 21 L (4.6 imp gal; 5.5 US gal)
- Related: Honda CBR600F; Honda CBR1000F

The Honda CBR750 Super Aero (Japanese: ホンダ・CBR750スーパーエアロ, Hepburn: Honda CBR750 Sūpā Earo) (model code RC27) is a sport bike, part of the CBR series, produced by Honda between 1987 and 1988. It is based on the European and US market CBR1000F.

== History ==
The CBR series launched in 1983 was a range of motorcycles with displacements of 250cc and 400cc, but in 1987, as the flagship model of the same series, a motorcycle of 750cc would debut exclusively for the Japanese domestic market.

== Specifications ==
The engine, with a cubic capacity of 748 cm^{3}, was a liquid-cooled four-cylinder in-line with double camshaft (DOHC: Double Overhead Camshaft) with 4 valves per cylinder for a total of 16. Fitted with a six-speed gearbox, the CBR750 used a multi-disc wet clutch. The engine was housed on the steel frame which guaranteed strength and lightness at the same time. The front suspension used was an adjustable telescopic fork. At the rear, however, it mounted a single shock absorber which was also adjustable. The braking system consisted of three discs, of which the front ones were double. In 1988, the CBR750 underwent a series of changes and improvements.
