= Honda CBR900RR =

Sport bike

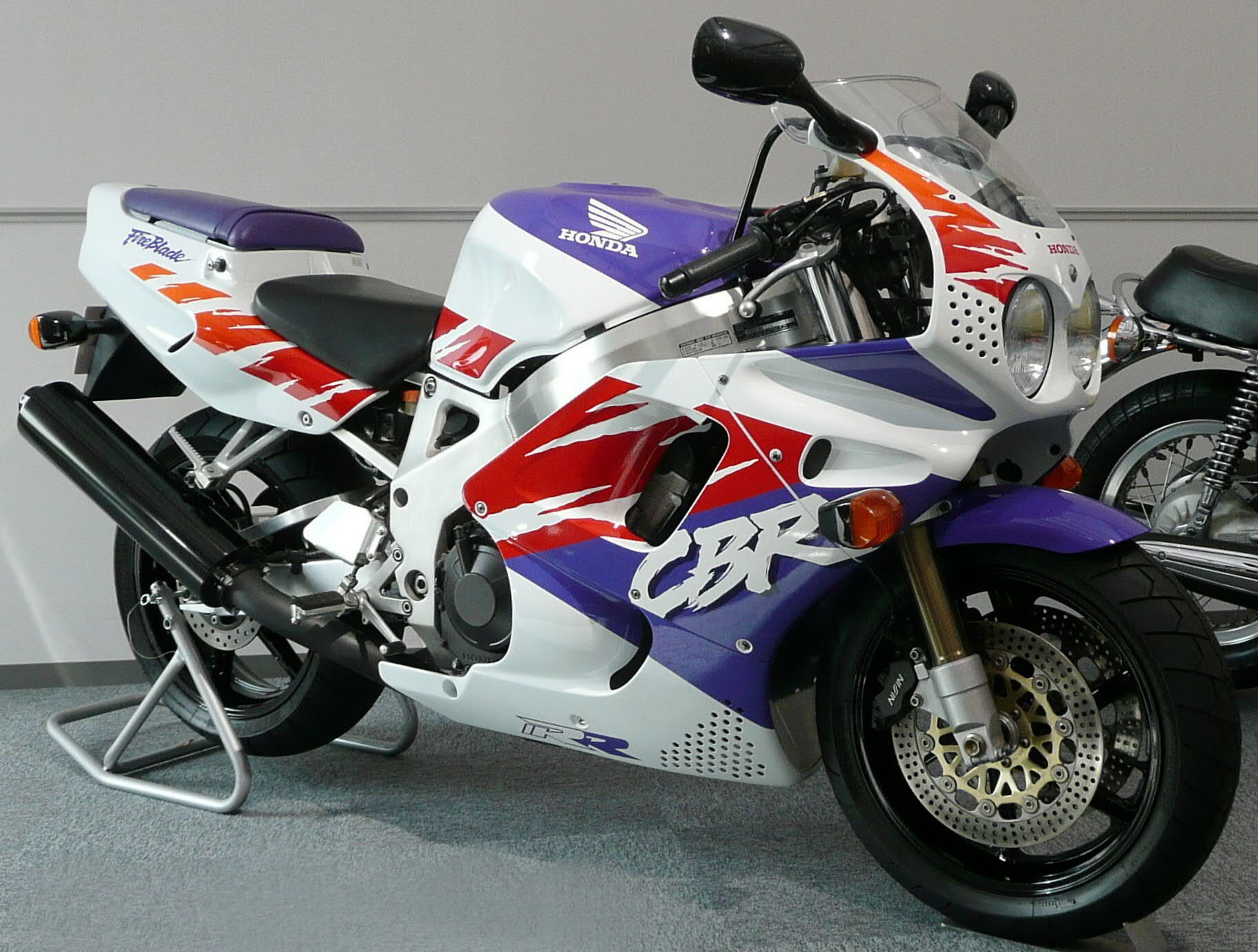
- 1992 CBR900RR
- Manufacturer: Honda
- Also called: Fireblade
- Production: 1992–2003
- Successor: CBR1000RR
- Class: Sport bike
- Related: Honda CBR600RR; Honda CBR1000RR; Honda CB900F

The Honda CBR900RR, or Fireblade in some countries, is a 900 cc (55 cu in) sport bike, part of the CBR series introduced in 1992 by Honda. It was the first of a series of large-displacement Honda models to carry the RR suffix. The development of the first generation CBR900RR was led by Tadao Baba.

== History ==
=== CBR900RR (893cc) SC28 ===
The first generation CBR900RR was introduced in 1992 with an 893 cc (54.5 cu in) inline-four engine. It set a precedent for lightweight in the superbike class, being much lighter than other large-displacement bikes of the time. The CBR900RR was based on an advanced research stage model known within Honda as the "CBR750RR". With the objective of equaling the acceleration of competitors’ flagship sport bikes, Honda increased the stroke of its inline 4-cylinder 750 cc engine and thus raised displacement to 893cc. Complementing its power performance was the bike's dry weight of just 185 kg, wheelbase of 1,405 mm, and a body almost identical to that of the advanced research stage model. At 205 kg (453 lb) wet weight, it was by just 1.8 kg (4 lb) heavier than the CBR600F2, while the next-lightest over-750cc machine, the Yamaha FZR1000, was heavier by 34 kg (76 lb).

Changes for the 1994 model comprise a new shift-drum to improve notchy gear shifts. The second-generation CBR900RR, which debuted in 1995, incorporated changes in damping rates and spring rates. The front fork was upgraded with a compression adjuster. The upper cowl stay went from steel to aluminum, and the cylinder head cover went from aluminum to magnesium. The styling of the bike also became more aggressive: The independent dual lights became irregular-shaped multi-reflector lights known as "fox eyes" set further back and covered to improve aerodynamics, and the bike had fewer of the RR's unique fairing "speed" holes. The footpegs were firmer and slimmer like that of the RC45 and the reversed pedal on the original was replaced with a shift linkage. Instead of measuring speed from the front wheel, the speed is measured from the countershaft sprocket with an electronic speedometer.

=== CBR900RR (919cc) SC33 ===
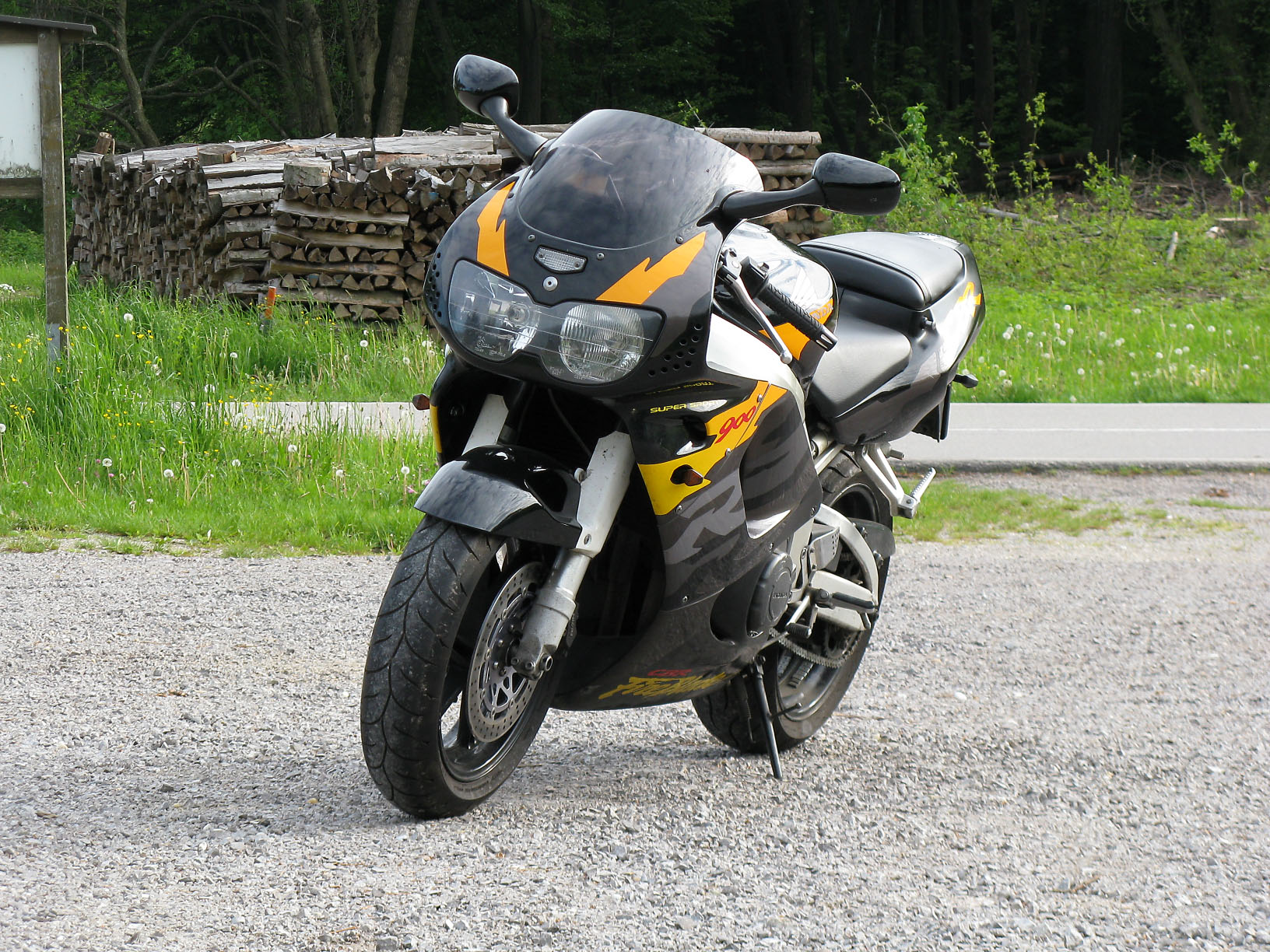
Honda CBR 919 RR SC33 with the Original "Foxeye" Headlights

1996 brought major changes to the CBR900RR with the third generation CBR900RR. To optimize rigidity Honda revised the suspension and chassis. Larger thinner-walled extrusions for more torsional rigidity were used in the swingarm and frame, revised shock and fork internals, and 5 mm (0.2 in) raised swingarm pivot. The handlebars were raised by 10 mm (0.4 in) and swept back by five degrees to improve the riding position. A 1 mm (0.04 in) bore increase raised the engine displacement to 919 cc (56.1 cu in). Other revisions included a smaller alternator, the addition of a throttle position sensor, extra clutch plates, and a larger exhaust.

The only changes for the 1997 model were graphics and colour options.

In 1998, Honda continued subtle refinements in the fourth generation CBR900RR's chassis. It got a stiffer frame more like the original, offset on the triple clamp reduced by 5 mm (0.2 in). It received a redesigned fairing, a new dual-reflector headlight design, new windscreen, mirrors, and rear cowl. The brakes got larger rotors on the front and new calipers and ergonomics were revised with raised footpegs. The engine got revised with 80 percent new internals in an effort to reduce friction and weight. Cylinders bore got an aluminum composites treatment and new pistons. A new instrument cluster includes an LCD tachometer and speedometer, and LCD readouts for temperature, odometer and two tripmeters. It also got a larger radiator and a new exhaust header in stainless steel.

=== CBR929RR (929cc) SC44 ===
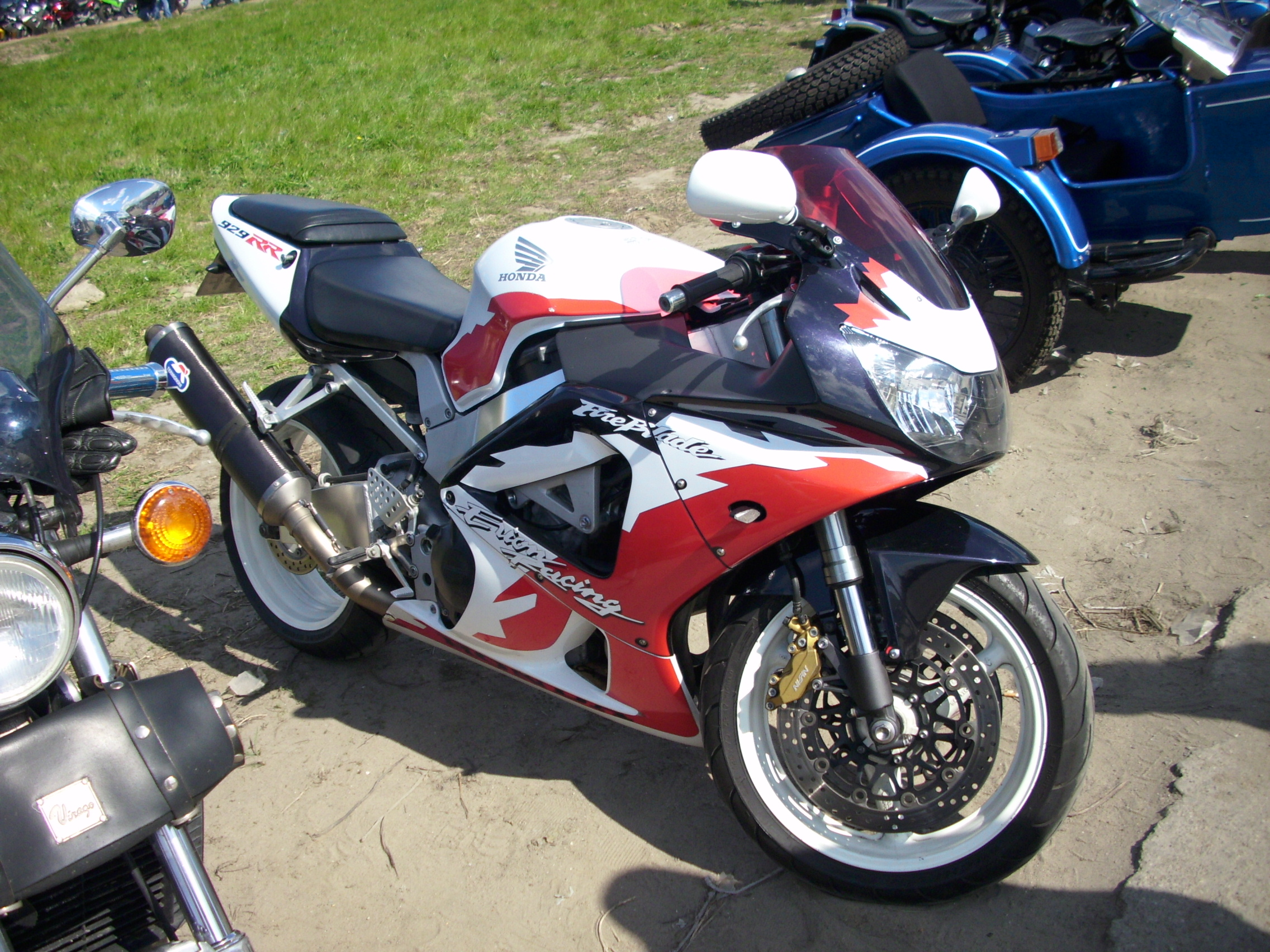
2000 CBR929RR

The fifth-generation CBR900RR, or CBR929RR in North America, was introduced in 2000. It has a completely new 929 cc (56.7 cu in) engine, more oversquare with lighter internals. The engine also featured fuel injection and larger valves set at a narrower angle. A new all-titanium exhaust system equipped with HTEV was incorporated. The swingarm is mounted to the engine with bracing under the engine. Larger front disk rotors 330 mm mounted were also fitted and the wheel diameter was increased from 16 inches to 17 inches. The new front fork now used upside-down construction.

=== CBR954RR (954cc) SC50 ===
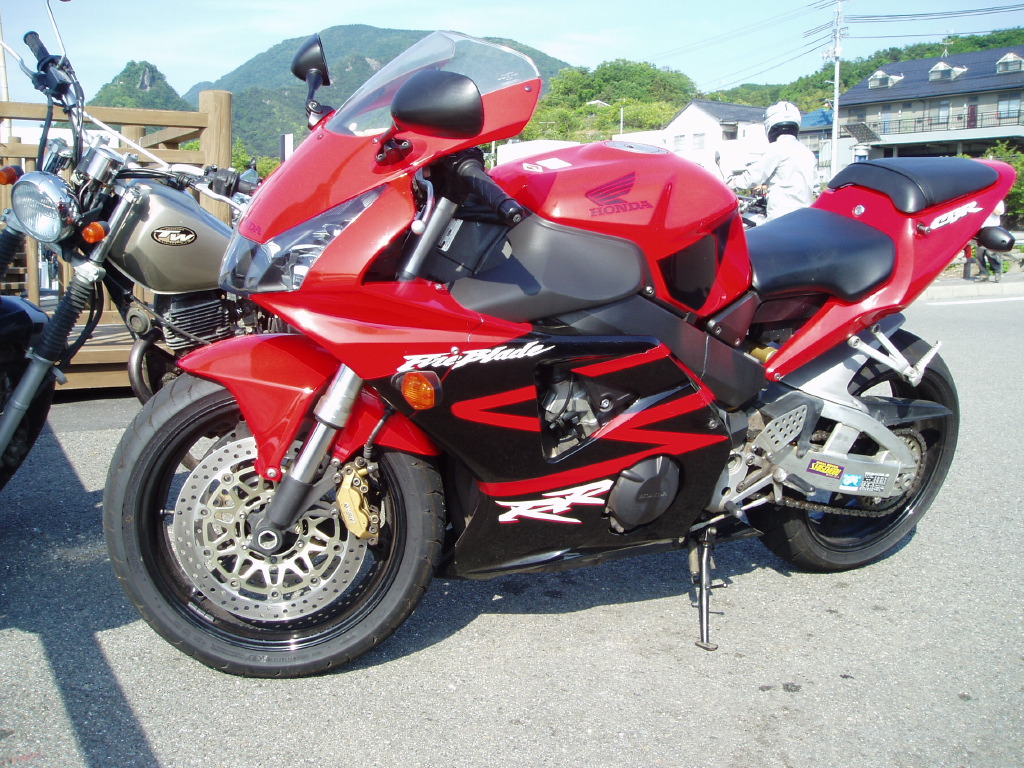
2002 CBR954RR

The sixth generation CBR900RR, or CBR954RR in North America and Japan, was introduced in 2002. The cylinder bore was enlarged from 74 to 75 mm (2.9 to 3.0 in), increasing capacity to 954 cc (58.2 cu in). Larger fuel injectors, larger radiator, re-mapped electronic fuel injection, and a more powerful ECU were added. The restyled bodywork and fairings gave a sleeker look. The frame as well as the swingarm were strengthened, and the footpegs raised to allow for greater lean angles. Front disc size increased to 330 mm. Dry weight was reduced to 168 kg (370 lb) and the wet weight to 195 kg (430 lb). Power at the rear wheel is 135.8 hp (101.3 kW) and 70.9 lb⋅ft (96.1 N⋅m) torque.

John McGuinness won the Macau Grand Prix in 2001 riding a CBR954RR.

=== Successor ===
The CBR900RR was replaced by the CBR1000RR in 2004.

== In culture ==
The CBR900RR is a central subject of Brigitte Giraud's prizewinning autobiographical novel Vivre vite (Live Fast) (2022), which explores the death of Giraud's husband while riding one.

== Specifications ==
All specifications are manufacturer claimed unless specified.

Model	CBR900RR (SC28) 1st gen	CBR900RR (SC28) 2nd gen	CBR919RR (SC33) 3rd & 4th gen	CBR929RR (SC44) 5th gen	CBR954RR (SC50) 6th gen
Years	1992–1993	1994–1995	1996-1997&1998-1999	2000–2001	2002–2003
Engine displacement	893 cc (54.5 cu in)		919 cc (56.1 cu in)	929 cc (56.7 cu in)	954 cc (58.2 cu in)
Engine type	Inline-4				
Stroke	4				
Compression	11:1		11.1:1	11.3:1	11.5:1
Bore x stroke	70.0 mm × 58.0 mm (2.76 in × 2.28 in)		71.0 mm × 58.0 mm (2.80 in × 2.28 in)	74.0 mm × 54.0 mm (2.91 in × 2.13 in)	75.0 mm × 54.0 mm (2.95 in × 2.13 in)
Fuel control	4x Keihin CV carbs		4x 38 mm Keihin CV carbs	PGM-FI (fuel injection) w/ automatic choke	
Cooling system	Liquid Cooling				
Gearbox	6-speed constant-mesh sequential manual				
Final drive	chain		#525 O-Ring Sealed Chain	#530 O-Ring Sealed Chain	
Dry weight	185 kg (408 lb)	180 kg (400 lb)		172 kg (379 lb)	168 kg (370 lb)
Seat height	810 mm (32 in)			815 mm (32.1 in)	815 mm (32.1 in)
Wheelbase	1,405 mm (55.3 in)			1,390 mm (55 in)	1,400 mm (55 in)
Front suspension travel	120 mm (4.7 in)				
Rear suspension travel	135 mm (5.3 in)				
Front tyre	130/70-ZR16			120/70-ZR17	
Rear tyre	180/55-ZR17				
Front brakes	Dual disc, 296 mm (11.7 in)		Dual disc, 298 mm (11.7 in) (96–97); 310 mm (12 in) (98–99)	Dual disc, 330 mm (13 in)	
Rear brakes	Single disc, 220 mm (8.7 in)				
Fuel capacity	18 L (4.0 imp gal; 4.8 US gal)		18 L (4.0 imp gal; 4.8 US gal) with 2 L (0.44 imp gal; 0.53 US gal) reserve	18 L (4.0 imp gal; 4.8 US gal) with 3.4 L (0.75 imp gal; 0.90 US gal) reserve	
Performance
Max. Power Output (at the crankshaft)	121 hp (90 kW) @ 10,500 rpm	122 hp (91 kW) @ 10,500 rpm	130 hp (97 kW) @ 10,500 rpm	152 hp (113 kW) @ 11,500 rpm	154 hp (115 kW) @ 11,250 rpm
