= Honda CBR1000F =

Sport touring motorcycle

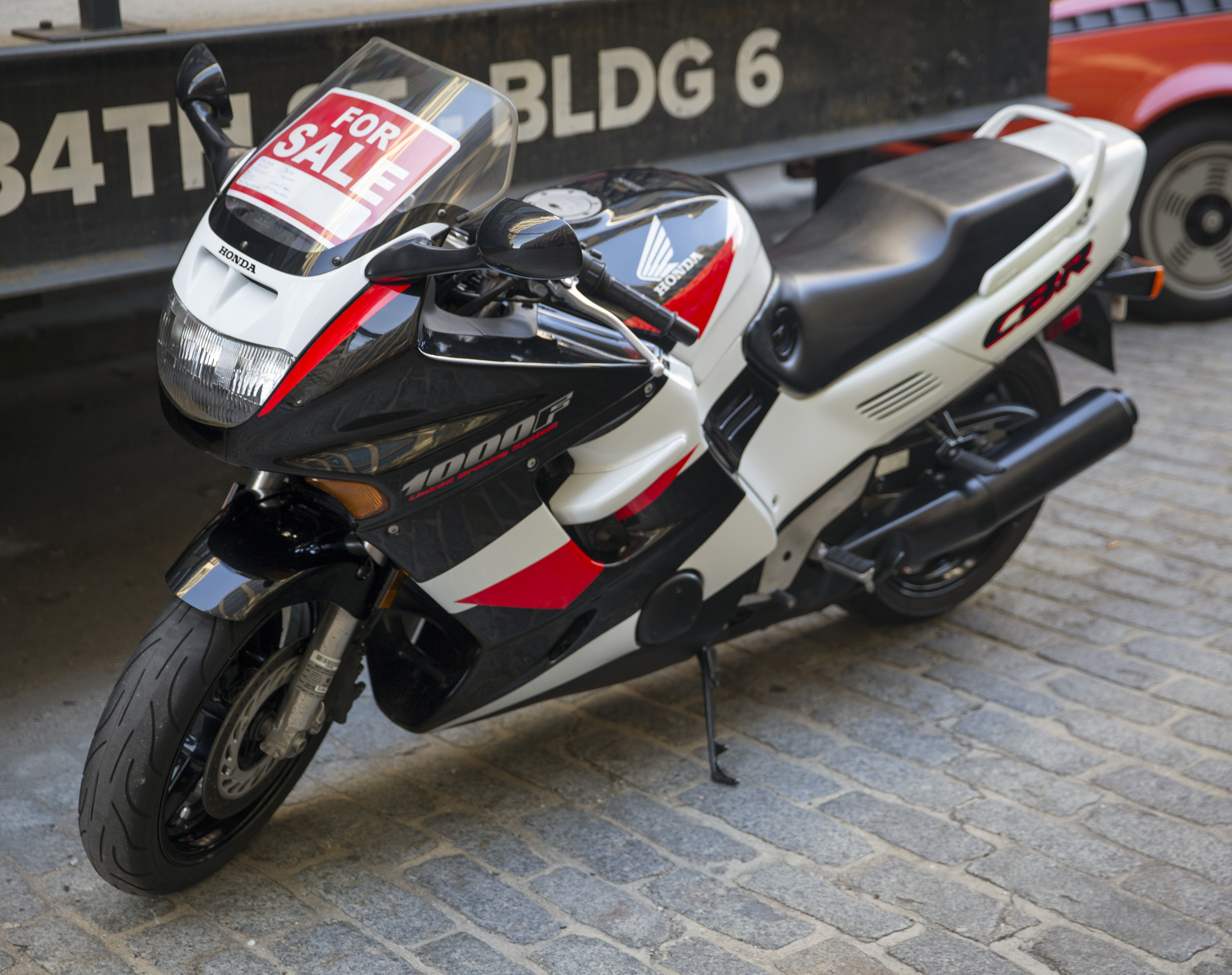
- Manufacturer: Honda
- Also called: Hurricane
- Production: 1987–1996 (USA); 1987–1999
- Successor: Honda CBR1100XX
- Class: Sport touring
- Engine: 998 cc (60.9 cu in) liquid-cooled 4-stroke 16-valve DOHC inline-four
- Top speed: 248 km/h (154 mph)
- Power: 135 hp (101 kW); 84.3 kW (113.1 hp) (rear wheel) at 9250 rpm
- Torque: 94.1 N⋅m (69.4 ft⋅lb) (rear wheel) at 6500 rpm
- Transmission: 6-speed constant mesh, chain final drive
- Frame type: Steel twin-spar
- Suspension: Front: Conventional 41 mm (1.6 in) telescopic fork, air-assisted; Rear: Swingarm, 6-way preload adjustable and 3-way rebound adjustable monoshock with Pro-Link
- Brakes: Front: Dual 296 mm (11.7 in) discs with dual 3-piston Nissin calipers Rear: Single 256 mm (10.1 in) disc with a 3-piston Nissin caliper
- Tires: Front: 120/70-17; Rear: 170/60-17
- Rake, trail: 27°, 4.3 in (110 mm)
- Wheelbase: 1,500 mm (59.1 in)
- Dimensions: L: 2,240 mm (88.0 in); W: 740 mm (29.1 in); H: 1,210 mm (47.8 in)
- Seat height: 780 mm (30.7 in)
- Weight: 232 kg (511 lb) (dry); 256 kg (564 lb) (wet)
- Fuel capacity: 22.0 L; 4.84 imp gal (5.81 US gal)
- Fuel consumption: 5.70 L/100 km; 49.6 mpg_{‑imp} (41.3 mpg_{‑US})
- Related: Honda CBR600F Hurricane; Honda CBR750 Super Aero

The Honda CBR1000F Hurricane is a sport touring motorcycle, part of the CBR series manufactured by Honda from 1987 to 1996 in the United States and from 1987 to 1999 in the rest of the world. It is powered by a liquid-cooled, DOHC, 998 cc (60.9 cu in), 16-valve inline-four engine. The CBR1000F, along with the CBR750F and CBR600F, was Honda's first inline four-cylinder, fully-faired sport bike.

== History ==
Manufactured from 1987 to 1996 in the U.S., and to late 1999 in the rest of the world, the Hurricane went through only three major revisions. In 1989, the bike received a cosmetic makeover with a complete redesign of the front fairing. Honda made improvements to the bike's front suspension, and added larger tires to help with the bike's heavy weight and to accommodate radial tires. Improvements were also added to the bike's cam chain tensioner in an attempt to remove the annoying cam chain rattle some riders had reported. The 1989 model also had its power slightly increased, and it gained weight.

In 1992, the bike's looks were overhauled with a more streamlined and modern-looking bodywork. The biggest change was the introduction of DCBS, Honda's dual combined braking system. Honda's first street motorcycle with a combined braking system (then called Unified Braking) was the 1983 Gold Wing GL1100. This system was derived from a 1970s RCB1000 world endurance race bike. The DCBS system was introduced to assist rider braking. The front brake lever operates two of the three pistons on the front calipers but also proportionally applies pressure to one piston of the rear brake caliper, while using the rear brake will engage one piston in front calipers and two pistons on the rear. Since then DCBS has evolved into a very popular addition to many Honda touring motorcycles. No major changes were made after 1992. A touring model was briefly launched that offered a larger screen and hard panniers.

The CBR was weighed by Cycle World at 232 kg (511 lb) tank empty and 256 kg (564 lb) wet for California model. Honda claims a dry weight of 232 kg (511 lb), and 256 kg (564 lb) wet. The seat is 780 mm (31 in) high and the wheelbase is 1,505 mm (59.3 in). The engine is housed in a steel box section perimeter frame, air-assisted 41 mm telescopic front forks and an adjustable monoshock at the rear. The front brakes are twin 296 mm discs using three piston Nissin calipers on later models (two piston calipers 1987–88), the rear is a single 256 mm disc, and DCBS are used on all models after 1992.

== Engine ==
The CBR's engine went largely unchanged throughout its history. It uses the standard Honda inline four-cylinder 998 cc, four-stroke, DOHC, 16-valve, liquid-cooled power plant running four 38 mm CV carburetors and has a bore and stroke of 77 mm × 53.6 mm (3.03 in × 2.11 in). It produces 135 bhp (101 kW) at 8600 rpm and 69.4 ft⋅lb (94.1 N⋅m) (rear wheel) of torque at 6500 rpm.

It had a 0 to 1/4 mi (0.00 to 0.40 km) acceleration of 11.19 seconds at 121.24 mph (195.12 km/h). The fuel tank holds 22 litres (4.8 imp gal; 5.8 US gal).

== Discontinuation ==
In 1992, Honda introduced the Supersport series with the Tadao Baba developed Fireblade, which took sales from the heavier CBR1000F.

The model was hence discontinued in the US from 1996 as the CBR1100XX was released, but continued to sell in Asian and European markets until Honda finally ended its run in late 1999.

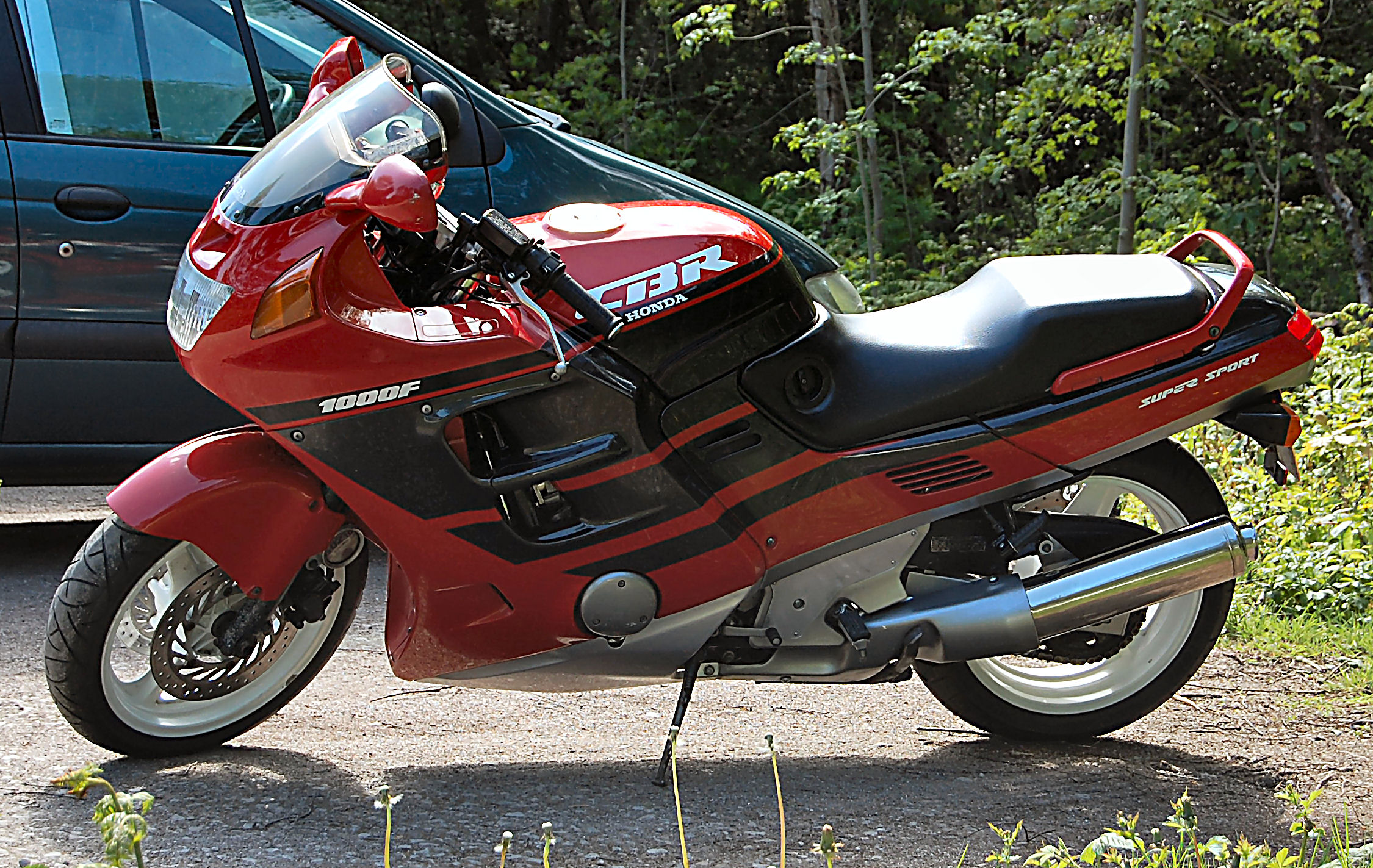
Honda CBR1000F
