= Honda Blackbird =

Honda CBR1100XX Super Blackbird
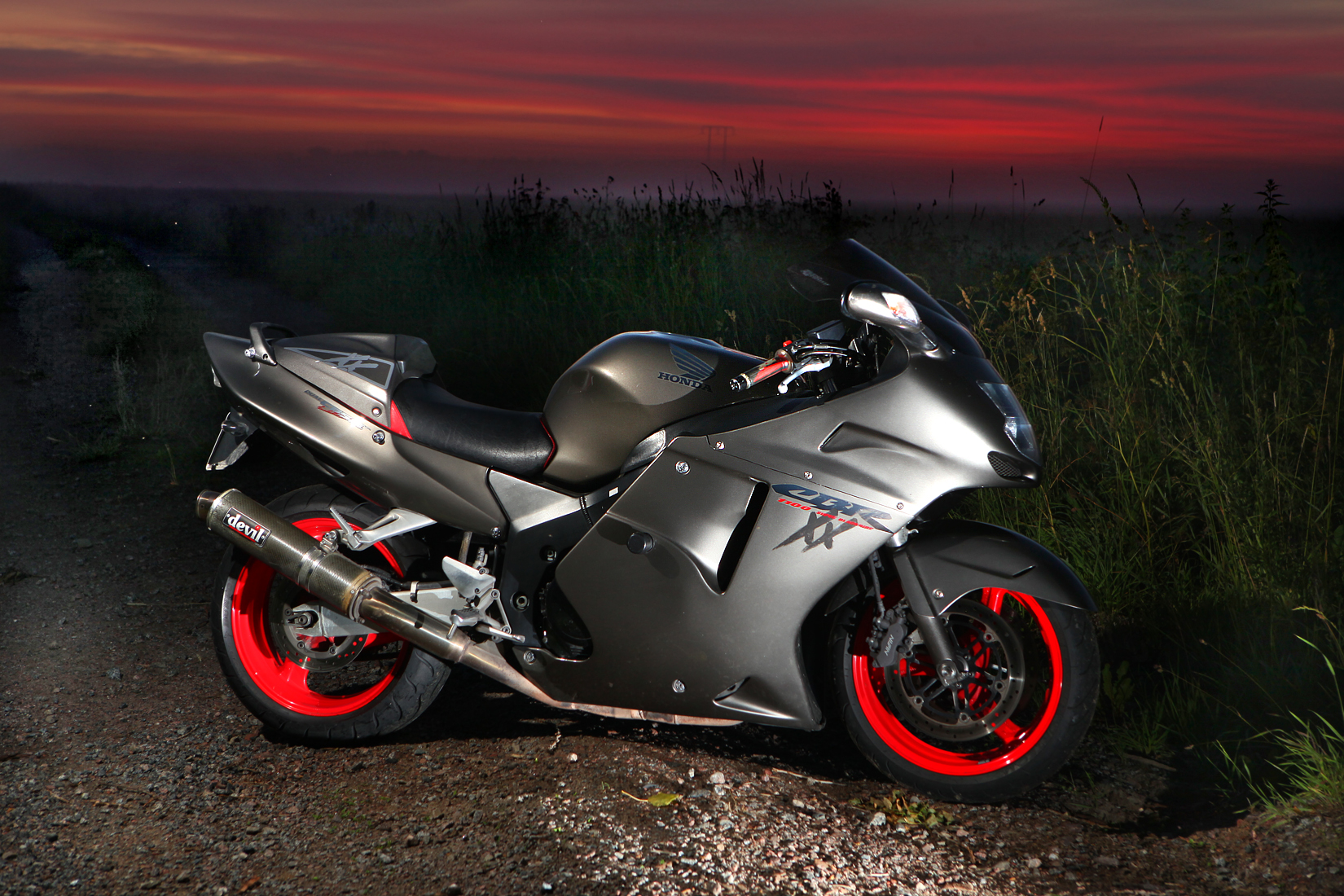
- Manufacturer: Honda
- Production: 1996–2007
- Predecessor: Honda CBR1000F
- Class: Sport bike
- Engine: 1,137 cc (69.4 cu in) liquid-cooled 4-stroke 16-valve DOHC inline-four
- Bore / stroke: 79.0 mm × 58.0 mm (3.1 in × 2.3 in)
- Compression ratio: 11.0:1
- Top speed: 1997: 170 mph (270 km/h); 1999: 174 mph (280 km/h), 176 mph (283 km/h), 177 mph (285 km/h)
- Power: 164 hp (122 kW) @ 9,500 rpm
- Torque: 126 N⋅m (93 lbf⋅ft) @ 7,500 rpm
- Ignition type: Computer-controlled digital with three-dimensional mapping
- Transmission: Close-ratio 6-speed sequential manual Final drive: #530 O-ring sealed chain
- Suspension: Front: 43 mm HMAS cartridge-type fork, 120 mm travel Rear: Pro-Link HMAS with gas-charged damper, rebound adjustable 120 mm travel
- Brakes: Dual combined braking system Front: Three-piston caliper with dual 310 mm (12.2 in) discs Rear: Three-piston caliper with single 256 mm (10.1 in) disc
- Tires: Front: 120/70 ZR17; Rear: 180/55 ZR17
- Rake, trail: 25°, 99 mm (3.9 in)
- Wheelbase: 1,490 mm (58.7 in)
- Dimensions: L: 2,160 mm (85.0 in); W: 720 mm (28.3 in); H: 1,170 mm (46.1 in)
- Seat height: 810 mm (31.9 in)
- Weight: 1997: 492 lb (223 kg); 1999: 496 lb (225 kg) (dry); 1997: 556 lb (252 kg); 1999 563 lb (255 kg) (wet)
- Fuel capacity: 23.0 L (5.1 imp gal; 6.1 US gal) (including the 4 L reserve)
- Fuel consumption: 39 mpg_{‑US} (6.0 L/100 km; 47 mpg_{‑imp})
- Related: Honda X11

The Honda CBR1100XX Super Blackbird (model code SC35) is a sport bike, part of the CBR series made by Honda from 1996 to 2007. The bike was developed to challenge the Kawasaki Ninja ZX-11 as the world's fastest production motorcycle, and Honda succeeded with a top speed of 177 mph (285 km/h). Two years later the title passed to the Suzuki Hayabusa, which reached 193 mph (311 km/h). The Blackbird is named after the Lockheed SR-71, also a speed record holder.

It has the largest-displacement engine in Honda's CBR range of motorcycles.

== Development ==
In the mid-1990s, Honda was determined to produce the world's fastest production motorcycle and to take over the associated bragging rights and marketing impact, at the time held by Kawasaki's Ninja ZX11. This led to the creation of the CBR1100XX Super Blackbird. The Blackbird name is a nod to the Lockheed SR-71 aircraft, the world's fastest production aircraft.

In the February 1997 issue of Sport Rider magazine, the CBR1100XX was tested at a top speed of 178.5 mph (287.3 km/h), compared with 175 mph (281.6 km/h) for the ZX-11. Its supremacy over the ZX-11 was confirmed in April 2007 by Motorcycle Consumer News, although the speeds achieved were slightly lower and the margin was narrower.

In 1999, the Suzuki Hayabusa overtook the CBR1100XX. It was listed in the 2000 Millennium Edition of Guinness World Records as the world's fastest production bike with a top speed of 194 mph (312 km/h) Hayabusa is the Japanese term for the Peregrine Falcon, a species of raptor which preys on blackbirds.

Records
Preceded by Kawasaki Ninja ZX-11	Fastest production motorcycle 1996–1999	Succeeded by Suzuki Hayabusa
