= Honda Fireblade =

The Honda Fireblade is a family of sport motorcycles manufactured by Honda since 1992. The first model was designed by Tadao Baba.

- CBR900RR, 1992–1995
  - CBR919RR, 1996–1999
  - CBR929RR, 2000–2001
  - CBR954RR, 2002–2003
- CBR1000RR, 2004–present
  - CBR1000RR-R, 2020–present
