= Honda CBR series =

Series of Honda sport bikes

The Honda CBR models are a series of Honda sport bikes introduced in 1983. They were among the earliest all-enclosed motorcycles. With the exception of the single-cylinder CBR125R, CBR150R, CBR250R, and CBR300R, all CBR motorcycles have inline engines.

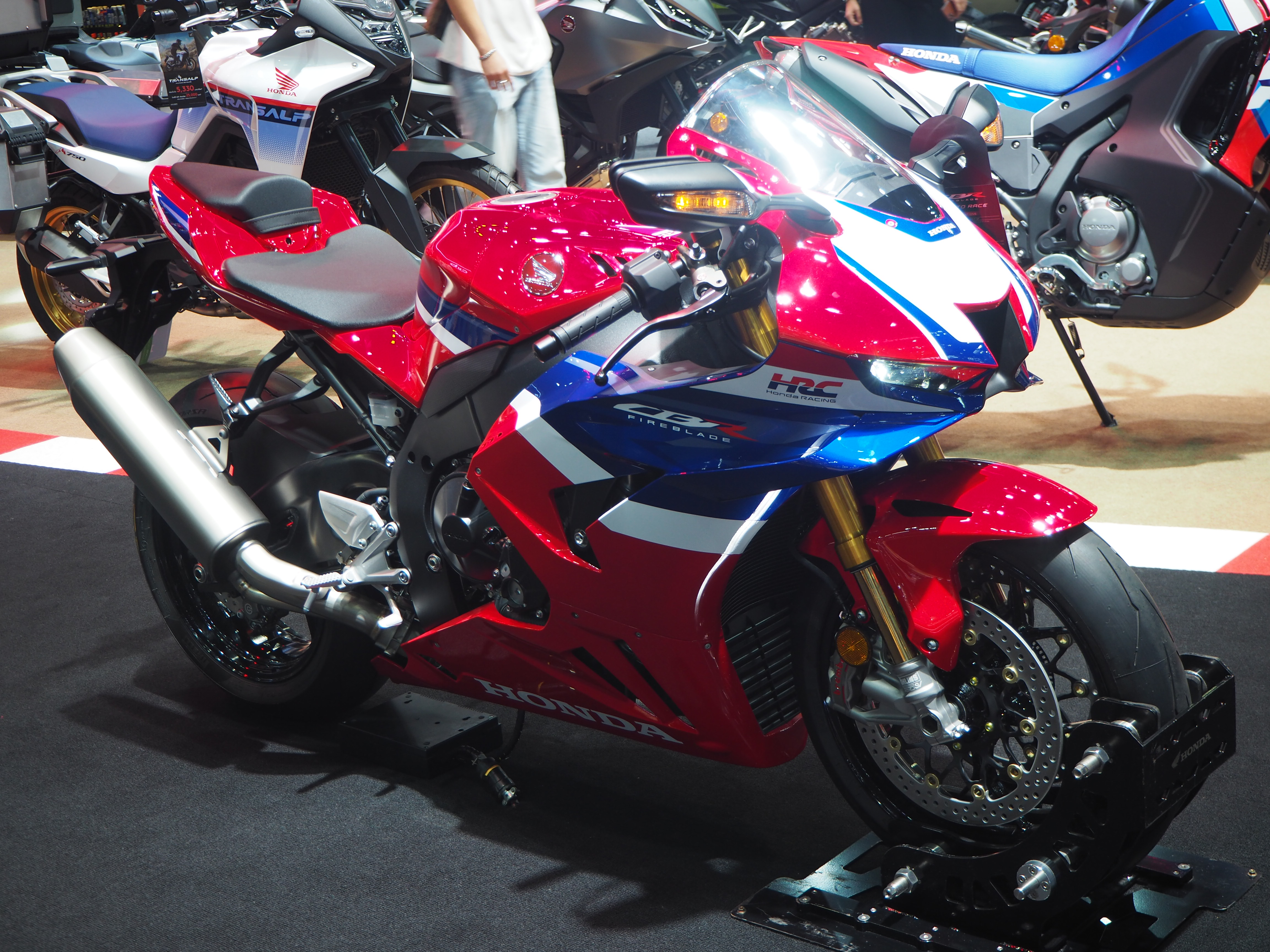
2024 Honda CBR1000RR-R Fireblade SP (SC82)

== Single-cylinder ==
- CBR125R (2004–2016)
- CBR150R (2002–present)
- CBR250R (2011–2023)
- CBR300R (2015–2023)

== Inline-twin ==
- CBR250RR (2017–present)
- CBR450SR Aero Sport (1989–1994)
- CBR400R (2013–present)
- CBR500R (2013–present)

== Inline-four ==
- CBR250/250R/250RR (1986–2001)
- CBR400F/400R/400RR (1983–1994)
- CBR400R Four (2026–present)
- CBR500F (1986–1993)
- CBR500R Four (2025–present)
- CBR600F Hurricane/600F2/600F3/600F4/600F4i (1987–2006)
  - CBR600F (2011–2013)
- CBR600RR (2003–present)
- CBR650F/650R (2014–present)
- CBR750 Super Aero (1987–1988)
- CBR900RR Fireblade (893 cc: 1992–1995; 919 cc: 1996–1999)
  - CBR929RR Fireblade (2000–2001)
  - CBR954RR Fireblade (2002–2003)
- CBR1000RR Fireblade (2004–2019)
  - CBR1000RR-R Fireblade SP (2020–present)
- CBR1000F Hurricane (1987–1999)
- CBR1100XX Super Blackbird (1996–2007)

== See also ==
- Honda CB series
