= Tadao Baba =

Japanese motorcycle designer

- Born: 1944 (age 81–82)
- Engineering career
- Significant design: Honda Fireblade

Tadao Baba (馬場忠雄) is a retired Japanese motorcycle engineer, the original designer of the Honda Fireblade.

== Career ==
Baba joined Honda Motorcycles from high school in 1962, aged 18 — the company itself was only 14 years old. Working in the machinery section, he made crankcases and cylinder heads for Honda's Honda CB72 and Honda CB77. At age 20, Baba moved to Honda's R&D department, which is where he spent the rest of his career until retiring in 2004. He continued as a consultant until 2009.

== Total Control ==
In the late 1980s, sports motorcycles were very fast, with magazines rating bikes on their top speed. To house a 1000cc engine the bikes became heavy, while to ensure the stability of the bikes at high speed, the chassis became longer. The result was a series of fast bikes, which didn't handle in corners. Baba states this as the reason which inspired him to design the FireBlade:

It was in 1989 and I was riding with a group of Honda engineers on some of the competitors' machines. There was a Suzuki GSX-R1100, a Yamaha FZR1000 and our own Honda CBR1000F. I was thinking, 'How can these be called sports bikes when they are so very big and heavy?' They didn't deserve the name.

Baba began developing a new concept in sports motorcycles under the title "Total Control," based on the fundamentals of fun to ride, easy to control.

The first bike developed under Total Control was the Honda CBR750RR around a 750cc engine, but Honda already had the Honda VFR in that segment; the idea to develop the bike in the 1000cc market was also dismissed, with the existing Honda CBR1000F. Instead Baba proposed to develop Total Control around the chassis dimensions of a 750, using the same base motor and its bore, but with an increase in stroke to create an 893cc engine, keeping it closer and hence performance-competitive with the existing 1000cc bikes.

After winning over the Honda Marketing team who were sceptical about creating a new class of motorcycle, the new 900cc class was created with one bike from all manufacturers globally in the class. This created both a marketing risk, but also a technological advantage should the class take off. The result of the original FireBlade in 1992 on the market, which was 90 pounds (41 kg) lighter than the nearest competitor, was that it sold so many units by capturing sales from both the tourer and existing sports bike ranges. This resulted the competition not catching up until Yamaha created the lighter 1000cc R1 in 1998, which created the modern 1000cc Supersports category.

== Personal life ==
Married, Baba has a reputation amongst Honda test riders and media journalists as a smoker who often crashes his bikes, although he claims to have only ever crashed four FireBlades.
