= Honda CBR600F =

Sport bike

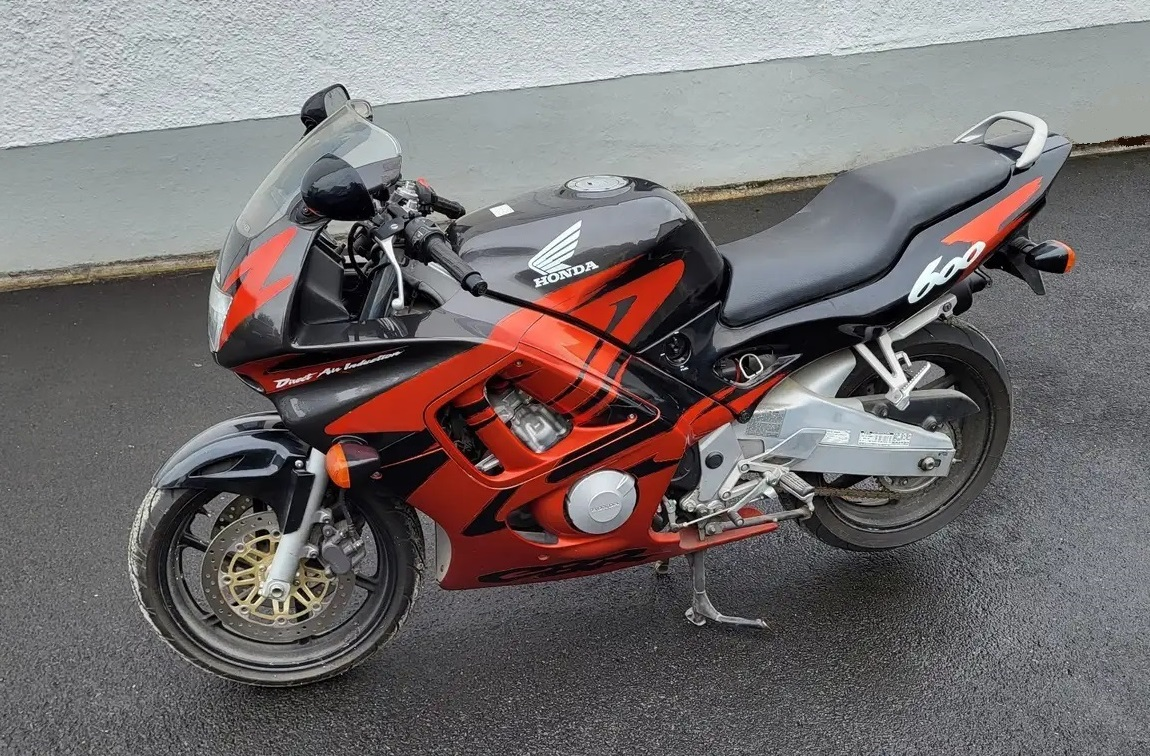
- Honda CBR600F Hurricane /Honda CBR600F2 (for UK
- Manufacturer: Honda
- Also called: Honda Hurricane (US, 1987–1990)
- Production: 1987–2006; 2011–2013
- Predecessor: Honda VF500F
- Successor: Honda CBR600RR (for CBR600F4i); Honda CBR650F (for 2011 CBR600F)
- Class: Sport bike
- Related: Honda CBR600RR

The Honda CBR600F is a CBR series 600 cubic centimetres (36.6 cubic inches) inline four-cylinder sport bike motorcycle made by Honda Motorcycles. The first model of the CBR600F was sold from 1987 to 1990 and is known in the US as the Hurricane. In Austria and Mexico, a smaller version, called CBR500F, was offered. The subsequent models are designated as CBR600F2, F3, F4, and F4i respectively. In 2011, Honda released a more modern model with the same name.

The original CBR600F, along with the CBR750F and CBR1000F were Honda's first inline four-cylinder, fully-faired sport bikes. The style was said to be influenced by a brief European trend toward a smooth and completely enclosed fairing such as in the Ducati Paso.

== History ==
=== CBR600F2 (1991–1994) ===
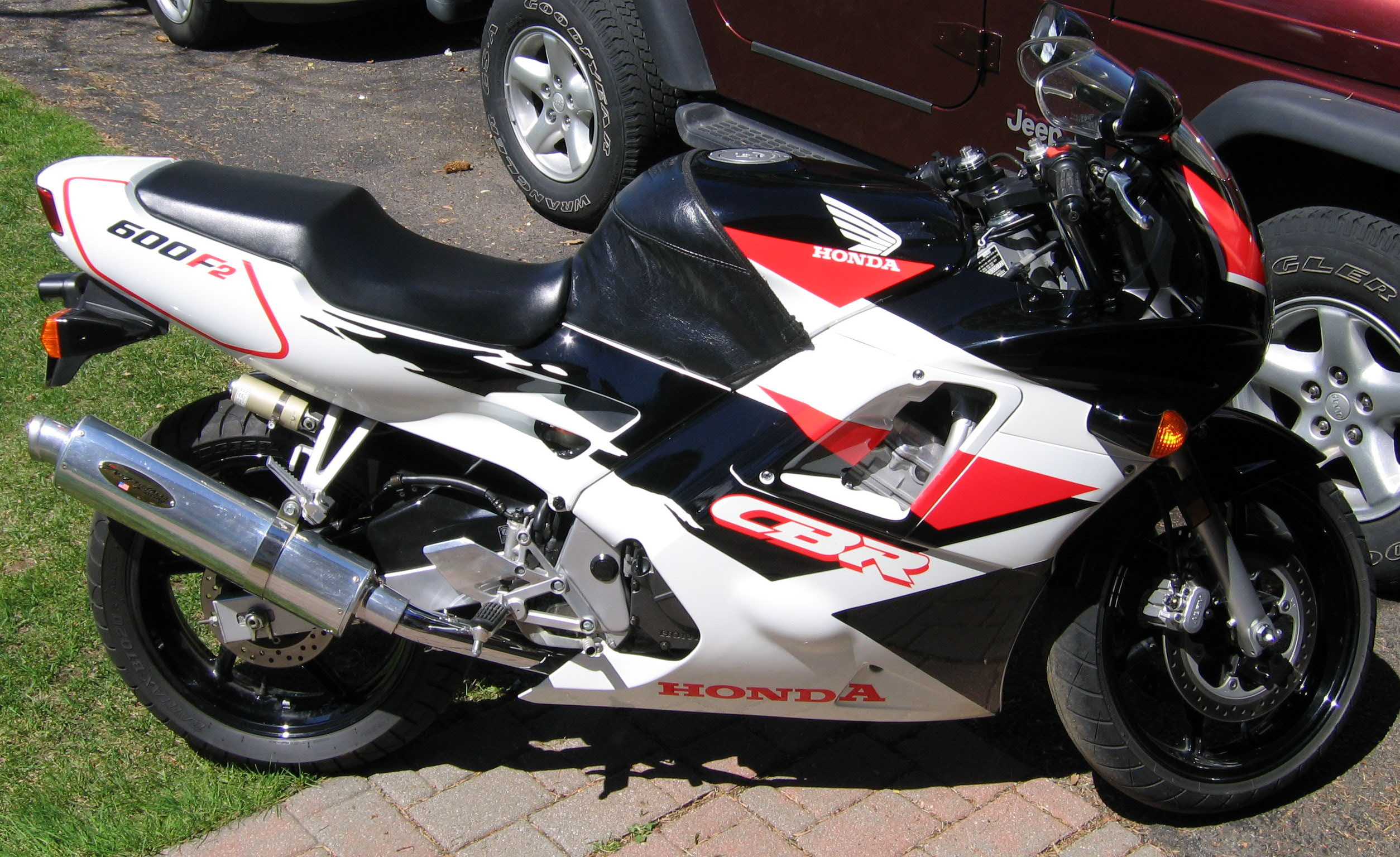
Honda CBR600F2

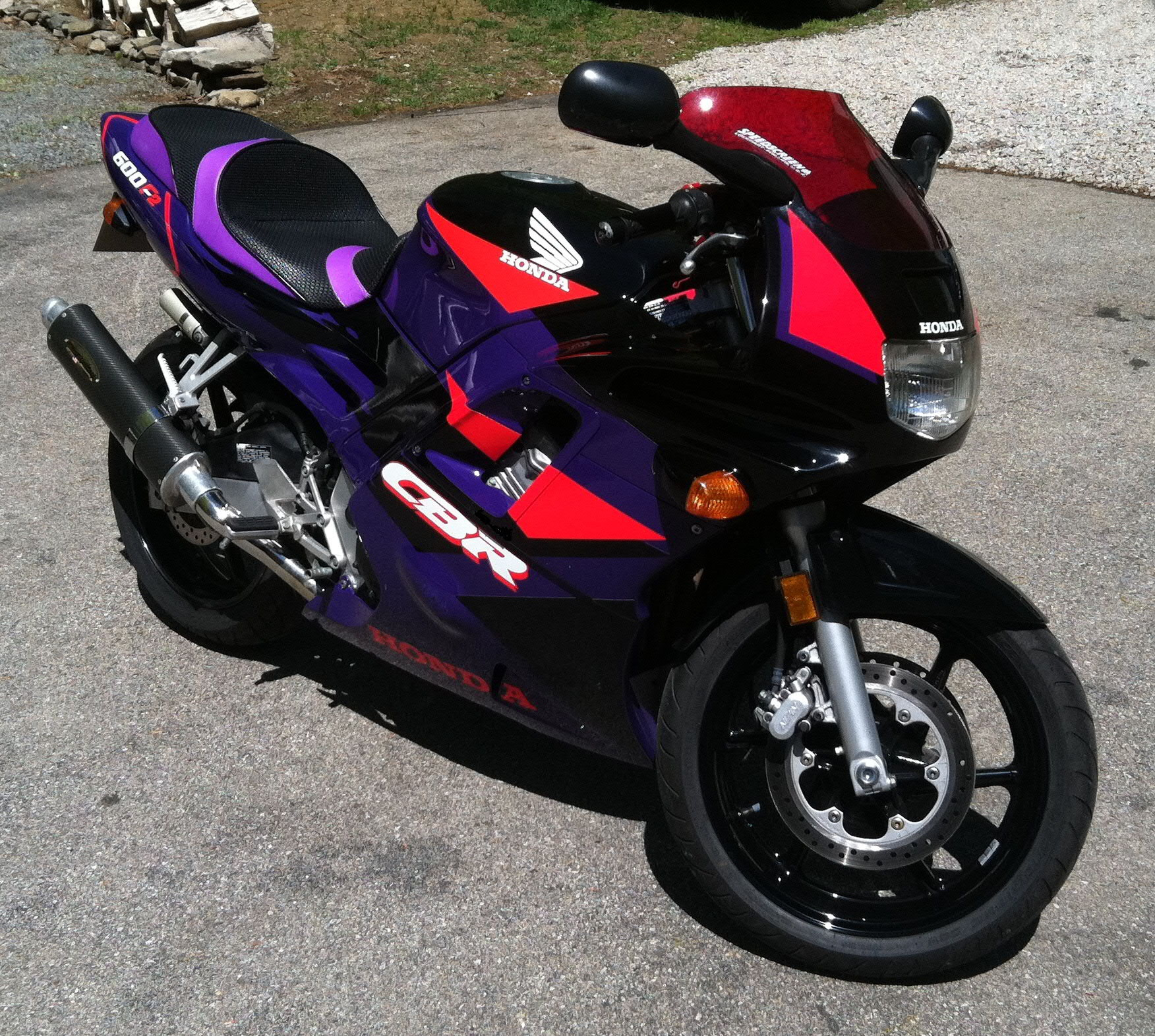
1994 Honda CBR600F2

The CBR600F2 was produced from 1991 to 1994. It was introduced to replace the original CBR600F Hurricane, and for its time, was considered one of Honda's most modern and innovative sport bikes. Development of the CBR600F2 began in early 1989. Hurricane LPL Ishikawa led the development of the new motorcycle, known internally as MV9 but also called the F2, an alphanumeric that led to its official name: CBR600F2.

The F2's development began with meetings to discuss concepts and sketches for the new motorcycle. A few months later, an F2 prototype was produced. Painted black, the bike looked faster and sleeker than the more blocky first generation bike, and test results were superior: few motorcycles in the 1990s had the performance ability of the F2.

=== CBR600F3 (1995–1998) ===
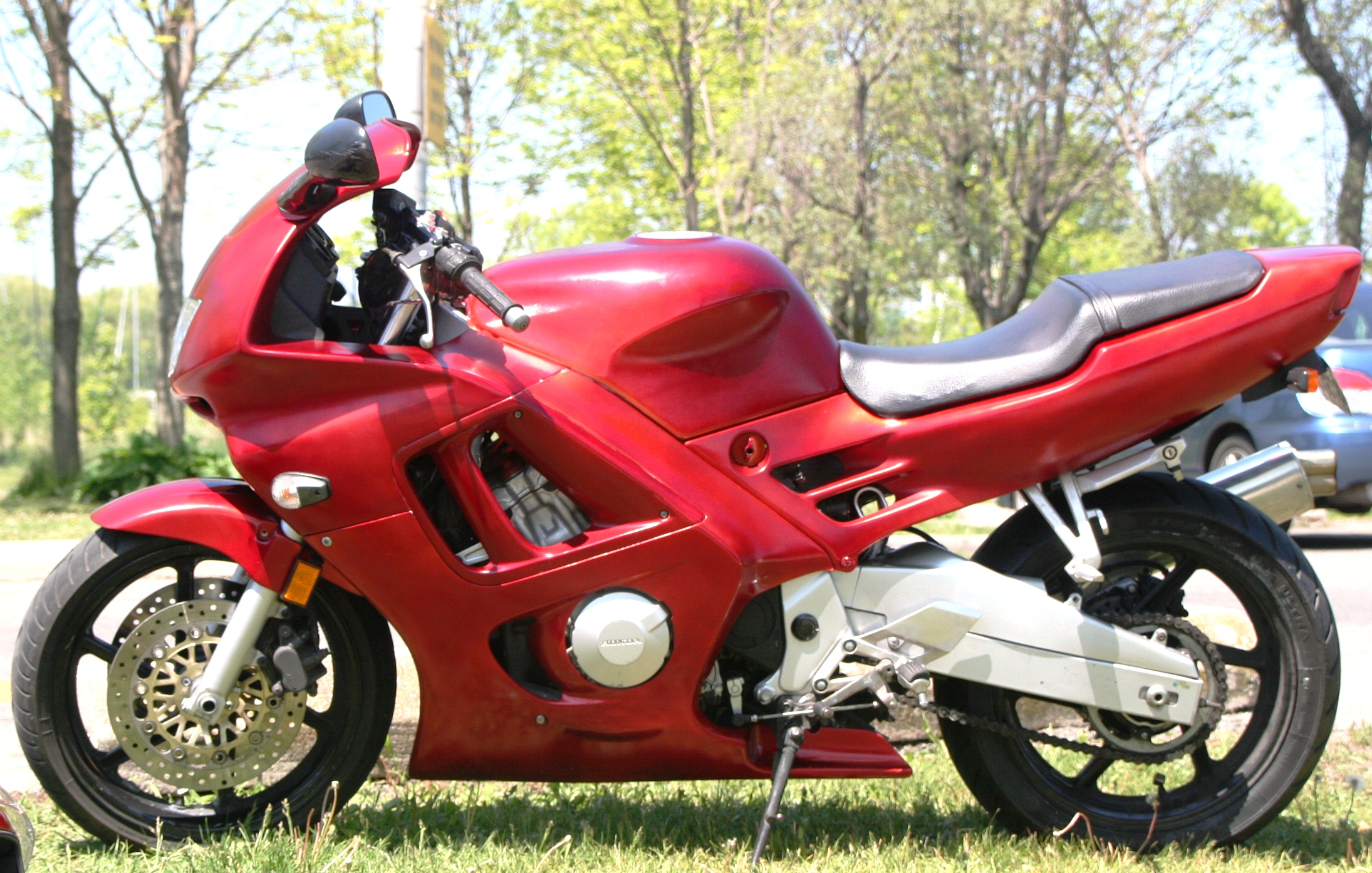
Honda CBR600F3

The CBR600F3 was the third generation of the CBR600F series. Replacing the F2, the F3 was produced from 1995 to 1998. It had a modified engine, ram-air intake, and cartridge front forks. The 1997 and 1998 models also came with a deeper engine oil pan, sleeker tail fairings, seat and tail-light, and a revised engine cylinder head, netting about a 3.7 kilowatts (5 metric horsepower; 5 horsepower) gain over 1995–1996 models. The capacitor-discharge ignition (CDI) and ram-air system were also revised to allowed for smoother power curve over the 1995–1996 models, which could sometimes be jerky. The last made 1998 models were supplied with another revised engine cylinder head which resulted in a slight power gain. In 1999, it was replaced by the CBR600F4.

In 1996 and 1998, the F3 was also sold in 'Smokin' Joe's Replica' versions in the United States, Canada, and Australia (1998 only).

Cycle World tested the F3's acceleration from 0 to 97 kilometres per hour (0 to 60 miles per hour) at 3 seconds and 0 to 402 metres (0 to 1/4 mile) at 10.9 seconds at 201.62 kilometres per hour (125.28 miles per hour). Motorcycle Consumer News recorded a 0 to 97 kilometres per hour (0 to 60 miles per hour) time of 3.36 seconds and a quarter mile time of 11.03 seconds at 199.66 kilometres per hour (124.06 miles per hour).

=== CBR600F4 (1999–2000) ===
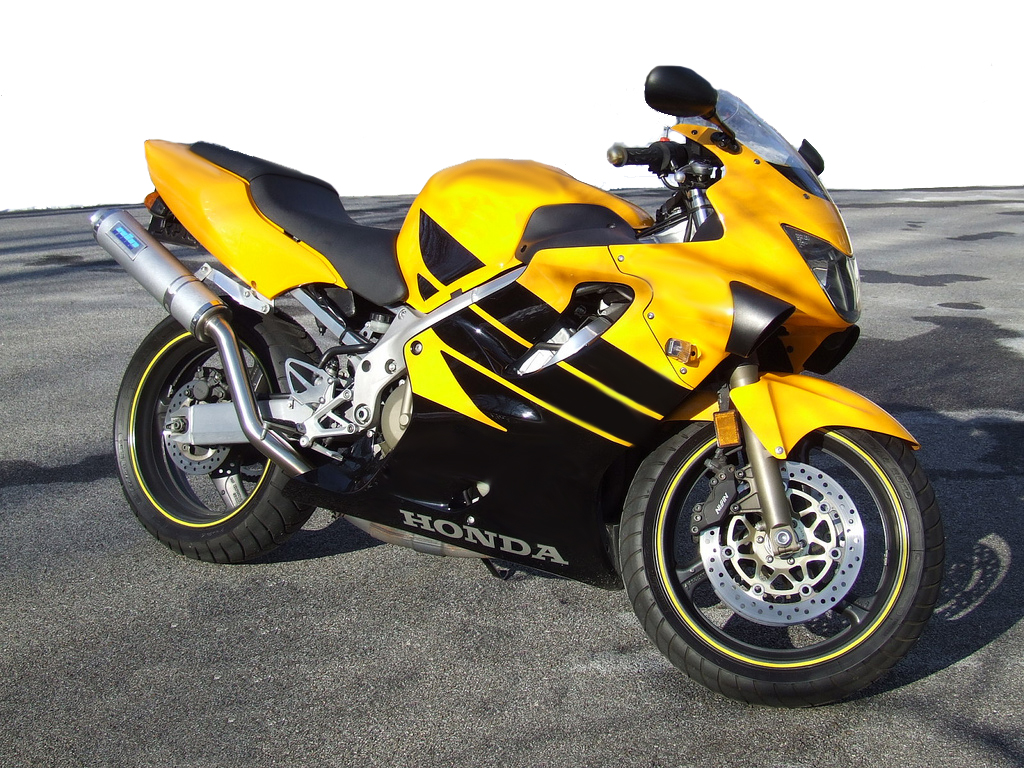
Honda CBR600F4

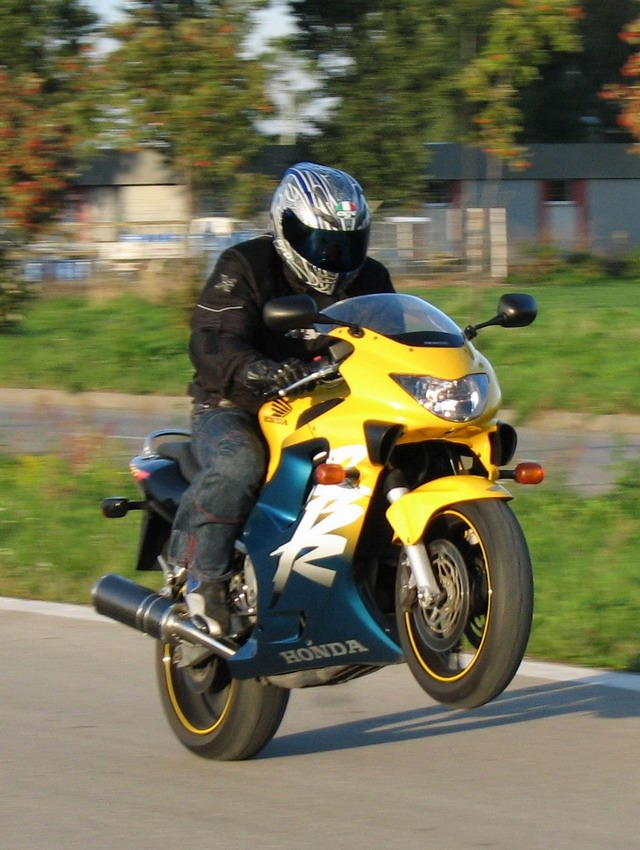
Honda CBR600F4

The CBR600F4 was produced between 1999 and 2000. Known as the CBR600F-X in Europe, it was the last of the CBR600 series of Honda sport bikes to be fuelled by carburettors. An all-new aluminium-alloy twin-spar frame which reduced frame weight was used, and the engine crankcase was designed to share the swingarm pivot. Through a reduction of internal friction and weight, combined with larger valves, shorter stroke and a bigger bore, higher maximum engine operating revolutions were enabled. The spark plug caps had ignition coils built into them. Slightly larger carburettor were fitted, and the oil cooler was now located by the oil filter. A new suspension had larger 43 millimetres (1.7 inches) forks and used Fireblade parts. The dual front disc brakes were upgraded, and the rear wheel width increased to 140 millimetres (5.5 inches) with new three-spoke wheels. The F4 was fitted with Honda's HISS electronic engine immobiliser system.

The phrase "Dedicated to Super Evaluators Dirk Vandenberg and Josef Boyd" are embossed in raised letters on the inside of the F4's upper fairing; the dedication to two of Honda R&D's senior product developers who were killed during the final testing of this model.

=== CBR600F4i (2001–2006) ===
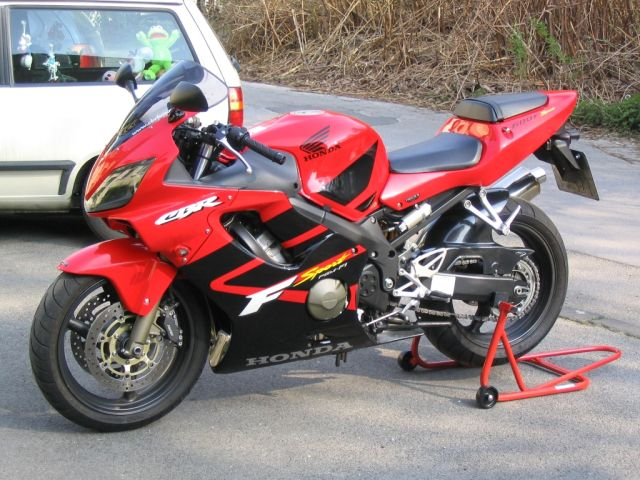
Honda CBR600F4i

The CBR600F4i was produced from 2001 to 2006. The upgraded F4i is a modified F4 with numerous engine, chassis and bodywork changes.

The 2001 US F4i had a new subframe which raises the seat by 5 mm (0.2 in) that allows for more under-seat storage room and improved two-tier seat. The new tail unit has less padding and a higher perch for the pillion passenger. The F4i's taillight is smaller with a new dual-bulb configuration. The F4i had a new dash layout with a large analogue tachometer. The new LCD digital display had a speedometer, odometer, clock, engine temperature read-out, amber shift light, and trip meters. The single largest change aside from the styling is the addition of high-pressure 50 pounds per square inch (340 kilopascals) PGM-FI (programmed fuel injection) system, thus the model designation 'F4i'. In a number of countries, the bike was sold in both the 'normal' and 'Sport' variants, the Sport having a two-part seat, no pillion grab rail, and no main stand (though the main stand mounting holes remained). Fuel injection allows for more precise fuel metering and delivery over a wider rpm range, while providing better throttle response and reducing emissions. The fuel injectors reside one per cylinder, and are aspirated through four 38 millimetres (1.5 inches) throttle bodies. Each injector has four nozzles, and together the injectors add up to 3.7 kilowatts (5 metric horsepower; 5 horsepower) over the non-injected F4.

The weight of the road wheels was reduced. The brake disc carriers moved out closer to the brake calipers to reduce weight and to improve rigidity. But stopping power still was not on par with other bikes in the class. There is additional bracing on the steering head for more response, better feedback and feel from the front end. The suspension has also been tweaked with less high-speed damping and a little more low-speed damping with the shock and fork being more street-bias.

Additional engine changes include a lighter camshaft sprocket and increased valve spring pressure (two springs per intake valve) which allow for higher revving. There are new piston rings that slide with less friction and increased internal engine oil flow. Redline is now 14,200 rpm, 700 rpm higher than the previous year's F4. To increase the bike's pulling capabilities at high speeds, the fifth and sixth gears have been shortened slightly, and the rear sprocket was enlarged from 45 teeth to 46, also adding one additional clutch plate for greater durability to now totalling eight. The oiling holes in the camshafts have been enlarged by 0.5 millimetres (0.02 inches) (to 2.5 millimetres (0.10 inches)), and piston ring friction has been decreased to aid cooling at the higher rev ceiling. Spring pressures on the intake and exhaust valves have been increased to avoid valve float. Also, there are now two valve springs (inner and outer) on the intake side instead of the single item that resides on the exhaust side.

The F4i's new bodywork carries a more racy look and provides a 3% reduction in drag. It also houses a new dual headlight front cowl design which uses 40% brighter H7 bulbs compared to the H4 bulbs in the predecessor. The headlights are dual multi-reflector units covered by a one-piece clear polycarbonate lens. The turn indicator stalks are shorter, and the rear-view mirrors are now positioned higher and closer to the rider. The elimination of carburetors allowed for a slightly larger air box and a larger 4.8 US gallons (18.2 litres; 4.0 imperial gallons) fuel tank. And a fuel consumption of 36.7 miles per US gallon (6.41 litres per 100 kilometres; 44.07 miles per imperial gallon).

In 2001 and 2002, in recognition of Honda's association with MotoGP champion Valentino Rossi and its 500th motorcycle Grand Prix victory, the CBR600F4i was also released in Europe and Australia (2001 & 2002 only) in two 'Rossi Replica' versions.

=== CBR600F (2011–2013) ===
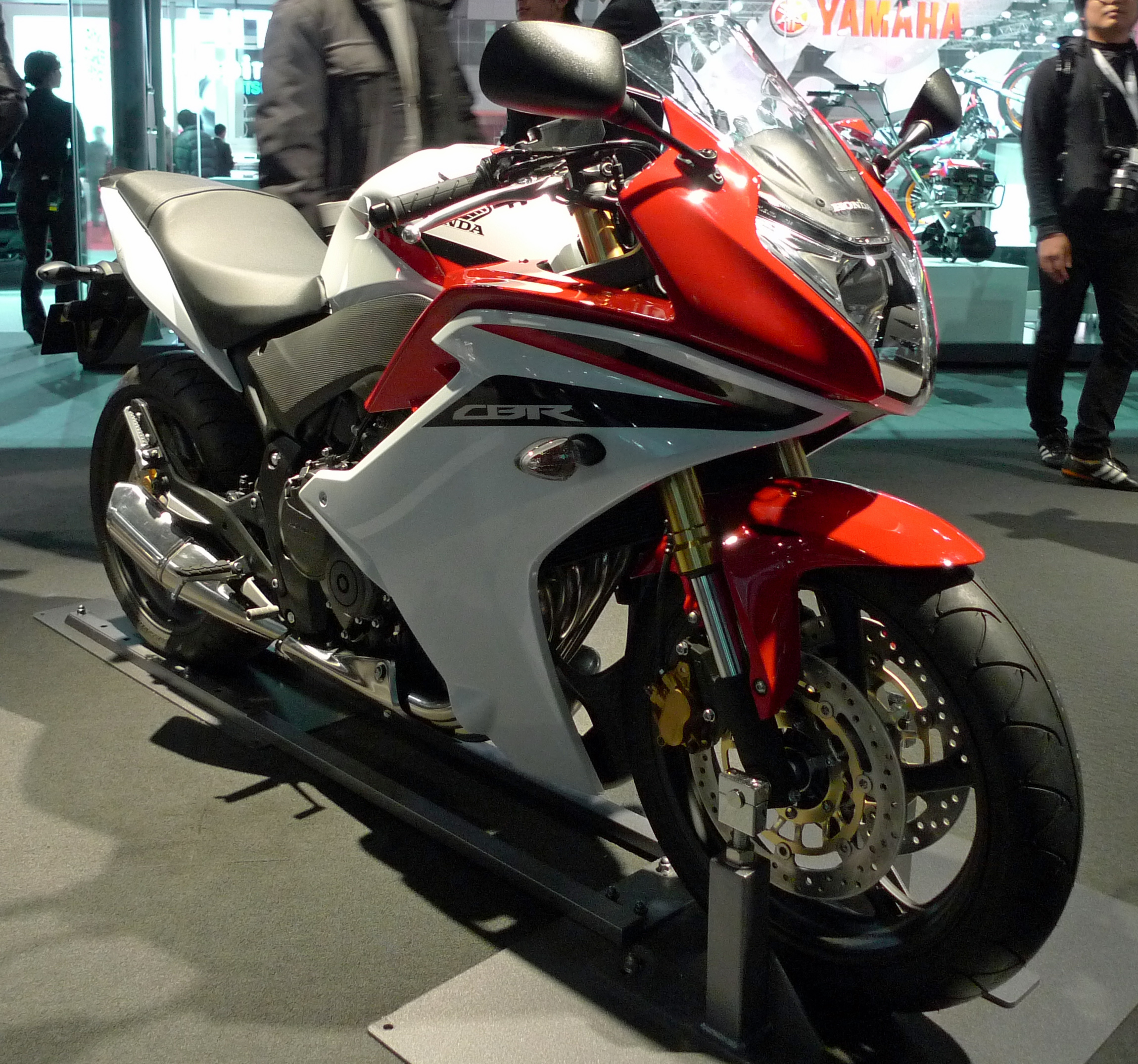
2011 Honda CBR600F

In 2011, Honda released the new CBR600F model built in Italy for the European markets that was not released in America. It continues the legacy of the CBR-F line. To honour the German rider Stefan Bradl, Honda Germany launched a special edition of the CBR600F, called CBR600F LCR. It featured an Arrow titanium exhaust, Progrip handlebar grips, a rear hugger, single seat cover, and an LCR sticker kit as well as combined braking and ABS. The CBR600F shares most of the components with the CB600F Hornet naked bike, such as inverted front forks, though longer by 50 millimetres (2.0 inches) and aluminium mono-backbone frame. It is wrapped in a multi-layered full fairing that lowers drag and protects the rider from wind-blast, as well as new instruments, handlebars and fuel tank. It also retains a similar relaxed seating position to minimise rider fatigue. The 2011 CBR600F also shares the engine of the highly revised CB600F model that was released in April 2007. This engine is a detuned version of that which is available in the 2007 CBR600RR, giving a maximum output power of approximately 76 kilowatts (103 metric horsepower; 102 horsepower) at 12,000 rpm and 65 newton-metres (47.9 pound force-feet) of torque at 10,500 rpm.

== Specifications ==
All specifications are claimed by the manufacturer unless otherwise specified.

Honda CBR600F models
model	CBR600F	CBR600F2	CBR600F3	CBR600F4	CBR600F4i	CBR600F
model years	1987–1990	1991–1994	1995–1998	1999–2000	2001–2006	2011–2013
engine displacement	599 cubic centimetres (36.6 cubic inches)					
engine type	all aluminium alloy, four-stroke inline four-cylinder, liquid cooled					
bore × stroke	63.0 mm × 48.0 mm (2.480 in × 1.890 in)	65.0 mm × 45.2 mm (2.559 in × 1.780 in)		67.0 mm × 42.5 mm (2.638 in × 1.673 in)		
compression ratio	11.0:1	11.5:1	12:1			
motive power	85.8 hp (64.0 kW) @ 11,000 rpm (claimed)	97 hp (72 kW) @ 12,000 rpm (claimed); 85 hp (63 kW) (rear wheel)	90.2 hp (67.3 kW) (rear wheel)	94.1 hp (70.2 kW) (rear wheel)	109 hp (81 kW) @ 12,500 rpm (claimed); 90.1 hp (67.2 kW) at rear wheel	102 hp (76 kW) @ 12,000 rpm (claimed)
torque	44 lb⋅ft (60 N⋅m) @ 8,500 rpm (claimed)	47.2 lb⋅ft (64.0 N⋅m) @ 10,500 rpm (claimed)	43.0 lb⋅ft (58.3 N⋅m) (rear wheel)	43.6 lb⋅ft (59.1 N⋅m) (rear wheel)	46 lb⋅ft (62 N⋅m) @ 10,000 rpm (claimed)	47.94 lb⋅ft (65.00 N⋅m) @ 10,500 rpm (claimed)
top speed		147 mph (237 km/h)	153 mph (246 km/h)	156 mph (251 km/h)	155 mph (249 km/h)	
transmission	six-speed manual, multi-plate wet clutch					
tyres	Front: 110/80-17; Rear: 130/80-17	Front: 120/60-17; Rear: 160/60-17	Front: 120/60-17; Rear: 160/60-17	Front: 120/70-17; Rear: 180/55-17	Front: 120/70-17; Rear: 180/55-17	Front: 120/70-17; Rear: 180/55-17
chassis frame	steel twin spar frame			aluminium-alloy twin-spar, box-section		aluminium-alloy mono-backbone frame
suspension	Front: 37 mm (1.5 in) telescopic fork Rear: Pro-Link monoshock with spring-preload	Front: 41 mm (1.6 in) telescopic fork Rear: Pro-Link monoshock with spring-preload	Front: 41 mm (1.6 in) HMAS cartridge fork preload and rebound adjustability Rear: Pro-Link HMAS monoshock fully adjustable	Front: 43 mm (1.7 in) HMAS fully adjustable cartridge-type fork Rear: Pro-Link HMAS monoshock fully adjustable	Front: 43 mm (1.7 in) HMAS fully adjustable cartridge-type fork Rear: Pro-Link HMAS monoshock fully adjustable	Front: 41 mm (1.6 in) inverted telescopic fork Rear: monoshock adjustable with spring-preload
brakes	Front: 276 mm (10.9 in) dual disk, 2 piston calliper Rear: 218 mm (8.6 in) single disk, 1 piston sliding calliper	Front: 276 mm (10.9 in) dual disk, 2 piston calliper Rear: 218 mm (8.6 in) single disk, 1 piston sliding calliper	Front: 296 mm (11.7 in) dual disk, 2 piston calliper Rear: 218 mm (8.6 in) single disk, 1 piston sliding calliper	Front: 296 mm (11.7 in) dual disk, 4 piston calliper Rear: 220 mm (8.7 in) single disk, 1 piston sliding calliper	Front: 296 mm (11.7 in) dual disk, 4 piston calliper Rear: 220 mm (8.7 in) single disk, 1 piston sliding calliper	Front: 296 mm (11.7 in) dual disk, 2 piston calliper Rear: 240 mm (9.4 in) single disk, 1 piston sliding calliper
dimensions	length: 2,050 mm (80.7 in) width: 685 mm (27.0 in)	length: 2,010 mm (79.1 in) width: 695 mm (27.4 in)	length: 2,055 mm (80.9 in) width: 685 mm (27.0 in)			length: 2,150 mm (84.6 in) width: 740 mm (29.1 in) height: 1,150 mm (45.3 in)
rake, trail			25.2°, 94 mm (3.7 in)		24.0°, 96 mm (3.8 in)	24.0°, 96 mm (3.8 in)
wheelbase	1,410 mm (55.5 in)	1,405 mm (55.3 in)	1,400 mm (55.3 in)	1,390 mm (54.9 in)	1,390 mm (54.7 in)	1,390 mm (54.9 in)
seat height	770 mm (30.3 in)	810 mm (31.9 in)	810 mm (31.9 in)	810 mm (31.9 in)	805 mm (31.7 in)	805 mm (31.7 in)
dry weight	180 kg (400 lb)	185 kg (408 lb) (Honda manual)		170 kg (370 lb)	168 kg (370 lb)	
wet weight	204 kg (450 lb)	205 kg (452 lb) (Honda service manual)	206 kg (454 lb) (Honda service manual)	197 kg (434 lb)	200 kg (440 lb)	206 kg (454 lb) F 211 kg (465 lb) FA
fuel capacity	16.5 L (3.6 imp gal; 4.4 US gal)	16.0 L (3.5 imp gal; 4.2 US gal)	17.0 L (3.7 imp gal; 4.5 US gal)	18.0 L (4.0 imp gal; 4.8 US gal)	18.0 L (4.0 imp gal; 4.8 US gal)	18.0 L (4.0 imp gal; 4.8 US gal)

== In popular culture ==
The best-known song by American singer-songwriter David Wilcox, "Eye of the Hurricane", refers to this motorcycle.
