= Honda CBR600RR =

Sports motorcycle

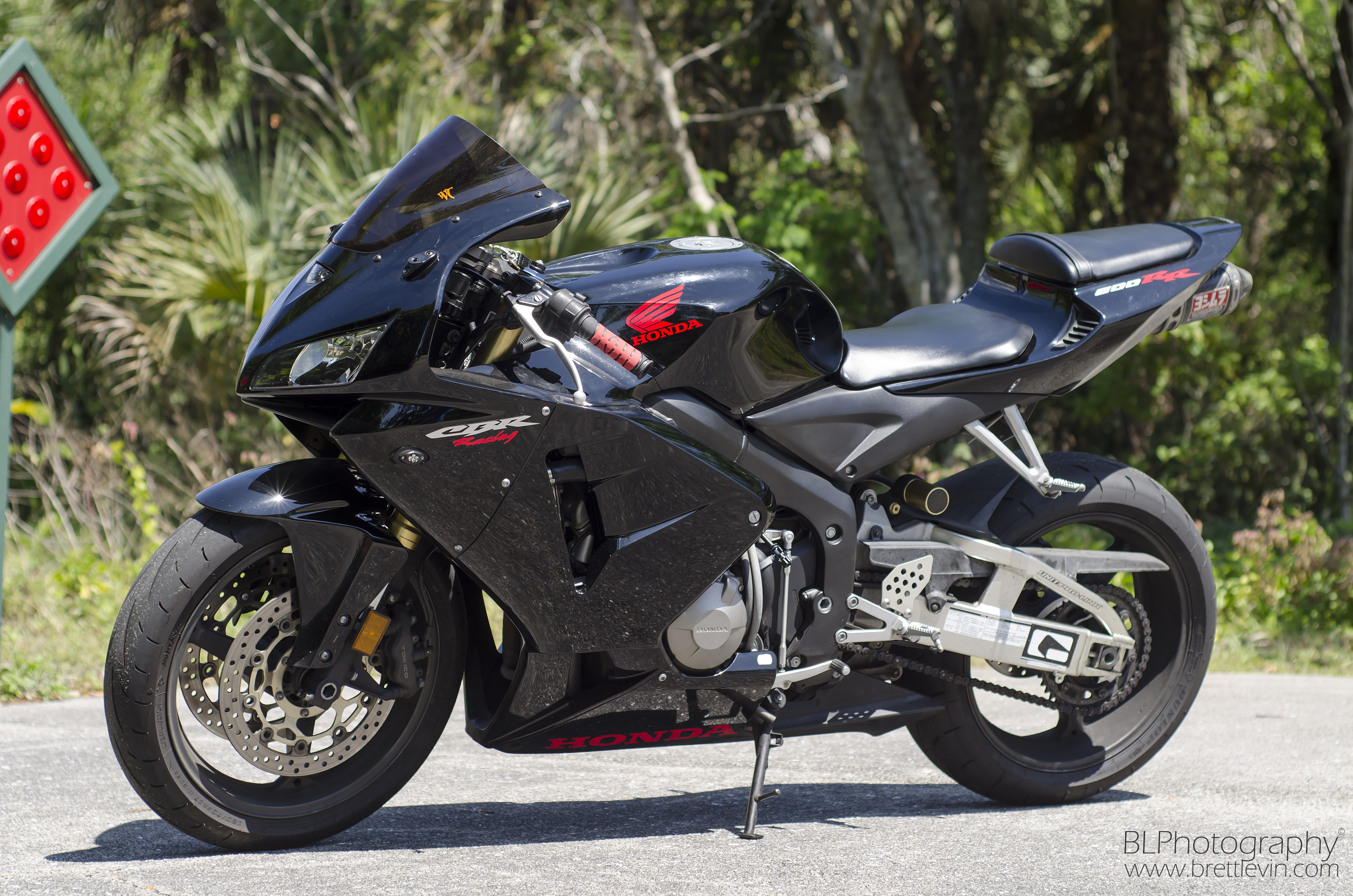
- 2006 Honda CBR600RR
- Manufacturer: Honda
- Production: 2003–present
- Predecessor: Honda CBR600F4i
- Class: Sport bike
- Related: Honda CBR1000RR

The Honda CBR600RR is a 599 cc (36.6 cu in) sports motorcycle made by Honda in the CBR series since 2003. The CBR600RR is marketed as Honda's sports bike model for the middle-weight class.

After succeeding the 2002 Supersport World Champion 2001–2006 CBR600F4i, which was then repositioned as the tamer, more street-oriented sport bike behind the technically more advanced and uncompromising race-replica CBR600RR. It carried the Supersport World Championship winning streak into 2003, and on through 2008, and won in 2010 and 2014.

== Model history ==
Honda's previous 600-class sport bike, the CBR600F4i, was considered a balance of practicality and performance, as capable as other Supersport-racing 600s, but a more docile and comfortable street bike relative to the competing Kawasaki Ninja ZX-6R, Suzuki GSX-R600, and Yamaha YZF-R6. When introduced in 1999, the CBR600F "fought off racier contenders on the track while still managing to be a more practical streetbike", as described by Motorcyclist, "one golf club that acts like a whole bag." With the successor 2003 CBR600RR, Honda shifted to a more aggressive, less compromising strategy in the "churning dogfight that was the middleweight class at the time", Honda's CBR-RR Project Leader Hiroyuki Ito said, "We developed the RR in a completely different way from any model in the past. In the past Honda has always developed a roadbike, then modified it for racing. But with the RR, we first built a prototype racer, then gave it to the production department." Rotating an aging model down to the next tier of a product line as it is overshadowed by a model with the latest technology is common practice among sport bike manufacturers including Buell, Ducati, Honda, Kawasaki, Suzuki, Triumph, and Yamaha.

=== 2003–2004 ===
The 2003 CBR600RR was based on technologies used in the Honda RC211V MotoGP bike, and was given a similar appearance. It was the first Honda to use Unit Pro-Link rear suspension, a variant on the single rear shock absorber with the upper mount connected to the rear swingarm subframe to help isolate undesirable forces transmitted to the steering head. It also was the first to use Honda's Dual Stage Fuel Injection (PGM-DSFI): both were taken directly from the RC211V. Honda said that the use of its new 'Hollow Fine Die Cast' frame technology, in which sand casting molds were given a ceramic interior coating, made it possible to reduce the thickness of the five-piece aluminum frame from 3.5 mm to 2.5 mm.

The 2003 model carried over to 2004 technically unchanged, with only the addition of an oxygen sensor.

=== 2005–2006 ===
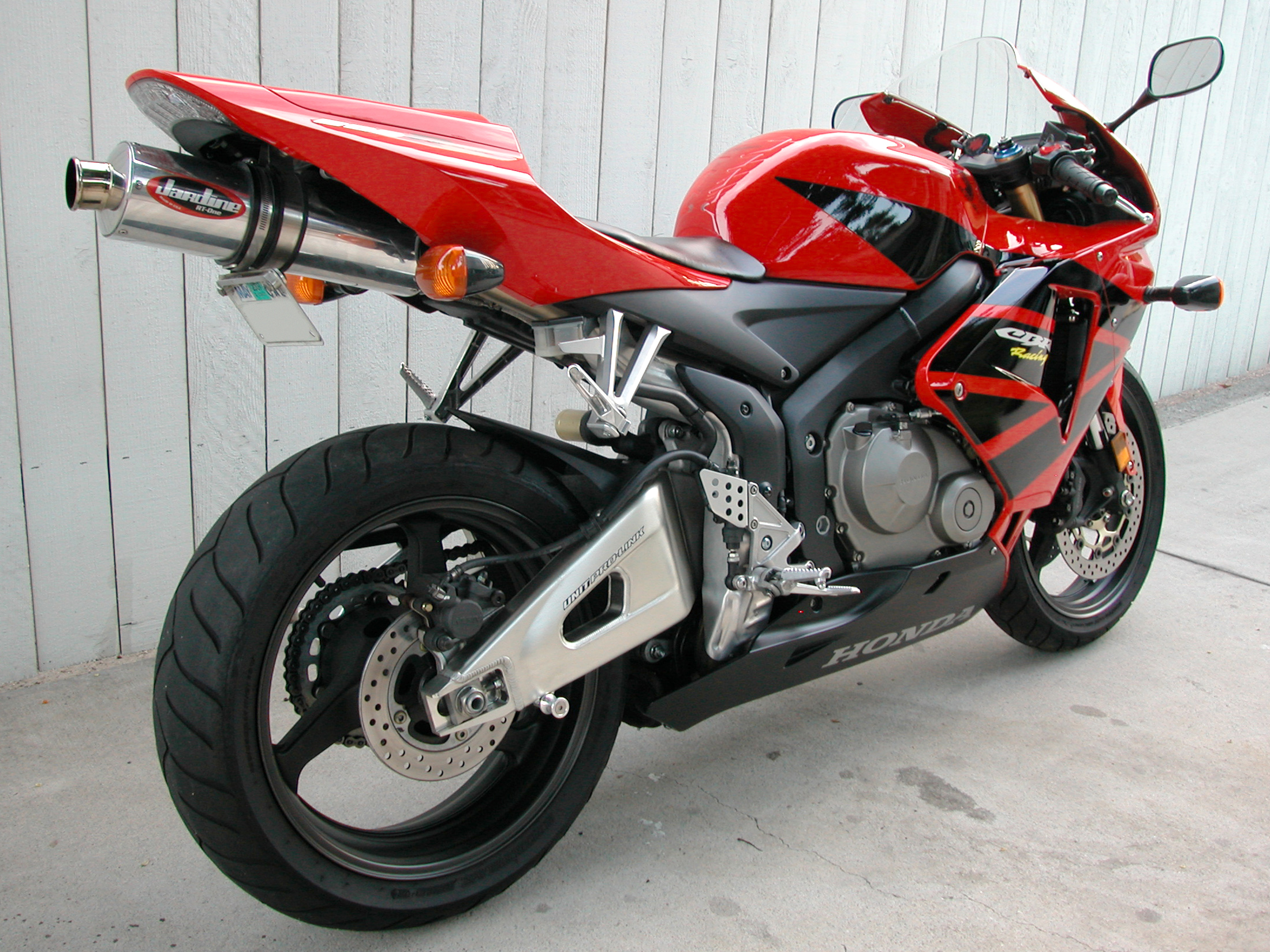
2006 CBR600RR

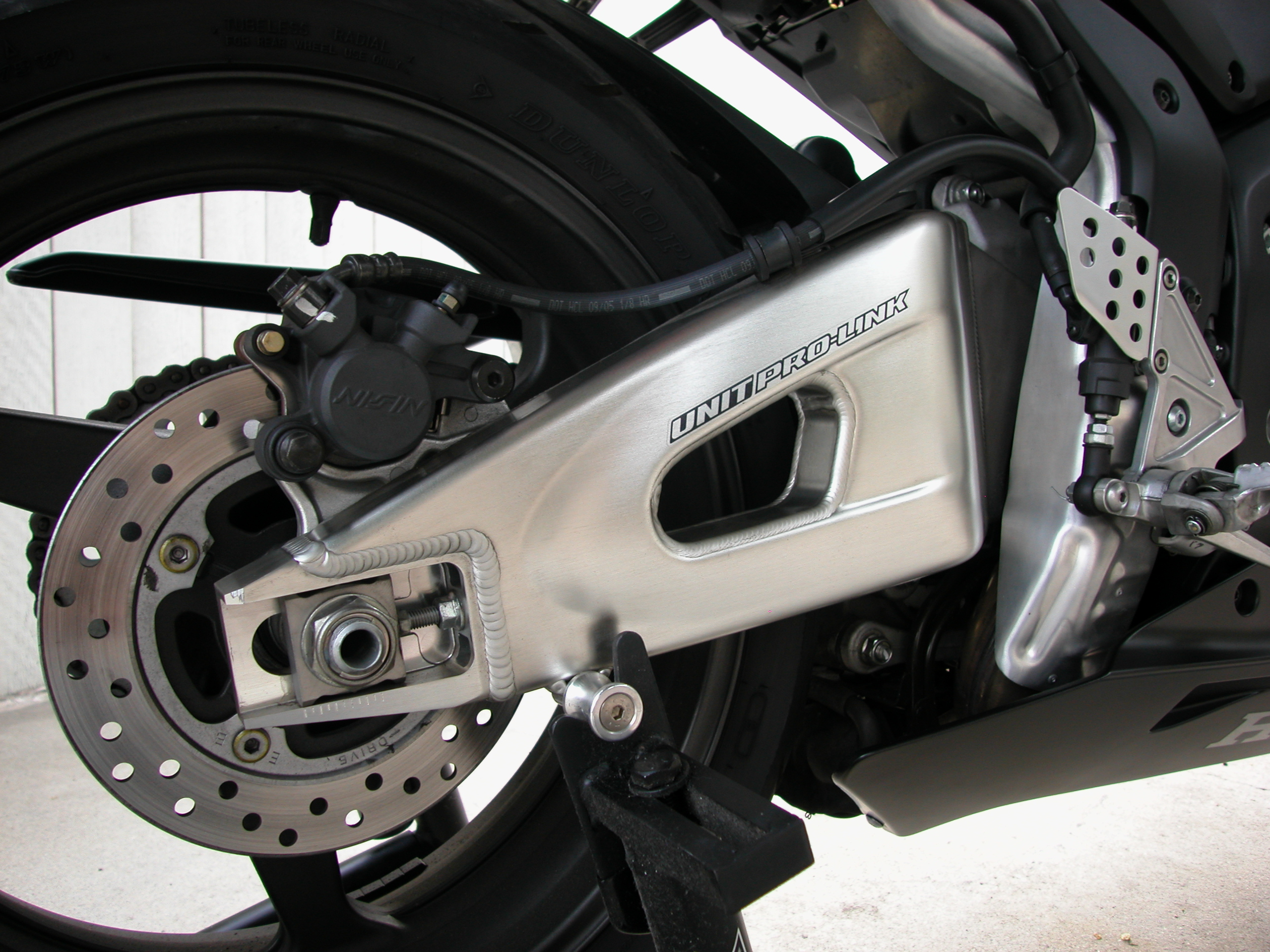
Unit Pro-Link swingarm

In 2005, the CBR600RR received a major revision with new bodywork, fully adjustable inverted front forks, disc brakes with radial-mounted four-piston calipers, and a new aluminum frame, swingarm and rear shock. The midrange power was also increased. Also in 2005 a catalytic converter was added to the exhaust system. These changes along with additional refinements to the engine and exhaust system brought CBR600RR's wet weight down by 10.0 kg (22 lb), and dry weight by 4.1 kg (9 lb). The 2006 model was unchanged from the 2005 model.

Special Edition – Developed for markets requesting a 400cc-class Supersport

The Honda CBR 400RR Anniversary Edition pays tribute to the CBR line while meeting the demand from countries where mid-range displacement limits apply. Inspired by the CBR600RR’s design and aerodynamics, this special anniversary model retains Honda’s race-bred DNA while introducing a finely tuned 400cc inline-four engine for optimal balance between performance and accessibility.

This edition combines the bodywork and styling of the CBR600RR with a lighter chassis and slightly reduced power output, offering the same sharp handling, precision, and Honda reliability that define the CBR legacy.

=== 2007–2008 ===
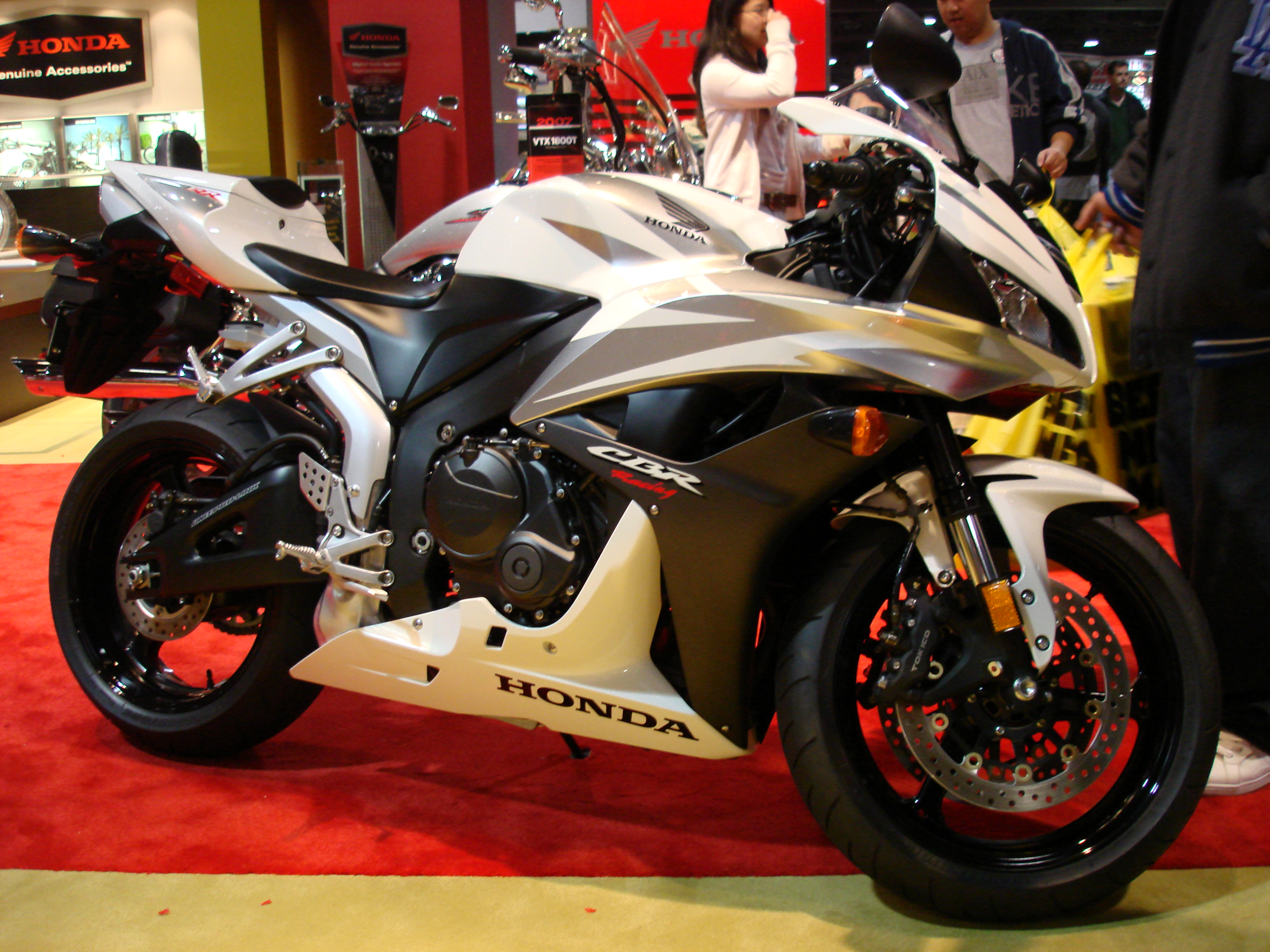

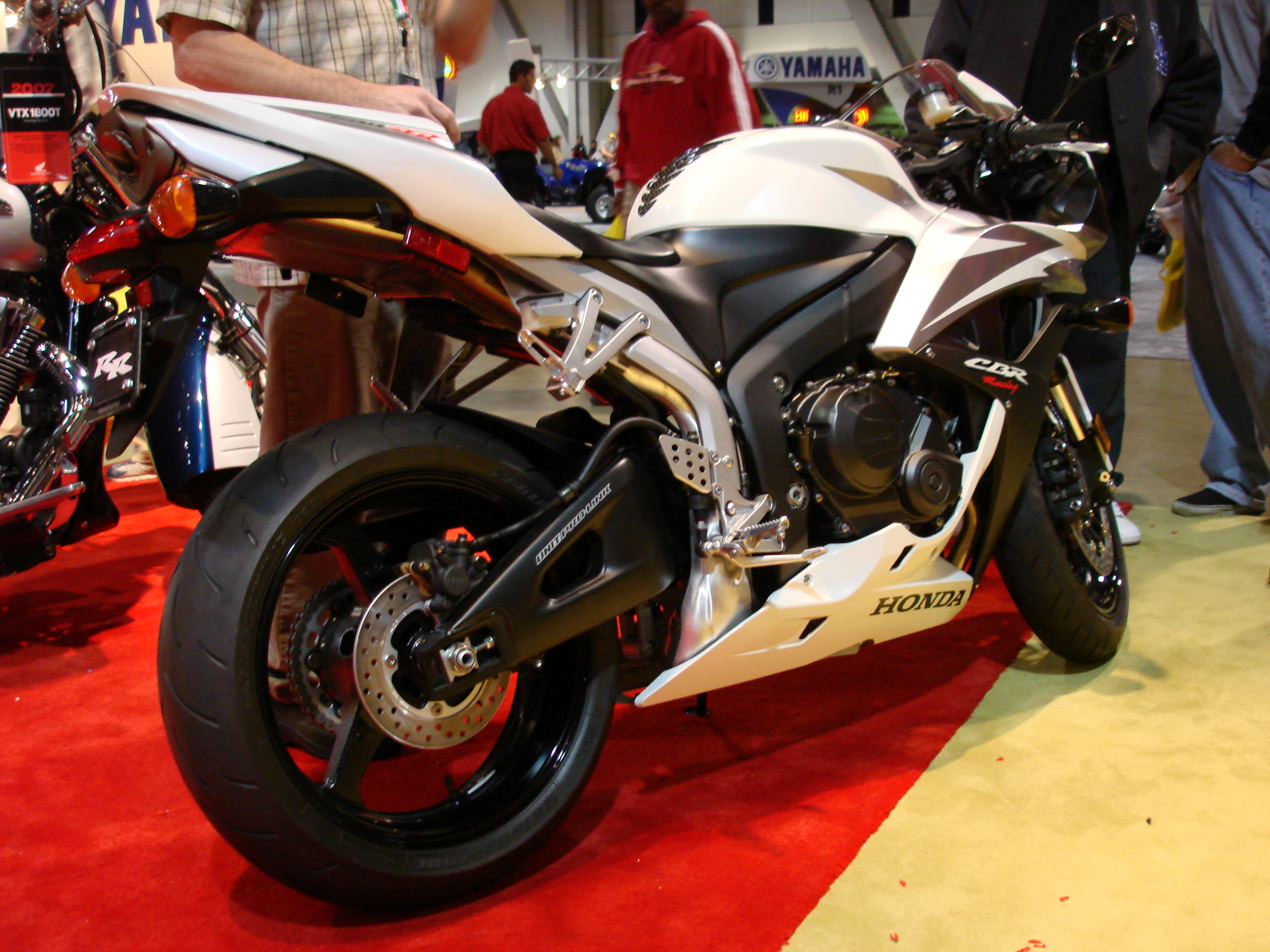
2007 CBR600RR at the International Motorcycle Show

On September 6, 2006, Honda revealed an all new CBR600RR for the 2007 model year.

The CBR600's most radical redesign since the introduction of the RR in 2003 is highlighted by a whole new engine, frame, and bodywork that results in a smaller, lighter, more-powerful CBR600RR with a class-leading power-to-weight ratio and unparalleled performance.

Weight was the primary focus of the redesign. The result was a 9.1 kg (20 lb) reduction in dry weight over the 2006 model, from a claimed 163.7 kg (361 lb) to 154.7 kg (341 lb). Tested weights without fuel were 182–182 kg (401–402 lb).

In redesigning the CBR600RR for lighter weight and increased performance, Honda's engineers started with the engine. The completely new engine was smaller and lighter than its predecessor, the designers having used careful positioning of all internal components to achieve reductions in the motor's length, width, and height, as well as reducing weight by 2 kg (4.4 lb) compared to the 2006 model's powerplant. Horsepower increased to about 105 hp (78 kW) measured in independent tests.

The frame was lighter and more compact than the 2006 CBR600RR. The handling of the new bike was sharpened by its 22 mm (0.87 in) shorter wheelbase, as well as by the designer's focus on strict mass centralization. Despite the shorter wheelbase, the 2007 model's swingarm was 5 mm (0.20 in) longer than that of the 2006, made possible by the more compact dimensions of the new bike's engine.

The suspension of the 2007 model was carried over almost unchanged from the 2006 bike, with the same 41 mm (1.6 in) inverted fork in front, and Honda's Unit Pro-Link rear suspension configuration damping the rear wheel. The new three-spoke cast aluminum wheels were also lighter than those on the 2006 bike, which further contributed to the enhanced performance of the suspension. The brakes had dual radial-mount four-piston calipers and twin 310 mm (12 in) discs at the front, and a single-piston caliper and a 220 mm (8.7 in) disc at the rear. Hidden below the steering head was an updated version of the Honda Electronic Steering Damper (HESD) system, which was also available on the CBR1000RR.

The smaller, sharper-edged new front upper fairing was dominated by the large central ram-air duct which fed the airbox through an opening in the steering head section of the frame and was separated from the sides of the fairing by a large gap which Honda said was for air management purposes. The tail-section was similarly smaller and sharper-edged, riding atop a heavily restyled under-seat muffler.

==== Combined ABS prototype ====
On June 9, 2008, Honda revealed a CBR600RR prototype that had an all new braking system branded as Combined ABS which integrated combined braking, anti-lock braking, and brake-by-wire systems. Combined ABS used a computer control unit to ensure the correct balance of front and rear brake use and also controlled when the ABS should engage. The system was designed to be as unobtrusive as possible by delaying the engagement of the ABS until the last possible moment. Combined ABS was not made available on the production 2008 CBR600RR.

=== 2009–2012 ===
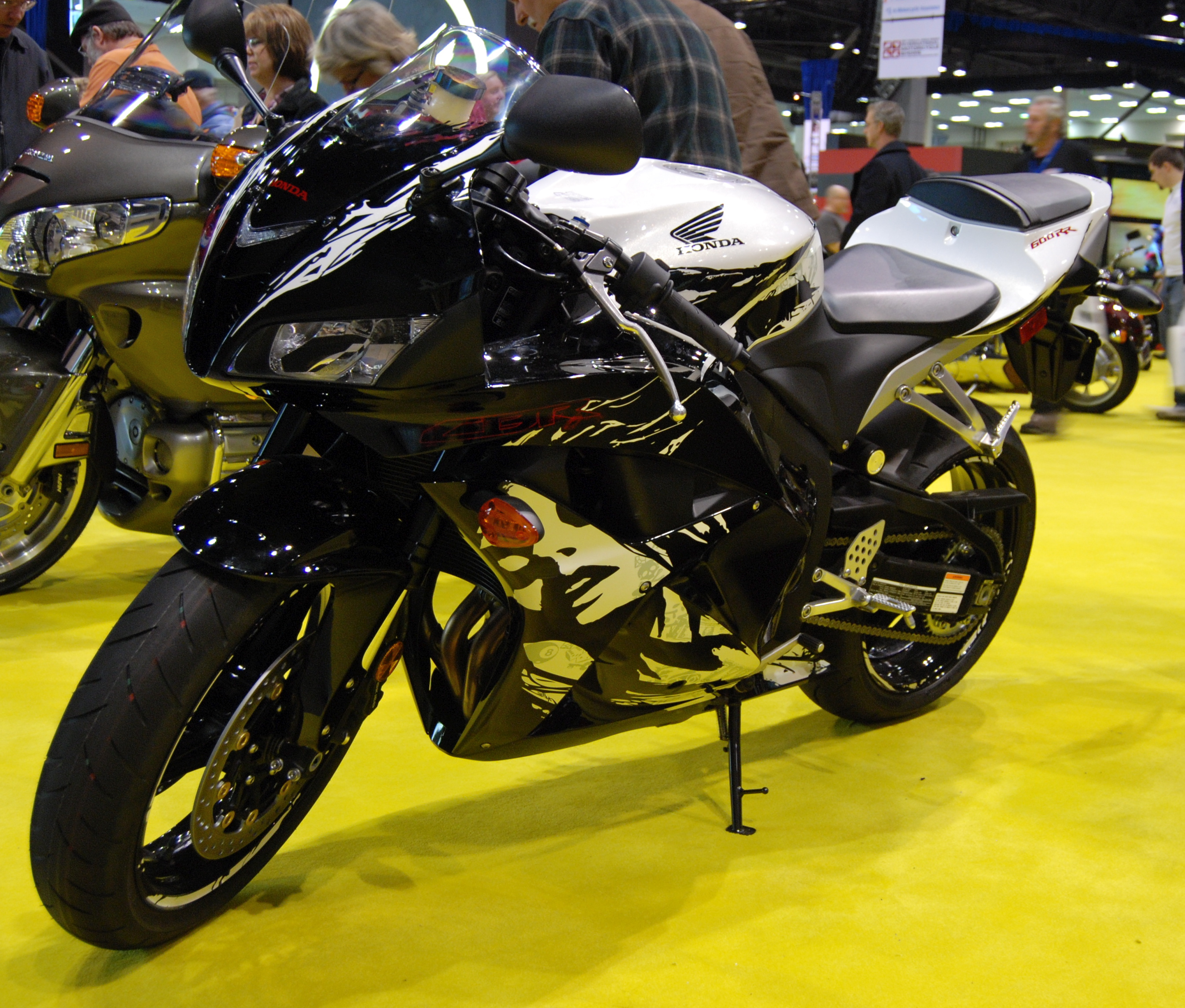
2010 Honda CBR600RR

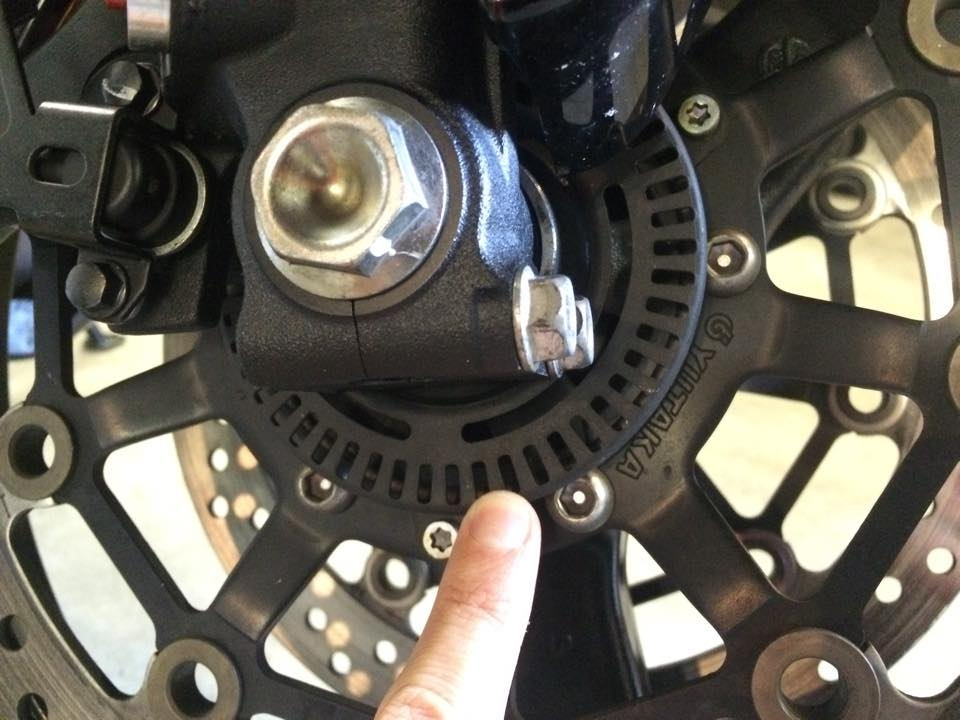
2009 Honda CBR600RR ABS tone ring that signals the wheel speed sensor

On September 5, 2008, Honda introduced a revised CBR600RR for the 2009 model year. Combined ABS became available as an option under the model (CBR600RA). Other changes included updates to the engine such as changes to its pistons, cylinder head and exhaust that Honda claims will increase torque delivery between 8,000 and 12,000 rpm with a 3.5% increase in torque at 10,000 rpm. The CBR600RR's engine also received a new high resistance valve lifter and a popup valve system inherited from the CBR1000RR. It looks were the same as last year apart from some extra mouldings added to the fairing mid-sections that enhance stability and reduce noise emission levels by now totally enclosing the clutch and gearbox. Although all of these changes involved the addition of some materials, the overall weight of the 2009 CBR600RR remained the same as the 2008 model. This was achieved through weight savings in the engine, exhaust, and the chassis.

The CBR600RR carried over for the 2010, 2011 and 2012 model years.

=== 2013–2021 ===
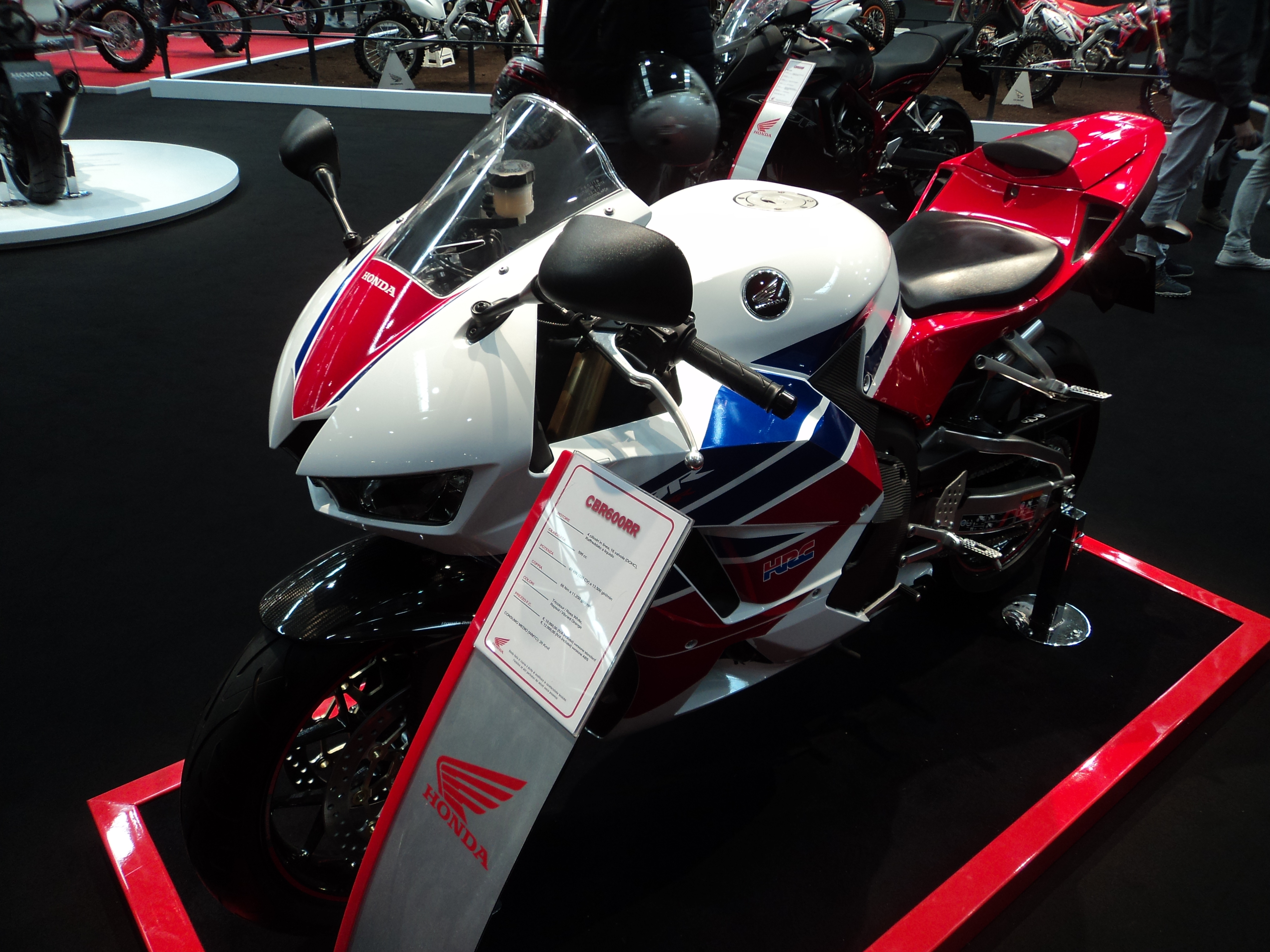
2016 CBR 600RR

The 2013 CBR600RR includes new 12-spoke wheels, revised ECU settings, and a fine-tuned ram-air system to increase torque. It also gets a new Showa "Big Piston Fork" and retuned rear shock in a new bodywork. The model continued unchanged through the 2017 model year. Motorcycle.com said that while the CBR600RR's performance specifications, particularly the horsepower, were "pretty tame even for the middleweight class", and it lacked the newest technologies like cornering ABS, traction control and mobile apps, it remained a comfortable and good handling sport bike for the street.

Motor Cycle News said a Japanese source at Honda said that CBR600RR sales in Europe and the UK will end after the 2016 model year due to the redesign costs necessary to comply with Euro4 emissions regulations, which will come into effect on January 1, 2017. Sales of CBR600RRs in other markets are unaffected.

=== 2021–2026 ===
2021–2026 CBR600RR

The 2021 CBR600RR was released on 21 August 2020. Unlike previous models, it was sold solely in Japan and Oceania at first. Updated equipment include a TFT instrument panel and reworked bodywork.

In 2024, the model was finally launched in Europe. This came as a surprise due to the continent's strict emissions regulations that have killed off almost all of the 600cc supersports.

The United States, however, has been fully excluded from this launch as Honda has opted to sell the previous version for the 2025 and 2026 model years. It is unknown at this time whether Honda will bring this model to the United States market at all. The reason is possibly very specific regulatory standards regarding particular electronic components on the bike.

=== 2027–present ===
2027 CBR600RR

The CBR600RR was updated for 2027. The lower winglets have been redesigned as a frontal spoiler and integrated in to the area below the headlights. The Nissin-branded four-piston radial mount front brake calipers are used, which was taken from the CBR1000RR-R. The larger 5-inch TFT screen is also used.

== Market competition ==
=== 2007 ===
For the 2007 model year, the CBR600RR competed with the Ducati 749, a completely redesigned Kawasaki Ninja ZX-6R, Suzuki GSX-R600, Triumph Daytona 675, and Yamaha YZF-R6. Shootout comparisons by motorcycle magazines consistently awarded the CBR600RR first place in the super sport class. Major print and online publishers said the CBR600RR had a powerful engine and class-leading light weight.

=== 2008 ===
For the 2008 model year, the CBR600RR continued to compete with the Ninja ZX-6R, a revised GSX-R600, Daytona 675, and a R6. Even with no technical changes from the 2007 model, the CBR600RR continued to win middleweight shootouts at by Sport Rider, Motorcycle-USA, and Motorcycle.com.

== Racing ==
As of 2015, in the Supersport World Championship, the CBR600 won eight out of twelve titles since its introduction in 2003, and ten manufacturers' crowns since 2003.

In the 2010 season, with the introduction of the four-stroke Moto2 class in the MotoGP World Championship, the engines for the class were based on the CBR600RR, with a maximum power of 150 bhp (110 kW). Starting in the 2019 season, the Honda engines were replaced by a Triumph 765 cc (46.7 cu in) straight-three engine.

== Specifications ==
		2003–2004	2005–2006	2007–2008	2009–2012		2013–present
Model ID (s)		CBR600RR			CBR600RR; CBR600RA (combined ABS)		
Engine
Engine code		PC37		PC40			
Engine type		599 cc (36.6 cu in) liquid-cooled inline four-cylinder					
Bore × stroke		67.0 mm × 42.5 mm (2.64 in × 1.67 in)					
Compression ratio		12.0:1		12.2:1			
Valvetrain		DOHC; four valves per cylinder					
Fuel delivery		Dual Stage Fuel Injection (DSFI)		Dual Stage Fuel Injection (DSFI) with 40 mm (1.6 in) throttle bodies, Denso 12-hole injectors			
Ignition		Computer-controlled digital transistorized with three-dimensional mapping					
Power	Crankshaft (claimed)	87 kW (117 bhp) @ 13,000 rpm		88 kW (118 bhp) @ 13,500 rpm			
Power	Rear wheel (tested)	79.9 kW (107.2 hp) @ 13,500 rpm	74.9–78.7 kW (100.4–105.6 hp) @ 13,250 rpm	78.7 kW (105.5 hp) @ 14,100 rpm	72.85–74.28 kW (97.7–99.61 hp)		75.0 kW (100.6 hp) @ 12,500 rpm
Torque	Crankshaft (claimed)	64 N⋅m (47 lbf⋅ft) @ 11,000 rpm		66 N⋅m (49 lbf⋅ft) @ 11,250 rpm			
Torque	Rear wheel (tested)	61.6 N⋅m (45.4 lb⋅ft) @ 11,000	60.7–65.2 N⋅m (44.8–48.1 lb⋅ft) @ 10,750	62.5 N⋅m (46.1 lb⋅ft) @ 12,400 rpm	56.81–58.31 N⋅m (41.9–43.01 lb⋅ft)		60.7 N⋅m (44.8 lb⋅ft) @ 10,600 rpm.
Drivetrain
Transmission		Close-ratio six-speed					
Final drive		#525 O-ring-sealed chain					
Suspension	Front	45.0 mm (1.77 in) Honda Multi-Action System (HMAS) cartridge fork with spring preload, rebound and compression damping adjustability; 120 mm (4.7 in) travel	41.0 mm (1.61 in) inverted HMAS cartridge fork with spring-preload, rebound and compression-damping adjustability; 120 mm (4.7 in) travel				41 mm (1.6 in) inverted Big Piston Fork with spring preload, rebound and compression damping adjustability
Suspension	Rear	Unit Pro-Link HMAS single shock with spring preload, rebound and compression damping adjustability; 120 mm (4.7 in) travel	Unit Pro-Link HMAS single shock with spring-preload, rebound and compression-damping adjustability; 130 mm (5.1 in) travel				
Tires	Front	120/70ZR-17 radial					
Tires	Rear	180/55ZR-17 radial					
Brakes	Front	Dual four-piston calipers with 310.0 mm (12.20 in) discs	Dual radial-mounted four-piston calipers with 310.0 mm (12.20 in) discs		Dual radial-mounted Mono-block four-piston calipers with 310.0 mm (12.20 in) discs	Dual radial-mounted Mono-block four-piston calipers with 310.0 mm (12.20 in) discs Honda electronic Combined ABS	
Brakes	Rear	Single piston caliper with 220.0 mm (8.66 in) disc				Single piston caliper with 220.0 mm (8.66 in) disc, electronic combined ABS	
Dimensions
Rake		24.0°		23.9°			
Trail		95.0 mm (3.74 in)		97.7 mm (3.85 in)			
Wheelbase		1,390 mm (54.7 in)		1,370 mm (53.9 in)			
Seat height		820 mm (32.3 in)					
Dry weight		170 kg (370 lb)	164 kg (361 lb)	156 kg (345 lb)			
Dry weight			182–182 kg (401–402 lb)	173–175 kg (381–385 lb)	183 kg (403 lb) (with ABS); 175 kg (386 lb)	183 kg (403 lb)	
Wet weight		202 kg (445 lb)	195–195 kg (430–431 lb)	187–188 kg (412–415 lb)	190 kg (410 lb); 187 kg (412 lb)	196 kg (432 lb); 197 kg (435 lb)	189 kg (417 lb)
Performance
0 to 60 mph (0 to 97 km/h)			3.1 sec. (2005); 3.0 sec.(2006)				2.9 seconds (2013)
0 to 1/4 mi (0.00 to 0.40 km)			10.98 sec. @ 204.90 km/h (127.32 mph) (2005); 10.7 sec. @ 206.88 km/h (128.55 mph) (2006)	10.52 @ 211.47 km/h (131.40 mph)	10.80 @ 207.28 km/h (128.80 mph)		10.96 @ 205.67 km/h (127.80 mph)
Top speed			251 km/h (156 mph)				
Fuel economy			6.84 L/100 km; 41.3 mpg_{‑imp} (34.4 mpg_{‑US})				

== Awards ==
- 2003 Best Sportbike, Motorcyclist
- 2003 Machine of the Year, Motor Cycle News
- Machine of The Year 2007, Bike
- 2007 Supersport Shootout Winner, Motorcycle-USA.com
- 2007 Best Middleweight Sportbike, Motorcycle-USA.com
- 2008 Middleweight Smackdown Winner, Sport Rider
- 2008 Supersport Shootout Winner, Motorcycle-USA.com
- 2008 Supersport Shootout Winner, Motorcycle.com
- 2009 Best Sportsbike under 600cc: Honda CBR600RR C-ABS, Motor Cycle News
