= Richard Hammond =

English journalist, television presenter, and author (born 1969)

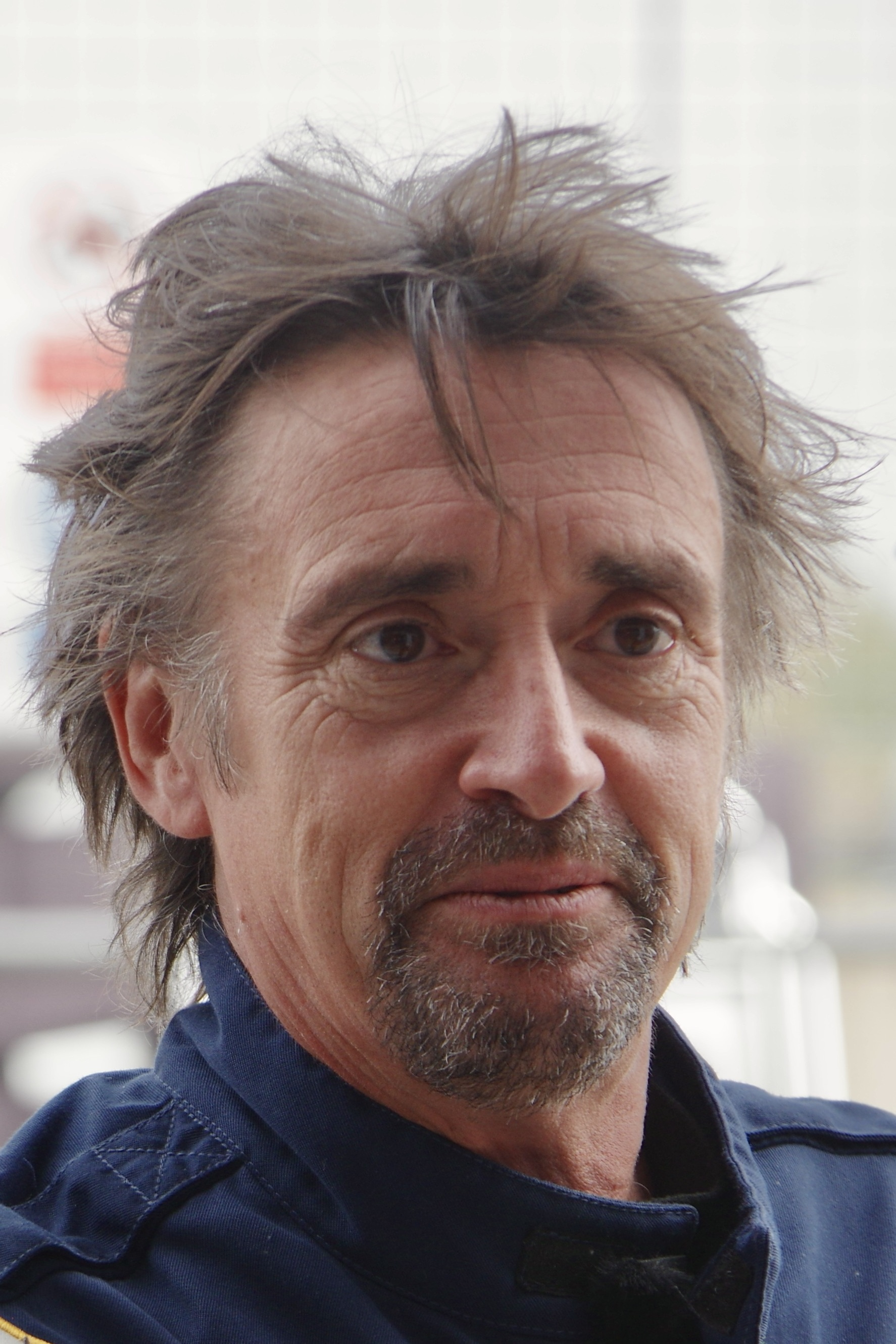
- Hammond in 2025
- Born: Richard Mark Hammond; 19 December 1969 (age 56); Solihull, Warwickshire, England
- Other name: Hamster
- Education: Harrogate College of Art and Technology
- Occupations: Broadcaster; journalist; businessman; author
- Years active: 1998–present
- Spouse: Amanda Etheridge (m. 2002; sep. 2024)
- Children: 2, including Izzy Hammond

Richard Mark Hammond (born 19 December 1969) is an English television presenter, journalist, and author. He is best known for co-hosting the BBC Two motoring programme Top Gear from 2002 until 2015 with Jeremy Clarkson and James May. From 2016 to 2024, the trio presented Amazon Prime Video's The Grand Tour.

Hammond has also presented entertainment documentary series Brainiac: Science Abuse (2003–2006), the game show Total Wipeout (2009–2012) and nature documentary series Planet Earth Live (2012). In 2016, along with Clarkson and May, Hammond launched the automotive social media website DriveTribe, which has a motoring channel on YouTube, where he currently hosts the videos with former Top Gear Stig Ben Collins and his daughter Izzy Hammond. Since 2021, Hammond has also hosted Richard Hammond's Workshop, a series which documents his attempts at running a classic car restoration business.

== Early life ==
Richard Mark Hammond was born on 19 December 1969, in Solihull, Warwickshire, England, eldest of three sons of Alan and Eileen Hammond. His younger brothers are Andrew (writer of the CRYPT book series) and Nicholas. He is the grandson of workers in the Birmingham car industry. In the mid-1980s Hammond moved with his family to the North Yorkshire cathedral city of Ripon located 8 miles south of the village of Thornton Watlass where his father ran a probate business in the market square. He attended Blossomfield Infant School in Solihull's Sharmans Cross district from the ages of 3 to 7. Originally a pupil of Solihull School, a fee-paying boys' independent school, he moved to Ripon Grammar School, and from 1986 to 1988 attended Harrogate College of Art and Technology.

He has shared that he was somehow expelled from sixth form college when he was 17.

== Career ==
After graduation, Hammond worked for several BBC radio stations, including Radio Cleveland, Radio York, Radio Cumbria, Radio Leeds and Radio Newcastle; as well as working for Renault's press office as a means to meet people from the motoring press.

In the period when he was presenting the afternoon programme at Radio Lancashire, his regular guests included motoring journalist Zog Ziegler, who would review a car of the week during a phone interview conducted by Hammond. The two became good friends, and it was Ziegler who encouraged Hammond to enter motoring reviews on television. After starting out on satellite TV (Men & Motors), he auditioned for Top Gear.

=== Top Gear ===
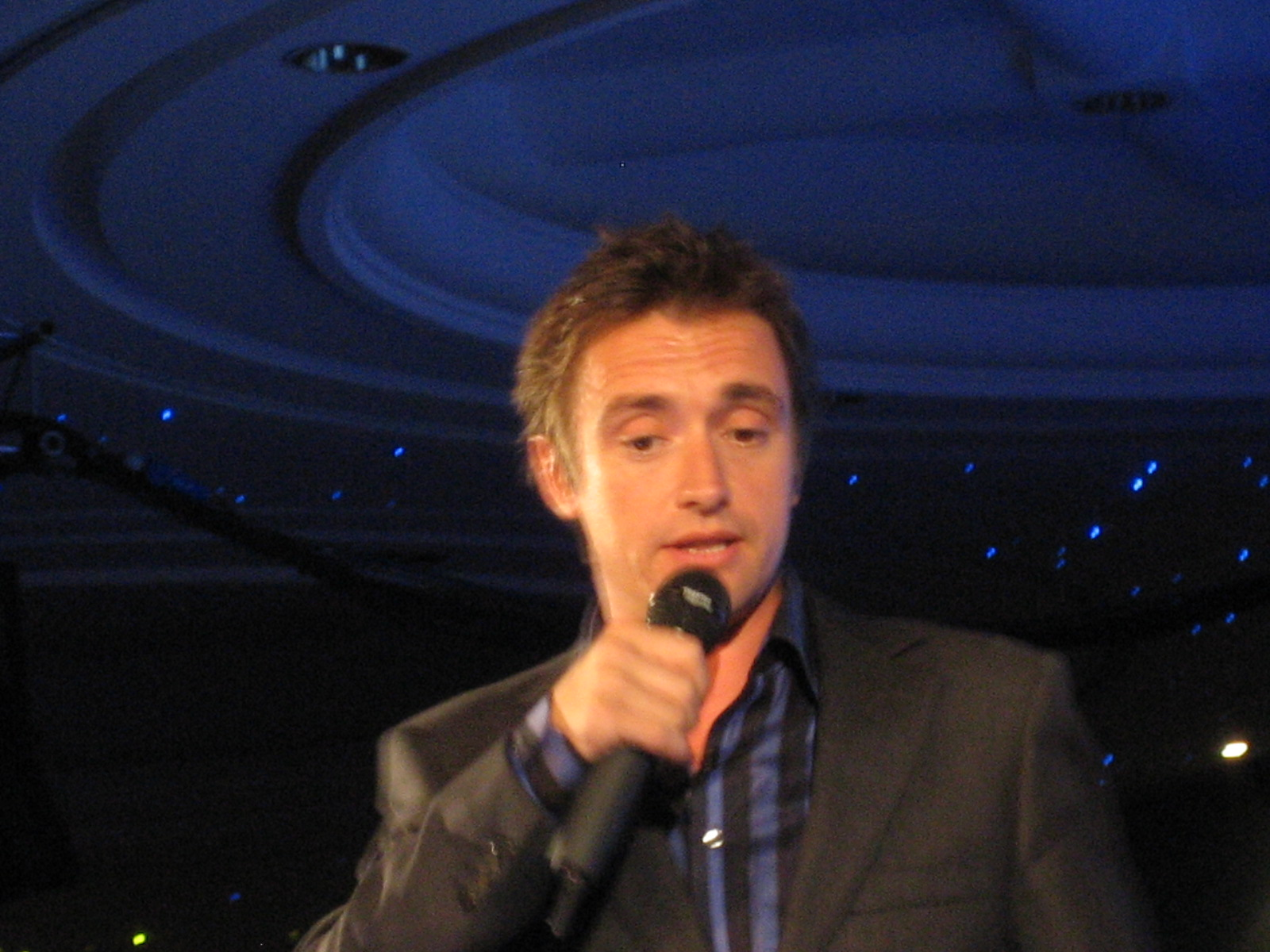
Hammond in 2006

Hammond became a presenter on Top Gear in 2002, when the show began in its revamped format presenting alongside Jeremy Clarkson and Jason Dawe. In a July 2015 interview with The Guardian, producer Andy Wilman, who worked with Hammond on Top Gear and subsequently The Grand Tour stated Hammond was close to being fired by the BBC after the first series of the 2002 revival format of Top Gear but was ultimately reprieved. Hammond has sometimes been nicknamed "The Hamster" by fans and his co-presenters due to his name and relatively small stature compared to May and Clarkson.

Following a high-speed dragster crash while filming in September 2006 near York, Hammond returned in the first episode of series 9 (broadcast on 28 January 2007) to a hero's welcome, complete with dancing girls, aeroplane-style stairs and fireworks. The show also contained images of the crash, which had made international headlines, with Hammond talking through the events of the day after which the audience broke into spontaneous applause. Hammond then requested that the crash never be mentioned on the show again, though all three Top Gear presenters have since referred to it in jokes during the news segment of the programme. He told his colleagues, "The only difference between me now and before the crash is that I like celery now and I didn't before".

Following the BBC's decision not to renew Clarkson's contract with the show on 25 March 2015, Hammond's contract expired on 31 March. In April, he ruled out the possibility of continuing to present Top Gear, commenting via Twitter that "amidst all this talk of us 'quitting' or not: there's nothing for me to 'quit'. Not about to quit my mates anyway". On 12 June 2015, the BBC confirmed that Top Gear would return with a 75-minute special, combining two unseen challenges featuring all three presenters from series 22, with studio links from Hammond and May. It aired in the UK on BBC Two on 28 June at 8 p.m, and in the United States on BBC America on 13 July at 9 p.m.

==== Vampire dragster crash ====
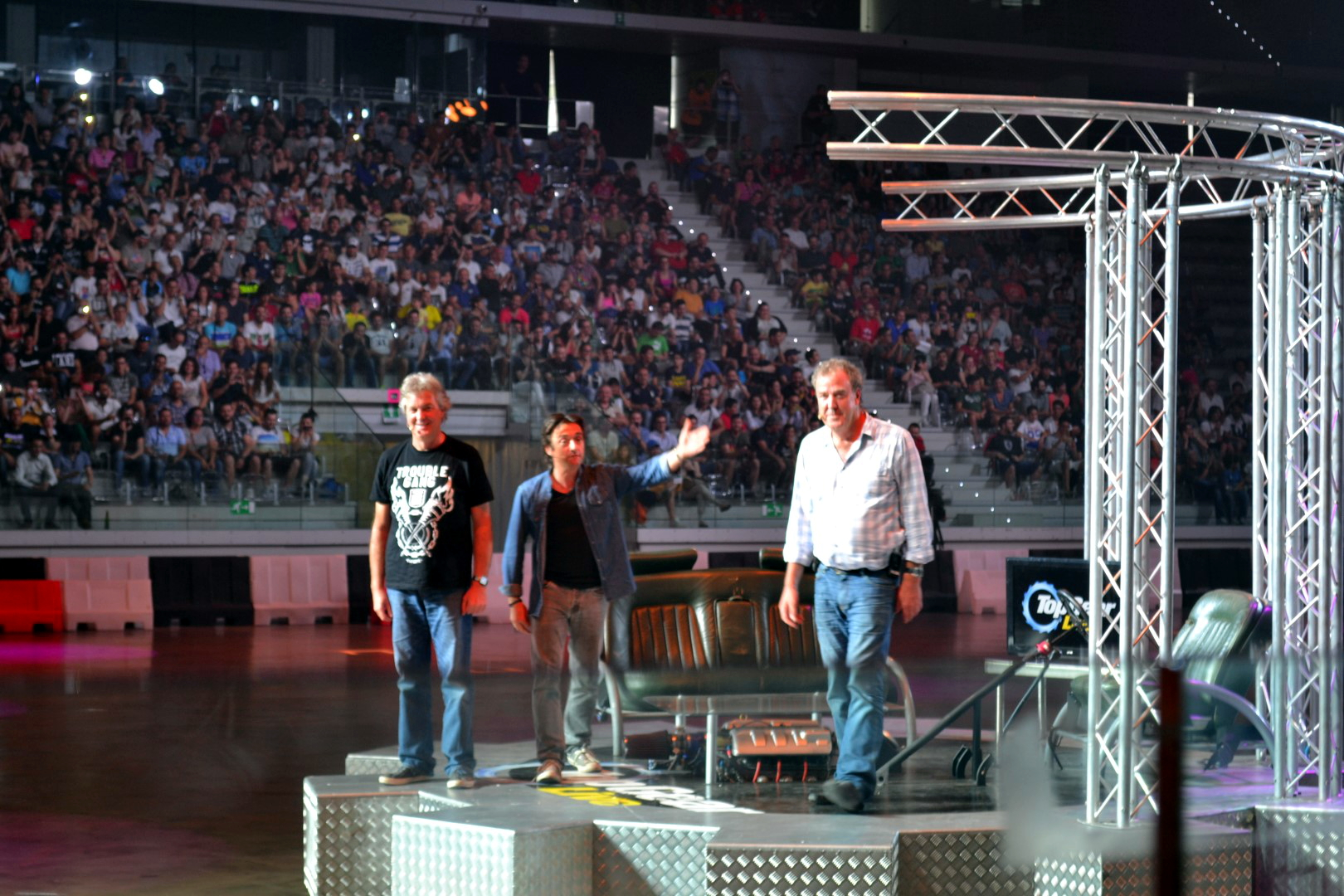
Hammond (centre) with James May (left) and Jeremy Clarkson (right) at Top Gear Live Italia in 2014

During filming of a Top Gear segment at the former RAF Elvington airbase near York on 20 September 2006, Hammond was injured in the crash of the jet-powered car he was piloting. He was travelling at 288 mph (463 km/h) at the time of the crash.

His vehicle, a dragster called Vampire, was theoretically capable of travelling at speeds of up to 370 mph (595 km/h). The vehicle was the same car that in 2000, piloted by Colin Fallows, set the British land speed record at 300.3 mph (483.3 km/h). The Vampire was powered by a single Bristol-Siddeley Orpheus afterburning turbojet engine producing 5,000 lbf (22 kN) of thrust.

Some accounts suggested that the accident occurred during an attempt to break the British land speed record, but the Health and Safety Executive report on the crash found that a proposal to try to officially break the record was vetoed in advance by Top Gear executive producer Andy Wilman, due to the risks and complexities of such a venture. The report stated: "Runs were to be carried out in only one direction along a pre-set course on the Elvington runway. Vampire's speed was to be recorded using GPS satellite telemetry. The intention was to record the maximum speed, not to measure an average speed over a measured course, and for (Hammond) to describe how it felt."

Hammond was completing a seventh and final run to collect extra footage for the programme when his front-right tyre failed, and, according to witness and paramedic Dave Ogden, "one of the parachutes had deployed but it (the car) went on to the grass and spun over and over before coming to a rest about 100 yards from us." The emergency crew quickly arrived at the car, finding it inverted and partially embedded in the grass. During the roll, Hammond's helmet had embedded itself into the ground, flipping the visor up and forcing soil into his mouth and damaging his left eye. He ultimately suffered a diffuse axonal injury. Rescuers felt a pulse and heard the unconscious Hammond breathing before the car was turned upright. Hammond was cut free with hydraulic shears, and placed on a backboard. "He was regaining consciousness at that point and said he had some lower back pain". He was then transported by the Yorkshire Air Ambulance to the neurological unit of the Leeds General Infirmary. Hammond's family visited him at the hospital along with Top Gear co-presenters James May and Jeremy Clarkson. Clarkson wished Hammond well, saying "Both James and I are looking forward to getting our 'Hamster' back", referring to Hammond by his nickname. For five weeks while Hammond was recovering in hospital, Clarkson sent a funny message to Mindy, Hammond's wife, every day to try to keep her going. Hammond thought if everyone found out, Clarkson would "die of shame" "cos it makes him look soppy".

The Health & Safety Executive report stated that "Hammond's instantaneous reaction to the tyre blow-out seems to have been that of a competent high performance car driver, namely to brake the car and to try to steer into the skid. Immediately afterwards he also seems to have followed his training and to have pulled back on the main parachute release lever, thus shutting down the jet engine and also closing the jet and afterburner fuel levers. The main parachute did not have time to deploy before the car ran off the runway." The HSE notes that, based on the findings of the North Yorkshire Police, who investigated the crash, "the accident may not have been recoverable", even if Hammond's efforts to react were as fast as "humanly possible".

Hammond made his first TV appearance since the crash on the BBC chat show Friday Night with Jonathan Ross on 22 December, just three months after the incident, where he revealed he was in a medically induced coma for two weeks and afterwards suffered from post-traumatic amnesia and a five-second memory. Despite saying he was "absolutely fixed" on the Jonathan Ross episode, in 2011, while talking to the Daily Mirror, Hammond admitted he had no memory of the interview, saying: "I lost a year. I don't remember doing the interview with Jonathan Ross or doing Top Gear Live in South Africa" showing the full impact of his brain injury five years before.

The crash was shown on an episode of Top Gear on 28 January 2007 (Series 9, Episode 1); this was the first episode of the new series, which had been postponed pending Hammond's recovery. Hammond requested at the end of the episode that his fellow presenters never mention the crash again, a request which has been generally observed, although occasional oblique references have been made by all three presenters. On The Edge: My Story, which contains first-hand accounts from both Hammond and his wife about the crash, immediate aftermath, and his recovery, was published later that year.

In February 2008, Hammond gave an interview to The Sunday Times newspaper in which he described the effects of his brain injuries and the progression of his recovery. He reported suffering loss of memory, depression and difficulties with emotional experiences, for which he was consulting a psychiatrist. He also talked about his recovery in a 2010 television programme where he interviewed Sir Stirling Moss and they discussed the brain injuries they had both received as a result of car crashes.

=== Rimac Concept One crash ===
On 10 June 2017, Hammond crashed a Rimac Concept One while filming for The Grand Tour in Hemberg, Switzerland. He was on his last run up a timed hillclimb course during the Bergrennen Hemberg event. Just after crossing the finish line, the car ran off the road, tumbled down the hill and eventually came to rest upside down 110 metres (360 ft) from the road.

Hammond remained conscious throughout and he later described the feeling of "oh god, I'm going to die", as well as being "aware of tumbling – sky, ground, sky, ground, sky, ground, sky, ground". He was airlifted to hospital, where he was diagnosed with a tibial plateau fracture in his left knee, and a plate and ten screws were surgically inserted.

Jeremy Clarkson
(@JeremyClarkson)
tweeted:

It was the biggest crash I've ever seen and the most frightening but incredibly, and thankfully, Richard seems to be mostly OK.

10 June 2017

Jeremy Clarkson and James May, fellow presenters on The Grand Tour, both witnessed the scene from afar; believing Hammond was dead, May recalled feeling a "blossoming, white-hot ball of pure, sickening horror forming in my heart", and Clarkson described his "knees turning to jelly" at the sight of the crash.

Following the ordeal, the FIA allegedly ruled that the "show runs" that Hammond and company were doing at the time of the accident violated the governing body's International Sporting Code and that the crash "acted against the interests of the sport." As a result, the Bergrennen Hemberg organizers were fined $5,138, and six-month license suspensions were imposed on race director Christian Müller and stewards Hermann Müller, Karl Marty, and Daniel Lenglet. In August of that year, Motorsport.com reported that the future of the entire event was "now in jeopardy." Despite the reports, the Bergrennen Hemberg continues to be run annually.

=== Television remarks ===
During the second episode of series sixteen of Top Gear in 2011, Hammond suggested that no one would ever want to own a Mexican car, since cars are supposed to reflect national characteristics and so a Mexican car would be "lazy, feckless, flatulent, overweight, leaning against a fence, asleep, looking at a cactus with a blanket with a hole in the middle on as a coat." Hammond finished with the remark "I'm sorry, but can you imagine waking up and remembering you're Mexican?!" The comments prompted Mexico's ambassador in London, Eduardo Medina-Mora Icaza, to lodge an official complaint to the BBC. Demanding an apology from the BBC, the ambassador stated: "These offensive, xenophobic and humiliating remarks only serve to reinforce negative stereotypes and perpetuate prejudice against Mexico and its people." The BBC defended the broadcast of this segment on the grounds that such national stereotyping was a "robust part" of traditional British humour.

In December 2016, in reference to the interior styling of a Volvo S90, co-presenter Clarkson joked that "the only problem is that in one of those, you couldn't enjoy a chocolate Magnum ice cream" – to which Hammond responded: "It's all right, I don't eat ice cream. It's something to do with being straight." It has been speculated that the joke was written as a reference to a Kingis ice cream advert in Finland, where that episode of The Grand Tour was filmed. LGBTQ+ rights campaigner Peter Tatchell who was unaware of the reference, accused Hammond of "pandering to prejudice", adding that "it's a perverse world when everyday pleasures like ice cream becomes the butt of homophobic innuendo." A spokesperson for UK LGBTQ+ rights charity Stonewall stated that "Hammond's choice of words were not just ridiculous, but chosen purposefully to mock and belittle." A year later, in an interview with The Times, Hammond stated: "Look, anyone who knows me knows I wasn't being serious, that I'm not homophobic. Love is love, whatever the sex of the two people in love... It may be because I live in a hideously safe and contained middle-class world, where a person's sexuality is not an issue." In an interview with Newsweek Today, Hammond denied making homophobic comments, and refused to apologise for the remarks: "I entirely reject any criticism of me being anti-gay. That's just not the case."

=== Other television work ===
Early in his career, as well as his radio work, Hammond presented a number of daytime lifestyle shows and motoring programmes such as Motor Week on Men & Motors.

In 2003, Hammond became the first presenter of Brainiac: Science Abuse; he was joined by Jon Tickle and Charlotte Hudson in series 2. After the fourth series it was announced that Hammond was no longer going to present the Sky1 show after he signed an exclusive deal with the BBC. Vic Reeves took his place as main presenter for the show's final two series.

He presented the Crufts dog show in 2005, the 2004 and 2005 British Parking Awards, and has appeared on School's Out, a quiz show on BBC One where celebrities answer questions about things they learned at school. He has also presented The Gunpowder Plot: Exploding the Legend. Along with his work on Top Gear, he presented Should I Worry About...? on BBC One andTime Commanders on BBC Two. He was also a team captain on the BBC Two quiz show, Petrolheads, in which a memorable part was one where Hammond was tricked into bumping his classic Ferrari while trying to parallel park blindfolded in another car. In July 2005, Hammond was voted one of the top 10 British TV talents.

In 2006, Hammond fronted the Richard Hammond's 5 O'Clock Show with his co-presenter Mel Giedroyc. The programme, which discussed a wide range of topics, was shown every weekday on ITV between 17:00 and 18:00. He presented Richard Hammond and the Holy Grail in 2006. During the special, he travelled to various locations around the world, including the Vatican Secret Archives, exploring the history of the Holy Grail.

As part of Red Nose Day 2007, Hammond stood for nomination via a public telephone vote, along with Andy Hamilton and Kelvin MacKenzie, to be a one-off co-presenter of BBC Radio 4's Woman's Hour on 16 March 2007. However, he was defeated by Hamilton. In April 2007, Hammond presented a one-off special on BBC Radio 2 for Good Friday followed by another in August 2007 for the bank holiday. Hammond recorded an interview with the famed American stuntman Evel Knievel, which aired on 23 December 2007 on BBC Two, and was Knievel's last interview before his death on 30 November 2007.

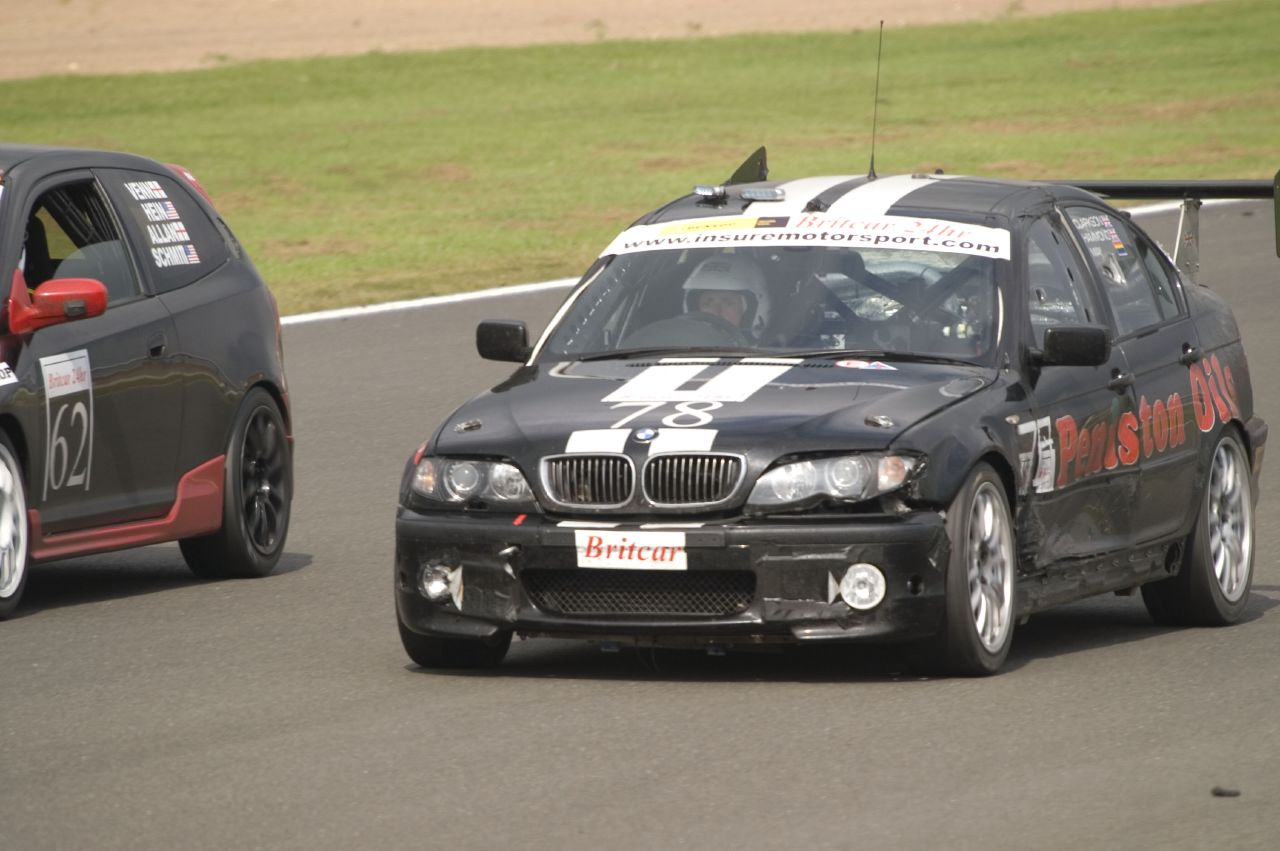
Hammond driving a diesel BMW 3 Series in the 2007 Britcar 24 Hours, as part of an episode of Top Gear

In September 2008, Hammond presented the first episode of a new series; Richard Hammond's Engineering Connections on the National Geographic Channel. In this show, Hammond discovered how the inventions of the past, along with assistance from nature, help designers today. Episodes include the building of the Airbus A380, Taipei 101 and the Keck Observatory. Series 2 of Richard Hammond's Engineering Connections began in May 2010 and has included the building of the Wembley Stadium and the Sydney Opera House.

Hammond appeared in an advertisement for Morrisons supermarkets in 2008, and joined the cast of TV show Ashes To Ashes for a special insert on the 2008 Children in Need special.

While in New Zealand for Top Gear Live 2009, Hammond filmed several television commercials for Telecom New Zealand's new XT UTMS mobile network. Telecom claimed that the new network was "faster in more places", compared to its competitors and its existing CDMA network. After the network suffered three highly publicised outages in late 2009 and early 2010, Hammond became the butt of a joke when he did not return to New Zealand for Top Gear Live 2010. His fellow Top Gear co-hosts said he was too embarrassed to come back to New Zealand, and in a supposed live feed back to Hammond, the feed suddenly drops out as the "XT Network had crashed". Hammond was later given the right of reply to his colleagues during an interview with Marcus Lush on RadioLIVE's breakfast show in New Zealand.

Hammond hosted the UK version of the US series Wipeout, called Total Wipeout for BBC One. It took place in Argentina, and was co-presented by Hammond and Amanda Byram. Hammond presented and performed the voiceover for the clips in a London studio, and Byram was filmed at the obstacle course in Buenos Aires. The series was cancelled at the end of 2012.

Hammond presented a science-themed game show for children, Richard Hammond's Blast Lab which aired on BBC Two and CBBC. In March 2010, Hammond presented a three-episode series called Richard Hammond's Invisible Worlds, which looked at things too fast for the naked eye to see, things that are beyond the visible spectrum (e.g., ultraviolet and infra-red light), as well as microscopic things. Since February 2011, Hammond has presented an online technology series Richard Hammond's Tech Head. In July 2011, Hammond presented a two-part natural science documentary Richard Hammond's Journey to the Centre of the Planet, focused on Earth geology and plate tectonics.

One of Hammond's lesser known television roles was as presenter of the BBC Two gameshow Time Commanders, a sophisticated warfare simulator which used a modified version of Creative Assembly's Rome: Total War game engine.

In April 2012, Hammond hosted a BBC America programme titled Richard Hammond's Crash Course, which was also shown in the UK from September 2012 on BBC Two. In May 2012, Hammond co-presented an animal documentary for BBC One called Planet Earth Live alongside Julia Bradbury. The programme recorded animals living in extreme conditions. In June 2014, Hammond presented a scientific fourteen part series on National Geographic Channel titled Science of Stupid which focused on the application of physics in everyday life. In December, Hammond presented a three-part science documentary for BBC One called Wild Weather with Richard Hammond which focuses on the hidden world of our Earth's extreme weather system.

In September 2015, Hammond presented a two-part documentary for Sky 1 called Richard Hammond's Jungle Quest, supported by Sky Rainforest Rescue.

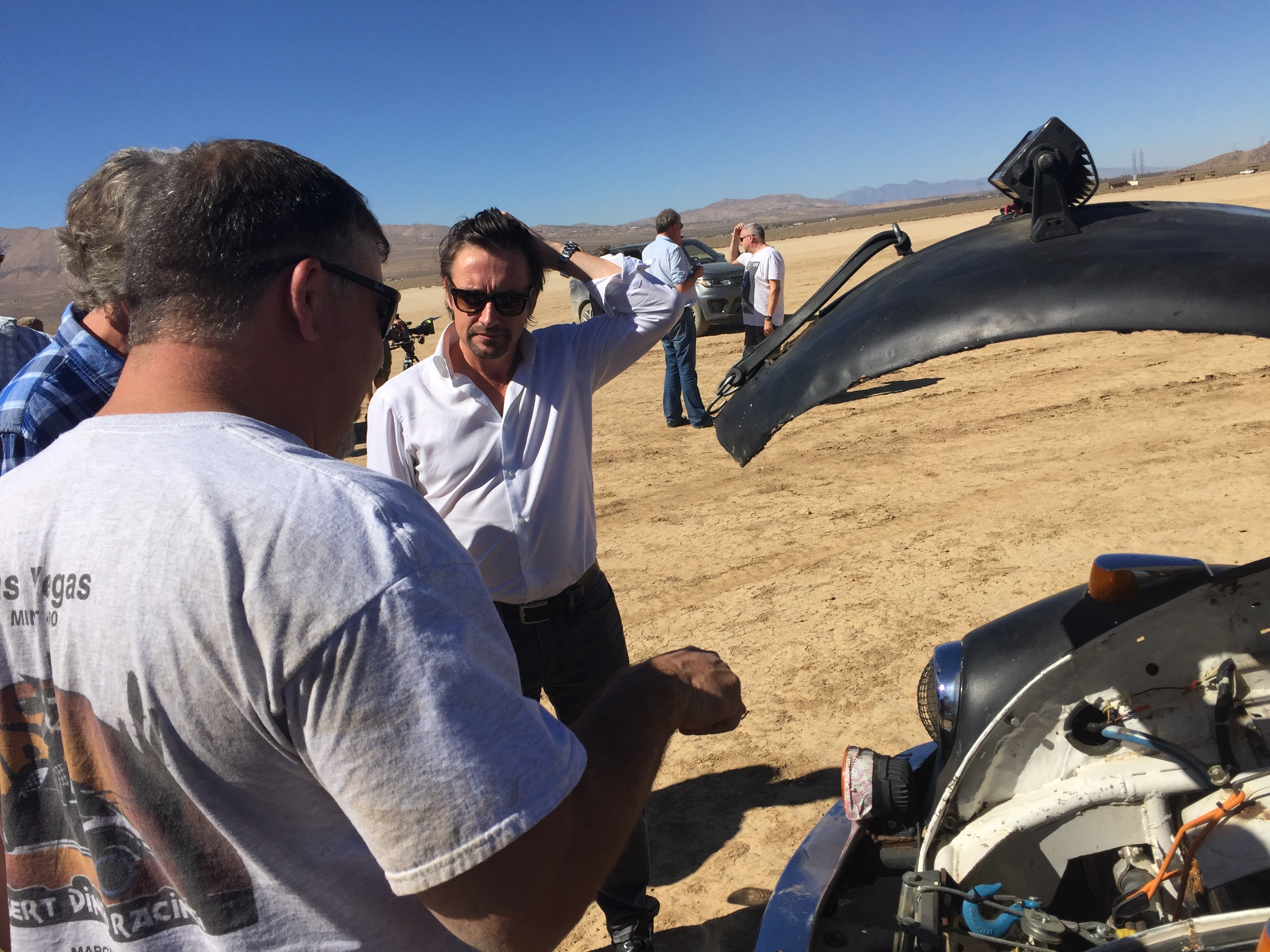
Hammond in 2016, during filming for The Grand Tour

In March 2017, whilst filming for The Grand Tour episode Feed the world in Mozambique, Hammond frequently fell off his motorbike due to the poor roads. On one occasion he reportedly hit his head and was knocked unconscious. During the season finale of The Grand Tour season three, Hammond, James May and Jeremy Clarkson announced the current format was coming to the end and later announced that there would be two more seasons of specials, without the tent or live audience.

In January 2021, Hammond starred alongside MythBusters' Tory Belleci in The Great Escapists, a fictional six-episode adventure series for Amazon, which was produced by Chimp Productions. The series stranded the pair on a deserted island where they used the resources they could find to build the means to survive.

Hammond announced on Twitter on 21 June 2021 that he would be making a show with Discovery+, Richard Hammond's Workshop, about the restoration of old cars. Its first episode has been shown on 18 October 2021 with a total of 26 episodes in three seasons.

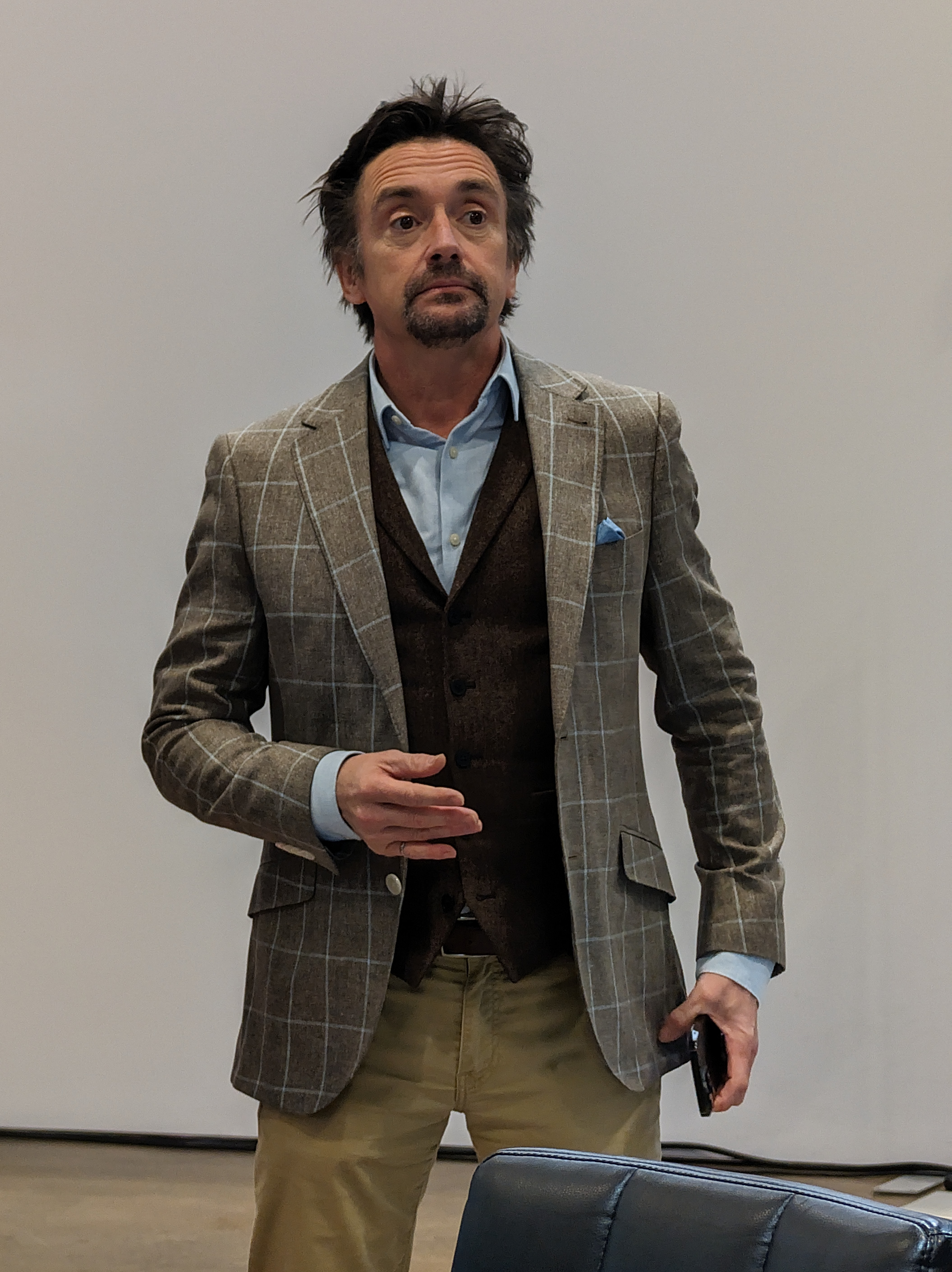
Hammond in Toronto at 2024 Canadian International AutoShow

=== Beverage production ===
On 27 June 2025, Richard Hammond released his English whisky and English Gin collection which was produced in collaboration with Hawkridge distillery and includes Iron Ridge single malt whisky and Hammond's Ratio London Dry Gin. Hammond's branch into alcoholic beverages follows his colleagues May who released James Gin and Clarkson who owns the Hawkstone collection consisting of lager, cider, stout and vodka.

== Personal life ==
Hammond married Amanda "Mindy" Hammond (née Etheridge), a columnist for the Daily Express, in May 2002, after they first met while working at a PR firm in London. They have two daughters born in 2001 and 2004. In January 2025, Hammond announced that he and his wife were separating after 28 years together.

It was a friend who first gave Hammond his nickname Hamster. The nickname stuck, especially on Top Gear due to his name and relatively small stature compared to May and Clarkson.

He and his family adopted TG, the official Top Gear dog, after it became apparent that the labradoodle was afraid of cars. TG died at age 11 in January 2017.

Hammond plays bass guitar, on which he accompanied the other Top Gear presenters when they performed alongside Justin Hawkins on Top Gear of the Pops for Comic Relief in 2007.

He likes to ride his bicycle, scooter, or motorbike in cities, for which he is mocked by Clarkson.

In 2010, Hammond was the president of the 31st Herefordshire Country Fair held at Hampton Court in Hope under Dinmore. His involvement caused unprecedented attendance with "nearly 15,000 people" drawn to the event to meet the presenter.

In March 2012, Hammond passed his B206 LST helicopter licence and has since owned a Robinson R44 Raven II helicopter.

On 9 February 2025, Hammond announced on his podcast that his father had died.

In July 2026, Hammond was charged with two instances of speeding in December 2025. He was fined £999, in addition to other legal costs and victim surcharges and was given seven penalty points on his licence.

=== Residences ===
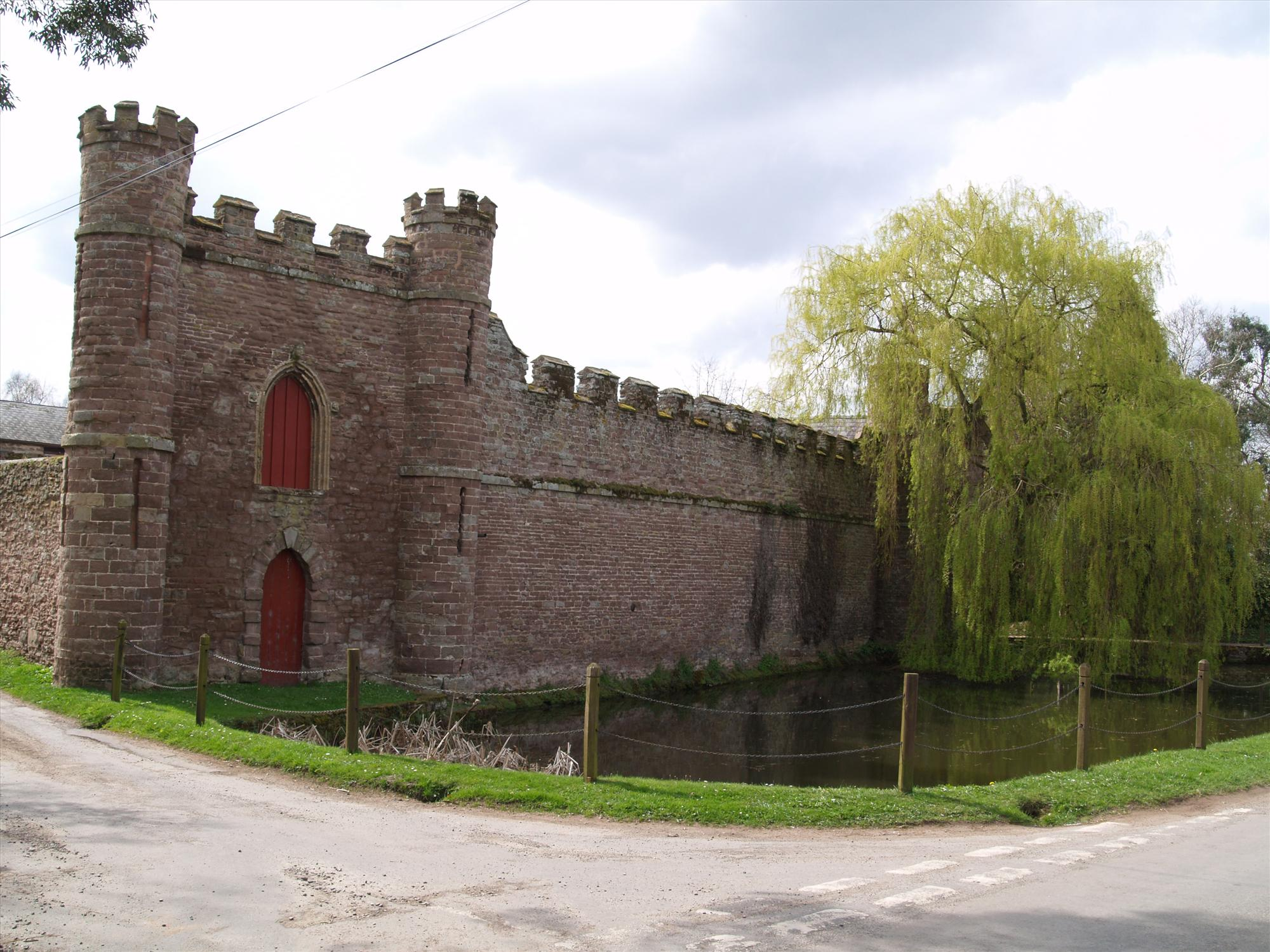
Bollitree Castle in Weston under Penyard

The Hammond family live in a mock castle in Herefordshire, and they also have an apartment in London. In an interview with The Sunday Times in February 2008, it was reported that Hammond had moved briefly from Gloucestershire to Buckinghamshire, then back again, because he missed the country life.

In October 2012, it was reported he had spent over £2 million buying Bollitree Castle which is situated near Weston under Penyard, Ross-on-Wye.

Hammond lives at a 19th-century Georgian mansion in Llanwenarth, near Abergavenny, Wales, which he bought in November 2025. Renovation of the property has been permitted alongside "appropriate measures" to prevent harm to a number of bat species.

== Vehicle ownership ==
=== Cars ===
Hammond owns or has owned many different cars. These include:

- 1929 Ford Model A
- 1933 Riley Alpine Tourer
- 1934 Morgan 3-Wheeler
- 1942 Ford GPW
- 1956 Land Rover Series 1, Undergoing restoration
- 1958 Jaguar XK150
- 1962 Jaguar E-Type Roadster Mk1
- 1962 Opel Kadett, bought in 2023 from a seller who like Oliver was originally from Johannesburg. He has since named it Olivia
- 1962 Opel Kadett Estate known as "Ultimate Estate Car" Bought in 2024 from Mathersons Auctions.
- 1963 Opel Kadett, a car he bought for Top Gear's Botswana special. He named the car Oliver and had it shipped from Botswana to the UK
- 1968 Ford Mustang GT 390 in Highland Green
- 1971 Buick Riviera which he used in Series 4, Episode 3 (Lochdown) of The Grand Tour. The car is customised with a big supercharger and a rear wing modelled from a Plymouth Superbird
- 1972 MGB GT, a car he bought for a classic car challenge featured in his last episode of Top Gear, which he subsequently kept
- 1979 MG Midget
- 1979 Ford Escort RS2000 MkII, his first restoration project for his workshop which initially sold for £33K at auction but bought it back after the new owner had registration issues
- 1987 Land Rover Defender-110, known as "Buster" which he spent over £70,000 rebuilding in 2008.
- 1999 Jaguar XJR (X308) with the supercharged Jaguar AJ-V8 engine, a car he bought in the 2000s, sold, and then bought back in 2022.
- 2003 Subaru Impreza WRX STI V Limited Edition, which he used in Series 5, Episode 1 (A Scandi Flick) of The Grand Tour. The car was tuned to 356bhp and given a Martini Livery, which was later removed after filming.
- 2005 Chevrolet SSR which he used in Series 5, Episode 2 (Eurocrash) of The Grand Tour.
- 2008 Morgan 4/4 which he originally bought as a present for his father, but inherited it after his death in 2024
- 2012 Land Rover Defender. With custom tuning by Bowler Manufacturing
- 2016 Ford Mustang convertible in white with black Shelby stripes, which he bought as a Christmas present for his wife.
- 2021 Ford Ranger
- Land Rover 110 Station Wagon, which was christened "Wallycar" by his eldest daughter and has been owned by him twice.
- Land Rover Discovery 4 SDV6 HSE
- Jaguar XK120 currently undergoing restoration.
- 2023 Ram 1500 TRX
- 2023 Porsche 911 Turbo S
- 2025 Porsche Taycan 4S Cross Turismo

Cars previously owned by Hammond:

- 1931 Lagonda 2-litre Supercharged.
- 1959 Bentley S2, sold in 2021
- 1969 Dodge Charger R/T
- 1969 Porsche 911T, sold in 2021
- 1976 Toyota Corolla liftback, which was his first car.
- 1982 Porsche 911 SC (sold in the mid-2000s)
- 1985 Land Rover Range Rover Classic which he later sold.
- 1994 BMW 850Ci, which was used to race against Clarkson's Mercedes CL600, which they both bought on Top Gear to prove that one could purchase second-hand V12 cars which were a better buy than the Nissan Pixo (Britain's cheapest new car at the time) for less money. He sold this after a week on the challenge.
- 1994 Porsche 928, purchased in 2004 for the purpose of daily driving. He later sold the car.
- 1996 Fiat Barchetta, which he revealed that he had previously owned in the Middle East Special when explaining his choice of the Barchetta for the challenge.
- 1997 Ferrari 550 Maranello, which he mentioned in Top Gear as the car he regretted selling.
- 1999 Lotus Esprit 350 Sport, sold in 2021
- 2006 Porsche 911 (997) Carrera S. He sold it in 2013 following the announcement of the GT3.
- 2010 Fiat 500C TwinAir, which he discussed purchasing during Series 18 of Top Gear. It is unknown when he sold it.
- 2008 Dodge Challenger SRT-8 which was purchased in the United States on a Series 12 episode of Top Gear. Later he sold it.
- 2009 Aston Martin DBS Volante, which he purchased for £175,000. Hammond later sold the car.
- 2009 Morgan Aeromax, in which he was involved in a car accident on 9 August 2009. He later sold it.
- 2009 Lamborghini Gallardo LP560-4 Spyder which he purchased in 2010. He later sold it in 2012.
- 2013 Porsche 911 GT3, which he discussed purchasing during Series 21 of Top Gear. This car was subsequently recalled because of multiple reports of the cars catching fire and he sold it in 2016.
- 2015 Porsche 911 GT3 RS, which he purchased on 17 April 2016.
- 2020 Morgan Plus Six The car was later destroyed in a flood on Christmas Eve and subsequently crushed.
- VW camper van, which was customised in pink for his daughters.

=== Motorcycles ===
Hammond is a keen motorcyclist, having ridden for over 30 years. He owns or has owned many different motorcycles including:

- 1925 Sunbeam Model A, with an asthmatic side-valve 350cc single-cylinder engine, a hand-shift three-speed gearbox, a manual oil pump, acetylene gas lights and no milometer
- 1929 BMW R52
- 1935 Indian
- 1946 Indian Chief
- 1947 Harley Davidson
- 1951 BMW R51, with a 600cc conversion, a Hoske tank and cut down mudguards
- 1959 Norton Dominator
- 1961 Triumph Bonneville T120C
- 1962 Triumph Bonneville
- 1970s Moto Guzzi V7 Sport
- 1974 Kawasaki Z900
- 1976 BMW R90S, which is an "[i]rresistible low mileage example of BMWs first attempt at a sportsbike. The tank's been repainted, but the rest is original."
- 1976 Honda Gold Wing
- 1976 Yamaha FS-1E
- 1981 BMW R100RT, which Hammond bought "when some friends, including James May, started a thing called the Crap Motorcycle Camping Club of GB. [...] It's called Eric, after the previous owner and it's done 105,000 miles".
- 1988 BMW R100GS
- 1990 BMW K1, with a unique BMW Motorsport inspired paintjob
- 1990 BMW K100RS, which has a batch painted by Dream Machine in BMW Motorsport colours to celebrate Nick Jeffries finishing 8th in the 1984 Production TT on one
- 1991 Suzuki GSX-R1100. In an interview for Bike Magazine in 2014, Hammond stated: "When I was a kid I saw a GSX-R 1100 being filled up in a petrol station. I thought it was amazing. I know this isn't the collectable slab-sided one, but I don't care."
- 1992 Kawasaki KR1-S
- 1992 Kawasaki ZXR-750. In a Bike Magazine interview, Richard stated: "I just love the hoses from the fairing ducts to the engine. I remember seeing these in Mick Staiano Motorcycles in Harrogate and dreaming of owning one."
- 1998 Ducati 916 SPS Fogarty Replica
- 2012 BMW R1200RT, which is according to Richard "[t]he best bike in the world." In 2014, he told Bike Magazine: "I love to hustle on the RT. It's done 8000 commuting miles and is used as a tool."
- 2014 Norton Commando 961 SE
- Bimota SB8R
- Bimota YB9
- Brough Superior SS80 period race replica
- Brough Superior SS100
- Ducati 900 Super Sport Desmo
- Honda CBX
- Honda SS50. In 2014, Richard told Bike Magazine that the Honda had been disassembled and was being restored by his daughter.
- Moto Guzzi Daytona 1000
- Suzuki GS1000
- Vespa GTS 300 Super Sport scooter
- Vincent Black Shadow
- Yamaha Virago

Motorcycles no longer owned by Hammond:

- BMW R1150GS
- Honda CBR1000F
- Honda CBX750F
- Honda MTX50, which was his first motorcycle.
- Honda NSR125R
- Honda XL100
- Kawasaki GP100
- Kawasaki ZZR600
- 1976 Kawasaki Z900. A 40th birthday present from his wife. Sold in 2021.
- 1977 Moto Guzzi Le Mans (Mk1). "I've always wanted a Guzzi. They've got a tractor-like quality. This one is fitted with a period accessory fairing from Apple Motorcycles", Hammond said in an interview for Bike Magazine. Sold in 2021.
- 2019 Norton Dominator Street. Hammond's 50th birthday present. Sold in 2021.
- 1927 Sunbeam Model 2. The first ever vintage vehicle owned by Hammond. Sold in 2021.
- Suzuki GSX-R750WP
- 1929 Velocette KSS. Sold in 2021.

=== Other vehicles ===
Furthermore, Hammond owns or has owned the following vehicles:

- 2005 Robinson R44 Raven II helicopter
- John Deere 6210 SE tractor
- 2022 Ford Transit (used for his restoration company)

=== Sale of vehicles ===
Hammond has stated that he has sold off many of his vehicles to assist in the funding of his workshop, The Smallest Cog.

Hammond often stored his vehicles at his mock-castle home as well as a unit in Herefordshire. The use of one of these units is being used for The Smallest Cog as a 'reception area' for cars awaiting restoration.

== Charity work ==
Hammond is an ambassador of UK charity for children with brain injury and neuro-disability The Children's Trust.

On 29 September 2013, terminally-ill eight-year-old Emilia Palmer was driven by Hammond in a pink Lamborghini Aventador Roadster (newly repainted for the occasion). Hammond flew his Robinson R44 helicopter, G-OHAM, to Shobdon Airfield in Herefordshire, then picked Palmer up from her home in Kimbolton, Herefordshire and drove her back to the airport for a high-speed run on the main runway. The event was arranged at short notice by Rays of Sunshine.

== Filmography ==
=== Television ===
| Year | Title | Role |
|---|---|---|
| 1998–2002 | Motor Week and Car File (Men & Motors TV series) | Presenter |
| 2002–2015, 2021 | Top Gear | Presenter |
| 2003 | Top Gear: Back in the Fast Lane | Presenter |
| 2003 | Ready Steady Cook | Contestant |
| 2003–2006 | Brainiac: Science Abuse | Presenter, co-producer |
| 2004–2005 | Crufts | Presenter |
| 2004–2005 | Should I Worry About...? | Presenter |
| 2005 | The Gunpowder Plot: Exploding the Legend | Presenter |
| 2005 | Time Commanders | Presenter |
| 2005 | Inside Britain's Fattest Man | Presenter |
| 2006 | Richard Hammond's 5 O'Clock Show | Presenter |
| 2006 | Petrolheads | Contestant |
| 2006 | School's Out | Contestant |
| 2006 | Richard Hammond: Would You Believe It? | Presenter |
| 2006 | Richard Hammond and the Holy Grail | Presenter |
| 2006 | Battle of the Geeks | Presenter |
| 2007 | Last Man Standing | Narrator |
| 2007 | Helicopter Heroes | Narrator |
| 2007 | Richard Hammond Meets Evel Knievel | Presenter |
| 2008 | BBC Timewatch | Narrator |
| 2008, 2010 | Sport Relief | Presenter |
| 2008–2012 | Richard Hammond's Engineering Connections | Presenter |
| 2009 | Top Gear: Uncovered | Presenter, co-producer |
| 2009–2011 | Richard Hammond's Blast Lab | Presenter, co-producer |
| 2009–2012 | Total Wipeout | Presenter |
| 2010 | Richard Hammond's Invisible Worlds | Presenter |
| 2010 | Hammond Meets Moss | Presenter |
| 2010 | Top Gear: Apocalypse | Presenter |
| 2011 | Richard Hammond's Journey to the Centre of the Planet | Presenter |
| 2011 | Richard Hammond's Journey to the Bottom of the Ocean | Presenter |
| 2011 | Top Gear: At the Movies | Presenter |
| 2011 | Richard Hammond's Tech Head | Presenter |
| 2012 | Richard Hammond's Crash Course | Presenter |
| 2012 | Planet Earth Live | Presenter |
| 2012 | Richard Hammond's Miracles of Nature | Presenter |
| 2012 | Top Gear: 50 Years of Bond Cars | Presenter |
| 2013 | Richard Hammond's Secret Service | Presenter |
| 2013 | Hammond meets Moss | Presenter |
| 2013 | Take Two with Phineas and Ferb | Guest |
| 2013 | Top Gear: The Perfect Road Trip | Presenter, writer |
| 2013 | How to Build a Planet | Presenter |
| 2014 | Phineas and Ferb | Nigel (voice) |
| 2014 | Wild Weather With Richard Hammond | Presenter |
| 2014 | Top Gear: The Perfect Road Trip 2 | Presenter |
| 2014–2015 | Science of Stupid | Presenter |
| 2015 | Richard Hammond's Jungle Quest | Presenter |
| 2015 | Would I Lie to You? | Himself (guest) |
| 2016–2024 | The Grand Tour | Presenter |
| 2020 | Richard Hammond's Big | Presenter |
| 2021 | The Great Escapists | Himself (fictionalized version) |
| 2021–present | Richard Hammond's Workshop | Presenter |
| 2022 | Richard Hammond's Brain Reaction | Presenter |
| 2022 | Richard Hammond's Crazy Contraptions | Presenter |
| 2022 | Britain's Beautiful Rivers with Richard Hammond | Presenter |
| 2025 | The Not Very Grand Tour | Presenter |
| 2025 | Clarkson's Farm | Himself (uncredited guest) |
| 2026 | The Grand-ish Tour | Presenter |
| 2026 | The Grand Tour | Guest |

=== Video games ===
| Year | Title | Role |
|---|---|---|
| 2013 | Forza Motorsport 5 | Himself |
| 2015 | Forza Motorsport 6 | Himself |
| 2019 | The Grand Tour Game | Himself |

=== Television advertisements ===
| Year | Title | Role |
|---|---|---|
| 2008–2009 | Morrisons | Himself |
| 2017 | LeasePlan | Himself |

== Awards and honours ==
| Year | Accolade | Category | Nominated work | Result | Ref. |
|---|---|---|---|---|---|
| 2004 | National Television Awards | Most Popular Factual Entertainment Programme (shared) | Top Gear | Nominated | |
| 2005 | Television and Radio Industries Club Awards | Satellite/Digital TV Personality | | Won | |
| 2005 | Television and Radio Industries Club Awards | New TV Talent | | Won | |
| 2005 | International Emmy Awards | Non-Scripted Entertainment (shared) | Top Gear | Won | |
| 2005 | National Television Awards | Most Popular Factual Entertainment Programme (shared) | Top Gear | Nominated | |
| 2006 | Television and Radio Industries Club Awards | Satellite/Digital TV Personality | | Won | |
| 2006 | National Television Awards | Most Popular Factual Entertainment Programme (shared) | Top Gear | Won | |
| 2006 | Heat Weird Crush Awards | Heat's Weird Crush | | Won | |
| 2007 | Television and Radio Industries Club Awards | Satellite/Digital TV Personality | | Won | |
| 2007 | Royal Television Society Television Awards | Best Presenter (shared with Jeremy Clarkson and James May) | Top Gear | Nominated | |
| 2007 | National Television Awards | Most Popular Factual Entertainment Programme (shared) | Top Gear | Won | |
| 2008 | National Television Awards | Most Popular Factual Entertainment Programme (shared) | Top Gear | Won | |
| 2008 | Television and Radio Industries Club Awards | TV Entertainment Programme (shared) | Top Gear | Won | |
| 2008 | TV Quick Awards | Best Lifestyle Show (shared) | Top Gear | Won | |
| 2009 | British Academy Children's Awards | Best Presenter | Richard Hammond's Blast Lab | Won | |
| 2009 | Television and Radio Industries Club Awards | TV Entertainment Programme (shared) | Top Gear | Won | |
| 2009 | TV Quick Awards | Best Lifestyle Show (shared) | Top Gear | Won | |
| 2009 | TV Quick Awards | Best Gameshow (shared) | Total Wipeout | Nominated | |
| 2009 | TV Choice Awards | Best Lifestyle Show (shared) | Top Gear | Won | |
| 2010 | National Television Awards | Most Popular Factual Entertainment Programme (shared) | Top Gear | Nominated | |
| 2011 | National Television Awards | Most Popular Factual Entertainment Programme (shared) | Top Gear | Won | |
| 2011 | Television and Radio Industries Club Awards | TV Entertainment Programme (shared) | Top Gear | Won | |
| 2011 | TV Choice Awards | Best Factual Entertainment Show (shared) | Top Gear | Won | |
| 2012 | National Television Awards | Most Popular Factual Entertainment Programme (shared) | Top Gear | Nominated | |
| 2012 | TV Quick Awards | Best Factual Entertainment (shared) | Top Gear | Won | |
| 2012 | TV Choice Awards | Best Factual Entertainment Show (shared) | Top Gear | Won | |
| 2012 | Guinness World Records Certificate | Most widely viewed factual TV programme (shared) | Top Gear | Won | |
| 2012 | Banff World Media Festival Rockie Awards | Best Popular Science & Natural History Program (shared) | Richard Hammond's Journey to the Centre of the Planet | Won | |
| 2013 | National Television Awards | Most Popular Factual Entertainment Programme (shared) | Top Gear | Nominated | |
| 2013 | National Television Awards | Most Popular Documentary Series (shared) | Planet Earth Live | Nominated | |
| 2013 | Jackson Hole Wildlife Film Festival Awards | Best Hosted & Presenter-led Program (shared) | Richard Hammond's Miracles of Nature: Super-bodies | Won | |
| 2014 | Emmy Award | Outstanding Science and Technology Programming (shared) | Richard Hammond's How to Build a Planet | Nominated | |
| 2014 | Critics' Choice Television Award | Best Reality Series (shared) | Top Gear | Nominated | |
| 2015 | ASTRA Awards | Most Outstanding General Entertainment Program (shared) | Top Gear | Won | |
| 2015 | National Television Awards | Most Popular Factual Entertainment Programme (shared) | Top Gear | Nominated | |
| 2015 | TV Choice Awards | Best Entertainment Show (shared) | Top Gear | Nominated | |
| 2017 | Television and Radio Industries Club Awards | Original OTT Streamed (shared) | The Grand Tour | Nominated | |
| 2017 | GQ Men of the Year Awards | TV Personalities of the Year (shared) | The Grand Tour | Won | |

== Bibliography ==
Car and motorcycle books

- What Not To Drive. Weidenfeld & Nicolson. 2005. ISBN 9780297848004.
- Richard Hammond's Car Confidential. Weidenfeld & Nicolson. 2006. ISBN 9780297844457.
- Richard Hammond's Caravan Confidential. Weidenfeld & Nicolson. 2010. ISBN 9780753826713.
- A Short History of the Motorcycle. Weidenfeld & Nicolson. 2016. ISBN 9780297609902.

Children's books

- Can You Feel the Force?: Putting the Fizz Back into Physics. Dorling Kindersley. 2006. ISBN 9781405315432.
- Car Science. Dorling Kindersley. 2008. ISBN 9780756640262.
- Great Mysteries of the World. Penguin Random House. 2013. ISBN 9780370332376.
- Blast Lab: More than 30 Mind-Blasting Experiments!. Dorling Kindersley. 2009. ISBN 9780756656485.

Biographies

- On The Edge: My Story. Phoenix. 2008. ISBN 9780753823309.
- As You Do: Adventures with Evel, Oliver and the Vice-President of Botswana. Orion. 2009. ISBN 9780753825624.
- Or Is That Just Me?. Phoenix. 2010. ISBN 9780753825624.
- On the Road: Growing up in Eight Journeys – My Early Years. Weidenfeld & Nicolson. 2014. ISBN 9781780225098.

== Racing career ==
=== 2CV 24 Hour Race results ===
| Year | Team | Co-Drivers | Car | Car No. | Laps | Pos. | Ref |
|---|---|---|---|---|---|---|---|
| 2003 | (United Kingdom) BBC Top Gear | (United Kingdom) "The Stig" (United Kingdom) Simon Butler (United Kingdom) Fasta Rasta | Citroën 2CV | 24 | | 14th | |

=== Britcar 24 Hour results ===
| Year | Team | Co-Drivers | Car | Car No. | Class | Laps | Pos. | Class Pos. | Ref |
|---|---|---|---|---|---|---|---|---|---|
| 2007 | (United Kingdom) Team Top Gear | (United Kingdom) Jeremy Clarkson (United Kingdom) "The Stig" (United Kingdom) James May | BMW 330d | 78 | 4 | 396 | 39th | 3rd | |
