= The Great Escapists =

Television show

- Genre: Adventure; Serial drama
- Starring: Richard Hammond; Tory Belleci
- Country of origin: United States
- Original language: English
- No. of seasons: 1
- No. of episodes: 6

Production
- Executive producer: Gareth Cornick
- Production locations: Pearl Islands, Panama
- Camera setup: Single-camera
- Running time: 45 minutes
- Production companies: Chimp Productions; Amazon Studios

Original release
- Network: Amazon Prime Video
- Release: 29 January 2021

The Great Escapists is a British television adventure-drama series starring Richard Hammond and Tory Belleci as fictionalized versions of themselves. Stranded on a deserted island, the two have to rely on makeshift machinery to survive while trying to find a way to escape. It was first broadcast by Amazon Prime Video on 29 January 2021, to mixed reviews.

== Plot ==
Richard Hammond and Tory Belleci went on a fishing trip together, however; their boat has sunk in a storm. Stranded on an unnamed deserted island in the Pacific Ocean, the two use the remains of the boat to build makeshift machinery in order to escape the island. Just as Belleci is about to figure out a way to use the boat's sail to construct a float able to travel over high seas, Hammond secretly hides the sail, as he does not want their adventure to end prematurely. Thinking that there is no way to escape the island, Belleci resigns and the two build a large beach house that enables them to live on the island in comfort, using the island's resources for food and fresh water. While Belleci still tries to figure out ways to escape, a crazed Hammond continues to secretly sabotage all his efforts. As tensions rise between the two of them, Belleci, suspecting Hammond of sabotage, kicks him out of their beach house, starting a war between the two, where they repurpose most of their machinery into war machines and the house is largely destroyed. Ultimately, after being forced to reconcile, they build several flying machines to escape the island, the latest of which explodes, attracting South American police. The two are mistaken for drug traffickers and taken into custody. Questioned on their individual account of the story, both blame each other. In the end, they are released as no actual crime was committed, and Hammond admits to Belleci that he sabotaged their escape attempts.

== Cast ==
- Richard Hammond as a fictionalized version of himself. A British motoring journalist, television presenter and author who became famous as the host of Top Gear and later on The Grand Tour, as well as the host of the science entertainment show Brainiac: Science Abuse, .
- Tory Belleci as a fictionalized version of himself. An American television presenter and model maker who became famous as a host of the science entertainment show MythBusters.

Additionally, Joseph Balderrama and Silvana Montoya feature as two South American police officers questioning Hammond and Belleci.

== Production ==
Three years prior to filming, Hammond contacted Belleci to discuss working on a project together in an attempt to create a pop science show that had more substance. Belleci flew to London and over the next years, the concept for the show was developed. When speaking of the series, Hammond described as something entirely new, as it was a unique blend of "pop science, engineering, survival, and drama". The series was shot on location on several of the Pearl Islands off the Pacific Coast of Panama. Unlike their previous series, the show's events are entirely fictional and both star as fictionalized versions of themselves, similar to shows like Episodes. According to Belleci and Hammond, this decision was made as to not having to break the fourth wall continuously and create a more compelling narrative.

A trailer for the show was revealed on 5 January 2021, with the full show being released on Amazon Prime Video on the 29th of the same month.

== Episodes ==
No.	Title	Original release date
1	"Ship Wrecked"	29 January 2021
Hammond and Belleci go on a fishing trip, however, they end up stranded on a deserted island after their boat sinks in a storm. Using the remains of the boat, they construct several vehicles, trying to tow the ship's remains so they can build a makeshift boat. However, only one of the vehicles prove suited, albeit slow, for the task at hand. Afterwards, Hammond made a makeshift dummy called "Clarkson". Belleci attempts to use the boat's sail to build a float, however; it mysteriously goes missing. Realizing they will have to live on the island while figuring out a new way to escape, they build a makeshift beach house and a defence system, which caught a chicken Hammond names "Monster".
2	"Power Up"	29 January 2021
The duo tries to adjust to life on the island. In order to make life easier, they make several adjustments, turning their treehouse into a large mansion including a water mill to power the electricity, a lighthouse to get rescued, and several other improvements, allowing them to live on the island in more comfort. A day later, Belleci finds the missing sail and assumed they were not alone on the island.
3	"Ahoy There"	29 January 2021
Still trying to escape, the duo try to build aquatic machines to reach a nearby fishing lane Belleci believed he saw, but again their machines prove unsuited, Hammond's raft sunk, the sail Belleci used for his snapped and Hammonds "Bi-sea-cle" was too slow, until Belleci created a make-shift Paddle Steamer. When they reached the fishing lane and, after waiting four days, Hammond came to the conclusion Belleci made up the lane and, with only two pieces of wood left, were stranded at sea.
4	"Fireworks"	29 January 2021
After barely making back to the island, Hammond tries to cheer Belleci up after the paddle steamer sunk by making a party to celebcrate Fourth of July, while Belleci tries to use explosives to send a distress signal. In an attempt to sabotage his plans yet again, Hammond sets off all the fireworks while Belleci was on one of the rides. This latest attempt drives Belleci over the edge, and he kicks Hammond out of the beach house.
5	"War Games"	29 January 2021
After being kicked out of the house, a crazed Hammond declares war on Belleci. After his first attempt to attack the beach house is thwarted, he repurposes one of the vehicles as a tank and destroys large partes of the beach house, including the water mill, until Belleci drives him back with a makeshift artillery, which destroyed the tank. Nevertheless, both destroyed large parts of their constructions and resources. Afterwards, the two managed to trap themselves in two of Hammond's traps in an attempt to retrieve Clarkson.
6	"Lift Off"	29 January 2021
Realizing they have to escape the island, the duo calls for a truce after they escaped the traps. After rebuilding the beach house, Hammond spots a bird indigenous to mainland South America, they decide to build flying machines to escape. However, while they manage to build a machine that actually fly, but it couldn't make the distance to the mainland. Using thousands of condoms to build a balloon, it's explodes, because Belleci used hydrogen to make it fly, which "blew up" Clarkson, the resulting explosion attracts South American police forces, who mistake Hammond and Belleci for drug traffickers. Taken into custody and questioned, both blame each other for their situation. As no crime has been committed, they are released, and Hammond admits that it was him who hid the sail.

== Reception ==
The series received mixed reviews and holds a 60% rating on review aggregator Rotten Tomatoes.

Several reviews highlighted that the show made good use of its scientific experiments. Writing for Metro, Tilly Pearce noted that the big science set pieces were the true stars of the show and that the series as a whole was the "perfect solution to teaching kids science". However, other critics found the show's premise to be hardly believable, as it was clearly evident that there was no way the two presenters could build their machines on their own, arguing that thus "their schtick doesn't land most of the time." Writing for The Telegraph, Anita Singh also concluded that there was no way for the audience to buy into the concept of the show.

Also, the chemistry between Hammond and Belleci was positively received, with Pearce stating that Hammond's childish antics matched well with Belleci's straight man persona. Nevertheless, Pearce noted that the acting was "clearly the weakest link in the series", as both stars were not trained actors. Singh had similar sentiments, noting their "easy chemistry" that carried some of the segments, while the overall act seemed hardly believable.

Most critics centered on the weak plot of the series, which Pearce describes as "means-to-an-end" to keep the experiments together. Also, the series was found to lack direction, with Keller calling it an "odd show" that was lost between scripting and improvisation and had no clearly defined genre, with six episodes being clearly too long. Pearce also noted that there was no clear target audience recognizable, as it was unclear whether the show was aimed at adults or children. Singh had similar remarks, noting that the concept of the show was simply not working, as it was designed like a kids show, but seemingly aimed at adults.
