= Izzy Hammond =

British motoring presenter and podcaster

- Education: University of Bristol
- Occupations: Motoring presenter, podcaster
- Known for: DriveTribe, Who We Are Now
- Parents: Richard Hammond (father); Amanda Etheridge (mother)

Izzy Hammond is a British motoring presenter and podcaster. She is a presenter on the automotive YouTube channel DriveTribe and co-hosts the podcast Who We Are Now alongside her father, television presenter Richard Hammond.

== Early life and education ==
Hammond grew up in Herefordshire, England, with her younger sister Willow. She attended Malvern College before studying English literature at the University of Bristol, graduating with first-class honours.

== Career ==
Hammond began appearing in DriveTribe videos in 2023 and subsequently joined the channel's regular presenting team.

In February 2024, she began co-hosting Who We Are Now, a podcast exploring masculinity, mental health and contemporary social issues, alongside her father.

In February 2026, Hammond participated in the Formula E Evo Sessions influencer competition at the Jeddah Corniche Circuit in Saudi Arabia. She crashed during the event but escaped without injury.
