= Should I Worry About...? =

- Genre: Documentary
- Presented by: Richard Hammond
- Country of origin: United Kingdom
- No. of series: 2
- No. of episodes: 14

Production
- Running time: 30 minutes approx.

Original release
- Network: BBC One
- Release: 9 September 2004 – 18 August 2005

Should I Worry About...? is a British documentary series that aired on BBC One from 9 September 2004 to 18 August 2005. It was presented by Richard Hammond, where he looked at the science behind headline health scares. The series has been repeated on Dave.

== Episode list ==
Series 1

- Episode 1: Mobile Phones – 9 September 2004
- Episode 2: Sausages – 16 September 2004
- Episode 3: MRSA – 23 September 2004
- Episode 4: Water – 30 September 2004
- Episode 5: The Office – 7 October 2004
- Episode 6: Salmon – 14 October 2004
- Episode 7: Flying – 21 October 2004
- Episode 8: Spending – 28 October 2004

Series 2

- Episode 1: Takeaways – 14 July 2005
- Episode 2: Additives – 21 July 2005
- Episode 3: Exercise – 28 July 2005
- Episode 4: Jabs – 4 August 2005
- Episode 5: Drinking – 11 August 2005
- Episode 6: Ageing – 18 August 2005
