= Richard Hammond's Crash Course =

- Genre: Reality television
- Presented by: Richard Hammond
- Starring: Richard Hammond
- Opening theme: "Crash Course"
- Country of origin: United Kingdom
- Original language: English
- No. of seasons: 2
- No. of episodes: 14

Production
- Executive producer: Rob Fox
- Running time: 45 minutes
- Production company: BBC Worldwide

Original release
- Network: BBC America
- Release: April 16 – December 10, 2012

Richard Hammond's Crash Course is a British reality television series made for BBC America, presented by Top Gear presenter Richard Hammond. The show's first season premiered on April 16, 2012. Each episode of Season 1 follows Hammond as he is given three days to learn how to operate various pieces of heavy equipment across the United States. In Season 2, Hammond must now learn how to perform several odd jobs. A trailer for the series was posted on BBC America's official website on March 19, 2012. The series' first season began airing on BBC2 in the United Kingdom on September 2, 2012.

== Background ==
The first episode of Crash Course aired on April 16, 2012, on BBC America, following the premiere of season 18 of Top Gear. The show's first episode features Hammond learning how to operate an American Army M1A2 Abrams tank at Fort Bliss. A total of six episodes were filmed. A trailer for the show's second season was released on September 25, 2012. The second season premiered on October 22, 2012. Writing for MotorAuthority.com, Nelson Ireson described the series as being like "Dirty Jobs but centered around vehicles". Ireson also commented that the BBC appears to be capitalizing on Hammond's "notoriety" as a Top Gear presenter due to the show being the top "unscripted" show on BBC America.

== Episodes ==
=== Series overview ===
Season	Episodes	Originally released	
Season	Episodes	First released	Last released
1	6	April 16, 2012	May 21, 2012
2	8	October 22, 2012	December 10, 2012

=== Season 1 (2012) ===
No. overall	No. in series	Title	Original release date
1	1	"Abrams Tank"	April 16, 2012
Hammond travels to Fort Bliss, Texas, to learn how to operate a M1A2 Abrams Tank. Richard learns about the roles the commander, gunner, loader and driver play in operating the 68-ton vehicle, and discovers if he has what it takes to join the crew.
2	2	"Tree Harvester"	April 23, 2012
Hammond travels to Oregon, to learn how to operate a tree harvester, and a trio of powerful logging machines. The feller-buncher can cut down 1,000 trees in a day, before the log loader stacks logs and the dangle head processor strips, cuts and slices the wood. However, Richard's lumberjacking skills are put to the test before he is let loose on the vehicles, and he also learns about the importance of sustainable forestry.
3	3	"Landfill"	April 30, 2012
Hammond travels to a landfill near Denver, Colorado, and is instructed in the use of several pieces of trash-handling equipment. He later gets behind the wheel of a bulldozer, and examines the processes used to transform rubbish into ethanol.
4	4	"Striker"	May 7, 2012
Hammond travels to Dallas/Fort Worth International Airport in Texas to try out the world's most powerful fire engine, the "Striker", which boasts two water cannons and eight wheels – all of which are driven. However, before getting behind the wheel of the vehicle, he experiences the gruelling physical tests that its crew must undergo.
5	5	"Demolition"	May 14, 2012
Hammond travels to Orlando, Florida, where he visits one of America's busiest demolition companies, and is challenged to pilot a track hoe, a demolition machine and a wrecking ball. He is given the task of mastering the destructive equipment and demolishing a house with surgical precision.
6	6	"Salvage Yard"	May 21, 2012
Hammond travels to a salvage yard in Louisiana, where he gets behind the controls of machines used to break down oil rigs and select reusable material from the debris. He tries his hand at taking charge of a crane that can lift up to 150 tons, a grapple that can handle 15 tons of recyclable materials, and an electro-magnet capable of lifting 4,000 lbs – the equivalent of 20 refrigerators.

=== Season 2 (2012) ===
No. overall	No. in series	Title	Original release date
7	1	"Stuntman"	October 22, 2012
Hammond travels to Hollywood to tackle the coolest job in town — becoming a stuntman. Can Richard conquer his fear of heights, face the past while flipping a car, beat the heat when set on fire and convince other stuntmen that he can handle a proper fight scene?
8	2	"Cabbie & Comedian"	October 29, 2012
Hammond travels to New York City to discover the best job for someone who loathes gridlock – a gig as a New York City cabbie during Manhattan’s rush hour. Then, Hammond joins the comedy club scene, attempting to write a completely original set of material.
9	3	"Bullfighter & Paddle Boarder"	November 5, 2012
Hammond travels to a small-town in Texas, to find out if he can handle the heat of the rodeo ring, by learning a masterclass in the art of bullfighting. Then, Hammond travels to Maui, where he tests his paddle-boarding skills against a group of seasoned professionals.
10	4	"Indy Car Pit Crew"	November 12, 2012
Hammond travels to Sonoma, California, to see if someone, so often found behind the wheel of a car, is capable of changing a wheel in an actual IndyCar race. Can he prove to be one of the key people by training to become a professional? Or are his skills behind the wheel?
11	5	"Barber & Helicopter Test Pilot"	November 19, 2012
The Hamster is schooled on how to give a proper Harlem style haircut, Plus, he finds out what it takes to build and test fly a brand new helicopter, the R66 Turbine.
12	6	"Cattle Rancher"	November 26, 2012
Richard travels to the heart of Texas where he attempts to turn into a real-life buckaroo.
13	7	"Animal Sanctuary; Snake Wrangler"	December 3, 2012
14	8	"Rocket Scientist; Bike Messenger"	December 10, 2012

== International broadcast ==
The first series began airing in the United Kingdom on BBC Two on Sunday, September 2, 2012 at 19:15 BST, followed by a repeat showing of the second episode from series 18 of Top Gear. Episodes two and three followed on September 9 and 16, again at 19:15 on Sundays, respectively. After poor viewing figures for the Sunday night broadcast, episodes four, five and six were moved to an early morning slot on Tuesday mornings, at 00:50 GMT. The series will be broadcast in Africa from September 30, 2012, on BBC Knowledge, on DStv. In Poland, the first series began airing on August 16, 2012 on BBC Knowledge, exactly four months after the original premiere.
