= Richard Hammond's Invisible Worlds =

- Genre: Science and nature
- Presented by: Richard Hammond
- Country of origin: United Kingdom
- Original language: English
- No. of series: 1
- No. of episodes: 3

Production
- Running time: 65 minutes

Original release
- Network: BBC One
- Release: 16 March – 30 March 2010

Richard Hammond's Invisible Worlds is a BBC television documentary programme presented by Richard Hammond that features state-of-the-art camera technology used to focus on what humans cannot see with the naked eye.

== Episodes ==
No.	Title	Directed by	Original release date
1	"Speed Limits"	Gavin Maxwell	16 March 2010
2	"Out of Sight"	Dan Clifton	23 March 2010
3	"Off the Scale"	Matthew Wortman	30 March 2010

== Home media ==
The DVD and Blu-ray Discs of the series were released on 3 May 2010.
