= School's Out (TV series) =

British television series

- Genre: Game show
- Presented by: Danny Wallace
- Country of origin: United Kingdom
- Original language: English
- No. of series: 2
- No. of episodes: 14

Production
- Running time: 35 minutes
- Production company: So Television

Original release
- Network: BBC One
- Release: 5 April 2006 – 1 September 2007

School's Out is a BBC television series hosted by Danny Wallace. Based on the premise of school subjects, celebrity contestants are asked questions that they would have been asked at school.

== Rounds ==
- The General Knowledge Round – Each contestant is randomly asked four questions on any subject.
- The Timetable round – A school timetable is shown, five days with six subjects per day. Contestants pick a day and then one subject in the morning and one in the afternoon. They are then asked a question based on that subject. Five points are awarded for a single subject question and ten points for a double.
- The French Oral Round – French teacher Virginie Hopstein asks each contestant individually to answer questions she asks in French. Points out of twenty are awarded afterwards.
- The Project Round – A subject is given to the students and three questions are asked. Points are awarded for each question.
- The Music Round – Each contestant is given a recorder and has to play a part of a song when asked (from series 2 onwards)
- The Quick Fire Round – The overall winner is given a timetable similar to the one in round two. They are given a minute to get from Monday to Friday answering questions correctly to progress. They must answer one double subject along the way.

== Episodes ==
=== Series 1 (2006) ===
No. overall	No. in series	Contestant 1	Contestant 2	Contestant 3	Original release date
1	1	Richard Bacon; Runner-Up	Richard Hammond; Winner	Shelley Rudman; Last Place	5 April 2006
2	2	Matt Dawson; Winner	Mel Giedroyc; Runner-Up	Adam Woodyatt; Last Place	19 April 2006
3	3	Marcus Brigstocke; Runner-Up	James Cracknell; Winner	Myleene Klass; Last Place	26 April 2006
4	4	Sarah Cawood; Last Place	Tony Hawks; Winner	James Martin; Runner-Up	3 May 2006
5	5	Angela Griffin; Winner	Liz McClarnon; Last Place	Russell Watson; Runner-Up	10 May 2006
6	6	Natalie Cassidy; Last Place	Bonnie Langford; Winner	DJ Spoony; Runner-Up	17 May 2006

=== Series 2 (2007) ===
No. overall	No. in series	Contestant 1	Contestant 2	Contestant 3	Original release date
7	1	Rory Bremner; Winner	Patrick Kielty; Last Place	Shaun Williamson; Runner-Up	30 June 2007
8	2	Adrian Edmondson; Runner-Up	Jenni Falconer; Winner	Nick Knowles; Last Place	14 July 2007
9	3	Tina Hobley; Last Place	Graham Norton; Winner	Dominic Wood; Runner-Up	21 July 2007
10	4	Ricky Groves; Winner	Duncan James; Last Place	Sandi Toksvig; Runner-Up	28 July 2007
11	5	Jo Brand; Last Place	Hardeep Singh Kohli; Runner-Up	Dermot Murnaghan; Winner	4 August 2007
12	6	Sally Lindsay; Runner-Up	Bill Turnbull; Winner	Hannah Waterman; Last Place	11 August 2007
13	7	Matt Allwright; Runner-Up	Laurie Brett; Last Place	James Fleet; Winner	25 August 2007
14	8	Josie d'Arby; Last Place	Stephen Gately; Runner-Up	Meera Syal; Winner	1 September 2007

Matt Dawson is the highest scoring "pupil" ever, scoring 94 out of a possible 100.
