= BMW K100 =

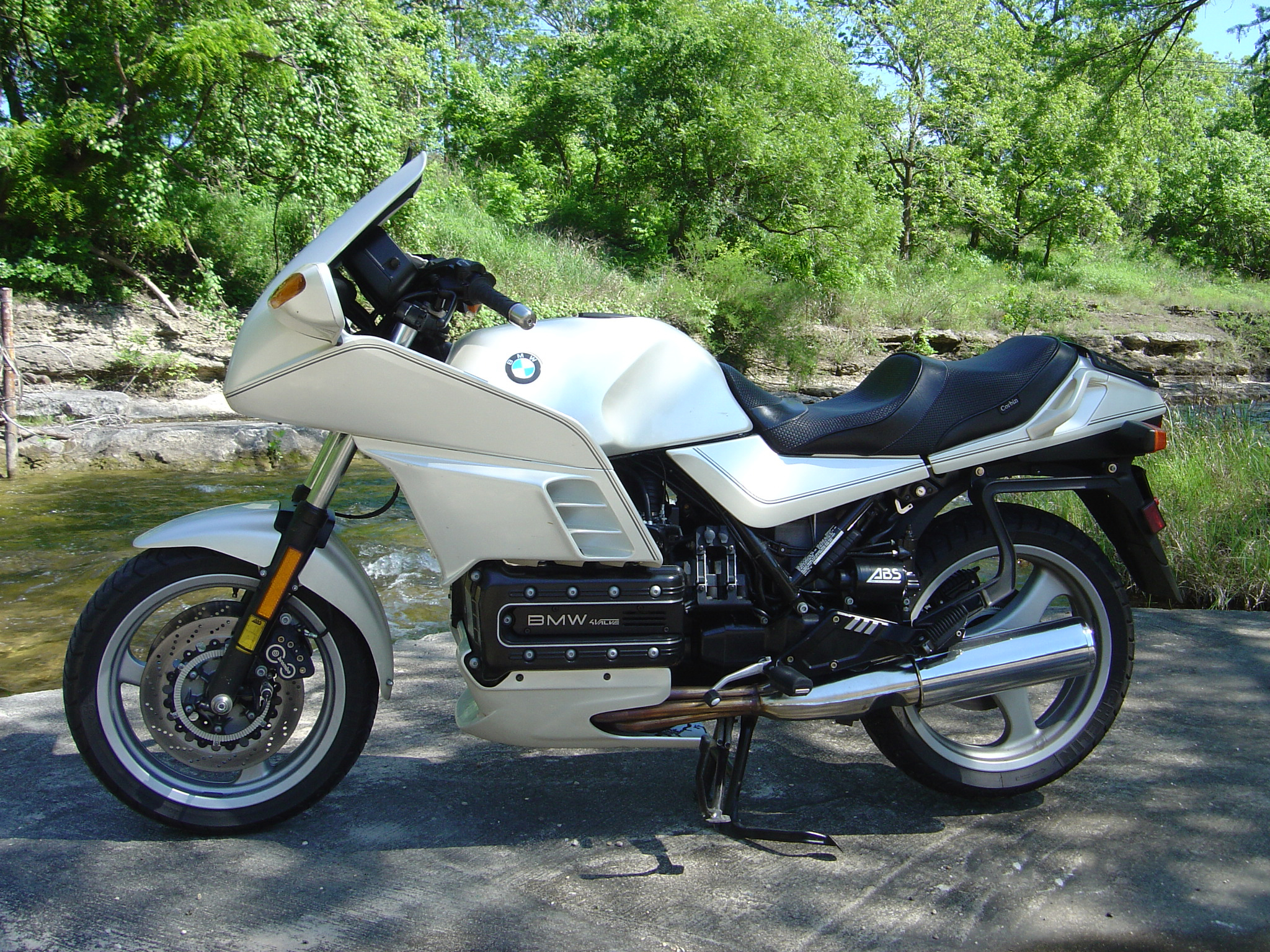
- BMW K100RS
- Manufacturer: BMW
- Also called: "Flying Brick"
- Production: 1982–1992
- Assembly: Spandau, Germany
- Class: standard, sport touring
- Engine: longitudinal DOHC I4, 987 cc (60.2 cu in)
- Bore / stroke: 67 mm × 70 mm (2.6 in × 2.8 in)
- Compression ratio: 10.2:1
- Top speed: 137 mph (220 km/h)
- Power: 90 PS (66 kW) @ 8000 rpm
- Torque: 63.3 lb⋅ft (85.8 N⋅m) @ 6000 rpm
- Ignition type: Bosch LE-Jetronic
- Transmission: 5-speed sequential manual transmission, counter-rotating clutch, shaft drive
- Frame type: tubular steel, open cradle with engine as stressed member
- Suspension: telescopic forks, single-sided swingarm
- Brakes: triple discs
- Wheelbase: 1565 mm (Unladen)
- Seat height: 800 mm
- Weight: 536 lb (243 kg) (wet)
- Turning radius: 5.1m
- Related: BMW K75; BMW K1

The BMW K100 is a family of four-cylinder 987 cc motorcycles that were manufactured by BMW from 1983 to 1992.

== Background ==
Since the 1920s, BMW had produced motorcycles having an air-cooled flat-twin boxer engine, culminating in the 980 cc BMW R100 of 1976. As the 1970s came to an end, BMW faced three problems from developing this engine further:

- Emissions regulations being developed in the United States and the European Union meant that more control was needed over the amount of fuel entering the combustion chamber. From an engineering standpoint, this was easier to achieve with more cylinders at an overall smaller displacement.
- The market-led development of bikes was leading to the Japanese factories developing smoother and quicker machines based around a four-cylinder format.
- Bike comparison in the media at the time was based around top speed, and a four-cylinder when fully developed created more power.

In combination, this meant that BMW's marketing to users of a superior bike, allowing them to price at a premium, was being quickly lost, resulting in a loss of sales and market share.

At the time, BMW, Moto Guzzi, and Harley-Davidson were the only major "high end" manufacturers that did not offer liquid-cooled engines. Competing brands, notably of Japanese manufacture, were touting the superiority of their liquid-cooled engines and had introduced low maintenance shaft-drive technology in a growing number of their models.

== Concept ==
BMW needed to develop a clean-burning four-cylinder engine quickly. While a flat-four engine would have been suited to their boxer tradition and experience, it would also give the appearance that they were copying Honda's GL1000 Gold Wing.

In 1977, Josef Fritzenwenger presented a prototype using a PSA-Renault X-Type engine from a Peugeot 104. The engine, which was installed in the 104 at a 72° angle, was laid flat in the frame with the crankshaft on the right, running parallel to the centre line of the frame. This layout, for which BMW submitted a patent application, was well suited to BMW's traditional shaft drive, needing only one 90° bevel drive to transmit power to the rear wheel. Using shaft drive with the near-vertical transverse engine preferred by the Japanese manufacturers at the time would have needed two 90° bevel drives, doubling the power lost to the inefficiency of these units. The new layout also kept the bike's centre of gravity low, which improved the bike's handling, and made space behind the front wheel available for the radiator.

== Design and development ==
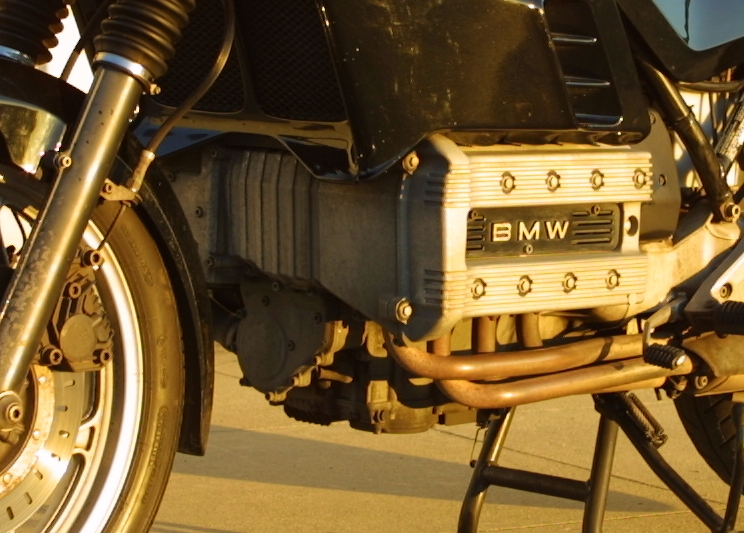
K100 engine closeup

Fritzenwenger's concept was developed by a team led by Stefan Pachernegg based on criteria set out by R. P. Michel and K. V. Gevert. Martin Probst, who had earlier worked with the development of BMW's Formula Two engine, was responsible for engine testing and development.

As an automobile manufacturer, BMW had about twenty years of experience with liquid-cooled overhead camshaft inline engines. This was carried over to the K100 engine, which used a Bosch LE-Jetronic fuel injection similar to that being introduced on their second generation 3 Series cars. Replacing the Bing carburettors traditionally used on BMW motorcycles, the fuel injection system increased power, broadened and smoothed the powerband, and reduced fuel consumption, partly by shutting off fuel under deceleration to 2000 rpm. The engine also featured a breaker-less electronic ignition system.

The engine was positioned with the crankshaft on the right-hand side of the motorcycle and the cylinder head, camshafts, injectors and spark plugs on the left-hand side. This improved access to the engine over that of a conventional design, where the crankshaft would be at the bottom and the cylinder head and associated parts would be between the engine block and the upper frame.

=== K75 ===
BMW K75
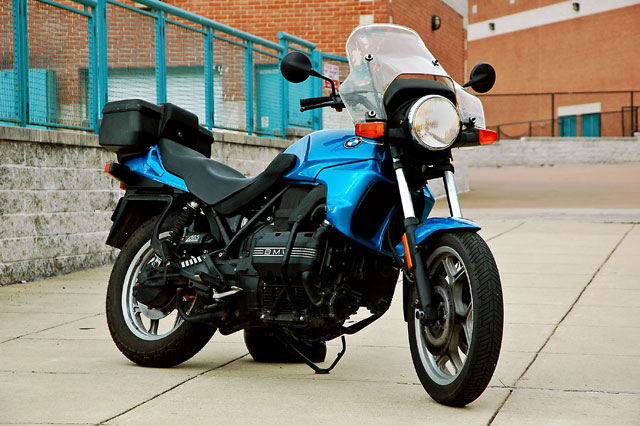
- 1993 BMW K75
- Manufacturer: BMW
- Production: 1985–1995
- Assembly: Germany
- Class: Standard
- Engine: Longitudinal DOHC I3, 740 cc (45 cu in)
- Bore / stroke: 67 mm × 70 mm (2.6 in × 2.8 in)
- Compression ratio: 11.0:1; 10.5:1
- Top speed: 131 mph (211 km/h)
- Power: 75 hp (56 kW) @ 8000 rpm
- Torque: 50 lb⋅ft (68 N⋅m) @ 6000 rpm
- Ignition type: Bosch L-Jetronic
- Transmission: 5-speed sequential manual transmission, shaft drive
- Frame type: Tubular steel, open cradle with engine as stressed member
- Suspension: Telescopic forks, single-sided swingarm
- Brakes: Dual front discs and single rear disc, or rear drum
- Rake, trail: 27.5°/3.98 in (10.1 cm)
- Wheelbase: 59.7 in (152 cm)
- Dimensions: L: 87.4 in (222 cm); W: 35.4 in (90 cm); H: 51.2 in (130 cm)
- Seat height: 31.9 in (81 cm); 29.9 in (76 cm) (low seat)
- Weight: 505 lb (229 kg) (dry); 536 lb (243 kg) (wet)
- Fuel capacity: 5.54 US gal (21.0 L)
- Fuel consumption: 59 mpg_{‑US} (4.0 l/100 km)
- Related: BMW K100; BMW K1

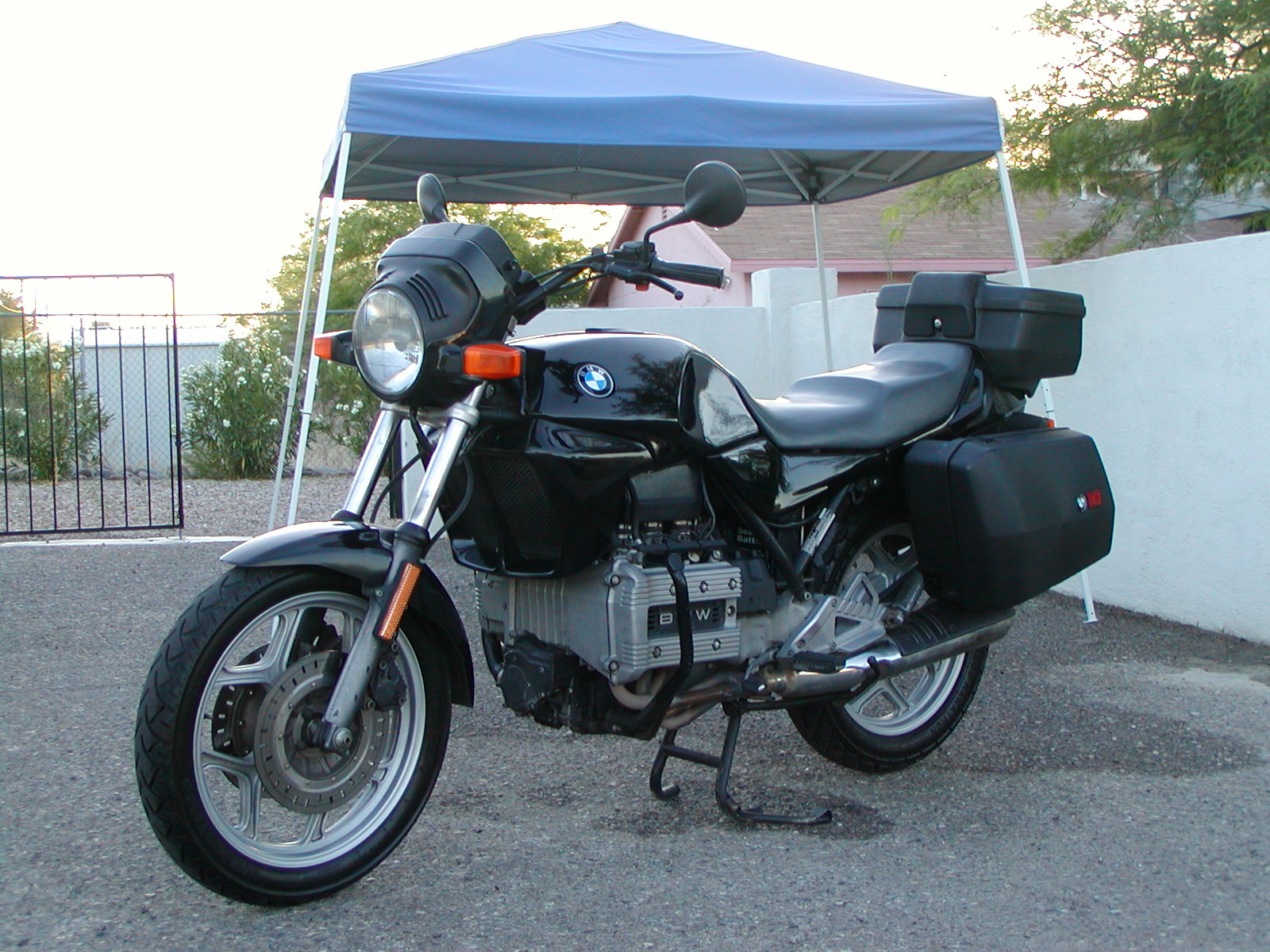
1987 BMW K75T

The BMW K75 is a standard motorcycle produced by BMW Motorrad from 1985 to 1995.

The three-cylinder BMW K75 was developed alongside the K100, but was introduced a year after the K100 as a marketing strategy. The K75 engine had the same bore and stroke as the K100, yielding a displacement of 740 cc. Its crankshaft had 120° between the throws and was counterbalanced by balance weights added to the water pump accessory shaft, which ran at engine speed as is correct for a 120° straight-three engine. The balance shaft made the K75's engine smoother than the K100's engine. To increase the smaller engine's power, the K75's engine was given longer valve timing, the compression ratio was increased to 11.0:1 from the K100's 10.2:1, the combustion chambers were redesigned, the intake manifold was shortened, and the exhaust system was retuned. The US market engine, specified to meet Environmental Protection Agency (EPA) requirements, produced 68 hp (51 kW); engines for all other markets produced 75 hp (56 kW).

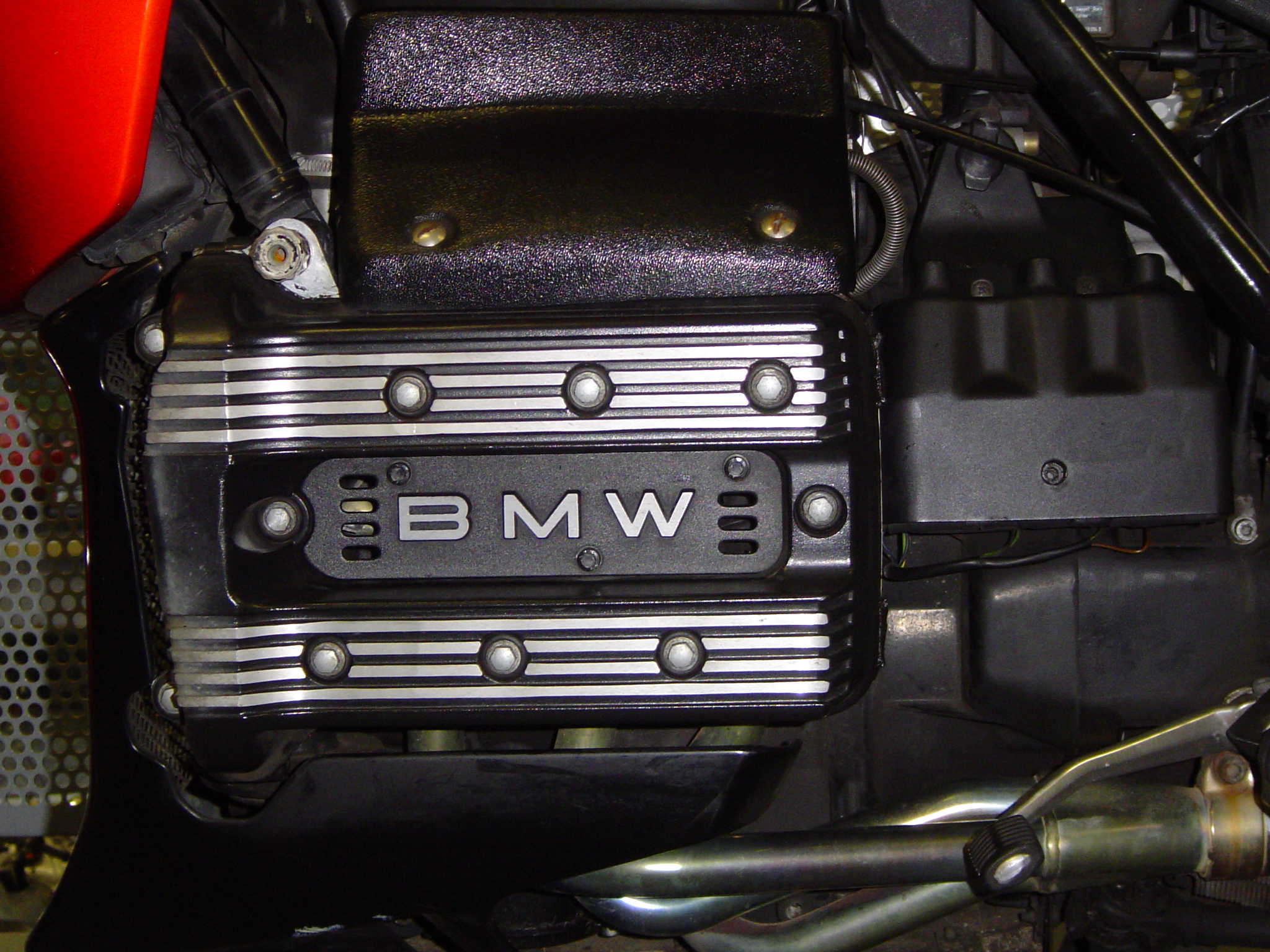
K75 valve cover

The front engine mounts on the K75 frame are placed further back than in the K100 frame and the downtubes are at a different angle; otherwise, the frames are identical. The K75 had the same wheelbase, seat height, and steering geometry as the K100. According to BMW, 80 percent of the K75's parts are interchangeable with the K100's. The K75's radiator and fuel tank were smaller than those on the K100.

== Specifications ==
A single-sided hollow swingarm enclosing the drive shaft provides the right-side drive through the gearbox and to the rear wheel. The 4-into-1 all stainless steel exhaust exits on the left-hand side.

Brakes are two-piston Brembo calipers onto undrilled discs. Two different fork manufactures are used: Showa with an outer upper tube diameter of 1.612 in (40.9 mm) and Fichtel and Sachs measuring 1.627 in (41.3 mm).

=== K100 models ===
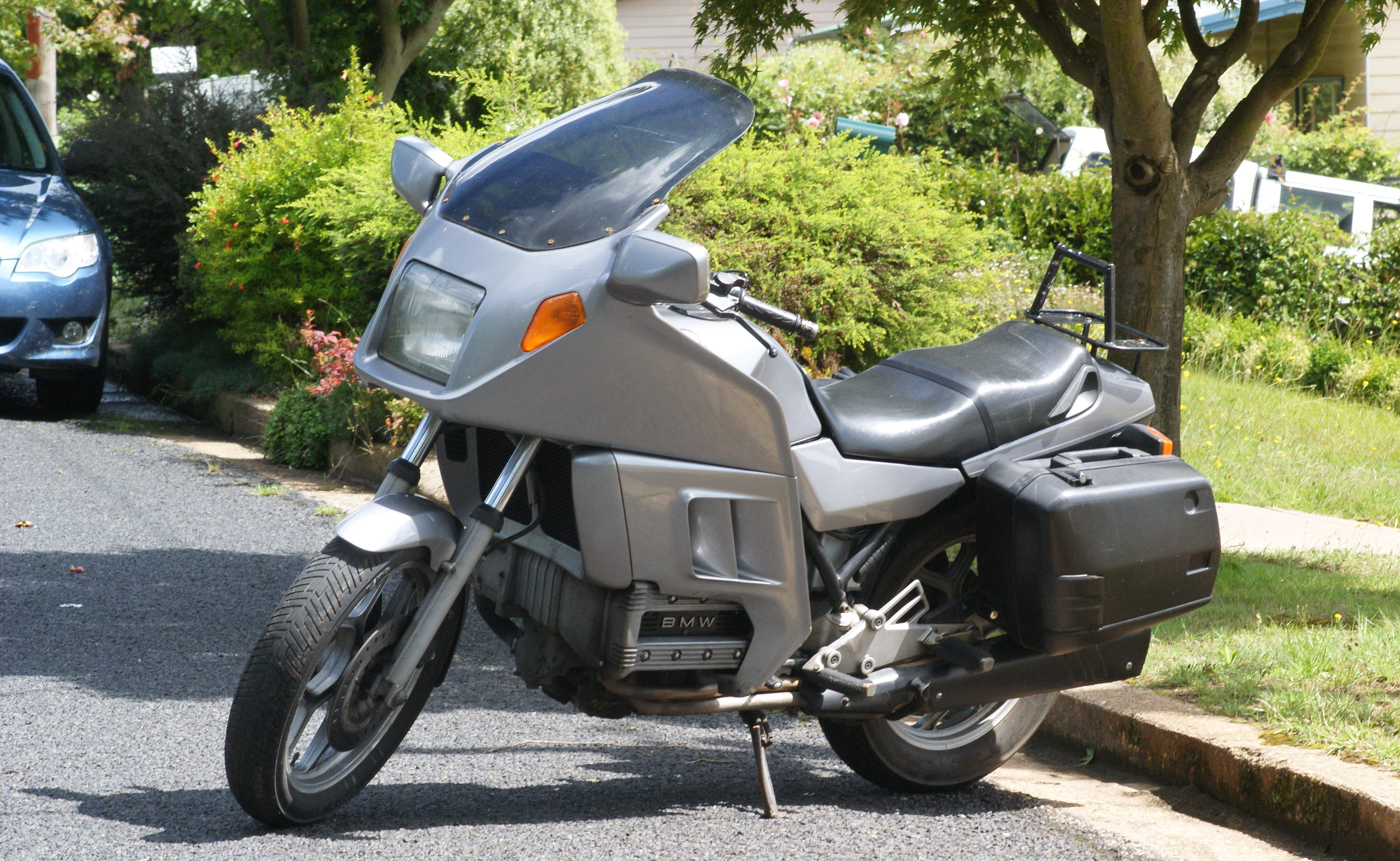
K100RT

- K100, with no fairing
- K100RS, with sports fixed fairing and lower handlebars
- K100RT, with full touring fairing
- K100LT, with higher screen and additional standard equipment for 'Luxury Touring'
- K100TIC, developed as an Authorities vehicle to support a variety of emergency services configurations including Police, Ambulance, Fire, and Military, this model designation only existed until the end of the 1985 model year. It was equipped with a high output alternator, taller first gearing, and supplementary wiring harnesses to support a variety of equipment options

All K100 models have dual front and single rear disk brakes. The RS model has taller gearing than other models.

The K-series has additional refinements including aluminium fuel tanks, adjustable headlights, high capacity 460 watt alternators, Hella accessory plug-in, and self-cancelling turn signal lights.

=== K75 models ===
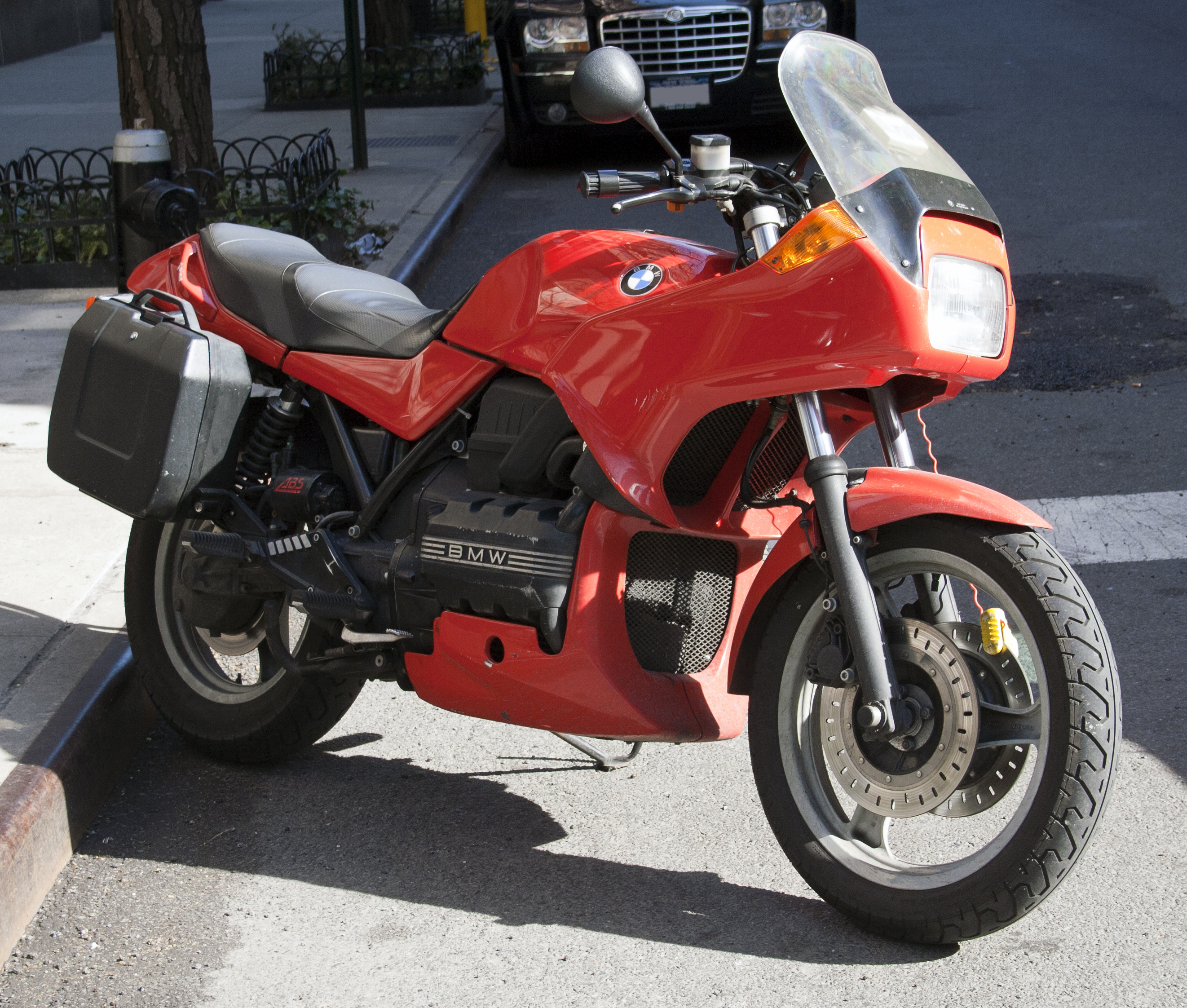
K75S with belly pan and touring bags

- K75, a naked bike with no fairing
- K75T, a US-only touring model with a windscreen, touring bags, engine crash bars, and a rear top case
- K75C, with a small cockpit fairing mounted to the handlebar
- K75S, with sport fairing, stiffer suspension, and lower and narrower handlebars
- K75RT, with full touring fairing

The S and RT versions have a rear disc brake and 17" rear wheels, whereas the others have a single leading shoe drum brake and 18" rear wheels. A stiffer "anti-dive" front suspension was added to the S and RT models. The later RT versions had an adjustable windshield that could be raised and lowered. Some taller riders complained of wind buffeting with the smaller S model stock windscreens.

== Later developments ==
The same team later developed an improved four-valve-per-cylinder head for the aerodynamic K1. In later models, the standard swingarm was replaced with a Paralever as on the K1. The LE Jetronic fuel injection system with separate ignition management was replaced by Motronic engine management with the introduction of four-valve cylinder heads with the 1990 K1 and the 1991 K100RS.

Anti-lock brakes (ABS) were developed for K100 and K75 motorcycles and were installed on later models, which were among the first production motorcycles with this feature.

In 1993, the fork used on the K75S was replaced by a 41 mm (1.6 in) Showa fork. In 1994, the electrical system was given a larger 700 watt alternator and a smaller 19 Ah battery. For 1995 anti-lock braking was standard on the K75S. Two different forks manufacturers were used: Showa with an outer upper tube diameter of 1.612 in (41 mm) and Fichtel and Sachs measuring 1.627 in (41 mm).

== Sales ==
Although sales were initially modest, buyers eventually warmed to the multi-cylinder BMWs. The K100 was a relative sales success, stemming the losses to the Japanese and changing the media and public perception of BMW.

The four-cylinder engine suffered from secondary vibration, but the three-cylinder K75, with its balance shaft, was far smoother. The engineers had anticipated this and had designed in excellent vibration isolation, but it was the only technical glitch.

The competition was never far behind in performance on the launch, updates were modest, while engine performance was stepped up with the September 1988 launch of the radically aerodynamic BMW K1.
