= BMW K1 =

Motorcycle

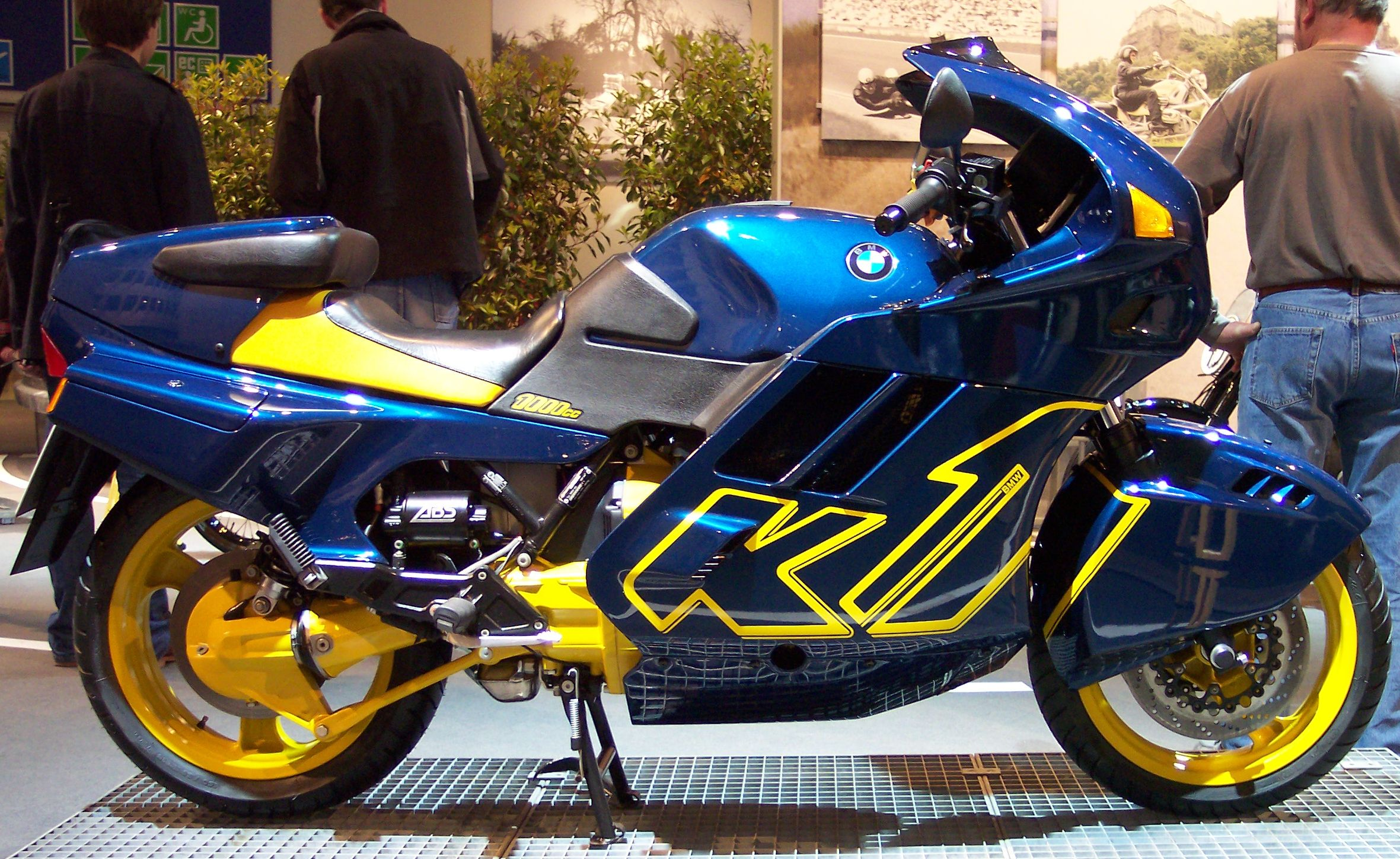
- Manufacturer: BMW
- Production: 1988–1993 (6,921 units)
- Predecessor: K100
- Class: Sport touring
- Engine: Type: 987 cc liquid-cooled longitudinal four-cylinder Valve Train: DOHC; four valves per cylinder Carburetion: Bosch electronic fuel injection Ignition: Hy Computer-controlled digital with three-dimensional mapping
- Bore / stroke: 67 mm × 70 mm (2.6 in × 2.8 in)
- Compression ratio: 11.0:1
- Top speed: 143 mph (230 km/h)
- Power: Standard 100 hp (75 kW) @ 8,000 rpm USA 95 hp (71 kW) @ 8,000 rpm
- Torque: 74 lb⋅ft (100 N⋅m) @ 6,750 rpm
- Transmission: Close-ratio five-speed; Shaft drive
- Brakes: Front: Twin 305 mm disc with four-piston Brembo callipers Rear: Single 285 mm disc Optional ABS
- Wheelbase: 1,565 mm (61.6 in)
- Dimensions: L: 2,160 mm (85 in); W: 720 mm (28 in); H: 1,170 mm (46 in)
- Seat height: 780 mm (31 in)
- Weight: 234 kg (516 lb) (dry)
- Fuel capacity: 22 L (4.8 imp gal; 5.8 US gal) (including the 4 L (0.88 imp gal; 1.1 US gal) reserve)
- Fuel consumption: 44 mpg_{‑imp} (6.4 L/100 km; 37 mpg_{‑US}) to 55 mpg_{‑imp} (5.1 L/100 km; 46 mpg_{‑US})

The BMW K1 is a motorcycle manufactured by BMW, introduced in 1988.

Although expensive and either loved or hated, the short production run created the result that the motorcycling press and public never had the same view of BMW motorcycles again.

Some of its early technology had some issues: The enclosure created excess heat buildup, while the long wheelbase created a 22 ft (6.7 m) turning circle.

== Background: solution to a marketing problem ==
Through the need to meet proposed European Union legislation on emissions regulation, BMW had started to develop an alternative technology to its traditional flat-twin engines with the introduction of the 1,000 cc BMW K100 from 1983 to 1992. Led by Josef Fritzenwenger and Stefan Pachernegg, the team developed a design prototype based on a liquid-cooled Peugeot car engine. In the base design of the K100, the engine was laid on its side in line with the motorcycle frame, known as a longitudinal four, with the crankshaft on the right hand side of the motorcycle, with the cylinders, pistons, camshafts, injectors and spark plugs on the left hand side. This arrangement keeps the centre of gravity relatively low, which benefits handling.

== Design ==
The K100 is still a cruiser/tourer design in bias, and BMW marketing wanted a sports oriented tourer to appeal to a more youth oriented market perception, and compete with the Japanese factories. BMW was committed to the manufacturer imposed 100 bhp (75 kW) limit for motorcycles sold in Germany, so decided that to address both issues it needed to turn to aerodynamics to solve the problem.

In 1984 at the Cologne Motor Show, BMW design created the aerodynamic "Racer" mockup, based on a standard K100 chassis. At the 1988 Cologne show, the production K1 used the same large and all enveloping two-piece front mud guard mated closely to a seven-piece main fairing, that included two small panniers (lids made by Zanussi ZCP (Zanussi Componenti Plastica)). The resultant drag coefficient was 0.34 with the rider prone, the lowest of any production motorcycle in 1988.

Adding to the "different to traditional BMW" nature of the bike, the colour scheme of bright red or blue with yellow graphics and highlighting was bold, and hence seen as so different to normal BMW, bizarre.

== Marketing, sales and usage ==
By the time the K1 was launched, it was quick but not fast. The result of the addition of the aerodynamic bodywork and general upgrading of engineering and components added to the weight, which as a result came in as heavy for a sports bike at 234 kg (516 lb). Combined with the extended wheelbase which created a 22-foot (6.7 m) turning circle, it made the bike an economical and comfortable sports tourer. But the engine was not powerful enough against the weight to make the bike quick accelerating, and hence sports-competitive.

The all over fairing was found in early press road tests to retain excess heat below 50 mph (80 km/h), and in some cases burn riders. BMW eventually offered an under-fairing heat blanket which reduced this considerably, but it was always a problem. However, as BMW knew weight was a problem, the panels were well engineered but thin and subject to cracking. Resultantly panel fit was poor on early models, and combined with panel cracking earned the bike the nickname "yoghurt carton" in Germany. The design and manufacture of the panels never changed in the bikes production, but the colouring schemes were toned down from a ketchup red and metallic blue with yellow details, to a metallic black.

The engine, although well developed, suffered from secondary vibration. This was minimal in the three-cylinder K100 derived K75, and minimised in the K100 through introduction of well designed vibration suppression. On the sporting inspired K1, the engine was directly mounted onto the frame, which led to secondary vibrations problems at certain mid-range engine revolutions.

By 1993, the market had changed and developed considerably, with the introduction of sports bikes like the Tadao Baba designed Honda Fireblade, brought about the end of production.
