= Honda SS50 =

Honda SS50Z
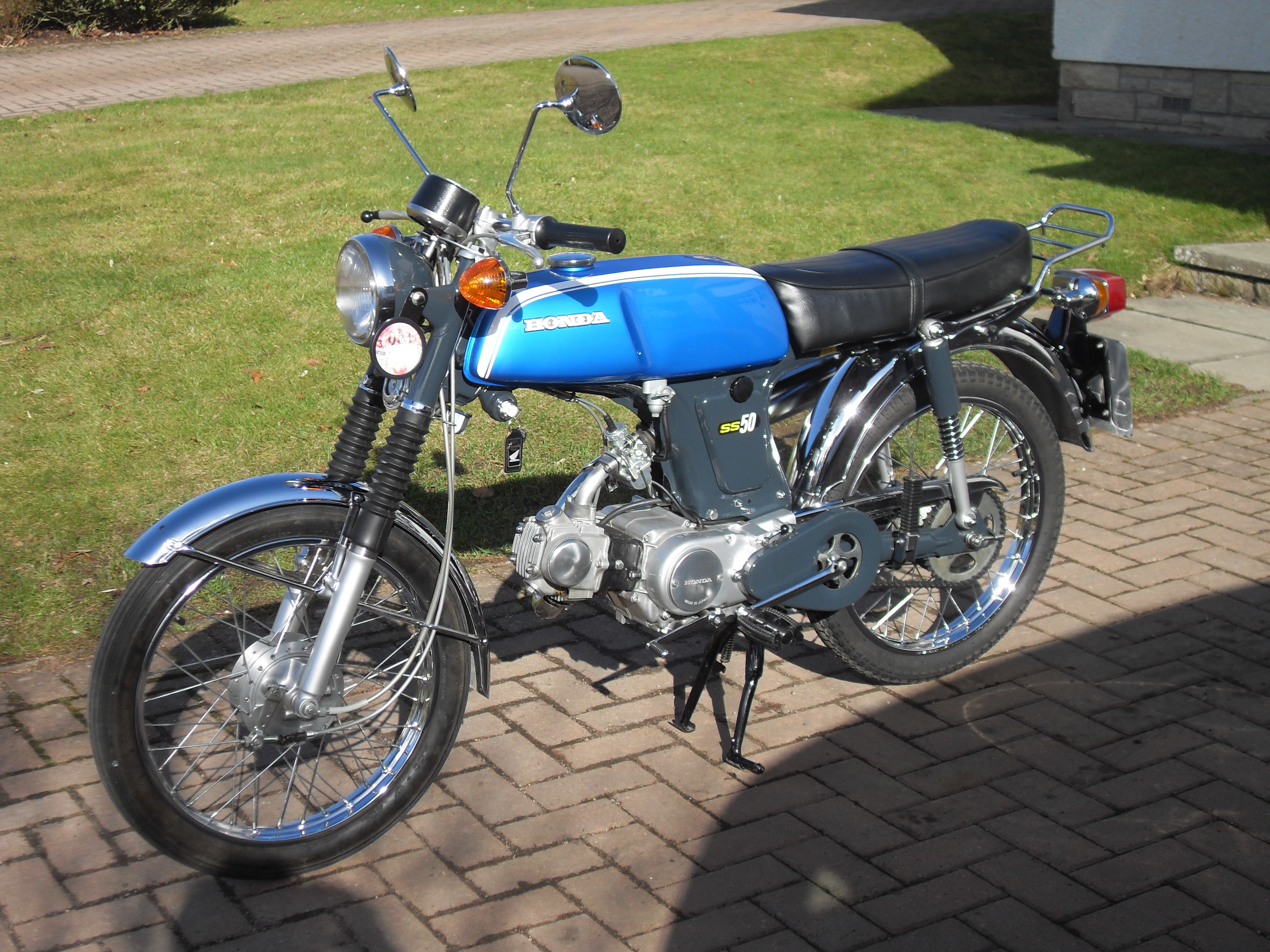
- Fully restored 1975 Honda SS50ZK1-e (UK 4-speed)
- Manufacturer: Honda Motor Company
- Predecessor: Honda SS50
- Class: Motorcycle
- Engine: 49 cc (3.0 cu in), four stroke, air-cooled, OHC, single
- Transmission: 4-speed, later 5-speed, manual via chain
- Frame type: Pressed-steel
- Suspension: Hydraulic, front and rear
- Brakes: Drum, later front disc/rear drum
- Wheelbase: 1.180 m (46.5 in)
- Dimensions: L: 1.840 m (72.4 in); H: 1.020 m (40.2 in)
- Seat height: 0.750 m (29.5 in)
- Weight: 76 kg (168 lb) (dry)
- Fuel capacity: 7 L (1.5 imp gal; 1.8 US gal)
- Oil capacity: 0.7 L (0.15 imp gal; 0.18 US gal)

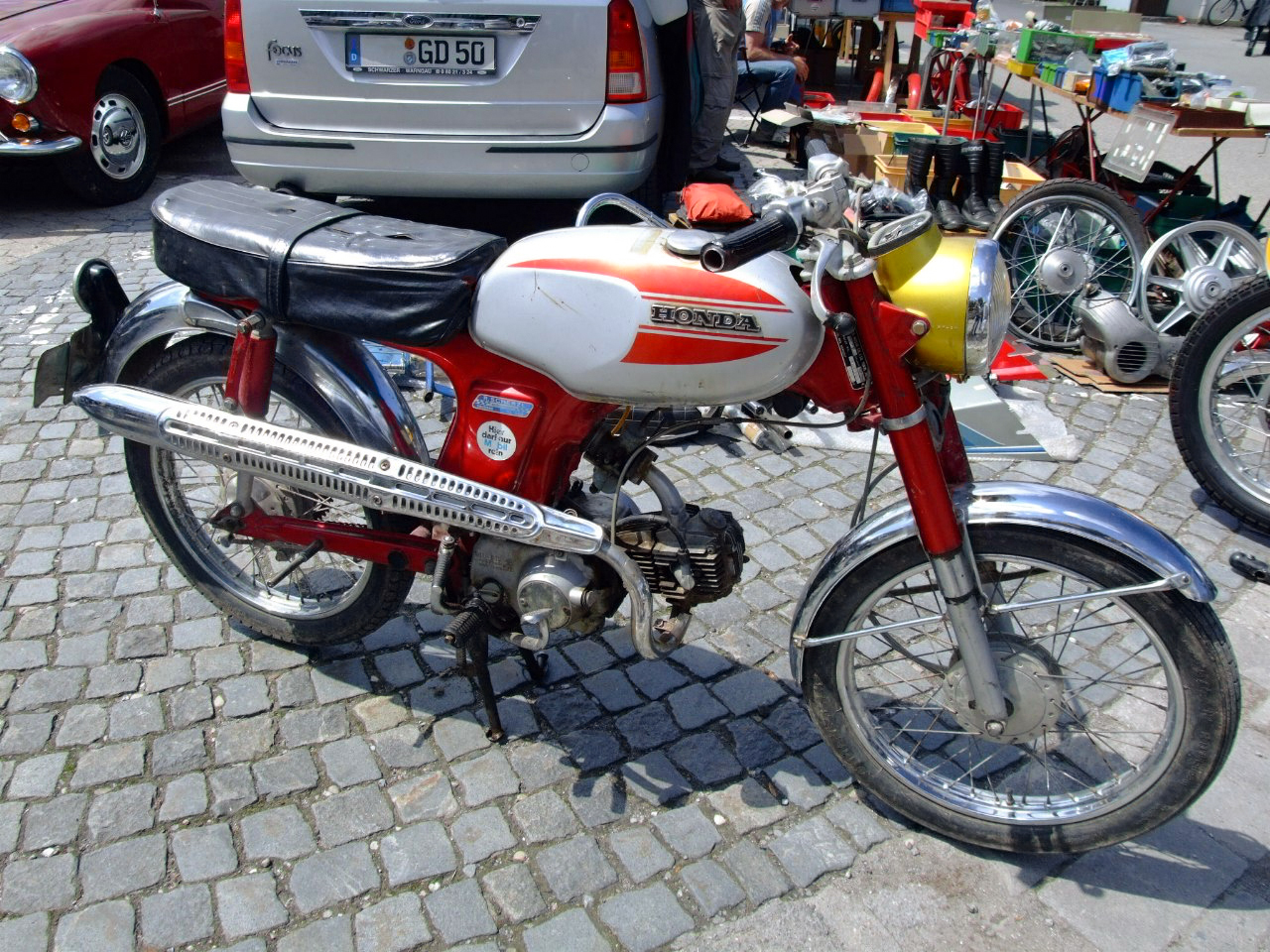
Early German version of the Honda SS50

The Honda SS50 is a 50 cc (3.1 cu in) motorcycle manufactured by the Honda Motor Company.

Predecessors were the OHV C110/C11/C114 and OHC S50. Produced from 1961 onwards, the Honda 50 Sport (type C110 and C111) variant of the Super Cub, laid out the basics of all future models: It had a pressed-steel frame, hydraulic front and rear forks, a 49 cc (3.0 cu in) OHV four-stroke engine. The cylinder was laid horizontally to optimise cooling. The final drive was chain running in an enclosed chain case. The S50 featured an all-new OHC alloy head engine.

The SS50 replaced these in the late 1960s, using a new T-shaped frame with separate rear mudguard, and telescopic front forks to replace the leading links.

== SS50 ==
The SS50 replaced the OHV C110 and derivatives, with the SS standing for "Super Sports". Basically with the same form as the S50, it had a few upgrades:

The first SS50s in the late 1960s, were delivered with chrome panelled tank, and frame painted in the same colour as the tank's paintwork. Later on they got a longer, thinner 7 L (1.5 imp gal; 1.8 US gal) petrol tank in red, blue or yellow and a grey frame, and chromed mudguards. Introduced with a four-speed gearbox, the handlebar controls and switches corresponded to the high level of other Honda motorcycle models, made from cast aluminum, and a standard rear-view mirror. All three of these bikes came complete with a chromed high level exhaust and heat shield.

The later five-speed SS50 had an extra gear and the engine was also tuned up making it faster and more competitive in the UK market. The frames of the later five-speed models were black differing to the grey of the four-speed. The last five-speed versions had a front disc brake instead of the twin drums used earlier..

As a moped, to comply with the legal requirements in the United Kingdom and some other European countries, the SS50 was available with a pair of bicycle-like pedals. The special pedal cranks allowed both pedals to be rotated forward, so that the pedals would form motorcycle-style footrests in normal operation.

All Mopeds registered in the UK after 1 September 1977 were restricted to a maximum of 31 miles per hour (50 km/h), but did not legally need bicycle pedals.

== Competition ==
The Honda SS50 varied greatly from its competitors in using a four-stroke engine, its global competitors the Suzuki AP50 - A50II and the Yamaha FS1E "Fizzy" used two-stroke engines. This made the SS50 slower on acceleration, but more reliable and economical.

== Related models ==
The SS50 49 cc engine was also used in numerous related models including the ST series (minibike) and the Z series "monkey".

== In Vietnam ==
The Honda SS50 is commonly known as a Honda 67, later Honda 72 (SS50V 1972 model) in Vietnam, particularly in the South.

== See also ==
- Honda CD70
- Honda CL70
- Honda Sport 90
