= Yamaha FS1 =

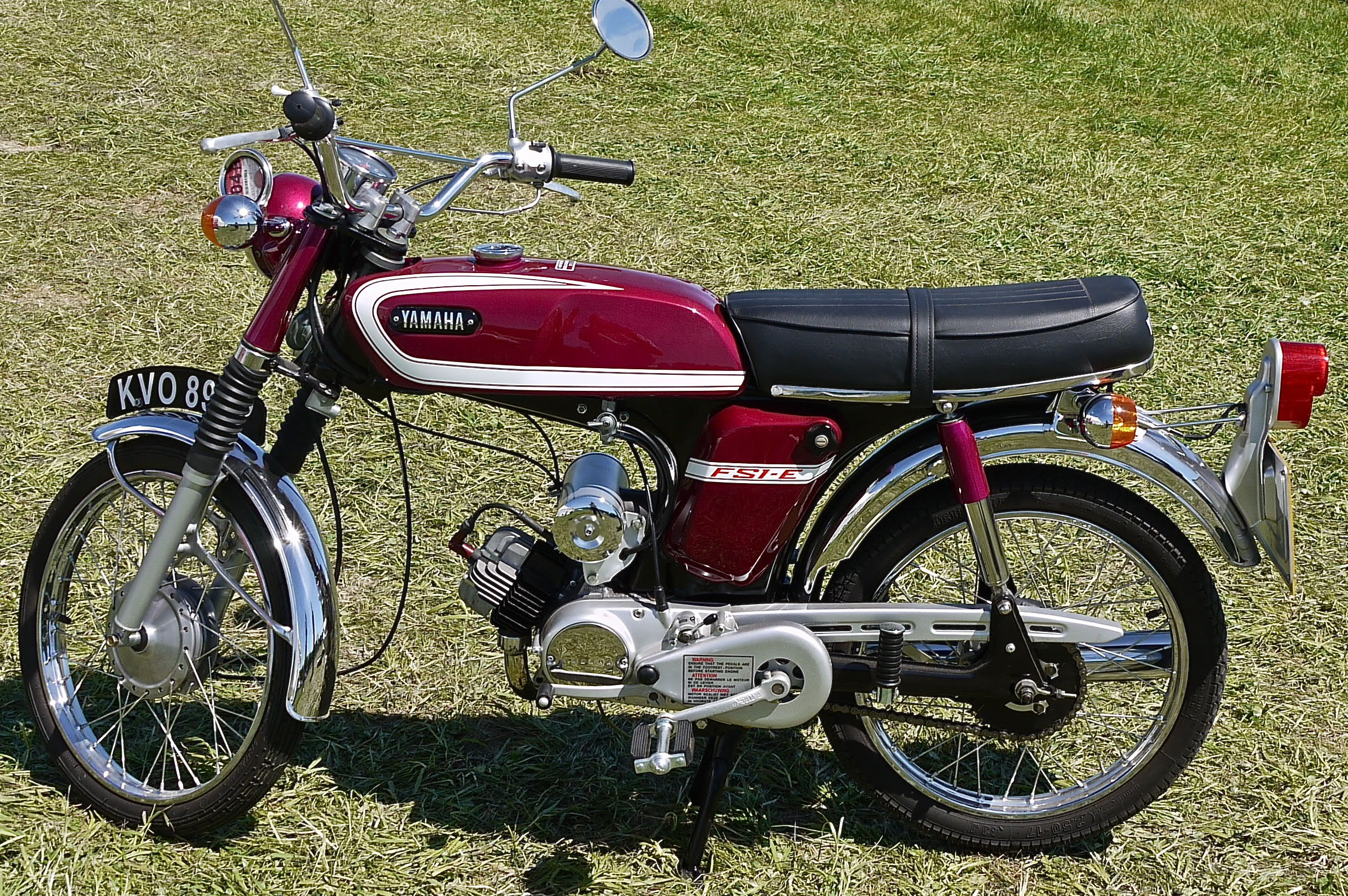
- Manufacturer: Yamaha
- Class: Moped
- Engine: 49 cc (3.0 cu in) two stroke single
- Transmission: 4/5 speed manual with chain final drive
- Brakes: Drum, front and rear; 110mm single leading shoe
- Wheelbase: 1.160 m (3 ft 9.7 in)
- Dimensions: L: 1.775 m (5 ft 9.9 in); W: .555 m (1 ft 9.9 in); H: .935 m (3 ft 0.8 in)
- Seat height: .740 m (2 ft 5.1 in)
- Fuel capacity: 6.5 L (1.4 imp gal; 1.7 US gal)
- Ground clearance: .135 m (5.3 in)

The FS1 is a Yamaha moped of the 1970s. Various letter suffixes were added to indicate model variation to suit local regulations, such as the FS1-E for England, FS1P/DX NL and others.

== FS1-E UK model ==
The FS1-E was the UK model. Machines registered in the UK from 1 August 1977 were restricted to a maximum of 31 mph (50 km/h).

=== Design ===
Originally the FS1-E was built as a five-speed transmission light motorcycle. It was originally called the FS1. Due to the regulations in Europe, the FS1-E was downtuned with a four-speed transmission.

The Yamaha FS1-E has a 49 cc (3.0 cu in), single cylinder, two-stroke, air-cooled, rotary disc-valved engine with a four-speed gearbox. The FS1-E was the FS1 with the suffix E, which stood for England (differing from the models sold in other countries as the FS1-E had more cycle parts in common with other UK-imported Yamaha models). Yamaha introduced various improvements such as a front disc brake (FS1-E DX model) over the years, and later an autolube model with a two-stroke oil tank and oil pump, with no need to manually mix two-stroke oil into the fuel tank.

About 200,000 were produced for the UK market. An award-winning short film was produced in 2006 and is available entitled 'Fizzy Days' encompassing the bikes and the era.

=== Pedals ===
The FS1-E had the ability to be powered by pushbike type pedals since this was a legal requirement for registration as a moped in the United Kingdom and some other European countries at the time.

The special pedal cranks allowed both pedals to be rotated forward so that the pedals would form motorcycle-style footrests in normal operation. To engage the pedals, the left-hand pedal crank could be rotated 180 degrees backwards and locked, and a drive gear engaged allowing the user to pedal. A short chain connected the pedal drive to the main engine-chain drive system. Pedalling was hard work for the rider: there was no freewheel and the pedal gearing was very low. The engine could be started with pedal drive engaged, causing the pedals to rotate under engine power when the bike was in gear. In practice, the cam and shaft arrangement to engage the pedals frequently seized (in normal operation, a rider would very rarely engage pedal-drive as it was less tiring to push than to pedal).

The pedals were designed by Henk Dullens, a former employee of "Het Motorpaleis" in The Netherlands. The system was originally designed for the Yamaha F5, which was a predecessor of the FS1-E.

=== Specification ===
Engine: Two-stroke single cylinder rotary disc valve induction, four gears, running on a 20:1 mix of petrol and two-stroke oil.

Frame: pressed steel tubular backbone type.

Electrics : Magneto ignition with integral 6 V AC for the main running lights (including high and low beam on a switch). The indicators, brake lights, neutral light and horn ran separately on 6 V DC from a three-cell lead acid battery that received a trickle charge from the magneto. On most models the three position ignition switch (with a key, providing off, run and lights) was originally mounted on the left side panel, until it was moved to the more modern position between the handlebars on the FS1-E DX (front disc brake equipped model) and later FS1-E models.

The right side panel contains a basic toolkit in a plastic case: pliers, 3 spanners, double ended screwdriver, plug spanner.

== The competition ==
The second most popular moped of this era came from Honda, the SS50. They had a similar speed, and thanks to their 4-stroke design were cleaner, more economical and potentially longer lived though without quite the same acceleration. All suffered the same legislative fate in August 1977, when speed restrictions were introduced. For a short time after this date some smaller manufacturers (particularly Italian) brought in machines that could easily be derestricted without the use of any additional parts or any machining.
