= Honda CBR400 =

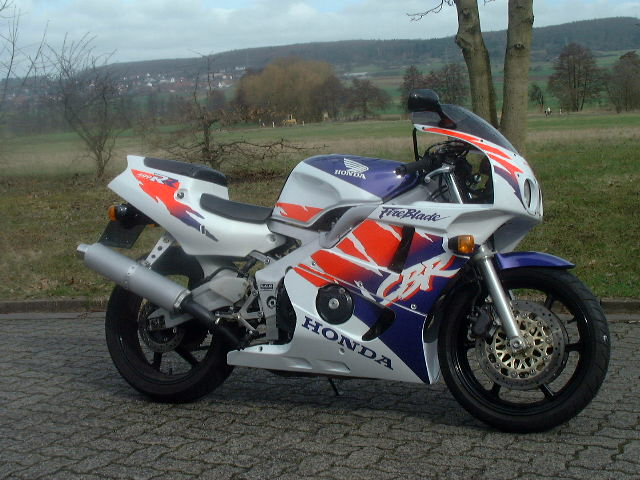
- Manufacturer: Honda
- Also called: CBR400F, CBR400R, CBR400RR
- Production: 1983–2000; 2013–present (CBR400R)
- Assembly: Japan
- Successor: CBR500R
- Class: Sport bike
- Engine: 399 cc (24.3 cu in), liquid cooled, DOHC, four-stroke, 16v, inline-4 VTEC; 2013–present liquid-cooled, 4-stroke 8v, DOHC, parallel-twin
- Bore / stroke: 55.0 mm × 42.0 mm (2.17 in × 1.65 in); 67.0 mm × 56.6 mm (2.64 in × 2.23 in)(2013–present)
- Top speed: 179 km/h (111 mph)
- Power: inline-4 44 kW (59 hp) @ 13000 rpm parallel-twin 34 kW (46 hp) @ 9500 rpm
- Torque: inline-4 39 N⋅m (29 lbf⋅ft) @ 10000 r/min (rpm) parallel-twin 38 N⋅m (28 lbf⋅ft) @ 7500 rpm
- Ignition type: Electric starter
- Transmission: 6-speed, manual, chain final drive
- Brakes: F: Double disc R: Disc
- Wheelbase: 1,410 mm (55.5 in)
- Dimensions: W: 650 mm (25.5 in)
- Seat height: 780 mm (30.8 in)
- Weight: 162 kg (357 lb) (dry); 179 kg (395 lb) (wet)
- Fuel capacity: 15 L; 3.3 imp gal (4.0 US gal)

The Honda CBR400 is a Japanese domestic market small-capacity sport motorcycle, part of the CBR series introduced by Honda in 1983. It was the first Honda motorcycle to wear a CBR badge.

== History ==
The CBR400R (NC17) naked bike was launched in December 1983. The 4-valves per cylinder, liquid cooled, four-stroke, DOHC, inline-four engine has a rotational-speed valve stop mechanism "REV" (a prototype of Honda's VTEC system) that changed from two valves into four valves at 9,500 rpm. The following two years, it came as semi- and fully faired version as the F3 Endurance. The CBR400R and early CBR400RR models both carry the model number NC23, which makes up the first part of these bikes' frame numbers. In 1986 the CBR400R was also known as Aero, Jellymould, as it shares its major design features with the rest of the early CBR600F and CBR1000F Hurricane family of motorcycles, which include significantly rounded body shapes. Whereas the later 1988 model was designated CBR400RR and was also known as the Tri-Arm, after its racing inspired braced swingarm.

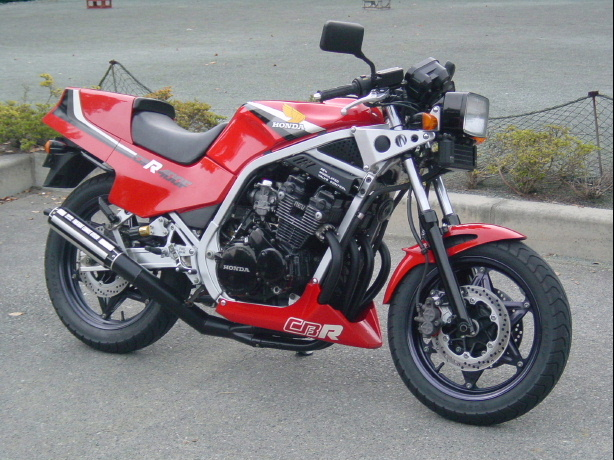
The original CBR400F as a naked bike

The CBR400RR in 1992 was referred to as the 'Baby Blade' replica, then in 1994 it was styled to closely look like the CBR900RR or Fireblade motorcycle. Though over the years, in performance and handling, it was more closely compared to the CBR600. The CBR400RR preceded the 900 cc (55 cu in) Fireblade by four model years, going through one major rework (signified by a new "gull-arm" swingarm design).

The CBR400RR models are the NC23 and NC29 CBR400RR-J (1988), CBR400RR-K (1989), CBR400RR-L (1990–1991), CBR400RR-N (1992–1993) and CBR400RR-R (1994). The name "Tri-Arm" is shown on the CBR400RR-J's bodywork, along with Hurricane, but the CBR400RR-K dropped the latter designation.

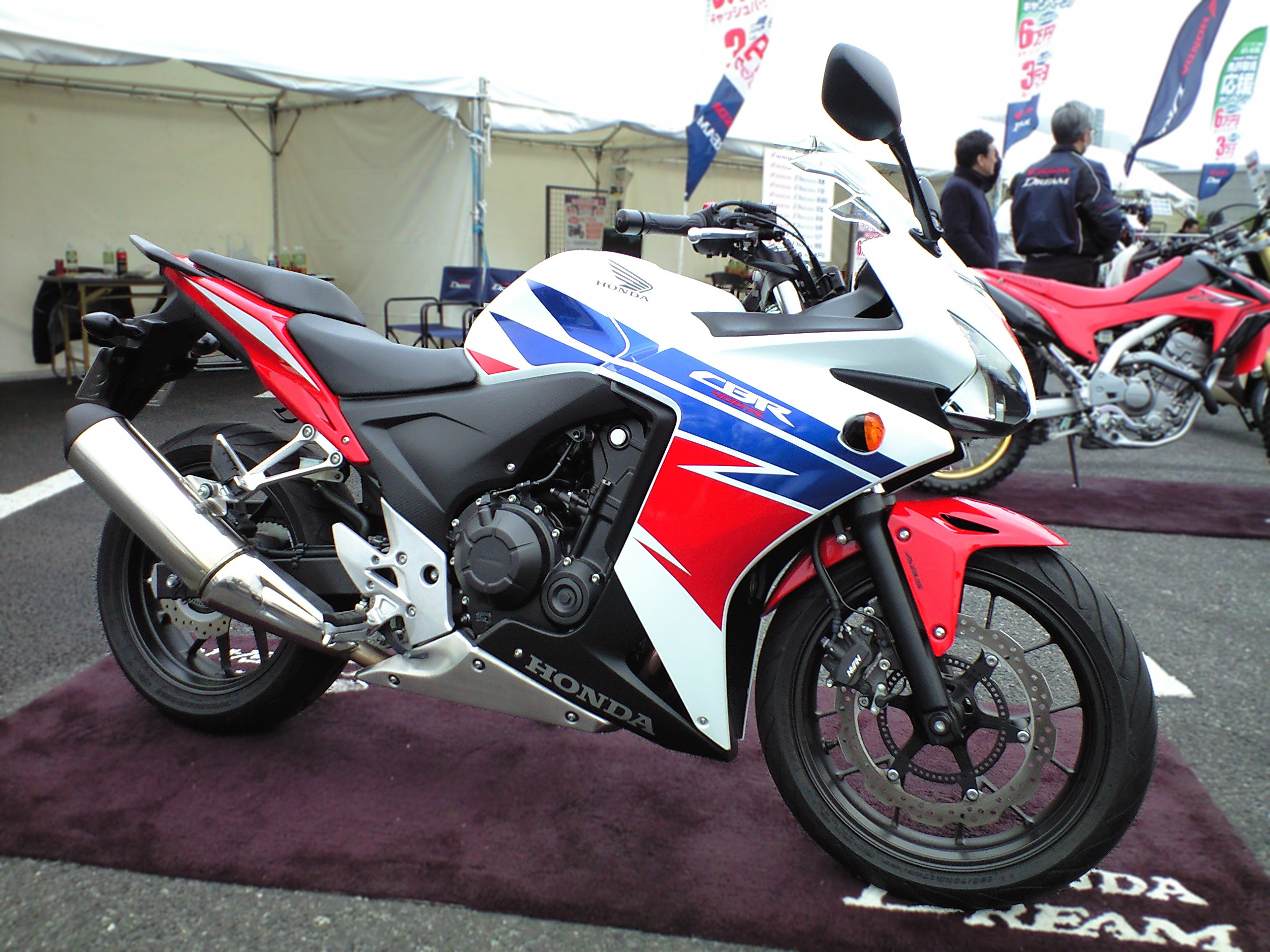
2014 Honda CBR400R

The NC23 CBR400RR features a standard extruded beam frame, the rear of the seat unit slopes forwards, and the seat unit subframe is totally separate from the main chassis of the bike. The NC23 & NC29 (only the -R models of which carry the FireBlade name) have several modifications to the frame. The main rails are of a 'cranked' design, the seat support structure has a larger rail that was welded to the frame, the rear of the tail section now had a slight recurve to it, and the swingarm was given a gull-wing shape on one side to give ground clearance for the exhaust link pipe.

In 1985, Honda brought a CBR400F to the US for testing, on which Cycle World recorded a 0 to 1/4 mi (0.00 to 0.40 km) time of 13.63 seconds at 95.94 mph (154.40 km/h) and a top speed of 200 km/h

In 2013, Honda released the new twin-cylinder CBR400R along with its naked model, the CB400F (not to be confused with four-cylinder CB400 Super Four), and sport adventure model, the CB400X, which is based on the CBR500R, CB500F, and CB500X respectively. These models are sold in Japan & Singapore only.

== New generation features ==
It has an immobiliser key and Combined ABS but no Cornering ABS, cornering lights, adaptive brake light, engine braking control, traction control system, quickshifter, or Bluetooth.

As a feature, it does not have keyless ignition.

== See also ==
- Kawasaki ZXR400
- Honda RVF400
- Yamaha FZR400
- Suzuki GSX-R400
