= Yamaha FZ600 =

- Manufacturer: Yamaha
- Production: 1986–1988
- Successor: FZR600
- Class: Sport bike

The Yamaha FZ600 was Yamaha's first true attempt at a 600 cc "Race Replica" with the growing interest in MotoGP Road Racing taking hold in the mid-1980s. Many FZ owners confuse their bikes with the later FZR models due to similar name and body styling.

A major difference between the FZ600 and its successor, the FZR600, is the Delta Box One-Frame the FZR600 incorporated, like the one used on the earlier FZR400. This gave the FZRs more rigid support, tighter handling and reduced weight. Another notable difference was that the FZR600's engine was tilted forward to a significantly greater angle, thus providing a lower center of gravity and even more handling capability. The almost horizontal angle also allowed the carburetors to be mounted vertically above the intake manifolds, letting gravity help the venturi, and opening up the door for extensive performance mods like velocity stacks. The FZR600 owed much to its predecessor, such as the sleek body stylings, responsive suspension, and race oriented-spirit.

== History ==
The Yamaha FZ600 was produced from 1986 to 1988 being replaced by the FZR-600 (1989–1996), which was then replaced by the YZF600 Thundercat (1996–2002). The FZ engine was closely derived from the XJ-600 motor, which can itself trace its lineage back through the XJ-550 to the XJ-400, a Japanese home market model. This motor was also used in the YX600 Radian. It also shared brakes with a huge number of other Yamaha Models before, during, and even after its production. The same front brake master cylinder was used on the FZR-600 up until the end of its production (1999). In 1986 Yamaha produced the FZ "pure sports" version, with more performance oriented modifications. The FZ600's main competitors when it was released were the Kawasaki GPZ600 and Honda CBR600F. Suzuki's GSX-600 Katana was given little consideration, with the GSXR-750 getting all the attention at the time.

== Engine ==
The FZ came as a 4-stroke, four-cylinder, four-carburetor, naturally aspirated, air-cooled engine package mated with a six-gear constant mesh transmission, dropped into a rectangular tube frame that seemed pieced together from a modern standpoint, balanced upon a large rear mono shock hidden between the swingarm and subframe under the battery complementary to two smooth front forks. It has two large circular headlights iconic of Yamaha FZR's large and small displacement. The fuel tank has a triangular side profile that matches the frame well, with a flat top and a fuel petcock at the bottom left with an overflow hose fitting at the bottom of the front. The four Mikuni BS-30 carburetors utilize the "Round-Slide" design with the diaphragm assembly actuating the main needle jets, with plastic floats and brass slides. It uses two ignition coils (two cylinders each) controlled by a TCI printed circuit board unit, and timed by a two brush "Pick-Up Coil" mounted to the crank. The engine oil doubles as the transmission's lubricant, wetting the manual clutch. The FZ-600 was air-cooled (a Japanese-only 400cc version, the FZ400, was water cooled) with a radiator-like oil cooler mounted on the front of the frame between the engine and front wheel. It also had a thundering four-into-one exhaust. A four-fuse block provides for the headlights, turn signals, rectifier/regulator, etc.

== New models ==
Since 1988, the FZ-600 was replaced by several later generations of Yamaha bikes. The "FZ" name has re-emerged in recent years with Yamaha's new line of sport-touring bikes that are offered as the alternative to the aggressive YZF-R1 and YZF-R6. The new FZ come as either 600cc or 1000cc engine size and are optionally naked (no fairing) or come with a half-fairing. They share the engine of their race-geared R1/R6 siblings, adding riding positions and suspension setups more adapted to everyday street use and long touring rides.
