= Suzuki GSX-R400 =

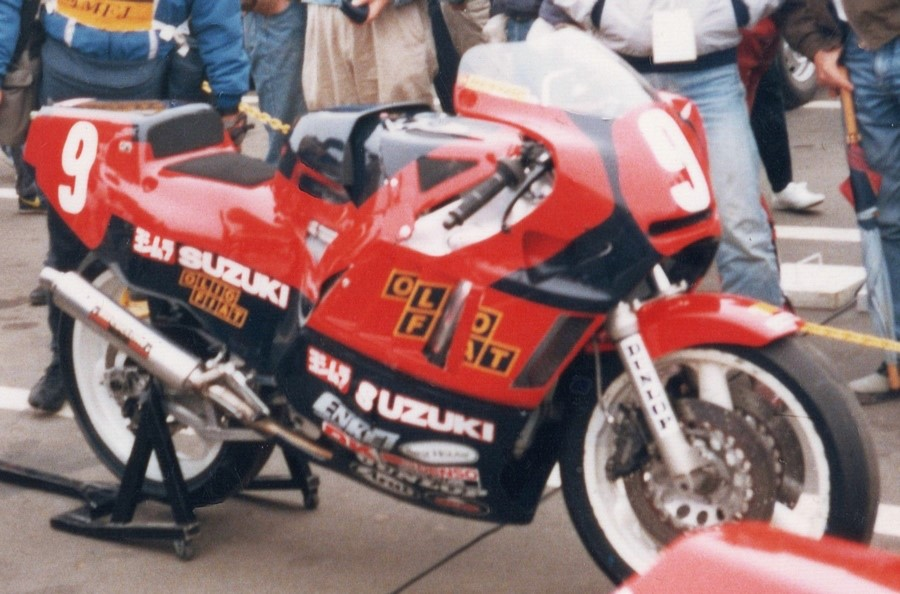
- Manufacturer: Suzuki
- Also called: GSXR400, GSX-R400R, GSXR400RR
- Production: 1984–1996
- Predecessor: Suzuki GSX400FW
- Class: Sport bike
- Engine: 398 cc (24.3 cu in), 16-valve. DOHC, four-stroke, liquid cooled transverse inline four
- Related: Suzuki GSX-R750

The Suzuki GSX-R400 was a 400 class sport bike produced by Japanese motorcycle manufacturer Suzuki between 1984 and 1996. It was the first GSX-R model ever made by Suzuki, as a race replica evolution of sport touring GSX series. Like other bikes in its class, the GSX-R400 was continuously updated and subsequently there is a slew of different models.

All GSX-R400s were powered by naturally-aspirated, carburetted, 398cc four-stroke inline-four engines with four valves per cylinder and dual overhead camshafts. Whilst all engines were liquid-cooled, some models were also air and oil-cooled. Suzuki also changed the GSXRs frame type multiple times - with different twin-spar and double-cradle arrangements sampled throughout the production run - though they were always constructed solely of aluminium.

== Models ==
The 1984 GSX-R400 was released in Japan and had 59 hp (44 kW).

In 1985 a fuel level gauge was added which showed the remaining amount of fuel indicated by the right side combination meter when the ignition was in the "Off" position.

The bike was almost entirely redesigned for 1986. The power-to-weight ratio was increased to 0.39 hp/kg with the new chassis and shorter wheelbase that Suzuki introduced. The 1986 and 1987 models use slightly different engines than before. The liquid cooling design was dropped for Suzuki's "SATCS" (Suzuki advanced three-way cooling system) that used water air and oil to keep the engine cool. A new single square headlight was also introduced which was never very popular and Suzuki returned the headlights to the two circular lights the following year.

Not many changes were made in 1987 with largest ones being the new wheels, twin headlights, gold brake calipers, the new paint scheme and the new exhaust design. A special edition was also available in 87' with a black/gold paint scheme.

In 1988 the GSX-R received a new aluminium frame which increased the weight and new fairings with a lower wheelbase once again to create a more stable and better handling bike. The model also got slingshot carburetors, polished stainless steel silencers, curved radiator, Tokico 4-cylinder front brake calipers and a rear hugger mudguard. The new 4 into 2 exhaust was designed to create more midrange torque but this had only a marginal effect on the engines power. Yoshimura also produced the cyclone system 4 into 1. In 1988 a sports production model was introduced (SP) which incorporate among other things no passenger foot pegs and the rear shocks were visible under the seat.

In 1989, the name of the model was additionally supplemented with the letter "R". The new GSX-R400R model name. In 1990, Suzuki introduced a completely new model GSX-R400 with inverted forks and new double cradle aluminum frame and with a new 4 into 1 exhaust power increased to 60 hp (45 kW). In 1993 Powers was reduced to 53 hp (40 kW) because of a power restriction in Japan. Production was ceased in May 1996.

== Specifications ==
	(1984–1985)	(1986–1987)	(1988–1989)	(1990–1992)	(1993–1996)
Engine	16-valve DOHC transverse four-stroke inline four, liquid cooled				
Displacement	398.9 cc (24.34 cu in)		398 cc (24.3 cu in)		
Bore x Stroke	53.00 mm × 45.20 mm (2.1 in × 1.8 in)		56.00 mm × 40.40 mm (2.2 in × 1.6 in)		
Compression Ratio	11.5:1		11.8:1		
Power	59 hp (44 kW) (claimed)			60 hp (45 kW) (claimed)	
Torque				28.3 lb⋅ft (38.4 N⋅m) (claimed)	
Exhaust	4 into 1		4 into 2	4 into 1	
Gearbox	constant-mesh, sequential 6-speed				
top speed				127 mph (204 km/h)	
Final drive	Chain				
Dry weight				167 kg (368 lb)	
Frame	Aluminium double cradle	Aluminium twin spar		Aluminium double cradle	

== See also ==
- Honda CBR400
- Honda RVF400
- Yamaha FZR400
- Kawasaki ZXR400
