= Yamaha FZR600 =

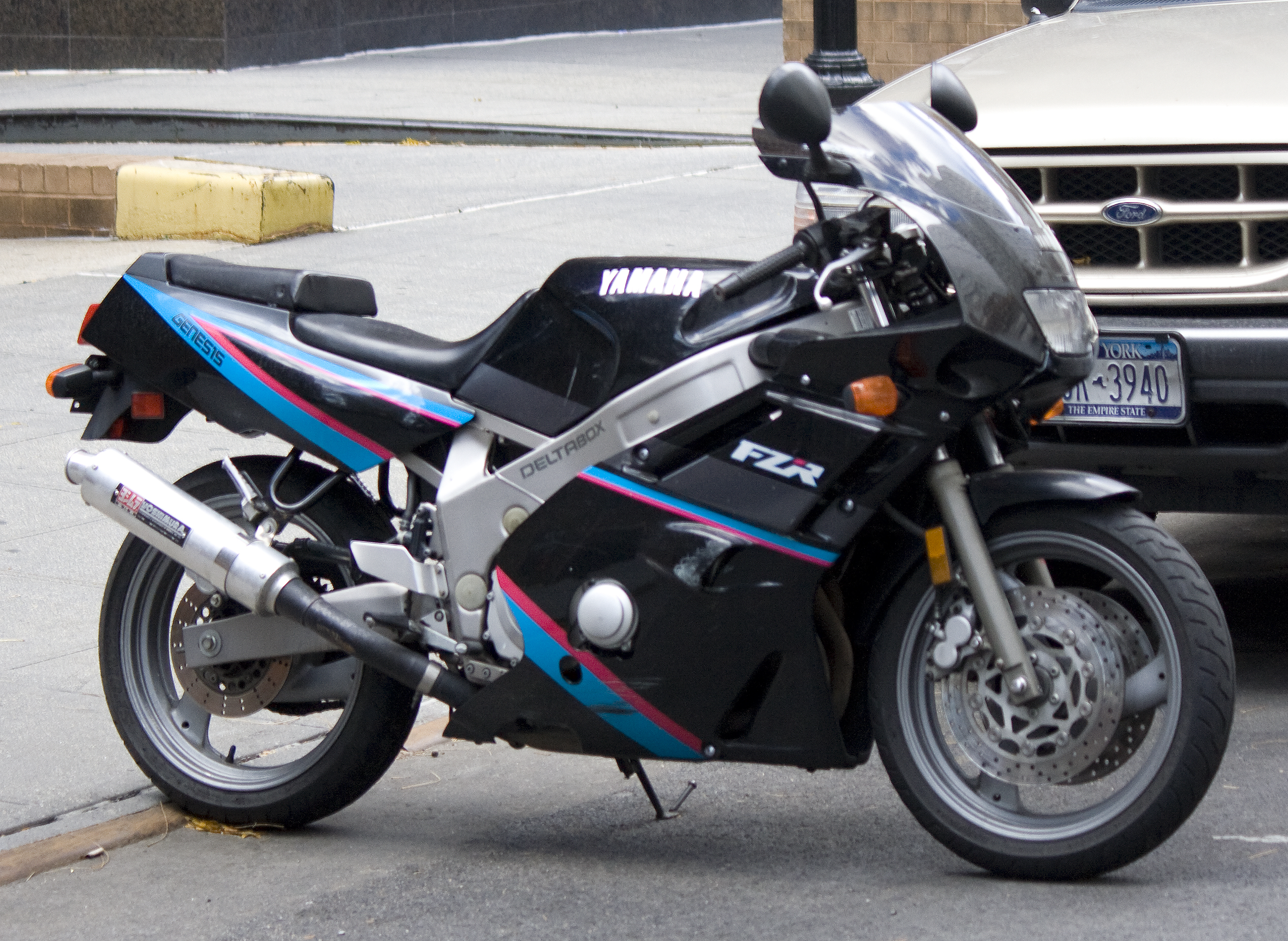
- 1991 Yamaha FZR600
- Manufacturer: Yamaha Motor Company
- Also called: 3HE, 4JH
- Production: 1988–1995
- Predecessor: Yamaha FZ600
- Successor: Yamaha YZF600R
- Class: Sport bike
- Engine: 599 cc, 4-stroke, liquid cooled, inline 4-cylinder, DOHC, 16 valves
- Bore / stroke: 59.0 mm × 54.8 mm (2.32 in × 2.16 in)
- Compression ratio: 12,0 : 1
- Power: 91 PS (66.9 kW) @ 10500 RPM
- Torque: 65.7 N⋅m (48.5 lb⋅ft) @ 8500 RPM
- Ignition type: Digital, transistor controlled
- Transmission: 6-speed, constant mesh, final drive chain
- Frame type: steel Deltabox
- Suspension: Front: telescopic fork travel 130 mm (5.1 in); Rear: swingarm monoshock (link suspension) travel 115 mm (4.5 in)
- Brakes: Front: double disc 298 mm (11.7 in); Rear: single disc 245 mm (9.6 in)
- Tires: Front: 110/70VR17; Rear: 140/60VR18 (1991 model-year)
- Rake, trail: 94 mm (3.7 in)
- Wheelbase: 1,425 mm (56.1 in)
- Dimensions: L: 2,096 mm (82.5 in); W: 27.6 in (700 mm); H: 45.5 in (1,160 mm)
- Seat height: 785 mm (30.9 in)
- Weight: 181 kg (399 lb) (dry)
- Fuel capacity: 18 L (4.0 imp gal; 4.8 US gal)
- Oil capacity: 3.1 L (0.68 imp gal; 0.82 US gal)
- Related: Yamaha FZR250; Yamaha FZR400; Yamaha FZR750; Yamaha FZR1000; Yamaha FZR750R

The Yamaha FZR600 is a sports motorcycle produced by Yamaha between 1988 and 1996 (1999 in the USA).

It was the successor to the FZ600 and was replaced by the Yamaha YZF600R in 1997. Unlike the other displacement FZR models released, the FZR600 was an export specific model mainly targeting the UK and US markets, and thus was not sold for the Japanese domestic market. It essentially used the same deltabox frame and swingarm of the FZR750, but replaced the 5-valve per cylinder 749cc inline-4 with a 4-valve per cylinder 599cc inline-4 engine. FZR600 models inherently did not include EXUP; those that had were only offered to countries and regions that had strict emission regulations, such as models sold in the state of California, which necessitated more efficient means of performance under restrictive equipment.

== The "Deltabox" frame Design ==
The Yamaha FZR600 engine was slanted forward in the frame. This was the basis of the Genesis engine and Delta Box frame concept, and helped to lower the center of gravity and help centralize mass. This layout allowed the real fuel tank to sit behind the cylinders, low between the frame rails, and further aided with lowering the center of gravity. Forward of this sat the airbox, with four 32 mm Mikuni downdraft carburetors, and all these assemblies were covered by a plastic cover dummy petrol tank.

== The 4-Valve design and the "EXUP" exhaust valve ==
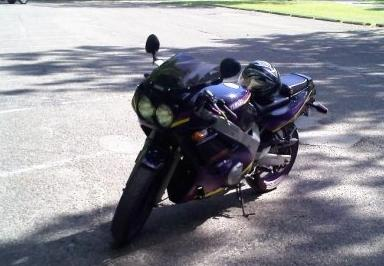
1989 FZR600

Unlike the larger FZR models which had featured three intake valves and two exhaust valves per cylinder, the FZR600 had a four valve per cylinder layout (which the FZR250 and FZR400 also used), which was necessitated by the different gas flow characteristics of the engine over the 750 and 1,000 cc units in the FZR range. Certain FZR600 models sold came with the EXUP valve system, located in the lower exhaust manifold. It helps maintain high back pressure at low engine speeds, and opens up more at higher engine speeds, giving the motor better mid-range power. The EXUP system was mainly found in US and some European models to compensate for the loss of power caused by emissions related modifications for those markets. Standard world market models produced 99 bhp (74 kW), compared to about 91 bhp (68 kW) for EXUP equipped versions.

== Changes over the years ==
The original steel-framed '3HE' FZR600 remained virtually unchanged throughout its production which began in 1988.

== 1990 ==
In 1990, the rear wheel width was increased to 4 inches, up from the 3.5-inch wheel which was stock for the 1988-1989 models. In the same year the front brake calipers were upgraded to 4-piston units (as opposed to the 2-piston calipers on the 1988-1989 models).

== 1991-1992 ==
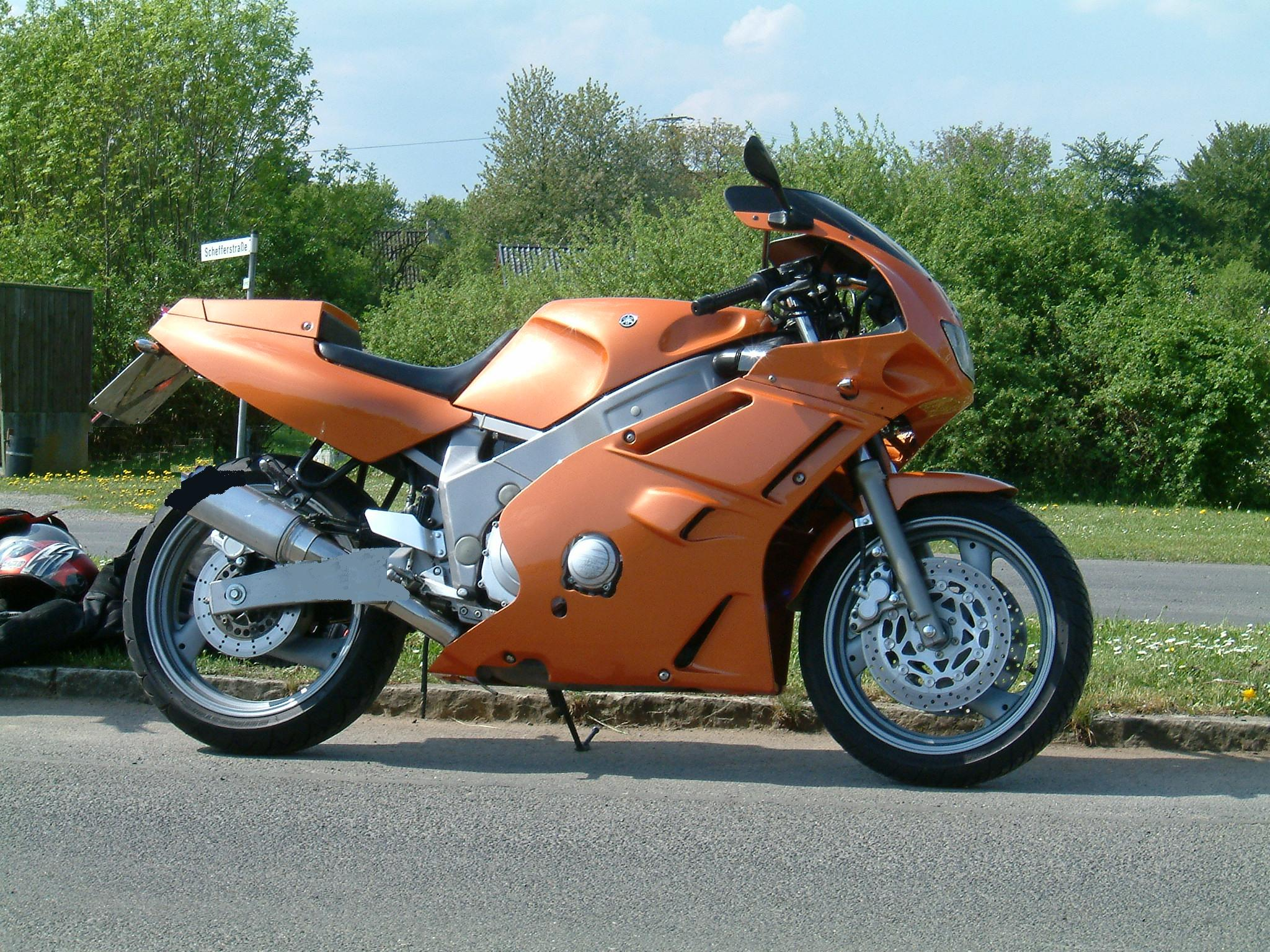
1991 FZR600 "Trapezoidal"

In 1991 the FZR received a single trapezoid headlamp to ape its FZR1000 EXUP sibling. The FZR also received a different swingarm, which was slightly fatter in profile. Aside from the minor mechanical changes, the paintwork and color schemes were the main change for each new model year, including the Vance and Hines special edition scheme that was available for 1992, of which only 636 were produced.

== 1993 ==
Yamaha ended up reverting to the twin round headlamp design for 1993.

== 1994 ==
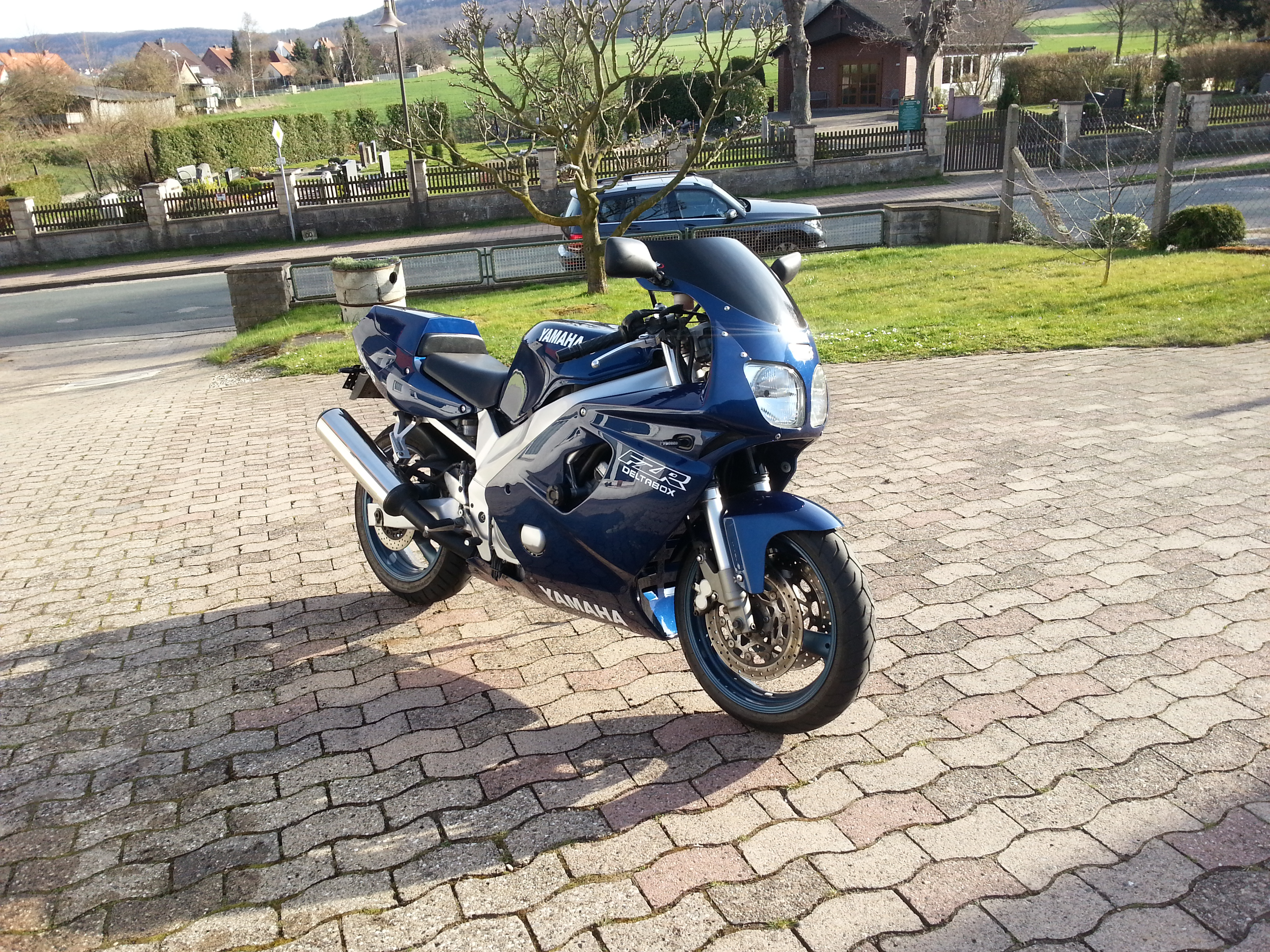
1994 FZR600 "Cats eyes"

In 1994 we saw the introduction of the 4JH model exclusively for the European and Asian markets, the main difference being the replacing of the twin circular headlights with the now famous twin "Cats eyes" style headlights that also happen to be found on the successor of the FZR600, the 1994-1996 YZF600R. Along with some minor bodywork changes in order to update the styling and accompany the new headlights.
