= Yamaha YX600 Radian =

YX600 Radian
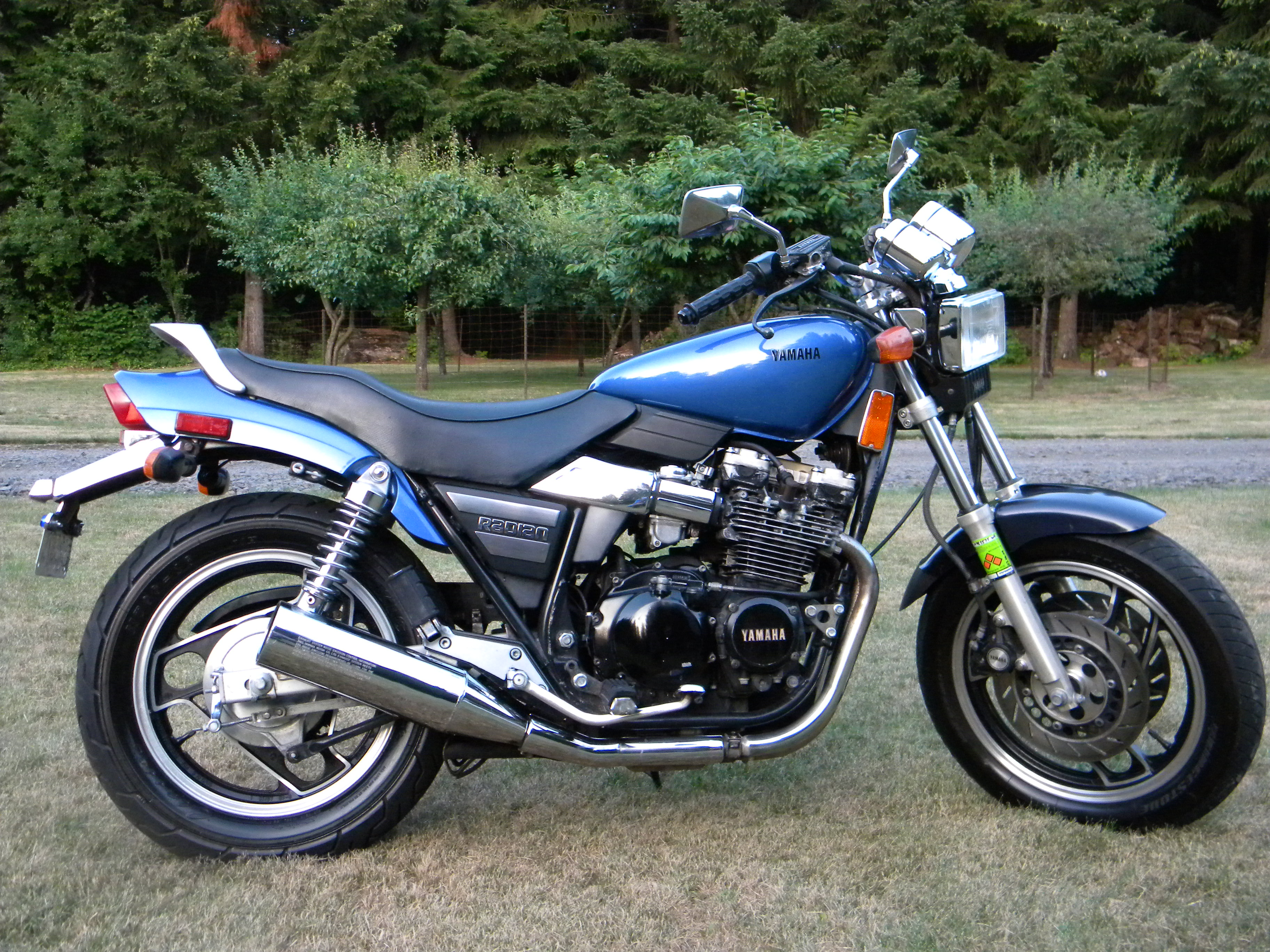
- Manufacturer: Yamaha Motor Company
- Parent company: Yamaha
- Production: 1986 — 1990
- Class: Naked bike (standard)
- Engine: 598cc, air-cooled, DOHC, inline-4
- Top speed: 125 mph (201 km/h)
- Power: 66 hp (49 kW)@ 9,500rpm (claimed); 56 hp (42 kW)@ 9,500rpm (rear wheel)
- Torque: 38 lb⋅ft (52 N⋅m) @ 7,500 rpm (claimed)
- Wheelbase: 54.7 in (1,390 mm)
- Weight: 198 kg (436 lb) (wet)
- Fuel capacity: 12 L; 2.7 imp gal (3.3 US gal)
- Oil capacity: 2,200 ml (2.3 US qt)
- Fuel consumption: 4.9 L/100 km; 58 mpg_{‑imp} (48 mpg_{‑US})

The YX600 Radian is a sport/touring motorcycle manufactured by the Yamaha Motor Company between the years of 1986–1990. Except for the suspension, the rest of the Radian was a parts-bin motorcycle and came equipped with a slightly detuned for mid and low-end torque version of air-cooled, inline-4 which came from the Yamaha XJ600 that was also along with the Radian used in the Yamaha FZ-600 Sport Motorcycle (precursor of Yamaha's FZR series of performance bikes), as well as smaller carburetors and frame from the 550 Maxim. Cycle World obtained for the Radian a 1/4 mi. time of 12.76 @ 103.8 mph (167.0 km/h) and 0 to 60 mph (0 to 97 km/h) acceleration at 3.8 seconds.

== Specifications ==
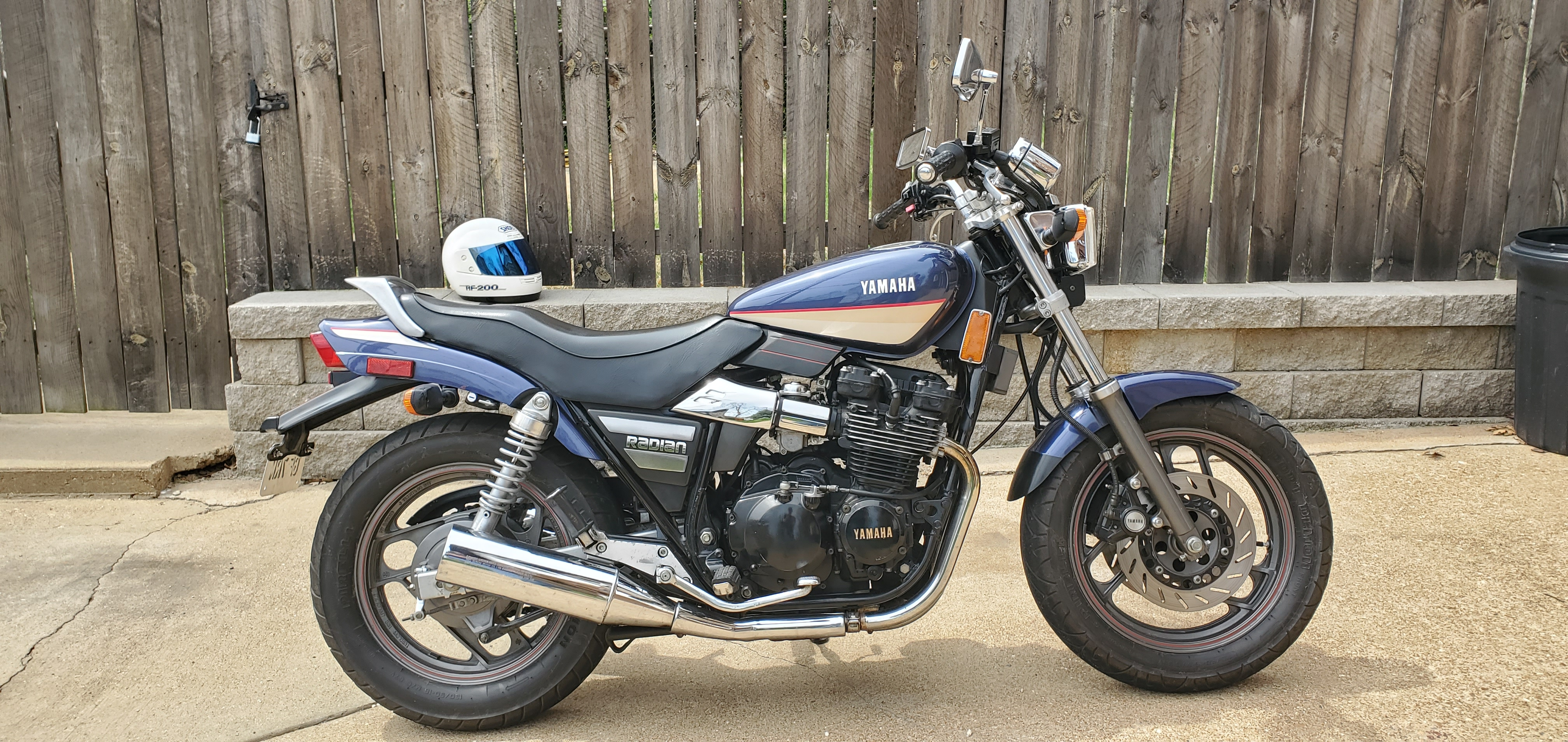
Stock 1989 Yamaha YX600 Radian

Overall length	2,075 mm (81.7 in)
Overall width	770 mm (30.3 in)
Overall height	1,095 mm (43.1 in)
Model	1UJ (YX600S), 1UL (YX600SC)
Displacement	598 cc
Bore x Stroke	58.5 x 55.7 mm (2.3 x 2.2 in)
Compression ratio	10.0 : 1
Starting system	electric starter
Lubrication system	Wet sump
Engine oil capacity (total amount)	2.9 L (2.5 Imp qt, 3.1 US qt)
Fuel tank capacity	12 L (2.6 Imp gal, 3.2 US gal)
Fuel reserve amount	2.5 L (0.5 Imp gal, 0.7 US gal)
Carburetor type/manufacturer	BS30 x 4/MIKUNI
Clutch type	Wet, multi-disc
Transmission - Primary reduction system	Chain, Gear
Transmission - Secondary reduction system	Chain drive
Transmission type	Constant mesh 6-speed
Frame type	Double cradle
Caster angle	27°
Trail	128 mm (5.04 in)
Tire size (front)	110/90-16-59H
Tire size (rear)	130/90-16 67H
Brake type (front)	Dual, disk brake
Brake type (rear)	Drum brake
Suspension (front)	Telescopic fork
Suspension (rear)	Swing arm
Shock absorber (front)	Coil spring, oil damper
Shock absorber (rear)	Coil spring, oil damper
Wheel travel (front)	140 mm (5.5 in)
Wheel travel (rear)	98 mm (3.9 in)
Ignition system	TCI
Generator system	AC generator
Battery type/capacity	12N 12A-4A/12V 12AH
