= Yamaha Thundercat =

Sports bike

Yamaha YZF600R
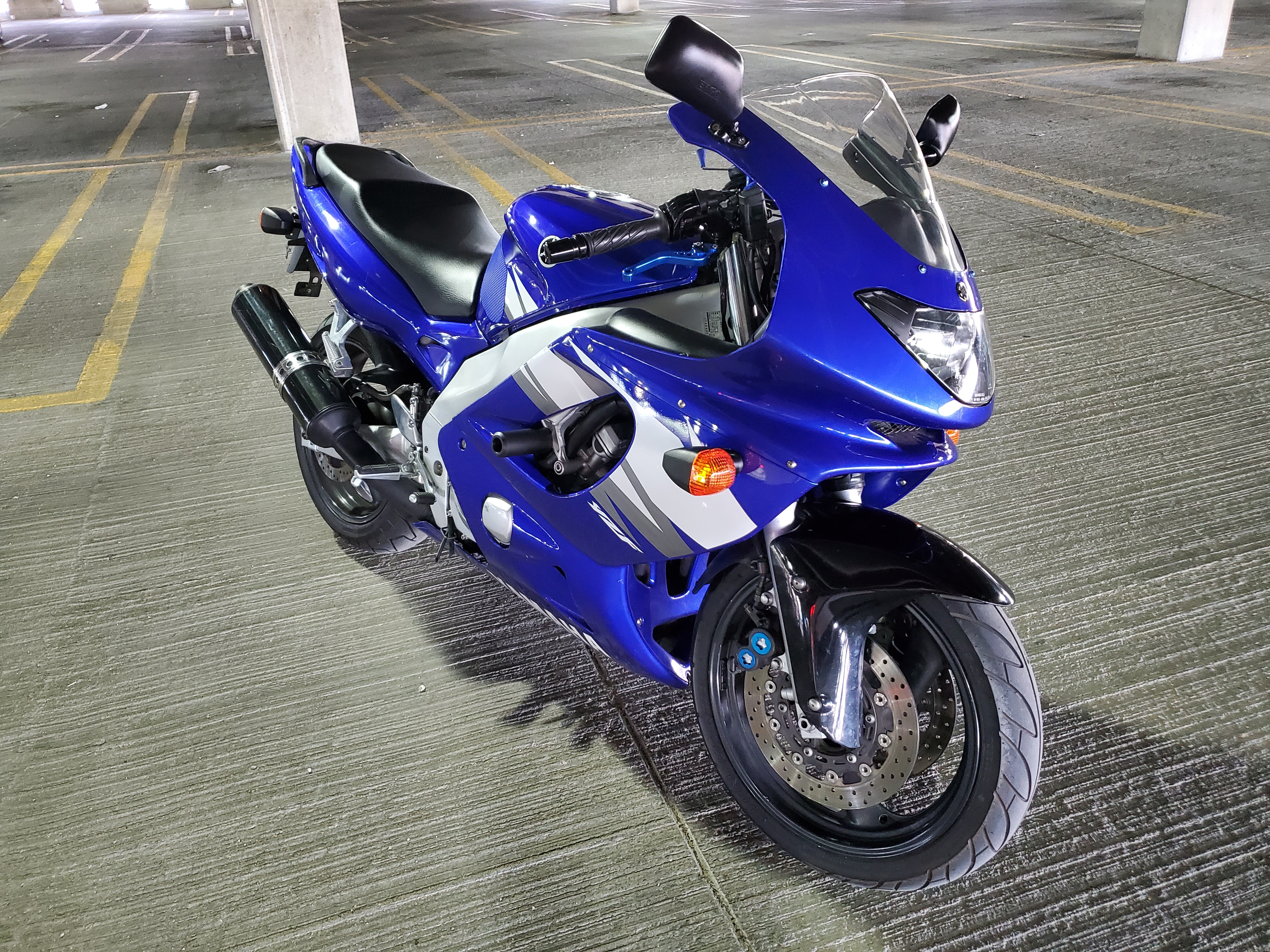
- 2001 Yamaha YZF600R Thundercat
- Manufacturer: Yamaha Motor Company
- Also called: Thundercat
- Production: 1994–2007
- Predecessor: FZR600
- Successor: YZF-R6
- Class: Sport bike
- Engine: 599 cc (36.6 cu in), liquid-cooled, DOHC, 16 valve, inline four 4×36 mm Keihin CV downdraft carburetors
- Bore / stroke: 62 mm × 49.6 mm (2.44 in × 1.95 in)
- Power: 100.6 hp (75.0 kW) @ 11,500 rpm
- Torque: 48.4 lbf⋅ft (65.6 N⋅m) @ 9,500 rpm
- Transmission: 6-speed sequential manual
- Frame type: Deltabox
- Suspension: Adjustable preload, compression, rebound Front: 41 mm telescopic fork 130 mm (5.1 in) travel Rear: Monoshock w/remote reservoir 120 mm (4.7 in) travel
- Brakes: Front 2×D298 mm floating discs 4-piston calipers Rear:245 mm disc
- Tires: Front: 120/60-ZR17; Rear: 160/60 ZR17
- Rake, trail: 25.0°, 97 mm (3.82 in)
- Wheelbase: 1,410 mm (55.7 in)
- Dimensions: L: 2,060 mm (81.1 in); W: 725 mm (28.54 in)
- Seat height: 810 mm (31.7 in)
- Fuel capacity: 19 L (4.2 imp gal; 5.0 US gal)
- Related: Yamaha FZS600 Fazer

The Yamaha YZF600R (Thundercat in European markets) is a 599 cc (36.6 cu in) sports bike made by Yamaha from 1996 to 2007.

== Overview ==
The YZF600R Thundercat was introduced to the USA in 1994 (Europe in 1996) as a replacement to the FZR600R. During the 1997 European 600 super sport championship season, the YZF600R Thundercat was the only four-cylinder motorcycle to win a race against the dominant Ducati 748.

== Model lifecycle ==
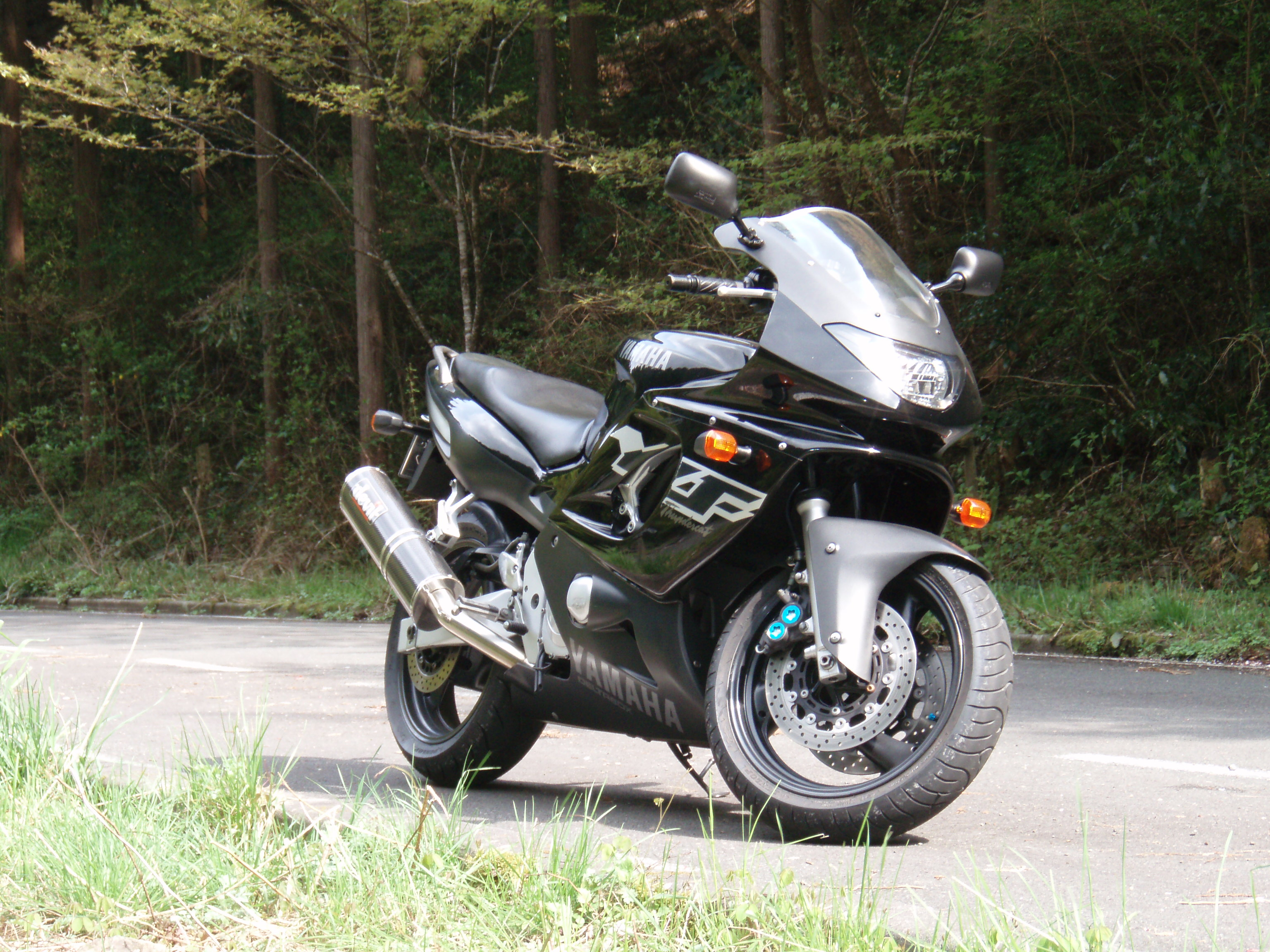
YZF600R 1997

Yamaha sold the YZF600R Thundercat in Europe from 1996 to 2003, and from 1994 to 2008 in the United States and Canada. From 1994 to 1996 the YZF600R had distinctive twin "Cats eye" headlights. In 1997 it was updated to have a single rounded triangular headlight, and it left behind the more boxy 1980s/1990s style fairings in favor of a more curvaceous design which was popular at that time. In 1997 the YZF600R exhaust system and wiring loom were updated, after which it received little more than periodic minor aesthetic and color changes. The Thundercat was equipped with 4×36 mm Keihin CV downdraft carburetors for the entirety of its production from 1994 to its last year of production in 2007.

== Parts from the FZR600R ==
It retained many major mechanical components from the FZR600R such as the 599cc 4-cylinder engine, 6-speed transmission, suspension components, and steel "Deltabox" perimeter frame.

== Opinions of the press ==
In 1998 Sport Rider magazine said the YZF600R is "More fun on the racetrack than we ever dreamed, brakes that embarrassed the rest of the field. Consensus: Best middleweight street bike on the planet."

Motor Cycle News describes the YZF600R as more suited to sport touring than aggressive sport or road racing., while the fully adjustable Kayaba suspension and Sumitomo "Blue Spot" mono-block calipers, later used on the R1, R6 and other models, also make it a good choice for track racing.
