= Yamaha YZF-R6 =

Sport motorcycle

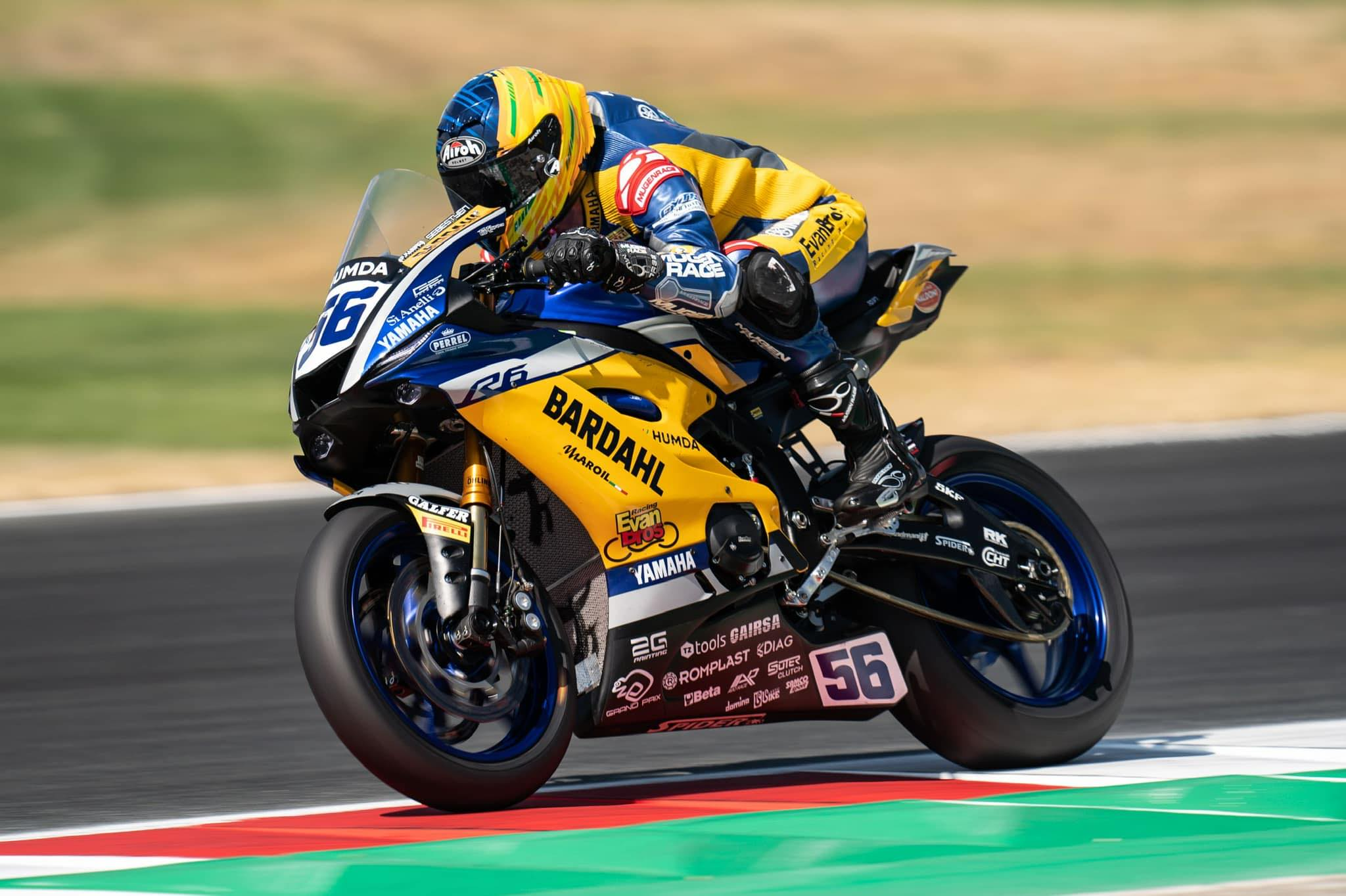
- Manufacturer: Yamaha Motor Company
- Also called: Yamaha R6
- Production: 1999–2020
- Predecessor: Yamaha YZF600R
- Class: Sport bike
- Engine: 600 cc (37 cu in) transverse inline four
- Related: Yamaha YZF-R1; Yamaha YZF-R Series

The Yamaha YZF-R6 is a sport bike, produced by Yamaha as a 600 class from 1999 to 2020. From 2021, production availability is limited to a non-homologated race-only specification in most global markets, causing race organizers to realign their engine eligibility criteria to encourage other manufacturers having larger than 600 cc displacements to enter road-race competition from 2022.

Race organizers wanted to provide scope for alternative machinery to move away from established tradition of the Yamaha R6 being the dominant marque in Supersport racing. A similar motorcycle currently in production is the YZF-R9. This motorcycle is widely considered to be the R6's successor but this has never been officially stated by Yamaha.

== History ==
=== The Original ===
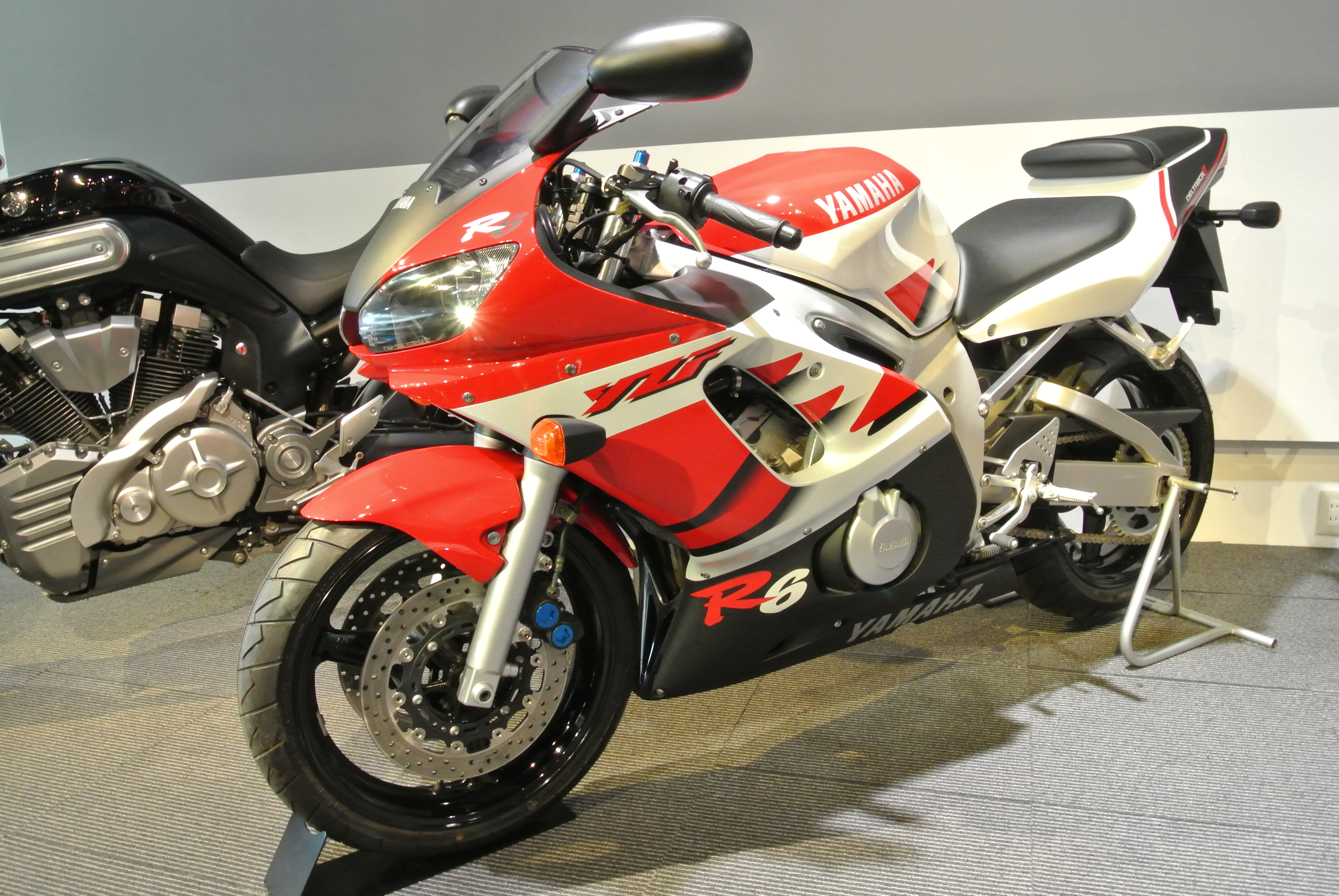
1999 YZF-R6

The YZF-R6 was introduced in 1999 as the super-sport version of YZF-R1 super bike, and as a companion to the more street-oriented YZF600R sport bike, which continued to be sold alongside the R6. The motorcycle featured Yamaha's completely new engine design capable of producing over 108 hp (81 kW) while stationary. The R6 was the world's first 600 cc production four-stroke motorcycle producing over 100 hp (75 kW) in stock form.

=== 2003 Redesign ===
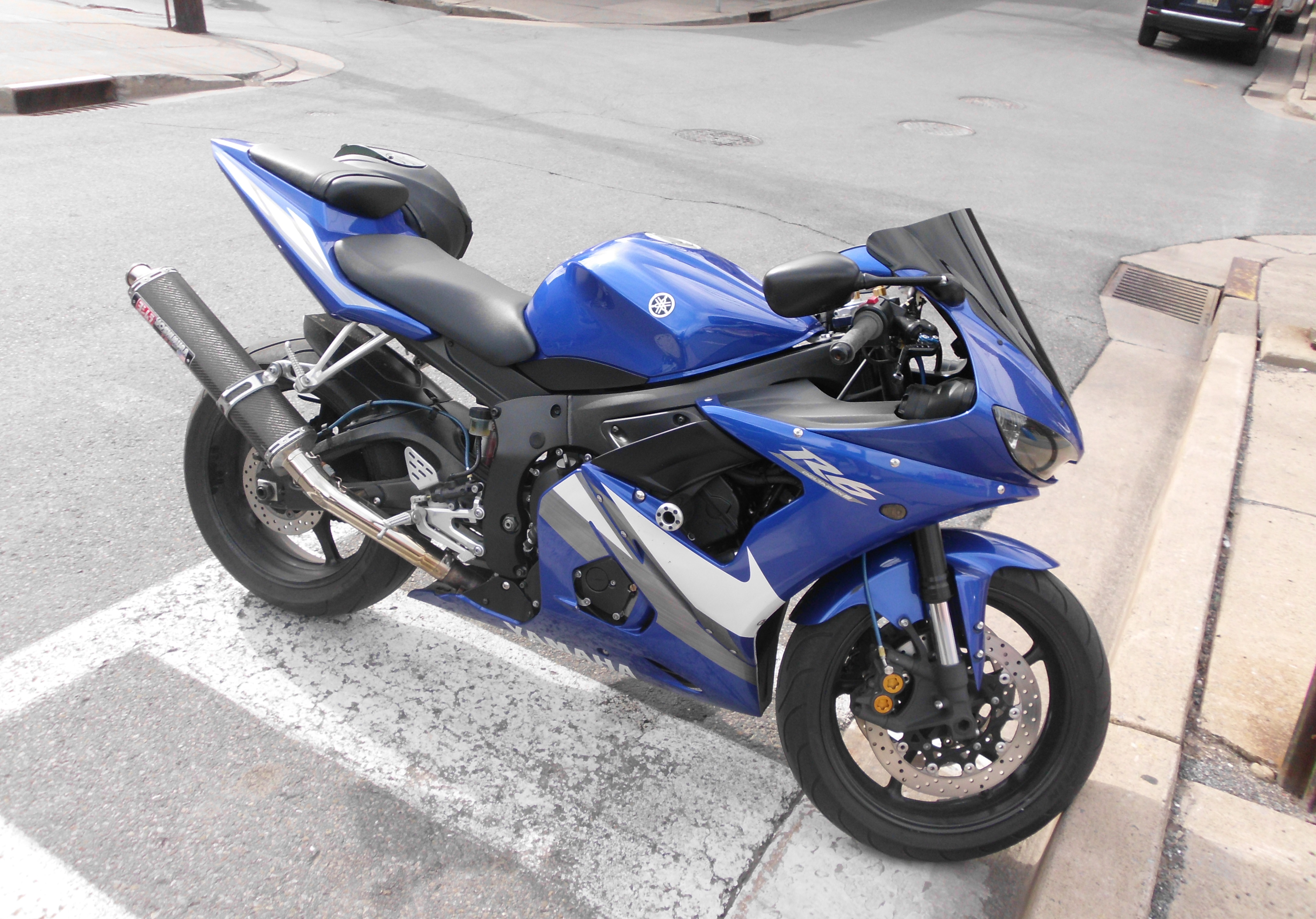
2003 YZF-R6

The YZF-R6 has been revised several times since its introduction. Starting in 2003, the R6 became fuel injected. It also received a new headlight design that was more reminiscent of its bigger brother the YZF-R1.

=== 2006 Redesign and the "tachometer problem" ===
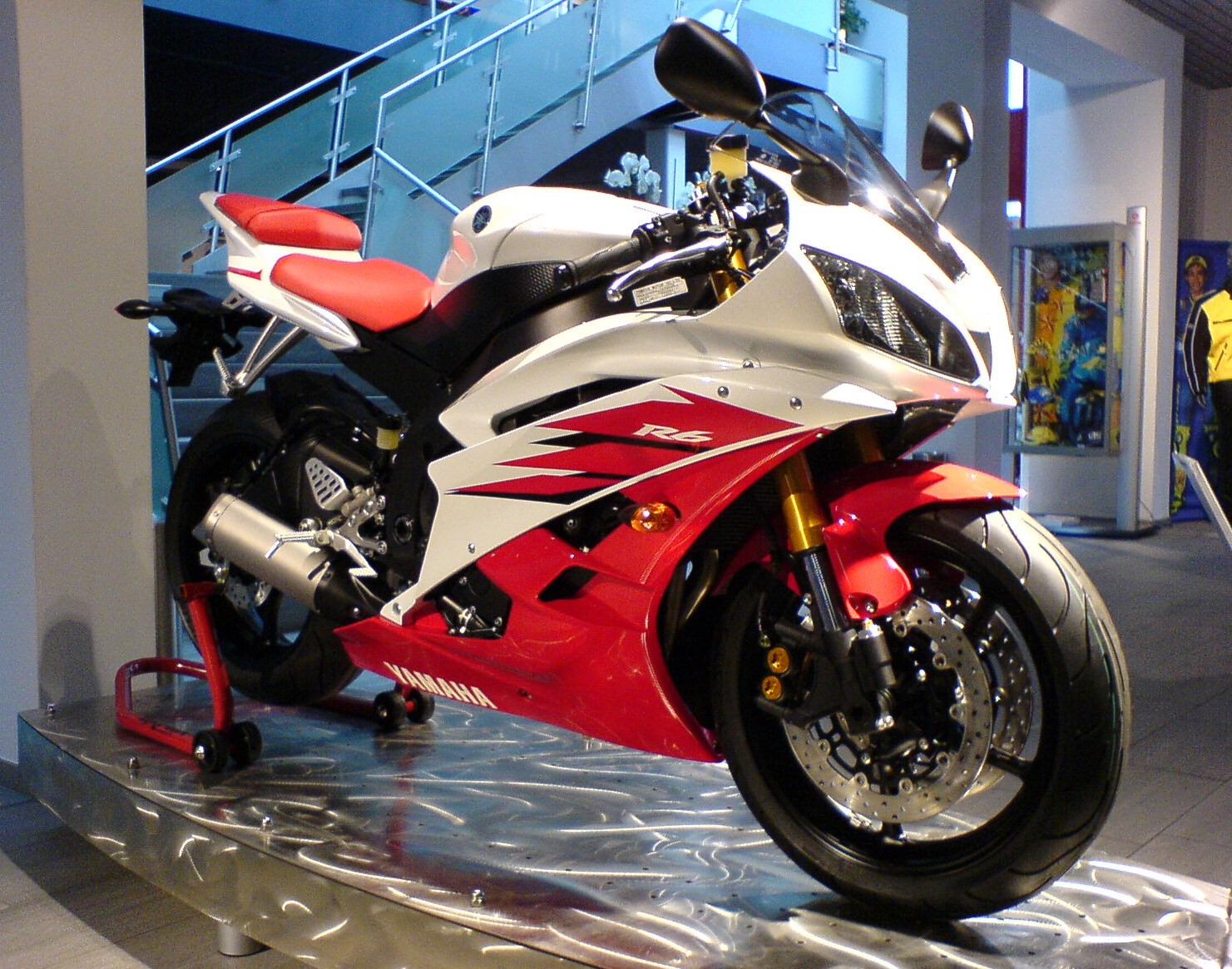
2006 YZF-R6

The 2006 model year was a significant upgrade with a new engine-management system featuring the YCC-T ride by wire throttle and a multiplate slipper clutch. The 2008 model incorporated the YCC-I variable-length intake system to optimize power at high engine speeds, a slight change in exterior bodywork for better aerodynamics, and an improved Deltabox frame design.

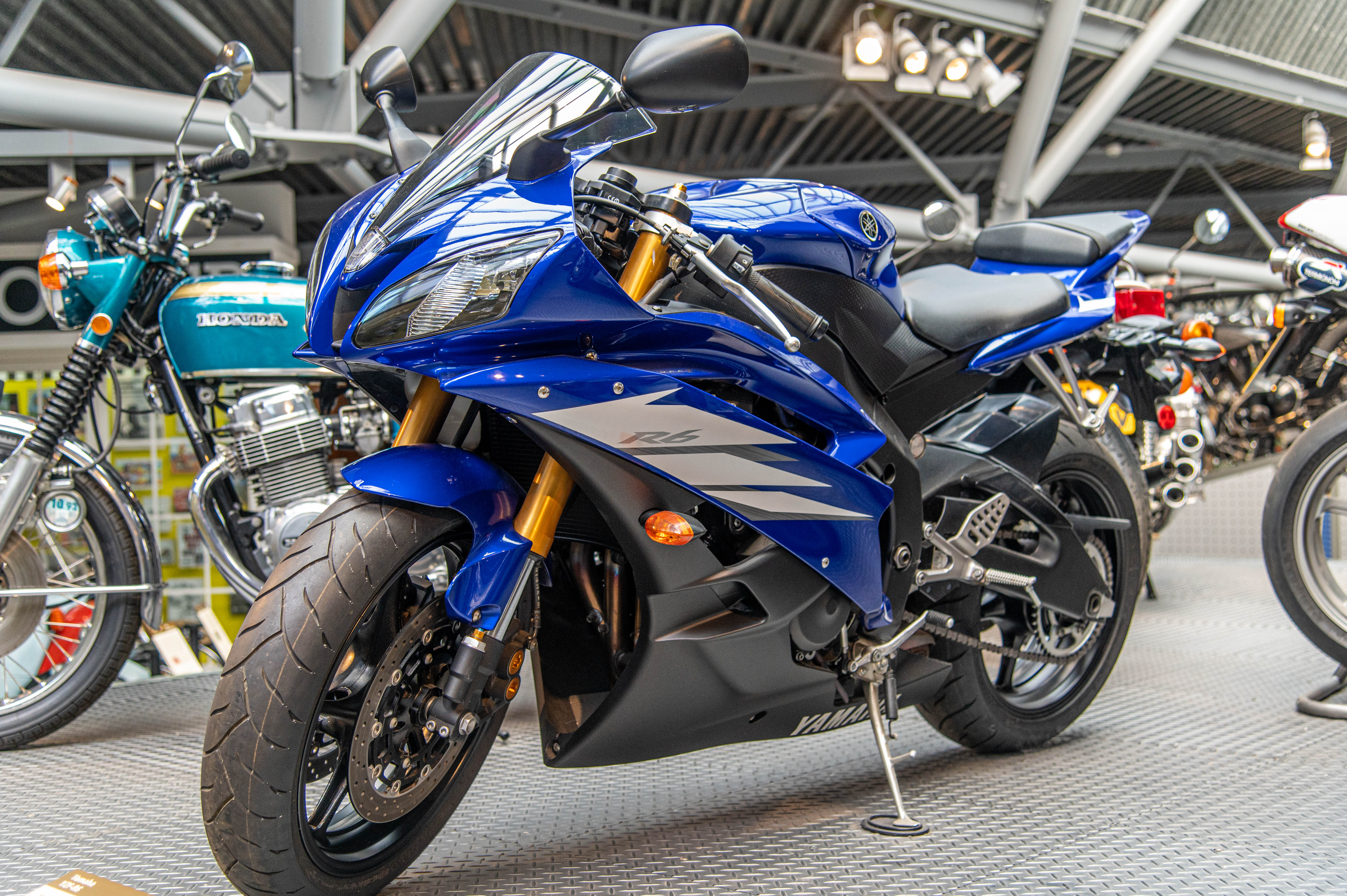
2006 YZF-R6

In 2006, Yamaha advertised that the R6 had a redline of 17,500 rpm. This is 2,000 rpm higher than the previous R6 model and was the highest tachometer redline of any 2006 production four-stroke motorcycle engine. The true maximum engine speed was limited by the ECU to 15,800 rpm. In February 2006, Yamaha admitted the bike's true engine redline was more than 1,000 rpm lower than what was indicated on the tachometer and had been advertised, and offered to buy back any R6 if the customer was unhappy.

=== 2017 Redesign ===
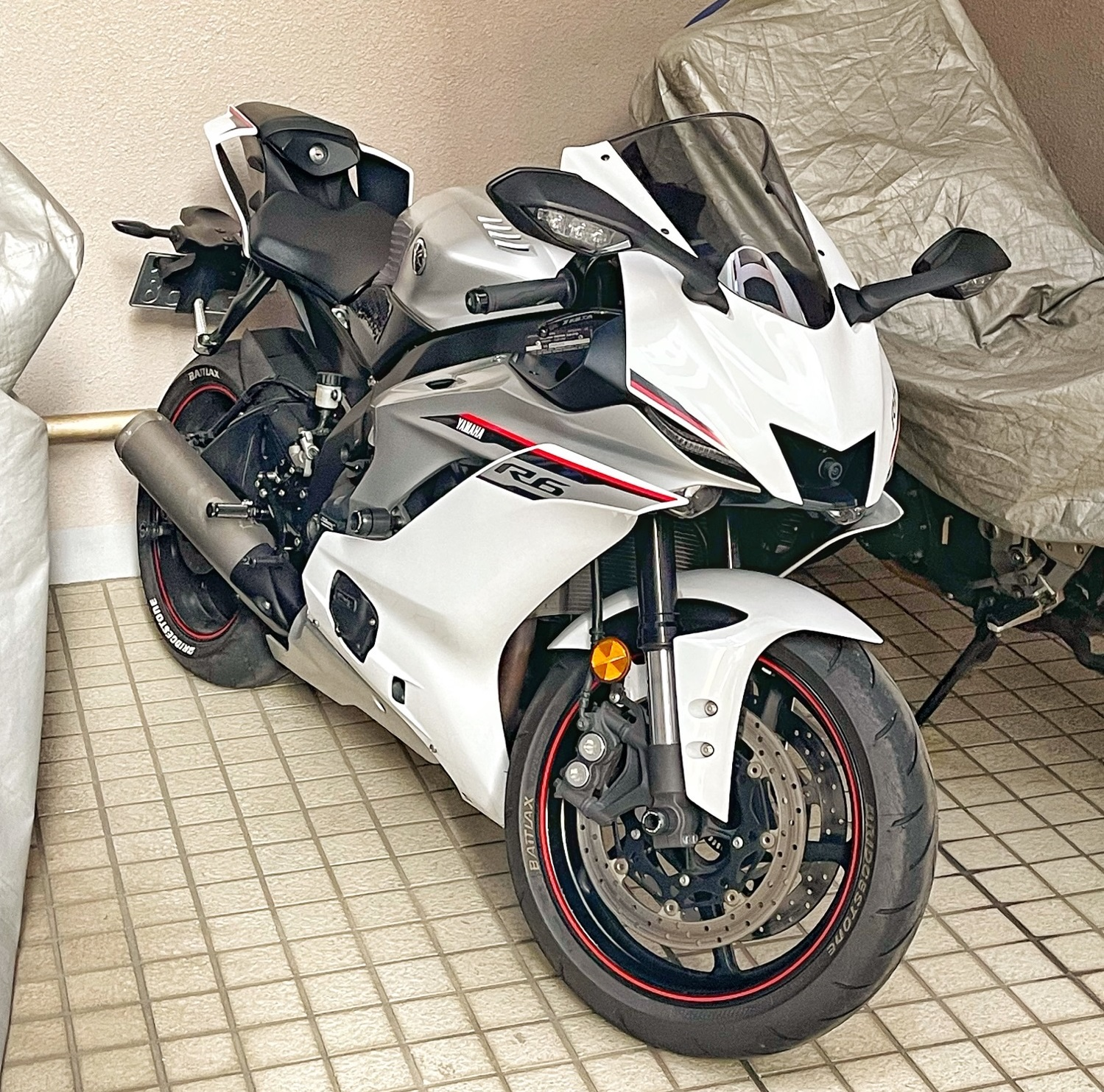
2018 YZF-R6

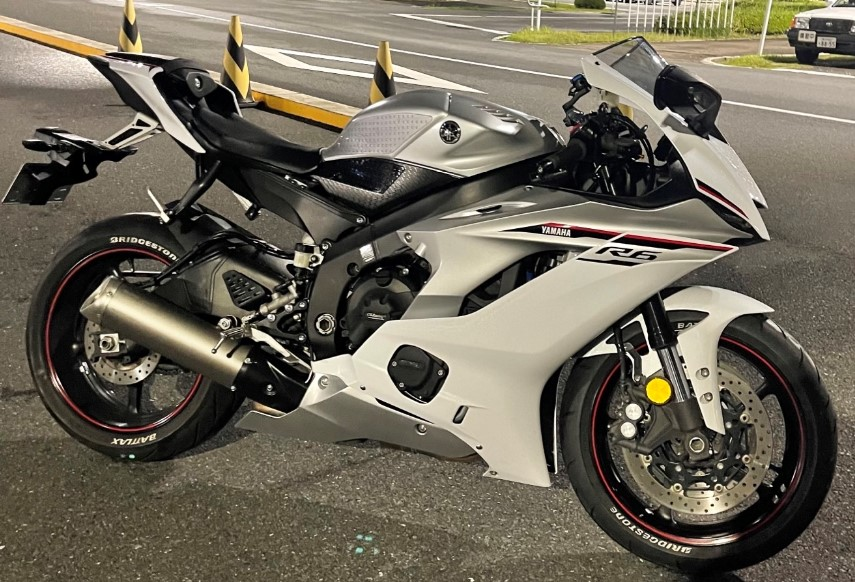
2018 YZF-R6

In 2017 the R6 received improved aerodynamics with styling inspired by the 2015 R1, as well as its 43 mm inverted front fork and front brakes, new rear shock, a new aluminum fuel tank, magnesium subframe, ABS brakes, riding modes, and traction control. The new aerodynamics are claimed to reduce drag by 8% over previous models. The engine is unchanged, with rear-wheel power still at about 120 hp. Body is similar to MotoGPs 2005– YZR-M1.

The 2017 update comes with an OBD port. Unlike previous models, this R6 does not have the same diagnostic mode option. To retrieve the diagnostic codes, an adapter that plugs into any OBD-II scanner is needed.

=== The R6's History in Motorsports ===
Chaz Davies helped Yamaha to win both the riders and manufacturers title during the 2011 Supersport World Championship season. The bike also won the super-sport category at the 2008 North West 200 Races.

== Specifications ==
	1999–2000	2001–2002	2003–2004	2005	2006–2007	2008–2009	2010–2016	2017-2020
Engine	DOHC, 16-valve, liquid-cooled, four-stroke, inline four-cylinder							
Displacement	599.8 cc (36.60 cu in)					599.4 cc (36.58 cu in), titanium valves		
Bore × stroke	65.5 mm × 44.5 mm (2.58 in × 1.75 in)				67.0 mm × 42.5 mm (2.64 in × 1.67 in)			
Compression ratio	12.4:1				12.8:1	13.1:1		
Horsepower	73.7 kW (98.9 hp) @ 12,500 rpm (rear wheel)	79.7 kW (106.9 hp) @ 12,500 rpm (rear wheel)	86.0 kW (115.3 bhp) @ 13,000 rpm (claimed)	88.2 kW (118.3 bhp) @ 13,000 rpm (claimed)	93.4 kW (125.3 bhp) @ 14,500 rpm (claimed)	94.9 kW (127.3 bhp) @ 14,500 rpm (claimed)	91.0 kW (122.0 bhp) @ 14,500 rpm (claimed)	87.1 kW (116.8 bhp) @ 14,500 rpm (claimed)
Torque	57.2 N⋅m (42.2 lb⋅ft) @ 10,500 rpm	59.2–60.2 J (43.7–44.4 ft⋅lb) @ 11,000 rpm	60.6 N⋅m (44.7 lb⋅ft) @ 11,750 rpm	60.5 N⋅m (44.6 lb⋅ft) @ 12,000 rpm	59.4 N⋅m (43.8 lb⋅ft) @ 11,500 rpm	58.7 N⋅m (43.3 lb⋅ft) @ 10,500 rpm	57.5 N⋅m (42.4 lb⋅ft) @ 11,500 rpm	61.7 N⋅m (45.5 lb⋅ft) @ 10,500 rpm
Fuel system	37 mm carburetors	37 mm Keihin CV Downdraft w/throttle position sensor	Fuel injection		Fuel injection w/ YCC-T	Fuel Injection w/YCC-T and YCC-I		
Ignition	CDI		Digital DC-CDI		TCI (Transistor Controlled Ignition)			
Drivetrain	multi-plate clutch, 6-speed #532 O-ring chain				multi-plate slipper clutch, 6-speed, #525 O-ring chain			
Chain and Sprockets	Front Sprocket: 16 teeth Rear Sprocket: 48 teeth Chain: 116 links, 532 Pitch		Front Sprocket: 16 teeth Rear Sprocket: 48 teeth Chain: 116 links, 532 Pitch		Front Sprocket: 16 teeth Rear Sprocket: 45 teeth Chain: 116 links, 525 Pitch			
Suspension	Front: fully adjustable 43 mm telescopic fork Rear: fully adjustable monoshock	Front: fully adjustable 43 mm telescopic fork, 130 mm (5.3 in) of travel Rear:	Front: 43 mm telescopic fork w/adjustable preload, compression and rebound damping; 120 mm (4.7 in) travel Rear:	Front: 41 mm inverted telescopic fork w/adjustable preload, separate high & low-speed compression damping, rebound damping; 120 mm (4.7 in) travel Rear:				Front: 43 mm inverted fork, 3-way adjustable; 120 mm (4.7 in) travel Rear: 4-way adjustable; 120 mm (4.7 in) travel
Tires	Front: 120/60-ZR17 Rear: 180/55-ZR17			Front: 120/70-ZR17 Rear: 180/55-ZR17				
Brakes	Front: 2×295 mm floating disc		Front: 2x298 mm disc Rear: 220 mm disc	Front: 2x310mm floating disc Rear: 220mm disc				Front: 2x320 mm hydraulic disc Rear:220 mm hydraulic disc
Length		2,100 mm (81 in)	2,020 mm (79.7 in)		2,040 mm (80.3 in)			
Width		700 mm (27.6 in)	690 mm (27.2 in)		700 mm (27.6 in)			
Height		1,120 mm (44.2 in)	1,090 mm (42.9 in)		43.1 in (1,090 mm), 2011: 43.3 in (1,100 mm)			1,150 mm (45.3 in)
Seat height	810 mm (32.0 in)	830 mm (32.8 in)	820 mm (32.3 in)		850 mm (33.5 in)			
Wheelbase	1,400 mm (55.1 in)	1,380 mm (54.4 in)	1,380 mm (54.3 in)					1,370 mm (54.1 in)
Rake, trail			24°, 86 mm (3.4 in)		24°, 97 mm (3.8 in)			24°
Fuel capacity		17 L; 3.7 imp gal (4.5 US gal)			17 L; 3.8 imp gal (4.6 US gal)			17 L; 3.7 imp gal (4.5 US gal)
Dry weight	181–183 kg (398–404 lb) ('99)	181–181 kg (398–399 lb) ('01)	176 kg (388 lb) ('03); 392 lb (178 kg) ('04)	180 kg (397 lb)	180 kg (396 lb)	181 kg (399 lb)		
Wet weight	200 kg (430 lb)	193 kg (426 lb) ('01)	188 kg (415 lb) ('03); 190 kg (419 lb) ('04)	192 kg (424 lb)		189 kg (417 lb)	189 kg (417 lb)	190 kg (419 lb)
Performance
0 to 60 mph (0 to 97 km/h)	3.0–3.35 sec.	2.8 sec.			3.0 sec.			
0 to 1/4 mi (0.00 to 0.40 km)	10.97 @ 201.46 km/h (125.18 mph) 10.97 @ 204.56 km/h (127.11 mph)	10.80 sec. @ 206.49 km/h (128.31 mph)			10.67 sec. @ 210.49 km/h (130.79 mph)			
Top speed	253–257 km/h (157–160 mph)	253 km/h (157 mph)			260 km/h (160 mph)			
Fuel economy	6.19–6.17 L/100 km; 45.6–45.8 mpg_{‑imp} (38.0–38.1 mpg_{‑US})	6.4 L/100 km; 44 mpg_{‑imp} (37 mpg_{‑US})			7.0 L/100 km; 40.1 mpg_{‑imp} (33.4 mpg_{‑US})			
CO_{2}								154g/km
