= Yamaha FZR400 =

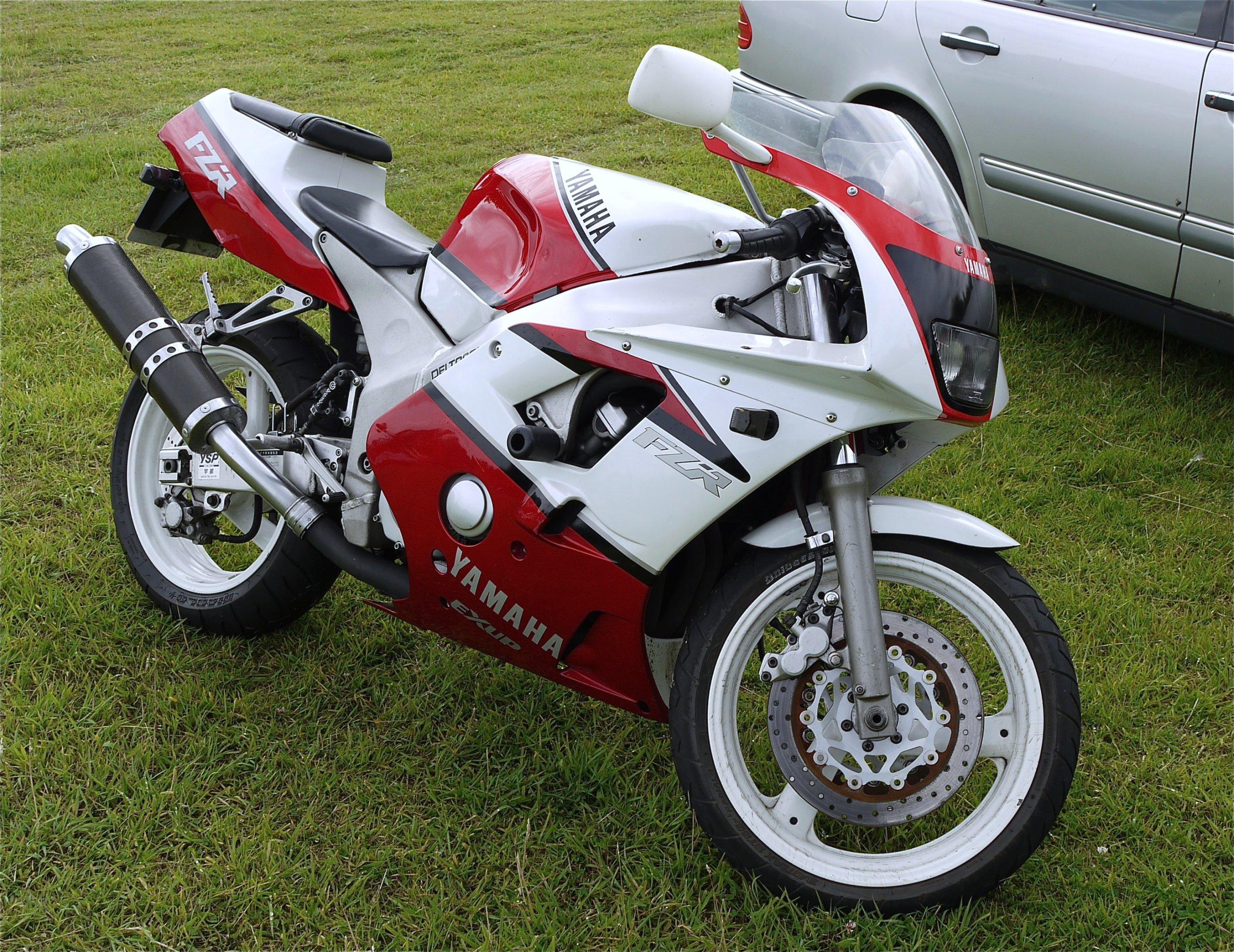
- Yamaha FZR400
- Manufacturer: Yamaha Motor Company
- Also called: FZR400R, FZR400RR
- Production: 1987–1994
- Predecessor: Yamaha FZ400R
- Class: Sport bike
- Engine: 399 cc (24.3 cu in) 16-valve DOHC transverse four-stroke inline-four, liquid cooled
- Bore / stroke: 56.0 mm × 40.5 mm (2.20 in × 1.59 in)
- Compression ratio: 11,5 : 1
- Power: 44 kW (59 hp) @ 12000 RPM
- Torque: 42.0 N⋅m (31.0 lbf⋅ft) @ 9500 RPM
- Dimensions: L: 2,040 mm (80 in); H: 1,170 mm (46 in)
- Seat height: 785 mm (30.9 in)
- Weight: 157 kg (346 lb) (dry); 185 kg (408 lb) (wet)
- Fuel capacity: 18 L (4.8 US gal)
- Related: Yamaha FZR600; Yamaha FZR1000; Yamaha FZ400R

The Yamaha FZR400 was a 400 cc (24 cu in) class sport bike produced by Yamaha Motor Company between 1987 and 1994. The FZR400 was updated every year up until 1994, after which production ended.

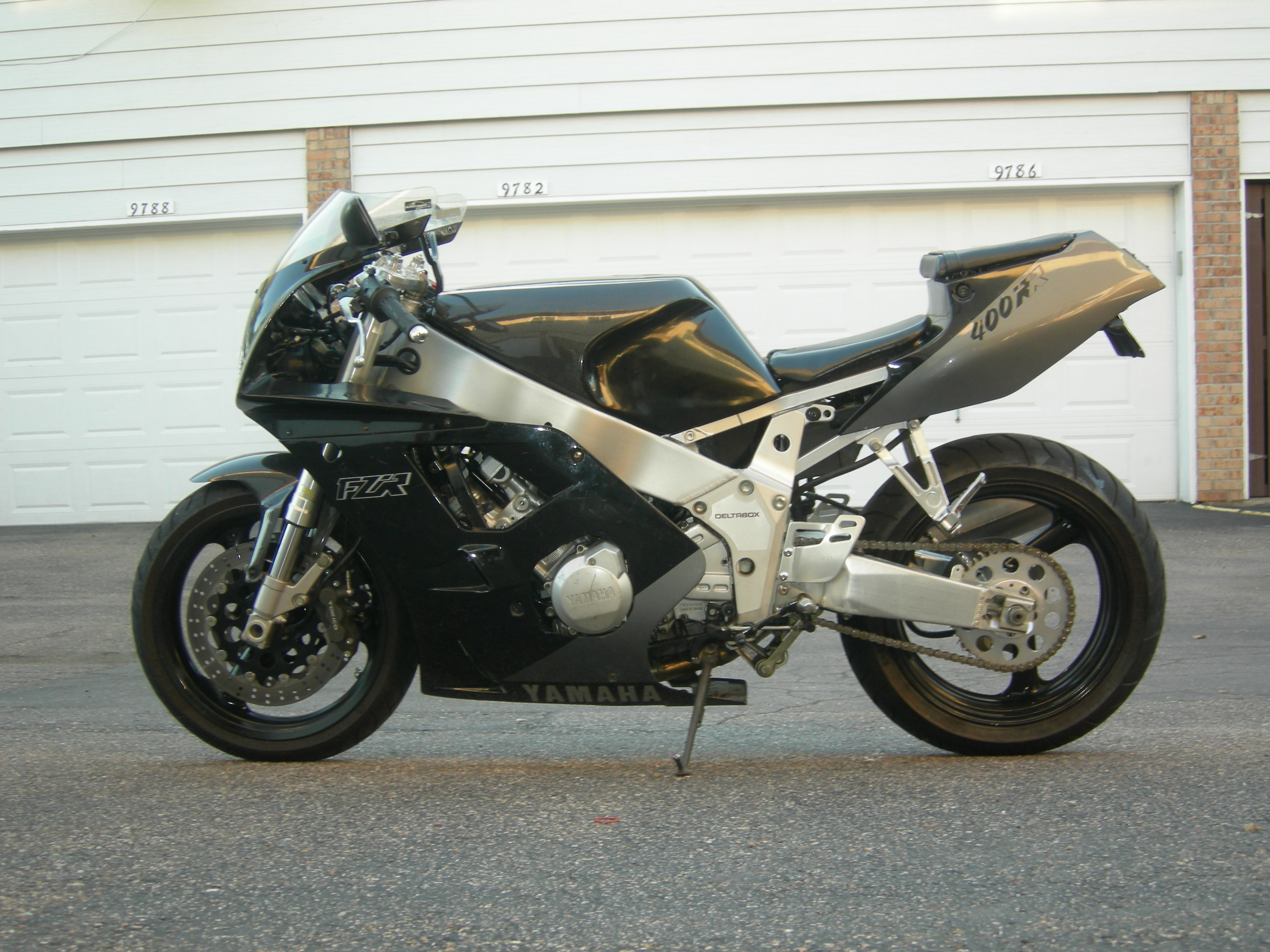
Yamaha FZR400R

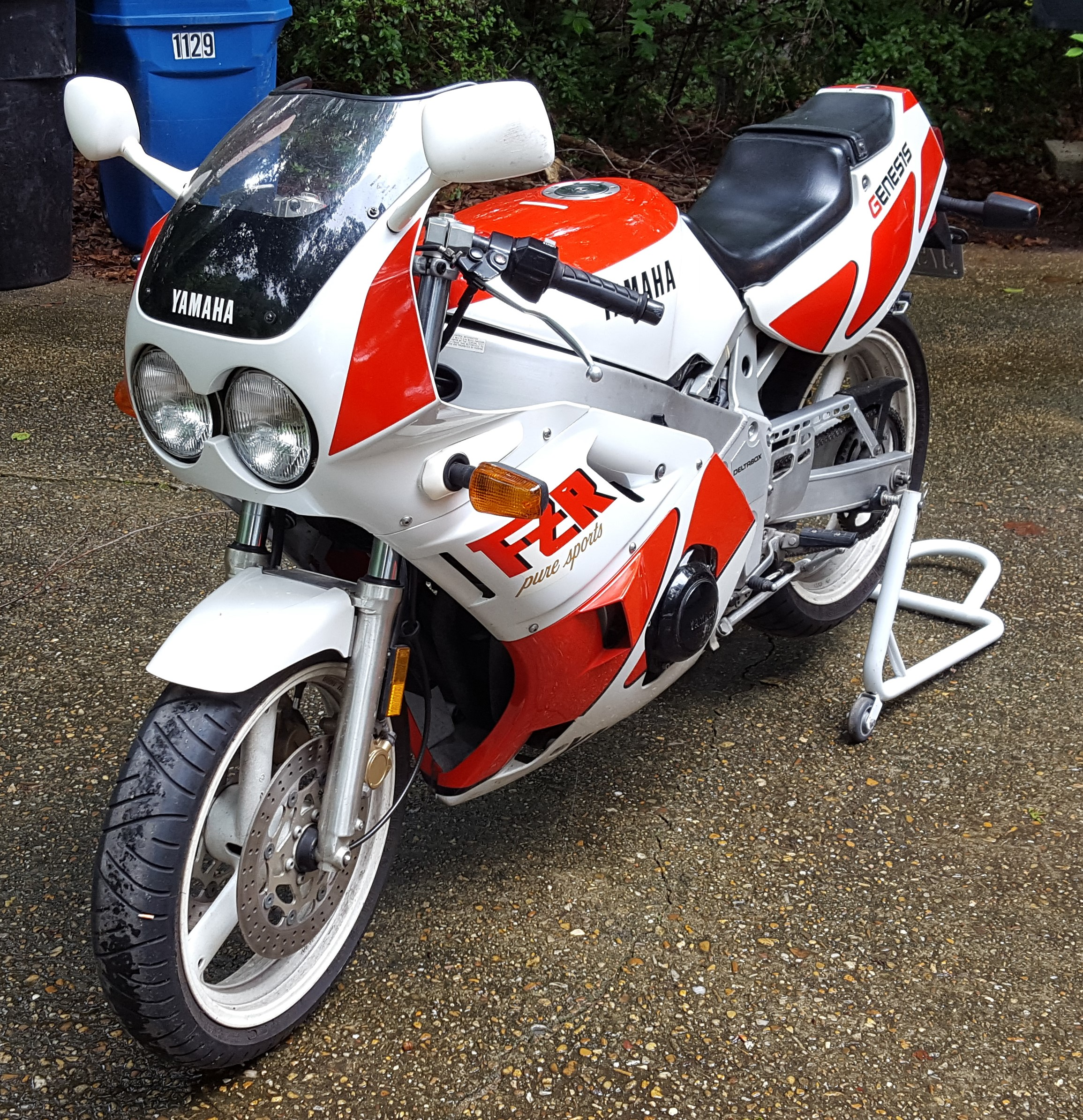
1988 Yamaha FZR400

All FZR400s were powered by naturally aspirated, carburetted, liquid-cooled 399cc four-stroke inline-four engines with four valves per cylinder and dual overhead camshafts (DOHC). These engines were all mounted transversely in perimeter type box-section aluminium 'Deltabox' frames. Although standard-fare for modern sport bikes, in 1988 this layout was quite unique. An earlier model called FZ400R was released only in Japan in 1984.

== See also ==
- Honda CBR400
- Honda RVF400
- Suzuki GSX-R400
- Kawasaki ZXR400
