= Kawasaki ZXR400 =

Kawasaki Ninja ZXR400
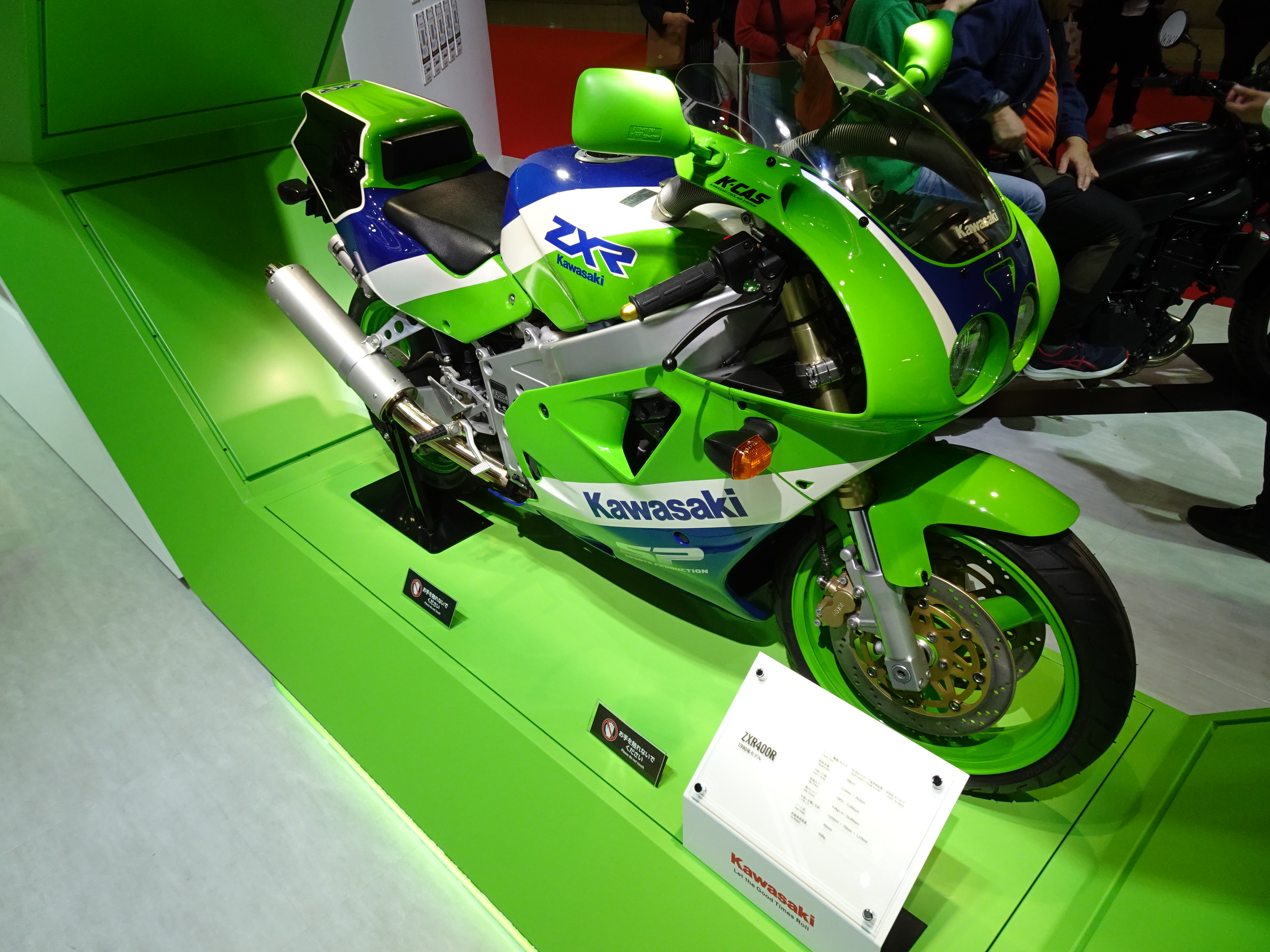
- Manufacturer: Kawasaki Motors
- Parent company: Kawasaki Heavy Industries
- Production: 1989–2003 (U.K)
- Successor: Kawasaki Ninja ZX-4R (2023)
- Class: Sport bike
- Engine: 398 cc (24.3 cu in) 16V DOHC liquid cooled inline 4
- Bore / stroke: 57 mm × 39 mm (2.2 in × 1.5 in)
- Compression ratio: 12.1:1
- Top speed: 225 km/h (140 mph)
- Power: H model 45.6 kW (61.2 hp) @ 12500 rpm L model 47.8 kW (64.1 hp) @ 13000 rpm
- Torque: H model 39.2 N⋅m (28.9 lbf⋅ft) @ 10000 r/min (rpm); L model 36.3 N⋅m (26.8 lbf⋅ft) @ 12000 rpm
- Ignition type: Battery and coil (transistorized)
- Transmission: 6-speed, constant mesh, return shift
- Frame type: Tubular, diamond
- Suspension: Front Telescopic fork Rear: Uni-Trak swingarm
- Brakes: Front Dual discs Rear Single disc
- Tires: Front 120/60 VR17; Rear 160/60 VR17
- Rake, trail: 24°, 85 mm (3.3 in)
- Wheelbase: 1,395 mm (54.9 in)
- Dimensions: L: 1,995–2,035 mm (78.5–80.1 in); W: 700–705 mm (27.6–27.8 in); H: 1,125 mm (44.3 in)
- Seat height: 760–765 mm (29.9–30.1 in)
- Weight: H model 163 kg (359 lb), L model 159 kg (351 lb) (dry)
- Fuel capacity: 16 L (3.5 imp gal; 4.2 US gal)
- Oil capacity: 3.0 L (0.66 imp gal; 0.79 US gal)
- Turning radius: 3.2 m (10 ft)

The Kawasaki Ninja ZXR400 (also known as Ninja ZX-4R) is a sport bike introduced by Kawasaki in 1989. It was one of the most popular of the 400 cubic centimetres (24 cu in) sport bikes that swept across Japan and later Europe in the 1990s.

It was discontinued in 1999 in worldwide markets but unsold models were imported to the United Kingdom until 2003. The H model was produced first, and was superseded by the L series in 1991. The L series had increased power output, but less torque, and updated slimmer rear styling. An earlier model called the ZX-4 was released as a Japan only model from 1987 to 1988.

== Standard Models ==
1989 (H1): Introduction model
1990 (H2): Changes to swingarm, curved radiator replaced the old flat radiator, while the rest of bike remain unchanged.

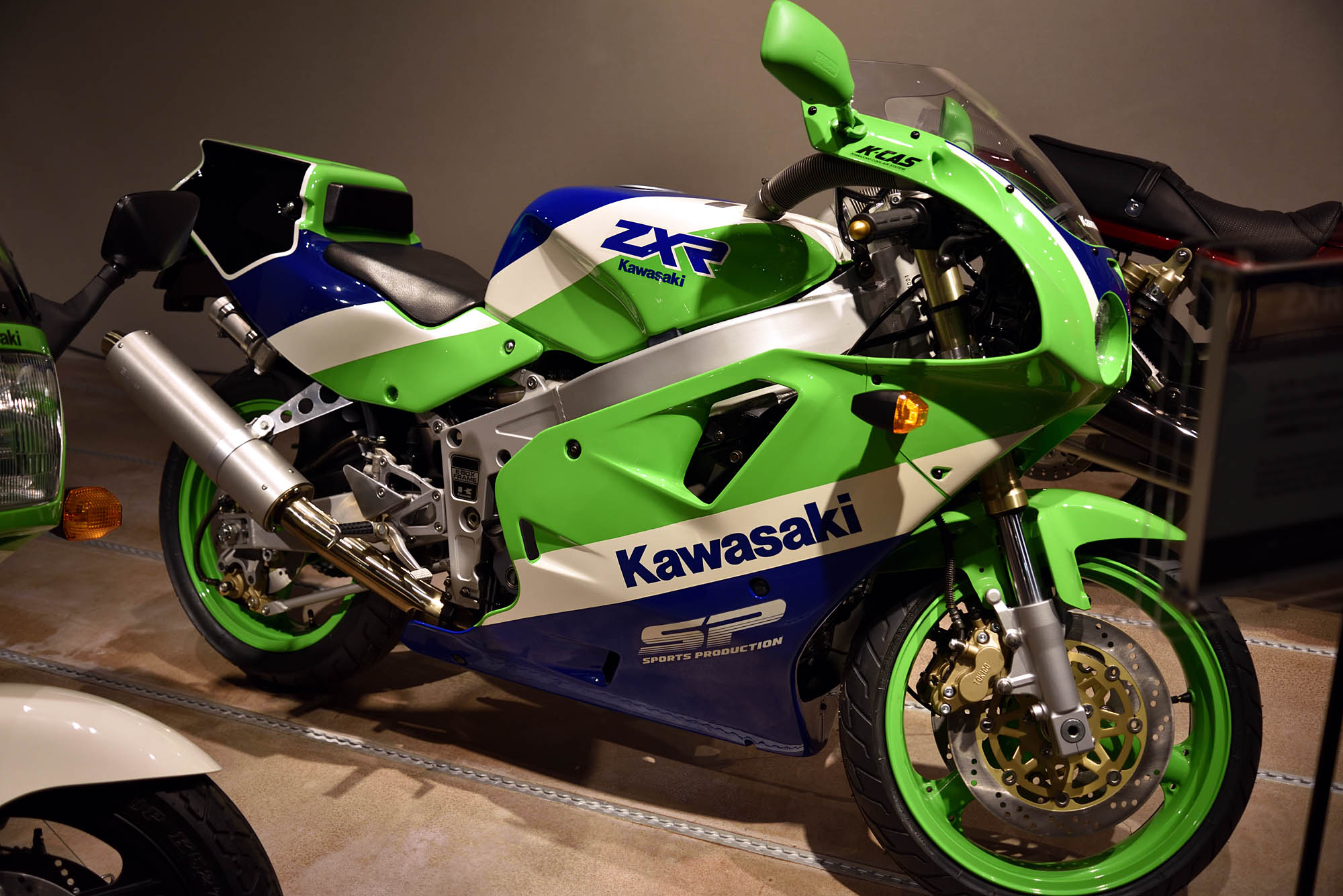
1990 Kawasaki ZXR400R (H2)

1991-1993 (L1-L3): New Frame and Engine Changes. The front fairing was also changed to include a new single headlight unit from the previous models twin round headlights.

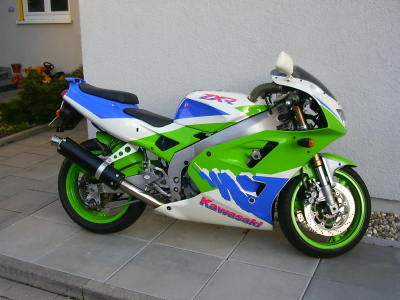
1993 ZXR400 (L3)

1994 (L4): Limited edition ITOHAM Scheme
1995 - 1999 (L5):
1999 (L9): Modified engine internals and suspension

== Homologation Models ==
Both the L and H models were produced in a very limited "Sport Production" series, allowing Kawasaki to homologate a higher specification to make them more competitive in the Formula 3 race series, and were only available in Japan.

The H1 Sport Production model was known as ZX400J1, and the H2 equivalent was ZX400J2.The L model dropped the "Sport Production" decals and instead had "400R" on the number board, and was simply known as ZX400M.These models are identified through the VIN, which begins with the digit 3.

The J and M specification included these additions over and above the standard models : Close ratio gearbox, FCR Flatslide carburettors with TPS, adjustable camshafts, lighter rear subframe combined with single seat unit, front suspension with compression & rebound damping, fully adjustable rear suspension, Mitsubishi CDI with a raised rev limit of 15200rpm.

== See also ==
- Honda CBR400
- Honda RVF400
- Yamaha FZR400
- Suzuki GSX-R400
