= A Cubic Mile of Oil =

Book about the unit of energy

Cubic mile of oil
- Unit of: Energy
- Symbol: CMO

Conversions
1 CMO in ...	... is equal to ...
- SI base units: 1.6×10^{20} kg·m^{2}/s^{2}
- SI units: 1.6×10^{20} joule
- CGS units: 1.6×10^{27} erg
- kilowatt hours: 4.454×10^{13} kWh
- British thermal units: 1.519×10^{17} BTU
- tonnes of LWR fuel at maximum permitted burnup: 2.993×10^{3} 62GWd/THm

A Cubic Mile of Oil is a 2010 book by Hewitt Crane, Edwin Kinderman, and Ripudaman Malhotra. The title refers to a unit of energy intended to provide a visualizable scale for comparing large amounts of energy. Defined as the energy released by burning a cubic mile of oil, a "CMO" is approximately equal to 1.6×10^{20} joule. A cubic mile of oil was approximately the world's yearly consumption of oil at the time of the book and the book examines the possible replacements with other sources. For example, it would require building 32,850 wind turbines or 52 nuclear power plants, each year for 50 years, to obtain in one year the amount of energy contained in one cubic mile of oil. In 2022, Visual Capitalist estimated global consumption of oil translated into a cube 1706 meters on a side (or ~6% longer than 1 mile [1609 meters]).

== See also ==
- Barrel of oil equivalent
- List of countries by energy intensity
- Tonne of oil equivalent – Unit of energy
- Energy density
