= Petronas Fertiliser Kedah =

Factory in Kuala Muda, Malaysia

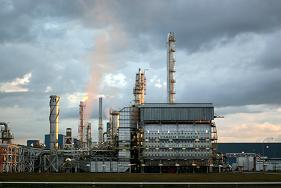
- Kedah factory exterior
- Company type: Privately-held company
- Industry: Agriculture
- Headquarters: Kuala Muda District, Kedah, Malaysia
- Products: Granular urea
- Parent: Petronas

Petronas Chemicals Fertiliser Kedah Sdn Bhd (PCF(K)SB) is a Malaysian urea production company and a wholly owned subsidiary of Petronas, located in Kuala Muda District, Kedah. The company is involved in petrochemical manufacturing, mainly producing granular urea for use in local and foreign agricultural industries.

== Company background ==
As part of the Petrochemical Division of the Malaysian oil giant Petronas, PCF(K)SB's primary product is granular urea, with ammonia and methanol as secondary by-products of the manufacturing process. Currently, the plant has a rated urea output of 2,100 MT per day. PCF(K)SB's urea product is also used in the manufacturing process of additional derivative petrochemicals such as plastics, glue, synthetic fibre, synthetic rubber and lubricants.

Most of PCF(K)SB's products are marketed by MITCO Sdn Bhd, the marketing arm for petrochemicals in Petronas, and is exported through a deep wharf export terminal located in Butterworth, Penang which is connected to the main production plant by railway.
