= Tonne of oil equivalent =

Unit of energy

The tonne of oil equivalent (abbreviated toe) is a unit of energy defined as the amount of energy released by burning one tonne of crude oil. It is approximately 42 gigajoules or 11.630 megawatt-hours, although as different crude oils have different calorific values, the exact value is defined by convention; several slightly different definitions exist. The toe is sometimes used for large amounts of energy.

Multiples of the toe are used, in particular the megatoe (Mtoe, one million toe) and the gigatoe (Gtoe, one billion toe). A smaller unit of kilogram of oil equivalent (kgoe or koe) is also sometimes used denoting 1/1000 toe.

A related concept is the physical quantity oil-equivalent mass (or mass of oil equivalent), expressed in the ordinary units of mass and its multiples: kilogram (kg), megagram (Mg) or tonne (t), etc.

== Definitions ==
The International Energy Agency defines one tonne of oil equivalent (toe) to be equal to:

- 1 toe = 11.63 megawatt-hours (MWh)
- 1 toe = 41.868 gigajoules (GJ)
- 1 toe = 10 gigacalories (Gcal) – using the international steam table calorie (cal_{IT}) and not the thermochemical calorie (cal_{th})
- 1 toe = 39,683,207.2 British thermal units (BTU)
- 1 toe = 1.42857143 tonnes of coal equivalent (tce)

Conversion into other units:

- 1 toe = 7.33 barrels of oil equivalent (boe)

Some other sources and publications use divergent definitions of toe, for example:

- 1 toe = 10.7 gigacalories (Gcal) – using the thermochemical calorie
- 1 toe = 41.85 gigajoules (GJ)
- 1 toe = 44.769 gigajoules (GJ) – based on using thermochemical calorie (cal_{th})
- 1 toe = 39,683,205.411 British thermal units (BTU)

== Conversion factors ==
- 1 barrel of oil equivalent (boe) contains approximately 0.136 toe (i.e. there are approximately 7.33 boe in a toe).
- 1 t diesel = 1.01 toe
- 1 m^{3} diesel = 0.98 toe
- 1 t petrol = 1.05 toe
- 1 m^{3} petrol = 0.86 toe
- 1 t biodiesel = 0.86 toe
- 1 m^{3} biodiesel = 0.78 toe
- 1 t bioethanol = 0.64 toe
- 1 m^{3} bioethanol = 0.51 toe
- 1 MWh = 0.086 toe (therefore 1 toe = 11630.0 kWh)
- At thermal power plants, 1 MWh is generated with 0.22 toe fuel or 0.39 MWh with 0.086 toe (39% thermal to electrical conversion efficiency)

Tonne of oil equivalent should be used carefully when converting electrical units. For instance, BP's 2022 report used a factor of 40% efficiency (the average efficiency of a standard thermal power plant in 2017), or roughly 16.8 GJ per toe, when converting kilowatt-hours to toe. BP's model is also based on the assumption that efficiency will increase linearly to 45% by 2050.

== Derived units ==
For multiples of the tonne of oil equivalent, it is more usual to speak of millions of tonnes of oil equivalent and kilotonnes of oil equivalent (ktoe).

Multiple	Name	Symbol
10^{3}	kilotonne of oil equivalent	ktoe
10^{6}	megatonne of oil equivalent	Mtoe

== See also ==
- A Cubic Mile of Oil – Book about the unit of energy
- Barrel of oil equivalent – Unit of energy
- Conversion of units – Comparison of various scales
- Energy density – Energy per volume
- TNT equivalent – Class of units of measurement for explosive energy a unit of energy almost exactly 0.1 tonnes of oil equivalent
