= Petronas FP1 =

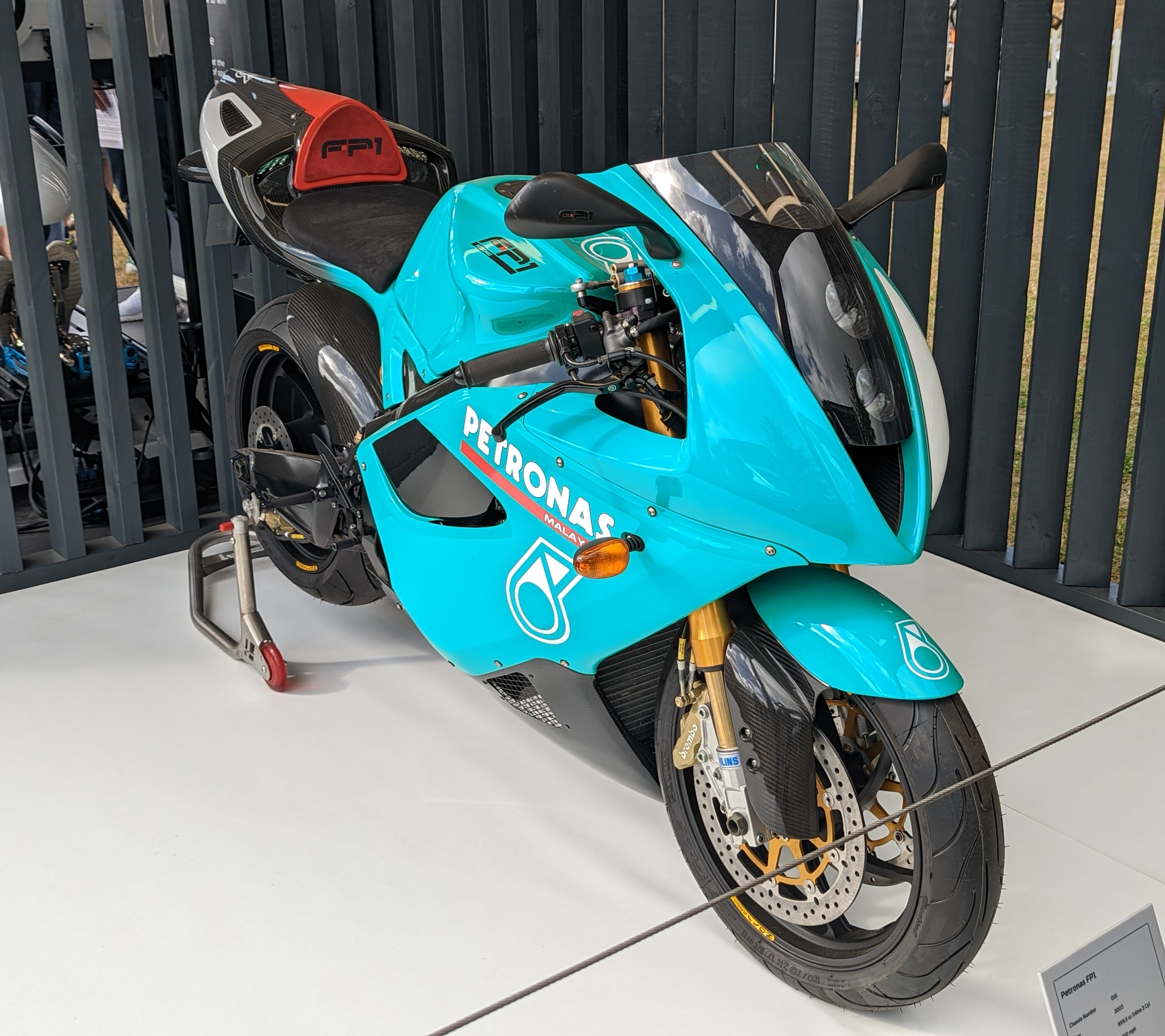
- Manufacturer: Petronas
- Production: January 2003 - July 2003
- Class: super bike
- Engine: 899.5 cc (54.89 cu in), liquid-cooled, 3 - cylinders in line, 4-stroke, DOHC, 4 valves per cylinder
- Bore / stroke: 88.0 mm × 49.3 mm (3.5 in × 1.9 in)
- Power: 127.4 hp (95.0 kW) @ 10000 rpm
- Torque: 92 N⋅m (67.9 lb⋅ft) @ 9700 rpm
- Transmission: 6-speed
- Suspension: Front: Öhlins upside-down fork, 43 mm, Inverted design. Multi adjustable: compression, rebound, spring, 110 mm travel Rear: Monoshock low linkage, Aero Twin Spar Black finish swingarm. öhlins Shock, adjustable compression and rebound damping, preload adjuster. Stroke: 52 mm, 120 mm travel
- Brakes: Front: dual 320 mm floating discs with 4-piston calipers Rear: single 220 mm disc with 2-piston calipers
- Tires: Front: 120/70-17; Back: 190/50-17
- Rake, trail: 24.4 degrees / 105.4 mm (4.15 in)
- Wheelbase: 1,420 mm (56 in)
- Dimensions: L: 2,050 mm (81 in); W: 680 mm (27 in); H: 1,135 mm (44.7 in)
- Weight: 181 kg (399 lb) (dry)
- Fuel capacity: 18 L (4.0 imp gal; 4.8 US gal)

The Petronas FP1 is a 899.5 cc (54.89 cu in) liquid cooled inline three-cylinder homologation special sport bike that was produced in 2003 by Petronas.

== History ==
Originally developed jointly by Petronas and Sauber Petronas Engineering as the Petronas GP1 989cc prototype to compete in MotoGP, Petronas decided to race the motorcycle in the Superbike World Championship instead. To meet the requirements for the motorcycle's entry into the championship, the engine was reduced to 899.5 cc (54.89 cu in) and Petronas had to produce 150 road version motorcycles for FIM homologation.

The first 75 units of Petronas FP1s were built in the United Kingdom by January 30 2003, passing homologation inspection to enable the bike to contest in 2003. The final 75 units were assembled in Malaysia by the country's motorcycle manufacturer, Modenas by July 2003.

Out of the 150 units produced only 100 were made available to the public available in Panache Green, Exotic Black and Misty Grey. The other 50 units were kept to be used for racing.

Petronas joined forces with four-time Superbike World champion Carl Fogarty to form a racing team — Foggy Petronas Racing, with riders Troy Corser and James Haydon — to participate in the Superbike World Championship.

From 2003 the FIM changed the rules to allow 1000 cc machines (either twins, triples or four-cylinder) to race. The FP1 was developed under the previous regulations (that limited the engine displacement for 3-cylinder to 900cc), as a result the motorcycle was at a disadvantage from the rest of the field.

With the Japanese manufacturers limiting their involvement for 2003 and 2004, the FP1 was able to have some good results, finishing on the podium twice in 2004. With Japanese motorcycles returning in 2005 the FP1 fell behind and by 2006 it was struggling to finish in the points. Petronas terminated the superbike project at the end of 2006.

In 2010, Motor Cycle News discovered 60 brand new FP1's stored in Basildon, Essex. Manufactured for Petronas by MSX International for homologation purposes, they were part of the original batch of 75, but which were never shipped to Malaysia. The bikes are presently held in the former MSX premises by new company owner Arrk R&D, who are subject to a confidentiality agreement to Petronas.
