= Thermie =

Unit of energy

A thermie (th) is a non-SI metric unit of heat energy, part of the metre-tonne-second system sometimes used by European engineers. The thermie is equal to the amount of energy required to raise the temperature of 1 tonne (1,000 kg) of water at 14.5 °C at standard atmospheric pressure by 1 °C. The thermie is equivalent to 1000 kcal, 4.1868 MJ or 3968.3 BTU.
