= Companies Act 1965 =

Parliament of Malaysia
- Long title: An Act relating to companies.
- Citation: Act 125
- Territorial extent: Throughout Malaysia
- Passed by: Dewan Rakyat
- Passed: 9 August 1965
- Enacted: 1965 (Act No. 79 of 1965); Revised: 1973 (Act 125 w.e.f. 14 December 1973)
- Passed by: Dewan Negara
- Passed: 16 August 1965
- Effective: [Throughout Malaysia—15 April 1966, P.U. 168/1966]
- Repealed: 31 January 2017

Legislative history

Initiating chamber: Dewan Rakyat
- Bill title: Companies Bill 1965
- Introduced by: Lim Swee Aun, Minister of Commerce and Industry
- First reading: 26 May 1965
- Second reading: 9 August 1965
- Third reading: 9 August 1965

Revising chamber: Dewan Negara
- Bill title: Companies Bill 1965
- Member(s) in charge: Lim Swee Aun, Minister of Commerce and Industry
- First reading: 16 August 1965
- Second reading: 16 August 1965
- Third reading: 16 August 1965

Amended by
- Companies (Amendment) Act 1966 [Act 23/1966] Companies (Amendment) Act 1969 [Act A21] Borrowing Companies Act 1969 [Act 6] Emergency (Essential Powers) Ordinance No. 27, 1970 [P.U. (A) 102/1970] Companies (Amendment) Act 1971 [Act A50] Banking Act 1973 [Act 102] Revision of Laws (Companies Act) Order 1975 [P.U. (A) 15/1975] Malaysian Currency (Ringgit) Act 1975 [Act 160] Subordinate Courts Act (Extension) Order 1980 [P.U. (A) 357/1980] Islamic Banking Act 1983 [Act 276] Companies (Amendment) Act 1985 [Act A616] Companies (Amendment of Schedules) Order 1986 [P.U. (A) 15/1986] Companies (Amendment of Schedules) (No.2) Order 1986 [P.U. (A) 476/1986] Companies (Amendment) Act 1986 [Act A657] Subordinate Courts (Amendment) Act 1987 [Act A671] Companies (Amendment of Schedule) Order 1988 [P.U. (A) 14/1988] Companies (Amendment) Act 1989 [Act A720] Banking and Financial Institutions Act 1989 [Act 372] Companies (Amendment) Act 1991 [Act A791] Companies (Amendment) Act 1992 [Act A816] Companies (Amendment) (No.2) Act 1992 [Act A836] Companies (Amendment) Act 1993 [Act A845] Securities Commission Act 1993 [Act 498] Companies (Amendment of Schedules) Order 1993 [P.U. (A) 79/1993] Companies (Amendment) Act 1996 [Act A949] Insurance Act 1996 [Act 553] Companies (Amendment) Act 1997 [Act A1007] Companies (Amendment) Act 1998 [Act A1022] Companies (Amendment) (No.2) Act 1998 [Act A1043] Companies (Amendment of Schedule) Order 2000 [P.U. (A) 236/2000] Companies (Amendment) Act 2000 [Act A1081] Companies (Amendment) Act 2001 [Act A1108] Companies (Amendment of Schedule) Order 2001 [P.U.(A) 371/2001] Companies (Amendment) Act (No.2) 2001 [Act A1118] Bankruptcy (Amendment) Act 2003 [Act A1197] Companies (Amendment) Act 2007 [Act A1299]

Repealed by
- Companies Act 2016 [Act 777]
- Status: Repealed

The Companies Act 1965 (Malay: Akta Syarikat 1965), was a Malaysian law which relates to companies.

== Structure ==
The Companies Act 1965, in its current form (15 August 2007), consists of 12 Parts containing 374 sections and 10 schedules (including 36 amendments).

- Part I: Preliminary
- Part II: Administration of Act
- Part III: Constitution of Companies
  - Division 1: Incorporation
  - Division 2: Powers
- Part IV: Shares, Debentures and Charges
  - Division 1: Prospectuses
  - Division 2: Restrictions on Allotment and Commencement of Business
  - Division 3: Shares
  - Division 3A: Substantial Shareholdings
  - Division 4: Debentures
  - Division 5: Interests other than Shares, Debentures, etc.
  - Division 6: Title and Transfers
  - Division 6A: Provisions Applicable to Companies whose Securities are Deposited with the Central Depository
  - Division 7: Registration of Charges
- Part V: Management and Administration
  - Division 1: Office and Name
  - Division 2: Directors and Officers
  - Division 3: Meetings and Proceedings
  - Division 4: Register of Members
  - Division 5: Annual Return
- Part VI: Accounts and Audit
  - Division 1: Accounts
  - Division 2: Audit
- Part VII: Arrangement and Reconstructions
- Part VIII: Receivers and Managers
- Part IX: Investigations
- Part X: Winding up
  - Division 1: Preliminary
  - Division 2: Winding up by the Court
    - Subdivision 1: General
    - Subdivision 2: Liquidators
    - Subdivision 3: Committees of Inspection
    - Subdivision 4: General Powers of Court
  - Division 3: Voluntary Winding up
    - Subdivision 1: Introductory
    - Subdivision 2: Provisions applicable only to Members' Voluntary Winding up
    - Subdivision 3: Provisions applicable only to Creditors' Voluntary Winding up
    - Subdivision 4: Provisions applicable to every Voluntary Winding up
  - Division 4: Provisions Applicable to Every Mode of Winding up
    - Subdivision 1: General
    - Subdivision 2: Proof and Ranking of Claims
    - Subdivision 3: Effect on other Transactions
    - Subdivision 4: Offences
    - Subdivision 5: Dissolution
  - Division 5: Winding up of Unregistered Companies
- Part XI: Various Types of Companies, etc.
  - Division 1: Investment Companies
  - Division 2: Foreign Companies
- Part XII: General
  - Division 1: Enforcement of Act
  - Division 2: Offences
  - Division 3: Miscellaneous
- Schedules

== See also ==
- Companies Act
