= Barrel of oil equivalent =

Unit of energy

The barrel of oil equivalent (BOE) is a unit of energy based on the approximate energy released by burning one barrel (42 US gallons, 35 imp gal or about 159 litres) of crude oil. The BOE is used by oil and gas companies in their financial statements as a way of combining oil and natural gas reserves and production into a single measure, although this energy equivalence does not take into account the lower financial value of energy in the form of gas.

The U.S. Energy Information Administration defines the barrel of oil equivalent as about 6 gigajoules (1.7 megawatt-hours; 5.7 million British thermal units). The value is necessarily approximate as various grades of oil and gas have slightly different heating values. If one considers the lower heating value instead of the higher heating value, the value for one BOE would be approximately 5.4 GJ (see tonne of oil equivalent). Typically 5,800 cubic feet of natural gas is equivalent to one BOE. The United States Geological Survey gives a figure of 6,000 cubic feet (170 cubic metres) of typical natural gas.

Due to the risk of confusion, the Society of Petroleum Engineers recommends in their style guide that abbreviations or prefixes M or MM are not used for barrels of oil or barrel of oil equivalent, but rather that thousands, millions or billions are spelled out. Common prefixes for readers familiar with the metric system are k for thousand, M for million and G for billion while other readers might be more familiar with M for thousand, MM for million and B for billion. All those multiples are commonly combined with barrel of oil equivalent from the level of individual production units output per day to level of petroleum reserves.

Metric regions commonly use the tonne of oil equivalent (toe), or more often million toe (Mtoe). Since this is a measurement of mass, any conversion to barrels of oil equivalent depends on the density of the oil in question, as well as the energy content. Typically 1 tonne of oil has a volume of 1.08 to 1.19 cubic metres (6.8 to 7.5 bbl). The United States EIA suggests 1 toe has an average energy value of 39.68 million British thermal units (41.9 GJ).

== See also ==
- Conversion of units § Energy
- A Cubic Mile of Oil – Book about the unit of energy
- Energy density – Energy per volume
- Heat of combustion – Amount of heat released by combustion of a quantity of substance
- Miles per gallon gasoline equivalent – Measurement of fuel economy
- Therm – Unit of energy
