= Units of energy =

Units used to measure energy

Energy is defined via work, so the SI unit of energy is the same as the unit of work – the joule (J), named in honour of James Prescott Joule and his experiments on the mechanical equivalent of heat. In slightly more fundamental terms, 1 joule is equal to 1 newton metre and, in terms of SI base units

$$1\ \mathrm{J} = 1\ \mathrm{kg} \left( \frac{\mathrm{m}}{\mathrm{s}} \right ) ^ 2 = 1\ \frac{\mathrm{kg} \cdot \mathrm{m}^2}{\mathrm{s}^2}$$

An energy unit that is used in atomic physics, particle physics, and high energy physics is the electronvolt (eV). One eV is equivalent to 1.602176634×10^{−19} J.

In spectroscopy, the unit cm^{−1} ≈ 0.0001239842 eV is used to represent energy since energy is inversely proportional to wavelength from the equation $E = h \nu = h c/\lambda$.

In discussions of energy production and consumption, the units barrel of oil equivalent and ton of oil equivalent are often used.

== British imperial units / US customary units ==
The British imperial units and U.S. customary units for both energy and work include the foot-pound force (1.3558 J), the British thermal unit (BTU) which has various values in the region of 1055 J, the horsepower-hour (2.6845 MJ), and the gasoline gallon equivalent (about 120 MJ).

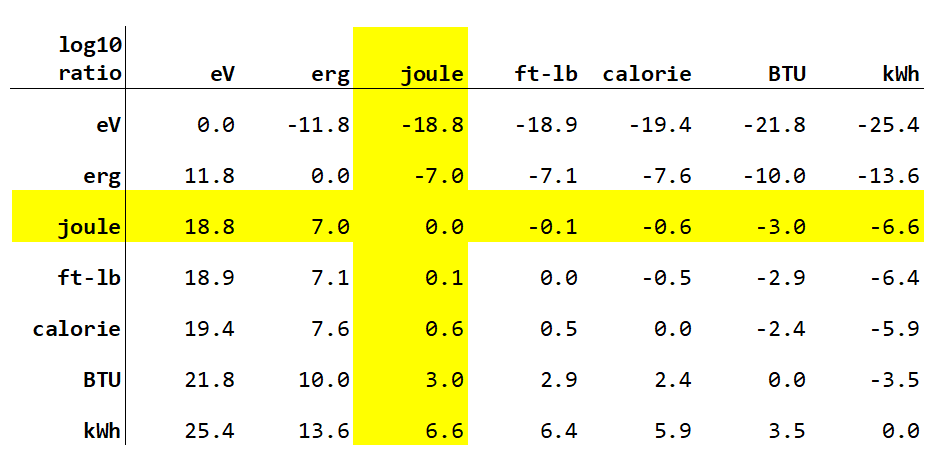
Log-base-10 of the ratios between various measures of energy

The table illustrates the wide range of magnitudes among conventional units of energy. For example, 1 BTU is equivalent to about 1,000 joules, and there are 25 orders-of-magnitude difference between a kilowatt-hour and an electron-volt.

== Electricity ==
A unit of electrical energy, particularly for utility bills, is the kilowatt-hour (kWh); one kilowatt-hour is equal to 3.6 megajoules. Electricity usage is often given in units of kilowatt-hours per year or other periods. This is a measurement of average power consumption, meaning the average rate at which energy is transferred. One kilowatt-hour per year is around 0.11 watts.

== Natural gas ==
Natural gas is often sold in units of energy content or by volume. Common units for selling by energy content are joules or therms. One therm is equal to about 105.5 megajoules. Common units for selling by volume are cubic metre or cubic feet. Natural gas in the US is sold in therms or 100 cubic feet (100 ft^{3}). In Australia, natural gas is sold in cubic metres. One cubic metre contains about 38 megajoules. In most of the world, natural gas is sold in gigajoules.

== Food industry ==
The calorie is defined as the amount of thermal energy necessary to raise the temperature of one gram of water by 1 Celsius degree, from a temperature of 14.5 °C, at a pressure of 1 atm. For thermochemistry a calorie of 4.184 J is used, but other calories have also been defined, such as the International Steam Table calorie of 4.1868 J. In many regions, food energy is measured in large calories (a large calory is a kilocalorie, equal to 1000 calories), sometimes written capitalized as Calories. In the European Union, food energy labelling in joules is mandatory, often with calories as supplementary information.

== Atom physics and chemistry ==
In physics and chemistry, it is common to measure energy on the atomic scale in the non-SI, but convenient, units electron volts (eV). One electron volt (1 eV) is equivalent to the kinetic energy acquired by an electron in passing through a potential difference of 1 volt in a vacuum. It is common to use the SI magnitude prefixes (e.g. milli-, mega- etc) with electron volts. Because of the relativistic equivalence between mass and energy, the eV is also sometimes used as a unit of mass. In particle physics particularly, it is common to work in natural units, $c = \hbar = 1$ (where $\hbar = h/2\pi$ is the reduced Planck constant). In this scheme, energy has the same units as momentum, mass, and inverse length, all of which are measured in eV. The Hartree (the atomic unit of energy) is commonly used in the field of computational chemistry since such units arise directly from the calculation algorithms without any need for conversion. Historically, Rydberg units have been used.

== Spectroscopy ==
In spectroscopy and related fields it is common to measure energy levels in units of reciprocal centimetres. These units (cm^{−1}) are strictly speaking not energy units but units proportional to energies, with $\ hc\sim 2\cdot 10^{-23}\ \mathrm{J}\ \mathrm{cm}$ being the proportionality constant.

== Explosions ==
A gram of TNT releases 4,100 to 4,600 joules (980 to 1,100 calories) upon explosion. To define the tonne of TNT, this was standardized to 1 kilocalorie (4,184 joules), giving a value of 4.184 gigajoules (1 billion calories) for the tonne of TNT.

== See also ==
- Energy consumption
- Erg (small unit of energy)
- Conversion of units of temperature
- Conversion of units of energy, work, or amount of heat
- Foe (large unit of energy)
- Kayser (unit of wavenumber)
- List of unusual units of measurement
- Maximum demand indicator
- Orders of magnitude (energy)
