= 2006 FIM Superstock 1000 Cup =

2006 FIM Superstock 1000 Cup
Previous:	2005	Next:	2007
Support series: Superbike World Championship; Supersport World Championship; European Superstock 600 Championship

The 2006 FIM Superstock 1000 Cup was the eighth edition of the FIM Superstock 1000 Cup, the second held under this name. It was run over ten rounds, starting on 23 April in Valencia, Spain, and ending on 8 October in Magny-Cours, France.

The riders' championship was won by Alessandro Polita on a Suzuki GSX-R1000 K6 entered by Celani Suzuki Italia. His main rivals throughout the season were Claudio Corti aboard a Yamaha Team Italia's R1 and two MV Agusta riders, Luca Scassa and Ayrton Badovini. These four Italian riders scored all the pole positions except for the Valencia round and all the race victories.

The manufacturers' championship was won by Suzuki, while the season also saw the first victory for MV Agusta at world level since the 1976 German motorcycle Grand Prix.

== Race calendar and results ==
Round	Date	Round	Circuit	Pole position	Fastest lap	Race winner	Winning team
1	23 April	Spain	Circuit Ricardo Tormo	(Spain) Iván Silva	(Italy) Alessandro Polita	(Italy) Alessandro Polita	Celani Suzuki Italia
2	7 May	Italy	Autodromo Nazionale Monza	(Italy) Alessandro Polita	(Italy) Alessandro Polita	(Italy) Alessandro Polita	Celani Suzuki Italia
3	28 May	Europe	Silverstone Circuit	(Italy) Claudio Corti	(Italy) Claudio Corti	(Italy) Claudio Corti	Yamaha Team Italia
4	25 June	San Marino	Misano Circuit	(Italy) Ayrton Badovini	(Italy) Alessandro Polita	(Italy) Alessandro Polita	Celani Suzuki Italia
5	23 July	Czech Republic	Brno Circuit	(Italy) Luca Scassa	(Italy) Ayrton Badovini	(Italy) Ayrton Badovini	Biassono - Unionbike
6	6 August	(United Kingdom) Great Britain	Brands Hatch	(Italy) Ayrton Badovini	(Italy) Ayrton Badovini	(Italy) Luca Scassa	EVR Corse Ormeni Racing
7	3 September	Netherlands	TT Circuit Assen	(Italy) Ayrton Badovini	(Italy) Luca Scassa	(Italy) Claudio Corti	Yamaha Team Italia
8	10 September	Germany	Lausitzring	(Italy) Claudio Corti	(Italy) Claudio Corti	(Italy) Claudio Corti	Yamaha Team Italia
9	1 October	Italy	Autodromo Enzo e Dino Ferrari	(Italy) Luca Scassa	(Italy) Luca Scassa	(Italy) Luca Scassa	EVR Corse Ormeni Racing
10	8 October	France	Circuit de Nevers Magny-Cours	(Italy) Claudio Corti	(Italy) Claudio Corti	(Italy) Claudio Corti	Yamaha Team Italia

== Entry list ==
Team	Constructor	Motorcycle	No.	Rider	Rounds
Azione Corse	Honda	Honda CBR1000RR	14	(Italy) Mauro Belliero	1–8
Azione Corse	Honda	Honda CBR1000RR	40	(France) Hervé Gantner	7–10
Azione Corse	Honda	Honda CBR1000RR	76	(United Kingdom) Adam Jenkinson	10
Azione Corse	Honda	Honda CBR1000RR	82	(Italy) Giuseppe Cedroni	1–6
Azione Corse	Honda	Honda CBR1000RR	121	(Italy) William Marconi	9
Azione Corse	Honda	Honda CBR1000RR	154	(Italy) Tommaso Lorenzetti	4–5
MS Racing	Honda	Honda CBR1000RR	47	(United Kingdom) Richard Cooper	All
MS Racing	Honda	Honda CBR1000RR	96	(Czech Republic) Matěj Smrž	All
Berry Racing Team	Kawasaki	Kawasaki ZX 10R	5	(Italy) Riccardo Chiarello	7–10
D'Antin MotoGP	Kawasaki	Kawasaki ZX 10R	36	(Spain) Iván Silva	1
D'Antin MotoGP	Kawasaki	Kawasaki ZX 10R	95	(Qatar) Mashel Al Naimi	1, 6, 9
JJR Ridenow Kawasaki	Kawasaki	Kawasaki ZX 10R	22	(United Kingdom) Guy Sanders	3
Lightspeed Kawasaki Supported	Kawasaki	Kawasaki ZX 10R	5	(Italy) Riccardo Chiarello	1–5
Lightspeed Kawasaki Supported	Kawasaki	Kawasaki ZX 10R	10	(Italy) Giuseppe Natalini	9–10
Lightspeed Kawasaki Supported	Kawasaki	Kawasaki ZX 10R	20	(Italy) Fabrizio Perotti	7–8
Lightspeed Kawasaki Supported	Kawasaki	Kawasaki ZX 10R	22	(United Kingdom) Guy Sanders	6
PMS Corse	Kawasaki	Kawasaki ZX 10R	36	(Spain) Iván Silva	6
PMS Corse	Kawasaki	Kawasaki ZX 10R	38	(Italy) Gilles Boccolini	5–10
PMS Corse	Kawasaki	Kawasaki ZX 10R	42	(Spain) Alex Martinez	1–4
PMS Corse	Kawasaki	Kawasaki ZX 10R	73	(Italy) Simone Saltarelli	1–5
PSG–1 Kawasaki Course	Kawasaki	Kawasaki ZX 10R	11	(Italy) Denis Sacchetti	1–7
PSG–1 Kawasaki Course	Kawasaki	Kawasaki ZX 10R	27	(Italy) Alessandro Colatosti	8–10
Szkopek Racing	Kawasaki	Kawasaki ZX 10R	84	(Poland) Marek Szkopek	9
Biassono Racing Team; Biassono – Unionbike	MV Agusta	MV Agusta F4 1000 R	86	(Italy) Ayrton Badovini	All
EVR Corse Ormeni Racing	MV Agusta	MV Agusta F4 1000 R	9	(Italy) Luca Scassa	All
EVR Corse Ormeni Racing	MV Agusta	MV Agusta F4 1000 R	12	(Germany) Leonardo Biliotti	All
Unionbike GiMotosports	MV Agusta	MV Agusta F4 1000 R	31	(Italy) Giuseppe Barone	1–2
Unionbike GiMotosports	MV Agusta	MV Agusta F4 1000 R	45	(Italy) Gianluca Rapicavoli	1–4
Unionbike GiMotosports	MV Agusta	MV Agusta F4 1000 R	57	(Italy) Ilario Dionisi	5–10
Hoegee Suzuki Racing	Suzuki	Suzuki GSX-R750 K6	49	(Netherlands) Jarno Van Der Marel	7
Beowulf Motorsport.com; Beowulf Racing	Suzuki	Suzuki GSX-R1000 K6	33	(United Kingdom) Patrick McDougall	6–10
Beowulf Motorsport.com; Beowulf Racing	Suzuki	Suzuki GSX-R1000 K6	41	(Australia) Nick Henderson	1–5
Betandwin.de Racing	Suzuki	Suzuki GSX-R1000 K6	51	(Germany) Dominik Lammert	8
Celani Suzuki Italia	Suzuki	Suzuki GSX-R1000 K6	8	(France) Loïc Napoleone	All
Celani Suzuki Italia	Suzuki	Suzuki GSX-R1000 K6	53	(Italy) Alessandro Polita	All
EMS Racing	Suzuki	Suzuki GSX-R1000 K6	32	(South Africa) Sheridan Morais	All
EMS Racing	Suzuki	Suzuki GSX-R1000 K6	34	(Republic of Ireland) Mark Pollock	All
ERT Team	Suzuki	Suzuki GSX-R1000 K6	56	(France) Emeric Jonchiere	10
HP Racing	Suzuki	Suzuki GSX-R1000 K6	13	(Italy) Andrea Paoloni	2–3
HP Racing	Suzuki	Suzuki GSX-R1000 K6	26	(Australia) Brendan Roberts	4, 6–10
HP Racing	Suzuki	Suzuki GSX-R1000 K6	42	(Spain) Alex Martinez	5
MD Team Jerman	Suzuki	Suzuki GSX-R1000 K6	24	(Slovenia) Marko Jerman	All
Oliveira Suzuki	Suzuki	Suzuki GSX-R1000 K6	35	(Netherlands) Allard Kerkhoven	All
Oliveira Suzuki	Suzuki	Suzuki GSX-R1000 K6	41	(Australia) Nick Henderson	6
Piet Geluk Racing	Suzuki	Suzuki GSX-R1000 K6	21	(Netherlands) Leon Bovee	All
Racing Dirk Van Mol	Suzuki	Suzuki GSX-R1000 K6	28	(Belgium) Sepp Vermonden	1–5
Racing Dirk Van Mol	Suzuki	Suzuki GSX-R1000 K6	64	(Belgium) Didier Heyndrickx	6–8
Racing Dirk Van Mol	Suzuki	Suzuki GSX-R1000 K6	75	(Germany) Arne Tode	9–10
SBP	Suzuki	Suzuki GSX-R1000 K6	19	(Italy) Gabriele Perri	2
SRC Racing	Suzuki	Suzuki GSX-R1000 K6	18	(Belgium) Eric Van Bael	All
Suzuki Grandys Duo Racing	Suzuki	Suzuki GSX-R1000 K6	43	(Poland) Bartłomiej Wiczynski	5
TCM Gi.Motor	Suzuki	Suzuki GSX-R1000 K6	31	(Italy) Giuseppe Barone	3, 5–10
T.C.M. Team Cruciani Moto	Suzuki	Suzuki GSX-R1000 K6	99	(Italy) Danilo Dell'Omo	All
TKR Suzuki Switzerland	Suzuki	Suzuki GSX-R1000 K6	69	(France) David Fouloy	1–4
TKR Suzuki Switzerland	Suzuki	Suzuki GSX-R1000 K6	89	(Switzerland) Raphael Chevre	5–10
Yohann Moto Sport	Suzuki	Suzuki GSX-R1000 K6	17	(France) Cédric Tangre	1–8
Yohann Moto Sport	Suzuki	Suzuki GSX-R1000 K6	72	(France) Freddy Foray	9–10
44 Racing Team	Yamaha	Yamaha YZF-R1	44	(Italy) Roberto Lunadei	All
Alapont Competition	Yamaha	Yamaha YZF-R1	37	(Spain) Javier Oliver	1
Autophone Racing	Yamaha	Yamaha YZF-R1	55	(Belgium) Olivier Depoorter	All
Dos Santos Racing	Yamaha	Yamaha YZF-R1	54	(France) Anthony Dos Santos	10
Kristal Racing	Yamaha	Yamaha YZF-R1	23	(United Kingdom) Howie Manwaring	3
NVIDIA	Yamaha	Yamaha YZF-R1	48	(United Kingdom) Jon Boy Lee	6
PMS Racing	Yamaha	Yamaha YZF-R1	58	(Italy) Robert Gianfardoni	7–10
Puccetti Racing	Yamaha	Yamaha YZF-R1	39	(Italy) Mattia Angeloni	4
RG Team	Yamaha	Yamaha YZF-R1	16	(Spain) Enrique Rocamora	All
RT Motorsport	Yamaha	Yamaha YZF-R1	50	(Australia) David Johnson	7
Solli Racing	Yamaha	Yamaha YZF-R1	71	(Norway) Petter Solli	All
Team Trasimeno	Yamaha	Yamaha YZF-R1	10	(Italy) Giuseppe Natalini	1–6
Team Trasimeno	Yamaha	Yamaha YZF-R1	57	(Italy) Ilario Dionisi	1–3
Team Trasimeno	Yamaha	Yamaha YZF-R1	73	(Italy) Simone Saltarelli	7–10
Team Trasimeno	Yamaha	Yamaha YZF-R1	90	(Italy) Diego Ciavattini	4–10
Ticino Hosting Badan Team	Yamaha	Yamaha YZF-R1	40	(Switzerland) Hervé Gantner	1–2, 4
Umbria Bike	Yamaha	Yamaha YZF-R1	15	(Italy) Matteo Baiocco	All
Yamaha Team Italia	Yamaha	Yamaha YZF-R1	77	(Italy) Claudio Corti	All

Key
Regular rider
Wildcard rider
Replacement rider

- All entries used Pirelli tyres.

== Championship standings ==
=== Riders' championship ===
Pos.	Rider	Bike	ESP (Spain)	ITA (Italy)	EUR (Europe)	SMR (San Marino)	CZE (Czech Republic)	GBR (United Kingdom)	NED (Netherlands)	GER (Germany)	ITA (Italy)	FRA (France)	Pts
1	(Italy) Alessandro Polita	Suzuki	1	**1**	2	1	Ret	2	3	10	3	2	173
2	(Italy) Claudio Corti	Yamaha	8	10	**1**	5	14	4	1	**1**	4	**1**	153
3	(Italy) Luca Scassa	MV Agusta	5	5	4	3	**2**	1	5	5	**1**	Ret	143
4	(Italy) Ayrton Badovini	MV Agusta	3	3	3	**2**	1	**3**	**Ret**	Ret	5	Ret	120
5	(Italy) Matteo Baiocco	Yamaha	11	9	9	12	4	14	4	7	6	3	86
6	(Australia) Brendan Roberts	Suzuki				4		7	2	2	2	Ret	82
7	(Spain) Enrique Rocamora	Yamaha	4	11	5	6	10	6	6	13	13	10	77
8	(Italy) Riccardo Chiarello	Kawasaki	14	2	11	10	6		12	15	Ret	7	57
9	(France) Loïc Napoleone	Suzuki	Ret	12	10	Ret	8	10	8	3	7	DNS	57
10	(Italy) Denis Sacchetti	Kawasaki	6	7	8	Ret	9	5	Ret				45
11	(United Kingdom) Richard Cooper	Honda	12	16	13	9	3	12	13	9	19	DNS	44
12	(Italy) Danilo Dell'Omo	Suzuki	13	6	Ret	15	7	26	14	8	9	13	43
13	(Italy) Ilario Dionisi	Yamaha	15	8	6								42
13	(Italy) Ilario Dionisi	MV Agusta					16	13	9	DNS	20	4	42
14	(South Africa) Sheridan Morais	Suzuki	7	Ret	7	Ret	13	8	11	16	16	11	39
15	(Spain) Álex Martínez	Kawasaki	9	4	12	11							30
15	(Spain) Álex Martínez	Suzuki					15						30
16	(Spain) Iván Silva	Kawasaki	**2**					9					27
17	(Slovenia) Marko Jerman	Suzuki	19	14	21	14	12	20	16	11	12	9	24
18	(Italy) Roberto Lunadei	Yamaha	18	Ret	17	Ret	Ret	Ret	21	6	8	DNS	18
19	(Italy) Simone Saltarelli	Kawasaki	10	13	16	7	Ret						18
19	(Italy) Simone Saltarelli	Yamaha							17	19	Ret	18	18
20	(Italy) Leonardo Biliotti	MV Agusta	20	18	Ret	20	5	24	Ret	20	10	Ret	17
21	(Italy) Gilles Boccolini	Kawasaki					Ret	18	7	14	11	Ret	16
22	(Germany) Dominic Lammert	Suzuki								4			13
23	(Switzerland) Hervé Gantner	Yamaha	Ret	21		WD							13
23	(Switzerland) Hervé Gantner	Honda							15	12	22	8	13
24	(Czech Republic) Matěj Smrž	Honda	Ret	17	14	8	Ret	DNS	Ret	Ret	14	Ret	12
25	(France) Emeric Jonchière	Suzuki										5	11
26	(Germany) Arne Tode	Suzuki									15	6	11
27	(France) Cédric Tangre	Suzuki	17	20	15	13	11	16	Ret	WD			9
28	(Australia) David Johnson	Yamaha							10				6
29	(United Kingdom) Guy Sanders	Kawasaki			18			11					5
30	(Belgium) Olivier Depoorter	Yamaha	24	26	29	17	Ret	17	Ret	18	35	12	4
31	(Switzerland) Raphaël Chèvre	Suzuki					DNS	27	WD	23	28	14	2
32	(Norway) Petter Solli	Yamaha	Ret	15	24	DNS	DNS	WD	Ret	Ret	34	15	2
33	(Australia) Nick Henderson	Suzuki	16	23	23	19	Ret	15					1
	(Italy) Giuseppe Natalini	Yamaha	26	Ret	26	16	Ret	Ret					0
	(Italy) Giuseppe Natalini	Kawasaki									21	DNS	0
	(Italy) Diego Ciavattini	Yamaha				21	20	23	20	17	18	16	0
	(Netherlands) Leon Bovee	Suzuki	Ret	25	27	WD	17	21	Ret	21	24	20	0
	(France) Freddy Foray	Suzuki									17	19	0
	(Netherlands) Allard Kerkhoven	Suzuki	22	22	25	22	21	22	18	24	23	17	0
	(Italy) Mattia Angeloni	Yamaha				18							0
	(Poland) Bartłomiej Wiczynski	Suzuki					18						0
	(Belgium) Sepp Vermonden	Suzuki	27	Ret	19	Ret	19						0
	(United Kingdom) Jon Boy Lee	Yamaha						19					0
	(Belgium) Didier Heyndrickx	Suzuki						Ret	19	26			0
	(United Kingdom) Howie Manwaring	Yamaha			20								0
	(Spain) Javier Oliver	Yamaha	21										0
	(Italy) Alessandro Colatosti	Kawasaki								22	27	21	0
	(Republic of Ireland) Mark Pollock	Suzuki	Ret	Ret	22	Ret	25	Ret	22	DNQ	25	Ret	0
	(Belgium) Eric Van Bael	Suzuki	28	Ret	30	24	22	DNQ	23	DNQ	Ret	22	0
	(Italy) Mauro Belliero	Honda	23	24	28	23	24	25	Ret	27			0
	(Italy) Andrea Paoloni	Suzuki		23	WD								0
	(Italy) Giuseppe Barone	MV Agusta	Ret	Ret									0
	(Italy) Giuseppe Barone	Suzuki			DNQ		23	Ret	Ret	25	26	Ret	0
	(United Kingdom) Patrick McDougall	Suzuki						28	DNQ	28	30	23	0
	(France) David Fouloy	Suzuki	25	Ret	Ret	WD							0
	(Italy) Gabriele Perri	Suzuki		27									0
	(Italy) Giuseppe Cedroni	Honda	DNS	28	DNQ	Ret	Ret	Ret					0
	(Qatar) Mashel Al Naimi	Kawasaki	29					29			33		0
	(Poland) Marek Szkopek	Kawasaki									29		0
	(Italy) Gianluca Rapicavoli	MV Agusta	DNS	DNS	31	Ret							0
	(Italy) Robert Gianfardoni	Yamaha							DNQ	DNQ	31	Ret	0
	(Italy) William Marconi	Honda									32		0
	(Italy) Tommaso Lorenzetti	Honda				Ret	Ret						0
	(Italy) Fabrizio Perotti	Kawasaki							Ret	WD			0
	(Netherlands) Jarno Van Der Marel	Suzuki							Ret				0
	(United Kingdom) Adam Jenkinson	Honda										Ret	0
	(France) Anthony Dos Santos	Yamaha										WD	
Pos.	Rider	Bike	ESP (Spain)	ITA (Italy)	EUR (Europe)	SMR (San Marino)	CZE (Czech Republic)	GBR (United Kingdom)	NED (Netherlands)	GER (Germany)	ITA (Italy)	FRA (France)	Pts

Colour	Result
Gold	Winner
Silver	Second place
Bronze	Third place
Green	Points classification
Blue	Non-points classification
Blue	Non-classified finish (NC)
Purple	Retired, not classified (Ret)
Red	Did not qualify (DNQ)
Red	Did not pre-qualify (DNPQ)
Black	Disqualified (DSQ)
White	Did not start (DNS)
White	Withdrew (WD)
White	Race cancelled (C)
Blank	Did not practice (DNP)
Blank	Did not arrive (DNA)
Blank	Excluded (EX)

**Bold** – Pole position
Italics – Fastest lap

=== Manufacturers' championship ===
Pos.	Manufacturer	ESP (Spain)	ITA (Italy)	EUR (Europe)	SMR (San Marino)	CZE (Czech Republic)	GBR (United Kingdom)	NED (Netherlands)	GER (Germany)	ITA (Italy)	FRA (France)	Pts
1	(Japan) Suzuki	1	1	2	1	7	2	2	2	2	2	204
2	(Italy) MV Agusta	3	3	3	2	1	1	5	5	1	4	178
3	(Japan) Yamaha	4	8	1	5	4	4	1	1	4	1	171
4	(Japan) Kawasaki	2	2	8	7	6	5	7	14	11	7	103
5	(Japan) Honda	12	16	13	8	3	12	13	9	14	8	55
Pos.	Manufacturer	ESP (Spain)	ITA (Italy)	EUR (Europe)	SMR (San Marino)	CZE (Czech Republic)	GBR (United Kingdom)	NED (Netherlands)	GER (Germany)	ITA (Italy)	FRA (France)	Pts
