= Mashel Al Naimi =

Qatari motorcycle racer (born 1983)

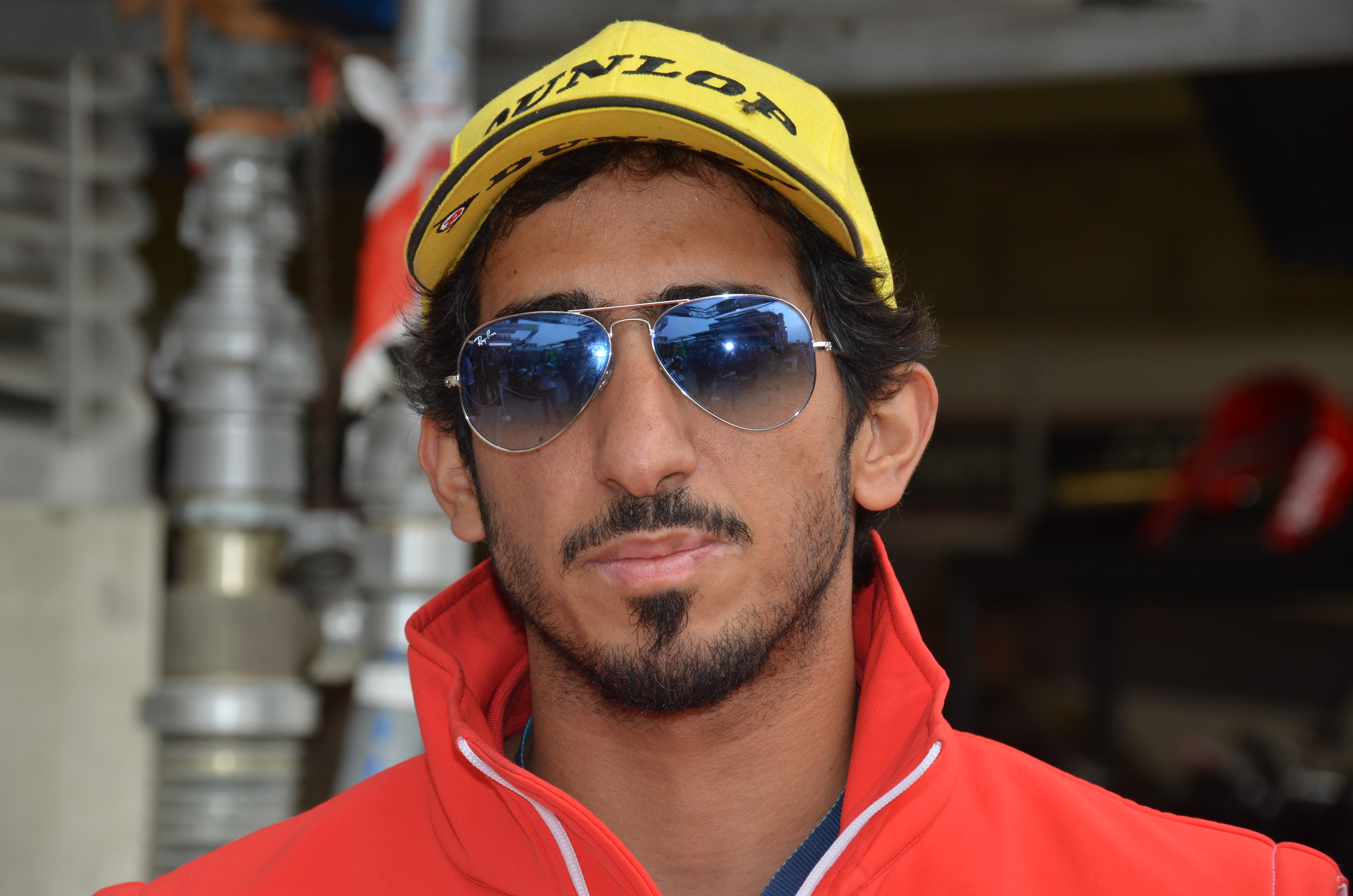
- Al Naimi at the 2015 24 Hours of Le Mans
- Nationality: (Qatar) Qatari
- Born: 8 September 1983 (age 43); Doha, Qatar
Motorcycle racing career statistics
Moto2 World Championship
Active years	2010–2011, 2014
Manufacturers	BQR-Moto2, Moriwaki, Speed Up
Championships	0
2014 championship position	NC (0 pts)
Starts / Wins / Podiums / Poles / F. laps / Points; 33 / 0 / 0 / 0 / 0 / 0
Superbike World Championship
Active years	2007
Manufacturers	Kawasaki
Starts / Wins / Podiums / Poles / F. laps / Points; 2 / 0 / 0 / 0 / 0 / 0

Mashel Al Naimi (born 8 September 1983 in Doha) is a Qatari motorcycle racer.

== Career statistics ==
- 2006 - NC, FIM Superstock 1000 Cup, Kawasaki

=== FIM Superstock 1000 Cup ===
==== Races by year ====
(key) (Races in bold indicate pole position) (Races in italics indicate fastest lap)

Year	Bike	1	2	3	4	5	6	7	8	9	10	Pos	Pts
2006	Kawasaki	VAL; 29	MNZ	SIL	SMR	BRN	BRA; 29	NED	LAU	IMO; 33	MAG	NC	0

=== Superbike World Championship ===
==== Races by year ====
Year	Make	1		2		3		4		5		6		7		8		9		10		11		12		13		Pos.	Pts
Year	Make	R1	R2	R1	R2	R1	R2	R1	R2	R1	R2	R1	R2	R1	R2	R1	R2	R1	R2	R1	R2	R1	R2	R1	R2	R1	R2	Pos.	Pts
2007	Kawasaki	QAT; 17	QAT; 20	AUS	AUS	EUR	EUR	SPA	SPA	NED	NED	ITA	ITA	GBR	GBR	SMR	SMR	CZE	CZE	GBR	GBR	GER	GER	ITA	ITA	FRA	FRA	NC	0

=== Grand Prix motorcycle racing ===
==== By season ====
Season	Class	Motorcycle	Team	Race	Win	Podium	Pole	FLap	Pts	Plcd
2010	Moto2	BQR-Moto2	Blusens-STX	15	0	0	0	0	0	NC
2011	Moto2	Moriwaki	QMMF Racing Team	17	0	0	0	0	0	NC
2014	Moto2	Speed Up	QMMF Racing Team	1	0	0	0	0	0	NC
Total				**33**	**0**	**0**	**0**	**0**	**0**	

==== Races by year ====
(key)

Year	Class	Bike	1	2	3	4	5	6	7	8	9	10	11	12	13	14	15	16	17	18	Pos.	Pts
2010	Moto2	BQR-Moto2	QAT; 31	SPA; 34	FRA; 28	ITA	GBR	NED; 31	CAT; 26	GER; Ret	CZE; 30	INP; Ret	RSM; 27	ARA; Ret	JPN; 28	MAL; 29	AUS; Ret	POR; 29	VAL; 32		NC	0
2011	Moto2	Moriwaki	QAT; Ret	SPA; 33	POR; 28	FRA; 31	CAT; Ret	GBR; 24	NED; 25	ITA; 31	GER; 30	CZE; 30	INP; 35	RSM; 30	ARA; 32	JPN; 29	AUS; 28	MAL; 24	VAL; 27		NC	0
2014	Moto2	Speed Up	QAT; Ret	AME	ARG	SPA	FRA	ITA	CAT	NED	GER	INP	CZE	GBR	RSM	ARA	JPN	AUS	MAL	VAL	NC	0
