= 2006 Imola Superbike World Championship round =

(Italy) 2006 Imola Superbike World Championship round
Round details
- Round 11 of 12 rounds in the 2006 Superbike World Championship. and Round 11 of 12 rounds in the 2006 Supersport World Championship.
- Date: October 1, 2006
- Location: Autodromo Enzo e Dino Ferrari
- Course: Permanent racing facility 4.959 km (3.081 mi)

Superbike World Championship
Pole position
(Australia) Troy Bayliss
1:48.804
Fastest lap race 1	Fastest lap race 2
(Brazil) Alex Barros	(Australia) Troy Bayliss
1:50.266	1:50.530

Supersport World Championship
Pole position
(France) Sébastien Charpentier
1:52.245
Fastest lap
(France) Sébastien Charpentier
1:53.388

The 2006 Imola Superbike World Championship round was the eleventh round of the 2006 Superbike World Championship. It took place on the weekend of September 29 – October 1, 2006 at the Imola circuit.

== Results ==
=== Superbike race 1 classification ===
Pos	No	Rider	Bike	Laps	Time	Grid	Points
1	4	(Brazil) Alex Barros	Honda CBR1000RR	21	39:00.096	8	25
2	52	(United Kingdom) James Toseland	Honda CBR1000RR	21	+4.351	2	20
3	88	(Australia) Andrew Pitt	Yamaha YZF R1	21	+6.809	3	16
4	41	(Japan) Noriyuki Haga	Yamaha YZF R1	21	+11.179	7	13
5	21	(Australia) Troy Bayliss	Ducati 999 F06	21	+11.537	1	11
6	57	(Italy) Lorenzo Lanzi	Ducati 999 F06	21	+20.974	10	10
7	10	(Spain) Fonsi Nieto	Kawasaki ZX 10R	21	+23.055	18	9
8	31	(Australia) Karl Muggeridge	Honda CBR1000RR	21	+23.747	13	8
9	3	(Japan) Norifumi Abe	Yamaha YZF R1	21	+27.289	15	7
10	55	(France) Régis Laconi	Kawasaki ZX 10R	21	+29.160	14	6
11	38	(Japan) Shinichi Nakatomi	Yamaha YZF R1	21	+30.792	22	5
12	9	(United Kingdom) Chris Walker	Kawasaki ZX 10R	21	+32.104	19	4
13	8	(Italy) Ivan Clementi	Ducati 999 RS	21	+38.537	12	3
14	44	(Italy) Roberto Rolfo	Ducati 999 F05	21	+45.410	27	2
15	25	(Australia) Josh Brookes	Kawasaki ZX 10R	21	+48.494	21	1
16	7	(Italy) Pierfrancesco Chili	Honda CBR1000RR	21	+48.656	26	
17	18	(United Kingdom) Craig Jones	Petronas FP1	21	+1:00.950	28	
18	85	(Italy) Valter Bartolini	Ducati 999 RS	21	+1:19.707	30	
Ret	66	(Italy) Norino Brignola	Ducati 999 RS	16	Retirement	24	
Ret	84	(Italy) Michel Fabrizio	Honda CBR1000RR	9	Retirement	11	
Ret	1	(Australia) Troy Corser	Suzuki GSX-R1000 K6	7	Retirement	4	
Ret	80	(United States) Kurtis Roberts	Ducati 999 RS	6	Retirement	20	
Ret	16	(France) Sébastien Gimbert	Yamaha YZF R1	4	Retirement	25	
Ret	20	(Italy) Marco Borciani	Ducati 999 F05	4	Retirement	23	
Ret	13	(Italy) Vittorio Iannuzzo	Suzuki GSX-R1000 K6	3	Retirement	16	
Ret	11	(Spain) Rubén Xaus	Ducati 999 F05	2	Retirement	9	
Ret	99	(Australia) Steve Martin	Petronas FP1	2	Retirement	17	
Ret	12	(Italy) Ivan Goi	Honda CBR1000RR	0	Retirement	29	
Ret	76	(Germany) Max Neukirchner	Suzuki GSX-R1000 K6	0	Retirement	6	
Ret	71	(Japan) Yukio Kagayama	Suzuki GSX-R1000 K6	0	Retirement	5	

=== Superbike race 2 classification ===
Pos	No	Rider	Bike	Laps	Time	Grid	Points
1	21	(Australia) Troy Bayliss	Ducati 999 F06	21	38:57.069	1	25
2	4	(Brazil) Alex Barros	Honda CBR1000RR	21	+1.413	8	20
3	71	(Japan) Yukio Kagayama	Suzuki GSX-R1000 K6	21	+4.355	5	16
4	88	(Australia) Andrew Pitt	Yamaha YZF R1	21	+5.387	3	13
5	52	(United Kingdom) James Toseland	Honda CBR1000RR	21	+6.418	2	11
6	41	(Japan) Noriyuki Haga	Yamaha YZF R1	21	+9.615	7	10
7	57	(Italy) Lorenzo Lanzi	Ducati 999 F06	21	+12.429	10	9
8	31	(Australia) Karl Muggeridge	Honda CBR1000RR	21	+14.895	13	8
9	1	(Australia) Troy Corser	Suzuki GSX-R1000 K6	21	+19.708	4	7
10	55	(France) Régis Laconi	Kawasaki ZX 10R	21	+20.577	14	6
11	3	(Japan) Norifumi Abe	Yamaha YZF R1	21	+23.473	15	5
12	38	(Japan) Shinichi Nakatomi	Yamaha YZF R1	21	+25.368	22	4
13	10	(Spain) Fonsi Nieto	Kawasaki ZX 10R	21	+31.340	18	3
14	9	(United Kingdom) Chris Walker	Kawasaki ZX 10R	21	+32.993	19	2
15	44	(Italy) Roberto Rolfo	Ducati 999 F05	21	+34.596	27	1
16	99	(Australia) Steve Martin	Petronas FP1	21	+41.830	17	
17	25	(Australia) Josh Brookes	Kawasaki ZX 10R	21	+45.582	21	
18	7	(Italy) Pierfrancesco Chili	Honda CBR1000RR	21	+1:07.086	26	
19	12	(Italy) Ivan Goi	Honda CBR1000RR	21	+1:10.984	29	
Ret	11	(Spain) Rubén Xaus	Ducati 999 F05	16	Retirement	9	
Ret	76	(Germany) Max Neukirchner	Suzuki GSX-R1000 K6	12	Retirement	6	
Ret	84	(Italy) Michel Fabrizio	Honda CBR1000RR	9	Retirement	11	
Ret	85	(Italy) Valter Bartolini	Ducati 999 RS	6	Retirement	30	
Ret	16	(France) Sébastien Gimbert	Yamaha YZF R1	6	Retirement	25	
Ret	18	(United Kingdom) Craig Jones	Petronas FP1	6	Retirement	28	
Ret	20	(Italy) Marco Borciani	Ducati 999 F05	5	Retirement	23	
Ret	66	(Italy) Norino Brignola	Ducati 999 RS	5	Retirement	24	
Ret	80	(United States) Kurtis Roberts	Ducati 999 RS	4	Retirement	20	
Ret	8	(Italy) Ivan Clementi	Ducati 999 RS	3	Retirement	12	
Ret	13	(Italy) Vittorio Iannuzzo	Suzuki GSX-R1000 K6	3	Retirement	16	

=== Supersport race classification ===
Pos	No	Rider	Bike	Laps	Time	Grid	Points
1	16	(France) Sébastien Charpentier	Honda CBR600RR	21	40:07.972	1	25
2	54	(Turkey) Kenan Sofuoğlu	Honda CBR600RR	21	+0.406	2	20
3	11	(Australia) Kevin Curtain	Yamaha YZF-R6	21	+9.627	4	16
4	45	(Italy) Gianluca Vizziello	Yamaha YZF-R6	21	+13.983	8	13
5	37	(San Marino) William De Angelis	Honda CBR600RR	21	+14.390	7	11
6	23	(Australia) Broc Parkes	Yamaha YZF-R6	21	+16.870	9	10
7	69	(Italy) Gianluca Nannelli	Ducati 749R	21	+18.171	5	9
8	3	(Japan) Katsuaki Fujiwara	Honda CBR600RR	21	+18.534	3	8
9	32	(France) Yoann Tiberio	Honda CBR600RR	21	+31.522	11	7
10	55	(Italy) Massimo Roccoli	Yamaha YZF-R6	21	+31.561	13	6
11	116	(Sweden) Johan Stigefelt	Honda CBR600RR	21	+32.047	10	5
12	94	(Spain) David Checa	Yamaha YZF-R6	21	+36.420	14	4
13	77	(Netherlands) Barry Veneman	Suzuki GSX-R600	21	+43.105	18	3
14	72	(United Kingdom) Stuart Easton	Ducati 749R	21	+43.674	21	2
15	21	(Canada) Chris Peris	Yamaha YZF-R6	21	+47.734	12	1
16	7	(France) Stéphane Chambon	Kawasaki ZX-6R	21	+52.288	17	
17	73	(Austria) Christian Zaiser	Ducati 749R	21	+56.674	15	
18	25	(Finland) Tatu Lauslehto	Honda CBR600RR	21	+1:05.815	28	
19	9	(Italy) Alessio Corradi	Yamaha YZF-R6	21	+1:06.452	32	
20	65	(Spain) Joan Lascorz	Honda CBR600RR	21	+1:06.777	31	
21	27	(United Kingdom) Tom Tunstall	Honda CBR600RR	21	+1:08.116	26	
22	31	(Finland) Vesa Kallio	Yamaha YZF-R6	21	+1:14.707	30	
23	24	(Italy) Stefano Cruciani	Honda CBR600RR	21	+1:17.723	22	
24	35	(Spain) Jordi Torres	Yamaha YZF-R6	21	+1:17.952	33	
25	60	(Russia) Vladimir Ivanov	Yamaha YZF-R6	21	+1:25.329	25	
26	93	(France) Stéphane Duterne	Yamaha YZF-R6	21	+1:56.727	34	
Ret	17	(Portugal) Miguel Praia	Honda CBR600RR	19	Retirement	29	
Ret	6	(Italy) Mauro Sanchini	Yamaha YZF-R6	13	Retirement	16	
Ret	22	(Norway) Kai Børre Andersen	Suzuki GSX-R600	9	Accident	19	
Ret	15	(Italy) Andrea Berta	Yamaha YZF-R6	9	Retirement	35	
Ret	88	(France) Julien Enjolras	Yamaha YZF-R6	7	Retirement	24	
Ret	8	(France) Maxime Berger	Kawasaki ZX-6R	4	Retirement	20	
Ret	57	(Slovenia) Luka Nedog	Ducati 749R	3	Retirement	27	
Ret	18	(France) Matthieu Lagrive	Honda CBR600RR	1	Retirement	23	
Ret	127	(Denmark) Robbin Harms	Honda CBR600RR	0	Accident	6	

== Superstock 1000 race classification ==
Pos.	No.	Rider	Bike	Laps	Time/Retired	Grid	Points
1	9	(Italy) Luca Scassa	MV Agusta F4 1000 R	12	23:01.924	1	25
2	26	(Australia) Brendan Roberts	Suzuki GSX-R1000 K6	12	+2.743	3	20
3	53	(Italy) Alessandro Polita	Suzuki GSX-R1000 K6	12	+3.281	7	16
4	77	(Italy) Claudio Corti	Yamaha YZF-R1	12	+3.367	4	13
5	86	(Italy) Ayrton Badovini	MV Agusta F4 1000 R	12	+5.682	5	11
6	15	(Italy) Matteo Baiocco	Yamaha YZF-R1	12	+8.790	6	10
7	8	(France) Loïc Napoleone	Suzuki GSX-R1000 K6	12	+12.768	9	9
8	44	(Italy) Roberto Lunadei	Yamaha YZF-R1	12	+17.844	11	8
9	99	(Italy) Danilo Dell'Omo	Suzuki GSX-R1000 K6	12	+18.270	10	7
10	12	(Germany) Leonardo Biliotti	MV Agusta F4 1000 R	12	+18.650	12	6
11	38	(Italy) Gilles Boccolini	Kawasaki ZX-10R	12	+19.192	8	5
12	24	(Slovenia) Marko Jerman	Suzuki GSX-R1000 K6	12	+19.328	13	4
13	16	(Spain) Enrique Rocamora	Yamaha YZF-R1	12	+20.873	14	3
14	96	(Czech Republic) Matěj Smrž	Honda CBR1000RR	12	+25.488	20	2
15	75	(Germany) Arne Tode	Suzuki GSX-R1000 K6	12	+25.945	17	1
16	32	(South Africa) Sheridan Morais	Suzuki GSX-R1000 K6	12	+29.125	16	
17	72	(France) Freddy Foray	Suzuki GSX-R1000 K6	12	+37.881	23	
18	90	(Italy) Diego Ciavattini	Yamaha YZF-R1	12	+39.080	19	
19	47	(United Kingdom) Richard Cooper	Honda CBR1000RR	12	+39.520	21	
20	57	(Italy) Ilario Dionisi	MV Agusta F4 1000 R	12	+41.471	2	
21	10	(Italy) Giuseppe Natalini	Kawasaki ZX-10R	12	+42.110	22	
22	40	(Switzerland) Hervé Gantner	Honda CBR1000RR	12	+42.902	18	
23	35	(Netherlands) Allard Kerkhoven	Suzuki GSX-R1000 K6	12	+55.260	29	
24	21	(Netherlands) Leon Bovee	Suzuki GSX-R1000 K6	12	+55.524	28	
25	34	(Republic of Ireland) Mark Pollock	Suzuki GSX-R1000 K6	12	+1:03.367	30	
26	31	(Italy) Giuseppe Barone	Suzuki GSX-R1000 K6	12	+1:03.593	27	
27	27	(Italy) Alessandro Colatosti	Kawasaki ZX-10R	12	+1:03.894	33	
28	89	(Switzerland) Raphael Chevre	Suzuki GSX-R1000 K6	12	+1:05.396	32	
29	84	(Poland) Marek Szkopek	Kawasaki ZX-10R	12	+1:07.314	31	
30	33	(United Kingdom) Patrick McDougall	Suzuki GSX-R1000 K6	12	+1:16.743	36	
31	58	(Italy) Robert Gianfardoni	Yamaha YZF-R1	12	+1:27.199	37	
32	121	(Italy) William Marconi	Honda CBR1000RR	12	+1:27.487	34	
33	95	(Qatar) Mashel Al Naimi	Kawasaki ZX-10R	12	+1:49.612	38	
34	71	(Norway) Petter Solli	Yamaha YZF-R1	11	+1 lap	26	
35	55	(Belgium) Olivier Depoorter	Suzuki GSX-R1000 K6	11	+1 lap	25	
Ret	5	(Italy) Riccardo Chiarello	Kawasaki ZX-10R	11	Retirement	15	
Ret	73	(Italy) Simone Saltarelli	Yamaha YZF-R1	9	Accident	24	
Ret	18	(Belgium) Eric Van Baell	Suzuki GSX-R1000 K6	4	Technical problem	35	

== Superstock 600 race classification ==
Pos.	No.	Rider	Bike	Laps	Time/Retired	Grid	Points
1	10	(Italy) Davide Giugliano	Kawasaki ZX-6R	9	17:56.316	2	25
2	19	(Belgium) Xavier Simeon	Suzuki GSX-R600	9	+1.731	1	20
3	74	(France) Sylvain Barrier	Yamaha YZF-R6	9	+11.226	6	16
4	40	(Italy) Michele Magnoni	Yamaha YZF-R6	9	+13.497	8	13
5	99	(Netherlands) Roy Ten Napel	Yamaha YZF-R6	9	+14.932	4	11
6	24	(Italy) Daniele Beretta	Suzuki GSX-R600	9	+18.988	10	10
7	49	(Italy) Davide Bastianelli	Yamaha YZF-R6	9	+19.217	7	9
8	37	(Poland) Andrzej Chmielewski	Yamaha YZF-R6	9	+25.901	17	8
9	89	(Italy) Domenico Colucci	Ducati 749R	9	+26.034	11	7
10	75	(Germany) Dennis Sigloch	Yamaha YZF-R6	9	+26.376	16	6
11	41	(Switzerland) Gregory Junod	Suzuki GSX-R600	9	+26.665	18	5
12	88	(Norway) Mads Odin Hodt	Yamaha YZF-R6	9	+27.242	15	4
13	84	(Slovenia) Boštjan Pintar	Yamaha YZF-R6	9	+27.270	12	3
14	18	(United Kingdom) Matt Bond	Suzuki GSX-R600	9	+32.046	21	2
15	77	(United Kingdom) Barry Burrell	Honda CBR600RR	9	+32.794	19	1
16	30	(Switzerland) Michaël Savary	Yamaha YZF-R6	9	+32.915	14	
17	31	(Netherlands) Lennart Van Houwelingen	Suzuki GSX-R600	9	+34.250	22	
18	21	(France) Franck Millet	Yamaha YZF-R6	9	+34.865	25	
19	34	(Sweden) Alexander Lundh	Honda CBR600RR	9	+36.607	30	
20	47	(Italy) Eddi La Marra	Yamaha YZF-R6	9	+38.190	13	
21	55	(Belgium) Vincent Lonbois	Suzuki GSX-R600	9	+40.855	29	
22	16	(United Kingdom) Christopher Northover	Suzuki GSX-R600	9	+41.024	32	
23	25	(Czech Republic) Patrik Vostárek	Honda CBR600RR	9	+41.717	27	
24	45	(Italy) Daniele Rossi	Kawasaki ZX-6R	9	+43.633	20	
25	56	(Switzerland) Daniel Sutter	Honda CBR600RR	9	+45.147	31	
26	58	(Switzerland) Gabriel Berclaz	Yamaha YZF-R6	9	+47.253	24	
27	46	(United Kingdom) Leon Hunt	Yamaha YZF-R6	9	+54.857	33	
28	71	(Italy) Ricky Parker	Kawasaki ZX-6R	9	+58.537	34	
29	28	(Spain) Yannick Guerra	Yamaha YZF-R6	9	+1:03.926	35	
30	12	(Italy) Davide Caldart	Kawasaki ZX-6R	9	+1:37.078	36	
Ret	26	(United States) Will Gruy	Yamaha YZF-R6	8	Accident	23	
Ret	36	(Italy) Jarno Colosio	Suzuki GSX-R600	5	Accident	28	
Ret	8	(Italy) Andrea Antonelli	Honda CBR600RR	4	Accident	3	
Ret	7	(Italy) Renato Costantini	Honda CBR600RR	3	Accident	9	
Ret	69	(Czech Republic) Ondřej Ježek	Kawasaki ZX-6R	3	Accident	5	
Ret	15	(France) Kevin Galdes	Kawasaki ZX-6R	3	Accident	26	
WD	44	(Italy) Cristiano Erbacci	Yamaha YZF-R6		Withdrew		
WD	199	(United Kingdom) Gregg Black	Honda CBR600RR		Withdrew		
