= Steve Martin (motorcyclist) =

Australian motorcycle racer

- Nationality: Australian
- Born: 2 December 1968 (age 57); South Australia, Australia
Motorcycle racing career statistics
Grand Prix motorcycle racing
Active years	1999
Team	Honda
Championships	0
Starts / Wins / Podiums / Poles / F. laps / Points; 4 / 0 / 0 / 0 / 0 / 2
Superbike World Championship
Active years	18
Manufacturers	Suzuki, Ducati, Petronas, Yamaha, Honda, BMW
Championships	0
2009 championship position	NC
Starts / Wins / Podiums / Poles / F. laps / Points; 182 / 0 / 5 / 3 / 1 / 549
Supersport World Championship
Active years	2007
Manufacturers	Yamaha
Championships	0
2007 championship position	32nd
Starts / Wins / Podiums / Poles / F. laps / Points; 1 / 0 / 0 / 0 / 0 / 6

FIM Endurance World Championship
- Active years: 2007-2012
- Championships: 1 (2009)
- Team(s): Yamaha Austria Racing Team
- Last season (2012): 6th
Starts	Wins	Podiums	Poles	F. laps
18	5	9	1	1

Steven James Martin (born 2 December 1968) is an Australian retired motorcycle road racer and racing commentator. He currently resides in Melbourne, Australia. He is the 2009 World Endurance Champion for YART (Yamaha Austria Racing Team), but is a veteran of the World Superbike Championship, and former champion of the Australian series.

After success in trials, Martin started racing in his home Superbike Championship in 1990, initially on a factory Suzuki. Years on private bikes followed, but he later earned a Ducati ride. He led the 1998 standings until a crash at Phillip Island, but won the title in 1999. He also did an assortment of wild card rides in the Superbike World Championship rounds at Phillip Island over the years, as well as four 500cc Grand Prix races in 1999.

After that, Martin moved to the Australian Supersport series, before moving to the Superbike World Championship full-time for 2001, riding on Pirelli tyres for DFXtreme. He scored a pair of top-six finishes at Imola in 2001, and set fastest lap at the Lausitzring that year, but he was not a frontrunner for much of 2001 or 2002. However, he stepped up to eighth overall in 2003 and seventh in 2004, along with three pole positions and five podiums. He spent the next two years with Carl Fogarty's Foggy Petronas team, which struggled to be competitive with its three-cylinder machine, although beating team-mates Garry McCoy and Craig Jones in those years. He returned to DFXtreme for 2007, turning down other offers as he believed the team had enough funds for the full season. It soon became clear that this was not the case - he nearly lost the ride after two races, but continued for rounds 3 and 4, before leaving the team as it could not provide a full-time entry. He moved into the World Supersport Championship at Assen, replacing injured countryman Kevin Curtain Later in 2007, he contested the Suzuka 8 Hours race, and he made World Superbike starts on Yamaha and Suzuki equipment, but finished the season with a broken metatarsal.

In 2008, Martin retired from World Superbike racing but joined the World Superbike Championship as a commentator alongside Jonathan Green. He continued to race a Superbike and finished first in the World Endurance Championship for YART (Yamaha Austria Racing Team). BMW also retained his services as a development rider for their new S1000RR Superbike project, which led to a one-off return at Kyalami in place of Troy Corser.

== Career statistics ==
=== Superbike World Championship ===
==== Races by year ====
(key) (Races in bold indicate pole position) (Races in italics indicate fastest lap)

Year	Make	1		2		3		4		5		6		7		8		9		10		11		12		13		14		Pos.	Pts
Year	Make	R1	R2	R1	R2	R1	R2	R1	R2	R1	R2	R1	R2	R1	R2	R1	R2	R1	R2	R1	R2	R1	R2	R1	R2	R1	R2	R1	R2	Pos.	Pts
1989	Suzuki	GBR	GBR	HUN	HUN	CAN	CAN	USA	USA	AUT	AUT	FRA	FRA	JPN	JPN	GER	GER	ITA	ITA	AUS; 15	AUS; Ret	NZL	NZL							87th	1
1990	Suzuki	SPA	SPA	GBR	GBR	HUN	HUN	GER	GER	CAN	CAN	USA	USA	AUT	AUT	JPN	JPN	FRA	FRA	ITA	ITA	MAL	MAL	AUS; 11	AUS; 10	NZL	NZL			41st	11
1991	Suzuki	GBR	GBR	SPA	SPA	CAN	CAN	USA	USA	AUT	AUT	SMR	SMR	SWE	SWE	JPN	JPN	MAL	MAL	GER	GER	FRA	FRA	ITA	ITA	AUS; 8	AUS; 7			36th	17
1992	Suzuki	SPA	SPA	GBR	GBR	GER	GER	BEL	BEL	SPA	SPA	AUT	AUT	ITA	ITA	MAL	MAL	JPN	JPN	NED	NED	ITA	ITA	AUS; 16	AUS; 16	NZL	NZL			NC	0
1994	Suzuki	GBR	GBR	GER	GER	ITA	ITA	SPA	SPA	AUT	AUT	INA	INA	JPN	JPN	NED	NED	SMR	SMR	EUR	EUR	AUS; 15	AUS; 15							61st	2
1995	Suzuki	GER	GER	SMR	SMR	GBR	GBR	ITA	ITA	SPA	SPA	AUT	AUT	USA	USA	EUR	EUR	JPN	JPN	NED	NED	INA	INA	AUS; 16	AUS; 16					NC	0
1996	Suzuki	SMR	SMR	GBR	GBR	GER	GER	ITA	ITA	CZE	CZE	USA	USA	EUR	EUR	INA; Ret	INA; 15	JPN	JPN	NED	NED	SPA	SPA	AUS; 14	AUS; Ret					49th	3
1997	Suzuki	AUS; 16	AUS; Ret	SMR	SMR	GBR	GBR	GER	GER	ITA	ITA	USA	USA	EUR	EUR	AUT	AUT	NED	NED	SPA	SPA	JPN	JPN	INA	INA					NC	0
1998	Ducati	AUS; Ret	AUS; 10	GBR	GBR	ITA	ITA	SPA	SPA	GER	GER	SMR	SMR	RSA	RSA	USA	USA	EUR	EUR	AUT	AUT	NED	NED	JPN	JPN					36th	6
1999	Ducati	RSA	RSA	AUS; Ret	AUS; 7	GBR	GBR	SPA	SPA	ITA	ITA	GER	GER	SMR	SMR	USA	USA	EUR	EUR	AUT	AUT	NED	NED	GER	GER	JPN	JPN			41st	9
2001	Ducati	SPA; 11	SPA; Ret	RSA; 19	RSA; 17	AUS; 12	AUS; C	JPN; 19	JPN; 20	ITA; Ret	ITA; 14	GBR; 17	GBR; 18	GER; 15	GER; 14	SMR; 13	SMR; Ret	USA; 14	USA; 13	EUR; 14	EUR; 18	GER; Ret	GER; 14	NED; 20	NED; 20	ITA; 6	ITA; 5			17th	47
2002	Ducati	SPA; 17	SPA; 9	AUS; 13	AUS; Ret	RSA; Ret	RSA; Ret	JPN; 17	JPN; 20	ITA; 10	ITA; 11	GBR; Ret	GBR; 19	GER; 9	GER; 11	SMR; 13	SMR; 12	USA; 14	USA; 11	GBR; 19	GBR; 16	GER	GER	NED; Ret	NED; DNS	ITA; 13	ITA; 14			16th	52
2003	Ducati	SPA; 6	SPA; 5	AUS; 4	AUS; 9	JPN; 15	JPN; Ret	ITA; 9	ITA; 7	GER; 6	GER; 6	GBR; Ret	GBR; Ret	SMR; 6	SMR; 9	USA; Ret	USA; Ret	GBR; 14	GBR; Ret	NED; 9	NED; 11	ITA; 6	ITA; Ret	FRA; 7	FRA; 5					8th	139
2004	Ducati	SPA; Ret	SPA; 3	AUS; 4	AUS; Ret	**SMR**; 7	**SMR**; 3	ITA; Ret	ITA; 8	GER; 5	GER; Ret	GBR; 6	GBR; 6	**USA**; 3	**USA**; 6	**EUR**; 3	**EUR**; Ret	NED; 7	NED; Ret	ITA; 6	ITA; 3	FRA; 5	FRA; Ret							7th	181
2005	Petronas	QAT; 15	QAT; Ret	AUS; Ret	AUS; Ret	SPA; Ret	SPA; 17	ITA; Ret	ITA; Ret	EUR; Ret	EUR; 20	SMR; 11	SMR; 8	CZE; 17	CZE; 16	GBR; 15	GBR; Ret	NED; 14	NED; 16	GER; 18	GER; 9	ITA; 5	ITA; C	FRA; Ret	FRA; DNS					18th	35
2006	Petronas	QAT; 18	QAT; 18	AUS; 14	AUS; 15	SPA; Ret	SPA; 15	ITA; Ret	ITA; Ret	EUR; Ret	EUR; Ret	SMR; Ret	SMR; 17	CZE; Ret	CZE; 19	GBR; 17	GBR; 16	NED; 12	NED; 11	GER; 14	GER; 12	ITA; Ret	ITA; 16	FRA; Ret	FRA; Ret					21st	19
2007	Honda	QAT; 11	QAT; 18	AUS; 10	AUS; Ret	EUR; 19	EUR; 13	SPA; Ret	SPA; Ret	NED	NED	ITA; 16	ITA; Ret	GBR	GBR	SMR	SMR	CZE	CZE											18th	27
2007	Yamaha																			GBR; 11	GBR; 16									18th	27
2007	Suzuki																					GER; 14	GER; 14	ITA; 14	ITA; 14	FRA; 16	FRA; Ret			18th	27
2009	BMW	AUS	AUS	QAT	QAT	SPA	SPA	NED	NED	ITA	ITA	RSA; 22	RSA; 18	USA	USA	SMR	SMR	GBR	GBR	CZE	CZE	GER	GER	ITA	ITA	FRA	FRA	POR	POR	NC	0

=== Grand Prix motorcycle racing ===
==== Races by year ====
(key) (Races in bold indicate pole position, races in italics indicate fastest lap)

Year	Class	Bike	1	2	3	4	5	6	7	8	9	10	11	12	13	14	15	16	Pos.	Pts
1999	500cc	Honda	MAL	JPN	SPA	FRA	ITA	CAT	NED	GBR	GER	CZE	IMO	VAL	AUS; 14	RSA; 21	BRA; Ret	ARG; 20	32nd	2

=== Supersport World Championship ===
==== Races by year ====
(key) (Races in bold indicate pole position) (Races in italics indicate fastest lap)

Year	Bike	1	2	3	4	5	6	7	8	9	10	11	12	13	Pos.	Pts
2007	Yamaha	QAT	AUS	EUR	SPA	NED; 10	ITA	GBR	SMR	CZE	GBR	GER	ITA	FRA	32nd	6

=== FIM Endurance World Championship ===
Year	Team	Bike	Rider	TC
2007	Yamaha Austria Racing Team	Yamaha YZF-R1	(Australia) Steve Martin (Slovenia) Igor Jerman (France) Sebastien Scarnato (Australia) Damian Cudlin	3rd
2008	(Austria) Yamaha Austrian Endurance Team	Yamaha YZF-R1	(Slovenia) Igor Jerman (United Kingdom) Steve Martin (United Kingdom) Steve Plater (France) Gwen Giabbani	2nd
2009	Yamaha Austria Racing Team	Yamaha YZF-R1	(Australia) Steve Martin (Slovenia) Igor Jerman (France) Gwen Giabbani	1st
2010	Yamaha Austria Racing Team	Yamaha YZF-R1	(Australia) Steve Martin (Slovenia) Igor Jerman (France) Gwen Giabbani	3rd
2011	Yamaha Austria Racing Team	Yamaha YZF-R1	(Australia) Steve Martin (Slovenia) Igor Jerman (France) Gwen Giabbani (Japan) Katsuyuki Nakasuga (France) Loris Baz	5th
2012	Yamaha Austria Racing Team	Yamaha YZF-R1	(Australia) Steve Martin (Slovenia) Igor Jerman (France) Gwen Giabbani (Japan) Noriyuki Haga (Japan) Katsuyuki Nakasuga (United Kingdom) Tommy Hill	6th
