= 2006 Magny-Cours Superbike World Championship round =

(France) 2006 Magny-Cours Superbike World Championship round
Round details
- Round 12 of 12 rounds in the 2006 Superbike World Championship. and Round 12 of 12 rounds in the 2006 Supersport World Championship.
- Date: October 8, 2006
- Location: Circuit de Nevers Magny-Cours
- Course: Permanent racing facility 4.411 km (2.741 mi)

Superbike World Championship
Pole position
(Australia) Troy Corser
1:39.147
Fastest lap race 1	Fastest lap race 2
(Japan) Noriyuki Haga	(Australia) Troy Bayliss
1:40.523	1:40.370

Supersport World Championship
Pole position
(France) Sébastien Charpentier
1:42.506
Fastest lap
(Turkey) Kenan Sofuoglu
1:43.429

The 2006 Magny-Cours Superbike World Championship round was the last round of the 2006 Superbike World Championship. It took place on the weekend of October 6–8, 2006 at the Circuit de Nevers Magny-Cours.

== Results ==
=== Superbike race 1 classification ===
Pos	No	Rider	Bike	Laps	Time	Grid	Points
1	52	(United Kingdom) James Toseland	Honda CBR1000RR	23	38:53.856	2	25
2	41	(Japan) Noriyuki Haga	Yamaha YZF R1	23	+0.115	5	20
3	1	(Australia) Troy Corser	Suzuki GSX-R1000 K6	23	+0.412	1	16
4	21	(Australia) Troy Bayliss	Ducati 999 F06	23	+3.000	6	13
5	71	(Japan) Yukio Kagayama	Suzuki GSX-R1000 K6	23	+7.152	8	11
6	9	(United Kingdom) Chris Walker	Kawasaki ZX 10R	23	+14.906	11	10
7	4	(Brazil) Alex Barros	Honda CBR1000RR	23	+17.330	13	9
8	57	(Italy) Lorenzo Lanzi	Ducati 999 F06	23	+17.474	3	8
9	55	(France) Régis Laconi	Kawasaki ZX 10R	23	+25.257	15	7
10	38	(Japan) Shinichi Nakatomi	Yamaha YZF R1	23	+25.883	14	6
11	84	(Italy) Michel Fabrizio	Honda CBR1000RR	23	+31.542	16	5
12	76	(Germany) Max Neukirchner	Suzuki GSX-R1000 K6	23	+33.422	7	4
13	3	(Japan) Norifumi Abe	Yamaha YZF R1	23	+36.159	18	3
14	44	(Italy) Roberto Rolfo	Ducati 999 F05	23	+40.867	19	2
15	25	(Australia) Josh Brookes	Kawasaki ZX 10R	23	+50.110	22	1
16	13	(Italy) Vittorio Iannuzzo	Ducati 999 F05	23	+52.436	24	
17	18	(United Kingdom) Craig Jones	Petronas FP1	23	+52.638	25	
18	88	(Australia) Andrew Pitt	Yamaha YZF R1	23	+57.659	9	
19	12	(Italy) Ivan Goi	Honda CBR1000RR	23	+1:29.905	26	
Ret	36	(Czech Republic) Jiří Dražďák	Yamaha YZF R1	14	Retirement	27	
Ret	99	(Australia) Steve Martin	Petronas FP1	10	Retirement	21	
Ret	31	(Australia) Karl Muggeridge	Honda CBR1000RR	8	Retirement	4	
Ret	7	(Italy) Pierfrancesco Chili	Honda CBR1000RR	6	Retirement	17	
Ret	8	(Italy) Ivan Clementi	Ducati 999 RS	5	Retirement	20	
Ret	10	(Spain) Fonsi Nieto	Kawasaki ZX 10R	4	Retirement	10	
Ret	80	(United States) Kurtis Roberts	Ducati 999 RS	2	Retirement	23	
Ret	16	(France) Sébastien Gimbert	Yamaha YZF R1	1	Retirement	12	

=== Superbike race 2 classification ===
Pos	No	Rider	Bike	Laps	Time	Grid	Points
1	21	(Australia) Troy Bayliss	Ducati 999 F06	23	38:54.239	6	25
2	1	(Australia) Troy Corser	Suzuki GSX-R1000 K6	23	+1.282	1	20
3	52	(United Kingdom) James Toseland	Honda CBR1000RR	23	+3.388	2	16
4	41	(Japan) Noriyuki Haga	Yamaha YZF R1	23	+8.524	5	13
5	88	(Australia) Andrew Pitt	Yamaha YZF R1	23	+11.836	9	11
6	31	(Australia) Karl Muggeridge	Honda CBR1000RR	23	+14.126	4	10
7	57	(Italy) Lorenzo Lanzi	Ducati 999 F06	23	+15.217	3	9
8	9	(United Kingdom) Chris Walker	Kawasaki ZX 10R	23	+18.212	11	8
9	71	(Japan) Yukio Kagayama	Suzuki GSX-R1000 K6	23	+20.224	8	7
10	4	(Brazil) Alex Barros	Honda CBR1000RR	23	+23.387	13	6
11	16	(France) Sébastien Gimbert	Yamaha YZF R1	23	+28.965	12	5
12	3	(Japan) Norifumi Abe	Yamaha YZF R1	23	+33.071	18	4
13	84	(Italy) Michel Fabrizio	Honda CBR1000RR	23	+33.125	16	3
14	76	(Germany) Max Neukirchner	Suzuki GSX-R1000 K6	23	+35.223	7	2
15	7	(Italy) Pierfrancesco Chili	Honda CBR1000RR	23	+40.136	17	1
16	25	(Australia) Josh Brookes	Kawasaki ZX 10R	23	+40.716	22	
17	44	(Italy) Roberto Rolfo	Ducati 999 F05	23	+41.827	19	
18	55	(France) Régis Laconi	Kawasaki ZX 10R	22	+1 lap	15	
Ret	10	(Spain) Fonsi Nieto	Kawasaki ZX 10R	17	Retirement	10	
Ret	13	(Italy) Vittorio Iannuzzo	Ducati 999 F05	14	Retirement	24	
Ret	38	(Japan) Shinichi Nakatomi	Yamaha YZF R1	12	Retirement	14	
Ret	18	(United Kingdom) Craig Jones	Petronas FP1	9	Retirement	25	
Ret	8	(Italy) Ivan Clementi	Ducati 999 RS	7	Retirement	20	
Ret	99	(Australia) Steve Martin	Petronas FP1	7	Retirement	21	
Ret	12	(Italy) Ivan Goi	Honda CBR1000RR	5	Retirement	26	
Ret	36	(Czech Republic) Jiří Dražďák	Yamaha YZF R1	0	Retirement	27	
Ret	80	(United States) Kurtis Roberts	Ducati 999 RS	0	Retirement	23	

=== Supersport race classification ===
Pos	No	Rider	Bike	Laps	Time	Grid	Points
1	16	(France) Sébastien Charpentier	Honda CBR600RR	22	38:14.775	1	25
2	54	(Turkey) Kenan Sofuoğlu	Honda CBR600RR	22	+3.779	2	20
3	23	(Australia) Broc Parkes	Yamaha YZF-R6	22	+10.879	3	16
4	69	(Italy) Gianluca Nannelli	Ducati 749R	22	+19.556	7	13
5	94	(Spain) David Checa	Yamaha YZF-R6	22	+22.790	4	11
6	127	(Denmark) Robbin Harms	Honda CBR600RR	22	+25.745	11	10
7	3	(Japan) Katsuaki Fujiwara	Honda CBR600RR	22	+29.437	6	9
8	116	(Sweden) Johan Stigefelt	Honda CBR600RR	22	+31.609	9	8
9	7	(France) Stéphane Chambon	Kawasaki ZX-6R	22	+35.190	10	7
10	32	(France) Yoann Tiberio	Honda CBR600RR	22	+37.552	20	6
11	61	(Italy) Simone Sanna	Honda CBR600RR	22	+52.996	16	5
12	6	(Italy) Mauro Sanchini	Yamaha YZF-R6	22	+55.346	14	4
13	38	(France) Grégory Leblanc	Honda CBR600RR	22	+55.462	24	3
14	72	(United Kingdom) Stuart Easton	Ducati 749R	22	+59.631	29	2
15	31	(Finland) Vesa Kallio	Yamaha YZF-R6	22	+1:04.252	25	1
16	17	(Portugal) Miguel Praia	Honda CBR600RR	22	+1:04.435	27	
17	5	(Italy) Alessio Velini	Yamaha YZF-R6	22	+1:05.829	26	
18	27	(United Kingdom) Tom Tunstall	Honda CBR600RR	22	+1:19.115	31	
19	28	(Netherlands) Arie Vos	Honda CBR600RR	22	+1:25.456	28	
20	40	(France) Thomas Metro	Yamaha YZF-R6	22	+1:32.029	36	
Ret	45	(Italy) Gianluca Vizziello	Yamaha YZF-R6	21	Retirement	12	
Ret	37	(San Marino) William De Angelis	Honda CBR600RR	16	Technical problem	15	
Ret	39	(France) David Perret	Kawasaki ZX-6R	15	Accident	23	
Ret	10	(France) Fabien Foret	Kawasaki ZX-6R	14	Accident	13	
Ret	25	(Finland) Tatu Lauslehto	Honda CBR600RR	14	Retirement	35	
Ret	73	(Austria) Christian Zaiser	Ducati 749R	10	Retirement	21	
Ret	21	(Canada) Chris Peris	Yamaha YZF-R6	8	Technical problem	22	
Ret	34	(Belgium) Didier Van Keymeulen	Yamaha YZF-R6	8	Retirement	19	
Ret	60	(Russia) Vladimir Ivanov	Yamaha YZF-R6	8	Accident	32	
Ret	11	(Australia) Kevin Curtain	Yamaha YZF-R6	7	Accident	5	
Ret	77	(Netherlands) Barry Veneman	Suzuki GSX-R600	6	Accident	17	
Ret	22	(Norway) Kai Børre Andersen	Suzuki GSX-R600	6	Accident	18	
Ret	66	(Germany) Jesco Günther	Honda CBR600RR	2	Accident	33	
Ret	55	(Italy) Massimo Roccoli	Yamaha YZF-R6	1	Accident	8	
Ret	57	(Slovenia) Luka Nedog	Ducati 749R	0	Accident	37	
Ret	9	(Italy) Alessio Corradi	Yamaha YZF-R6	0	Accident	30	
DNS	93	(France) Stéphane Duterne	Yamaha YZF-R6	0	Did not start	34	
WD	88	(France) Julien Enjolras	Yamaha YZF-R6		Withdrew		

== Superstock 1000 race classification ==
Pos.	No.	Rider	Bike	Laps	Time/Retired	Grid	Points
1	77	(Italy) Claudio Corti	Yamaha YZF-R1	14	24:37.791	1	25
2	53	(Italy) Alessandro Polita	Suzuki GSX-R1000 K6	14	+1.975	10	20
3	15	(Italy) Matteo Baiocco	Yamaha YZF-R1	14	+2.705	5	16
4	57	(Italy) Ilario Dionisi	MV Agusta F4 1000 R	14	+6.275	4	13
5	56	(France) Emeric Jonchiere	Suzuki GSX-R1000 K6	14	+11.139	7	11
6	75	(Germany) Arne Tode	Suzuki GSX-R1000 K6	14	+11.475	8	10
7	5	(Italy) Riccardo Chiarello	Kawasaki ZX-10R	14	+11.746	12	9
8	40	(Switzerland) Hervé Gantner	Honda CBR1000RR	14	+17.334	9	8
9	24	(Slovenia) Marko Jerman	Suzuki GSX-R1000 K6	14	+18.450	17	7
10	16	(Spain) Enrique Rocamora	Yamaha YZF-R1	14	+19.786	15	6
11	32	(South Africa) Sheridan Morais	Suzuki GSX-R1000 K6	14	+22.745	11	5
12	55	(Belgium) Olivier Depoorter	Yamaha YZF-R1	14	+24.472	22	4
13	99	(Italy) Danilo Dell'Omo	Suzuki GSX-R1000 K6	14	+24.812	19	3
14	89	(Switzerland) Raphael Chevre	Suzuki GSX-R1000 K6	14	+25.927	23	2
15	71	(Norway) Petter Solli	Yamaha YZF-R1	14	+32.251	24	1
16	90	(Italy) Diego Ciavattini	Yamaha YZF-R1	14	+40.194	21	
17	35	(Netherlands) Allard Kerkhoven	Suzuki GSX-R1000 K6	14	+41.883	28	
18	73	(Italy) Simone Saltarelli	Yamaha YZF-R1	14	+44.154	25	
19	72	(France) Freddy Foray	Suzuki GSX-R1000 K6	14	+46.649	14	
20	21	(Netherlands) Leon Bovee	Suzuki GSX-R1000 K6	14	+48.014	26	
21	27	(Italy) Alessandro Colatosti	Kawasaki ZX-10R	14	+48.779	27	
22	18	(Belgium) Eric Van Bael	Suzuki GSX-R1000 K6	14	+1:15.928	30	
23	33	(United Kingdom) Patrick McDougall	Suzuki GSX-R1000 K6	14	+1:19.600	31	
Ret	34	(Republic of Ireland) Mark Pollock	Suzuki GSX-R1000 K6	10	Retirement	32	
Ret	26	(Australia) Brendan Roberts	Suzuki GSX-R1000 K6	8	Retirement	16	
Ret	58	(Italy) Robert Gianfardoni	Yamaha YZF-R1	8	Retirement	33	
Ret	9	(Italy) Luca Scassa	MV Agusta F4 1000 R	4	Technical problem	3	
Ret	76	(United Kingdom) Adam Jenkinson	Honda CBR1000RR	4	Accident	20	
Ret	31	(Italy) Giuseppe Barone	Suzuki GSX-R1000 K6	3	Retirement	29	
Ret	96	(Czech Republic) Matěj Smrž	Honda CBR1000RR	0	Accident	18	
Ret	38	(Italy) Gilles Boccolini	Kawasaki ZX-10R	0	Accident	13	
Ret	12	(Germany) Leonardo Biliotti	Suzuki GSX-R1000 K6	0	Accident	6	
Ret	86	(Italy) Ayrton Badovini	MV Agusta F4 1000 R	0	Accident	2	
DNS	47	(United Kingdom) Richard Cooper	Honda CBR1000RR		Did not start		
DNS	44	(Italy) Roberto Lunadei	Yamaha YZF-R1		Did not start		
DNS	8	(France) Loïc Napoleone	Suzuki GSX-R1000 K6		Did not start		
DNS	10	(Italy) Giuseppe Natalini	Kawasaki ZX-10R		Did not start		
WD	54	(France) Anthony Dos Santos	Yamaha YZF-R1		Withdrew		

== Superstock 600 race classification ==
Pos.	No.	Rider	Bike	Laps	Time/Retired	Grid	Points
1	19	(Belgium) Xavier Simeon	Suzuki GSX-R600	11	20:02.740	1	25
2	8	(Italy) Andrea Antonelli	Honda CBR600RR	11	+4.284	2	20
3	89	(Italy) Domenico Colucci	Ducati 749R	11	+7.266	4	16
4	77	(United Kingdom) Barry Burrell	Honda CBR600RR	11	+9.275	9	13
5	21	(France) Franck Millet	Yamaha YZF-R6	11	+14.176	12	11
6	99	(Netherlands) Roy Ten Napel	Yamaha YZF-R6	11	+14.337	6	10
7	88	(Norway) Mads Odin Hodt	Yamaha YZF-R6	11	+15.998	7	9
8	30	(Switzerland) Michaël Savary	Yamaha YZF-R6	11	+18.236	10	8
9	37	(Poland) Andrzej Chmielewski	Yamaha YZF-R6	11	+28.656	14	7
10	18	(United Kingdom) Matt Bond	Suzuki GSX-R600	11	+29.230	16	6
11	16	(United Kingdom) Christopher Northover	Suzuki GSX-R600	11	+31.681	25	5
12	84	(Slovenia) Boštjan Pintar	Yamaha YZF-R6	11	+32.561	19	4
13	55	(Belgium) Vincent Lonbois	Suzuki GSX-R600	11	+42.712	21	3
14	25	(Czech Republic) Patrik Vostárek	Honda CBR600RR	11	+44.828	26	2
15	56	(Switzerland) Daniel Sutter	Honda CBR600RR	11	+47.315	24	1
16	28	(Spain) Yannick Guerra	Yamaha YZF-R6	11	+53.706	27	
17	45	(Italy) Daniele Rossi	Kawasaki ZX-6R	11	+53.954	30	
18	58	(Switzerland) Gabriel Berclaz	Yamaha YZF-R6	11	+59.792	29	
19	49	(Italy) Davide Bastianelli	Yamaha YZF-R6	11	+1:03.473	23	
20	50	(France) Jordan Pernoud	Yamaha YZF-R6	11	+1:31.424	32	
21	34	(Sweden) Alexander Lundh	Honda CBR600RR	11	+1:36.630	8	
22	24	(Italy) Daniele Beretta	Suzuki GSX-R600	10	+1 lap	17	
Ret	75	(Germany) Dennis Sigloch	Yamaha YZF-R6	10	Accident	11	
Ret	10	(Italy) Davide Giugliano	Kawasaki ZX-6R	9	Accident	3	
Ret	48	(Poland) Marcin Walkowiak	Yamaha YZF-R6	8	Accident	33	
Ret	12	(Italy) Davide Caldart	Kawasaki ZX-6R	7	Retirement	34	
Ret	74	(France) Sylvain Barrier	Yamaha YZF-R6	6	Accident	5	
Ret	41	(Switzerland) Gregory Junod	Suzuki GSX-R600	5	Accident	15	
Ret	52	(France) Mathieu Lussiana	Yamaha YZF-R6	2	Retirement	13	
Ret	36	(Italy) Jarno Colosio	Yamaha YZF-R6	2	Retirement	28	
Ret	51	(France) Julien Millet	Yamaha YZF-R6	1	Accident	18	
Ret	31	(Netherlands) Lennart Van Houwelingen	Suzuki GSX-R600	1	Accident	22	
Ret	26	(United States) Will Gruy	Yamaha YZF-R6	1	Accident	20	
DNS	69	(Czech Republic) Ondřej Ježek	Kawasaki ZX-6R	0	Did not start	31	
WD	7	(Italy) Renato Costantini	Honda CBR600RR		Withdrew		
WD	46	(United Kingdom) Leon Hunt	Yamaha YZF-R6		Withdrew		
WD	47	(Italy) Eddi La Marra	Yamaha YZF-R6		Withdrew		
