= 2007 Misano Superbike World Championship round =

(Italy) 2007 Misano Superbike World Championship round
Round details
- Round 8 of 13 rounds in the 2007 Superbike World Championship. and Round 8 of 13 rounds in the 2007 Supersport World Championship.
- Date: June 17, 2007
- Location: Misano
- Course: Permanent racing facility 4.180 km (2.597 mi)

Superbike World Championship
Pole position
(Australia) Troy Corser
1:34.948
| Fastest lap race 1 | Fastest lap race 2 |
| (Japan) Noriyuki Haga | (Australia) Troy Bayliss |
| 1:36.356 | 1:36.022 |

Supersport World Championship
Pole position
(Australia) Broc Parkes
1:39.156
Fastest lap
(Australia) Anthony West
1:39.109

The 2007 Misano Superbike World Championship round was the eighth round of the 2007 Superbike World Championship. It took place on the weekend of June 15–17, 2007 at the Misano Adriatico circuit.

== Superbike race 1 classification ==
| Pos | No | Rider | Bike | Laps | Time | Grid | Points |
|---|---|---|---|---|---|---|---|
| 1 | 21 | (Australia) Troy Bayliss | Ducati 999 F07 | 24 | 38:52.856 | 2 | 25 |
| 2 | 11 | (Australia) Troy Corser | Yamaha YZF-R1 | 24 | +2.374 | 1 | 20 |
| 3 | 71 | (Japan) Yukio Kagayama | Suzuki GSX-R1000 K7 | 24 | +8.965 | 8 | 16 |
| 4 | 52 | (United Kingdom) James Toseland | Honda CBR1000RR | 24 | +11.110 | 4 | 13 |
| 5 | 44 | (Italy) Roberto Rolfo | Honda CBR1000RR | 24 | +18.709 | 9 | 11 |
| 6 | 57 | (Italy) Lorenzo Lanzi | Ducati 999 F07 | 24 | +20.467 | 6 | 10 |
| 7 | 55 | (France) Régis Laconi | Kawasaki ZX-10R | 24 | +22.072 | 11 | 9 |
| 8 | 111 | (Spain) Rubén Xaus | Ducati 999 F06 | 24 | +25.424 | 7 | 8 |
| 9 | 76 | (Germany) Max Neukirchner | Suzuki GSX-R1000 K6 | 24 | +30.891 | 10 | 7 |
| 10 | 96 | (Czech Republic) Jakub Smrž | Ducati 999 F05 | 24 | +37.724 | 16 | 6 |
| 11 | 20 | (Italy) Marco Borciani | Ducati 999 F06 | 24 | +44.898 | 13 | 5 |
| 12 | 92 | (Italy) Mauro Sanchini | Kawasaki ZX-10R | 24 | +1:01.538 | 17 | 4 |
| 13 | 22 | (Italy) Luca Morelli | Honda CBR1000RR | 24 | +1:37.781 | 19 | 3 |
| 14 | 42 | (United Kingdom) Dean Ellison | Ducati 999RS | 23 | +1 lap | 22 | 2 |
| 15 | 73 | (Austria) Christian Zaiser | MV Agusta F4 312 R | 23 | +1 lap | 21 | 1 |
| Ret | 41 | (Japan) Noriyuki Haga | Yamaha YZF-R1 | 21 | Retirement | 3 | |
| Ret | 3 | (Italy) Max Biaggi | Suzuki GSX-R1000 K7 | 21 | Retirement | 5 | |
| Ret | 10 | (Spain) Fonsi Nieto | Kawasaki ZX-10R | 14 | Retirement | 15 | |
| Ret | 34 | (Italy) Luca Conforti | Honda CBR1000RR | 10 | Retirement | 18 | |
| Ret | 38 | (Japan) Shinichi Nakatomi | Yamaha YZF-R1 | 6 | Retirement | 14 | |
| Ret | 53 | (Italy) Alex Polita | Suzuki GSX-R1000 K6 | 5 | Retirement | 20 | |
| Ret | 84 | (Italy) Michel Fabrizio | Honda CBR1000RR | 4 | Retirement | 12 | |

== Superbike race 2 classification ==
| Pos | No | Rider | Bike | Laps | Time | Grid | Points |
|---|---|---|---|---|---|---|---|
| 1 | 21 | (Australia) Troy Bayliss | Ducati 999 F07 | 24 | 38:43.506 | 2 | 25 |
| 2 | 41 | (Japan) Noriyuki Haga | Yamaha YZF-R1 | 24 | +2.537 | 3 | 20 |
| 3 | 3 | (Italy) Max Biaggi | Suzuki GSX-R1000 K7 | 24 | +6.386 | 5 | 16 |
| 4 | 71 | (Japan) Yukio Kagayama | Suzuki GSX-R1000 K7 | 24 | +8.905 | 8 | 13 |
| 5 | 11 | (Australia) Troy Corser | Yamaha YZF-R1 | 24 | +9.130 | 1 | 11 |
| 6 | 52 | (United Kingdom) James Toseland | Honda CBR1000RR | 24 | +13.967 | 4 | 10 |
| 7 | 111 | (Spain) Rubén Xaus | Ducati 999 F06 | 24 | +16.708 | 7 | 9 |
| 8 | 44 | (Italy) Roberto Rolfo | Honda CBR1000RR | 24 | +16.781 | 9 | 8 |
| 9 | 57 | (Italy) Lorenzo Lanzi | Ducati 999 F07 | 24 | +17.312 | 6 | 7 |
| 10 | 76 | (Germany) Max Neukirchner | Suzuki GSX-R1000 K6 | 24 | +33.065 | 10 | 6 |
| 11 | 55 | (France) Régis Laconi | Kawasaki ZX-10R | 24 | +33.605 | 11 | 5 |
| 12 | 10 | (Spain) Fonsi Nieto | Kawasaki ZX-10R | 24 | +41.251 | 15 | 4 |
| 13 | 96 | (Czech Republic) Jakub Smrž | Ducati 999 F05 | 24 | +42.723 | 16 | 3 |
| 14 | 38 | (Japan) Shinichi Nakatomi | Yamaha YZF-R1 | 24 | +56.644 | 14 | 2 |
| 15 | 92 | (Italy) Mauro Sanchini | Kawasaki ZX-10R | 24 | +1:00.739 | 17 | 1 |
| 16 | 34 | (Italy) Luca Conforti | Honda CBR1000RR | 24 | +1:16.641 | 18 | |
| 17 | 53 | (Italy) Alex Polita | Suzuki GSX-R1000 K6 | 24 | +1:17.714 | 20 | |
| 18 | 22 | (Italy) Luca Morelli | Honda CBR1000RR | 24 | +1:34.886 | 19 | |
| 19 | 42 | (United Kingdom) Dean Ellison | Ducati 999RS | 23 | +1 lap | 22 | |
| Ret | 20 | (Italy) Marco Borciani | Ducati 999 F06 | 15 | Retirement | 13 | |
| Ret | 73 | (Austria) Christian Zaiser | MV Agusta F4 312 R | 11 | Retirement | 21 | |
| Ret | 84 | (Italy) Michel Fabrizio | Honda CBR1000RR | 2 | Retirement | 12 | |

== Supersport race classification ==
| Pos | No | Rider | Bike | Laps | Time | Grid | Points |
|---|---|---|---|---|---|---|---|
| 1 | 14 | (Australia) Anthony West | Yamaha YZF-R6 | 22 | 36:47.866 | 2 | 25 |
| 2 | 23 | (Australia) Broc Parkes | Yamaha YZF-R6 | 22 | +4.197 | 1 | 20 |
| 3 | 54 | (Turkey) Kenan Sofuoğlu | Honda CBR600RR | 22 | +4.340 | 4 | 16 |
| 4 | 55 | (Italy) Massimo Roccoli | Yamaha YZF-R6 | 22 | +15.123 | 10 | 13 |
| 5 | 127 | (Denmark) Robbin Harms | Honda CBR600RR | 22 | +18.429 | 11 | 11 |
| 6 | 116 | (Italy) Simone Sanna | Honda CBR600RR | 22 | +18.741 | 6 | 10 |
| 7 | 12 | (Spain) Javier Forés | Honda CBR600RR | 22 | +18.915 | 16 | 9 |
| 8 | 21 | (Japan) Katsuaki Fujiwara | Honda CBR600RR | 22 | +25.082 | 7 | 8 |
| 9 | 45 | (Italy) Gianluca Vizziello | Yamaha YZF-R6 | 22 | +30.240 | 12 | 7 |
| 10 | 16 | (France) Sébastien Charpentier | Honda CBR600RR | 22 | +31.633 | 9 | 6 |
| 11 | 32 | (France) Yoann Tiberio | Honda CBR600RR | 22 | +32.743 | 13 | 5 |
| 12 | 81 | (France) Matthieu Lagrive | Honda CBR600RR | 22 | +33.093 | 18 | 4 |
| 13 | 77 | (Netherlands) Barry Veneman | Suzuki GSX-R600 | 22 | +33.592 | 21 | 3 |
| 14 | 194 | (France) Sébastien Gimbert | Yamaha YZF-R6 | 22 | +35.678 | 24 | 2 |
| 15 | 35 | (Italy) Gilles Boccolini | Kawasaki ZX-6R | 22 | +37.193 | 22 | 1 |
| 16 | 4 | (Italy) Lorenzo Alfonsi | Honda CBR600RR | 22 | +39.207 | 19 | |
| 17 | 26 | (Spain) Joan Lascorz | Honda CBR600RR | 22 | +45.219 | 20 | |
| 18 | 38 | (France) Gregory Leblanc | Honda CBR600RR | 22 | +58.490 | 28 | |
| 19 | 80 | (Italy) Alessandro Brannetti | Yamaha YZF-R6 | 22 | +58.661 | 29 | |
| 20 | 60 | (Russia) Vladimir Ivanov | Yamaha YZF-R6 | 22 | +58.915 | 25 | |
| 21 | 17 | (Portugal) Miguel Praia | Honda CBR600RR | 22 | +59.837 | 30 | |
| 22 | 169 | (France) Julien Enjolras | Yamaha YZF-R6 | 22 | +1:15.406 | 34 | |
| 23 | 196 | (Germany) Sascha Hommel | Honda CBR600RR | 22 | +1:32.624 | 33 | |
| 24 | 39 | (Spain) David Forner | Yamaha YZF-R6 | 22 | +1:55.185 | 36 | |
| 25 | 88 | (Hungary) Gergő Talmácsi | Yamaha YZF-R6 | 21 | +1 lap | 37 | |
| Ret | 34 | (Italy) Davide Giugliano | Kawasaki ZX-6R | 17 | Retirement | 17 | |
| Ret | 37 | (San Marino) William De Angelis | Honda CBR600RR | 16 | Retirement | 27 | |
| Ret | 94 | (Spain) David Checa | Yamaha YZF-R6 | 10 | Retirement | 26 | |
| Ret | 73 | (Austria) Yves Polzer | Ducati 749R | 8 | Technical problem | 31 | |
| Ret | 7 | (Spain) Pere Riba | Kawasaki ZX-6R | 7 | Retirement | 8 | |
| Ret | 46 | (Germany) Jesco Günther | Honda CBR600RR | 7 | Retirement | 32 | |
| Ret | 31 | (Finland) Vesa Kallio | Suzuki GSX-R600 | 6 | Technical problem | 23 | |
| Ret | 112 | (Italy) Stefano Cruciani | Honda CBR600RR | 4 | Accident | 15 | |
| Ret | 44 | (Spain) David Salom | Yamaha YZF-R6 | 4 | Accident | 14 | |
| Ret | 100 | (Italy) Alessio Brugnoni | Ducati 749R | 4 | Accident | 35 | |
| Ret | 18 | (United Kingdom) Craig Jones | Honda CBR600RR | 3 | Technical problem | 5 | |
| Ret | 9 | (France) Fabien Foret | Kawasaki ZX-6R | 3 | Accident | 3 | |

== Superstock 1000 race classification ==
| Pos | No | Rider | Bike | Laps | Time | Grid | Points |
|---|---|---|---|---|---|---|---|
| 1 | 15 | (Italy) Matteo Baiocco | Yamaha YZF-R1 | 9 | 15:06.692 | 1 | 25 |
| 2 | 19 | (Belgium) Xavier Simeon | Suzuki GSX-R1000 K6 | 9 | +0.581 | 2 | 20 |
| 3 | 57 | (Italy) Ilario Dionisi | Suzuki GSX-R1000 K6 | 9 | +10.969 | 6 | 16 |
| 4 | 71 | (Italy) Claudio Corti | Yamaha YZF-R1 | 9 | +12.790 | 9 | 13 |
| 5 | 59 | (Italy) Niccolò Canepa | Ducati 1098S | 9 | +13.188 | 10 | 11 |
| 6 | 32 | (South Africa) Sheridan Morais | Ducati 1098S | 9 | +13.527 | 18 | 10 |
| 7 | 3 | (Australia) Mark Aitchison | Suzuki GSX-R1000 K6 | 9 | +14.415 | 7 | 9 |
| 8 | 56 | (Switzerland) Daniel Sutter | Yamaha YZF-R1 | 9 | +17.010 | 13 | 8 |
| 9 | 44 | (Austria) René Mähr | Yamaha YZF-R1 | 9 | +17.015 | 12 | 7 |
| 10 | 155 | (Australia) Brendan Roberts | Ducati 1098S | 9 | +18.154 | 14 | 6 |
| 11 | 49 | (Germany) Arne Tode | Honda CBR1000RR | 9 | +19.638 | 8 | 5 |
| 12 | 42 | (Italy) Leonardo Biliotti | MV Agusta F4 312 R | 9 | +23.353 | 11 | 4 |
| 13 | 51 | (Italy) Michele Pirro | Yamaha YZF-R1 | 9 | +23.435 | 19 | 3 |
| 14 | 96 | (Czech Republic) Matěj Smrž | Honda CBR1000RR | 9 | +28.126 | 20 | 2 |
| 15 | 55 | (Belgium) Olivier Depoorter | Yamaha YZF-R1 | 9 | +30.456 | 29 | 1 |
| 16 | 33 | (Estonia) Marko Rohtlaan | Honda CBR1000RR | 9 | +31.975 | 23 | |
| 17 | 16 | (Netherlands) Raymond Schouten | Yamaha YZF-R1 | 9 | +32.357 | 22 | |
| 18 | 10 | (France) Franck Millet | MV Agusta F4 312 R | 9 | +36.254 | 26 | |
| 19 | 23 | (France) Cédric Tangre | Yamaha YZF-R1 | 9 | +37.236 | 17 | |
| 20 | 11 | (Italy) Denis Sacchetti | MV Agusta F4 312 R | 9 | +37.699 | 21 | |
| 21 | 43 | (Italy) Enrico Sirch | Honda CBR1000RR | 9 | +39.435 | 16 | |
| 22 | 21 | (Belgium) Wim Van Den Broeck | Yamaha YZF-R1 | 9 | +40.992 | 32 | |
| 23 | 88 | (Germany) Timo Gieseler | Yamaha YZF-R1 | 9 | +42.128 | 24 | |
| 24 | 18 | (United Kingdom) Matt Bond | Suzuki GSX-R1000 K6 | 9 | +42.188 | 28 | |
| 25 | 25 | (Italy) Dario Giuseppetti | Yamaha YZF-R1 | 9 | +43.525 | 27 | |
| 26 | 24 | (Italy) Marko Jerman | Yamaha YZF-R1 | 9 | +44.298 | 30 | |
| 27 | 92 | (Netherlands) Ronald Ter Braake | Honda CBR1000RR | 9 | +45.888 | 25 | |
| 28 | 134 | (South Africa) Greg Gildenhuys | Ducati 1098S | 9 | +49.535 | 37 | |
| 29 | 34 | (Hungary) Balázs Németh | Suzuki GSX-R1000 K6 | 9 | +51.331 | 33 | |
| 30 | 13 | (Hungary) Victor Kispataki | Suzuki GSX-R1000 K6 | 9 | +52.282 | 35 | |
| 31 | 37 | (Italy) Raffaele Filice | Suzuki GSX-R1000 K6 | 9 | +54.703 | 36 | |
| Ret | 312 | (Italy) Luca Scassa | MV Agusta F4 312 R | 6 | Accident | 4 | |
| Ret | 14 | (Italy) Lorenzo Baroni | Ducati 1098S | 6 | Accident | 5 | |
| Ret | 99 | (Italy) Danilo Dell'Omo | MV Agusta F4 312 R | 3 | Accident | 15 | |
| Ret | 86 | (Italy) Ayrton Badovini | MV Agusta F4 312 R | 3 | Retirement | 3 | |
| Ret | 29 | (Italy) Niccolò Rosso | Ducati 1098S | 3 | Accident | 34 | |
| Ret | 58 | (Italy) Robert Gianfardoni | Yamaha YZF-R1 | 3 | Accident | 38 | |
| Ret | 77 | (United Kingdom) Barry Burrell | Honda CBR1000RR | 0 | Retirement | 31 | |
| DNS | 75 | (Slovenia) Luka Nedog | Ducati 1098S | | Did not start | | |
| DNS | 4 | (France) Loïc Napoleone | MV Agusta F4 312 R | | Did not start | | |

=== STK600 race classification ===
| Pos. | No. | Rider | Bike | Laps | Time/Retired | Grid | Points |
|---|---|---|---|---|---|---|---|
| 1 | 21 | (France) Maxime Berger | Yamaha YZF-R6 | 10 | 17:04.734 | 2 | 25 |
| 2 | 119 | (Italy) Michele Magnoni | Yamaha YZF-R6 | 10 | +0.596 | 1 | 20 |
| 3 | 29 | (Italy) Marco Bussolotti | Yamaha YZF-R6 | 10 | +7.742 | 5 | 16 |
| 4 | 37 | (Italy) Giuliano Gregorini | Yamaha YZF-R6 | 10 | +7.903 | 3 | 13 |
| 5 | 8 | (Italy) Andrea Antonelli | Honda CBR600RR | 10 | +8.293 | 4 | 11 |
| 6 | 57 | (Denmark) Kenny Tirsgaard | Suzuki GSX-R600 | 10 | +14.342 | 12 | 10 |
| 7 | 7 | (Italy) Renato Costantini | Honda CBR600RR | 10 | +14.711 | 11 | 9 |
| 8 | 75 | (Italy) Dennis Sigloch | Yamaha YZF-R6 | 10 | +14.950 | 14 | 8 |
| 9 | 24 | (Italy) Daniele Beretta | Suzuki GSX-R600 | 10 | +15.423 | 10 | 7 |
| 10 | 30 | (Switzerland) Michaël Savary | Yamaha YZF-R6 | 10 | +18.944 | 17 | 6 |
| 11 | 99 | (Netherlands) Roy Ten Napel | Yamaha YZF-R6 | 10 | +19.259 | 7 | 5 |
| 12 | 81 | (Czech Republic) Patrik Vostárek | Honda CBR600RR | 10 | +19.289 | 15 | 4 |
| 13 | 111 | (Czech Republic) Michal Šembera | Honda CBR600RR | 10 | +28.474 | 16 | 3 |
| 14 | 55 | (Belgium) Vincent Lonbois | Suzuki GSX-R600 | 10 | +28.793 | 20 | 2 |
| 15 | 44 | (United Kingdom) Gino Rea | Suzuki GSX-R600 | 10 | +30.060 | 26 | 1 |
| 16 | 88 | (Italy) Gianluca Capitini | Yamaha YZF-R6 | 10 | +34.412 | 23 | |
| 17 | 43 | (Italy) Daniele Rossi | Honda CBR600RR | 10 | +34.970 | 18 | |
| 18 | 22 | (Italy) Gabriele Poma | Yamaha YZF-R6 | 10 | +35.169 | 19 | |
| 19 | 47 | (Italy) Eddi La Marra | Honda CBR600RR | 10 | +35.684 | 22 | |
| 20 | 41 | (Switzerland) Gregory Junod | Kawasaki ZX-6R | 10 | +36.263 | 21 | |
| 21 | 48 | (Russia) Vladimir Leonov | Yamaha YZF-R6 | 10 | +39.948 | 27 | |
| 22 | 72 | (United Kingdom) Alex Gault | Suzuki GSX-R600 | 10 | +40.742 | 25 | |
| 23 | 28 | (Spain) Yannick Guerra | Yamaha YZF-R6 | 10 | +46.310 | 28 | |
| 24 | 10 | (United Kingdom) Leon Hunt | Honda CBR600RR | 10 | +51.344 | 24 | |
| 25 | 26 | (South Africa) Ronan Quarmby | Kawasaki ZX-6R | 10 | +1:14.274 | 32 | |
| 26 | 25 | (Australia) Ryan Taylor | Kawasaki ZX-6R | 10 | +1:14.443 | 30 | |
| 27 | 65 | (Slovakia) Tomáš Svitok | Kawasaki ZX-6R | 10 | +1:14.771 | 31 | |
| Ret | 114 | (Belgium) Nicolas Pirot | Yamaha YZF-R6 | 8 | Accident | 29 | |
| Ret | 32 | (Italy) Danilo Petrucci | Yamaha YZF-R6 | 6 | Accident | 13 | |
| Ret | 89 | (Italy) Domenico Colucci | Ducati 749R | 3 | Retirement | 8 | |
| Ret | 20 | (France) Sylvain Barrier | Yamaha YZF-R6 | 1 | Accident | 6 | |
| Ret | 4 | (France) Mathieu Gines | Yamaha YZF-R6 | 0 | Accident | 9 | |
| DNS | 66 | (Netherlands) Branko Srdanov | Yamaha YZF-R6 | | Did not start | | |
| WD | 35 | (Bulgaria) Radostin Todorov | Yamaha YZF-R6 | | Withdrew | | |
| WD | 112 | (Spain) Josep Pedró | Yamaha YZF-R6 | | Withdrew | | |
| WD | 199 | (United Kingdom) Gregg Black | Yamaha YZF-R6 | | Withdrew | | |
