= 2007 Assen Superbike World Championship round =

(Netherlands) 2007 Dutch Superbike World Championship round
Round details
- Round 5 of 13 rounds in the 2007 Superbike World Championship. and Round 5 of 13 rounds in the 2007 Supersport World Championship.
- Date: April 29, 2007
- Location: Assen
- Course: Permanent racing facility 4.555 km (2.830 mi)

Superbike World Championship
Pole position
(United Kingdom) James Toseland
1:38.603
Fastest lap race 1	Fastest lap race 2
(Australia) Troy Bayliss	(Japan) Noriyuki Haga
1:39.906	1:39.770

Supersport World Championship
Pole position
(Turkey) Kenan Sofuoğlu
1:41.144
Fastest lap
(Turkey) Kenan Sofuoğlu
1:42.096

The 2007 Assen Superbike World Championship round was the fifth round of the 2007 Superbike World Championship. It took place on the weekend of April 27–29, 2007, at the 4.555 km TT Circuit Assen in the Netherlands.

== Superbike race 1 classification ==
Pos	No.	Rider	Bike	Laps	Time	Grid	Points
1	52	(United Kingdom) James Toseland	Honda CBR1000RR	22	37:02.097	1	25
2	41	(Japan) Noriyuki Haga	Yamaha YZF-R1	22	+0.663	15	20
3	111	(Spain) Rubén Xaus	Ducati 999 F06	22	+3.698	5	16
4	21	(Australia) Troy Bayliss	Ducati 999 F07	22	+7.134	3	13
5	57	(Italy) Lorenzo Lanzi	Ducati 999 F07	22	+9.312	2	11
6	3	(Italy) Max Biaggi	Suzuki GSX-R1000 K7	22	+9.534	4	10
7	71	(Japan) Yukio Kagayama	Suzuki GSX-R1000 K7	22	+18.286	8	9
8	10	(Spain) Fonsi Nieto	Kawasaki ZX-10R	22	+18.403	10	8
9	44	(Italy) Roberto Rolfo	Honda CBR1000RR	22	+19.873	11	7
10	76	(Germany) Max Neukirchner	Suzuki GSX-R1000 K6	22	+22.914	7	6
11	96	(Czech Republic) Jakub Smrž	Ducati 999 F05	22	+29.602	12	5
12	84	(Italy) Michel Fabrizio	Honda CBR1000RR	22	+40.961	16	4
13	38	(Japan) Shinichi Nakatomi	Yamaha YZF-R1	22	+41.008	17	3
14	42	(United Kingdom) Dean Ellison	Ducati 999RS	22	+1:12.714	19	2
15	85	(Czech Republic) Marek Svoboda	Yamaha YZF-R1	20	+2 laps	21	1
16	55	(France) Régis Laconi	Kawasaki ZX-10R	20	+2 laps	13	
Ret	11	(Australia) Troy Corser	Yamaha YZF-R1	20	Retirement	6	
Ret	31	(Australia) Karl Muggeridge	Honda CBR1000RR	10	Retirement	9	
Ret	25	(Australia) Josh Brookes	Honda CBR1000RR	8	Retirement	14	
Ret	22	(Italy) Luca Morelli	Ducati 999RS	0	Retirement	20	
Ret	73	(Austria) Christian Zaiser	MV Agusta F4 312 R	0	Retirement	18	

== Superbike race 2 classification ==
Pos	No.	Rider	Bike	Laps	Time	Grid	Points
1	21	(Australia) Troy Bayliss	Ducati 999 F07	22	36:54.133	3	25
2	52	(United Kingdom) James Toseland	Honda CBR1000RR	22	+0.009	1	20
3	3	(Italy) Max Biaggi	Suzuki GSX-R1000 K7	22	+7.439	4	16
4	11	(Australia) Troy Corser	Yamaha YZF-R1	22	+12.379	6	13
5	44	(Italy) Roberto Rolfo	Honda CBR1000RR	22	+23.052	11	11
6	84	(Italy) Michel Fabrizio	Honda CBR1000RR	22	+23.158	16	10
7	76	(Germany) Max Neukirchner	Suzuki GSX-R1000 K6	22	+23.311	7	9
8	10	(Spain) Fonsi Nieto	Kawasaki ZX-10R	22	+24.147	10	8
9	96	(Czech Republic) Jakub Smrž	Ducati 999 F05	22	+29.660	12	7
10	55	(France) Régis Laconi	Kawasaki ZX-10R	22	+32.301	13	6
11	71	(Japan) Yukio Kagayama	Suzuki GSX-R1000 K7	22	+32.389	8	5
12	38	(Japan) Shinichi Nakatomi	Yamaha YZF-R1	22	+39.091	17	4
13	25	(Australia) Josh Brookes	Honda CBR1000RR	22	+39.128	14	3
14	22	(Italy) Luca Morelli	Ducati 999RS	21	+1 lap	20	2
15	85	(Czech Republic) Marek Svoboda	Yamaha YZF-R1	21	+1 lap	21	1
16	42	(United Kingdom) Dean Ellison	Ducati 999RS	19	+3 laps	19	
Ret	57	(Italy) Lorenzo Lanzi	Ducati 999 F07	18	Retirement	2	
Ret	31	(Australia) Karl Muggeridge	Honda CBR1000RR	16	Retirement	9	
Ret	41	(Japan) Noriyuki Haga	Yamaha YZF-R1	10	Retirement	15	
Ret	111	(Spain) Rubén Xaus	Ducati 999 F06	3	Retirement	5	

== Supersport classification ==
Pos.	No.	Rider	Bike	Laps	Time/Retired	Grid	Points
1	54	(Turkey) Kenan Sofuoğlu	Honda CBR600RR	21	36:04.418	1	25
2	15	(Australia) Andrew Pitt	Honda CBR600RR	21	+4.043	7	20
3	9	(France) Fabien Foret	Kawasaki ZX-6R	21	+5.479	4	16
4	77	(Netherlands) Barry Veneman	Suzuki GSX-R600	21	+8.140	13	13
5	44	(Spain) David Salom	Yamaha YZF-R6	21	+8.900	9	11
6	16	(France) Sébastien Charpentier	Honda CBR600RR	21	+11.090	2	10
7	94	(Spain) David Checa	Yamaha YZF-R6	21	+14.847	14	9
8	31	(Finland) Vesa Kallio	Suzuki GSX-R600	21	+19.545	11	8
9	34	(Italy) Davide Giugliano	Kawasaki ZX-6R	21	+19.880	15	7
10	99	(Australia) Steve Martin	Yamaha YZF-R6	21	+20.084	6	6
11	4	(Italy) Lorenzo Alfonsi	Honda CBR600RR	21	+21.940	18	5
12	7	(Spain) Pere Riba	Kawasaki ZX-6R	21	+26.792	12	4
13	116	(Italy) Simone Sanna	Honda CBR600RR	21	+36.477	26	3
14	55	(Italy) Massimo Roccoli	Yamaha YZF-R6	21	+37.156	5	2
15	28	(Netherlands) Arie Vos	Honda CBR600RR	21	+39.459	21	1
16	8	(Canada) Chris Peris	Yamaha YZF-R6	21	+39.985	25	
17	60	(Russia) Vladimir Ivanov	Yamaha YZF-R6	21	+40.163	10	
18	45	(Italy) Gianluca Vizziello	Yamaha YZF-R6	21	+41.140	24	
19	12	(Spain) Javier Forés	Honda CBR600RR	21	+45.772	20	
20	18	(United Kingdom) Craig Jones	Honda CBR600RR	21	+53.145	16	
21	29	(Netherlands) Joan Veijer	Honda CBR600RR	21	+54.061	23	
22	32	(France) Yoann Tiberio	Honda CBR600RR	21	+55.809	31	
23	25	(Finland) Tatu Lauslehto	Honda CBR600RR	21	+59.669	32	
24	169	(France) Julien Enjolras	Yamaha YZF-R6	21	+1:05.004	28	
25	46	(Germany) Jesco Günther	Honda CBR600RR	21	+1:18.881	34	
26	58	(Czech Republic) Tomáš Mikšovský	Honda CBR600RR	21	+1:29.463	33	
27	39	(Spain) David Forner	Yamaha YZF-R6	21	+1:30.432	36	
28	73	(Austria) Yves Polzer	Ducati 749R	20	+1 lap	37	
29	92	(Netherlands) Ghisbert van Ginhoven	Ducati 749R	20	+1 lap	30	
Ret	23	(Australia) Broc Parkes	Yamaha YZF-R6	19	Retirement	3	
Ret	194	(France) Sébastien Gimbert	Yamaha YZF-R6	17	Retirement	22	
Ret	17	(Portugal) Miguel Praia	Honda CBR600RR	13	Retirement	27	
Ret	96	(Sweden) Nikola Milovanovic	Honda CBR600RR	8	Retirement	35	
Ret	69	(Italy) Gianluca Nannelli	Ducati 749R	2	Retirement	19	
Ret	35	(Italy) Gilles Boccolini	Kawasaki ZX-6R	2	Retirement	29	
Ret	26	(Spain) Joan Lascorz	Honda CBR600RR	0	Retirement	17	
Ret	21	(Japan) Katsuaki Fujiwara	Honda CBR600RR	0	Retirement	8	

== Superstock 1000 classification ==
Pos.	No.	Rider	Bike	Laps	Time/Retired	Grid	Points
1	51	(Italy) Michele Pirro	Yamaha YZF-R1	13	22:27.536	3	25
2	71	(Italy) Claudio Corti	Yamaha YZF-R1	13	+0.092	1	20
3	83	(Belgium) Didier Van Keymeulen	Yamaha YZF-R1	13	+0.513	2	16
4	57	(Italy) Ilario Dionisi	Suzuki GSX-R1000 K6	13	+9.257	7	13
5	15	(Italy) Matteo Baiocco	Yamaha YZF-R1	13	+13.319	5	11
6	59	(Italy) Niccolò Canepa	Ducati 1098S	13	+14.996	9	10
7	155	(Australia) Brendan Roberts	Ducati 1098S	13	+15.569	6	9
8	19	(Belgium) Xavier Simeon	Suzuki GSX-R1000 K6	13	+15.796	10	8
9	96	(Czech Republic) Matěj Smrž	Honda CBR1000RR	13	+19.816	13	7
10	99	(Italy) Danilo Dell'Omo	MV Agusta F4 312 R	13	+20.396	14	6
11	16	(Netherlands) Raymond Schouten	Yamaha YZF-R1	13	+27.508	15	5
12	92	(Netherlands) Ronald Ter Braake	Kawasaki ZX-10R	13	+28.404	11	4
13	44	(Austria) René Mähr	Yamaha YZF-R1	13	+30.659	19	3
14	23	(France) Cédric Tangre	Yamaha YZF-R1	13	+30.863	20	2
15	33	(Estonia) Marko Rohtlaan	Honda CBR1000RR	13	+35.346	22	1
16	25	(Italy) Dario Giuseppetti	Yamaha YZF-R1	13	+37.439	25	
17	56	(Switzerland) Daniel Sutter	Yamaha YZF-R1	13	+39.270	27	
18	34	(Hungary) Balázs Németh	Suzuki GSX-R1000 K6	13	+39.411	26	
19	5	(Netherlands) Bram Appelo	Honda CBR1000RR	13	+41.262	29	
20	10	(France) Franck Millet	MV Agusta F4 312 R	13	+41.520	33	
21	88	(Germany) Timo Gieseler	Yamaha YZF-R1	13	+41.734	23	
22	42	(Italy) Leonardo Biliotti	MV Agusta F4 312 R	13	+42.815	24	
23	77	(United Kingdom) Barry Burrell	Honda CBR1000RR	13	+46.299	32	
24	37	(Italy) Raffaele Filice	Suzuki GSX-R1000 K6	13	+55.192	34	
25	32	(South Africa) Sheridan Morais	Ducati 1098S	13	+57.843	17	
26	28	(United States) Nicky Moore	Ducati 1098S	13	+59.237	28	
27	75	(Slovenia) Luka Nedog	Ducati 1098S	13	+59.500	30	
28	13	(Hungary) Viktor Kispataki	Suzuki GSX-R1000 K6	13	+1:01.710	35	
29	21	(Belgium) Wim Van Den Broeck	Yamaha YZF-R1	13	+1:04.244	36	
30	91	(Netherlands) Danny De Boer	Suzuki GSX-R1000 K6	13	+1:11.411	32	
31	86	(Italy) Ayrton Badovini	MV Agusta F4 312 R	13	+1:16.778	4	
32	58	(Italy) Robert Gianfardoni	Yamaha YZF-R1	13	+1:27.106	38	
33	18	(United Kingdom) Matt Bond	Suzuki GSX-R1000 K6	13	+1:28.630	37	
34	29	(Italy) Niccolò Rosso	Ducati 1098S	12	+1 lap	39	
Ret	14	(Italy) Lorenzo Baroni	Ducati 1098S	12	Technical problem	18	
Ret	4	(France) Loïc Napoleone	MV Agusta F4 312 R	11	Accident	16	
Ret	49	(Germany) Arne Tode	Honda CBR1000RR	10	Accident	8	
Ret	24	(Slovenia) Marko Jerman	Yamaha YZF-R1	10	Technical problem	21	
Ret	3	(Australia) Mark Aitchison	Suzuki GSX-R1000 K6	6	Accident	12	
DNS	11	(Italy) Denis Sacchetti	Suzuki GSX-R1000 K6		Did not start		
DNS	55	(Belgium) Olivier Depoorter	Yamaha YZF-R1		Did not start		

=== STK600 race classification ===
Pos.	No.	Rider	Bike	Laps	Time/Retired	Grid	Points
1	8	(Italy) Andrea Antonelli	Honda CBR600RR	10	17:45.988	4	25
2	20	(France) Sylvain Barrier	Yamaha YZF-R6	10	+0.156	3	20
3	21	(France) Maxime Berger	Yamaha YZF-R6	10	+0.572	2	16
4	199	(United Kingdom) Gregg Black	Yamaha YZF-R6	10	+0.691	7	13
5	119	(Italy) Michele Magnoni	Yamaha YZF-R6	10	+5.776	8	11
6	99	(Netherlands) Roy Ten Napel	Yamaha YZF-R6	10	+7.373	1	10
7	30	(Switzerland) Michaël Savary	Yamaha YZF-R6	10	+7.666	11	9
8	4	(France) Mathieu Gines	Yamaha YZF-R6	10	+7.935	6	8
9	75	(Germany) Dennis Sigloch	Yamaha YZF-R6	10	+8.245	12	7
10	111	(Czech Republic) Michal Šembera	Honda CBR600RR	10	+8.459	10	6
11	24	(Italy) Daniele Beretta	Suzuki GSX-R600	10	+10.979	13	5
12	81	(Czech Republic) Patrik Vostárek	Honda CBR600RR	10	+12.181	9	4
13	112	(Spain) Josep Pedró	Yamaha YZF-R6	10	+17.887	17	3
14	31	(Italy) Giuseppe Barone	Honda CBR600RR	10	+25.874	14	2
15	41	(Switzerland) Gregory Junod	Kawasaki ZX-6R	10	+26.016	16	1
16	12	(Italy) Andrea Boscoscuro	Kawasaki ZX-6R	10	+26.189	15	
17	7	(Italy) Renato Costantini	Honda CBR600RR	10	+30.199	20	
18	47	(Italy) Eddi La Marra	Honda CBR600RR	10	+30.224	25	
19	57	(Denmark) Kenny Tirsgaard	Suzuki GSX-R600	10	+30.449	18	
20	66	(Netherlands) Branko Srdanov	Yamaha YZF-R6	10	+33.096	19	
21	22	(Italy) Gabriele Poma	Yamaha YZF-R6	10	+40.230	21	
22	55	(Belgium) Vincent Lonbois	Suzuki GSX-R600	10	+40.849	22	
23	44	(United Kingdom) Gino Rea	Suzuki GSX-R600	10	+40.998	29	
24	43	(Italy) Daniele Rossi	Honda CBR600RR	10	+41.442	24	
25	10	(United Kingdom) Leon Hunt	Honda CBR600RR	10	+41.722	23	
26	27	(South Africa) Chris Leeson	Suzuki GSX-R600	10	+42.909	27	
27	28	(Spain) Yannick Guerra	Yamaha YZF-R6	10	+47.398	30	
28	48	(Russia) Vladimir Leonov	Yamaha YZF-R6	10	+1:00.501	28	
29	61	(Netherlands) Mark Ten Napel	Yamaha YZF-R6	10	+1:13.719	31	
30	25	(Australia) Mark Taylor	Kawasaki ZX-6R	10	+1:33.895	32	
Ret	114	(Belgium) Nicolas Pirot	Yamaha YZF-R6	7	Accident	26	
Ret	89	(Italy) Domenico Colucci	Ducati 749R	1	Retirement	5	
