= 2007 Valencia Superbike World Championship round =

Sportsseason from a competition

(Spain) 2007 Spanish Superbike World Championship round
Round details
- Round 4 of 13 rounds in the 2007 Superbike World Championship. and Round 4 of 13 rounds in the 2007 Supersport World Championship.
- Date: April 15, 2007
- Location: Valencia
- Course: Permanent racing facility 4.005 km (2.489 mi)

Superbike World Championship
Pole position
(Australia) Troy Bayliss
1:51.982
| Fastest lap race 1 | Fastest lap race 2 |
| (Australia) Troy Bayliss | (Japan) Noriyuki Haga |
| 1:36.092 | 1:35.746 |

Supersport World Championship
Pole position
(Turkey) Kenan Sofuoğlu
1:37.521
Fastest lap
(Japan) Katsuaki Fujiwara
1:37.570

The 2007 Valencia Superbike World Championship round was the fourth round of the 2007 Superbike World Championship. It took place on the weekend of April 13–15, 2007 at the 4.005 km Circuit de Valencia in Spain.

== Superbike race 1 classification ==
| Pos | No | Rider | Bike | Laps | Time | Grid | Points |
|---|---|---|---|---|---|---|---|
| 1 | 111 | (Spain) Rubén Xaus | Ducati 999 F06 | 23 | 37:14.606 | 2 | 25 |
| 2 | 41 | (Japan) Noriyuki Haga | Yamaha YZF-R1 | 23 | +1.997 | 7 | 20 |
| 3 | 21 | (Australia) Troy Bayliss | Ducati 999 F07 | 23 | +6.330 | 1 | 16 |
| 4 | 11 | (Australia) Troy Corser | Yamaha YZF-R1 | 23 | +8.780 | 4 | 13 |
| 5 | 52 | (United Kingdom) James Toseland | Honda CBR1000RR | 23 | +17.040 | 5 | 11 |
| 6 | 57 | (Italy) Lorenzo Lanzi | Ducati 999 F07 | 23 | +24.272 | 6 | 10 |
| 7 | 84 | (Italy) Michel Fabrizio | Honda CBR1000RR | 23 | +25.822 | 9 | 9 |
| 8 | 3 | (Italy) Max Biaggi | Suzuki GSX-R1000 K7 | 23 | +26.087 | 12 | 8 |
| 9 | 25 | (Australia) Josh Brookes | Honda CBR1000RR | 23 | +28.778 | 3 | 7 |
| 10 | 44 | (Italy) Roberto Rolfo | Honda CBR1000RR | 23 | +32.754 | 17 | 6 |
| 11 | 55 | (France) Régis Laconi | Kawasaki ZX-10R | 23 | +37.084 | 15 | 5 |
| 12 | 76 | (Germany) Max Neukirchner | Suzuki GSX-R1000 K6 | 23 | +37.141 | 13 | 4 |
| 13 | 159 | (Italy) Giovanni Bussei | Ducati 999 F06 | 23 | +37.563 | 11 | 3 |
| 14 | 96 | (Czech Republic) Jakub Smrž | Ducati 999 F05 | 23 | +38.544 | 20 | 2 |
| 15 | 71 | (Japan) Yukio Kagayama | Suzuki GSX-R1000 K7 | 23 | +53.049 | 8 | 1 |
| Ret | 38 | (Japan) Shinichi Nakatomi | Yamaha YZF-R1 | 17 | Retirement | 18 | |
| Ret | 31 | (Australia) Karl Muggeridge | Honda CBR1000RR | 12 | Retirement | 10 | |
| Ret | 131 | (Spain) Carmelo Morales | Yamaha YZF-R1 | 12 | Retirement | 16 | |
| Ret | 22 | (Italy) Luca Morelli | Ducati 999RS | 11 | Retirement | 22 | |
| Ret | 10 | (Spain) Fonsi Nieto | Kawasaki ZX-10R | 10 | Retirement | 14 | |
| Ret | 99 | (Australia) Steve Martin | Honda CBR1000RR | 8 | Retirement | 21 | |
| Ret | 73 | (Austria) Christian Zaiser | MV Agusta F4 312 R | 3 | Retirement | 19 | |
| Ret | 42 | (United Kingdom) Dean Ellison | Ducati 999RS | 3 | Retirement | 23 | |

== Superbike race 2 classification ==
| Pos | No | Rider | Bike | Laps | Time | Grid | Points |
|---|---|---|---|---|---|---|---|
| 1 | 52 | (United Kingdom) James Toseland | Honda CBR1000RR | 23 | 37:02.596 | 5 | 25 |
| 2 | 3 | (Italy) Max Biaggi | Suzuki GSX-R1000 K7 | 23 | +0.287 | 12 | 20 |
| 3 | 41 | (Japan) Noriyuki Haga | Yamaha YZF-R1 | 23 | +0.375 | 7 | 16 |
| 4 | 111 | (Spain) Rubén Xaus | Ducati 999 F06 | 23 | +6.637 | 2 | 13 |
| 5 | 57 | (Italy) Lorenzo Lanzi | Ducati 999 F07 | 23 | +7.991 | 6 | 11 |
| 6 | 21 | (Australia) Troy Bayliss | Ducati 999 F07 | 23 | +10.210 | 1 | 10 |
| 7 | 25 | (Australia) Josh Brookes | Honda CBR1000RR | 23 | +10.861 | 3 | 9 |
| 8 | 55 | (France) Régis Laconi | Kawasaki ZX-10R | 23 | +14.366 | 15 | 8 |
| 9 | 11 | (Australia) Troy Corser | Yamaha YZF-R1 | 23 | +15.511 | 4 | 7 |
| 10 | 76 | (Germany) Max Neukirchner | Suzuki GSX-R1000 K6 | 23 | +19.716 | 13 | 6 |
| 11 | 84 | (Italy) Michel Fabrizio | Honda CBR1000RR | 23 | +25.287 | 9 | 5 |
| 12 | 44 | (Italy) Roberto Rolfo | Honda CBR1000RR | 23 | +26.437 | 17 | 4 |
| 13 | 71 | (Japan) Yukio Kagayama | Suzuki GSX-R1000 K7 | 23 | +34.992 | 8 | 3 |
| 14 | 131 | (Spain) Carmelo Morales | Yamaha YZF-R1 | 23 | +39.987 | 16 | 2 |
| 15 | 159 | (Italy) Giovanni Bussei | Ducati 999 F06 | 23 | +42.445 | 11 | 1 |
| 16 | 38 | (Japan) Shinichi Nakatomi | Yamaha YZF-R1 | 23 | +43.467 | 18 | |
| 17 | 96 | (Czech Republic) Jakub Smrž | Ducati 999 F05 | 23 | +1:08.350 | 20 | |
| Ret | 22 | (Italy) Luca Morelli | Ducati 999RS | 16 | Retirement | 22 | |
| Ret | 10 | (Spain) Fonsi Nieto | Kawasaki ZX-10R | 16 | Retirement | 14 | |
| Ret | 99 | (Australia) Steve Martin | Honda CBR1000RR | 13 | Retirement | 21 | |
| Ret | 42 | (United Kingdom) Dean Ellison | Ducati 999RS | 12 | Retirement | 23 | |
| Ret | 73 | (Austria) Christian Zaiser | MV Agusta F4 312 R | 7 | Retirement | 19 | |
| Ret | 31 | (Australia) Karl Muggeridge | Honda CBR1000RR | 0 | Retirement | 10 | |

== Supersport classification ==
| Pos. | No. | Rider | Bike | Laps | Time/Retired | Grid | Points |
|---|---|---|---|---|---|---|---|
| 1 | 54 | (Turkey) Kenan Sofuoğlu | Honda CBR600RR | 23 | 38:08.523 | 1 | 25 |
| 2 | 15 | (Australia) Andrew Pitt | Honda CBR600RR | 23 | +4.911 | 5 | 20 |
| 3 | 69 | (Italy) Gianluca Nannelli | Ducati 749R | 23 | +5.200 | 8 | 16 |
| 4 | 9 | (France) Fabien Foret | Kawasaki ZX-6R | 23 | +5.619 | 6 | 13 |
| 5 | 23 | (Australia) Broc Parkes | Yamaha YZF-R6 | 23 | +12.776 | 11 | 11 |
| 6 | 44 | (Spain) David Salom | Yamaha YZF-R6 | 23 | +14.913 | 15 | 10 |
| 7 | 55 | (Italy) Massimo Roccoli | Yamaha YZF-R6 | 23 | +15.178 | 16 | 9 |
| 8 | 26 | (Spain) Joan Lascorz | Honda CBR600RR | 23 | +25.356 | 10 | 8 |
| 9 | 31 | (Finland) Vesa Kallio | Suzuki GSX-R600 | 23 | +28.454 | 20 | 7 |
| 10 | 18 | (United Kingdom) Craig Jones | Honda CBR600RR | 23 | +29.885 | 18 | 6 |
| 11 | 45 | (Italy) Gianluca Vizziello | Yamaha YZF-R6 | 23 | +30.422 | 19 | 5 |
| 12 | 34 | (Italy) Davide Giugliano | Kawasaki ZX-6R | 23 | +30.810 | 14 | 4 |
| 13 | 4 | (Italy) Lorenzo Alfonsi | Honda CBR600RR | 23 | +31.204 | 13 | 3 |
| 14 | 94 | (Spain) David Checa | Yamaha YZF-R6 | 23 | +35.273 | 21 | 2 |
| 15 | 194 | (France) Sébastien Gimbert | Yamaha YZF-R6 | 23 | +37.610 | 24 | 1 |
| 16 | 35 | (Italy) Gilles Boccolini | Kawasaki ZX-6R | 23 | +41.628 | 22 | |
| 17 | 12 | (Spain) Javier Forés | Honda CBR600RR | 23 | +41.727 | 12 | |
| 18 | 21 | (Japan) Katsuaki Fujiwara | Honda CBR600RR | 23 | +52.600 | 2 | |
| 19 | 60 | (Russia) Vladimir Ivanov | Yamaha YZF-R6 | 23 | +59.942 | 25 | |
| 20 | 8 | (Canada) Chris Peris | Yamaha YZF-R6 | 23 | +1:00.009 | 27 | |
| 21 | 17 | (Portugal) Miguel Praia | Honda CBR600RR | 23 | +1:18.490 | 28 | |
| 22 | 82 | (Spain) Adrián Bonastre | Yamaha YZF-R6 | 22 | +1 lap | 32 | |
| 23 | 39 | (Spain) David Forner | Yamaha YZF-R6 | 22 | +1 lap | 36 | |
| 24 | 73 | (Austria) Yves Polzer | Ducati 749R | 22 | +1 lap | 34 | |
| 25 | 169 | (France) Julien Enjolras | Yamaha YZF-R6 | 21 | +2 laps | 37 | |
| 26 | 41 | (Spain) Javier Hidalgo | Honda CBR600RR | 19 | +4 laps | 35 | |
| Ret | 77 | (Netherlands) Barry Veneman | Suzuki GSX-R600 | 22 | Retirement | 7 | |
| Ret | 96 | (Sweden) Nikola Milovanovic | Honda CBR600RR | 14 | Retirement | 30 | |
| Ret | 116 | (Italy) Simone Sanna | Honda CBR600RR | 12 | Retirement | 17 | |
| Ret | 11 | (Australia) Kevin Curtain | Yamaha YZF-R6 | 8 | Retirement | 3 | |
| Ret | 7 | (Spain) Pere Riba | Kawasaki ZX-6R | 8 | Retirement | 4 | |
| Ret | 46 | (Germany) Jesco Günther | Honda CBR600RR | 5 | Retirement | 31 | |
| Ret | 25 | (Finland) Tatu Lauslehto | Honda CBR600RR | 2 | Retirement | 29 | |
| Ret | 32 | (France) Yoann Tiberio | Honda CBR600RR | 2 | Retirement | 26 | |
| DNS | 127 | (Denmark) Robbin Harms | Honda CBR600RR | 0 | Did not start | 9 | |
| DNS | 81 | (France) Matthieu Lagrive | Honda CBR600RR | 0 | Did not start | 23 | |
| DNS | 38 | (France) Grégory Leblanc | Honda CBR600RR | 0 | Did not start | 33 | |

== Superstock 1000 classification ==
| Pos. | No. | Rider | Bike | Laps | Time/Retired | Grid | Points |
|---|---|---|---|---|---|---|---|
| 1 | 3 | (Australia) Mark Aitchison | Suzuki GSX-R1000 K6 | 10 | 18:04.561 | 7 | 25 |
| 2 | 51 | (Italy) Michele Pirro | Yamaha YZF-R1 | 10 | +0.566 | 2 | 20 |
| 3 | 59 | (Italy) Niccolò Canepa | Ducati 1098S | 10 | +8.556 | 5 | 16 |
| 4 | 15 | (Italy) Matteo Baiocco | Yamaha YZF-R1 | 10 | +12.741 | 11 | 13 |
| 5 | 57 | (Italy) Ilario Dionisi | Suzuki GSX-R1000 K6 | 10 | +13.883 | 9 | 11 |
| 6 | 19 | (Belgium) Xavier Simeon | Suzuki GSX-R1000 K6 | 10 | +14.606 | 6 | 10 |
| 7 | 44 | (Austria) René Mähr | Yamaha YZF-R1 | 10 | +15.604 | 8 | 9 |
| 8 | 96 | (Czech Republic) Matěj Smrž | Honda CBR1000RR | 10 | +23.290 | 19 | 8 |
| 9 | 23 | (France) Cédric Tangre | Yamaha YZF-R1 | 10 | +25.733 | 22 | 7 |
| 10 | 24 | (Slovenia) Marko Jerman | Yamaha YZF-R1 | 10 | +26.178 | 16 | 6 |
| 11 | 71 | (Italy) Claudio Corti | Yamaha YZF-R1 | 10 | +26.428 | 3 | 5 |
| 12 | 11 | (Italy) Denis Sacchetti | MV Agusta F4 312 R | 10 | +29.667 | 12 | 4 |
| 13 | 32 | (South Africa) Sheridan Morais | Ducati 1098S | 10 | +33.732 | 18 | 3 |
| 14 | 33 | (Estonia) Marko Rohtlaan | Honda CBR1000RR | 10 | +34.541 | 24 | 2 |
| 15 | 49 | (Germany) Arne Tode | Honda CBR1000RR | 10 | +41.693 | 13 | 1 |
| 16 | 88 | (Germany) Timo Gieseler | Yamaha YZF-R1 | 10 | +46.763 | 14 | |
| 17 | 34 | (Hungary) Balázs Németh | Suzuki GSX-R1000 K6 | 10 | +47.395 | 34 | |
| 18 | 56 | (Switzerland) Daniel Sutter | Yamaha YZF-R1 | 10 | +50.922 | 35 | |
| 19 | 77 | (United Kingdom) Barry Burrell | Honda CBR1000RR | 10 | +51.901 | 29 | |
| 20 | 42 | (Germany) Leonardo Biliotti | MV Agusta F4 312 R | 10 | +55.117 | 17 | |
| 21 | 74 | (Spain) Jordi Torres | Yamaha YZF-R1 | 10 | +58.904 | 30 | |
| 22 | 75 | (Slovenia) Luka Nedog | Ducati 1098S | 10 | +1:08.381 | 28 | |
| 23 | 18 | (United Kingdom) Matt Bond | Suzuki GSX-R1000 K6 | 10 | +1:16.486 | 36 | |
| 24 | 10 | (France) Franck Millet | MV Agusta 312 R | 10 | +1:18.805 | 21 | |
| 25 | 13 | (Hungary) Victor Kispataki | Suzuki GSX-R1000 K6 | 10 | +1:21.148 | 39 | |
| 26 | 37 | (Italy) Raffaele Filice | Suzuki GSX-R1000 K6 | 10 | +1:21.917 | 25 | |
| 27 | 16 | (Netherlands) Raymond Schouten | Yamaha YZF-R1 | 10 | +1:22.017 | 26 | |
| 28 | 28 | (United States) Nicky Moore | Ducati 1098S | 10 | +1:22.739 | 33 | |
| 29 | 58 | (Italy) Robert Gianfardoni | Yamaha YZF-R1 | 10 | +1:33.131 | 37 | |
| 30 | 5 | (Netherlands) Bram Appelo | Honda CBR1000RR | 10 | +2:09.711 | 32 | |
| Ret | 99 | (Italy) Danilo Dell'Omo | MV Agusta F4 312 R | 9 | Accident | 10 | |
| Ret | 4 | (France) Loïc Napoleone | MV Agusta F4 312 R | 9 | Retirement | 15 | |
| Ret | 14 | (Italy) Lorenzo Baroni | Ducati 1098S | 9 | Retirement | 27 | |
| Ret | 83 | (Belgium) Didier Van Keymeulen | Yamaha YZF-R1 | 8 | Accident | 4 | |
| Ret | 25 | (Italy) Dario Giuseppetti | Yamaha YZF-R1 | 8 | Retirement | 20 | |
| Ret | 86 | (Italy) Ayrton Badovini | MV Agusta F4 312 R | 5 | Accident | 1 | |
| Ret | 21 | (Belgium) Wim Van Den Broeck | Yamaha YZF-R1 | 5 | Accident | 31 | |
| Ret | 55 | (Belgium) Olivier Depoorter | Yamaha YZF-R1 | 4 | Accident | 23 | |
| Ret | 29 | (Italy) Niccolò Rosso | Ducati 1098S | 4 | Retirement | 38 | |
| WD | 155 | (Australia) Brendan Roberts | Ducati 1098S | | Withdrew | | |

=== STK600 race classification ===
| Pos. | No. | Rider | Bike | Laps | Time/Retired | Grid | Points |
|---|---|---|---|---|---|---|---|
| 1 | 21 | (France) Maxime Berger | Yamaha YZF-R6 | 11 | 20:28.806 | 1 | 25 |
| 2 | 99 | (Netherlands) Roy Ten Napel | Yamaha YZF-R6 | 11 | +9.517 | 4 | 20 |
| 3 | 44 | (United Kingdom) Gino Rea | Suzuki GSX-R600 | 11 | +10.893 | 5 | 16 |
| 4 | 75 | (Germany) Dennis Sigloch | Yamaha YZF-R6 | 11 | +12.592 | 7 | 13 |
| 5 | 89 | (Italy) Domenico Colucci | Ducati 749R | 11 | +12.889 | 2 | 11 |
| 6 | 24 | (Italy) Daniele Beretta | Suzuki GSX-R600 | 11 | +28.944 | 12 | 10 |
| 7 | 119 | (Italy) Michele Magnoni | Yamaha YZF-R6 | 11 | +30.303 | 18 | 9 |
| 8 | 47 | (Italy) Eddi La Marra | Honda CBR600RR | 11 | +31.130 | 6 | 8 |
| 9 | 8 | (Italy) Andrea Antonelli | Honda CBR600RR | 11 | +31.879 | 8 | 7 |
| 10 | 112 | (Spain) Josep Pedró | Yamaha YZF-R6 | 11 | +38.671 | 11 | 6 |
| 11 | 30 | (Switzerland) Michaël Savary | Yamaha YZF-R6 | 11 | +35.870 | 28 | 5 |
| 12 | 57 | (Denmark) Kenny Tirsgaard | Suzuki GSX-R600 | 11 | +52.047 | 17 | 4 |
| 13 | 55 | (Belgium) Vincent Lonbois | Suzuki GSX-R600 | 11 | +52.237 | 26 | 3 |
| 14 | 66 | (Netherlands) Branko Srdanov | Yamaha YZF-R6 | 11 | +52.870 | 15 | 2 |
| 15 | 111 | (Czech Republic) Michal Šembera | Honda CBR600RR | 11 | +53.057 | 13 | 1 |
| 16 | 43 | (Italy) Daniele Rossi | Honda CBR600RR | 11 | +53.803 | 14 | |
| 17 | 48 | (Russia) Vladimir Leonov | Yamaha YZF-R6 | 11 | +57.201 | 19 | |
| 18 | 114 | (Belgium) Nicolas Pirot | Yamaha YZF-R6 | 11 | +1:01.173 | 29 | |
| 19 | 10 | (United Kingdom) Leon Hunt | Honda CBR600RR | 11 | +1:03.101 | 20 | |
| 20 | 4 | (France) Mathieu Gines | Yamaha YZF-R6 | 11 | +1:14.181 | 10 | |
| 21 | 36 | (Spain) Alex Cortes | Yamaha YZF-R6 | 11 | +1:14.235 | 25 | |
| 22 | 31 | (Italy) Giuseppe Barone | Honda CBR600RR | 11 | +1:14.544 | 21 | |
| 23 | 81 | (Czech Republic) Patrik Vostárek | Honda CBR600RR | 11 | +1:16.295 | 27 | |
| 24 | 41 | (Switzerland) Gregory Junod | Kawasaki ZX-6R | 11 | +1:18.208 | 24 | |
| 25 | 28 | (Spain) Yannick Guerra | Yamaha YZF-R6 | 11 | +1:34.364 | 22 | |
| 26 | 22 | (Italy) Gabriele Poma | Yamaha YZF-R6 | 11 | +1:50.641 | 23 | |
| 27 | 35 | (Bulgaria) Radostin Todorov | Yamaha YZF-R6 | 10 | +1 lap | 31 | |
| 28 | 25 | (Australia) Ryan Taylor | Kawasaki ZX-6R | 10 | +1 lap | 32 | |
| Ret | 7 | (Italy) Renato Costantini | Honda CBR600RR | 9 | Retirement | 16 | |
| Ret | 58 | (Spain) Eric Morillas | Yamaha YZF-R6 | 7 | Retirement | 30 | |
| Ret | 199 | (United Kingdom) Gregg Black | Yamaha YZF-R6 | 1 | Retirement | 9 | |
| Ret | 20 | (France) Sylvain Barrier | Yamaha YZF-R6 | 0 | Retirement | 3 | |
| WD | 11 | (Italy) Ashley Carlucci | Kawasaki ZX-6R | | Withdrew | | |
| WD | 18 | (United Kingdom) Daniel Brill | Suzuki GSX-R600 | | Withdrew | | |
