= Arne Tode =

German motorcycle racer

- Nationality: German
- Born: 30 June 1985 (age 41); Bergen auf Rügen, East Germany
- Website: arnetode.com
Motorcycle racing career statistics
Moto2 World Championship
Active years	2010
Manufacturers	Suter
Starts / Wins / Podiums / Poles / F. laps / Points; 10 / 0 / 0 / 0 / 0 / 2
Supersport World Championship
Active years	2004–2005, 2007–2008
Manufacturers	Yamaha, Honda, Triumph
Starts / Wins / Podiums / Poles / F. laps / Points; 8 / 0 / 0 / 0 / 0 / 30

Arne Tode (born 30 June 1985) is a German motorcycle racer who has competed in the Moto2 World Championship, the Supersport World Championship and the FIM Superstock 1000 Cup. He won the IDM Supersport Championship in 2006 and 2008.

== Career statistics ==
- 2006 - 26th, FIM Superstock 1000 Cup, Suzuki
- 2007 - 14th, FIM Superstock 1000 Cup, Honda CBR1000RR

=== Supersport World Championship ===
==== Races by year ====
(key)

Year	Bike	1	2	3	4	5	6	7	8	9	10	11	12	13	Pos.	Pts
2004	Yamaha	SPA; 12	AUS	SMR	ITA	GER; Ret	GBR; Ret	GBR	NED	ITA	FRA				37th	4
2005	Honda	QAT	AUS	SPA	ITA	EUR	SMR	CZE	GBR	NED	GER; 11	ITA	FRA		31st	5
2007	Honda	QAT	AUS	EUR	SPA	NED	ITA	GBR	SMR	CZE	GBR	GER	ITA; 7	FRA; 12	30th	13
2008	Triumph	QAT	AUS	SPA	NED	ITA	GER; 8								30th	8
2008	Honda							SMR; Ret	CZE	GBR	EUR	ITA	FRA	POR	30th	8

=== FIM Superstock 1000 Cup ===
==== Races by year ====
(key) (Races in bold indicate pole position) (Races in italics indicate fastest lap)

Year	Bike	1	2	3	4	5	6	7	8	9	10	11	Pos	Pts
2006	Suzuki	VAL	MNZ	SIL	SMR	BRN	BRA	NED	LAU	IMO; 15	MAG; 6		26th	11
2007	Honda	DON; 8	VAL; 15	NED; Ret	MNZ; 12	SIL; 18	SMR; 11	BRN; Ret	BRA; 10	LAU; 6	ITA	MAG	14th	34

=== Grand Prix motorcycle racing ===
==== By season ====
Season	Class	Motorcycle	Team	Race	Win	Podium	Pole	FLap	Pts	Plcd
2010	Moto2	Suter	Racing Team Germany	10	0	0	0	0	2	38th
Total				**10**	**0**	**0**	**0**	**0**	**2**	

==== Races by year ====
(key)

Year	Class	Bike	1	2	3	4	5	6	7	8	9	10	11	12	13	14	15	16	17	Pos.	Pts
2010	Moto2	Suter	QAT; 21	SPA; 29	FRA; 18	ITA; 24	GBR; 14	NED; Ret	CAT; 17	GER; 27	CZE; Ret	INP; 23	RSM	ARA	JPN	MAL	AUS	POR	VAL	38th	2
