= Alessandro Polita =

Italian motorcycle racer

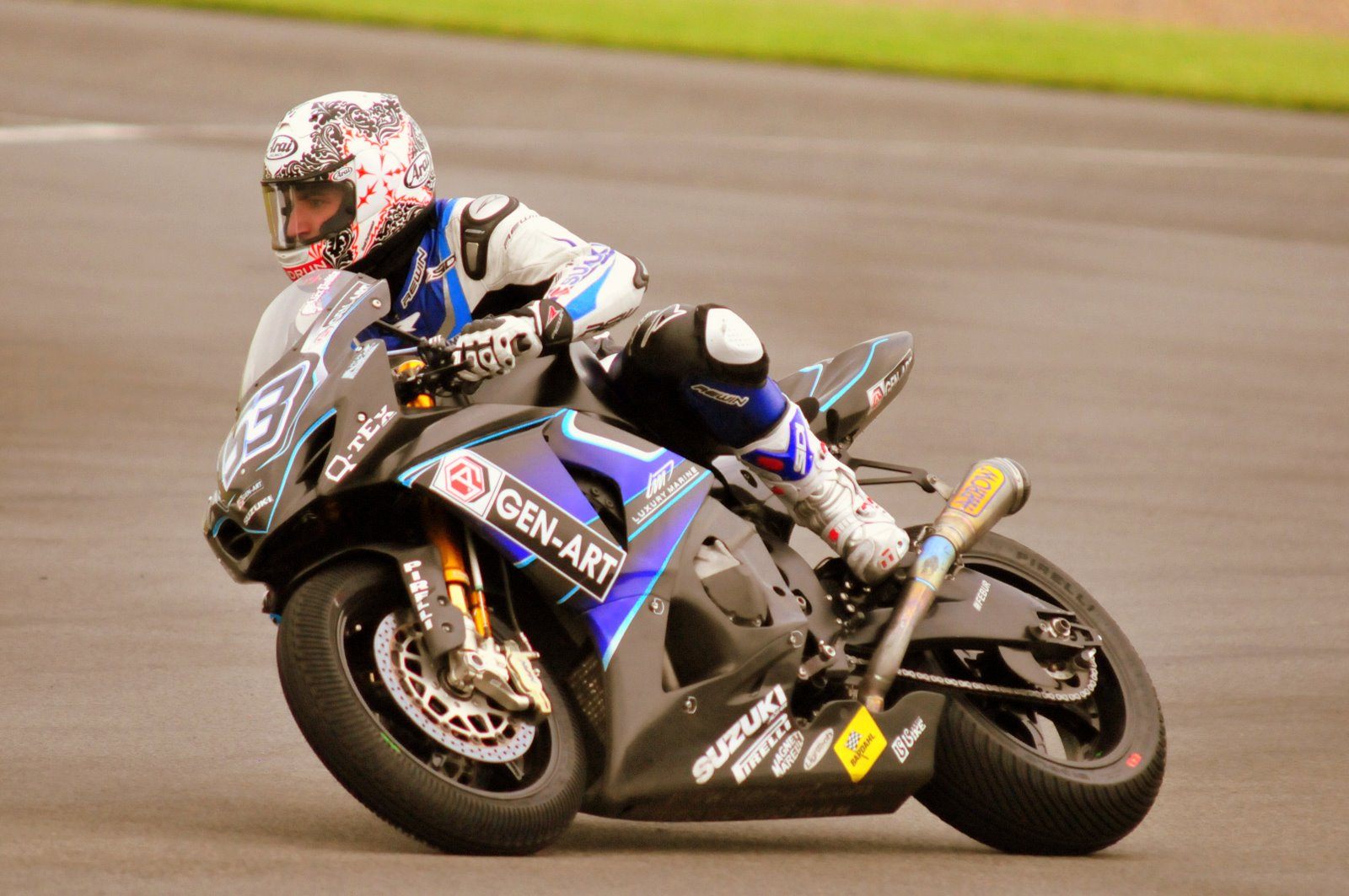
- Nationality: Italian
- Born: 3 June 1984 (age 42); Iesi, Italy
- Website: Official website
Motorcycle racing career statistics
Superbike World Championship
| Active years | 2007, 2009, 2011–2012 |
| Manufacturers | Suzuki, Ducati |
| Championships | 0 |
| 2012 championship position | 32nd (4 pts) |
Starts / Wins / Podiums / Poles / F. laps / Points; 22 / 0 / 0 / 0 / 0 / 18
Supersport World Championship
| Active years | 2001, 2003, 2009 |
| Manufacturers | Yamaha, Suzuki |
| Championships | 0 |
| 2009 championship position | 37th (1 pt) |
Starts / Wins / Podiums / Poles / F. laps / Points; 9 / 0 / 0 / 0 / 0 / 5

Alessandro Polita (born 3 June 1984) is an Italian motorcycle racer, winner of the FIM Superstock 1000 Cup in 2006. His sister, Alessia Polita, also ran as a professional rider, until an accident caused paralysis of the lower limbs.

== Career ==
In 2006, Polita won the FIM Superstock 1000 Cup with a Suzuki GSXR1000 K6 Celani with the Suzuki Italian team. In 2007, he debuted in the World Superbike championship with the same team. That season, where Polita reported some injuries, he rode his Suzuki GSX-R1000 K6 to eight World Championship points, earned him 24th place overall.

In 2008, Polita joined team Sterilgarda Team Go Eleven for racing with a Ducati 1098 in the FIM Superstock 1000 Cup. He ended the season in third place. He won the Grand Prix of San Marino at Misano Adriatico.

In 2009, Polita returned to World Superbike with the Sterilgarda team, but the economic crisis some sponsors to withdraw, forcing the team from Brescia to participate in the season with only Shane Byrne.

After a few weeks, however Polita moved over to the World Supersport Championship riding the Suzuki GSX-R600 for the Hoegee Suzuki team. On 13 June 2009, following the withdrawal by team Hoegee due to economic problems he was again left without a ride.

On July 4, 2009, Polita inked an agreement with the Celani Race team to participate in the World Superbike, replacing Karl Muggeridge from the San Marino Grand Prix.

In 2010, Polita participated in the Italian Superbike Championship with a Ducati 1098 Team, Barni Racing . He won the title with a race before the end of the season, winning two races and standing on the podium in all the races on the calendar, surpassing the 41 points of his teammate Stefano Cruciani.

In 2011, Polita repeated his participation in the Italian Superbike Championship with Team Barni Ducati and in some of the World Superbike races as a wild card .

Polita debuted at the 2016 Isle of Man TT, reaching 47th in the Superbike category and 40th in the Superstock race.

Since the end of 2018, Polita started racing in the IDM Superbike 1000 in a Honda CBR 1000 RR for the team Holzhauer Racing Promotion. He managed only one third place, in the Most race 1. He managed to score 152 points at the end of that season. He was scheduled to race for the team at the 2020 season.

== Career statistics ==
2004 - 9th, Superstock European Championship, Ducati 999
2005 - 4th, FIM Superstock 1000 Cup, Suzuki
2006 - 1st, FIM Superstock 1000 Cup, Suzuki
2008 - 3rd, FIM Superstock 1000 Cup, Ducati

=== CIV Championship (Campionato Italiano Velocita) ===
==== Races by year ====
(key) (Races in bold indicate pole position; races in italics indicate fastest lap)

| Year | Class | Bike | 1 | 2 | 3 | 4 | 5 | 6 | Pos | Pts |
|---|---|---|---|---|---|---|---|---|---|---|
| 2002 | Supersport | Yamaha | IMO | VAL | MUG; 14 | MIS1 | MIS2; 8 | | 19th | 10 |
| 2003 | Supersport | Yamaha | MIS1; 4 | MUG1; 7 | MIS1; 6 | MUG2; 4 | VAL; 10 | | 7th | 51 |
| 2004 | Stock 1000 | Ducati | MUG; 6 | IMO; 1 | VAL1 | MIS; 4 | VAL2; 6 | | 5th | 58 |
| 2005 | Stock 1000 | Suzuki | VAL; 2 | MON; 1 | IMO; 2 | MIS1; 4 | MUG; 2 | MIS2; 1 | 1st | 123 |

=== Superstock European Championship ===
==== Races by year ====
(key) (Races in bold indicate pole position) (Races in italics indicate fastest lap)

| Year | Bike | 1 | 2 | 3 | 4 | 5 | 6 | 7 | 8 | 9 | Pos | Pts |
|---|---|---|---|---|---|---|---|---|---|---|---|---|
| 2004 | Ducati | VAL; DNS | SMR; 3 | MNZ; Ret | OSC; 9 | SIL; Ret | BRA; 10 | NED; 7 | IMO; 8 | MAG; 12 | 9th | 50 |

=== FIM Superstock 1000 Cup ===
==== Races by year ====
(key) (Races in bold indicate pole position) (Races in italics indicate fastest lap)

| Year | Bike | 1 | 2 | 3 | 4 | 5 | 6 | 7 | 8 | 9 | 10 | Pos | Pts |
|---|---|---|---|---|---|---|---|---|---|---|---|---|---|
| 2005 | Suzuki | VAL; Ret | MNZ; 7 | SIL; 10 | SMR; 5 | BRN; 6 | BRA; 3 | NED; 1 | LAU; 4 | IMO; 2 | MAG; 5 | 4th | 121 |
| 2006 | Suzuki | VAL; 1 | MNZ; 1 | SIL; 2 | SMR; 1 | BRN; Ret | BRA; 2 | NED; 3 | LAU; 10 | IMO; 3 | MAG; 2 | 1st | 173 |
| 2008 | Ducati | VAL; 4 | NED; 4 | MNZ; 3 | NŰR; 16 | SMR; 1 | BRN; 3 | BRA; 5 | DON; 2 | MAG; 4 | ALG; 6 | 3rd | 137 |

=== British Superbike Championship ===
==== By year ====
(key) (Races in bold indicate pole position; races in italics indicate fastest lap)

| Year | Make | 1 | | 2 | | 3 | | | 4 | | 5 | | 6 | | | 7 | | | 8 | | | 9 | | | 10 | | 11 | | 12 | | | Pos | Pts |
| Year | Make | R1 | R2 | R1 | R2 | R1 | R2 | R3 | R1 | R2 | R1 | R2 | R1 | R2 | R3 | R1 | R2 | R3 | R1 | R2 | R3 | R1 | R2 | R3 | R1 | R2 | R1 | R2 | R1 | R2 | R3 | Pos | Pts |
|---|---|---|---|---|---|---|---|---|---|---|---|---|---|---|---|---|---|---|---|---|---|---|---|---|---|---|---|---|---|---|---|---|---|
| 2012 | Ducati | BHI; 11 | BHI; C | THR; 19 | THR; Ret | OUL; Ret | OUL; 17 | OUL; Ret | SNE; Ret | SNE; DNS | KNO | KNO | OUL | OUL | OUL | BHGP | BHGP | | CAD | CAD | | DON; 19 | DON; Ret | | ASS | ASS | SIL | SIL | BHGP; 20 | BHGP; 17 | BHGP; Ret | 31st | 5 |

| Year | Make | 1 | | 2 | | 3 | | | 4 | | 5 | | 6 | | | 7 | | 8 | | | 9 | | | 10 | | 11 | | 12 | | | Pos | Pts |
| Year | Make | R1 | R2 | R1 | R2 | R1 | R2 | R3 | R1 | R2 | R1 | R2 | R1 | R2 | R3 | R1 | R2 | R1 | R2 | R3 | R1 | R2 | R3 | R1 | R2 | R1 | R2 | R1 | R2 | R3 | Pos | Pts |
|---|---|---|---|---|---|---|---|---|---|---|---|---|---|---|---|---|---|---|---|---|---|---|---|---|---|---|---|---|---|---|---|---|
| 2016 | Ducati | SIL | SIL | OUL | OUL | BHI | BHI | | KNO | KNO | SNE | SNE | THR | THR | | BHGP | BHGP | CAD | CAD | | OUL | OUL | OUL | DON | DON | ASS; 22 | ASS; 19 | BHGP; Ret | BHGP; 18 | BHGP; Ret | NC | 0 |
