= 2004 Superbike World Championship =

2004 Superbike World Championship
Previous:	2003	Next:	2005
Support series: Supersport World Championship; Superstock European Championship

The 2004 Superbike World Championship was the seventeenth FIM Superbike World Championship season. The season started on 29 February at Valencia and finished on 3 October at Magny-Cours after 11 rounds. The traditional Japanese round at Sugo was replaced with a new Canadian round which was scheduled for 4 July at the Mont-Tremblant, near Quebec. Though no explanation was given for the change, it was seen as some form of revenge after the refusal of the Japanese manufacturers to back the 2004 rules. The Canadian round was eventually canceled after a circuit inspection determined that the amount of work necessary to bring the venue up to WSBK standard could not be carried out in time for the proposed date.

2004 was the first season all bikes had to use control tyres, provided by Pirelli. Partly because of the control tyre rule, no factory bikes were entered by Japanese manufacturers.

James Toseland won the riders' championship and Ducati won the manufacturers' championship.

== Race calendar and results ==
2004 Superbike World Championship Calendar
Round		Circuit	Date	Superpole	Fastest lap	Winning rider	Winning team	Report
1	R1	(Spain) Valencia	29 February	(France) Régis Laconi	(Australia) Garry McCoy	(United Kingdom) James Toseland	Ducati Fila	Report
1	R2	(Spain) Valencia	29 February	(France) Régis Laconi	(Japan) Noriyuki Haga	(Japan) Noriyuki Haga	Renegade Ducati	Report
2	R1	(Australia) Phillip Island	28 March	(France) Régis Laconi	(France) Régis Laconi	(France) Régis Laconi	Ducati Fila	Report
2	R2	(Australia) Phillip Island	28 March	(France) Régis Laconi	(Australia) Garry McCoy	(Australia) Garry McCoy	XEROX - Ducati Nortel Net.	Report
3	R1	(San Marino) Misano	18 April	(Australia) Steve Martin	(France) Régis Laconi	(France) Régis Laconi	Ducati Fila	Report
3	R2	(San Marino) Misano	18 April	(Australia) Steve Martin	(Italy) Pierfrancesco Chili	(Italy) Pierfrancesco Chili	PSG - 1 Corse	Report
4	R1	(Italy) Monza	16 May	(France) Régis Laconi	(France) Régis Laconi	(France) Régis Laconi	Ducati Fila	Report
4	R2	(Italy) Monza	16 May	(France) Régis Laconi	(France) Régis Laconi	(France) Régis Laconi	Ducati Fila	Report
5	R1	(Germany) Oschersleben	30 May	(Australia) Troy Corser	(Japan) Noriyuki Haga	(Japan) Noriyuki Haga	Renegade Ducati	Report
5	R2	(Germany) Oschersleben	30 May	(Australia) Troy Corser	(Japan) Noriyuki Haga	(France) Régis Laconi	Ducati Fila	Report
6	R1	(United Kingdom) Silverstone	13 June	(France) Régis Laconi	(France) Régis Laconi	(Japan) Noriyuki Haga	Renegade Ducati	Report
6	R2	(United Kingdom) Silverstone	13 June	(France) Régis Laconi	(Australia) Chris Vermeulen	(Australia) Chris Vermeulen	Ten Kate Honda	Report
7	R1	(United States) Laguna Seca	11 July	(Australia) Steve Martin	(Australia) Chris Vermeulen	(Australia) Chris Vermeulen	Ten Kate Honda	Report
7	R2	(United States) Laguna Seca	11 July	(Australia) Steve Martin	(Australia) Chris Vermeulen	(Australia) Chris Vermeulen	Ten Kate Honda	Report
8	R1	(European Union) Brands Hatch	1 August	(Australia) Steve Martin	(Italy) Pierfrancesco Chili	(Japan) Noriyuki Haga	Renegade Ducati Koji	Report
8	R2	(European Union) Brands Hatch	1 August	(Australia) Steve Martin	(Italy) Pierfrancesco Chili	(Japan) Noriyuki Haga	Renegade Ducati Koji	Report
9	R1	(Netherlands) Assen	5 September	(Italy) Pierfrancesco Chili	(Japan) Noriyuki Haga	(United Kingdom) James Toseland	Ducati Fila	Report
9	R2	(Netherlands) Assen	5 September	(Italy) Pierfrancesco Chili	(Japan) Noriyuki Haga	(Australia) Chris Vermeulen	Ten Kate Honda	Report
10	R1	(Italy) Imola	26 September	(France) Régis Laconi	(France) Régis Laconi	(France) Régis Laconi	Ducati Fila	Report
10	R2	(Italy) Imola	26 September	(France) Régis Laconi	(Japan) Noriyuki Haga	(France) Régis Laconi	Ducati Fila	Report
11	R1	(France) Magny-Cours	3 October	(Australia) Troy Corser	(Australia) Steve Martin	(United Kingdom) James Toseland	Ducati Fila	Report
11	R2	(France) Magny-Cours	3 October	(Australia) Troy Corser	(Japan) Noriyuki Haga	(Japan) Noriyuki Haga	Renegade Ducati Koji	Report

== Championship standings ==
=== Riders' standings ===
2004 final riders' standings
Pos.	Rider	Bike	ESP (Spain)		AUS (Australia)		SMR (San Marino)		ITA (Italy)		GER (Germany)		GBR (United Kingdom)		USA (United States)		GBR (United Kingdom)		NED (Netherlands)		ITA (Italy)		FRA (France)		Pts
Pos.	Rider	Bike	R1	R2	R1	R2	R1	R2	R1	R2	R1	R2	R1	R2	R1	R2	R1	R2	R1	R2	R1	R2	R1	R2	Pts
1	(United Kingdom) James Toseland	Ducati	1	2	3	Ret	10	6	2	2	2	2	Ret	5	4	2	7	Ret	1	2	3	2	1	2	336
2	(France) Régis Laconi	Ducati	**Ret**	**Ret**	**1**	**Ret**	1	2	**1**	**1**	6	1	**Ret**	**3**	5	3	2	Ret	3	5	**1**	**1**	3	3	327
3	(Japan) Noriyuki Haga	Ducati	Ret	1	8	6	4	4	Ret	Ret	1	Ret	1	2	6	4	1	1	4	3	4	Ret	2	1	299
4	(Australia) Chris Vermeulen	Honda	12	5	2	2	5	12	4	DSQ	15	8	2	1	1	1	4	3	5	1	2	6	Ret	Ret	282
5	(Italy) Pierfrancesco Chili	Ducati	2	4	9	3	3	1	Ret	Ret	3	Ret	3	Ret	2	5	Ret	2	**2**	**4**	7	Ret	6	5	243
6	(Australia) Garry McCoy	Ducati	7	6	5	1	Ret	17	3	3	9	4	4	8	7	7	Ret	7	8	Ret	5	5	9	9	199
7	(Australia) Steve Martin	Ducati	Ret	3	4	Ret	**7**	**3**	Ret	8	5	Ret	6	6	**3**	**6**	**3**	**Ret**	7	Ret	6	3	5	Ret	181
8	(United Kingdom) Leon Haslam	Ducati	5	9	Ret	10	11	5	5	4	7	3	5	4	9	Ret	Ret	Ret	6	6	10	12	7	6	169
9	(Australia) Troy Corser	Petronas	Ret	11	13	5	2	7	9	5	**4**	**Ret**	7	9	10	Ret	5	Ret	10	7	12	10	**Ret**	**7**	146
10	(Italy) Marco Borciani	Ducati	4	8	7	4	21	10	7	6	Ret	Ret	8	11	11	8	11	Ret	9	8	8	8	Ret	Ret	130
11	(United Kingdom) Chris Walker	Petronas	3	7	10	8	6	13	8	7	Ret	7	Ret	12	Ret	Ret	9	4	12	10	Ret	16	8	8	128
12	(Italy) Ivan Clementi	Kawasaki	Ret	14	11	9	12	Ret	11	10	11	9	10	10	Ret	10	14	11	Ret	9	11	9	Ret	Ret	85
13	(Italy) Mauro Sanchini	Kawasaki	14	10	6	7	Ret	11	Ret	9	10	6	Ret	13	8	9	Ret	10	Ret	DNS	WD	WD			79
14	(Italy) Gianluca Nannelli	Ducati	6	Ret	12	12	8	Ret	Ret	Ret	12	5	Ret	Ret	Ret	Ret	10	Ret	11	Ret	9	4	Ret	Ret	72
15	(Italy) Piergiorgio Bontempi	Suzuki	15	16	NC	11	9	15	10	11	14	11	9	14	13	12	15	12	13	12	13	Ret	11	Ret	68
16	(Italy) Lucio Pedercini	Ducati	Ret	13	Ret	Ret	Ret	8	Ret	12	Ret	Ret	Ret	15	12	11	13	Ret	Ret	DNS	Ret	7	12	DNS	41
17	(Spain) Sergio Fuertes	Suzuki	8	12	Ret	Ret	Ret	18	6	Ret	DNS	DNS	13	Ret			Ret	13	15	14	Ret	Ret	Ret	12	35
18	(France) Sébastien Gimbert	Yamaha															Ret	9					4	4	33
19	(United Kingdom) James Ellison	Yamaha											Ret	7			6	5							30
20	(Australia) Warwick Nowland	Suzuki	11	17	15	14	18	Ret	DNS	DNS	DNS	DNS	11	Ret	Ret	13	16	Ret	14	13	17	18	16	10	27
21	(Italy) Giovanni Bussei	Ducati															12	6	Ret	11	Ret	11	Ret	DNS	24
22	(Italy) Alessio Velini	Yamaha	Ret	18	14	13	13	Ret	Ret	13	16	12	Ret	Ret	Ret	Ret	17	14	Ret	Ret					20
22	(Italy) Alessio Velini	Ducati																			Ret	15	14	Ret	20
23	(Austria) Horst Saiger	Yamaha	9	15					13	14					14	14									17
24	(Australia) Craig Coxhell	Honda															8	8							16
25	(Czech Republic) Jiří Mrkývka	Ducati	10	Ret	DNS	DNS	19	16	Ret	Ret	Ret	13	12	16	Ret	Ret	Ret	DNS	Ret	Ret	19	19	Ret	Ret	13
26	(Italy) Luca Pini	Suzuki					Ret	9													14	13			12
27	(France) Stéphane Duterne	Kawasaki																			Ret	24	10	11	11
28	(Austria) Andreas Meklau	Suzuki									13	10													9
29	(Germany) Jürgen Oelschläger	Honda									8	Ret													8
30	(Portugal) Miguel Praia	Ducati	13	19	16	Ret	DNQ	DNQ	Ret	Ret	17	Ret	14	Ret	DNS	Ret	Ret	15	Ret	16	Ret	21	18	14	8
31	(Italy) Giancarlo De Matteis	Ducati					16	Ret	12	Ret							Ret	Ret			21	DNS			4
32	(Poland) Paweł Szkopek	Suzuki																			Ret	23	15	13	4
33	(Italy) Ivan Sala	Suzuki					14	20	14	Ret															4
34	(Italy) Stefano Cruciani	Kawasaki																					13	Ret	3
35	(Italy) Doriano Romboni	Yamaha					DNS	DNS													15	14			3
36	(Italy) Gianmaria Liverani	Ducati					15	14																	3
37	(Norway) Carl Berthelsen	Suzuki									18	14											19	Ret	2
38	(Slovenia) Berto Camlek	Yamaha					20	Ret															17	15	1
39	(Netherlands) Robert Menzen	Suzuki																	16	15					1
Pos.	Rider	Bike	ESP (Spain)		AUS (Australia)		SMR (San Marino)		ITA (Italy)		GER (Germany)		GBR (United Kingdom)		USA (United States)		GBR (United Kingdom)		NED (Netherlands)		ITA (Italy)		FRA (France)		Pts

Colour	Result
Gold	Winner
Silver	Second place
Bronze	Third place
Green	Points classification
Blue	Non-points classification
Blue	Non-classified finish (NC)
Purple	Retired, not classified (Ret)
Red	Did not qualify (DNQ)
Red	Did not pre-qualify (DNPQ)
Black	Disqualified (DSQ)
White	Did not start (DNS)
White	Withdrew (WD)
White	Race cancelled (C)
Blank	Did not practice (DNP)
Blank	Did not arrive (DNA)
Blank	Excluded (EX)

**Bold** – Pole position
Italics – Fastest lap

=== Manufacturers' standings ===
Pos.	Manufacturer	ESP (Spain)		AUS (Australia)		SMR (San Marino)		ITA (Italy)		GER (Germany)		GBR (United Kingdom)		USA (United States)		GBR (United Kingdom)		NED (Netherlands)		ITA (Italy)		FRA (France)		Pts
Pos.	Manufacturer	R1	R2	R1	R2	R1	R2	R1	R2	R1	R2	R1	R2	R1	R2	R1	R2	R1	R2	R1	R2	R1	R2	Pts
1	(Italy) Ducati	1	1	1	1	1	1	1	1	1	1	1	2	2	2	1	1	1	2	1	1	1	1	530
2	(Japan) Honda	12	5	2	2	5	12	4	Ret	8	8	2	1	1	1	4	3	5	1	2	6	Ret	Ret	289
3	(Malaysia) Petronas	3	7	10	5	2	7	8	5	4	7	7	9	10	Ret	5	4	10	7	12	10	8	7	200
4	(Japan) Kawasaki	14	10	6	7	12	11	11	9	10	6	10	10	8	9	14	10	Ret	9	11	9	10	11	129
5	(Japan) Suzuki	8	12	15	11	9	9	6	11	13	10	9	14	13	12	15	12	13	12	13	13	11	10	101
6	(Japan) Yamaha	9	15	14	13	13	Ret	13	13	16	12	Ret	7	14	14	6	5	Ret	Ret	15	14	4	4	89
NC	(Italy) MV Agusta																			16	17			0
Pos.	Manufacturer	ESP (Spain)		AUS (Australia)		SMR (San Marino)		ITA (Italy)		GER (Germany)		GBR (United Kingdom)		USA (United States)		GBR (United Kingdom)		NED (Netherlands)		ITA (Italy)		FRA (France)		Pts

== Entry list ==
2004 entry list
Team	Constructor	Motorcycle	No.	Rider	Rounds
(Malaysia) Foggy Petronas Racing	Petronas	Petronas FP1	4	(Australia) Troy Corser	All
(Malaysia) Foggy Petronas Racing	Petronas	Petronas FP1	9	(United Kingdom) Chris Walker	All
(China) Zongshen	Suzuki	Suzuki GSX-R1000	5	(Italy) Piergiorgio Bontempi	All
(China) Zongshen	Suzuki	Suzuki GSX-R1000	12	(Australia) Warwick Nowland	All
(China) Zongshen	Kawasaki	Kawasaki ZX 10	39	(France) Stéphane Duterne	10–11
(Italy) Kawasaki Bertocchi	Kawasaki	Kawasaki ZX 10	6	(Italy) Mauro Sanchini	1–10
(Italy) Kawasaki Bertocchi	Kawasaki	Kawasaki ZX 10	8	(Italy) Ivan Clementi	All
(Italy) Kawasaki Bertocchi	Kawasaki	Kawasaki ZX 10	15	(Italy) Stefano Cruciani	11
(San Marino) PSG - 1 Corse	Ducati	Ducati 998 RS; Ducati 999 RS	7	(Italy) Pierfrancesco Chili	All
(San Marino) PSG - 1 Corse	Ducati	Ducati 998 RS; Ducati 999 RS	27	(Italy) Giancarlo De Matteis	8, 10
(Italy) Carbon Dream	Ducati	Ducati 998 RS	11	(Italy) Gianmaria Liverani	3
MIR Racing	Suzuki	Suzuki GSX-R1000	16	(Spain) Sergio Fuertes	1–6, 8–11
(Netherlands) Ten Kate Honda	Honda	Honda CBR1000RR	17	(Australia) Chris Vermeulen	All
(Italy) Pedercini	Ducati	Ducati 998 RS	19	(Italy) Lucio Pedercini	All
(Italy) Pedercini	Ducati	Ducati 998 RS	25	(Italy) Alessio Velini	10–11
(Italy) Pedercini	Ducati	Ducati 998 RS	69	(Italy) Gianluca Nannelli	1–9
(Italy) D.F.Xtreme Sterilgarda	Ducati	Ducati 999 RS	20	(Italy) Marco Borciani	All
(Italy) D.F.Xtreme Sterilgarda	Ducati	Ducati 999 RS	99	(Australia) Steve Martin	All
(Austria) Life Haus RT	Yamaha	Yamaha YZF-R1	22	(Austria) Horst Saiger	1, 4, 7
(Czech Republic) JM SBK	Ducati	Ducati 998 RS	23	(Czech Republic) Jiří Mrkývka	All
(Italy) XEROX – Ducati Nortel Net.	Ducati	Ducati 999 RS	24	(Australia) Garry McCoy	All
(Italy) XEROX – Ducati Nortel Net.	Ducati	Ducati 999 RS	27	(Italy) Giancarlo De Matteis	3–4
(Italy) XEROX – Ducati Nortel Net.	Ducati	Ducati 999 RS	48	(Spain) David García	5–6
(Italy) XEROX – Ducati Nortel Net.	Ducati	Ducati 999 RS	50	(Portugal) Miguel Praia	All
(Italy) XEROX – Ducati Nortel Net.	Ducati	Ducati 999 RS	69	(Italy) Gianluca Nannelli	10–11
(Italy) UnionBike GiMotorsport	Yamaha	Yamaha YZF-R1	25	(Italy) Alessio Velini	1–9
(Italy) UnionBike GiMotorsport	Yamaha	Yamaha YZF-R1	78	(Poland) Teodor Myszkowski	11
(Italy) UnionBike GiMotorsport	Yamaha	Yamaha YZF-R1	113	(Italy) Paolo Blora	10
(Italy) Giesse Racing Team	Yamaha	Yamaha YZF-R1	28	(Italy) Doriano Romboni	3, 10
(Italy) Boselli Racing	Suzuki	Suzuki GSX-R1000	29	(Italy) Luca Pini	3, 10
(Italy) Penta Race	Ducati	Ducati 998 RS	31	(Italy) Giuseppe Zannini	3, 10
Yamaha France	Yamaha	Yamaha YZF-R1	32	(France) Sébastien Gimbert	8, 11
(Netherlands) Suzuki Netthandelen (Netherlands) Suzuki Nederland	Suzuki	Suzuki GSX-R1000	33	(Norway) Carl Berthelsen	5, 11
Yoshimura Schäfer Motorsport	Suzuki	Suzuki GSX-R1000	34	(Austria) Andreas Meklau	5
(United Kingdom) Vitrans Honda	Honda	Honda	35	(Australia) Craig Coxhell	8
(Netherlands) Robert Menzen Racing	Suzuki	Suzuki GSX-R1000	36	(Netherlands) Robert Menzen	9
(Croatia) Pajic-Kawasaki	Kawasaki	Kawasaki ZX 10	38	(Netherlands) Arno Visscher	9
Renegade Ducati; Renegade Ducati Koji	Ducati	Ducati 999 RS	41	(Japan) Noriyuki Haga	All
Renegade Ducati; Renegade Ducati Koji	Ducati	Ducati 999 RS	91	(United Kingdom) Leon Haslam	All
Team Anyway Fidoweb	Suzuki	Suzuki GSX-R1000	45	(Italy) Ivan Sala	3–4
(Italy) Ducati Fila	Ducati	Ducati 999 F04	52	(United Kingdom) James Toseland	All
(Italy) Ducati Fila	Ducati	Ducati 999 F04	55	(France) Régis Laconi	All
(Germany) Alpha Technik	Honda	Honda CBR1000RR	71	(Germany) Michael Schulten	5
(Germany) Alpha Technik	Honda	Honda CBR1000RR	72	(Germany) Jürgen Oelschläger	5
(Italy) Mazzali Racing Team	MV Agusta	MV Agusta	74	(Italy) Andrea Mazzali	10
Inoterm Racing Team	Yamaha	Yamaha YZF-R1	77	(Slovenia) Berto Camlek	3, 11
(Poland) Szkopek Agip RT	Suzuki	Suzuki GSX-R1000	94	(Poland) Paweł Szkopek	10–11
Yamaha Castrol Poland	Yamaha	Yamaha YZF-R1	95	(Poland) Andrzej Pawelec	11
(United Kingdom) Jentin Racing	Yamaha	Yamaha YZF-R1	100	(United Kingdom) James Ellison	6, 8
(Italy) Guandalini	Ducati	Ducati 999 RS	113	(Italy) Paolo Blora	4
(Italy) DeCecco Racing	Ducati	Ducati 998 RS	200	(Italy) Giovanni Bussei	8–11

Key
Regular rider
Wildcard rider
Replacement rider

- All entries used Pirelli tyres.
