= Martin Glossop =

British motorcycle racer

- Nationality: Great Britain
- Born: 18 July 1989 (age 37); Bristol, United Kingdom
Motorcycle racing career statistics
125cc World Championship
| Active years | 2009 |
| Manufacturers | Honda |
Starts / Wins / Podiums / Poles / F. laps / Points; 1 / 0 / 0 / 0 / 0 / 2

Martin Glossop (born 18 July 1989 in Bristol) is a Grand Prix motorcycle racer from the United Kingdom.

== Career statistics ==
=== By season ===
| Season | Class | Motorcycle | Team | Number | Race | Win | Podium | Pole | FLap | Pts | Plcd |
|---|---|---|---|---|---|---|---|---|---|---|---|
| 2009 | 125cc | Honda | KRP Bradley Smith Racing | 91 | 1 | 0 | 0 | 0 | 0 | 2 | 30th |
| Total | | | | | **1** | **0** | **0** | **0** | **0** | **2** | |

=== Races by year ===
(key) (Races in bold indicate pole position)

| Yr | Class | Bike | 1 | 2 | 3 | 4 | 5 | 6 | 7 | 8 | 9 | 10 | 11 | 12 | 13 | 14 | 15 | 16 | Final Pos | Pts |
|---|---|---|---|---|---|---|---|---|---|---|---|---|---|---|---|---|---|---|---|---|
| 2009 | 125 cc | Honda | QAT | JPN | SPA | FRA | ITA | CAT | NED | GER | GBR; 14 | CZE | INP | RSM | POR | AUS | MAL | VAL | 30th | 2 |

=== British 125cc Championship ===
(key) (Races in bold indicate pole position, races in italics indicate fastest lap)

| Year | Bike | 1 | 2 | 3 | 4 | 5 | 6 | 7 | 8 | 9 | 10 | 11 | 12 | Pos | Pts |
|---|---|---|---|---|---|---|---|---|---|---|---|---|---|---|---|
| 2009 | Seel | BHI; 1 | OUL; 1 | DON; 1 | THR; Ret | SNE; 5 | KNO; 5 | MAL; Ret | BHGP; 4 | CAD; 1 | CRO; Ret | SIL; 2 | OUL; Ret | **3rd** | **155** |
