= James Toseland =

British former motorcycle racer

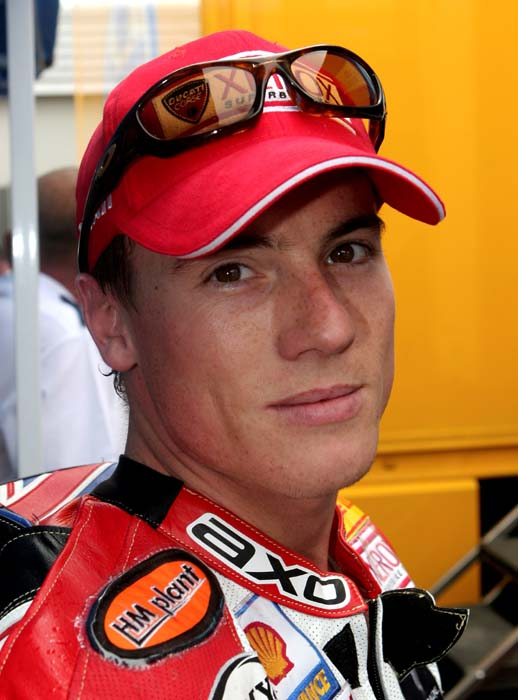
- Toseland in 2005
- Nationality: English
- Born: 5 October 1980 (age 46); Doncaster, South Yorkshire
Motorcycle racing career statistics
MotoGP World Championship
| Active years | 2008–2009 |
| Manufacturers | Yamaha |
| Championships | 0 |
| 2009 championship position | 13th (78 pts) |
Starts / Wins / Podiums / Poles / F. laps / Points; 35 / 0 / 0 / 0 / 0 / 197
Superbike World Championship
| Active years | 2001–2007, 2010-2011 |
| Manufacturers | Ducati, Honda, Yamaha, BMW Motorrad |
| Championships | 2 (2004, 2007) |
Starts / Wins / Podiums / Poles / F. laps / Points; 201 / 16 / 61 / 4 / 2 / 2.098
Supersport World Championship
| Active years | 1999 |
| Manufacturers | Honda |
| Championships | 0 |
Starts / Wins / Podiums / Poles / F. laps / Points; 11 / 0 / 0 / 0 / 0 / 59

James Michael Toseland (born 5 October 1980) is an English former motorcycle racer, commentator and vocalist of his own rock band named Toseland. For 2020, he was team-manager of Wepol Racing with riders in World Supersport and Supersport 300, and is a television motorcycle racing commentator.

Toseland was the World Superbike Champion for 2007 on a Honda Fireblade prepared by Ten Kate, and also won the Superbike World Championship for 2004 on a Ducati. He is one of only three people, the others being Troy Corser and Toprak Razgatlıoğlu, to have won the World Superbike Championship for two different manufacturers. On 9 September 2011, he officially retired from professional motorsport due to a wrist injury sustained in March 2011 at an official World Superbike Championship testing session at Motorland Aragon, Spain. He underwent nine surgeries and his recent surgery in the US during 2023 to restore some movement and reduce pain.

Aside from racing, Toseland is a pianist (reaching Grade 6) and singer-songwriter who performs with his Toseland band around the world. He has also performed alongside Ray Stubbs for the BBC's Sport Relief and played a piano set at the BBC Sports Personality of the Year awards in 2007.

== Early life and education ==
Toseland was born in Doncaster, South Yorkshire. His parents separated when he was young and he was subsequently raised by his mother in Kiveton Park in the Borough of Rotherham. After his mother started a relationship with Ken Wright, Toseland accepted him as his default father figure, and began taking interest in Wright's hobbies. Toseland began taking piano lessons aged eight, taught by a professional pianist; and he also started riding motocross bikes on the coal slag heaps close to his home. He was taught from Year 7 to Year 11 at Wales High School, located in Kiveton Park.

Although the family struggled with income, Toseland attended junior trials and motocross events across the UK. However, Wright and Toseland's mother separated when Toseland was in his early teens and Wright later died by suicide. Toseland kept up his piano lessons, achieving Grade 6 but not quite enough for him to gain a place at the London College of Music.

== Motorcycle racing career (1995–2000) ==
Transferring his motorcycle career from off-road to road racing after Wright's death, Toseland quickly worked his way up through the ranks becoming 1995 Junior Road Race Champion before moving on to 125cc racing in the UK Superteen series, and then sprang to prominence in the late nineties when he dominated the Honda CB500 Cup series at the age of 17. He was then picked up to ride a Supersport Honda and won races at national level.

As a result of his early racing success, Toseland was signed to the factory Castrol Honda World Supersport squad, where he rode for two years finishing 18th and 11th in the championship with best results of eighth in his first year and sixth in the first round of the second year.

Toseland joined the British Superbike Championship series in 2000, riding for Paul Bird's Vimto-sponsored team on a Honda VTR He contested the first seven rounds, missing four more through injury, and over the course of these picked up 101 points. Altogether, this placed him 12th in the championship and his results included seven finishes in the top-eight riders, including two sixth places at Oulton Park.

== Superbike World Championship (2001–2007) ==
As a result of his early racing success, Toseland was signed to the factory Castrol Honda World Supersport squad where he rode for two years finishing 18th and 11th in the championship with best results of 8th in his first year and sixth in the first round of the second year. In 2001, at the age of 20, Toseland joined the GSE team to partner Neil Hodgson in the Superbikes World Championship. Having never taken a top-five finish in either the British Superbike Championship or the Supersport World Championship, he was not initially as competitive as Hodgson. However, by late 2002 he was challenging for top-five results and took seventh place overall that year. In 2003, the team was more competitive than ever, allowing Toseland to take his first win at Oschersleben and third in the championship overall.

In 2004 after both Neil Hodgson and Ruben Xaus left the Superbike World Championship to race in MotoGP, Toseland joined the factory Fila Ducati team as second rider to the experienced Regis Laconi, aboard the dominant 999 F04 motorcycle. Toseland put together a consistent series to stay with Regis Laconi all the way, and even ahead at several meetings. The final races at Magny-Cours saw youngster Toseland out-ride his experienced teammate, giving him the title by a nine-point margin. A final tally of 336 included three wins and 11 other podium finishes. At the age of 23 years and 364 days, he is the youngest Superbike World Champion until this day.

2005 proved to be more of a struggle for Toseland, with a lack of team support as well as the returning Suzuki and Yamaha teams and the improving Honda camp of five riders including Chris Vermeulen and Pierfrancesco Chili. This combination of factors ended the domination of Ducati, and Troy Corser took the championship on a Suzuki, with Toseland finishing fourth overall.

For 2006, Toseland switched to the Winston Ten Kate Racing Honda racing team, replacing the MotoGP-bound Chris Vermeulen, where he rode alongside Australian Karl Muggeridge. Toseland won the season-opener in Qatar, and finished second in the championship behind Troy Bayliss. He was contacted to replace injured Toni Elías for the Fortuna Honda team for a one-off appearance in MotoGP, but this did not happen for sponsor-related reasons.

Toseland was linked to the d'antin Ducati satellite team in MotoGP in 2006, and received an offer to ride for them in 2007. However, d'antin had not performed well over recent years, and Toseland turned the offer down, not willing to make up the grid on a bike that wasn't competitive.

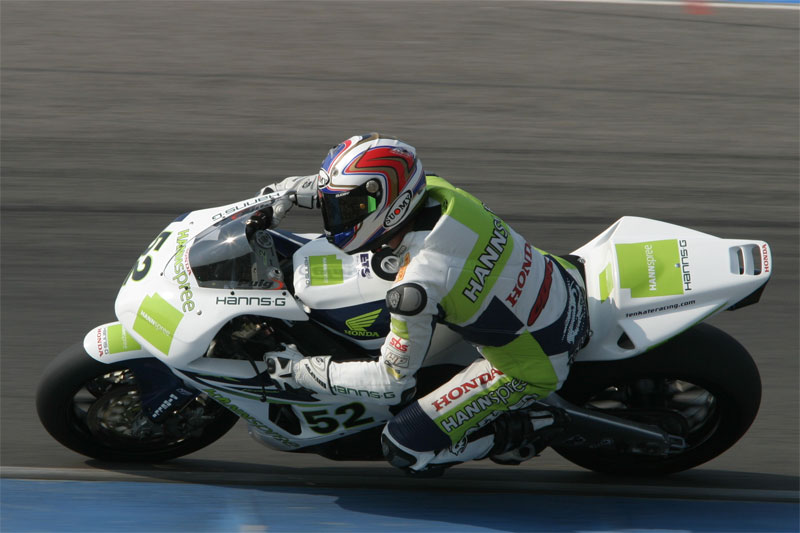
James Toseland at WK SBK Assen 2007

Toseland remained in WSBK for 2007 with Ten Kate Racing Honda, despite a firm offer from the Pramac d'Antin team to race in MotoGP. Toseland posted a first/second combination at the first meeting in Qatar, and at Phillip Island. He won one race in each of the first five meetings of the year. At Assen, he almost took a pair of wins but he was passed by Bayliss, losing by just 0.009 seconds. Toseland won his first ever World Superbike double at Brands Hatch on 5 August giving him a 66-point lead in the championship overall. In the final race at Magny-Cours, he claimed the 2007 World Superbike title with a pole position in qualifying, seventh position in race one, and a sixth place in race two, to leave him two points ahead of Japan's Noriyuki Haga.

Toseland became part of the Phil Burgan Race Academy (PBRA) – a programme for developing British talent in motorcycle sport – in 2007.

== MotoGP (2008–2009) ==
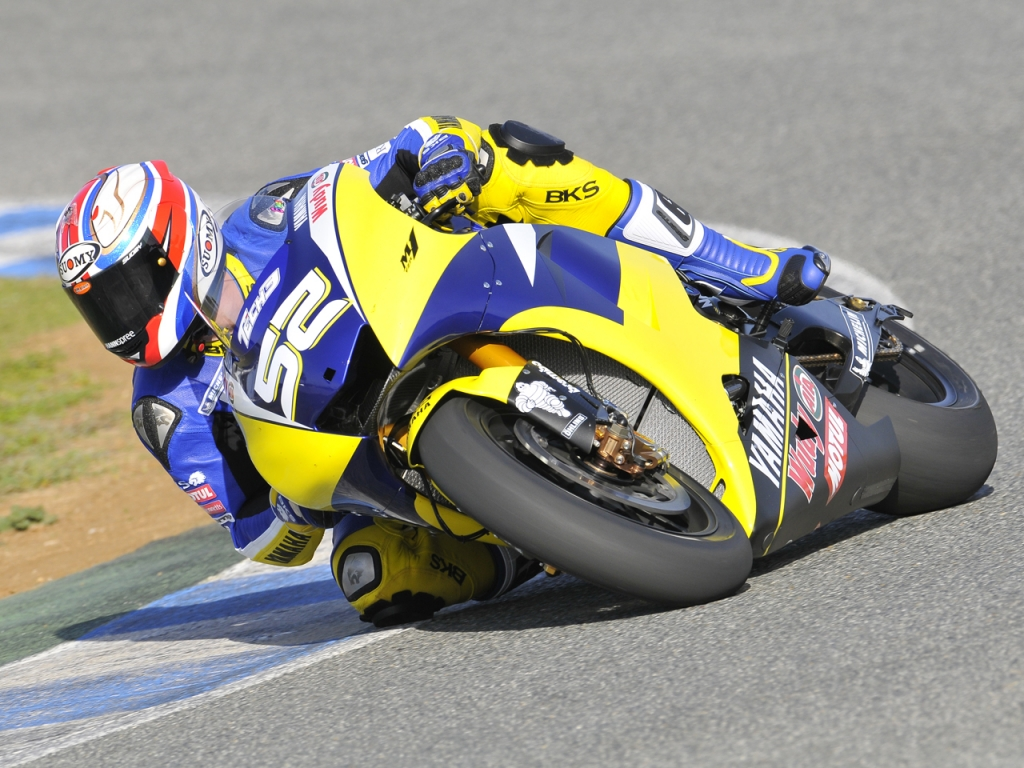
James Toseland riding the Yamaha Tech3 M1

Toseland was linked with the Pramac d'Antin MotoGP team, although rumours had also abounded of a ride with a Honda outfit, and even of Ten Kate Racing making the step up to the premier class and taking Toseland with them. However, Toseland confirmed a move to MotoGP for 2008 on 1 August 2007 when he announced that he had signed a one-year contract with factory supported Yamaha team Tech3. For 2008, Tech3 switched from Dunlop to Michelin tyres and it was confirmed that Toseland's teammate would be Colin Edwards. Toseland also signed a deal with British leathers company BKS to supply him with suits while competing in the 2008 MotoGP world championship.

Facing eight unknown tracks, Toseland had reason to expect a tough season, but he was immediately more competitive than originally anticipated. He qualified in second place and finished sixth in the opening race at Qatar on 9 March. He then qualified in eighth place and finished sixth at Jerez on 30 March despite suffering from bronchitis.

Fellow MotoGP riders Chris Vermeulen, Andrea Dovizioso and Casey Stoner complained about his aggressive riding style. Toseland stated that his moves were "hard but fair", and that it was his job to overtake his rivals when he had the chance to do so.

Before the British MotoGP round at Donington Park, Toseland said that if he were the first Briton to win in 27 years at the top level that he would strip naked on the ride back to the pits. However, he crashed in the first corner of the race, but picked his bike up to finish in 17th place, his worst finish of the season to that point, over a lap behind the winner Casey Stoner.

Toseland struggled through the middle part of the season for top ten finishes, achieving two ninth places (the Netherlands and the United States). One of his better showings was at Brno where he finished 13th, ahead of his teammate Colin Edwards. Amidst Bridgestone dominance, he was the third-highest finisher on Michelin tires, the first being Andrea Dovizioso placed in ninth. At Phillip Island, he ran third for a while but ultimately faded to sixth after frantic battles with the factory-supported Yamahas of Valentino Rossi and Jorge Lorenzo as well as Dovizioso and Shinya Nakano.

Overall, Toseland had a mixed first year in MotoGP, finishing 11th overall in the championship with 105 points. Inconsistency was one of the main problems as he was unable to record regular top-ten results despite having only two DNFs.

It was confirmed that Toseland would stay on for 2009 with the Tech3 Yamaha team, racing alongside Colin Edwards as he did in 2008. Yamaha also decided to continue its relationship with the Tech3 brand through to 2010.

In pre-season testing, Toseland suffered two major accidents, one with concussion. In 2008, Toseland had been unhappy with the communication with his engineer and his complaints led to a switch of crew chief with teammate Colin Edwards. Edwards resented this change and refused to speak with Toseland during the early rounds of the season. Despite the change in crew chief, Toseland only finished ahead of Edwards in two races for the year. Toseland also received jump-start penalties at the Laguna Seca and Phillip Island rounds, the former resulting in a disqualification.

On 1 October 2009, Yamaha officially confirmed that Spies would join Yamaha Tech3 to ride in the 2010 MotoGP championship, taking Toseland's place in the team. It was also announced before the Portuguese GP that Toseland would return to the Superbike World Championship.

== Return to Superbike World Championship – and retirement (2010–2011) ==
After losing his place at Tech3 Yamaha to Ben Spies, Toseland took over Spies' place at the Sterilgarda Yamaha World Superbike team for the 2010 Superbike World Championship season. His teammate was fellow British rider Cal Crutchlow. Toseland struggled to adapt to the new bike early in the season, only gaining four podium finishes going into the last two rounds of the season.

For 2011, after being offered a return to Ten Kate Honda, Toseland signed for the factory-backed BMW Motorrad Italia Team aboard the BMW S1000RR.

In September 2011, Toseland confirmed that, following the wrist injury sustained during a crash at Aragon in Spain, he would retire from racing immediately.

Toseland used his previous experience on the race track to help develop up-and-coming motorcycle racing stars of the future as part of his involvement with the Phil Burgan Race Academy. From 2012, Toseland stepped into a mentoring role, providing one-to-one support for the Academy's talented young motorcycle racers including Danny Kent and Sylvain Barrier.

In December 2012, Toseland announced he would attempt to break the motorcycle land speed world record in September 2014; this was delayed due to adverse weather and surface conditions. The streamliner that Toseland will ride for the attempt at the Bonneville Salt Flats in Utah, United States is powered by a Rolls-Royce jet engine and is called 'The 52 Express' after Toseland's racing number. The record attempt is led by former GP and TT sidecar competitor Alex Macfadzean.

== World Supersport management ==
For 2020, Toseland was confirmed as team manager of Wepol Racing based in the Czech Republic, with riders in World Supersport and Supersport 300. Wepol has backing from YART, and Toseland also acts as mentor to Wepol's rider Danny Webb, a former endurance racer.

== Music ==
Following the premature end of his racing career, Toseland returned his focus to his first love – music. After parting with his band Crash, he is now fronting a band simply named Toseland. The band's debut single: "Life is Beautiful" premiered online in April 2013.

The first album Renegade was released in 2014 and Toseland's first three releases, from the album, ("Life Is Beautiful", "Crash Landing" and "Renegade") all made it on to the A list on national radio stations and the album has received outstanding reviews. UK headline tours followed, along with special guest slots with Status Quo and Reef, at the Calling Festival with Aerosmith and various appearances in Europe.

The second album Cradle The Rage was released in March 2016, and was followed once again by tours all over the UK and Europe. Along with their own headline shows, the band hit the road supporting Deep Purple and Black Stone Cherry.

Toseland re-recorded the song "'We'll Stop At Nothing" from their Cradle The Rage album with the ChorusUK choir. The single became the official anthem for the Special Olympics GB 2017. In November 2017, Toseland announced that they had signed a deal with premier rock label Frontiers Records, and that they have begun work on their third album - as of 2023 this seems to have been shelved.

== Personal life ==
Toseland was nominated for the BBC Sports Personality of the Year Award in 2007. He demonstrated his piano virtuosity during the ceremony, performing a specially written solo blues/jazz piece.

Toseland was voted as the BBC Yorkshire Sports Personality of the Year in 2007.

Toseland was awarded an honorary doctorate from Sheffield Hallam University in 2009. He became a patron of the Sheffield Children’s Hospital Charity in 2012. Amongst his fundraising efforts he has taken part in the majority of the charity Easter Egg Runs where motorcyclists raise money and deliver soft toys chocolate treats to poorly children at the hospital.

In January 2012, Toseland announced his engagement to the singer Katie Melua. They were married on 1 September 2012, in the Nash Conservatory, at the Royal Botanic Gardens in Kew, London. In 2020 Melua revealed that the couple had separated.

== Racing career statistics ==
Notes:
(key) (Races in bold indicate pole position) (Races in italics indicate fastest lap)

=== All time ===
| Series | Years active | Races | Poles | Podiums | **Wins** | **2nd place** | **3rd place** | Fast Laps | Titles |
| World Supersport **(WSS)** | ^{1998–1999} | 17 | 0 | 0 | 0 | 0 | 0 | 0 | 0 |
| World Superbike **(SBK)** | ^{2001–07, 2010–2011} | 201 | 4 | 61 | 16 | 26 | 19 | 2 | 2 |
| MotoGP | ^{2008–09} | 34 | 0 | 0 | 0 | 0 | 0 | 0 | 0 |
| Total | | 252 | 4 | 61 | 16 | 26 | 19 | 2 | 2 |

=== Supersport World Championship ===
| Year | Make | 1 | 2 | 3 | 4 | 5 | 6 | 7 | 8 | 9 | 10 | 11 | Pos | Pts | Ref |
|---|---|---|---|---|---|---|---|---|---|---|---|---|---|---|---|
| 1998 | Honda | GBR | ITA | SPA | GER | SMR | RSA; 10 | USA; Ret | EUR; 8 | AUT; 12 | NED; Ret | | 19th | 18 | |
| 1999 | Honda | RSA; 6 | GBR; 8 | SPA; 11 | ITA; 9 | GER; 13 | SMR; 13 | USA; 11 | EUR; 7 | AUT; Ret | NED; 7 | GER; 22 | 11th | 59 | |

=== Superbike World Championship ===
| Year | Make | 1 | | 2 | | 3 | | 4 | | 5 | | 6 | | 7 | | 8 | | 9 | | 10 | | 11 | | 12 | | 13 | | Pos | Pts | Ref |
| Year | Make | R1 | R2 | R1 | R2 | R1 | R2 | R1 | R2 | R1 | R2 | R1 | R2 | R1 | R2 | R1 | R2 | R1 | R2 | R1 | R2 | R1 | R2 | R1 | R2 | R1 | R2 | Pos | Pts | Ref |
|---|---|---|---|---|---|---|---|---|---|---|---|---|---|---|---|---|---|---|---|---|---|---|---|---|---|---|---|---|---|---|
| 2001 | Ducati | ESP; Ret | ESP; 9 | RSA; 14 | RSA; Ret | AUS; 14 | AUS; C | JPN; 11 | JPN; 16 | ITA; Ret | ITA; Ret | GBR; 8 | GBR; Ret | GER; Ret | GER; 17 | SMR; 11 | SMR; 8 | USA; 10 | USA; 7 | EUR; 11 | EUR; 6 | GER; 10 | GER; 12 | NED; 10 | NED; 8 | ITA; Ret | ITA; DNS | 13th | 91 | |
| 2002 | Ducati | ESP; 12 | ESP; 10 | AUS; 8 | AUS; 7 | RSA; 6 | RSA; 8 | JPN; 9 | JPN; 11 | ITA; 5 | ITA; Ret | GBR; 10 | GBR; 9 | GER; 7 | GER; 7 | SMR; 8 | SMR; Ret | USA; 9 | USA; 6 | GBR; 9 | GBR; Ret | GER; 6 | GER; 8 | NED; 6 | NED; 3 | ITA; 6 | ITA; 6 | 7th | 195 | |
| 2003 | Ducati | ESP; 4 | ESP; 3 | AUS; Ret | AUS; 4 | JPN; 3 | JPN; 5 | ITA; 4 | ITA; 5 | GER; 3 | GER; 1 | GBR; 2 | GBR; 4 | SMR; 2 | SMR; Ret | USA; 3 | USA; Ret | GBR; 6 | GBR; 3 | NED; 4 | NED; Ret | ITA; Ret | ITA; Ret | **FRA**; 5 | **FRA**; 2 | | | **3rd** | **271** | |
| 2004 | Ducati | ESP; 1 | ESP; 2 | AUS; 3 | AUS; Ret | SMR; 10 | SMR; 6 | ITA; 2 | ITA; 2 | GER; 2 | GER; 2 | GBR; Ret | GBR; 5 | USA; 4 | USA; 7 | GBR; 2 | GBR; Ret | NED; 1 | NED; 2 | ITA; 3 | ITA; 2 | FRA; 1 | FRA; 2 | | | | | **1st** | **336** | |
| 2005 | Ducati | QAT; 6 | QAT; 6 | AUS; 14 | AUS; Ret | ESP; 8 | ESP; 19 | ITA; 3 | ITA; 5 | EUR; 3 | EUR; 1 | SMR; 4 | SMR; 4 | CZE; 2 | CZE; 8 | GBR; Ret | GBR; 7 | NED; 2 | NED; 3 | GER; 4 | GER; 11 | ITA; 4 | ITA; C | FRA; 3 | FRA; 6 | | | 4th | 254 | |
| 2006 | Honda | QAT; 1 | QAT; 4 | AUS; 3 | AUS; 2 | ESP; 9 | ESP; 11 | ITA; Ret | ITA; 5 | EUR; 3 | EUR; 3 | **SMR**; 2 | **SMR**; 8 | CZE; 2 | CZE; 5 | GBR; 2 | GBR; 5 | NED; 10 | NED; 9 | GER; 9 | GER; 1 | ITA; 2 | ITA; 5 | FRA; 1 | FRA; 3 | | | **2nd** | **336** | |
| 2007 | Honda | QAT; 2 | QAT; 1 | AUS; 2 | AUS; 1 | EUR; 1 | EUR; Ret | ESP; 5 | ESP; 1 | **NED**; 1 | **NED**; 2 | ITA; 4 | ITA; 2 | GBR; 8 | GBR; C | SMR; 4 | SMR; 6 | CZE; 1 | CZE; 2 | GBR; 1 | GBR; 1 | GER; 9 | GER; 4 | ITA; 3 | ITA; 11 | **FRA**; 7 | **FRA**; 6 | **1st** | **415** | |
| 2010 | Yamaha | AUS; Ret | AUS; 10 | POR; 7 | POR; 6 | SPA; 3 | SPA; 7 | NED; 2 | NED; 3 | ITA; 2 | ITA; Ret | RSA; 7 | RSA; 6 | USA; 9 | USA; Ret | SMR; 10 | SMR; Ret | CZE; 7 | CZE; 4 | GBR; 8 | GBR; 5 | GER; Ret | GER; 8 | ITA; Ret | ITA; Ret | FRA; Ret | FRA; Ret | 9th | 187 | |
| 2011 | BMW | AUS; 17 | AUS; 14 | GBR | GBR | NED | NED | ITA; DNS | ITA; DNS | USA; 15 | USA; DNS | SMR | SMR | SPA | SPA | CZE; WD | CZE; WD | GBR; 12 | GBR; 13 | GER; 13 | GER; Ret | ITA | ITA | FRA | FRA | POR | POR | 22nd | 13 | |

=== Grand Prix motorcycle racing results ===
| Year | Class | Bike | 1 | 2 | 3 | 4 | 5 | 6 | 7 | 8 | 9 | 10 | 11 | 12 | 13 | 14 | 15 | 16 | 17 | 18 | Pos | Pts |
|---|---|---|---|---|---|---|---|---|---|---|---|---|---|---|---|---|---|---|---|---|---|---|
| 2008 | MotoGP | Yamaha | QAT; 6 | SPA; 6 | POR; 7 | CHN; 12 | FRA; Ret | ITA; 6 | CAT; 6 | GBR; 17 | NED; 9 | GER; 11 | USA; 9 | CZE; 13 | SMR; 6 | INP; 18 | JPN; 11 | AUS; 6 | MAL; Ret | VAL; 11 | 11th | 105 |
| 2009 | MotoGP | Yamaha | QAT; 16 | JPN; 9 | SPA; 13 | FRA; 9 | ITA; 7 | CAT; 13 | NED; 6 | USA; DSQ | GER; 10 | GBR; 6 | CZE; 9 | INP; 6 | SMR; 10 | POR; 9 | AUS; 14 | MAL; 15 | VAL; 12 | | 14th | 92 |

== Bibliography ==
- Toseland, James; Macauley, Ted (1 May 2008). James Toseland: The Autobiography. Virgin Books. ISBN 978-0753513330.
