= 2009 British 125 Championship =

The 2009 British 125 Championship season was the 22nd British 125cc Championship season. The championship went down to the very last meetings at Oulton Park, James Lodge leading by 18 points from Martin Glossop with Rob Guiver 23 points behind; after Glossop fell, Lodge only had to finish 14th to take the title. Lodge took a 7th-place finish to secure the title while Guiver moved above Glossop into second place in the championship.

== Calendar ==
2009 Calendar
Round	Circuit	Date	Class	Pole position	Fastest lap	Winning rider	Winning team
1	(England) Brands Hatch Indy	April 13		(England) Martin Glossop	(England) Martin Glossop	(England) Martin Glossop	KRP/Bradley Smith Racing
1	(England) Brands Hatch Indy	April 13	C	(Scotland) Tim Hastings	(Scotland) Tim Hastings	(England) Harry Stafford	RCS/BTB
2	(England) Oulton Park	May 4		(England) Martin Glossop	(England) Shaun Horsman	(England) Martin Glossop	KRP/Bradley Smith Racing
2	(England) Oulton Park	May 4	C	(Scotland) Tim Hastings	(Scotland) Tim Hastings	(Scotland) Tim Hastings	KRP/Bradley Smith Racing
3	(England) Donington Park	May 25		(England) Martin Glossop	(England) Martin Glossop	(England) Martin Glossop	KRP/Bradley Smith Racing
3	(England) Donington Park	May 25	C	(Scotland) Tim Hastings	(Scotland) Tim Hastings	(Scotland) Taylor Mckenzie	MMCG Motorpoint
4	(England) Thruxton	May 31		(Northern Ireland) Paul Jordan	(Northern Ireland) Paul Jordan	(England) Brain Clark	Banks Racing/Express Racewear
4	(England) Thruxton	May 31	C	(England) Adam Blacklock	(Scotland) Tim Hastings	(Scotland) Tim Hastings	KRP/Bradley Smith Racing
5	(England) Snetterton	June 21		(England) Martin Glossop	(England) James Lodge	(Northern Ireland) Paul Jordan	KRP/Bradley Smith Racing
5	(England) Snetterton	June 21	C	(Scotland) Tim Hastings	(Scotland) Tim Hastings	(Scotland) Tim Hastings	KRP/Bradley Smith Racing
6	(Scotland) Knockhill	July 5		(England) Martin Glossop	(England) Martin Glossop	(England) James Lodge	KRP / Earnshaws Motorcycles
6	(Scotland) Knockhill	July 5	C	(Scotland) Tim Hastings	(Scotland) Tim Hastings	(Scotland) Deane Brown	Colin Appleyard / Macadam Racing
7	(England) Mallory Park	July 19		(England) Rob Guiver	(England) Connor Behan	(England) Rob Guiver	SP125 / RG Racing
7	(England) Mallory Park	July 19	C	(Scotland) Tim Hastings	(Scotland) Tim Hastings	(Scotland) Tim Hastings	KRP/Bradley Smith Racing
8	(England) Brands Hatch GP	August 9		(England) James Lodge	(England) Martin Glossop	(England) Rob Guiver	SP125 / RG Racing
8	(England) Brands Hatch GP	August 9	C	(England) Adam Blacklock	(England) Adam Blacklock	(England) Adam Blacklock	Repli-Cast UK
9	(England) Cadwell Park	August 31		(England) Rob Guiver	(England) Martin Glossop	(England) Martin Glossop	KRP/Bradley Smith Racing
9	(England) Cadwell Park	August 31	C	(Scotland) Deane Brown	(Scotland) Deane Brown	(Scotland) Deane Brown	Colin Appleyard / Macadam Racing
10	(England) Croft	September 13		(England) Martin Glossop	(Scotland) Robbie Stewart	(England) Connor Behan	SP125 / Express Forklifts
10	(England) Croft	September 13	C	(England) Danny Kent	(Scotland) Tim Hastings	(Scotland) Tim Hastings	KRP/Bradley Smith Racing
12	(England) Silverstone Arena GP	September 27		(England) Connor Behan	(England) Martin Glossop	(England) Rob Guiver	SP125 / RG Racing
12	(England) Silverstone Arena GP	September 27	C	(Scotland) Tim Hastings	(Scotland) Taylor Mackenzie	(Scotland) Taylor Mackenzie	MMCG Motorpoint
13	(England) Oulton Park	October 11		(England) Rob Guiver	(England) Brain Clark	(England) Brain Clark	Banks Racing/Express Racewear
13	(England) Oulton Park	October 11	C	(England) Adam Blacklock	(Scotland) Taylor Mackenzie	(Scotland) Deane Brown	Colin Appleyard / Macadam Racing

Icon	Class
C	ACU Academy Cup

== Championship standings ==
=== Riders' standings ===
Final 2009 Riders' Standings
Pos	Rider	Bike	BHI (England)	OUL (England)	DON (England)	THR (England)	SNE (England)	KNO (Scotland)	MAL (England)	BHGP (England)	CAD (England)	CRO (England)	SIL (England)	OUL (England)	Pts
1	(England) James Lodge	Honda	4	3	2	4	2	1	2	2	Ret	6	3	7	182
2	(England) Rob Guiver	Honda	7	2	Ret	7	7	2	1	1	8	Ret	1	2	170
3	(England) Martin Glossop	Seel	1	1	1	Ret	5	5	Ret	4	1	Ret	2	Ret	155
4	(England) Brain Clark	Honda			3	1	6	6	6	5	Ret	2	5	1	138
5	(Northern Ireland) Paul Jordan	Honda	5	Ret	8	3	1	12	Ret	8	6	10	8	8	104
6	(Scotland) Tim Hastings	Honda	Ret	6	11	2	3	11	3	18	7	3	10		103
7	(England) Connor Behan	Honda	6	5	Ret	6	Ret	3	Ret	Ret	3	1	Ret	6	98
8	(England) Tom Hayward	Honda	2	4	Ret	9	4	10	Ret	10	4	Ret	11	9	90
9	(Scotland) Deane Brown	Honda	Ret			16	12	7		9	2	5	7	3	76
10	(England) Adam Blacklock	Honda	Ret	Ret	13	8	9	18	7	3	5	7	Ret	4	76
11	(Scotland) Taylor Mackenzie	Honda	13		4		13	9		12	20	9		4	53
12	(England) Shaun Horsman	Honda	3	Ret	10	5	Ret	16	5	Ret	12	18	15	Ret	49
13	(Scotland) Robbie Stewart	Honda	Ret	12	Ret	14	Ret	4	4	6	Ret	Ret			42
14	(England) Catherine Green	Honda	10	8		15	11		14	17	13	11	12	12	38
15	(England) Ryan Saxelby	Honda	9	7		11	10	13				19		10	36
16	(England) Lee Costello	Honda	Ret	Ret	5	10	Ret	8	8						33
17	(England) Matthew Hoyle	Honda								11		4	6	Ret	28
18	(England) Harry Stafford	Honda	8							13	21	8	9	Ret	26
19	(England) Michael Hill	Honda	Ret	14	6	12	19	14	10	15	17	Ret	Ret	Ret	25
20	(Scotland) Peter Sutherland	Aprilia	19	10	9		8	Ret	Ret	Ret		13	Ret	Ret	24
21	(England) Edward Rendell	Honda	11	Ret		13	14			7					19
22	(England) Phillip Wakefield	Honda	12	11	18	19	16	15	Ret		9	16	14	17	19
23	(England) Matthew Paulo	Honda	21	21	7		21	20	12	Ret	19	Ret	Ret	Ret	13
24	(England) Sam Hornsey	Honda		9						19			21	11	12
25	(England) Danny Kent	Honda										Ret	Ret	5	11
26	(England) Tom Weeden	Honda	26	20		18	17	Ret	11	14	15	15	23	Ret	9
27	(England) Ross Walker	Honda	22	26	Ret	17	18	Ret	17	21	11	12	Ret	Ret	9
28	(England) Jon Vincent	Honda	15	Ret	11	22	22	19	Ret	22	14	14	20	19	9
29	(England) Corey Lewis	Honda	Ret		23	28			9		Ret		Ret	18	7
30	(England) Jay Lewis	Honda									10			15	7
31	(England) Shaun Winfield	Honda	14		20	21	Ret	Ret	13						5
32	(England) Rob Hodson	Honda		13										Ret	3
33	(Wales) Ian Lougher	Honda											13		3
34	(England) Luke Harvey	Honda	20	18	14	24	23								2
35	(Northern Ireland) Andy Reid	Honda		22	16					Ret			Ret	14	2
36	(Scotland) John McPhee	Honda	17	Ret	15	23	28	17	15	Ret				Ret	2
37	(England) Ben Barrett	Honda	24	15	22	27	20	22	16		18	17	16	22	1
38	(England) Jamie Mossey	Honda					15								1
Pos	Rider	Bike	BHI (England)	OUL (England)	DON (England)	THR (England)	SNE (England)	KNO (Scotland)	MAL (England)	BHGP (England)	CAD (England)	CRO (England)	SIL (England)	OUL (England)	Pts

Colour	Result
Gold	Winner
Silver	Second place
Bronze	Third place
Green	Points classification
Blue	Non-points classification
Blue	Non-classified finish (NC)
Purple	Retired, not classified (Ret)
Red	Did not qualify (DNQ)
Red	Did not pre-qualify (DNPQ)
Black	Disqualified (DSQ)
White	Did not start (DNS)
White	Withdrew (WD)
White	Race cancelled (C)
Blank	Did not practice (DNP)
Blank	Did not arrive (DNA)
Blank	Excluded (EX)

**Bold** – Pole
Italics – Fastest Lap
