= Régis Laconi =

French motorcycle racer

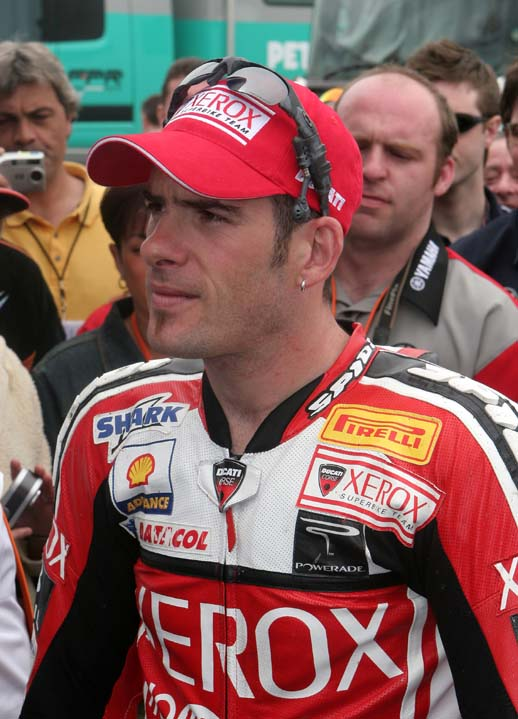
- Laconi in 2005
- Nationality: French
Motorcycle racing career statistics
Grand Prix motorcycle racing
Active years	1992, 1995 - 2000, 2002
First race	1992 125cc French Grand Prix
Last race	2002 500cc Valencia Grand Prix
First win	1999 500cc Valencia Grand Prix
Last win	1999 500cc Valencia Grand Prix
Team(s)	Aprilia, WCM Yamaha
Starts / Wins / Podiums / Poles / F. laps / Points; 100 / 1 / 2 / 1 / 0 / 427
Superbike World Championship
Active years	2001, 2003 - 2009
Manufacturers	Aprilia, Ducati, Kawasaki
2009 championship position	15th
Starts / Wins / Podiums / Poles / F. laps / Points; 173 / 11 / 28 / 7 / 10 / 1345

Régis Laconi (born 8 July 1975 in Saint-Dizier, Haute-Marne) is a French former professional motorcycle racer. In 2009, he competed in the Superbike World Championship for DFX on a Ducati. He was runner-up in 2004, and has won races in both Grand Prix in 500cc engine capacity classification and the Superbike World Championship.

== Early career ==
Laconi has a French mother and Italian father. He started racing in 1991 in the French 125cc championship. He won this title in 1992, the French 250cc title a year later, and the European 250cc champion in 1994. For 1995, he went to the 250cc World Championship, but was never a front-runner in his two seasons there.

== 500cc ==
1997 was Laconi's first season on a 500cc Grand Prix bike, but his World Championship season was marred by injury, missing four rounds after being run over twice in a first-turn incident at the A1 Ring. With Red Bull backing, he returned for 1998, riding a Yamaha for three years. He finished tenth, 11th and 12th in the series in this time, but won at Valencia in 1999

== Superbike World Championship ==
For 2001, Laconi was a factory Aprilia WSBK rider. He led the first lap of the season, but struggled for much of the season on circuits he did not know. Until the final round at Imola, his best result was a fourth, but he benefitted from knowing this circuit (which, like himself, was new to WSBK after being familiar in 500cc). He qualified second, and won the second race, after running strongly in race 1 before being taken out by a fall for champion Troy Bayliss. A move to MotoGP for 2002 was not successful, with a best result of eighth, so for 2003 he returned to WSBK for the Caracchi Ducati team, doing enough to earn a factory ride for 2004 by taking five podium finishes, finishing fourth in a relatively weakened championship.

Laconi and team-mate James Toseland were clear favourites for the 2004 title, which Toseland took at the final round of the season, in spite of Régis taking five poles and seven wins, and having what is seen as the stronger team of mechanics. His 2005 season was interrupted by injury, and for 2006 he switched to Kawasaki PSG-1 Corse. He finished the season behind his two team-mates in the championship, taking 15th place, with Chris Walker in ninth and Fonsi Nieto in tenth.

Laconi remained with the team for 2007 and finished 10th overall. He continued with the same team for 2008. At Misano, the team ran in a localised San Marino livery, but unfortunately, both he and team-mate Makoto Tamada crashed in race 1, forcing Laconi to run race 2 in the conventional green Kawasaki livery.

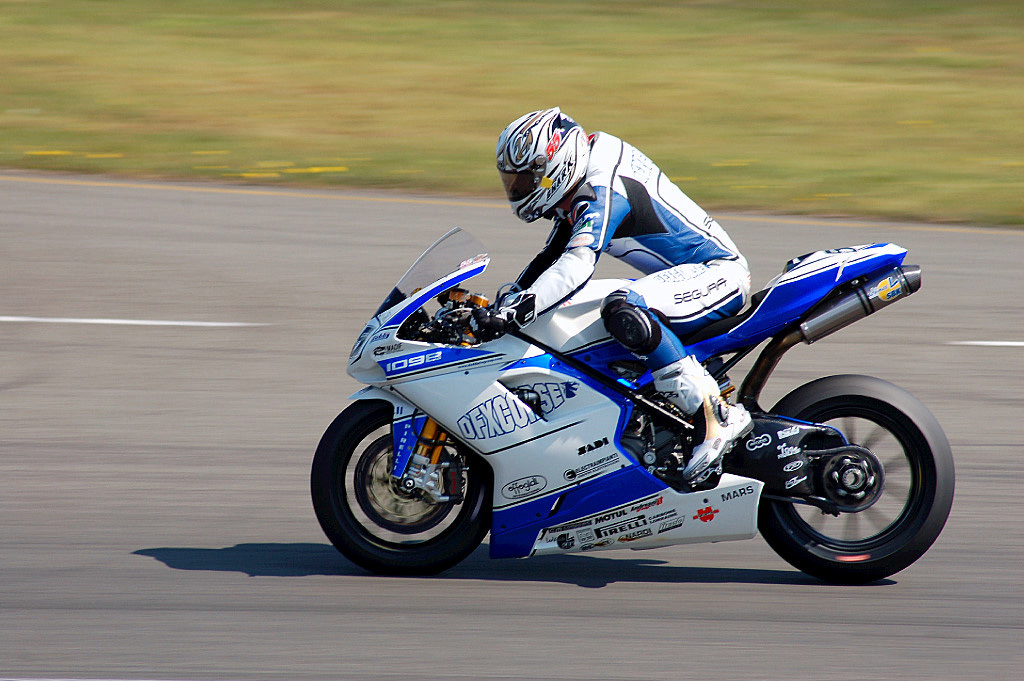
Laconi at the Assen round of the 2009 Superbike World Championship season

For 2009, Laconi switched to private Ducatis, riding the sole DFX machine. Results were strong early in the season, however he was seriously injured when he crashed heavily during the opening moments of the first practice of the Kyalami round of the World Superbike Championship. As of 20 May 2009, it was reported that Laconi awakened from his medically induced coma and is reported to have full movement in his arms, hands and legs. Laconi had undergone surgery to clasp his cervical vertebrae back together and it was expected he would remain immobile for some time.

Laconi returned for an exploratory test for the DFX Corse Ducati Team at Misano in June 2010 following his horrific crash at Kyalami in 2009. Regis had been training on his bicycle and after more than 70 laps with a best time of 1'37"800, he proved that his talent was still intact. But any thoughts of returning to racing for the moment are premature and totally groundless. The friendship that tied Laconi to team manager Daniele Carli enabled the test to take place.

== Career statistics ==
=== Grand Prix motorcycle racing ===
==== Races by year ====
(key) (Races in bold indicate pole position, races in italics indicate fastest lap)

Year	Class	Bike	1	2	3	4	5	6	7	8	9	10	11	12	13	14	15	16	Pos	Pts
1992	125cc	Honda	JPN	AUS	MAL	SPA	ITA	EUR	GER	NED	HUN	FRA; 26	GBR	BRA	RSA				NC	0
1995	250cc	Honda	AUS; Ret	MAL; 21	JPN; 15	SPA; 20	GER; Ret	ITA; 19	NED; Ret	FRA; Ret	GBR; 15	CZE; 21	BRA; Ret	ARG; 14	EUR; Ret				27th	4
1996	250cc	Honda	MAL; Ret	INA; 16	JPN; 14	SPA; Ret	ITA; 14	FRA; 11	NED; Ret	GER; 8	GBR; 7	AUT; 9	CZE; 16	IMO; Ret	CAT; 10	BRA; Ret	AUS; 12		15th	43
1997	500cc	Honda	MAL; 12	JPN; 12	SPA; 10	ITA; 10	AUT; Ret	FRA	NED	IMO	GER	BRA; 9	GBR; Ret	CZE; 7	CAT; 11	INA; 16	AUS; 5		14th	52
1998	500cc	Yamaha	JPN; DNS	MAL	SPA; 14	ITA; 10	FRA; 11	MAD; 7	NED; 9	GBR; 8	GER; 5	CZE; 9	IMO; 12	CAT; 8	AUS; 7	ARG; 6			10th	86
1999	500cc	Yamaha	MAL; 7	JPN; Ret	SPA; 7	FRA; 8	ITA; Ret	CAT; Ret	NED; 12	GBR; Ret	GER; 13	CZE; 9	IMO; 5	**VAL**; 1	AUS; 3	RSA; 14	BRA; 11	ARG; 12	11th	103
2000	500cc	Yamaha	RSA; 9	MAL; 9	JPN; 14	SPA; 8	FRA; 9	ITA; 7	CAT; 13	NED; 8	GBR; 12	GER; 7	CZE; 13	POR; 5	VAL; 6	BRA; 8	PAC; 11	AUS; 11	12th	106
2002	MotoGP	Aprilia	JPN; 8	RSA; 15	SPA; 14	FRA; 9	ITA; 8	CAT; 14	NED; Ret	GBR; 16	GER; Ret	CZE; 16	POR; Ret	BRA; Ret	PAC; 11	MAL; 17	AUS; Ret	VAL; Ret	19th	33

=== Superbike World Championship ===
==== Races by year ====
Year	Make	1		2		3		4		5		6		7		8		9		10		11		12		13		14		Pos.	Pts
Year	Make	R1	R2	R1	R2	R1	R2	R1	R2	R1	R2	R1	R2	R1	R2	R1	R2	R1	R2	R1	R2	R1	R2	R1	R2	R1	R2	R1	R2	Pos.	Pts
2001	Aprilia	SPA; 4	SPA; Ret	RSA; 8	RSA; 6	AUS; Ret	AUS; C	JPN; 14	JPN; 14	ITA; 5	ITA; 8	GBR; 12	GBR; 11	GER; 7	GER; 13	SMR; Ret	SMR; Ret	USA; 11	USA; 9	EUR; Ret	EUR; 11	GER; 8	GER; 5	NED; 9	NED; 7	ITA; Ret	ITA; 1			11th	152
2003	Ducati	SPA; 5	SPA; Ret	AUS; 6	AUS; 4	**JPN**; 2	**JPN**; 7	ITA; 2	ITA; 4	GER; 4	GER; 4	GBR; 4	GBR; 6	SMR; 3	SMR; 4	USA; Ret	USA; 4	GBR; 4	GBR; 8	NED; Ret	NED; 4	ITA; 3	ITA; 2	FRA; 6	FRA; 16					4th	267
2004	Ducati	**SPA**; Ret	**SPA**; Ret	**AUS**; 1	**AUS**; Ret	SMR; 1	SMR; 2	**ITA**; 1	**ITA**; 1	GER; 6	GER; 1	**GBR**; Ret	**GBR**; 3	USA; 5	USA; 3	EUR; 2	EUR; Ret	NED; 3	NED; 5	**ITA**; 1	**ITA**; 1	FRA; 3	FRA; 3							2nd	327
2005	Ducati	**QAT**; 3	**QAT**; 2	AUS; 7	AUS; 7	SPA; DNS	SPA; DNS	ITA; 4	ITA; 2	EUR; 1	EUR; Ret	SMR; 1	SMR; 1	CZE; 3	CZE; 7	GBR; 3	GBR; 5	NED; DNS	NED; DNS	GER	GER	ITA; 9	ITA; C	FRA; DNS	FRA; DNS					6th	221
2006	Kawasaki	QAT; 13	QAT; Ret	AUS; 13	AUS; 16	SPA; 8	SPA; 8	ITA; 7	ITA; Ret	EUR; 7	EUR; 14	SMR; 6	SMR; 19	CZE; Ret	CZE; 16	GBR; 9	GBR; 4	NED; Ret	NED; 8	GER; 12	GER; 19	ITA; 10	ITA; 10	FRA; 9	FRA; 18					15th	103
2007	Kawasaki	QAT; Ret	QAT; 11	AUS; Ret	AUS; Ret	EUR; 7	EUR; 6	SPA; 11	SPA; 8	NED; 16	NED; 10	ITA; Ret	ITA; 8	GBR; 5	GBR; C	SMR; 7	SMR; 11	CZE; 11	CZE; 14	GBR; 8	GBR; 9	GER; 6	GER; 11	ITA; 7	ITA; Ret	FRA; 9	FRA; 8			10th	137
2008	Kawasaki	QAT; 15	QAT; 16	AUS; Ret	AUS; 17	SPA; 8	SPA; 9	NED; 11	NED; 16	ITA; Ret	ITA; Ret	USA; Ret	USA; 9	GER; 14	GER; 10	SMR; Ret	SMR; Ret	CZE; Ret	CZE; Ret	GBR; Ret	GBR; 16	EUR; Ret	EUR; 15	ITA; 16	ITA; 9	FRA; 11	FRA; 20	POR; 10	POR; 10	16th	61
2009	Ducati	AUS; 7	AUS; 4	QAT; 10	QAT; 14	SPA; 4	SPA; 4	NED; 8	NED; 16	ITA; 8	ITA; 11	RSA	RSA	USA	USA	SMR	SMR	GBR	GBR	CZE	CZE	GER	GER	ITA	ITA	FRA	FRA	POR	POR	15th	77

=== MotoAmerica SuperBike Championship ===
==== By year ====
Year	Class	Team	1	2		3		4		5	6		7	8	9		10		11		Pos	Pts
Year	Class	Team	R1	R1	R2	R1	R2	R1	R2	R1	R1	R1	R1	R2	R1	R2	R1	R2	R1	R2	Pos	Pts
2004	SuperBike	Ducati	DAY	FON	FON	INF	INF	BAR	BAR	PPK	RAM	RAM	BRD	LAG	M-O	M-O	RAT	RAT	VIR; 5	VIR	39th	52

Sporting positions
Preceded by JJ Lehto; Tommi Mäkinen; Kari Tiainen	Race of Champions; Nations' Cup; 2000 with: Yvan Muller; Gilles Panizzi	Succeeded by Fernando Alonso; Jesús Puras; Rubén Xaus
