= 2009 British motorcycle Grand Prix =

(United Kingdom) 2009 British Grand Prix
Race details
- Race 10 of 17 races in the 2009 Grand Prix motorcycle racing season
- Date: 26 July 2009
- Official name: British Grand Prix
- Location: Donington Park
- Course: Permanent racing facility; 4.023 km (2.500 mi)

MotoGP
Pole position
- Rider: (Italy) Valentino Rossi
- Time: 1:28.116
Fastest lap
- Rider: (Spain) Jorge Lorenzo
- Time: 1:31.554
Podium
- First: (Italy) Andrea Dovizioso
- Second: (United States) Colin Edwards
- Third: (France) Randy de Puniet

250cc
Pole position
- Rider: (Spain) Héctor Barberá
- Time: 1:31.802
Fastest lap
- Rider: (Italy) Alex Baldolini
- Time: 1:34.963
Podium
- First: (Japan) Hiroshi Aoyama
- Second: (Spain) Álvaro Bautista
- Third: (Italy) Mattia Pasini

125cc
Pole position
- Rider: (United Kingdom) Bradley Smith
- Time: 1:37.442
Fastest lap
- Rider: (Spain) Julián Simón
- Time: 1:48.632
Podium
- First: (Spain) Julián Simón
- Second: (Italy) Simone Corsi
- Third: (United Kingdom) Scott Redding

The 2009 British motorcycle Grand Prix was the tenth round of the 2009 Grand Prix motorcycle racing season. It took place on the weekend of 24–26 July 2009 at Donington Park. It was to be the final motorcycle Grand Prix at Donington, with the race moving to Silverstone for the 2010 season.

== MotoGP race report ==
This race was most notable for the wet-weather conditions the race took place in, Andrea Dovizioso's shock win and Colin Edwards' and Randy de Puniet's shock podiums.

After nine rounds, Valentino Rossi is narrowly leading the title hunt with 176 points. A close second is Jorge Lorenzo with 162 points and a bit further back in third is Casey Stoner with 148 points.

Indicating the end of an era, this was to be the final race at the famous Donington Park circuit as it would be the Silverstone Circuit that would host the MotoGP race from 2010 onwards.

Valentino Rossi took pole position on Saturday - the fourth of the season - with a time of 1:28.116. Second is Dani Pedrosa who is +0.095 seconds behind and third is Rossi's teammate Jorge Lorenzo who is +0.286 behind. The second row of the grid consists out of Casey Stoner, Andrea Dovizioso and Colin Edwards in fourth, fifth and sixth place.

While the 250cc was a wet-dry race and it had stopped raining for a while, the rain started to fall again as soon as the pit lane was opened. The bikes are all going out on slicks on the sighting lap but many riders are uncertain given the now mixed conditions. Riders are also waiting for race control whether they will declare the race wet or dry. As the race is eventually declared 'wet', one rider who takes the gamble is Stoner, who has changed his tyres to full wets on both the front and the rear. Rossi chooses the Soft - Soft tyres, Pedrosa the Medium - Soft and Lorenzo also goes with the Soft - Soft combination. Stoner has the Rain - Rain combination instead.

All riders except Pedrosa get away without problems on the warm-up lap. The Spaniard needs help from his Repsol Honda team as his bike has stalled. Eventually, all the riders line up on their respective grid slots. As the lights go out, Rossi has a good start and maintains his lead heading into Redgate (Turn 1). His teammate Lorenzo swoops around the outside to dive into second position, Pedrosa fighting with Toni Elías though Redgate and Hollywood (Turn 2) for third place. Fifth is Dovizioso and sixth is Marco Melandri, who has gained one position from the start of the opening lap. The biggest loser is Stoner, who has lost five places and is now down in ninth position as it looks like his tyre gamble does not pay off for now. At the Craner Curves, Lorenzo takes a tighter line and passes Rossi for the lead, followed by a surprising Elías who not only manages to pass Pedrosa at the outside of Hollywood but also blasts past Rossi on the outside, outbraking him at the Old Hairpin (Turn 4). Entering Starkey's Bridge (Turn 5) and the Schwantz Curve (Turn 6), the duo at the front has now opened up a gap to Rossi already, though he manages to close it relatively quickly. Elías then dives down the inside of Lorenzo at McLean's (Turn 7), surprising the Spaniard and taking over at the front halfway into the first lap. Both Repsol Honda riders - Pedrosa and Dovizioso - then pass Rossi on the short straight before Coppice (Turn 8). 'The Doctor' has now been demoted from the lead of the race to fifth position in just half a lap. James Toseland makes a move at Starkey's Straight for sixth position as Pedrosa has a moment and runs wide upon entry of The Esses (Turn 9). This allows fourth place Dovizioso to try and take him around the outside but he rides upon a damp kerb and loses traction, not allowing him to make the move. At the Melbourne Hairpin Rossi lunges down the inside of Dovizioso and with Pedrosa avoiding the Italian, he passes both and moves up into third spot. Pedrosa then loses out to teammate Dovizioso as well, the Spaniard being demoted to fifth in just one turn. Behind him, Toseland also goes up the inside of Randy de Puniet, who has made progress from tenth on the grid, to overtake him for sixth position. At Goddards (Turn 11), Toseland goes up the inside of Pedrosa and takes fifth position from him, with Melandri doing likewise on de Puniet for seventh place.

On lap two, Pedrosa retakes fifth from Toseland at the Wheatcroft Straight. It now starts to rain at the start/finish straight, the conditions now really being mixed as another part of the circuit is still dry enough for slick tyres. At the Old Hairpin, Melandri goes up the inside of Toseland for fifth, running wide upon exit and gifting the place back to the Englishman. Dovizioso has closed up to Rossi and tries a very daring move down his inside at the entry of Starkey's Bridge, running on the damp kerb and having a moment as a result. This allows Rossi to keep his lead going into Schwantz Curve, Pedrosa trying to take fourth from him as well but failing. Elías, who by now has opened up a gap to second place Lorenzo, looks back at Starkey's Straight to see how far behind he is. Dovizioso has a look at the outside of Rossi but does not make a move.

Lap three and Pedrosa sets the fastest lap of the race. Stoner has dropped further down the order and is now in a lowly thirteenth place. Dovizioso again has a look up on the outside of Rossi upon entry of Redgate but decides to stay behind for now. Pedrosa has also opened up a gap to sixth place Toseland. At the Old Hairpin, Dovizioso goes up the inside of Rossi and snatches third place from him. He then overtakes Lorenzo for second at McLean's as well. Pedrosa then lines up a pass on Rossi as he takes a wider line going into Coppice, then goes up his inside at the exit of the corner and promotes himself up into third. At Starkey's Straight, Dovizioso then takes the lead as he goes side-by-side with and easily overtakes Elías. Lorenzo does likewise at the end of the straight, snatching second going into The Esses. Behind them, de Puniet also makes a lunge up the inside of Alex De Angelis and takes eighth place. At the Melbourne Hairpin, Pedrosa dives down the inside of Elías and overtakes him for third.

Lap four and Dovizioso sets the fastest lap of the race. By now, Stoner has dropped another two places and is fifteenth, behind Chris Vermeulen. Rossi is now right behind Eliás, stalking him for a few corners and then passing him for fourth spot at the Old Hairpin. Pedrosa has opened up a gap to Rossi, who was held up by Elías. Toseland is also being shadowed by Melandri and de Puniet at the exit of Coppice but neither makes a move at Starkey's Straight. Toseland now has created a train of four riders whom he is holding up, consisting of Melandri, de Puniet, de Angelis and Loris Capirossi.

On lap five, Lorenzo takes over at the front thanks to a dive down Dovizioso's inside at Redgate. Stoner has lost another position on the previous lap, being overtaken by Gábor Talmácsi and now lingering at the bottom in sixteenth position, only ahead of his teammate - also on rain tyres - which is Nicky Hayden.

Lap six and Pedrosa makes a move on teammate Dovizioso, going up his inside to pass him at Redgate and promote him up to second. Elías in fifth now has a gap of +1.707 seconds over sixth place Toseland. Lorenzo has opened up a gap to Pedrosa, who himself is now coming under pressure from Dovizioso, Rossi and Elías - who has closed the gap to the Italian.

On lap seven, Lorenzo is in the lead with Pedrosa chasing him. Elías is now losing ground to Rossi but still has a gap of +2.996 seconds back to de Puniet, who has passed Toseland for sixth. All the teams are warming up their second bikes, with the Ducati Marlboro Team preparing theirs with slick tyres whilst everyone else is preparing them with rain tyres. At the Old Hairpin, both Dovizioso and Rossi lunge past the inside of Pedrosa, demoting him from second to fourth in one corner. Elías has caught right up to the back of Pedrosa at Starkey's Bridge, stalking him but not making a move for now. Rossi then makes a pass on Dovizioso for second at the end of Starkey's Straight, entering The Esses ahead of him.

Lap eight and Rossi is now making up ground on teammate Lorenzo, taking Dovizioso with him. Eliás now has a +3.856 second gap back to de Puniet in sixth. Behind the trio, Elías passes Pedrosa for fourth at the exit of the Craner Curves. It is now drizzling on most parts of the circuit, making the conditions very tricky. This is shown when Elías goes a bit wide entering Starkey's Bridge, gets on the damp kerb, loses the bike and highsides out of contention and into the gravel at high speed. The Spanish rider walks away unhurt but disappointed as he is being assisted by a marshall, with the other marshalls removing his bike from the grass. Capirossi overtakes Toseland for seventh meanwhile. Melandri also passes Mika Kallio at the Melbourne Hairpin for eighth position, diving down his inside and hitting him slightly in the process.

On lap nine, Lorenzo gap back to Rossi is +0.449 seconds. The top six is as follows: Lorenzo, Rossi, Dovizioso, Pedrosa, de Puniet and de Angelis. Just before Lorenzo enters Goddards, he touches the white line and immediately loses the bike, sliding him out of contention. He runs to his bike to see if he can continue on, the marshalls checking it for him but upon realisation that it is damaged, he was away disappointed as a marshall assists him.

Lap ten and Rossi now leads in the tricky conditions, followed by Dovizioso in second. Pedrosa is in a lonely third, having dropped off the pace from the group a few laps ago.

On lap eleven, Dovizioso's gap back to teammate Pedrosa is +6.169 seconds. The Spaniard meanwhile is coming under threat from a rapidly closing de Puniet, who is only +1.181 seconds behind. Exiting Coppice and coming onto Starkey's Straight, de Puniet is very close to Pedrosa. At the end of the straight, the Frenchman goes up the inside of Pedrosa, taking third from him at The Esses. Toseland has also passed Capirossi and is up into sixth place.

Lap twelve and the gap Dovizioso has to de Puniet is +8.994 seconds. Pedrosa then retakes third by going up the inside of de Puniet at Redgate. Entering the Old Hairpin, it is de Puniet's turn as he repasses Pedrosa and retakes the position. The rain in the pitlane is now intensifying and a big, dark cloud is slowly moving towards the circuit. At Starkey's Straight, Pedrosa closes up on de Puniet again but does not make a move at the entrance of The Esses. At the short straight before the Melbourne Hairpin however, he blasts past and takes back third place.

On lap thirteen, the second bikes in the pit lane are being readied just in case the riders decide to enter. Rossi is still leading, followed by Dovizioso. De Puniet has also overtaken Pedrosa for third, taking the position by going up the inside at the entrance of Starkey's Bridge.

Lap fourteen and Pedrosa blasts past de Puniet again at the exit of the Wheatcroft Straight, retaking the position in the process. De Puniet then tries to fight back around the outside but the Spaniard pushes him wide onto the kerb, forcing him to stay behind. Rossi's gap back to Dovizioso is +0.341 seconds and the top six is as follows: Rossi, Dovizioso, Pedrosa, de Puniet, de Angelis and Toseland. At the exit of Hollywood and the entrance of the Craner Curves, the Frenchman stays right behind Pedrosa and manages to sneak up his inside to take third back again. At the front, the duo of Rossi and Dovizioso now lap the struggling Ducati's of Stoner and Hayden.

On lap fifteen - the halfway point of the race -, Dovizioso is now right behind Rossi who is still in the lead. After overtaking Pedrosa, de Puniet is now slowly starting to ride away from him.

Lap sixteen and Dovizioso now has a whopping +12.854 second gap back to Pedrosa, who has repassed de Puniet. Further back, de Puniet has a +2.334 second gap back to de Angelis. Dovizioso is now all over the back of Rossi but does not make a move on him.

On lap seventeen, Rossi has a +0.112 second gap to Dovizioso. Pedrosa now has opened up his own gap to de Puniet as de Angelis laps Hayden. Colin Edwards meanwhile has moved up the order and is now seventh, behind teammate Toseland. At Redgate, Kallio dives down the inside of Capirossi and snatches eighth place from him. The group of Toseland, Edwards, Kallio, Capirossi and Melandri all lap a struggling Stoner at Hollywood and the Craner Curves as he slows down. At Starkey's Bridge, Edwards closes right up on Toseland, easily overtaking him for sixth spot at McLean's. At the entrance of The Esses, Capirossi outbrakes Kallio and retakes eighth position exiting the chicane. Melandri then tries a move up the inside but fails as Capirossi blocks him and Kallio tries to get back at the Italian around the outside.

Lap eighteen and Kallio passes both Capirossi and Toseland, shooting past at Redgate and taking seventh. At the Old Hairpin, Melandri then dives down Capirossi's inside and snatches ninth place from him. The rain is now slowly intensifying, making the conditions even trickier than before. At the entrance of The Esses, Melandri goes a bit wide as he has a slight moment but doesn't lose too much time or any positions as a result of it.

On lap nineteen, Dovizioso has an +11.893 second gap back to de Puniet as Rossi is still ahead, being harassed by him all throughout the lap.

Lap twenty and the gap Dovizioso has to de Puniet has decreased, it now only being +10.618 seconds. His gap back to Pedrosa has increased however to +2.105 seconds after overtaking him. Sixth place Edwards has meanwhile also caught up to de Angelis and is all over the back of him. In the middle of The Esses, Rossi then loses the rear of his bike and slides out of the lead, gifting Dovizioso first place and a wide gap back to second. He immediately runs to his bike to try and get it restarted, the marshalls helping him get it pushed and lucky for him, the bike does restart and he is able to continue on, albeit being overtaken by multiple riders by now.

On lap twenty-one Dovizioso leads the race as de Puniet is now starting to chase him down, Pedrosa being in third. Rossi rejoins behind of Canepa in eleventh and begins his hunt to salvage his race.

Lap twenty-two and Rossi has it all to do as Dovizioso is out in front, de Puniet still closing down on him. The rain in pit lane is now intensifying which makes the circuit more slippery. Rossi is now slowly catching up to the rear of

On lap twenty-three, Dovizioso has a +12.571 seconds back to de Puniet. Edwards has passed de Angelis for fourth right now and is only +1.284 seconds adrift of third place Pedrosa by now. De Angelis' gap back to Toseland is +5.051 seconds. Seventh place Melandri has entered the pits, as well as Capirossi to change bikes. Rossi is now only +2.096 seconds behind tenth place Kallio. At Hollywood, Edwards passes a now struggling Pedrosa and moves up third. Not far behind is de Angelis, who also manages to overtake the Spaniard at the entrance of Starkey's Bridge around the outside, him almost losing his bike as he has a moment. Vermeulen has also entered the pits to swap bikes.

Lap twenty-four and Dovizios is still out in front, taking the gamble by staying out and going slowly to avoid falling like his rivals Rossi and Lorenzo have done. Kallio has entered the pits to swap bikes The top six is now as follows: Dovizioso, de Puniet, Edwards, de Angelis, Pedrosa and Toseland. As Kallio rejoins, Melandri passes him as well and is now ninth.

On lap twenty-five, Edwards is now rapidly closing up on de Puniet and is taking de Angelis with him. Pedrosa is now being hounded by Niccolò Canepa's Pramac Racing Ducati for seventh. Rossi meanwhile is ahead of the Spaniard in sixth thanks to the riders in front all pitting for wet weather tyres. At The Esses, de Puniet also loses the rear of his bike but manages to catch it just in time.

Lap twenty-six and Dovizioso's gap to de Puniet is +7.811 seconds. This decreases to +7.288 seconds in sector one, decreasing again in sector two to +5.654 seconds. Edwards has now closed up even more on de Puniet as the gap Dovizioso has to the Frenchman drops again in sector three to +4.409 seconds.

On lap twenty-seven, Dovizioso's gap to de Puniet is now +4.011 seconds. Edwards' gap to de Angelis is +1.261 seconds and Toseland's gap to Rossi is +4.332 seconds. Edwards has quickly caught de Puniet and is right up on his rear at Coppice. Dovizioso's gap back to de Puniet has decreased to +3.477 seconds in sector one, then to +2.609 seconds in sector two. In sector three, the gap shrinks even further to +1.464 seconds. De Puniet has a look back to see where Edwards is exiting the Melbourne Hairpin.

Lap twenty-eight and Dovizioso's gap to de Puniet is only +1.660 seconds. At the Wheatcroft Straight, Edwards is right behind the Frenchman but does not make a move entering Redgate. Edwards has a +2.611 second gap back to de Angelis as Toseland's gap to Rossi has now increased to +3.967 seconds. At the Old Hairpin, Edwards goes up the inside of de Puniet and takes second from him. Dovizioso's gap to Edwards was +1.723 seconds at the beginning of the lap and has since dropped to +1.594 in sector two, +1.179 seconds in sector two and +0.987 seconds in sector three. De Puniet then dives down the inside of Edwards at the Melbourne Hairpin, taking second from him as they tiptoe into the corner.

On lap twenty-nine, the penultimate lap of the race, Dovizioso's gap to de Puniet has now increased slightly to +1.410 seconds. Edwards' gap to de Angelis is now +3.759 seconds and Toseland's gap back to Rossi is +3.408 seconds. Pedrosa has also been passed by Canepa as he moves up to seventh. In sector one, Dovizioso's gap to de Puniet has shrunk to +1.196 seconds and shrinks again in sector two - it now only being +0.880 seconds. However, the gap in sector three increases again to +0.995 seconds.

Dovizioso crosses the line to start the final lap - lap thirty - and his gap to de Puniet has increased to +1.409 seconds. Edwards closes up on the Frenchman exiting Coppice. Rossi makes a very late lunge up the inside of Toseland at the end of Starkey's Straight, initially taking fifth but running wide entering The Esses, allowing Toseland to retake the place upon exit. Edwards meanwhile passes de Puniet at the final corner - Goddards - by diving up his inside in a do-or-die pass and snatches second from him. Dovizioso meanwhile has no troubles and crosses the line to win the race - his first ever win in the MotoGP class. A close second is Edwards and a celebratory de Puniet, who does a big wheelie, comes home third. A bit further behind is de Angelis in fourth, also doing a wheelie. Fifth is Rossi who managed to overtake Toseland making a do-or-die lunge up his inside at the Melbourne Hairpin, with the Brit coming home in sixth spot.

On the parade lap back to parc-fermé, an ecstatic Dovizioso celebrates by punching up in the air multiple times. As he rides back, many fans have invaded the track and are cheering him on, waving at them and the fans in the grandstands. Rossi talks to Dovizioso whilst still on the bike, then shaking hands and Rossi happily waving at the crowd. Dovizioso casually waves at the fans standing on the track, the marshalls keeping them from swarming them and Pedrosa - who has now come next to him and rides ahead of him. Toseland, who has finished sixth, gets many applauses and cheers, many fans also giving him a pat on the arm and back.

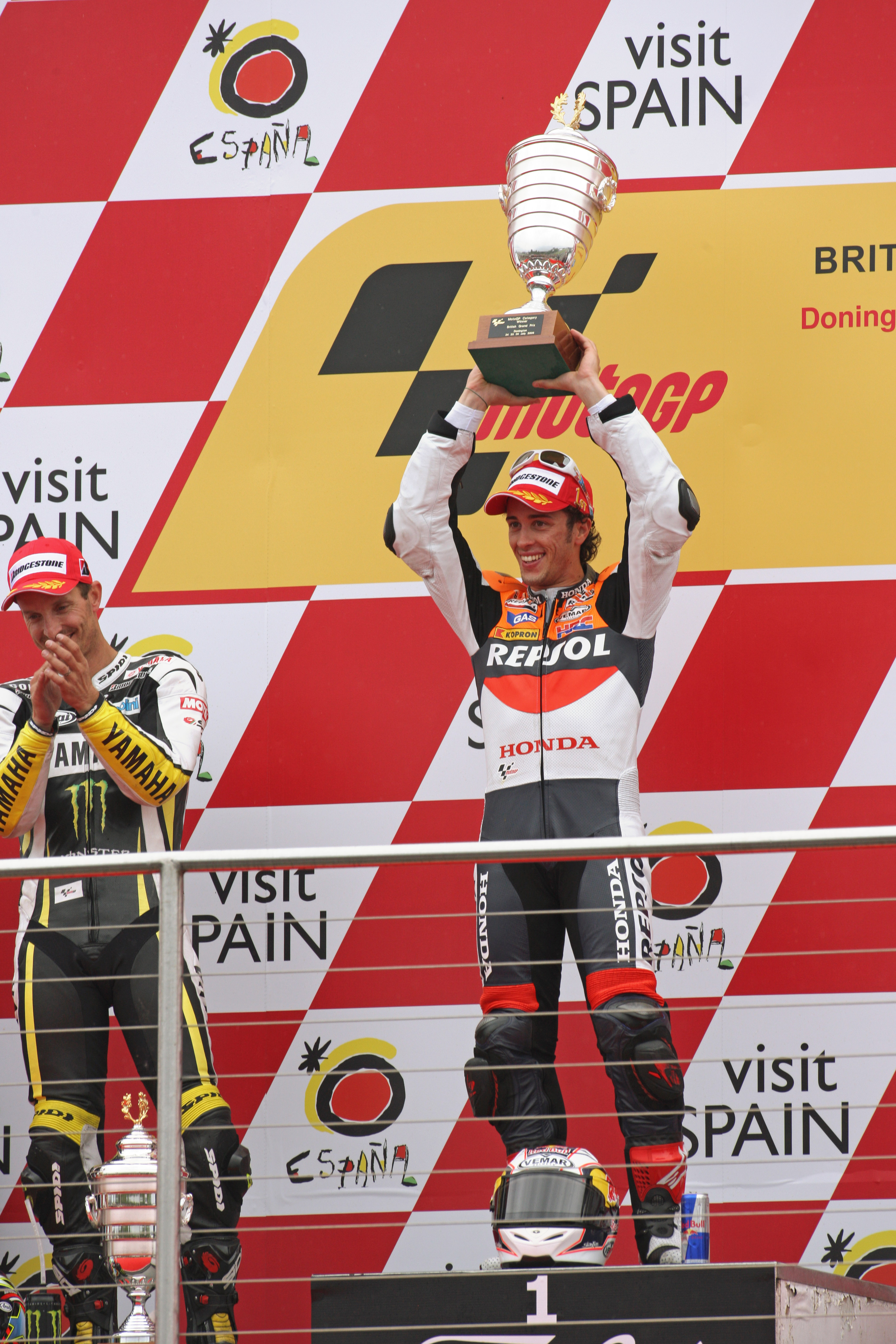
Andrea Dovizioso, lifting his trophy to celebrate his first ever surprise victory in the MotoGP race.

De Puniet is the first to arrive back at parc-fermé, being hugged by one of his LCR Honda crewmembers before stepping off. Another one then gleefully hugs him as the Frenchman still has the French flag in his hands, running to his crew to celebrate as well. Edwards is the second person to arrive at parc-fermé, his team clapping for him as he takes off his helmet and puts on his cap, then steps off a puts his thumb in the air. He then celebrates with his team. Last is race winner Dovizioso who arrives at parc-fermé, the Repsol Honda crew congratulating him on his maiden win. He steps off the bike, then calmly walks over to his crew as they all hug him in joy. Dovizioso then talks to his team as de Puniet behind him gets interviewed by the press. All the riders by now are being interviewed by the media as Toseland takes his time to greet all the home fans and greet them.

All the riders make their way onto the podium, Dovizioso and de Puniet having a quick chat before the Frenchman steps on the podium, followed by Edwards and Dovizioso. All the riders shake hands and Simon Gillett, then CEO of Donington Park Leisure ltd, hands out the third place trophy to de Puniet, who lifts it up in glee. Next up is Jorge Viegas, a representative of FIM to hand out the second place trophy to Edwards. The crowd cheers loudly as his name is mentioned and he receives the trophy, cheekily sticking out his tongue as he raises the trophy to signify the victory. Then it's the turn of Jean Mesquida, Spanish Minister for Tourism, to hand out the winners trophy to a delighted Dovizioso, lifting the big trophy up his head as he smiles. The Italian national anthem plays for Dovizioso and as it stops, the podium girls hand out the champagne. De Puniet immediately sprays the crowd upon receiving it, followed by Edwards and then Dovizioso before they spray each other. They then toast their champagne bottles before drinking some out of it. The riders climb upon the podium and pose for the group photo.

Despite Rossi crashing out from the lead and only finishing fifth, Lorenzo's retirement and Stoner's fourteenth position means that 'The Doctor' extends his lead in the championship. He has 187 points, followed by Lorenzo with 162 points in second and Stoner in third with 150 points.

== MotoGP classification ==
Pos.	No.	Rider	Team	Manufacturer	Laps	Time/Retired	Grid	Points
1	4	(Italy) Andrea Dovizioso	Repsol Honda Team	Honda	30	48:26.267	5	25
2	5	(United States) Colin Edwards	Monster Yamaha Tech 3	Yamaha	30	+1.360	6	20
3	14	(France) Randy de Puniet	LCR Honda MotoGP	Honda	30	+1.600	10	16
4	15	(San Marino) Alex De Angelis	San Carlo Honda Gresini	Honda	30	+8.958	12	13
5	46	(Italy) Valentino Rossi	Fiat Yamaha Team	Yamaha	30	+21.622	1	11
6	52	(United Kingdom) James Toseland	Monster Yamaha Tech 3	Yamaha	30	+22.465	9	10
7	33	(Italy) Marco Melandri	Hayate Racing Team	Kawasaki	30	+35.284	7	9
8	88	(Italy) Niccolò Canepa	Pramac Racing	Ducati	30	+38.769	16	8
9	3	(Spain) Dani Pedrosa	Repsol Honda Team	Honda	30	+42.112	2	7
10	36	(Finland) Mika Kallio	Pramac Racing	Ducati	30	+45.845	11	6
11	65	(Italy) Loris Capirossi	Rizla Suzuki MotoGP	Suzuki	30	+53.190	14	5
12	41	(Hungary) Gábor Talmácsi	Scot Racing Team MotoGP	Honda	30	+1:12.315	17	4
13	7	(Australia) Chris Vermeulen	Rizla Suzuki MotoGP	Suzuki	30	+1:20.398	13	3
14	27	(Australia) Casey Stoner	Ducati Marlboro Team	Ducati	29	+1 lap	4	2
15	69	(United States) Nicky Hayden	Ducati Marlboro Team	Ducati	29	+1 lap	15	1
Ret	99	(Spain) Jorge Lorenzo	Fiat Yamaha Team	Yamaha	8	Accident	3	
Ret	24	(Spain) Toni Elías	San Carlo Honda Gresini	Honda	7	Accident	8	

== 250 cc classification ==
Pos.	No.	Rider	Manufacturer	Laps	Time/Retired	Grid	Points
1	4	(Japan) Hiroshi Aoyama	Honda	27	45:17.516	3	25
2	19	(Spain) Álvaro Bautista	Aprilia	27	+5.723	6	20
3	75	(Italy) Mattia Pasini	Aprilia	27	+36.161	7	16
4	58	(Italy) Marco Simoncelli	Gilera	27	+36.776	2	13
5	63	(France) Mike Di Meglio	Aprilia	27	+41.418	5	11
6	6	(Spain) Alex Debón	Aprilia	27	+41.938	4	10
7	35	(Italy) Raffaele De Rosa	Honda	27	+57.483	11	9
8	40	(Spain) Héctor Barberá	Aprilia	27	+59.975	1	8
9	12	(Switzerland) Thomas Lüthi	Aprilia	27	+1:14.852	12	7
10	55	(Spain) Héctor Faubel	Honda	27	+1:16.927	14	6
11	16	(France) Jules Cluzel	Aprilia	27	+1:21.356	15	5
12	52	(Czech Republic) Lukáš Pešek	Aprilia	27	+1:21.665	10	4
13	15	(Italy) Roberto Locatelli	Gilera	27	+1:29.576	13	3
14	17	(Czech Republic) Karel Abraham	Aprilia	26	+1 lap	9	2
15	48	(Japan) Shoya Tomizawa	Honda	26	+1 lap	17	1
16	25	(Italy) Alex Baldolini	Aprilia	26	+1 lap	16	
17	10	(Hungary) Imre Tóth	Aprilia	26	+1 lap	18	
18	64	(United Kingdom) Luke Mossey	Aprilia	26	+1 lap	24	
19	53	(France) Valentin Debise	Honda	25	+2 laps	21	
20	7	(Spain) Axel Pons	Aprilia	25	+2 laps	19	
21	77	(Spain) Aitor Rodríguez	Aprilia	25	+2 laps	25	
22	8	(Switzerland) Bastien Chesaux	Honda	25	+2 laps	23	
23	54	(United Kingdom) Toby Markham	Aprilia	23	+4 laps	26	
Ret	14	(Thailand) Ratthapark Wilairot	Honda	18	Retirement	8	
Ret	95	(Germany) Ralf Waldmann	Aprilia	5	Retirement	20	
Ret	11	(Hungary) Balázs Németh	Aprilia	0	Retirement	22	
DNQ	68	(United Kingdom) Alex Kenchington	Yamaha		Did not qualify		
DNQ	67	(Sweden) Robin Hålén	Aprilia		Did not qualify		
OFFICIAL 250cc REPORT

== 125 cc classification ==
The 125cc race was stopped after 13 full laps due to rain. It was later restarted for 5 additional laps, with the grid determined by the running order before the suspension. The second part of the race determined the final result.

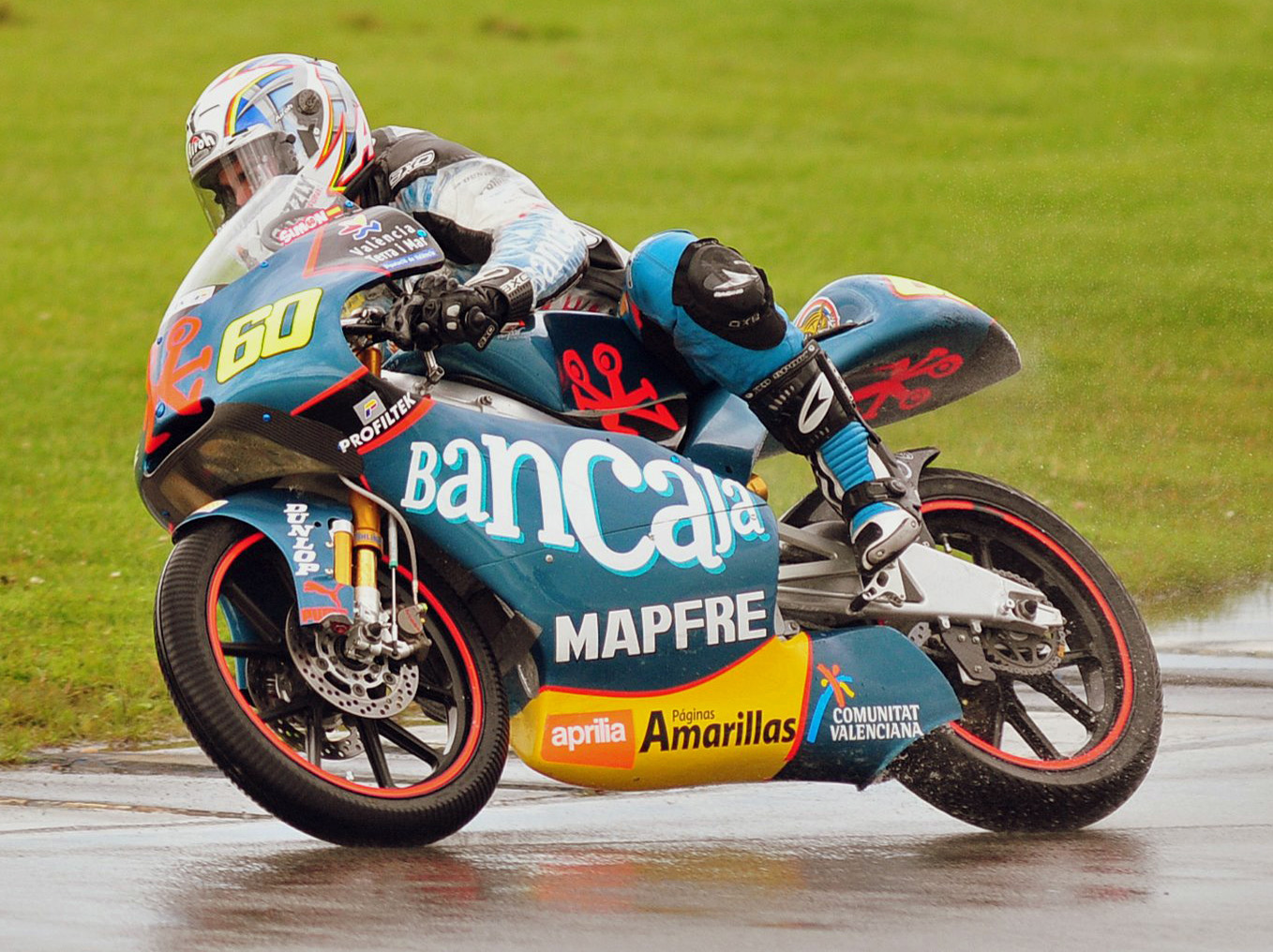
Julián Simón, riding his Aprilia in the 125cc race, which he went on to win.

Pos.	No.	Rider	Manufacturer	Laps	Time/Retired	Grid	Points
1	60	(Spain) Julián Simón	Aprilia	5	9:12.301	3	25
2	24	(Italy) Simone Corsi	Aprilia	5	+0.390	12	20
3	45	(United Kingdom) Scott Redding	Aprilia	5	+3.072	11	16
4	18	(Spain) Nicolás Terol	Aprilia	5	+6.209	6	13
5	73	(Japan) Takaaki Nakagami	Aprilia	5	+9.509	20	11
6	39	(Spain) Luis Salom	Aprilia	5	+11.211	24	10
7	8	(Italy) Lorenzo Zanetti	Aprilia	5	+11.572	22	9
8	77	(Switzerland) Dominique Aegerter	Derbi	5	+13.703	18	8
9	7	(Spain) Efrén Vázquez	Derbi	5	+14.101	16	7
10	44	(Spain) Pol Espargaró	Derbi	5	+15.422	7	6
11	71	(Japan) Tomoyoshi Koyama	Loncin	5	+17.905	19	5
12	6	(Spain) Joan Olivé	Derbi	5	+25.625	5	4
13	14	(France) Johann Zarco	Aprilia	5	+26.793	23	3
14	91	(United Kingdom) Martin Glossop	Honda	5	+27.916	31	2
15	93	(Spain) Marc Márquez	KTM	5	+28.631	2	1
16	92	(Republic of Ireland) Paul Jordan	Honda	5	+28.999	35	
17	69	(Czech Republic) Lukáš Šembera	Aprilia	5	+30.564	32	
18	35	(Switzerland) Randy Krummenacher	Aprilia	5	+34.468	21	
19	87	(Italy) Luca Marconi	Aprilia	5	+38.709	33	
20	38	(United Kingdom) Bradley Smith	Aprilia	5	+38.938	1	
21	10	(Italy) Luca Vitali	Aprilia	5	+1:14.040	36	
Ret	53	(Netherlands) Jasper Iwema	Honda	4	Accident	25	
Ret	32	(Italy) Lorenzo Savadori	Aprilia	1	Accident	26	
Ret	5	(France) Alexis Masbou	Loncin	1	Accident	28	
Ret	88	(Austria) Michael Ranseder	Aprilia	1	Accident	17	
Ret	90	(United Kingdom) Timothy Hastings	Honda	0	Did not restart	34	
Ret	89	(United Kingdom) James Lodge	Honda	0	Did not restart	30	
Ret	33	(Spain) Sergio Gadea	Aprilia	0	Accident in 1st race	4	
Ret	12	(Spain) Esteve Rabat	Aprilia	0	Retirement in 1st race	9	
Ret	16	(United States) Cameron Beaubier	KTM	0	Retirement in 1st race	27	
Ret	17	(Germany) Stefan Bradl	Aprilia	0	Retirement in 1st race	13	
Ret	99	(United Kingdom) Danny Webb	Aprilia	0	Retirement in 1st race	14	
Ret	11	(Germany) Sandro Cortese	Derbi	0	Accident in 1st race	8	
Ret	29	(Italy) Andrea Iannone	Aprilia	0	Accident in 1st race	10	
Ret	86	(Czech Republic) Karel Pešek	Derbi	0	Accident in 1st race	29	
Ret	94	(Germany) Jonas Folger	Aprilia	0	Accident in 1st race	15	
OFFICIAL 125cc REPORT

== Championship standings after the race (MotoGP) ==
Below are the standings for the top five riders and constructors after round ten has concluded.

Riders' Championship standings

Pos.	Rider	Points
1	(Italy) Valentino Rossi	187
2	(Spain) Jorge Lorenzo	162
3	(Australia) Casey Stoner	150
4	(Spain) Dani Pedrosa	115
5	(United States) Colin Edwards	103

Constructors' Championship standings

Pos.	Constructor	Points
1	(Japan) Yamaha	230
2	(Japan) Honda	164
3	(Italy) Ducati	156
4	(Japan) Suzuki	89
5	(Japan) Kawasaki	79

- Note: Only the top five positions are included for both sets of standings.

Previous race: 2009 German Grand Prix	FIM Grand Prix World Championship; 2009 season	Next race: 2009 Czech Republic Grand Prix
Previous race: 2008 British Grand Prix	British motorcycle Grand Prix	Next race: 2010 British Grand Prix
