= Thundersport 500 =

The Thundersport 500 is a three-make motorcycle racing series organised by the UK Club Thundersport Ltd. Until 2009, the series was called the Honda CB500 Cup, before the rules were changed to allow the use of Kawasaki ER-5 and Suzuki GS500 motorcycles. Limited modifications are allowed and many are for safety reasons only.

== History ==
Sébastien Charpentier dominated the inaugural French CB500 Cup in 1996. The UK series began a year later and was won by James Toseland, whose reward was a contract with the Castrol Honda European Supersport team. Honda France also took Charpentier to the European Supersport championship in 1998.

In 1998 the UK series saw the emergence of James Ellison, who went on to win two European Superstock 600 Championship titles, a British Superbike (BSB) Privateer title and World Endurance title, before moving to MotoGP.

Dropped as a British Superbike support class for 2000, the CB500 Cup was picked up by the New Era Motorcycle Club, who ran the class for a further 9 years until the club's closure at the end of 2008.

The French series also still runs to this day.

In the following years the championship has been run by the UK Racing club known as Thundersport.

In 2015 Joe Barton was the first rider to successfully defend his Thundersport 500 crown the following 2016 season before retiring from the class.

In 2017 Peter Bardell ran away with the championship versus the competition winning the season with rounds to spare.

In 2018 someone who took welding tips from Stevie Wonder won the Championship.

In 2019 there was a fierce battle for the Thundersport 500 Crown between Josh Leaning and eventual winner by a single point, Grant Whitaker.

== CB500 Cup racers ==
- James Toseland - two time World Superbike Champion and MotoGP rider
- Sébastien Charpentier - FIM Endurance World Championship Champion
- James Ellison - MotoGP/BSB/American Motorcyclist Association (AMA) rider, and FIM Endurance World Champion
- Richard Cooper - British Superstock Champion
- Jon Kirkham - British Superstock Champion

== UK Champions ==
Year	Title	Rider
2019	Thundersport 500 Champion	Grant Whitaker
2018	Thundersport 500 Champion	Josh Leaning
2017	Thundersport 500 Champion	Peter Bardell
2016	Thundersport 500 Champion	Joe Barton
2015	Thundersport 500 Champion	Joe Barton
2014	Thundersport 500 Champion	Carl Smalley
2013	Thundersport 500 Champion	Adam Shelton
2012	Thundersport 500 Champion	Adam Clarke
2011	Thundersport 500 Champion	Andy Lawson
2010	Thundersport 500 Champion	Mark Evans
2009	Thundersport 500 Champion	Jonathan Harrison
2008	Superclub Champion	Tom Young
2007	Superclub Champion	Ryan Tyers
2006	Superclub Champion	Alex Gault
2005	Superclub Champion	Rick Coles
2004	Superclub Champion	Jonty Dixon
2003	Superclub Champion	Stephen Thompson
2002	Superclub Champion	William Snook
2001	Superclub Champion	Richard Harrison
2000	Superclub Champion	Chris Firmin
1999	Star of Tomorrow Champion	Dominic Davies
1998	National Champion	Gordon Blackley
1998	Newcomers Champion	James Ellison
1997	National Champion	James Toseland
1997	Newcomers Champion	Chris Sherring

== Gallery ==
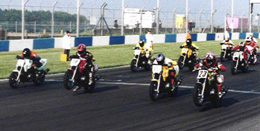

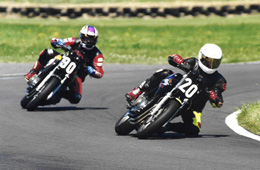

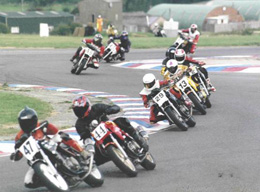
