= 52 Express =

- Manufacturer: Alex Macfadzean
- Class: Streamliner
- Engine: 1,000 hp (750 kW) Rolls-Royce Gem turboshaft
- Transmission: Single-speed; Dual belt drive
- Tires: Front: Solid or pneumatic Rear: 500 mph rated Mickey Thompson pneumatic

52 Express is a turbine powered streamliner motorcycle designed and built by Alex Macfadzean as an all-British land-speed record challenger. It was first displayed to the public in 2014, and as of late 2014 has not been speed tested in public. The intended rider is retired British racer James Toseland.

The 52 Express was shown at Goodwood Festival of Speed in 2013.

== Construction ==
The design team are all British. The machine was primarily designed and created by Alex Macfadzean, who holds the British motorcycle land speed record. Macfadzean had worked as crew member on Don Vesco's wheel-driven land speed record holding (as of 2014) automobile Turbinator in 2001.

The powerplant is a 1,000-horsepower (750 kW) Rolls-Royce Gem turboshaft engine, originally built for helicopter applications. The rear wheels are driven by dual Kevlar belts.

According to Bennetts and others, the rear tire may be constructed of polyurethane by a roller coaster wheel manufacturer.

Students at University of Derby have provided aerodynamic studies of the body and air intakes. They aim to create a design with coefficient of drag less than 0.121. As of June 2016 this task was adopted by Cranfield University.

A second nearly identical streamliner, with a piston engine originally made for the BMW K1100 motorcycle, has been built for testing.
