= Tim Hastings =

British motorcycle racer

- Nationality: British
- Born: 9 October 1992 (age 34); Falkirk, Scotland
- Current team: Team Twister
- Bike number: 50

Timothy Hastings is a former Grand Prix motorcycle racer from Great Britain, who is currently competing in the Scottish Superbike Championship for Team Twister aboard a Kawasaki ZX-6R. He has also competed in the British 125GP Championship, finishing runner-up in the championship in 2008, National Superstock 600 Championship and the British Supersport Championship.

== Career statistics ==
=== By season ===
Season	Class	Motorcycle	Team	Number	Race	Win	Podium	Pole	FLap	Pts	Plcd
2009	125cc	Honda	KRP Bradley Smith Racing	90	1	0	0	0	0	0	NC
Total					**1**	**0**	**0**	**0**	**0**	**0**	

=== Races by year ===
Year	Class	Bike	1	2	3	4	5	6	7	8	9	10	11	12	13	14	15	16	Pos	Points
2009	125cc	Honda	QAT	JPN	SPA	FRA	ITA	CAT	NED	GER	GBR; Ret	CZE	INP	RSM	POR	AUS	MAL	VAL	NC	0

=== British 125cc Championship ===
(key) (Races in bold indicate pole position, races in italics indicate fastest lap)

Year	Bike	1	2	3	4	5	6	7	8	9	10	11	12	Pos	Pts	Ref
2009	Honda	BHI; Ret	OUL; 6	DON; 11	THR; 2	SNE; 3	KNO; 11	MAL; 3	BHGP; 18	CAD; 7	CRO; 3	SIL; 10	OUL	**6th**	**103**	
