= Ivan Sala =

Italian motorcycle racer

- Nationality: Italian
- Born: 20 November 1969 (age 57); Milan, Italy
- Current team: Hotel Luisiana, Banco Lafise, Yamaha Costa Rica
- Bike number: 17
- Website: www.ivansala.com

Ivan Sala (born 20 November 1969) is an Italian former motorcycle racer.

Sala's first race was at Misano racetrack in 1992, where he finished in fourth place. In 2012, he finished 16th in the AMA Superbike Team Edge Performance Suzuki competition at Laguna Seca Raceway.

In December 2004, Sala moved to Costa Rica and began working in the real estate market and selling bikes.

Salas is a 12-time champion in Costa Rica 300cc, 600cc and 1000cc.

2016 Panana champion in superbike 1000cc 2018 champion 1000 cc Costa Rica 2019 champion 1000 cc Costa Rica 2020 champion 600 cc Costa Rica 2021 champion 1000 cc Costa Rica 2022 Second place - 1000 cc Costa Rica 2023 champion 1000 cc Costa Rica 2024 Champion 1000 cc Costa Rica
