= Economic history of China (1949–present) =

The economic history of China describes the changes and developments in China's economy from the founding of the People's Republic of China (PRC) in 1949 to the present day. The speed of China's transformation in this period from one of the poorest countries to one of the world's largest economies is unmatched in history.

Since Mao Zedong's 1949 proclamation of the People's Republic of China, the country has experienced a surprising and turbulent economic development process. It has experienced revolution, socialism, Maoism, and finally the gradual economic reform and fast economic growth that has characterized the post-Maoist period. The period of the Great Leap Forward and the Great Chinese Famine negatively impacted the economy. The chaos of the Cultural Revolution also disrupted the economy. The construction of the Third Front increased China's industrial development and infrastructure in its interior regions. Since the period of Reform and Opening Up began in 1978, China has seen major improvements in average living standards and has experienced relative social stability.

Since the Reform and Opening Up period, China has evolved into a backbone of the world economy. China has been the fastest growing economy in the world since the 1980s, with an average annual growth rate of 10% from 1978 to 2005, based on government statistics. Its GDP reached US$2.286 trillion in 2005. Since the end of the Maoist period in 1978, China has been transitioning from a state dominated planned socialist economy to a mixed economy. This transformation required a complex number of reforms in China's fiscal, financial, enterprise, governance and legal systems and the ability for the government to be able to flexibly respond to the unintended consequences of these changes. This transformation has been accompanied by high levels of industrialization and urbanization, a process that has influenced every aspect of China's society, culture and economy.

China's government continues to have a significant role in economic development, including through various forms of state ownership and collective ownership.

== Economic policies, 1949–1976 ==
When the Chinese Communist Party (CCP) came to power in 1949, its leaders' fundamental long-range goals were to transform China into a modern, powerful, socialist nation. In economic terms these objectives meant industrialization, improvement of living standards, narrowing of income differences, and production of modern military equipment. As the years passed, the leadership continued to subscribe to these goals. But the economic policies formulated to achieve them were dramatically altered on several occasions in response to major changes in the economy, internal politics, and international political and economic developments.

Throughout the Mao era, the CCP attempted to demonetize and de-commodify the Chinese economy through top-down policy interventions, having developed institutions that bring economic life under greater state control. The CCP established "puppet-like micro-management institutions" to regulate market activity and limit spontaneous exchange between the two sectors of the economy. Leaders also attempted to withdraw currency from circulation and "return it to the cage" to combat "spontaneous capitalist tendencies" among rural consumers. However, despite these policies, Chinese citizens continued to engage in market-based transactions in an informal economy that constituted a substantial proportion of economic output throughout the Mao era. For example, some private enterprises continued to exist in south China.

In the centrally planned economy era, infrastructure developed rapidly. This was financed through government revenues, the revenues of state-owned enterprises engaged in infrastructure building, and rural resources mobilized by the people's communes.

China mostly avoided inflation during the Mao era.

=== Recovery from war, 1949–52 ===
In 1949, China's economy was suffering from the debilitating effects of decades of the Chinese Civil War. Many mines and factories had been damaged or destroyed. At the end of the war with Japan in 1945, Soviet troops had dismantled about half the machinery in the major industrial areas of the northeast and shipped it to the Soviet Union. Transportation, communication, and power systems had been destroyed or had deteriorated because of lack of maintenance. Agriculture was disrupted, and food production was some 30 percent below its pre-war peak level. Further, economic ills were compounded by one of the most virulent inflation rates in world history.

As the Nationalists retreated to Taiwan during their defeat in the Chinese Civil War, they stripped China of liquid assets including gold, silver, and the country's dollar reserves. Nationalist forces also attempted to firebomb industrial sites, but workers were able to stop them at many such locations. By the time the Nationalists were defeated, commerce had been destroyed, the national currency rendered valueless, and the economy was based on barter. The economic damage of the civil war was compounded by the United States' embargo against the PRC and the Eastern Bloc countries remained China's only source of foreign economic, material, and technical support. The PRC pursued a policy of rapid industrialization relying primarily on its domestic resources. The Chinese economy recovered quickly from 1949 to 1957.

After the civil war, the CCP established a policy of balancing the budget or running a surplus. Balanced budgets or surpluses had been the norm in Chinese governance until the Qing (after defeat in the First Sino-Japanese War of 1894–1895) and the Republic of China ran yearly budget deficits and accumulated large amounts of debt.

The Common Program approved in late September 1949 by the Chinese People's Political consultative Conference prioritized ownership of the state-owned economy, although it also gave consideration to some private interests. It did not seek to eliminate capitalism as a whole, instead encouraging private enterprises viewed as beneficial to the national economy and sought to implement a mixed economy. At the founding of the PRC, the Central Finance and Economy Commission under the transitional Government Administrative Council was the single central government organ in charge of national economic planning and construction management. It was led by Chen Yun and Bo Yibo. Its major priorities were restoring national economic order, price stabilization, currency stabilization, establishing a management mechanism for the planned economy, and preparing for the First Five-Year Plan.

To bring inflation under control by 1951, the government unified the monetary system, tightened credit, restricted government budgets at all levels and put them under central control, and guaranteed the value of the currency. The CCP's success in overcoming hyperinflation and stabilizing prices became a major source of the new government's legitimacy. Price increases from the 1950s to the 1970s were generally minimal, although the periods of the Great Leap Forward and the Great Chinese Famine were notable exceptions. China ultimately had one of the most stable fiat currencies in modern history during the Mao era.

Commerce was stimulated and partially regulated by the establishment of state trading agencies (commercial departments), which competed with private traders in purchasing goods from producers and selling them to consumers or enterprises. State trading agencies served as a mechanism for re-creating and integrating markets and through this process of re-integration between urban and rural economies helped stabilize the value of money.

The early PRC government established a centralized banking system focused on a few state institutions. Early banking regulations were adopted from the Soviet Union's regulations. The People's Bank of China was the only commercial bank under this centralized system and the only provider of credit, settlement clearance, and teller services. In 1950, the Bank of China became a bureau of the People's Bank of China. Pursuant to regulations issued in 1953, only the Bank of China could handle foreign currency and international transactions.

Another of the CCP's early steps was to nationalize enterprises that the defeated Nationalists had controlled. These were turned into state-owned enterprises (SOEs). By 1952, China's SOEs accounted for more than 40% of industrial production. As the industrial means of production were transferred to the state, conditions for workers improved. The growing number of state workers were entitled to permanent employment, an eight-hour day, medical benefits, subsidized food and housing, as well as an eight-grade wage scale that was consistent across different state owned enterprises.

Under a nationwide land reform movement which had begun before the CCP victory and continued afterwards, titles to about 45 percent of the arable land were redistributed from landlords and more prosperous farmers to the 60 to 70 percent of farm families that previously owned little or no land. The success of early land reform meant that at the founding of the PRC in 1949, China could credibly claim that for the first time since the late Qing period that it had succeeded in feeding one fifth of the world's population with only 7% of the world's cultivable land. Once land reform was completed in an area, farmers were encouraged to cooperate in some phases of production through the formation of small "mutual aid teams" of six or seven households each. Thirty-eight percent of all farm households belonged to mutual aid teams in 1952. By 1952 price stability had been established, commerce had been restored, and industry and agriculture had regained their previous peak levels of production. By 1953, China had rapidly recovered its economy.

=== First Five-Year Plan, 1953–57 ===
Having restored a viable economic base, the leadership under Mao Zedong, Zhou Enlai, and other revolutionary veterans was prepared to embark on an intensive program of industrial growth and socialist transformation. For this purpose the administration adopted the Soviet economic model under the slogan "Learn from the Soviet Union." The Soviet approach to economic development was manifested in the First Five-Year Plan (1953–57), which Soviet planners helped formulate. As in the Soviet economy, priority was placed on heavy industry and capital goods. Large numbers of Soviet engineers, technicians, and scientists assisted in developing and installing new heavy industrial facilities, including many entire plants and pieces of equipment purchased from the Soviet Union. Compared to the Soviet planning method, the Chinese approach had less centralized planning with regard to consumer goods and regional planning authorities had greater authority.

Government control over industry was increased during this period by applying financial pressures and inducements to convince owners of private, modern firms to sell them to the state or convert them into joint public-private enterprises under state control. Through joint-public private enterprises, the government held the majority of ownership but private owners (deemed "national capitalists," i.e., supportive of the government) retained minority ownership and had a management role. These private owners received fixed dividends based on appraised value of the enterprise at the time of its conversion to a joint public-private enterprise.

China nationalized commerce, industry, and handicrafts over the period 1953 to 1956. Its industrial outputs grew by 31% in 1955 and a further 10% in 1956. By 1956, nearly all large-scale commerce and industry had been nationalized and virtually all urban private business ownership had been ended. China had finished its efforts to complete a socialist transformation of the domestic economy. However, certain market activity persisted and remained underground.

Agriculture also underwent extensive organizational changes. In fall 1953, the CCP's Central Committee instituted a state monopoly in purchasing and marketing of grain (and other raw materials). This policy served to break the relationship between wealthy peasants and grain merchants, ending the ability to profit from speculation in grain.

To facilitate the mobilization of agricultural resources, improve the efficiency of farming, and increase government access to agricultural products, the authorities encouraged farmers to organize increasingly large and socialized collective units. This collectivization continued over the period 1955 to 1958. From the loosely structured, tiny mutual aid teams, villages were to advance first to lower-stage, agricultural producers' cooperatives, in which families still received some income on the basis of the amount of land they contributed, and eventually to advanced cooperatives, or collectives. In the advanced producers' cooperatives, income shares were based only on the amount of labor contributed. In addition, each family was allowed to retain a small private plot on which to grow vegetables, fruit, and livestock for its own use. The collectivization process began slowly but accelerated in 1955 and 1956. In 1957 about 93.5 percent of all farm households had joined advanced producers' cooperatives. Although the agriculture sector only received 6.2% of the budget during the first five-year plan, agricultural gross outputs increased by 24.7%.

The industrial working class grew from 6 million to 10 million. Industrial work places organized as danwei (work units) provided subsidized housing, permanent jobs, education, and medical care. In the early 1950s, China established a social security system covering workers at SOEs, collectively owned enterprises, government administrative units (such as Ministries) and operative units (such as public universities and state-owned hospitals).

During the middle of the 1950s, state planning controls by the central government relaxed to allow a somewhat increased role for markets and for greater involvement by province and local level governments. The 8th National Congress of the Chinese Communist Party made these measures public in September 1956, announcing that "minor commodities" could be traded on the market and peasants could develop sideline work like handicrafts or raising poultry.

In June 1956, China introduced a wage reform, which included the national eight-rank wage scaled based on the principle of "from each according to their ability, to each according to their labor."

Throughout the 1950s, a major challenge for the large-scale economic modernization was the relative lack of managerial talent. Promotion of ordinary workers to management roles was intended to address this challenge while also serving the larger political goal of placing the proletariat in control.

=== Great Leap Forward, 1958–61 ===
Imbalances between rural China and urban China existed in the prerevolutionary period and continued into the 1950s. Before the end of the First Five-Year Plan, the growing imbalance between industrial and agricultural growth, dissatisfaction with inefficiency, and lack of flexibility in the decision-making process convinced the nation's leaders – particularly Mao Zedong – that the highly centralized, industry-based Soviet model was not appropriate for China. The income gap between rural and urban Chinese had widened. The situation was one Mao had begun to worry about before 1957, with his 1956 On the Ten Major Relationships identifying the importance of "the relationship between heavy industry on one hand and light industry and agriculture on the other."

The Great Leap Forward's focus on total workforce mobilization resulted in opportunities for women's labor advancement. As women became increasingly needed to work in agriculture and industry, and encouraged by policy to do so, the concept of Iron Women arose. Women did traditionally male work in both fields and factories, including major movements of women into management positions. Women competed for high productivity, and those who distinguished themselves came to be called Iron Women.

The Great Leap Forward also partially socialized reproductive labor though collective housework, childcare, and the collective canteens which included free or partially free food distribution.

In 1958, Mao criticized leftists within the CCP who sought to abolish socialist commodity production and commodity exchange. In doing so, Mao affirmed the theoretical view previously expressed by Joseph Stalin that commodity production should not necessarily be identified with the capitalist mode of production because in socialism the money economy is designed to consolidate and develop socialist production.

In the middle of the Second Five-Year Plan (i.e., in the early 1960s), the economy began to recover from the failures of the Great Leap Forward. After the failures of the Great Leap Forward, Mao presided over a long period of economic growth in which China developed economic infrastructure and eliminated much of the country's worst poverty. China's development accelerated, including with regard to the production of material goods. In the view of historian Maurice Meisner, this created a concern for CCP leadership: while rapid economic development and ideological transformation was necessary to release the productive energy of the masses, it also raised a risk that China could backslide into capitalism.

Although the Third Five Year Plan would have commenced in 1963, the economic turmoil the Great Leap Forward period prompted CCP leadership to delay Plan until 1966. In the interim, a group led by Liu Shaoqi worked to revive the economy through an increased role for markets, greater material incentives for workers, a lower rate of investment, a more moderate pace for developmental goals, and increased funding for consumer industries.

=== Cultural Revolution ===
The Cultural Revolution was set in motion by Mao Zedong in 1966 and called to a halt in 1968, but the atmosphere of radical leftism persisted until Mao's death and the fall of the Gang of Four in 1976. During this period, there were several distinct phases of economic policy.

Until the Cultural Revolution, China had paid dividends to the former capitalist class from the value of property that had been seized in the revolution.

The state's Third Front campaign began in 1965 and continued during the Cultural Revolution. Motivated by fears of invasion by the Soviet Union or the United States, China implemented a major campaign to develop industry and national security facilities in remote areas, along with the necessary infrastructure. The development of the Third Front also had the effect of bringing higher quality consumer goods and cultural goods to China's hinterlands. The rapprochement between the United States and China reduced the motivations for the Third Front construction, and projects were ultimately wound down with many privatized during China's Reform and Opening Up. Through the development of infrastructure, industry, and specialized talent in these remote regions, the Third Front construction laid a foundation for continued economic development in China's western regions even after the end of the initiative.

The People's Bank of China suspended its commercial banking service during the Cultural Revolution. In 1969, the State Council approved the consolidation of People's Bank of China headquarters as a bureau within the Ministry of Finance, and local branches were merged into local government finance departments. This effective demotion of the PBoC lasted for a decade.

After Nixon's China trip in 1972, investment to the Third Front region gradually declined. Rapprochement between the United States and China decreased the fear of invasion which motivated the Third Front construction. In August 1972, the Planning Commission recommended that the First and Second Fronts no longer view supporting the Third Front as their "primary task," instead downgrading the Third Front assistance to an "important task." The Planning Commission also stated concerns about the amount of Third Front funding leading to neglect of heavy industry elsewhere, as well as insufficient investment in agriculture. After a CCP conference in May 1973 resolved to re-direct state investment efforts from the Third Front to the northeast and the coastal regions, the Third Front was no longer the country's most critical economic objective. Agriculture and light industry became more important priorities. When Reform and Opening Up began in 1978, China started a process of winding down Third Front projects with a "shut down, cease, merge, transform, and move" strategy.

==== Gang of Four, 1974–76 ====
Mao's last years included a period of general economic disarray as a wave of strikes, factory slowdowns, and worker absenteeism arose in the majority of major industrial centers, accompanied by an increase in crime, including looting of state granaries. The rationing system expanded to cover more than 80 percent of staple items and consumer goods. However, by 1975 China's economy was performing well according to most conventional economic measures. Although the economy was not on the verge of collapse as some post-Mao historical narratives portray, it nonetheless faced pervasive economic difficulties caused by political instability and the consequences of China's developmentalist model, which prioritized growth in industrial and military capacity rather than consumption. SOE-led investment in heavy industry contributed to economic slowdown in the early 1970s. However, it also established an education pool of workers, low indebtedness, and state capital that served as a foundation for the success of the subsequent reforms.

== Reform and opening up, beginning in 1978 ==
"What is socialism and what is Marxism? We were not quite clear about this in the past. Marxism attaches utmost importance to developing the productive forces.

We have said that socialism is the primary stage of communism and that at the advanced stage the principle of from each, according to his ability, to each, according to his needs, will be applied. This calls for highly developed productive forces and an overwhelming abundance of material wealth.

Therefore, the fundamental task for the socialist stage is to develop the productive forces. The superiority of the socialist system is demonstrated, in the final analysis, by faster and greater development of those forces than under the capitalist system.

As they develop, the people's material and cultural life will constantly improve. One of our shortcomings after the founding of the People's Republic was that we didn't pay enough attention to developing the productive forces. Socialism means eliminating poverty. Pauperism is not socialism, still less communism."

— Chinese paramount leader Deng Xiaoping on June 30, 1984

Despite political upheavals during the Mao era, China's GNP grew an average of 6.2% annually over the period 1952–1978. Industrialization during the Mao era resulted in the significant accumulation of both physical and human capital, which laid the foundation for China's successful reforms. The World Bank's first report on China assessed the Mao era positively, citing rapid growth and industrialization as well as the "virtual elimination of the worst aspects of poverty," although it also identified room for improvement.

Chinese reformers were more critical, however. For example, Hu Qiaomu's July 1978 report to the State Council, "Act in Accordance with Economic Laws," described the situation of the peasants as grave and estimated that grain output had merely kept pace with population growth.

At the milestone 3rd plenary session of the 11th Central Committee of the Chinese Communist Party which opened on December 22, 1978, the party leaders decided to undertake a program of gradual but fundamental reform of the economic system. The traditional historical analysis views December 1978 as the beginning of China's reform and opening up, although some reforms efforts had already begun prior to Mao's death in 1976. Improved relationships with the capitalist countries, which began during the later Mao period and continued during Deng's leadership, along with the policymakers' perceptions of economic stagnation, prompted China to move further from the then-conventional approach to socialist industrialization.

Academic Kenneth Lieberthal writes, "In the 1980s, the difference was that Deng understood the inadequacies of previous policies and encouraged more significant change as required. The results raised difficult political issues and challenged deeply entrenched interests. Among Deng's greatest accomplishments was his ability in the late 1970s and much of the 1980s to sustain, on balance, pro-reform momentum in a badly divided political system".

The purpose of the reform program was not to abandon communism but to make it work better by substantially increasing the role of market mechanisms in the system and by reducing—not eliminating—government planning and direct control. In the CCP's view, economic planning would be a mechanism for steering the market. Therefore, the CCP did not perceive its reforms as the foundation for a liberal market economy.

Generally, reforms in this period started with local experiments that were adopted and expanded elsewhere once their success had been demonstrated. Officials generally faced few penalties for experimenting and failing and those who developed successful programs received nation-wide praise and recognition.

The government resumed dividend payments to Chinese capitalists whose property had been seized after the revolution (the practice had been suspended as a result of a campaign during the Cultural Revolution), including with interest.

Beginning in 1978 and running through 2007, China's economy grew by 10% annually and per capita income increased tenfold.

=== Period of readjustment, 1979–81 ===
The first few years of the reform program were designated the "period of readjustment," during which key imbalances in the economy were to be corrected and a foundation was to be laid for a well-planned modernization drive. The schedule of Hua Guofeng's ten-year plan was discarded, although many of its elements were retained.

The major goals of the readjustment process were to expand exports rapidly; overcome key deficiencies in transportation, communications, coal, iron, steel, building materials, and electric power; and redress the imbalance between light and heavy industry by increasing the growth rate of light industry and reducing investment in heavy industry. Agricultural production was stimulated in 1979 by an increase of over 22 percent in the procurement prices paid for farm products.

Economist Thomas Rawski summarized China's economic development from 1957 to 1979, writing that "a nation that until 1957 could not manufacture tractors, power plants, or wristwatches now produces computers, earth satellites, oral contraceptives, and nuclear weapons. The technical skills required for industrial development are no longer confined within a few isolated urban enclaves."

The central policies of the reform program were introduced experimentally during the readjustment period. The most successful reform policy, the household responsibility system in agriculture, began development in 1979 as a way for poor rural units in mountainous or arid areas to increase their incomes. This system, which came to replace collective farming, maintained public ownership of land and some of the means of production, but made production the responsibility of households. Households still had to contribute to state quotas but could make their own decisions about what to plant on contracted land and could sell via a multi-tier price system that included the lowest price for payment to the state up until the quota, a higher rate for above-quota sales to the state, and market price for crops allowed to be sold at fairs. This multi-tier price system also resulted in price stabilization effects that encouraged production while protecting households from a decrease in market prices caused by the production boom. By 1983, the responsibility system was adopted by numerous farm units in all sorts of areas.

Agricultural production was also stimulated by official encouragement to establish free farmers' markets in urban areas, as well as in the countryside, and by allowing some families to operate as "specialized households," devoting their efforts to producing a scarce commodity or service on a profit-making basis.

In July 1979, China adopted its first Law on Joint Venture Using Chinese and Foreign Investment. The Joint Venture Law encouraged foreign direct investment, and as researcher Zongyuan Zoe Liu writes, it was a "near-complete reversal of the CPC's traditional skepticism toward foreign investment grounded in ideological and historical reasons." The Joint Venture Law was effective in helping to attract and absorb foreign technology and capital from advanced countries like the United States, facilitated China's exports to such countries, and thereby contributed to China's subsequent rapid economic growth.

Wage reform was the initial phase of China's labor reform. It added bonus pay to increase workers' material incentives and in 1979-1980 introduced the piece-wage system. Management positions modeled after western conventions were established in state enterprises with additional pay commensurate to rank, thereby increasing internal wage disparities. Management officials also were given the authority to pay workers (instead of wage funds being distributed by the state). Distribution of wages by management instead of the state abolished China's eight-grade wage scale, which had ensured that workers of the same grade received the same wages in all state enterprises.

The Resolution on Certain Questions in the History of Our Party since the Founding of the People's Republic of China stated that China would have public ownership and planning as the "foundation" of its economy with markets having a "supplementary" function.

The 1981 Several Decisions on Finding New Ways, Developing the Economy and Solving the Problem of Unemployment in the Cities described individually-owned businesses as "a necessary supplement to socialist state-owned businesses". This idea was written into China's 1982 constitution.

=== Reform and opening, beginning in 1982 ===
The period of readjustment produced promising results, increasing incomes substantially; raising the availability of food, housing, and other consumer goods; and generating strong rates of growth in all sectors except heavy industry, which was intentionally restrained. On the strength of these initial successes, the reform program was broadened, and the leadership under Deng Xiaoping frequently remarked that China's basic policy was "reform and opening," that is, reform of the economic system and opening to foreign trade.

In 1982, Chen Yun described the influential metaphor of the "birdcage economy" when he stated:

Liberalizing the economy should be done under the guidance of a plan, not independent of it. This is like the relationship between a bird and a cage. A bird cannot be held tightly in your hand, otherwise it will die. It must be allowed to fly, but only within the cage. Without a cage, the bird will fly away. If we say that the bird represents the liberalization of the economy, then the cage represents our national development plan. Of course, the size of the 'cage' should be suitable. It can be whatever size it needs to be. Economic activities are not necessarily limited to one province or one region. Under the guidance of the plan, economic activities can cross provinces and regions, even cross continents and countries. Additionally, the 'cage' can be frequently adjusted. For example, the adjustments we make to our Five Year Plans. However, no matter what, there must always be a cage.

In October 1984, the CCP adopted its Decision on the Reform of the Economic System, marking a major shift in the thinking of Chinese policymakers with regard to market mechanisms. The Decision acknowledged that a planned economy was not the only way to develop socialism and that prior policies restricting the commodity economy had hindered socialist development. After the Decision, reform focused on building a socialist planned commodity economy with Chinese characteristics.

In industry the complexity and interrelation of production activities prevented a single, simple policy from bringing about the kind of dramatic improvement that the responsibility system achieved in agriculture. Nonetheless, a cluster of policies based on greater flexibility, autonomy, and market involvement significantly improved the opportunities available to most enterprises, generated high rates of growth, and increased efficiency. Enterprise managers gradually gained greater control over their units, including the right to hire and fire, although the process required endless struggles with bureaucrats and CCP cadres. The practice of remitting taxes on profits and retaining the balance became universal by 1985, increasing the incentive for enterprises to maximize profits and substantially adding to their autonomy. A change of potentially equal importance was a shift in the source of investment funds from government budget allocations, which carried no interest and did not have to be repaid, to interest-bearing bank loans. As of 1987 the interest rate charged on such loans was still too low to serve as a check on unproductive investments, but the mechanism was in place.

The role of foreign trade under the economic reforms increased far beyond its importance in any previous period. Before the reform period, the combined value of imports and exports had seldom exceeded 10 percent of national income. In 1969 it was 15 percent, in 1984 it was 21 percent, and in 1986 it reached 35 percent. Unlike earlier periods, when China was committed to trying to achieve self-sufficiency, under Deng Xiaoping foreign trade was regarded as an important source of investment funds and modern technology. As a result, restrictions on trade were loosened further in the mid-1960s, and foreign investment was legalized. The most common foreign investments were joint ventures between foreign firms and Chinese units. Sole ownership by foreign investors also became legal, but the feasibility of such undertakings remained questionable.

Beginning in May 1980, China established special economic zones in Shenzhen, Zhuhai, Shantou and Xiamen, in Fujian Province. Their success led to the designation of fourteen coastal cities as SEZs in 1984, and then the development of Pudong, a primarily agricultural are in Shanghai. Most of China's special economic zones are located in former treaty ports and therefore have symbolic significance in demonstrating a "reversal of fortunes" in China's dealings with foreigners since the century of humiliation. Researcher Zongyuan Zoe Liu writes that "[t]he success of these cities as 'red' treaty ports represented another step in China's overall reform and opening-up plan while legitimizing the leadership of the CPC over the Chinese state and people."

Deng and other reformist policy-makers legalized small-scale private businesses. Based on Karl Marx's observation that a private owner having more than eight employees led to exploitation, getihu of no greater than that size were permitted. Typical getihu were roadside stalls or small shops which focused on consumer purchases. Allowing private individuals to establish small businesses alleviated employment pressures that had developed following the return of approximately 6.5 million sent-down youths who returned from rural to urban areas during 1978 and 1979.

During the 1980s, low labor costs made China one of the major producers of inexpensive manufactured goods.

By 1984, agricultural production had boomed following the institution of the household responsibility system, which replaced collective farming. Then-Premier Zhao Ziyang wrote in his memoirs that in the years following the institution of household responsibility system, “the energy that was unleashed … was magical, beyond what anyone could have imagined. A problem thought to be unsolvable had worked itself out in just a few years time … [B]y 1984, farmers actually had more grain than they could sell. The state grain storehouses were stacked full from the annual procurement program.” As the government raised prices for grain and cotton and stimulated the growth of township and village enterprises, household income surged and poverty decreased from 1980 to 1985. Life improved for millions of people in rural China. However, the agricultural policies responsible for the boom also increased inequalities. Regions with fertile soil, transportation hubs, or big cities were far more able to take advantage of market opportunities.

A significant economic debate during this period concerned the approach to price liberalization and whether China should adopt an approach consistent with shock therapy—sudden price liberalization—or a more gradual approach. But in 1986, the latter approach won out. "Confronted with the diverse, authoritative warnings about the unforeseeable risks of imposing the shock of price reform and the uncertainty about its benefits" Premier Zhao Ziyang and the leadership ultimately rejected shock price reform. Zhao had accepted the argument that the basic concern in economic reform was energizing enterprises. By late summer, what started under the rubric of "coordinated comprehensive package reform" had been diluted to an adjustment in the price of steel (although its price was both important had carried symbolic weight) as well as partial tax and financial reform.

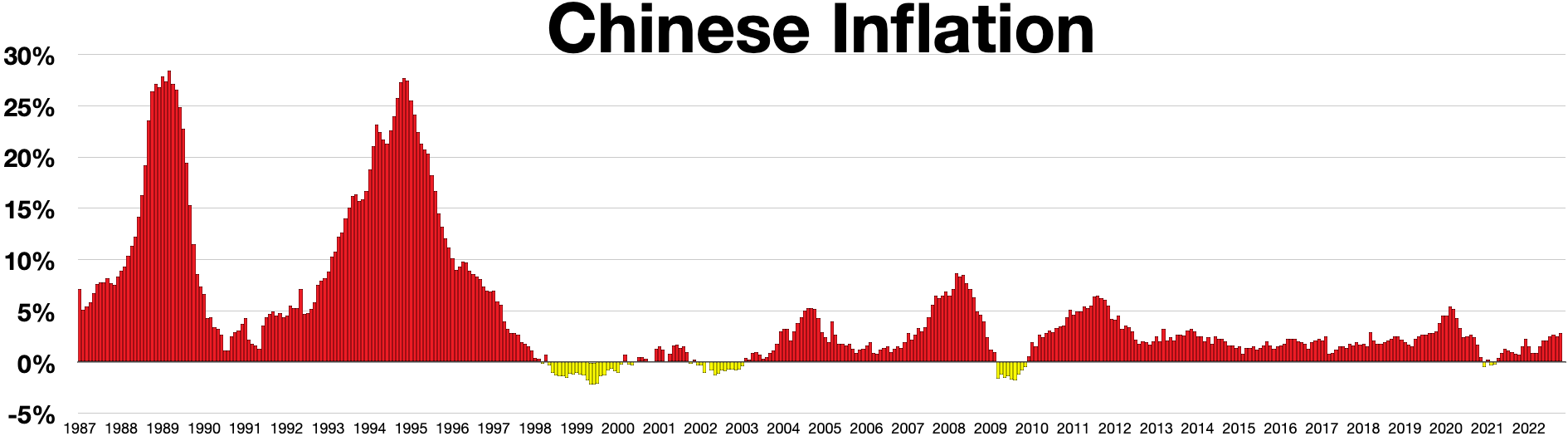
Chinese inflation 1987 - 2022

From the 1980s to 1994, China had a revenue-sharing fiscal contracting system in which local governments transferred a part of their tax revenues to the next highest level of government of retained the rest.

In 1981, China joined the International Monetary Fund and the World Bank. It resumed status as a member of the General Agreement on Tariffs and Trade (GATT) in 1987.

In 1986, the Contract Labor Law was passed, increasing management's power. Newly hired workers had to sign year-to-year contracts, with the goal of the policy being to reduce and eventually eliminate permanent employment for state employees.

Although the reform program achieved impressive successes, it also gave rise to several serious problems. One problem was the challenge to party authority presented by the principles of free-market activity and professional managerial autonomy. Another difficulty was a wave of crime, corruption, and—in the minds of many older people—moral deterioration caused by the looser economic and political climate. The most fundamental tensions were those created by the widening income disparities between the people who were "getting rich" and those who were not and by the pervasive threat of inflation. These concerns played a role in the political struggle that culminated in party general secretary Hu Yaobang's forced resignation in 1987. Following Hu's resignation, the leadership engaged in an intense debate over the future course of the reforms and how to balance the need for efficiency and market incentives with the need for government guidance and control. The commitment to further reform was affirmed, but its pace, and the emphasis to be placed on macroeconomic and micro-economic levers, remained objects of caution.

Through 1987 and into early 1988, Zhao's reform agenda focused on combining enterprise contracting with coastal development efforts. In summer 1988, radical price reform again became on the agenda. It provoked a dramatic reaction: inflation spiraled for the first time since the 1940s, and the announced push for price reforms precipitated panic buying, bank runs, and protests, including the 1989 Tiananmen Square protests, in opposition to the market reforms. By fall 1988, price liberalization plans were halted and leadership instead focused on price reform, austerity, and retrenchment.

Also in 1988, the Enterprise Law was passed. It gave enterprises the authority to make major production decisions (including dismissing workers). Following the law's passage, enterprises were leased from the state to management and became distinct legal entities. Workers in these formerly state-run enterprises lost the protections of being state employees. Corporate structures such as partnerships and limited liability companies became permitted. The CCP began describing private enterprises as a "supplement to the socialist publicly owned economy," a characterization that raised their status.

== 1990–2000 ==
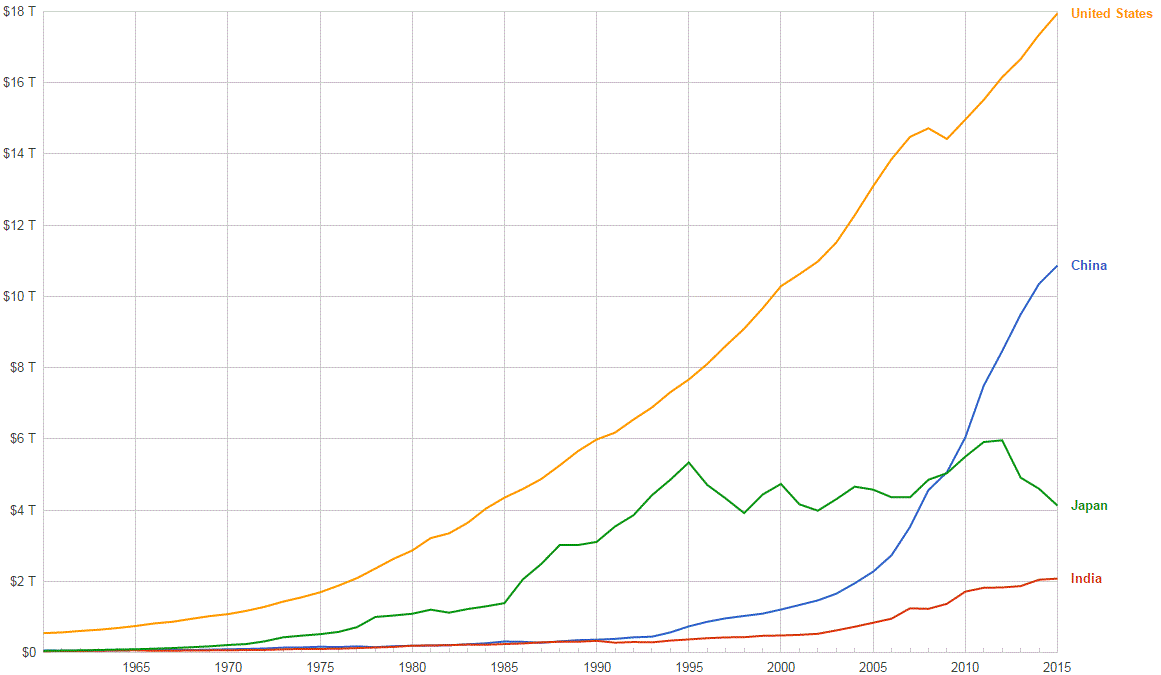
China's nominal GDP trend from 1952 to 2015

China's economy saw continuous real GDP growth of at least 5% since 1991. During a Chinese New Year in early 1992, China's paramount leader Deng Xiaoping made a Southern Tour of China designed to give new impetus to and reinvigorate the process of reform and opening up. During the Southern Tour, Deng stated his view that both government planning and use of the market are economic means which can be compatible with socialism.

In the early 1990s, economic challenges increased in rural China. Grain farming became unprofitable due to falling prices for staple crops relative to the cost of chemical fertilizers, water, electricity, and other necessary services.

Private business ownership gained full legal status in 1992.

While market reforms prior to 1993 focused generally on reform within the larger context of the planned economy, after 1993 Jiang Zemin and Zhu Rongji moved more aggressively to create a modern market economy. In 1993, the CCP issued its "Decision on Issues Related to the Establishment of a Socialist Market Economy System." The 1993 Decision overhauled the organization of China's economic planning apparatus. State planning was not abolished, but instead reframed as one of three key mechanisms of macro-economic control, along with fiscal policy and monetary policy. Chinese administrators were instructed to plan for markets and to absorb major market trends (both domestically and internationally) into multi-year government programs.

In 1993, the National People's Congress adopted the Corporation Law. It provided that in state-owned enterprises, the state is no more than an investor and controller of stock and assets. Pursuant to the Corporation Law, private and foreign investment in such enterprises must be below 49%. The law also permitted state firms to declare bankruptcy in the event of business failure.

China's 1994 fiscal reform resulted in major economic developments. The reform re-centralized tax revenues. It did not adjust expenditure requirements for local governments, however. As a result, local governments experienced shortfalls as revenue decreased but expenditure obligations continued. To address these budget pressures, the central government allowed lower levels to retain revenue from leasing land. These revenues had previously been required to be paid to the central government. This change led to the development of land financing, in which governments leased land to developers and business for a land-leasing fee (in China, land is in principle all state-owned). Local governments then adapted land financing for public borrowing, establishing investment vehicles which could borrow from state banks to finance large-scale infrastructure projects, using land revenue as their collateral. Land financing became an especially important mechanism for financing transportation projects in interior regions, which in turn improved their ability to attract investment and development.

The 1994 reform also impacted patterns of urbanization and domestic internal migration. Under the pre-1994 system of fiscal contracting, township and village enterprises had been an important mechanism of industrialization and most peasants who sought a factory job chose to stay in their hometowns and work at Township and Village Enterprises (TVEs). TVEs began to decline after the 1994 reform and this resulted in major increases in workers migrating to urban areas.

In 1994, China established its major policy banks, the China Development Bank (which focuses on major infrastructure and other projects that improve people's quality of life), the Export-Import Bank of China (which supports China's exports and imports), and the Agricultural Development Bank of China (focused on rural infrastructure).

In 1996, the Chinese economy continued to grow at a rapid pace, at about 9.5%, accompanied by low inflation. The economy slowed for the next three years, influenced in part by the 1997 Asian financial crisis, with official growth of 8.9% in 1997, 7.8% in 1998 and 7.1% for 1999. From 1995 to 1999, inflation dropped sharply, reflecting tighter monetary policies and stronger measures to control food prices. The year 2000 showed a modest reversal of this trend. Gross domestic product in 2000 grew officially at 8.0% that year, and had quadrupled since 1978. In 1999, with its 1.25 billion people but a GDP of just $3,800 per capita (PPP), China became the second largest economy in the world after the US when measuring in PPP.

In 1997, the CCP issued a policy upgrading the party's view of the private economy from a "supplement to the state-owned economy" to an important component of the socialist market economy."

The 1997 Asian financial crisis affected China at the margin, mainly through decreased foreign direct investment and a sharp drop in the growth of its exports. China's nonconvertible capital account and its foreign exchange controls were decisive in limiting the impacts of the crisis. China declined to devalue its own currency, a decision which was well-regarded by the international community. China also contributed $4 billion to neighboring countries via a combination of bilateral bailouts and contributing to IMF bailout packages.

The crisis helped solidify Chinese policymakers' views that China should not move towards a liberal market economy, and that its reform and opening up should focus on tightening financial regulations and resisting foreign pressures to open the country's financial markets prematurely. Lessons learned by policymakers also became an important factor in China's evolving approach to managing state-owned assets, particularly its foreign exchange reserves, and its creation of sovereign funds beginning with Central Huijin in 2003. China tightened its controls over foreign exchange and capital flows, including making violations of the foreign exchange regulations punishable as crimes.

Despite China's impressive economic development during the past two decades, reforming the state sector and modernizing the banking system remained major hurdles. Over half of China's state-owned enterprises were inefficient and reporting losses. However, SOEs which operated at a loss sometimes did so for complex reasons, including as a result of policies which deliberately imposed higher income tax and VAT on SOEs than on foreign joint and privates companies.

During the 15th National Congress of the Chinese Communist Party that met in September 1997, Jiang announced plans to sell, merge, or close the vast majority of SOEs in his call for increased "non-public ownership" (feigongyou or privatization in euphemistic terms). The 9th National People's Congress endorsed the plans at its March 1998 session. In 2000, China claimed success in its three-year effort to make the majority of large SOEs profitable. By that year, the state sector accounted for 47% of industrial assets, approximately 50% of government output, and accounted for one-third of urban employment.

In March 2000, Jiang announced the policy of Going Out at the Third Session of the 9th National People's Congress. In Jiang's view, continuing development in China required active participation in global economic competition and that the state should support Chinese enterprises in gradual foreign investment and multi-national operations.

The CCP addressed the importance of the private sector for its membership via the Three Represents.

Particularly since 2000, the product complexity of China's exports have increased. This has been driven both by increasing technical capabilities and infrastructure as well as factors like China's business and legal environment.

== 2001–2012 ==
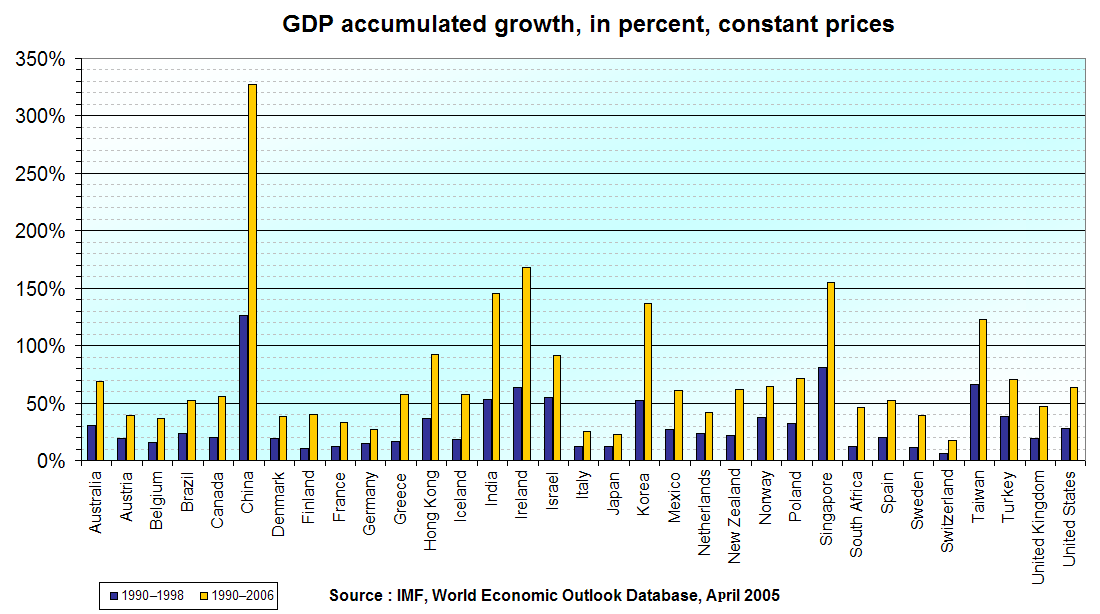
GDP increase, 1990–98 and 1990–2006, in major countries

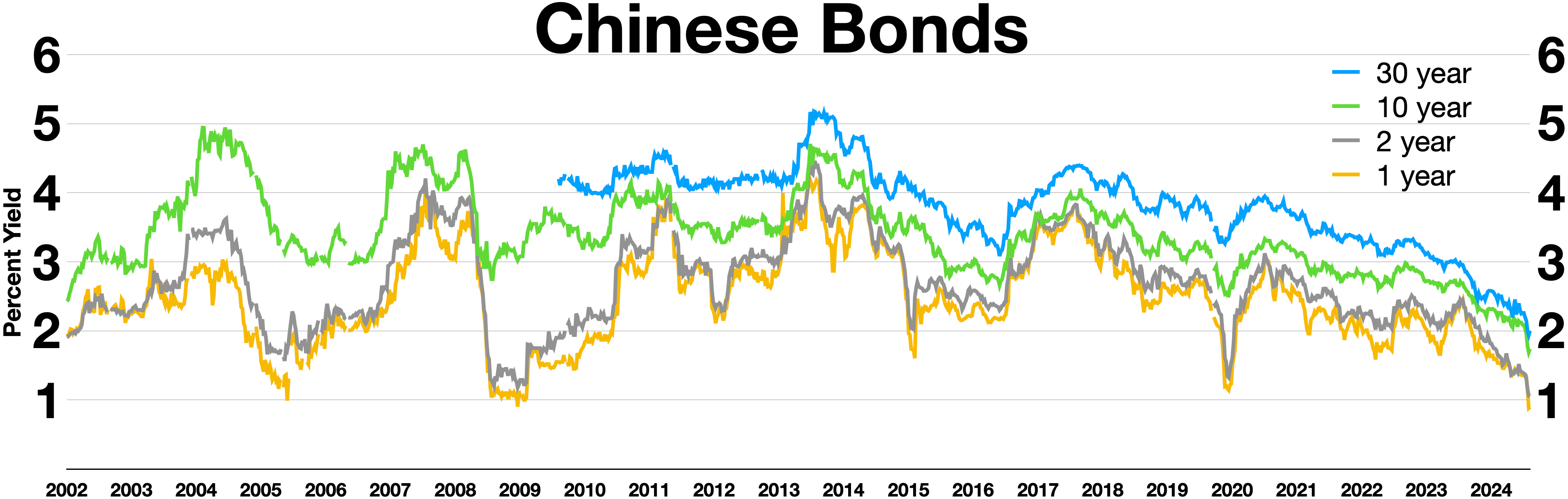
China bond yields 30 year bond 10 year bond 2 year bond 1 year bond

After its entry into the World Trade Organization (WTO) in December 2001, China began pursuing export-led growth and became a key link in global supply chains. Chinese businesses were encouraged to trade directly with foreign companies (instead of working through SOEs as previously). with the exception of certain state monopoly sectors deemed critical to national security. China's industrious and cheap labor also proved attractive to foreign investments. China accumulated large trade surpluses and foreign currency reserves, which greatly increased government resources.

During the 2000s, China's coastal areas continued to outpace its interior in economic development. As regional disparities widened however, coastal areas became a major source of investment for inland areas.Manufacturing that was lower on the value chain trended towards moving inland. This trend was termed "industrial transfer." Developing Chinese policymakers reacted by further encouraging industrial transfer.

By 2002, the profits of industrial state-owned enterprises had grown by 163.6%.

In 2003, China became a financial creditor nation.

Since the early 2000s, China's clean energy sector has rapidly developed. This growth has enabled renewable energy to have an important role in China's international cooperation, including South-South cooperation in which China is a major source of clean energy technology transfer to other developing countries.

Following the CCP's Third Plenum, held in October 2003, Chinese legislators unveiled several proposed amendments to the state constitution. One of the most significant was a proposal to provide protection for private property rights. Legislators also indicated there would be a new emphasis on certain aspects of overall government economic policy, including efforts to reduce unemployment (now in the 8–10% range in urban areas), to re-balance income distribution between urban and rural regions, and to maintain economic growth while protecting the environment and improving social equity. The National People's Congress approved the amendments when it met in March 2004.

In 2004, China's constitution was amended to state that China "encourages, supports, and guides the development" of the private sector "in accordance with law, exercises supervision and control." The constitutional revisions stated that "citizens' lawful private property is inviolable," which was the first time in PRC history that private property rights received constitutional guarantees. This revision resulted in opposition from some intellectuals and others who contended that China was "mimicking Western capitalism." Final approval of the Property Law was delayed several years as a result.

The Fifth Plenum in October 2005 approved the 11th Five-Year Economic Program (2006–2010) aimed at building a socialist harmonious society through more balanced wealth distribution and improved education, medical care, and social security. In March 2006, the National People's Congress approved the 11th Five-Year Program. The plan called for a relatively conservative 45% increase in GDP and a 20% reduction in energy intensity (energy consumption per unit of GDP) by 2010.

In the early 2000s, the government began to finance construction of cross-regional transportation to improve accessibility to, and develop of, China's interior regions. In March 2004, Premier Wen Jiabao announced The Rise of the Central Regions during his delivery of the Annual Report of the State Council. This initiative was added to the Politburo's agenda in 2006.

In the mid-2000s, the strategy of economic rebalancing became a major principle of Chinese economic policy. This strategy seeks to transition China from an export-driven economy to one led by Chinese innovation and domestic consumption. It was later incorporated into China's Twelfth Five-Year Plan (2011–2015) as the Plan's major objective.

On January 14, 2009, as confirmed by the World Bank the NBS published the revised figures for 2007 financial year in which growth happened at 13 percent instead of 11.9 percent (provisional figures). China's gross domestic product stood at US$3.4 trillion while Germany's GDP was US$3.3 trillion for 2007. This made China the world's third largest economy by gross domestic product. Based on these figures, in 2007 China recorded its fastest growth since 1994 when the GDP grew by 13.1 percent.

In response to the 2008 financial crisis, China launched its Economic Stimulus Plan. China increased its standing as a responsible global actor during the crisis. China's response both helped stabilize the global economy and also provided an opportunity for China to retool its own infrastructure. Although China was significantly affected by the crisis due to the export oriented nature of the economy which depends heavily upon international trade, by nearly all accounts its stimulus was hugely successful and an important contributor to global economic recovery. Continued economic growth during the crisis increased China's confidence in its model of development and convinced elites that the global balance of power was shifting. The crisis led Chinese policymakers increasingly to question reliance on U.S.-led global markets and the U.S.'s role in international leadership. Viewed from the Chinese perspective, the financial crisis demonstrated that market forces were too unstable not to be managed by the state.

State ownership of the economy, which had been increasing since Hu Jintao's administration began in 2003, increased further after the 2008 financial crisis.

In 2010, China became the largest shipbuilder in the world.

== From 2012 ==
China became the world's second largest economy in 2012. In 2013, it became a middle-income country.

Xi Jinping has set three overarching goals for China's economy. First, to increase China's capacity for innovation so that it will be able to more actively shape global economic rules. Second, to enhance order and security in China's domestic market. Third, creating common prosperity and increasing wealth distribution to the poor.

In 2013, Xi introduced targeted poverty alleviation, which included policies like direct cash transfers, improving housing through relocation and repair funds, skills development, healthcare, job assistance, and others.

During the tenure of Xi Jinping, the use of government guidance funds has increased. Local governments' responses to 2014 changes in the Budget Law drove growth of government guidance funds, as local governments increasingly used government guidance funds to develop business after the 2014 changes limited the amount of budget subsidies they could provide to firms. Notable government guidance funds established during this period include the National Integrated Circuit Industry Investment Fund.

During the Xi Jinping era, the Chinese government continues to use SOEs to serve non-market objectives and CCP control of SOEs has increased while taking some limited steps towards market liberalization, such as increasing mixed ownership of SOEs. Although China has promoted its national champion companies since the Jiang Zemin administration, it has done so particularly strongly since 2017, especially in the technology sector.

In 2015, China articulated its New Development Concept. The New Development Concept holds that after 45 years of rapid growth, China's economy is very large but has distortions and inequalities that create social division and domestic economic risks. Accordingly, the new development concept states that China will deprioritize rapid growth and seek sustainable growth and common prosperity.

Since 2015, the CCP has issued several industrial plans designed to emphasize high-tech innovation and digital development. These industrial plans include Made in China 2025, the "Action Outline for Promoting the Development of Big Data", and the "Three-Year Action Plan to Promote the Development of a New Generation of Artificial Intelligence Industry". China's Thirteenth and Fourteenth Five-Year Plans have also emphasized high-tech and innovative development.

During the Xi Jinping administration, China has emphasized an economic strategy of dual circulation. First, it seeks to rely more on China's domestic consumers. Second, it seeks to innovate more domestically developed technology and thereby reduce China's reliance on western technology.

China met the first of its Two Centenaries goals, becoming an upper-middle income country and eliminating absolute poverty according to the World Bank criteria in 2020.

By 2020, China became the largest trading partner of more than 120 countries. At the end of that year, China signed major free trade agreements with the European Union as well as fifteen different Asia-Pacific countries. As of at least 2023, China is the world's largest exporter, a status it has maintained continuously since 2010.

China's was the only major world economy to experience GDP growth in 2020, when its GDP increased by 2.3%. In 2021, China's GDP growth reached 8.1% (its highest in a decade) and its trade surplus reached an all-time high $687.5 billion.

The China–United States trade war begun under US president Donald Trump resulted in increased economic ties between China and the European Union, largely resulting from resulting shifts in commodity flows.

== See also ==
- Reform and opening up
- Economy of China
- Globalization in China
- Historical GDP of China
- History of banking in China
- History of monetary policy in China
- History of agriculture in China
- Regional Policy in China
- Grasping the large, letting go of the small
- Trade policy of China
