= Energy elasticity =

Term used to refer to energy intensity of GDP

Energy elasticity is a term used with reference to the energy intensity of Gross Domestic Product. It is "the percentage change in energy consumption to achieve one per cent change in national GDP".

This term has been used when describing sustainable growth in the developing world, while being aware of the need to maintain the security of energy supply and constrain the emission of additional greenhouse gases. Energy elasticity is a top-line measure, as the commercial energy sources used by the country in question are normally further itemised as fossil, renewable, etc.

For example, India's national Integrated Energy Policy of 2005 noted current elasticity at 0.80, while planning for 7-8% GDP growth. It expected to be able to reduce this to 0.75 from 2011 and to 0.67 from 2021-22. By 2007, India's Ambassador was able to inform the United Nations Security Council that its GDP was growing by 8%, with only 3.7% growth in its total primary energy consumption, suggesting it had effectively de-linked energy consumption from economic growth.

China has shown the opposite relationship, as, after 2000, it has consumed proportionately more energy to achieve its high double-digit growth rate. Although there are problems with the quality of the estimates of both GDP and energy consumption, by 2003-4 observers placed Chinese energy elasticity at approximately 1.5. For every one percent increase in GDP, energy demand grew by 1.5 percent. Much of this extra demand has been sourced internationally from fossil fuels, such as coal and petroleum.
