= China and the International Monetary Fund =

In 1945, China cofounded the International Monetary Fund (IMF) with 34 other nations. China was initially represented by the Republic of China. In April 1980, representation transferred to the People's Republic of China. The Chinese-IMF relationship mainly operates around affairs associated with IMF governance and the IMF Special Drawing Rights (SDR).

According to one assessment, China acted largely as a "rule-taker" during its first two decades in the IMF, but has over time become a "rule-shaker". Over time, China has established alternative institutions to the IMF whereby it pushes for changes within the IMF while also pursuing alternative institutions to the IMF.

== China and IMF governance ==
China has been trying to expand its political and decision-making power within the IMF. The IMF's voting system weights each country's vote based on the amount of that country's monetary contribution to the Fund. China has been trying to raise its quota. In May 1980, the Chinese government appealed to adjust its IMF quota. With approval from the IMF board, the quota of China was increased from 1.2 billion SDRs to 1.8 billion SDRs. China also obtained a single-country seat on the IMF executive board, which expanded the number of IMF directors to 22 members. As of 2017 the quota of China in the IMF was 30.5 billion SDRs, giving it 6.09% of the total vote.

To further rebalance power in the IMF, China appealed for changes that would transfer voting power to developing economies. In 2010, the Chinese executive director of the Fund, Zhou Xiaochuan, addressed the board and asserted that giving more power to the emerging economies was critical for the group's legitimacy, accountability and long-term health.

China cooperated with other developing countries to advance its rebalancing project. China cooperated with the BRICS, a coalition of the nations of Brazil, Russia, India, China and South Africa. With a larger combined voting share and voice, the BRICS has been more effective at renegotiating IMF governance.

== China and Article IV Obligations ==
China as a current member of the IMF, is bounded by the Articles of Agreement of the International Monetary Fund. However, whether China has fulfilled its obligations defined in Article IV of the International Monetary Fund with its exchange policies and arrangements remains debated. One common accusation is that Beijing manipulates the value of its currency, making the Renminbi undervalued, to gain unfair advantages in international trade. China denies such accusations and stresses its full conformity with the Article of the IMF. Some also find it challenging to prove Beijing policies' misalignment against the Article since intent has to be demonstrated as part of the requirement.

=== Relevance to the IMF ===
While some scholars also analyze the topic under the framework of the WTO and the GATT, it is commonly accepted that the IMF possesses the authority to determine foreign exchange matters. Article XV of the GATT affirmed:

"In all cases in which the CONTRACTING PARTIES are called upon to consider or deal with problems concerning monetary reserves, balances of payments or foreign exchange arrangements, they shall consult fully with the International Monetary Fund. In such consultations, the CONTRACTING PARTIES shall accept the determination of the Fund as to whether action by a contracting party in exchange matters is in accordance with the Articles of Agreement of the International Monetary Fund, or with the terms of a special exchange agreement between that contracting party and the CONTRACTING PARTIES."

The Agreement Between the International Monetary Fund and the World Trade Organization also states that:

"The Fund shall inform in writing the relevant WTO body (including dispute settlement panels) considering exchange measures within the Fund's jurisdiction whether such measures are consistent with the Articles of Agreement of the Fund."

Therefore, should the IMF decide that China follows the Articles, the WTO, including its dispute settlement bodies, will not be open to challenges on the issue.

=== US Accusation During the Trump Administration ===
On August 5, 2019, the U.S. Department of the Treasury designated China as a currency manipulator in a press release. The determination was made by the then-Secretary Mnuchin under the auspices of then-President Donald Trump. The press release also claimed that Mnuchin shall "engage with the International Monetary Fund to eliminate the unfair competitive advantage created by China's latest actions." On August 6, 2019, the People's Bank of China issued a statement, refuting the U.S. Treasury's designation of China as a currency manipulator, claiming that Renminbi's depreciation was the result of "shifts in market dynamics and volatilities in global foreign exchange markets amid global economic developments and escalating trade frictions."

On August 9, 2019, the IMF issued the 2019 Article IV Consultation for the PRC, in which it determined that the value of Renminbi in 2018 was "broadly in line with fundamentals and desirable policies," therefore essentially disputed the accusation raised by the U.S. during the trade conflict against China. James Daniel, the IMF's mission chief for China, also commented that Renminbi in 2018 was not significantly over-or undervalued.

On January 13, 2020, the U.S. Department of the Treasury removed China from the list of currency manipulator, on the eve of reaching a mutual trade deal.

== China and IMF SDR ==
On October 1, 2016, the Chinese Yuan officially joined the SDR basket and became a foreign exchange reserve currency of the IMF, along with U.S. Dollar, British Pound, Euro and Japanese Yen.

The IMF conducts a quarterly survey called COFER, or the Currency Composition of Official Foreign Exchange Reserves. This survey collects information on member states’ foreign exchange reserves. With the recent inclusion of the Chinese Yuan, the currency varieties in the 4th quarter of 2016 COFER report includes the U.S. Dollar, the Euro, the Japanese Yen, the British Pound, the Swiss Franc, the Australian Dollar, the Canadian Dollar, and the Chinese Yuan. For the five SDR reserved currencies, their respective global foreign exchange reserve sums were as follows:

- U.S. Dollar: US$5,052.94 billion
- Euro: US$1,559.26 billion
- Chinese Yuan: US$84.51 billion
- Japanese Yen: US$332.77 billion
- British Pound: US$349.33 billion

The currency composition of the SDR basket is reviewed every five years. The current weights for the component currencies are as follows:

- U.S. Dollar: 41.73%
- Euro: 30.93%
- Chinese Yuan: 10.92%
- Japanese Yen: 8.33%
- British Pound: 8.09%

The current value of SDR is determined by these five SDR reserved currencies and equals the sum of the following currency values:

- U.S. Dollar: 0.58252
- Euro: 0.38671
- Chinese Yuan: 1.0174
- Japanese Yen: 11.900
- British Pound: 0.085946
