= Ton of refrigeration =

American unit of refrigeration power

ton of refrigeration
- Unit of: Power
- Symbol: TR, ToR, RT

Conversions
1 TR in ...	... is equal to ...
- SI units: 3.51685 kW
- Non-SI metric: 3,025.97 kcal/h
- US Customary and Imperial: 12,000.00 Btu_{IT}/h; 2,593.90 ft⋅lbf/s

A ton of refrigeration (TR or TOR), also called a refrigeration ton (RT), is a unit of power used in some countries (especially in North America) to describe the heat-extraction rate of refrigeration and air conditioning equipment. It was originally defined as the rate of heat transfer that results in the freezing or melting of 1 short ton (2,000 lb; 907 kg) of pure ice at 0 °C (32 °F) in 24 hours.

The modern definition is exactly 12,000 Btu_{IT}/h (3.516853 kW). Air-conditioning and refrigeration equipment capacity in the U.S. is often specified in "tons" (of refrigeration). Many manufacturers also specify capacity in Btu/h, especially when specifying the performance of smaller equipment.

== History ==
The ton of refrigeration is equivalent to the consumption of one short ton of ice per day and originated during the transition from stored natural ice to mechanical refrigeration. Just as horsepower and candlepower were intuitive units of measure for people living through the transition from horse to steam power and from flame-based to electric lighting, so was the ton of refrigeration an intuitive unit of measure during a technological change, as the ice trade gradually included growing percentages of artificial ice (ice from ice-making plant) in addition to its natural ice supplies. The TR unit was developed during the 1880s. Its definition was set at the level of an industry standard in 1903, when Thomas Shipley of the York Manufacturing Company led the formation of an industry association (the Ice Machine Builders Association of the United States) along with standardization of several equipment specifications. In 1904 these efforts led to the founding of the American Society of Refrigerating Engineers (ASRE), which was one of the predecessors of ASHRAE.

== See also ==
- Heating, ventilation, and air conditioning
- Joule
- Ton

== Bibliography ==
- Rodengen, Jeffrey L (1997), The Legend of York International, Write Stuff Syndicate Inc, ISBN 9780945903178, LCCN 95062225, OCLC 37507402.
