= British thermal unit =

Unit of energy

- Graph of total energy consumption in the US (divided into energy sources) in quadrillion Btu

General information
- Unit system: Imperial/US units
- Unit of: Energy (heat)
- Symbol: Btu

Conversions
1 Btu in ...	... is equal to ...
- SI units: ≈ 1055 J

The British thermal unit (Btu) is a unit of measure of heat, which is a form of energy. It was originally defined as the amount of heat required to raise the temperature of one pound of water by one degree Fahrenheit. It is also part of the United States customary units. (Note: In a short note, Woledge notes that the actual technical term "British thermal unit" apparently originated in the United States, and was subsequently adopted in Great Britain.) In terms of joules (J), the SI unit for energy, one Btu equals about 1,055 J (varying within the range of 1,054–1,060 J depending on the specific definition of Btu; see below).

While units of heat are often supplanted by units of energy in scientific work, they are still used in some fields. For example, in the United States the price of natural gas is quoted in dollars per the amount of natural gas that would give 1 million Btu (1 "MMBtu") of heat energy if burned.

== Definitions ==
A Btu was originally defined as the amount of heat required to raise the temperature of one pound of liquid water by one degree Fahrenheit at a constant pressure of one atmospheric unit. There are several different definitions of the Btu that differ slightly. This reflects the fact that the temperature change of a mass of water due to the addition of a specific amount of heat (calculated in energy units, usually joules) depends slightly upon the water's initial temperature. As seen in the table below, definitions of the Btu based on different water temperatures vary by up to 0.5%.

Variant	Energy (J)	Notes
Thermochemical	≈1,054.35 (Note: 4.184 × 453.59237 × 5/9)	Originally, the thermochemical Btu was defined as the heat required to raise the temperature of one pound of water from its freezing point to its boiling point, divided by 180 (the temperature change being 180 °F). The basis for its modern definition in terms of SI units is the conceptually similar thermochemical calorie, originally defined as the heat required to raise the temperature of one gram of water from freezing to boiling divided by 100 (the temperature change being 100 °C). The thermochemical calorie is exactly 4.184 J by definition of the International Organization for Standardization (ISO). The thermochemical Btu is calculated by converting from grams to pounds and from Celsius to Fahrenheit.
59 °F (15.0 °C)	≈1,054.80	Used for American natural gas pricing.
60 °F (15.6 °C)	≈1,054.68	Mainly Canadian.
39 °F (3.9 °C)	≈1,059.67	Uses the calorie value of water at its maximum density (4 °C, 39.2 °F).
IT	≈1,055.06 (Note: 4.1868 × 453.59237 × 5/9)	An early effort to define heat units directly in terms of energy units, and hence to remove the direct association with the properties of water, was made by the International Steam Table Conferences. These conferences originally adopted the simplified definition that 860 "IT" calories corresponded to exactly 1 international watt-hour (not the same as a modern watt-hour). This definition ultimately became the statement that 1 IT calorie is exactly 4.1868 J. The Btu is then calculated from the calorie as is done for the thermochemical definitions of the Btu and the calorie, as in International standard ISO 31-4 Quantities and units—Part 4: Heat and British Standard BS 350:Part 1:1974 Conversion factors and tables.

=== Prefixes ===
Units of kBtu are used in building energy use tracking and heating system sizing. Energy Use Index (EUI) represents kBtu per square foot of conditioned floor area. "k" stands for 1,000.

The unit MBtu is used in natural gas and other industries to indicate 1,000 Btu, and MMBtu to indicate 1,000,000 Btu This use of M differs from its use in the metric system as a symbol for mega-, 1,000,000, as in MW and MWh.

The unit 'therm' is used to represent 100,000 Btu. A decatherm is 10 therms or one million Btu. The unit quad is commonly used to represent one quadrillion (10^{15}) Btu.

== Conversions ==
One Btu is approximately:

- 1.0551 kJ (kilojoules)
- 0.2931 W⋅h (watt hours)
- 252.2 cal (calories)
- 0.2522 kcal (kilocalories)
- 25,031 to 25,160 ft⋅pdl (foot-poundal)
- 778.2 ft⋅lbf (foot-pounds-force)
- 5.40395 (lbf/in^{2})⋅ft^{3}

A Btu can be approximated as the heat produced by burning a single wooden kitchen match or as the amount of energy it takes to lift a one-pound (0.45 kg) weight 778 feet (237 m).

=== Btu conversion factors ===
For purposes of site energy, the following conversion factors apply:

- Electricity: 3,412 Btu/kilowatthour
- Natural gas: 1,031 Btu/cubic foot
- Fuel oil No. 1: 135,000 Btu/gallon
- Kerosene: 135,000 Btu/gallon
- Fuel oil No. 2: 138,690 Btu/gallon
- LPG (propane): 91,330 Btu/gallon
- Wood: 20 million Btu/cord

=== For natural gas ===
- In natural gas pricing, the Canadian definition is that 1,000,000 Btu ≡ 1.054615 GJ.
- The energy content (high or low heating value) of a volume of natural gas varies with the composition of the natural gas, which means there is no universal conversion factor for energy to volume. 1 cubic foot (28 litres) of average natural gas yields ≈ 1,030 Btu (between 1,010 Btu and 1,070 Btu, depending on quality, when burned)
- As a coarse approximation, 1,000 cubic feet (28 m^{3}) of natural gas yields ≈ 1,000,000 Btu ≈ 1 GJ.
- For natural gas price conversion 1,000 m^{3} ≈ 36.9 million Btu and 1,000,000 Btu ≈ 27.1 m^{3}

== Associated units ==
- 1 ton of cooling, a common unit in North American refrigeration and air conditioning applications, is 12,000 Btu/h (3.52 kW). It is the rate of heat transfer needed to freeze 1 short ton (907 kg) of water into ice in 24 hours.
- In the United States and Canada, the R-value that describes the performance of thermal insulation is typically quoted in square foot degree Fahrenheit hours per British thermal unit (ft^{2}⋅°F⋅h/Btu). For one square foot of the insulation, one Btu per hour of heat flows across the insulator for each degree of temperature difference across it.
- 1 therm is defined in the United States as 100,000 Btu using the Btu_{59 °F} definition. In the EU it was listed in 1979 with the BTU_{IT} definition and planned to be discarded as a legal unit of trade by 1994. United Kingdom regulations were amended to replace therms with joules with effect from 1 January 2000. As of 2013 the therm was still used in natural gas pricing in the United Kingdom.
- 1 quad (short for quadrillion Btu) is 10^{15} Btu, which is about 1 exajoule (1.055×10^{18} J). Quads are used in the United States for representing the annual energy consumption of large economies: for example, the U.S. economy used 99.75 quads in 2005. One quad/year is about 33.43 gigawatts.

The Btu should not be confused with the Board of Trade Unit (BTU), an obsolete UK synonym for kilowatt hour (1 kW⋅h or 3,412 Btu).

The Btu is often used to express the conversion-efficiency of heat into electrical energy in power plants. Figures are quoted in terms of the quantity of heat in Btu required to generate 1 kW⋅h of electrical energy. A typical coal-fired power plant works at 10,500 Btu/kWh (3.1 kWh/kWh), an efficiency of 32–33%.

The centigrade heat unit (CHU) is the amount of heat required to raise the temperature of one pound (0.45 kg) of water by one Celsius degree. It is equal to 1.8 Btu or 1,899 joules. In 1974, this unit was "still sometimes used" in the United Kingdom as an alternative to Btu.

Another legacy unit for energy in the metric system is the calorie, which is defined as the amount of heat required to raise the temperature of one gram of water by one degree Celsius.

=== Btu/h ===
The SI unit of power for heating and cooling systems is the watt. Btu per hour (Btu/h) is sometimes used in North America and the United Kingdom—the latter for air conditioning mainly, though "Btu/h" is sometimes abbreviated to just "Btu". MBH—thousands of Btu per hour—is also common.

- 1 W is approximately 3.412142 Btu/h
- 1,000 Btu/h is approximately 0.2931 kW
- 1 hp is approximately 2,544 Btu/h

== See also ==
- Conversion of units
- Latent heat
- Metrication
- Ton of refrigeration
