= Currency manipulator =

Designation applied by the US government to countries

Currency manipulator is a designation applied by United States government authorities, such as the United States Department of the Treasury, to countries that engage in what is called "unfair currency practices" that give them a trade advantage. Such practices may be currency intervention or monetary policy in which a central bank buys or sells foreign currency in exchange for domestic currency, generally with the intention of influencing the exchange rate and commercial policy. Policymakers may have different reasons for currency intervention, such as controlling inflation, maintaining international competitiveness, or financial stability. In many cases, the central bank weakens its own currency to subsidize exports and raise the price of imports, sometimes by as much as 30–40%, and it is thereby a method of protectionism.

Under the 1988 Omnibus Foreign Trade and Competitiveness Act, the United States Secretary of the Treasury is required to "analyze on an annual basis the exchange rate policies of foreign countries … and consider whether countries manipulate the exchange rate between their currency and the United States dollar for purposes of preventing effective balance of payments adjustments or gaining unfair competitive advantage in international trade" and that "If the Secretary considers that such manipulation is occurring with respect to countries that (1) have material global current account surpluses; and (2) have significant bilateral trade surpluses with the United States, the Secretary of the Treasury shall take action to initiate negotiations with such foreign countries on an expedited basis, in the International Monetary Fund or bilaterally, for the purpose of ensuring that such countries regularly and promptly adjust the rate of exchange between their currencies and the United States dollar to permit effective balance of payments".

A designated currency manipulator can be excluded from U.S. government procurement contracts.

According to the Trade Facilitation and Trade Enforcement Act of 2015, the Secretary of the Treasury must publish a semi-annual report in which the developments in international economic and exchange rate policies are reviewed. If a country is labeled a currency manipulator under this Act, "The President, through Treasury, shall take specified remedial action against any such countries that fail to adopt policies to correct the undervaluation of their currency and trade surplus with the United States."

It has been argued that the concept of "currency manipulation" is hypocritical, given that the US already has the privilege of having the main reserve currency of the world, which is needed for international trade. Massive interventions of the Federal Reserve since the 2008 financial crisis, such as Quantitative Easing and interventions in the REPO market have been cited as alleged examples of the U.S. itself engaging in currency manipulation.

== Designations under the 1988 Act ==
Since the 1988 Act was enacted, the United States Department of the Treasury has designated the following countries as currency manipulators:

- South Korea in 1988.
- Taiwan in 1988 and again in 1992.
- China from 1992 to 1994.
- India was added to the list in 2017 for 'questionable foreign exchange policies'. It had stated that India had increased its purchases of foreign exchange over the last three quarters of 2017, although the rupee still rose in value. India's net purchases of foreign exchange in 2017 as a whole totaled $56 billion (2.2% of GDP).

In May 2019, the US Treasury removed India and Switzerland from its currency monitoring list but China, Japan, South Korea, Germany, Italy, Ireland, Singapore, Malaysia, and Vietnam remained on the list. India was removed from the list after it met one of the three criteria necessary for inclusion on the monitoring list, namely, a significant bilateral surplus with the US. India also reduced its level of foreign exchange reserves, to 0.2% of GDP. An analysis by The Economist in 2017 noted that Switzerland has been manipulating its currency more than China since 2009 and Taiwan and South Korea have been doing so since 2014.

- In August 2019, the Trump administration, as part of the China–United States trade war, again designated China a currency manipulator, a designation not supported by the International Monetary Fund. The designation against China was withdrawn in January 2020 after China agreed to refrain from devaluing its currency to make its own goods cheaper for foreign buyers. The two countries are soon to sign a "Phase 1 U.S.-China trade agreement" that includes a provision that prevents China from manipulating its currency to gain trade advantages.
- In December 2020, the Trump administration designated Switzerland and Vietnam as currency manipulators. In April 2021, the Biden administration redesignated Vietnam and Switzerland; they were removed from the currency manipulator list and moved to enhanced monitoring list.

In December 2020, India, Thailand, and Taiwan were added to the monitoring list. China, Japan, South Korea, Germany, Italy, Singapore and Malaysia continued to be on the list.

== Evaluation criteria ==
Evaluation criteria, June 2024
Country	FX Intervention	Current Account	Bilateral Trade	Monitoring list
Country	Net Purchases (% of GDP) ≧ 2%	Balance (% of GDP) ≧ 2%	Goods Surplus (billion USD) ≧ 20 billion USD	Monitoring list
Singapore	7.1	19.8	−28	Yes
Vietnam	1.5	5.8	103	Yes
China	−0.1 — 0.5	1.4	254	Yes
Mexico	0.4	−0.3	153	Yes
Germany	-	6.1	86	Yes
Japan	-	3.6	62	Yes
Taiwan	-0.4	13.9	48	Yes
Malaysia	-2.3	1.3	25	Yes

Evaluation criteria, April 2021
Country	FX Intervention	Current Account	Bilateral Trade	Enhanced engagement	Monitoring list
Country	Net Purchases (% of GDP) ≧ 2%	Balance (% of GDP) ≧ 2%	Goods Surplus (billion USD) ≧ 20 billion USD	Enhanced engagement	Monitoring list
Singapore	28.3	17.6	4		Yes
Switzerland	15.3	3.7	57	Yes	
Taiwan	5.8	14.1	30	Yes	
Vietnam	4.4	3.7	70	Yes	
Thailand	1.9	3.2	26		Yes
China	−0.1 — 1.2	1.9	311		Yes
Malaysia	0.6	4.4	32		Yes
South Korea	0.3	4.6	25		Yes
Japan	0.0	3.3	55		Yes
Mexico	−0.2	2.4	113		Yes
Germany	-	6.9	57		Yes
Ireland	-	4.8	56		Yes
Italy	-	3.7	30		Yes

Evaluation criteria, December 2020
Country	Bilateral Trade	Current Account	FX Intervention	Currency manipulator	Monitoring List.
Country	Goods Surplus (billion USD) ≧ 20 billion USD	Balance (% of GDP) ≧ 2%	Net Purchases (% of GDP) ≧ 2%	Currency manipulator	Monitoring List.
China	310	1.1	−0.1		Yes
Germany	62	6.8	–		Yes
Vietnam	58	4.6	5.1	Yes	
Japan	57	3.1	0		Yes
Switzerland	49	8.8	14.2	Yes	
Italy	30	3.0	–		Yes
Malaysia	29	2.5	1.1		Yes
Taiwan	25	10.9	1.7		Yes
Thailand	22	6.3	1.8		Yes
India	22	0.4	2.4		Yes
South Korea	20	3.5	−0.6		Yes
Singapore	−1	16.1	21.3		Yes

== Impact on manufacturing ==
Currency manipulation has a disproportionate effect on the secondary sector of the economy and lobbyists of the U.S. manufacturing sector have regularly referred to China as a currency manipulator. A 2013 analysis by Carlos D. Ramirez found that "an increase of one percentage point in the share of congressional district labor force in manufacturing is associated with a 19.6% increase in the likelihood that the district legislator will label Mainland China a currency manipulator".

== Reactions ==
In 2020, the COVID-19 pandemic has exacerbated U.S. trade deficits with a number of nations, including Switzerland and Vietnam. While the Swiss National Bank continued to practice currency interventions to stop the influx of foreign money during economic crisis, the State Bank of Vietnam as well said that its foreign exchange rate policy "is a way to contain inflation, ensure macro stability and not to create an unfair trade advantage". A senior U.S. treasury official said the US aimed "to resolve our issues" with Vietnam and Switzerland within a year. He added that the Biden administration had not been briefed on the issue, and that "they are not implicated in this."

After the Biden administration moved Switzerland, Vietnam and Taiwan to an enhanced engagement status in April 2021, US treasury officials confirmed that the COVID-19 pandemic has caused massive trade and capital flow distortions, increasing the necessity for currency interventions in those export-oriented countries. Taiwanese and Vietnamese officials welcomed the move not to categorize them as currency manipulators, since US authorities understood their "special situation". Both the State Bank of Vietnam and the Swiss National Bank would continue to practice currency interventions to contain inflation, and ensure macro-economic stability.

== See also ==
- Protectionism
