= Globalization in China =

Globalization in China discusses the history of globalization in China; including the economic, social, cultural influences that have been integrated into Chinese society.

== Early dynasties and the Silk Road ==
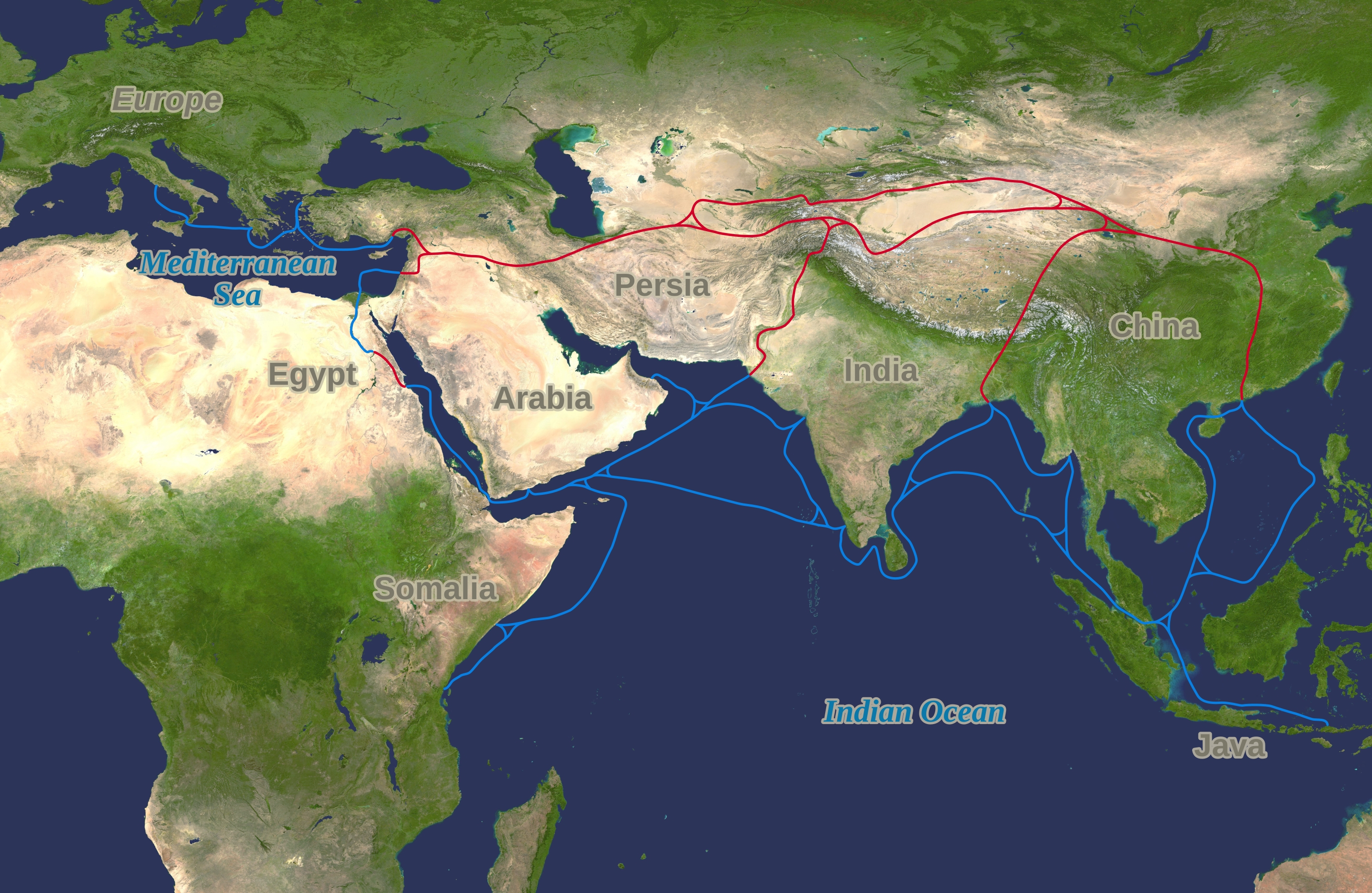
The Silk Road extending from southern Europe through Arabia, Somalia, Egypt, Persia, India and Java until it reaches China

The first historical instance of China engaging in internationalism was during the Han dynasty. At the start of the Han dynasty, the Huns in the north were attacking the frontiers of Han and trying to obtain riches. Emperor Wu of Han wanted to gain an alliance with a country called Darouzhi so the two countries could join and fight against the Huns. To obtain this alliance, King Wu sent Zhang Qian to the West to establish economic and cultural connections. History records that during the Han dynasty there were four primary avenues of contact between China and Europe. They included the northern land route, the central land route, the southern sea route, and the far southern sea route. The most famous of these routes is the central land route, or the classical Silk Road, comprising a network of roads stretching from northwest China to the ports of Syria and the Black Sea, which passed through the oasis of the Turkestans and Northern Persia. The Silk Road was significant for Chinese emperors because it provided dominance over Central Asia by developing resources and provided new markets for the export of China's most valuable resources.

During the Tang dynasty there was a new age of urbanization and increased maritime commerce. For instance, Changan, the capital of the dynasty, developed into one of the largest cities during that time. By 742 CE, the population had reached almost 2 million and census showed that 5,000 foreigners lived in the city: Turks, Iranians, Indians, and others from along the road. Trade continued to flourish during this period and brought an increased number of foreigners, foreign religions, and foreign ideas in China.

The Song dynasty transformed the focus of the Silk Road from the reliance on domestic trade to a reliance on Pacific Orientation. Trade was now supported by a large merchant marine and defended by an imperial navy and long-distance routes to the Middle East, India and the coast of Africa were now more readily available. During this period, the government started to heavily regulate foreign trade due to military threats on the Northern border. In order to monitor the flow of commodities in international trade, the Bureau of Merchant Shipping was established to tax merchant ships passing through. In addition, international trade became less focused on cultural exchanges and instead was seen as a necessity for the growth of the Chinese economy.

== Modern China ==
=== 20th-century China ===
China's efforts to balance the economic and socio-political tasks of education in its modern nation-building can be traced back to the struggles of the late Qing dynasty, under threat of foreign aggression for modernization and national survival. This dilemma has persisted through the establishment of the Republic of China (1912–1949) and the People's Republic of China, and onto that of the successors and into modern day.

Older societies have had to overhaul their institutions and world views radically in order to conform with the models of the modern nation state system, with post-1949 China being the time that this reordering took place within China. After the Tiananmen Square protests of 1989, the Chinese government instituted a number of reforms that were meant to increase economic growth while at the same time stifling the proliferation of democratic sentiments in their country. To the CCP (or the CPC), Democracy leads to political instability which in turn impedes economic development and this is a sentiment believed by many people inside China.

In 1989 China's population was the largest in the world but its GDP was only ninth in the world, yet twenty-five years later China's economy has become the second largest after only the U.S. This major increase in economic development was not without a cost because although economic reform and globalization had brought China unprecedented wealth it also brought China a monstrous increase in carbon dioxide emissions.

=== 21st-century China ===
Since 2005, China has spent more than $56 billion in sub-Saharan Africa, with significant investment in oil, platinum, copper, nickel, and manganese as well as other extracting industries. China's bilateral trade with African countries rose from $10 billion in 2000 to $125 billion in 2010 and stands to reach $300 billion by 2015, surpassing the United States as Africa's largest trading partner. China's trade with Latin America has also increased dramatically, rising to 1,500% between 2000 and 2010 through loans and direct foreign investment. China is one of the primary winners of the international sanctions against Iran, as it has allowed them to become its top trading partner, purchasing 400,000 barrels of oil per day all paid for with the yuan in an attempt to elevate the global standing of the yuan against the U.S. dollar.

Chinese integration into the global financial system has taken its first steps by way of the launch of the "Shanghai-Hong Kong Stock Connect" and "Shenzhen-Hong Kong Stock Connect". The implications that an increase in Chinese integration into the global financial system are many, with positives and negatives for both the Chinese and the Western world.

In Hong Kong there have been a number of political battles due to a feeling that with the increase of globalization came an increase of "Chinaization". Expanding global commerce and the corporate control of the political process weakens the autonomy and power of local communities, which is what Jihad vs. McWorld argues. The more integrated communities become with mainland China, the more prosperity they receive, but most of the advantages go to the various business tycoons and corporate elites, which can be seen as an example of the rise in income inequality in China.

== Economic shifts ==
Since 1980, China has undergone a series of reform policies aimed at transforming its economic system from a planned economy to a market-oriented economy by combining the planning economic systems from socialism with a market mechanism from capitalism. Along with this shift came the creation of four Special Economic Zones, areas of the country that are affected by favorable business laws aimed at increasing trade, investment, and job creation. This was spearheaded by Deng Xiaoping who set out to create a more economically open China, with the results of this new liberalization and globalization of the economy being substantial. During the period of 1978 to 2012, China's GDP grew about 9.8% annually and its GDP volume increased 22.5 times during this period, while its GDP per capita grew at an annual rate of 8.5% and increased 15 times in the same period. By 2010, China surpassed Japan to become the world's second-largest economy and at the same time it also surpassed Germany in terms of export volume, becoming the largest in the world. The massive increase of GDP in China has led to an increase of living standards for the Chinese since their incomes have doubled or even quadrupled every 10 years. Amid this economic outburst, the income distribution in China has increased dramatically, changing China from a relatively equal socialist country to a very unequal country.

The economic globalization of China has transformed the nature of its national policy preferences, calling into question for the rest of the world what their true intentions might very well be. The efforts to increase the liberalization of the Chinese economy, spearheaded by the U.S., were met with mixed feelings due to China's rapid economic progress. The bittersweet nature of China's rise in economic power leads to questions about whether or not it will support the existing international order of things or challenge it.

The undervalued Chinese yuan with respect to the United States dollar has brought about questions to whether or not a move to a more flexible exchange rate would be beneficial to the Chinese economy, with most experts arguing that no dramatic change in exchange rate is needed and that the most needed policy attention is the domestic financial sector, not the international.

== Cultural shifts ==
The Chinese desire for globalization is countered by the fear of losing their own culture, identity, and history, meaning that the suspicions towards the English language seeping into Chinese (and worldwide) cultures might be justified, if even to a small degree. English has been seen as a new form of opium to some which indicates a growing hostility towards English in China but at the same time raises questions due to English being the predominant language for international trade and communication.

China faces an unprecedented multitude of problems with regard to language choice and linguistic identity, some of which are due to challenges imposed by global English from the outside world. Although English was denounced as a language for the Bourgeoisie and imperialist during the Cultural Revolution, it is viewed as a necessary tool in China's modernization and integration with the world.

In the 1990s municipal planners in a major Port of China, Dalian, sought to make the city a regional hub for trade, finance, and tourism, attempting to make the city a "Hong Kong of the North".

== See also ==
- Globalization and women in China
- Reform and opening up
- Economy of China
