= Quad (unit) =

Unit of energy

quad
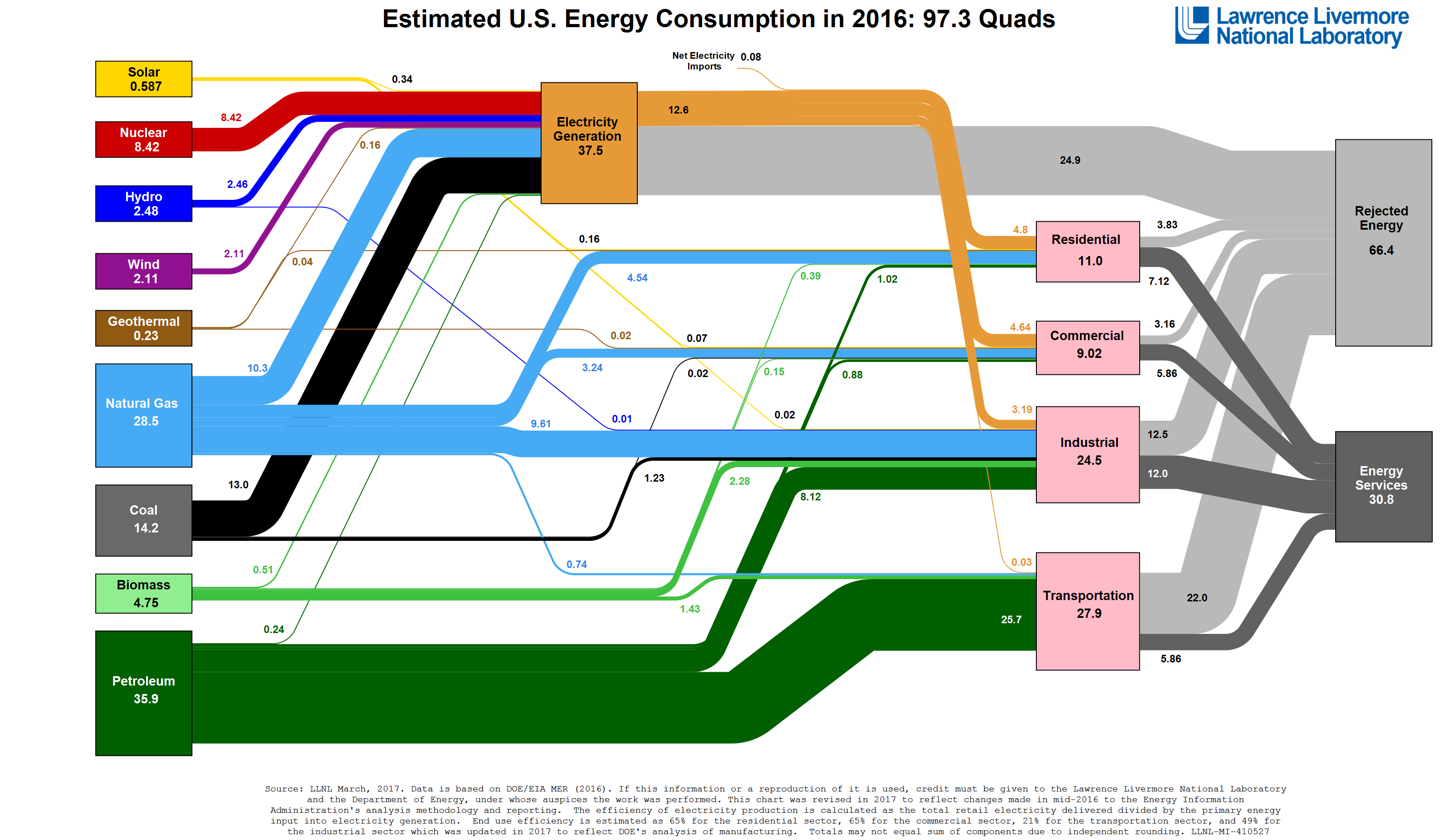
- A Sankey diagram using quads.

General information
- Unit of: energy
- Symbol: quad

Conversions
1 quad in ...	... is equal to ...
- US customary units: 10^{15} BTU
- SI: 1.055×10^{18} joule

A quad is a unit of energy equal to 10^{15} (a short-scale quadrillion) BTU, or 1.055×10^{18} joule (1.055 exajoules or EJ) in SI units.

The unit is used by the U.S. Department of Energy in discussing world and national energy budgets. The global primary energy production in 2022 was 637.8 quad, i.e., 672.9 EJ.

== Conversion ==
Some common types of an energy carrier approximately equal to 1 quad are:

- 8,007,000,000 gallons (US) of gasoline
- 293,071,000,000 kWh
- 293.07 terawatt-hours (TWh)
- 33.434 gigawatt-years (GWy)
- 36,000,000 tonnes of coal
- 970,434,000,000 cubic feet of natural gas
- 5,996,000,000 UK gallons of diesel oil
- 25,200,000 tonnes of oil
- 252,000,000 tonnes of TNT or five times the energy of the Tsar Bomba nuclear test
- 12.69 tonnes of uranium-235 (with 83.14 TJ/kg)
- 6 seconds of sunlight reaching Earth

== See also ==
- Units of energy
- Orders of magnitude (energy)
